= Astronomical Calculation Institute =

Research institute in Heidelberg, Germany

Coordinates: 49°25′4.3″N 8°41′16.7″E

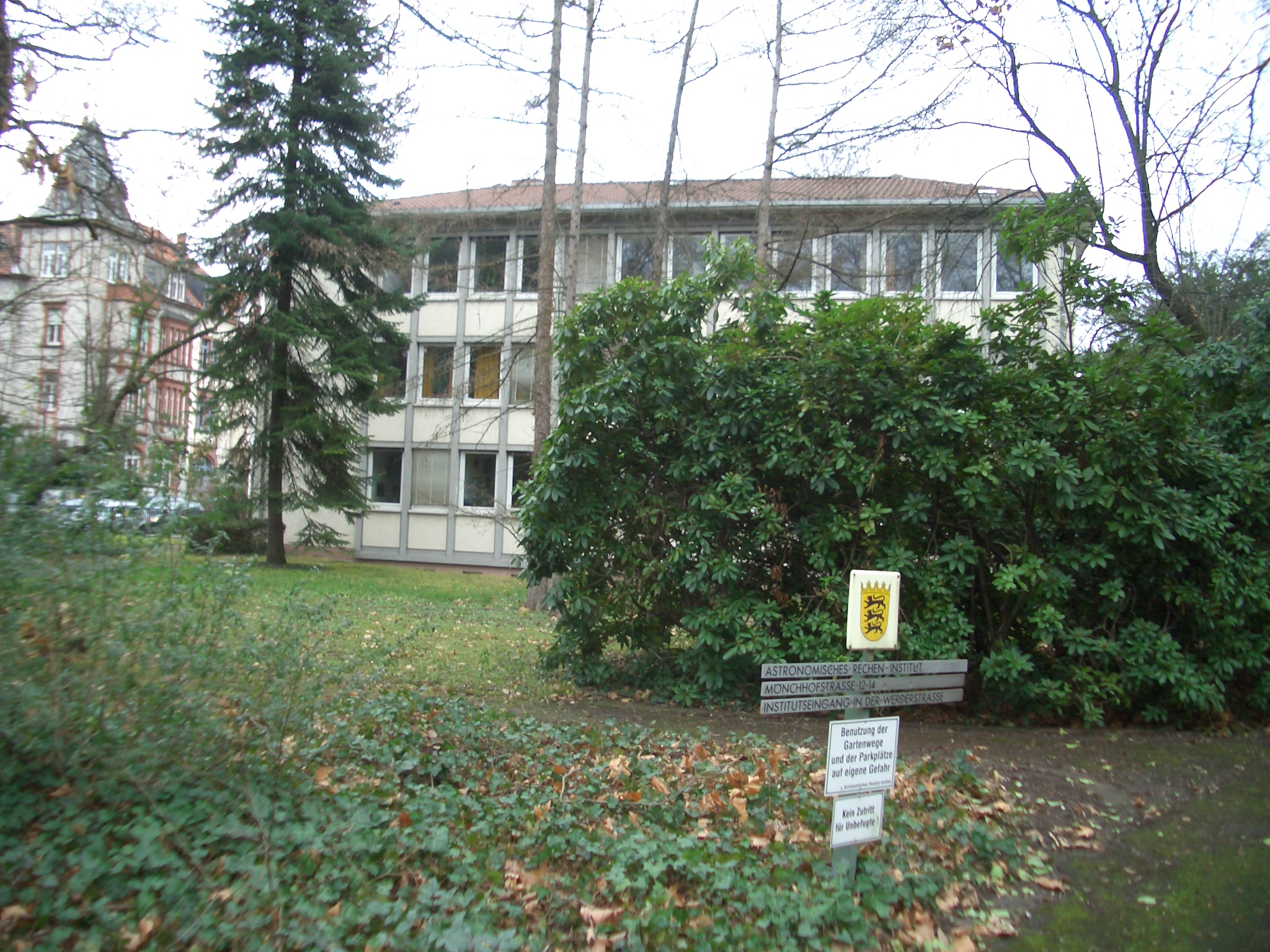
The Astronomisches Rechen-Institut

The Astronomical Calculation Institute (German: Astronomisches Rechen-Institut; ARI) is a research institute in Heidelberg, Germany, with origins dating back from the 1700s. Beginning in 2005, the ARI became part of the Center for Astronomy at Heidelberg University (Zentrum für Astronomie der Universität Heidelberg, ZAH). Previously, the institute directly belonged to the state of Baden-Württemberg.

== Description ==
The ARI has a rich history. It was founded in 1700 in Berlin-Dahlem by Gottfried Kirch. It had its origin in a patent application by Frederick I of Prussia, who introduced a monopoly on publishing star catalogs in Prussia. In 1945 the Institute was moved by the Americans nearer to the United States Army Garrison Heidelberg. On January 1, 2005 the combined Center for Astronomy institute formed by combining ARI, with the Institute of Theoretical Astrophysics (Institut für Theoretische Astrophysik, ITA) and the Landessternwarte Heidelberg-Königstuhl ("Heidelberg-Königstuhl State Observatory", LSW).

The ARI has been responsible among other things for the Gliese catalog of nearby stars, the fundamental catalogs FK5 and FK6, and the annually-published "Apparent Places of Fundamental Stars" (APFS), stellar ephemerides that provide high-precision mean and apparent positions of over three thousand stars for each day.

During 1938–1945, whilst based in Berlin, ARI published the academic journal Astronomical Notes (German: Astronomische Nachrichten). As of 2016, ARI was not limited to only publishing star catalogs, but has a wider research scope, including gravitational lensing, galaxy evolution, stellar dynamics, and cosmology. ARI is also involved in space astronomy missions including the Gaia mission.

In 2007 professors Eva K. Grebel and Joachim Wambsganß became co-directors of the institute.

Other researchers involved with the institute include Hartmut Jahreiß author of the updated Gliese Catalogue of Nearby Stars; Eugene Rabe; Lutz D. Schmadel, author of the Dictionary of Minor Planet Names; Hans Scholl; and Rainer Spurzem working with N-body simulations.

== Directors ==
Between 1700 and 2007 there was a single director of the institute at a time. From 2007 onwards there were joint co-directors of the institute:

From/to	Director
1700–1710	Gottfried Kirch
1710–1716	Johann Heinrich Hoffmann
1716–1740	Christfried Kirch
1740–1745	Johann Wilhelm Wagner
1745–1749	August Nathanael Grischow
1752–1752	Joseph Jerome Le Francais de Lalande
1754–1755	Johann Kies
1755–1755	Franz Ulrich Theodosius Aepinus
1756–1756	Johann Jakob Huber
1758–1758	Johann Albert Euler
1764–1787	Johann III Bernoulli
1787–1825	Johann Elert Bode
1825–1863	Johann Franz Encke
1865–1874	Wilhelm Foerster
1874–1895	Friedrich Tietjen
1896–1909	Julius Bauschinger
1909–1922	Fritz Cohn
1924–1954	August Kopff
1955–1985	Walter Fricke
1985–2004	Roland Wielen
2004–2007	Joachim Wambsganß
2007–pres.	Eva Grebel / Joachim Wambsganß

== See also ==
- Gottfried Kirch
- Center of Astronomy of the University of Heidelberg
- Astronomische Gesellschaft
