= Berlin Observatory =

Coordinates: 52°30′14″N 13°23′39″E

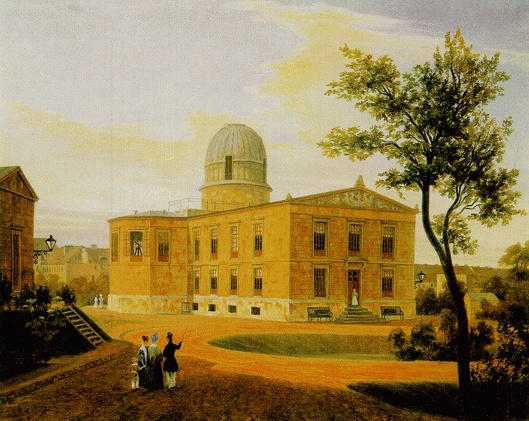
1838 painting of the New Berlin Observatory (Linden Street), where the planet Neptune was discovered in 1846

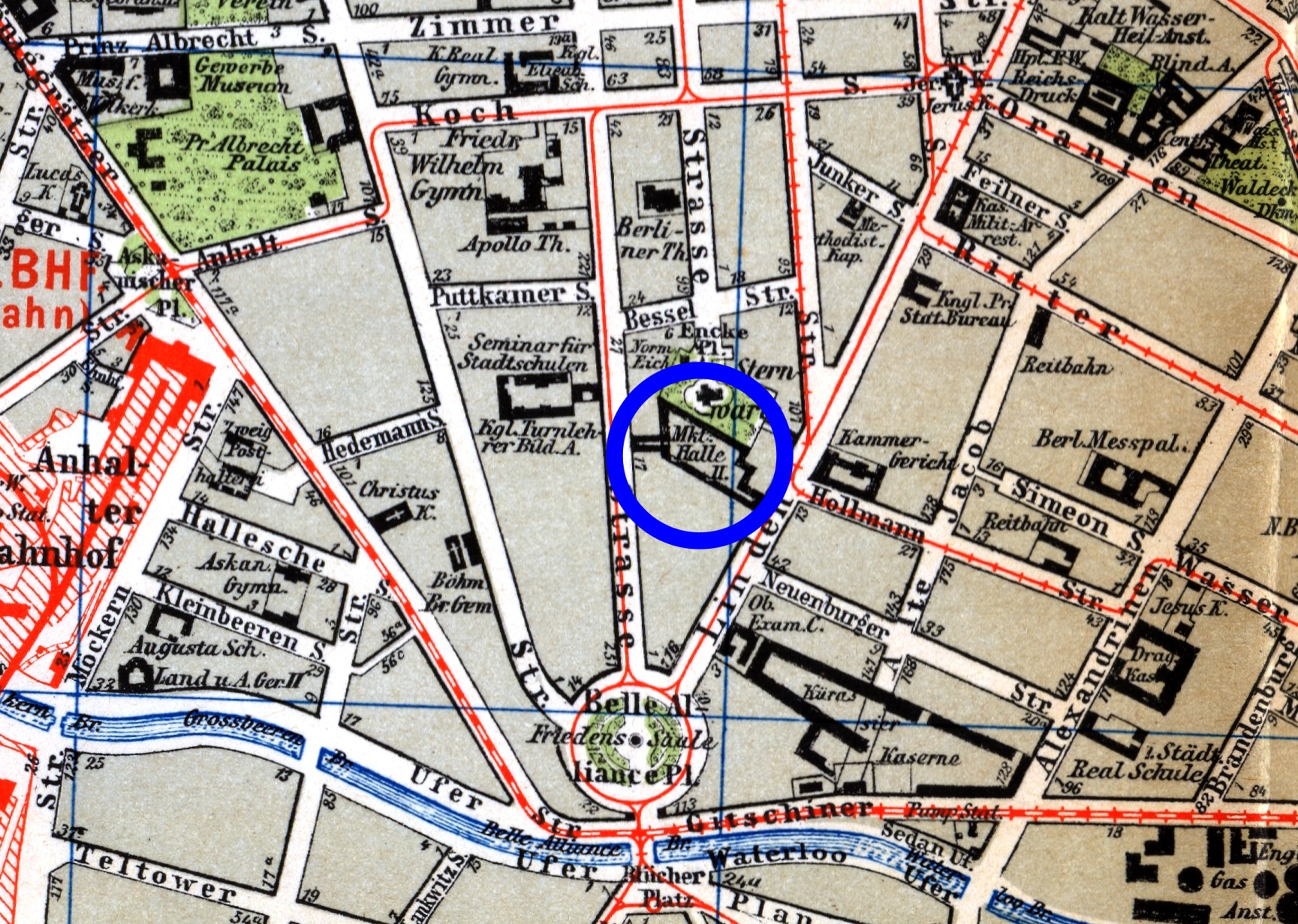
Location of the Neue Berliner Sternwarte, Berlin Observatory from 1835 to 1913

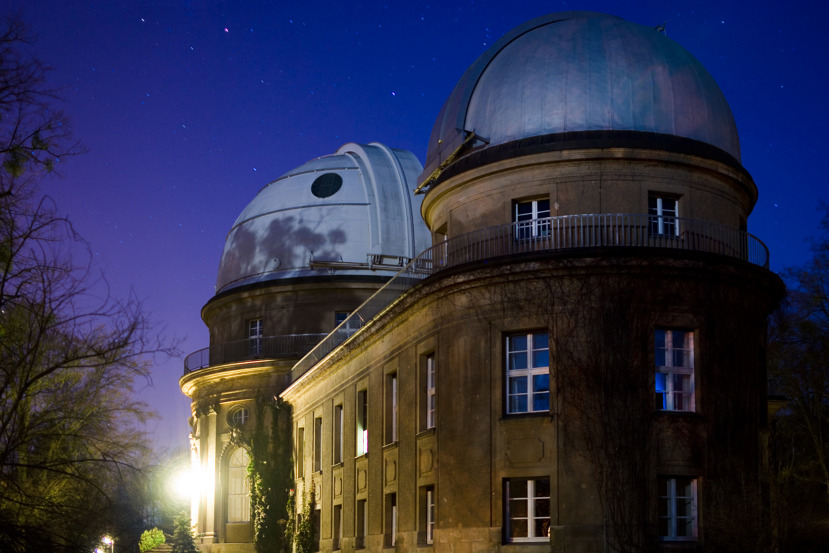
By 1913, activities were moved to a new Observatory at Babelsberg, shown here in 2006

The Berlin Observatory (German: Berliner Sternwarte) is a German astronomical institution with a series of observatories and related organizations in and around the city of Berlin in Germany, starting from the 18th century. It has its origins in 1700 when Gottfried Leibniz initiated the "Brandenburg Society of Science″ (Sozietät der Wissenschaften) which would later (1744) become the Prussian Academy of Sciences (Preußische Akademie der Wissenschaften). The Society had no observatory but nevertheless an astronomer, Gottfried Kirch, who observed from a private observatory in Berlin. A first small observatory was furnished in 1711, financing itself by calendrical computations.

In 1825, Johann Franz Encke was appointed director by King Frederick William III of Prussia. With the support of Alexander von Humboldt, Encke got the King to agree to the financing of a true observatory, but one condition was that the observatory be made accessible to the public two nights per week. The building was designed by the well-known architect Karl Friedrich Schinkel and began operating in 1835. It now bears the IAU observatory code 548.

Although the original observatory was built in the outskirts of the city, over the course of time the city expanded such that after two centuries the observatory was in the middle of other settlements, which made making observations very difficult, and a proposal to move the observatory was made. The observatory was moved to Potsdam-Babelsberg in 1913 (IAU observatory code 536). Since 1992 it is managed by the Leibniz Institute for Astrophysics Potsdam (AIP), although it has not been used for German astronomical observations since the 20th century.

In Berlin remain the Wilhelm Foerster Observatory (IAU code 544), the Archenhold Observatory (Archenhold Sternwarte), Berlin-Treptow (Archenhold Observatory; IAU code 604), the Urania Observatory (Urania Sternwarte, IAU code 537), and the Bruno H. Bürgel Observatory.

== History ==
In September 1699, the Reichstag decided to introduce an "improved calendar" to the Protestant German states without having to take on the Gregorian Calendar, introduced by Pope Gregory XIII in 1582. The "improved calendar" was introduced the following year and resulted in 18 February 1700 being followed by 1 March. A patent for the calendar was granted to the planned Berlin Observatory by Prince-elector Frederick III on 10 May 1700, and eight days later Gottfried Kirch was appointed to Director of the Observatory. On 11 July (his 43rd birthday) the Kurfürst signed a document formally founding an Academy and an Observatory in Berlin. Therefore, Berlin received an academy just like those already existing in London, Paris and Rome – the Prussian Academy of Sciences (originally German name: Kurfürstlich-Brandenburgische Societät der Wissenschaften), based on the plans of Gottfried Wilhelm Leibniz. Leibniz became the first president of the Academy. The fees resulting from the calendar patent were the almost single financial basis of the institution for a long period. The society originally had no actual observatory of its own, and Kirch carried out his observations at various private observatories, including, from 1705, the private observatory of Geheimrat Bernhard Friedrich von Krosigk on the Wallstrasse, in Cölln. Kirch was assisted by his wife Maria Margarethe and his son Christfried. Maria Margarethe discovered, among other things, the comet of 1702. In the meantime the Kurfürst had been raised in 1701 to the rank of King in Prussia. On 1 January 1710, the capital was expanded by uniting the previously independent towns of Dorotheenstadt, Friedrichstadt, Friedrichwerder, and Cölln and Berlin (the oldest ones).

=== The Old Berlin Observatory ===
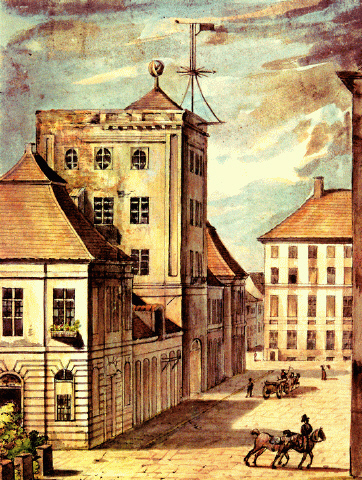
The royal stables and the observatory, watercolor painting by Leopold Ludwig Müller, 1824

The first Berlin Observatory was sited in the Dorotheenstadt quarter. The Marstall Unter den Linden had been erected from 1687 to 1688 according to the plans of the architect Johann Arnold Nering, originally for 200 horses, and a second storey was added from 1695 to 1697 for the Academie der Mahler-, Bildhauer- und Architectur-Kunst, founded in 1696. From 1696 to 1700, Martin Grünberg extended the complex northwards for the new Societät der Wissenschaften, doubling the perimeter out to the Letzten Straße (later: Dorotheenstraße)). From 1700 until 1711, the observatory, a tower built by Grünberg with three levels, was added to the northern wing of the installation. The 27-meter-high building was one of the first tower observatories of the 18th century. The observatory became partly usable in 1706 and by 1709 was more or less completed. On 15 January 1711 the Königlich Preußische Sozietät der Wissenschaften held its first meeting in the tower and four days later its first formal gathering, at which the observatory was officially handed over. It became an important focus of the Society. In time, its library and natural history collection also came to be housed under the same roof. The Society was reorganized by Frederick II in 1744 as the "Royal Academy of Sciences" (Königlichen Akademie der Wissenschaften) and retained its base there until 1752.

Gottfried Kirch died in 1710, a year before the official opening of the Academy and the Observatory. His assistant Johann Heinrich Hoffmann moved up to replace him as the head of the observatory. After his death in 1716 Christfried Kirch, the son of Gottfried Kirch, became his successor. He was aided in his work on the calendar by his mother Maria Margarethe Kirch and his sister, just like he and his mother once helped his father. His mother died in 1720. From 1720 until 1736 he was assisted with the practical activities by J. G. Schütz. After the death of Christfried Kirch he took on the post of director in 1740. For many years the calculations for the calendar were continued the most part by Christine Kirch; she was also responsible for the keeping of the accounts. During the years of "Old Observatory" questions of astronomy were also discussed and grappled with in Berlin by the likes of, among others, Leonhard Euler, Joseph Louis Lagrange and Johann Heinrich Lambert. In 1765, Giovanni Salvemini (aka Johann Castillon) received the position of First Astronomer. In 1768, the Observatory received a mural quadrant constructed by John Bird, their first really important observing instrument. This device can now be seen in Babelsberg Observatory.

Johann III Bernoulli served from 1764 to 1787 as Director of the Old Observatory and was succeeded by Johann Elert Bode. Lambert fetched Bode to Berlin in 1773, in order to publish an almanac; after Lambert' death, Bode became the sole editor. The first edition of the Berliner Astronomisches Jahrbuch (for 1776) had already appeared by 1774, initiating the longest-lasting publication series in astronomy, lasting until 1959. By virtue of this medium, Berlin Observatory developed into an information source of prime importance within Europe. Originally Bode had the venerable Christine Kirch to assist him with the work on the calendar. In 1774, he married a granddaughter of one of her sisters; she was likewise entrusted with astronomical work in line with the Kirch family tradition. Christine Kirch died in 1782. As director of the observatory, Bode was able, through favors from Frederick William III of Prussia, to extend the till then rather third-class-equipped institution with a second observing level. When Bode entered a petition to this effect on 2 November 1798, space for observing within the tower was still limited to the third storey. The two storeys over it were united to a single spacious level. From there, the observing activities could be extended, once the calculated cost of 4465 thalers and the plan was approved on 7 April 1800, and the required conversion was completed by June 1801. The construction work was supervised by Oberhofbaurat and Schlossbaumeister Bock.

In 1797, Johann Georg Soldner arrived in Berlin as Bode's co-worker and in 1801 (Astronomisches Jahrbuch für 1804) Soldner's work appeared on the weight of light with implications for the curving of light rays in a gravitational field. In 1805, Jabbo Oltmanns came to Berlin and assisted Bode with his astronomical observations and his work on the Jahrbuch, in which also the first of his own articles appeared. Oltmanns also became an assistant to Alexander von Humboldt and processed the positional data from his just completed research expedition through Mid- and South America; during this work, Humboldt was ordered to Paris on a diplomatic mission after Napoleon's occupation of Berlin in 1806, and Oltmanns followed him in 1808. Until 1811, the astronomical institute financed itself almost exclusively from the monopoly on the calendar calculations, which had been conferred on the Academy at the time of its founding; in that year the Academy lost its calendar privileges and became dependent on the state budget and on charity.

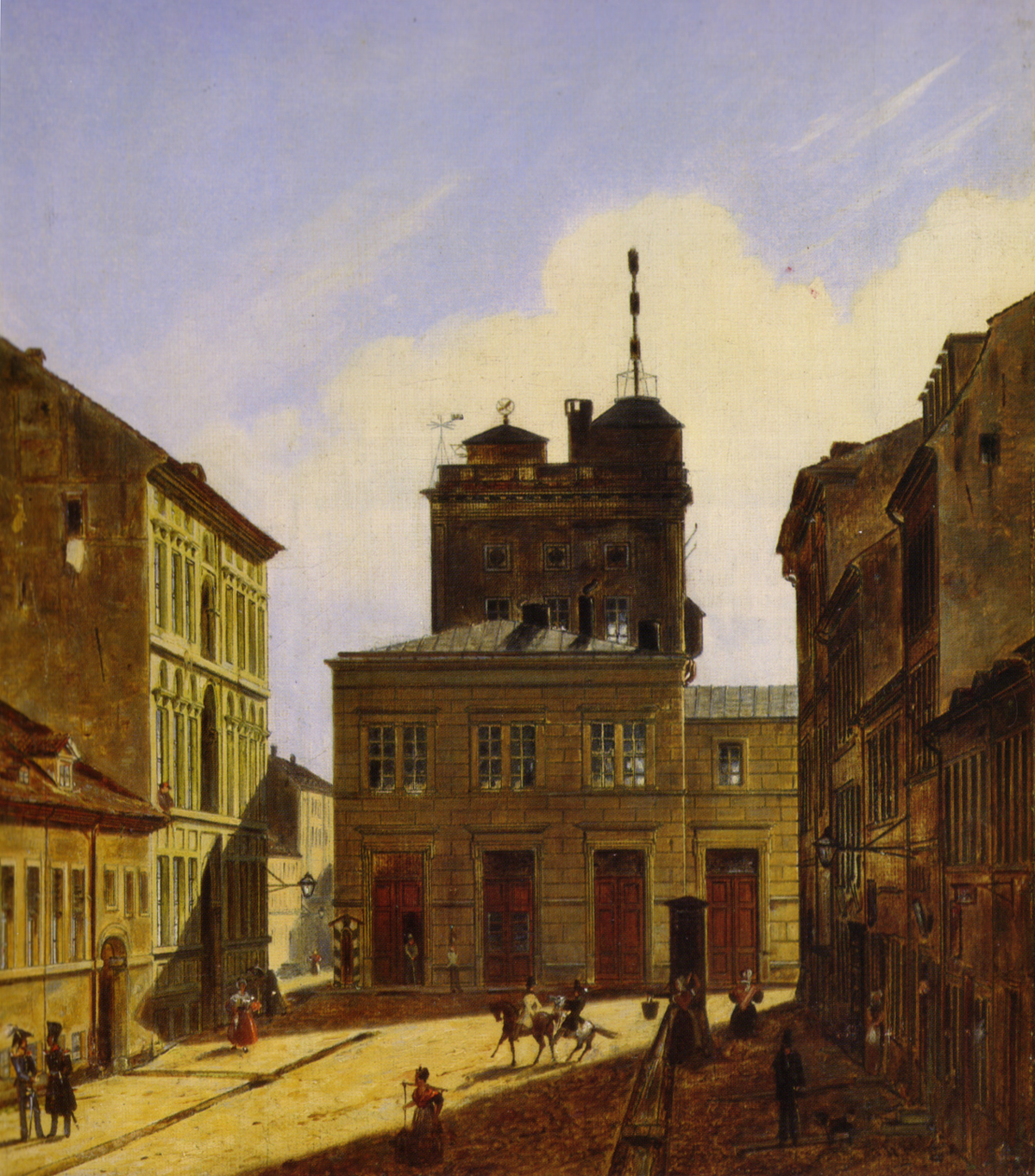
Tower of the old Berlin Observatory between 1832 and 1848, with signal mast of the optical telegraph. View from the west, by F. W. Klose

When the time came to seek a successor by virtue of Bode's retirement, both Carl Friedrich Gauß and Friedrich Wilhelm Bessel turned the post down. On the recommendation of Bessel, Johann Franz Encke, since 1822 Director of the Seeberg Observatory near Gotha, was called to Berlin by King Frederick William III in 1825 and named director of the Berlin Observatory. Thanks to the influence of Alexander von Humboldt, expensive instruments were obtained, and with his aid Encke was also able to get the Prussian King to agree to the construction of a new observatory, situated on the edge of the city at that time. A condition was that the observatory should be made available to the public on two evenings in the week.

The main instrument was a new refractor from the Munich workshop of Joseph von Fraunhofer with an inner aperture of 9 inches (24.4 cm) and an inner focal length of 4.33 meters. Humboldt submitted a request for its purchase on 9 October 1828, including a meridian circle from the instrument maker of Berlin and a chronometer from the Berlin clockmaker. As a result, six days later, Frederick William III granted 8500 thalers for the refractor, 3500 thalers for the meridian circle and 600 thalers for the chronometer. The refractor was the last great telescope from Fraunhofer that was still available in Munich. At the same time, Humboldt received from the king the authority for the storage of associated documents in the Ministr of Culture (Kultusministerium).

The Fraunhofer refractor arrived in Berlin on 3 March 1829. Today it is in the Deutsches Museum in Munich. On 7 April 1829, five days before the departure of Humboldt on his Russian expedition, he received a royal commission for the new observatory project planned by the architect Karl Friedrich Schinkel and its construction at the desired location. After his return, on 1 May 1830, Humboldt requested Schinkel by letter for a design. On 10 August 1830, the purchase of a building plot for the new observatory was authorized.

The tower of the old observatory served as Telegraphenstation 1 between 1832 and 1849, one of the 62 stations of the Prussian optical telegraph from Berlin via Köln to Koblenz. On 3 July 1903 the tower was torn down. The entire area of the Marstall complex between Dorotheenstraße and Unter den Linden was taken over in 1914 by the Berlin State Library.

=== New Berlin Observatory ===
The construction of the new Berlin Observatory proceeded from a cabinet order of 10 November 1830 according to the design of Schinkel. An approximately one hectare plot was acquired at a price of 15,000 thalers in the present-day area of Berlin-Kreuzberg. The foundation stone was laid on 22 October 1832 and the observatory was ready by 1835, on the area currently bounded by the streets Friedrichstraße, Besselstraße and Lindenstraße. The southern end of the Charlottenstraße was later named Enckeplatz in honor of the director at that time and the observatory acquired the address of Enckeplatz 3 A (now: Enckestraße 11).

The two-storey building was a plastered building "in simple Hellenic style" as a link between the modern and antique. The building laid out in cruciform plan-form and extended to the east with its longest arm. At the meeting point of the arms of the cross a rotating iron dome was placed with a diameter of 7.5 metres. It was the first observatory dome in Prussia in the form of a hemisphere with a slit opening and rotation mechanism. The foundations of the actual observatory were separate from the other buildings, to avoid transmission of vibrations. Under the dome was the library. In the upper storey were further observational spaces as well as scientific work areas. The long east wing housed the living quarters of the director on the ground floor and was adorned with a temple front, which as the main frontage showed the God of Light Apollo with a quadriga in relief on the gables. To the east of the building stood a small house with the living quarters of the castellan.

The observatory got a meridian circle from Karl Pistor.

On 24 April 1835 Encke could move into the new observatory, along with his newly appointed assistant Johann Gottfried Galle. On 19 May the first observations were carried out, although the building was only fully finished at the end of 1835. Galle had applied to become assistant to Encke a considerable time before the building became ready for occupancy.

From May to August 1835 the Königsberg astronomer Friedrich Wilhelm Bessel carried out pendulum observations in the "little magnetic house" (Magnetisches Häuschen) in the grounds of the observatory (see Freydanck's painting on this page) for the creation of a new Prussian measurement of length. In 1837, Encke discovered with the Fraunhofer refractor the gap in the rings of Saturn, later on named after him, with the Fraunhofer refractor, and in 1838 Galle discovered a further dark ring of Saturn – the C-Ring, as well as three new comets from 1839 to 1840.

On 23 September 1846, Galle and astronomy student Heinrich Louis d'Arrest, since 1845 assistant at the observatory, discovered the planet Neptune, on the basis of positional calculations send by the Frenchman Urbain Le Verrier. After an initial lack of success they conferred the Le Verrier data with a newly published sheet of the Berliner Akademische Sternkarte, edited by the Prussian Academy of Science. The letter from Le Verrier had coincidentally reached his close acquaintance Galle on the same day as Encke's 55th birthday, who gave his permission to search around the given celestial positions. At other observatories, the request of the French astronomer was viewed as not having sufficiently promising chances of success, of detecting another large planet on the basis of the deviations between theory and observations for the orbit of Uranus. This included Paris Observatory, whose director Le Verrier later became. By virtue of the discovery of Neptune, Berlin Observatory gained worldwide renown.

Beyond that, they did much work on the calculation of orbits of comets and asteroids. Galle was called to become director of the observatory in Breslau in 1851. In 1852 Karl Christian Bruhns was added as second assistant to Encke and in 1854 became first assistant. In 1855, Wilhelm Foerster received a position as second assistant. From 1857, Giovanni Schiaparelli studied at the institution for two years. When Bruhns transferred to Leipzig in 1860, Foerster became his successor as first assistant. In the same year Foerster, together with his co-worker Otto Lesser, discovered the asteroid (62) Erato. After Encke fell ill in 1863, he stood in as his deputy and in 1865, the year Encke died, he became director of the observatory. The observatory at this time was the most important astronomical research and educational institution in Germany. In 1873, Viktor Knorre came as Observator; by 1887 he had discovered the asteroids (158) Koronis, (215) Oenone, (238) Hypatia und (271) Penthesilea. From 1884 until the beginning of the 1890s, Karl Friedrich Küstner was also employed as Observator; he discovered in this time the polar motion as a result of his measurement activities. From 1866 to 1900, Arthur Auwers compiled, in Berlin, his Catalogues of Fundamental Stars (Fundamentalkatalog, a comprehensive star catalog containing 170000 stars.

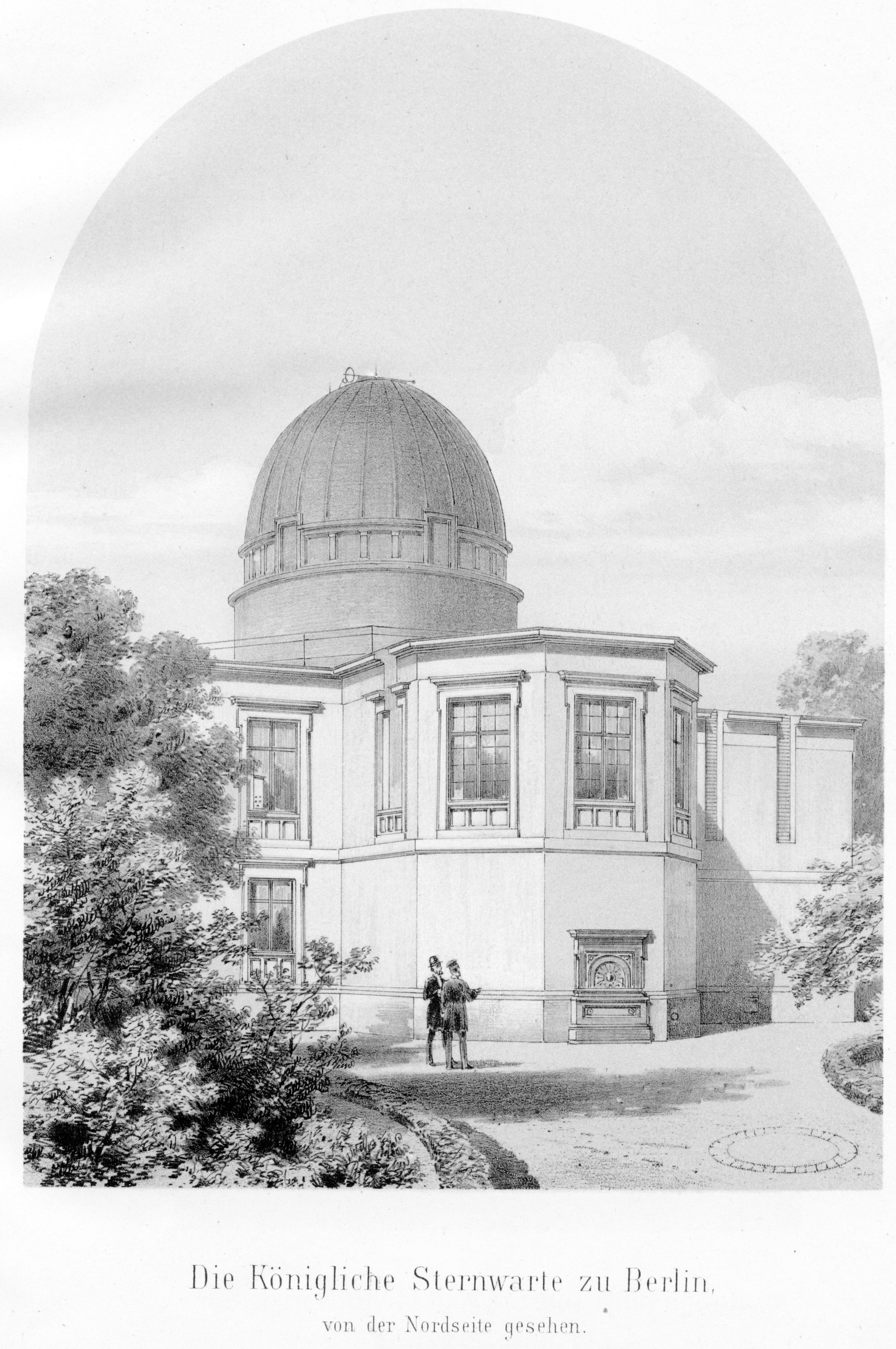
The North Wing with the height datum of 1879

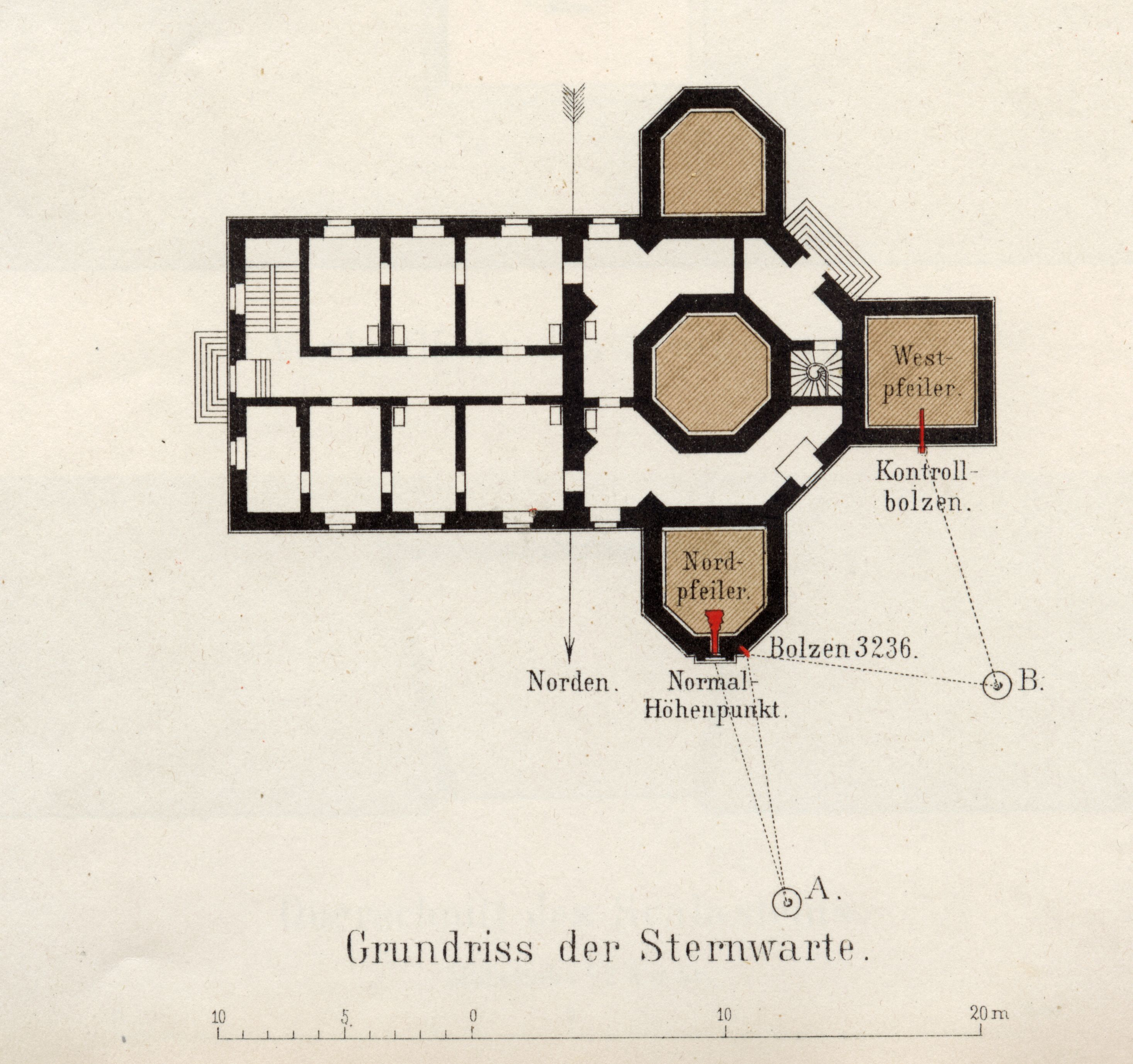
Plan of the new Berlin Observatory of 1879

On the north wing of the observatory was the height reference point for Prussia, known in German as Normalnull. The marking was formally presented on the 82nd birthday of Kaiser Wilhelm I on 22 March 1879. This point was derived from the Amsterdam Ordnance Datum and marked off 37 meters over zero.

Wilhelm Foerster led the observatory until the end of his life in 1903. It was his impulse that led to the erection of the Astrophysikalischen Observatoriums Potsdam in 1874 for on the Telegrafenberg in Potsdam. On the Telegrafenberg stood formerly the Telegraphenstation 4, which gave the hill its name. In the same year Foerster founded the Berlin Astronomisches Rechen-Institut (as Rechen-Institut zur Herausgabe des Berliner Astronomischen Jahrbuchs), on the basis of the ever-growing extent of calculation of astronomical ephemerides, which occupied its own building at Lindenstraße 91, but on the grounds and in association with the observatory. Most of the astronomers now worked in this theoretical section – separate from the practical, observational section. The section was led by Friedrich Tietjen, who had been working at the observatory since 1861. In 1865 he discovered the asteroid (86) Semele. After Tietjens death, Julius Bauschinger was called to Berlin in 1896 as his successor. In the following year he achieved in making the institute fully independent of the observatory. In 1912 it moved into a new building in Berlin-Lichterfelde. In 1944 it was placed under the control of the Navy and transferred to Sermuth in Saxony to avoid the bombing. After the Second World War the greater part was brought to Heidelberg in 1945. Only a small remaining section returned to the observatory, which by now had moved to Potsdam-Babelsberg and was again incorporated in 1956.

Because Foerster was not a member of the Academy, the Observatory was separated from the Academy in 1889 and affiliated to the Berlin University. The original Academy Observatory had already been used by the University since the founding of Berlin University in 1809. In 1890, Friedrich Simon Archenhold became a worker at the Observatory and erected on the instructions of Foerster a photographic outpost on the Halensee in Grunewald for the photographing of nebulae.

At the end of the 19th century, the rapid growth of Berlin led to the fact that the Observatory which was once on the edge of the city was now fully surrounded by buildings, and therefore observational activities were nearly impossible to a level required for research. In the middle of the 1890s, Wilhelm Foerster and others proposed the building of a new observatory outside of the metropolitan area.

In 1904, Hermann von Struve took over the directorate of the observatory. Under his leadership, research was considerably extended, and the project of yet another move took on concrete form. After test observations in the surrounding area starting from June 1906 by Paul Guthnick, who had been active at the observatory as Observator since 1906, following on from his training as an assistant at the observatory from 1901 to 1903, the decision made by the Kultusministeriums fell in favor of his recommended location in the Schlosspark Babelsberg in Potsdam.

The location given up on the Lindenstraße was listed by the International Astronomical Union (IAU) under their observatory codes as 548.

A few of the observational instruments went to the new location: a new 30 cm refractor von Zeiss-Repsold, a meridian circle from Pistor & Martins dating from 1868 with 19 cm aperture and 2.6 m focal length, a 6 Zoll (inch) refractor from and a 4 1/2 Zoll refractor from Merz & Mahler. After the demolition of the building itself, part of the grounds were used in 1912 for a new road, which has been called Enckestraße since 1927. From 1913, the street was built up with, among others, the (1922).

=== Berlin-Babelsberg Observatory ===
Babelsberg Observatory (Berlin)

In 1913, the Berlin Observatory moved again after 78 years in its second home to Babelsberg (since then it is often referred to as Babelsberg Observatory). The Observatory in Kreuzberg was cleared out and torn down in August 1913. The sale of the land covered the cost of the construction of the new building (1.1 million goldmarks and the purchase of new instruments to the sum of 450000 goldmarks). The land itself on the Babelsberg in the Schlosspark cost the Royal establishment nothing. The hill giving the area its name is situated about three kilometers north-east of the Telegrafenberg.

The construction of the main building was carried out between 1911 and 1913 by Mertins, W. Eggert, Beringer and E. Wagnernach, following the design of Thür and Brüstlein. The move was supervised by the precision engineering company, who also manufactured an astrograph and a meridian circle.

The first of the new instruments arrived in spring 1914. In the year after, the placing of a 65 cm refractor was completed; it was the first large astronomical instrument from Carl Zeiss in Jena. In 1924 followed the completion of a 120 cm reflecting telescope, at the time the second-largest telescope in the world and the largest in Europe. After the Second World War, the reflecting telescope was dismantled and shipped off to the Soviet Union as reparations (a fate shared by other observing instruments) It was sent to the Crimea complete with its dome – to reconstruct the Crimean Astrophysical Observatory near Simeiz, destroyed in the war. – where it is still in service today. In 2002, the remaining torso of the building was fully restored and completed and received a new dome; since then the library of the Leibniz-Institut für Astrophysik Potsdam has been accommodated there.

Struve remained as director until his death in 1920. Up until 1918 it was still called Königliche Sternwarte zu Berlin-Babelsberg (or Berlin-Neubabelsberg), and then from 1918 until 1946 it became the Universitätssternwarte zu Berlin-Babelsberg (University Observatory at Berlin-Babelsberg). After Hermann Struve, the directorship passed over to Paul Guthnick in 1921, who remained as a long-serving director until 1946. Apart from this post, his main body of work concerned the photometry of stars and the investigation of variable stars with a new photometer.

The new location in the original Schlosspark was a part of the Gemeinde. The "villa settlement" of Neubabelsberg was united in 1938 with the town of to form the town of Babelsberg. Then almost straightaway in 1939 this became incorporated into Potsdam. The designation "Berlin-Babelsberg" was nevertheless retained by the observatory for a few years still. Only after 1945 was the word Berlin discarded.

By virtue of the nationalization of the Sonnenberg Observatory the Universitätssternwarte Berlin-Babelsberg took it on as a new department in 1931, i.e. an out-station in.

=== Directors and other workers ===
Directors of Berlin Observatory:

1. 1700–1710: Gottfried Kirch (1639–1710)
2. 1710–1716: Johann Heinrich Hoffmann (1669–1716)
3. 1716–1740: Christfried Kirch (1694–1740)
4. 1740–1745: Johann Wilhelm Wagner (1681–1745)
5. 1745–1749: Augustin Nathanael Grischow (1726–1760)
6. 1752: Joseph Jérôme Le Francais de Lalande (1732–1807)
7. 1754: Johann Kies (1713–1781)
8. 1755: Franz Ulrich Theodosius Aepinus (1724–1802)
9. 1756–1758: Johann Jakob Huber (1733–1798)
10. 1758: Johann Albert Euler (1734–1800)
11. 1764–1787: Johann III Bernoulli (1744–1807)
12. 1787–1825: Johann Elert Bode (1747–1826)
13. 1825–1863: Johann Franz Encke (1791–1865)
14. 1865–1903: Wilhelm Julius Foerster (1832–1921)
15. 1904–1920: Karl Hermann von Struve (1854–1920)
16. 1921–1946: Paul Guthnick (1879–1947)

Other workers at the old observatory included, for example, Johann Friedrich Pfaff, and at the new one, for example, Johann Heinrich von Mädler, Gustav Spörer, Franz Friedrich Ernst Brünnow, Robert Luther, Friedrich August Theodor Winnecke, Ernst Becker, Wilhelm Oswald Lohse, Adolf Marcuse, Eugen Goldstein, Erwin Freundlich and Georg von Struve.

== Selected accomplishments ==
- Johann Franz Encke observed a broad variation in the brightness of the A Ring of Saturn in 1837. The Encke Division was later named in honor of his observations of Saturn's rings.
- Johann Gottfried Galle discovered Saturn's C-ring in 1838.
- Johann Gottfried Galle and his assistant Heinrich Louis d'Arrest discovered Neptune in 1846, near the position computed by Urbain Le Verrier.
- From 1866 to 1900, Arthur Auwers published his fundamental star catalog of 170,000 stars (Fundamental-Catalog für Zonenbeobachtungen am Südhimmel und südlicher Polar-Catalog für die Epoche 1900).

== See also ==
- List of astronomical observatories
