= Maria Margaretha Kirch =

German astronomer (1670–1720)

- Born: Maria Margaretha Winkelmann; 25 February 1670; Panitzsch (now Borsdorf), Electorate of Saxony
- Died: 29 December 1720 (aged 50); Berlin, Kingdom of Prussia
- Spouse: Gottfried Kirch (m. 1692, d. 1710)
- Children: Christfried, Christine,Margaretha
- Awards: Gold medal of Royal Academy of Sciences, Berlin (1709)
- Scientific career
- Fields: Mathematics and astronomy

Maria Margaretha Kirch (née Winckelmann, in historic sources named Maria Margaretha Kirchin; 25 February 1670 – 29 December 1720) was a German astronomer. She was one of the first famous astronomers of her period due to her writing on the conjunction of the sun with Saturn, Venus, and Jupiter in 1709 and 1712 respectively.

== Early life ==
Maria was educated from an early age by her father, a Lutheran minister, who believed that she deserved an education equivalent to that given to young boys. By the age of 13 she had lost both her father and mother. By that time, she had also received a general education from her brother-in-law Justinus Toellner and the well-known self taught astronomer Christoph Arnold, who lived nearby in the town of Sommerfeld and was credited with being the first to discover a passing comet. She became Arnold's unofficial apprentice and later his assistant, living with him and his family. Astronomy was not organized entirely along guild lines during this time period. As a result, the journey to become an astronomer often looked very different on a case by case basis.

Through Arnold, Maria met the famous German astronomer and mathematician Gottfried Kirch, who was 30 years her senior and had received training in astronomy by Johannes Hevelius and a formal education at the University of Jena. They married in 1692, later having four children, all of whom followed their parents by studying astronomy. Kirch benefited from his union with Maria in that he had a wife to take care of his children and an assistant to run calculations, gather data, and otherwise assist him. Meanwhile, Maria was able to continue her education in astronomy. Without their union, it is unlikely that Maria would have been able to participate in astronomy independently. In 1700, the couple moved to Berlin, as the elector ruler of Brandenburg Frederick III, later Frederick I of Prussia, had appointed Gottfried Kirch as the Astronomer Royal, a position awarded to an eminent astronomer.

== Career, observations, and publications ==
1–15 January of the Chur-Brandenburgischer Calendar for 1701 - The first column lists the days in the week, the second column gives the name day, the third column predicts the zodiac in which the moon would stand that day, while the fourth column either contains astronomical information – 1 January conjunction of Saturn and Mars, 9 January new moon – or vague weather predictions – 12 and 13 January snow or just rain. At the bottom of the page, the daylight hours, and the time the sun rises and sets are predicted for every fifth day.

Women were not afforded journeyman years during their apprenticeship, which left them dependent on those in their household for training. As a result, Gottfried Kirch gave his wife further instruction in astronomy, as he did for his sister and all his children starting from a young age. Due to societal norms and beliefs of the given time period, women were not allowed to attend universities in Germany. This did not completely exclude women from practicing astronomy, however, because the work of astronomy and the observation of the heavens took place largely outside the universities. The majority of astronomers during this time period did not have official degrees in astronomy. Instead, most astronomers held degrees in medicine, law, or theology. Prominent scientific universities in Kirch's time included the French Academie Royal des Sciences, Berlin Akademie der Wissenschaften and the Royal Society of London, all of which catered to a male audience. Thus, Kirch became one of the few women active in astronomy in the 1700s. She became widely known as the Kirchin, the feminine version of the family name. It was not unheard of in the Holy Roman Empire that a woman should be active in astronomy. Maria Cunitz, Elisabeth Hevelius, and Maria Clara Eimmart had been active astronomers in the seventeenth century.

Through an edict, Friedrich III introduced a monopoly for calendars in Brandenburg, and later Prussia, imposing a calendar tax. The income from this monopoly was to pay astronomers and members of the Berlin Academy of Sciences that Friedrich III founded in July 1700. Friedrich III also went on to build an observatory that was inaugurated in January 1711. Assisted by his wife, Gottfried Kirch prepared the first calendar of a series, entitled Chur-Brandenburgischer Verbesserter Calender Auff das Jahr Christi 1701, which became very popular.

Maria and Gottfried worked together as a team. In typical guild fashion she advanced from her position as Arnold's apprentice, to become assistant to her husband. Her husband had studied astronomy at the University of Jena and had served as apprentice to Johannes Hevelius. At the academy she worked as his unofficial, but recognised assistant. Women's position in the sciences was akin to their position in the guilds, valued, but subordinate. Together they made observations and performed calculations to produce calendars and ephemerides. From 1697, the Kirchs also began recording weather information. Their data was used to produce calendars and almanacs and it was also very useful in navigation. The Academy of Sciences in Berlin handled sales of their calendars.

During the first decade of her work at the academy as her husband's assistant, Kirch would observe the heavens, every evening starting at 9 p.m. During such a routine observation she discovered a comet. On 21 April 1702, Kirch identified the so-called "Comet of 1702" (C/1702 H1). Today there is no doubt about Kirch's priority in discovering C/1702 H1. However, at the time her husband was credited with the discovery. In his notes from that night her husband recorded:

Early in the morning (about 2:00 AM) the sky was clear and starry. Some nights before, I had observed a variable star and my wife (as I slept) wanted to find and see it for herself. In so doing, she found a comet in the sky. At which time she woke me, and I found that it was indeed a comet... I was surprised that I had not seen it the night before.

While Kirch was the first to identify the object as a comet, it had, unbeknownst to her, been independently sighted (but not properly identified) during the previous night by Italian astronomers Francesco Bianchini and Giacomo Filippo Maraldi. As a result, Bianchini and Maraldi were given official credit for the comet's discovery under primacy rules.

Germany's only scientific journal at the time, Acta Eruditorum, was in Latin. Kirch's subsequent publications in her own name were all in German. At the time, her husband did not hold an independent chair at the academy and the Kirchs worked as a team on common problems. The couple observed the heavens together: he observed the north and she the south, making observations that a single person could not have conducted accurately.

Kirch continued to pursue her astronomy work, publishing in German under her own name, and with the proper recognition. Her publications, which included her observations on the Aurora Borealis (1707), the pamphlet Von der Conjunction der Sonne des Saturni und der Venus on the conjunction of the sun with Saturn and Venus (1709), and the approaching conjunction of Jupiter and Saturn in 1712 became her lasting contributions to astronomy. Before Kirch, the only female astronomer in the Holy Roman Empire who had published under her own name had been Maria Cunitz. The family friend and vice president of the Berlin Academy of Sciences, Alphonse des Vignoles said in Kirch's eulogy: "If one considers the reputations of Frau Kirch and Frau Cunitz, one must admit that there is no branch of science… in which women are not capable of achievement, and that in astronomy, in particular, Germany takes the prize above all other states in Europe."

In 1709 Berlin Academy of Sciences president Gottfried von Leibniz presented her to the Prussian court, where Kirch explained her sightings of sunspots. He said about her:

There is a most learned woman who could pass as a rarity. Her achievement is not in literature or rhetoric but in the most profound doctrines of astronomy... I do not believe that this woman easily finds her equal in the science in which she excels... She favors the Copernican system (the idea that the sun is at rest) like all the learned astronomers of our time. And it is a pleasure to hear her defend that system through the Holy Scripture in which she is also very learned. She observes with the best observers and knows how to handle marvelously the quadrant and the telescope.

After her husband died in 1710, Kirch attempted to assume his place as astronomer and calendar maker at the Royal Academy of Sciences. Her actions were representative of a well established principle that allowed widows to take over their husbands' craft after their death. Despite her petition being supported by Leibniz, the president of the academy, the executive council of the academy rejected her demand for a formal position, saying that "what we concede to her could serve as an example in the future." The council did not wish to set a precedent by appointing a woman. Despite the fact that roughly 14% of astronomers in the early 18th century were female, it was still extremely uncommon at the time for women to become members of scientific academies. Winkelmann's denial to the academy was important in that it emphasized the separation between men's and women's roles in the workplace and the normalcy of women's exclusion to scientific academies at the time and for many years after. In her petition Kirch set out her qualifications for the position. She couched her application in the terms acceptable to the times, arguing that she was well-qualified because she had been instructed by her husband in astronomical calculation and observation. She emphasized that she had engaged in astronomical work since her marriage and had worked at the academy since her husband's appointment ten years earlier. In her petition Kirch said that "for some time, while my dear departed husband was weak and ill, I prepared the calendar from his calculations and published it under his name." For Kirch, an appointment at the academy would have not been just a mark of honor but a vital source of income for her and her children. She even clarified this in her petition, explaining that her husband had not left her with sufficient means in terms of supporting herself and her family. In the old guild tradition of trades, it would have been possible for Kirch to take over her husband's position after his death, but the new institutions of science tended not to follow that tradition. Despite Maria and Gottfried both having spent years working on calendars and discovering a comet each, the one item Maria did not have that almost everyone in the Academy did was a university education.

Leibniz was the only prominent figure that supported her appeal. Unfortunately, negative opinion towards her gender outweighed her history of competent work. The Berlin Academy of Sciences secretary Johann Theodor Jablonski cautioned Leibniz "that she be kept on in an official capacity to work on the calendar or to continue with observations simply will not do." The academy was very concerned with their reputation, stating, "If she were now to be kept on in such a capacity, mouths would gape even wider." Ultimately, Winklemann's application to work at the Berlin Academy was rejected. Leibniz later tried to secure housing and salary for Winkelmann in 1711 and was able to secure housing for Winkelmann to stay in for an undetermined amount of time, however the Academy denied Leibniz's petition for Winkelmann's salary. Later in 1711, the academy relented upon Maria enough to give her a medal for her work in astronomy. Despite this, Winkelmann continued to apply for over a year to become a member of the Berlin Academy, however with Leibniz leaving Berlin in 1711, the Academy became even more adamant on refusing Maria's entrance until in early 1712 when she received the final rejection.

Kirch felt sure that her petitions were denied due to her gender. This is somewhat supported by the fact that Johann Heinrich Hoffmann, who had little experience, was appointed to her husband's place instead of her. Hoffmann soon fell behind with his work and failed to make required observations. It was even suggested that Kirch become his assistant. Kirch wrote "Now I go through a severe desert, and because... water is scarce... the taste is bitter." However, in an exceptional achievement for the times she was admitted by the Berlin Academy of Sciences.

In 1711, she published Die Vorbereitung zur grossen Opposition, a well-received pamphlet in which she predicted a new comet, followed by a pamphlet concerning Jupiter and Saturn. In 1712, Kirch accepted the patronage of Bernhard Friedrich von Krosigk, who was an enthusiastic amateur astronomer, and began work in his observatory. She and her husband had worked at Krosigk's observatory while the academy observatory was being built. At Krosigk's observatory she reached the rank of master astronomer.

After Baron von Krosigk died in 1714 Kirch moved to Danzig to assist a professor of mathematics for a short time before returning to Berlin in 1716. Kirch and her son, who had just finished university, received an offer to work as astronomers for the Russian czar Peter the Great, but preferred to remain in Berlin where she continued to calculate calendars for locales such as Nuremberg, Dresden, Breslau, and Hungary from her home.

She had trained her son Christfried Kirch and daughters Christine Kirch and Margaretha Kirch to act as her assistants in the family's astronomical work, continuing the production of calendars and almanacs as well as making observations. In 1716, her son Christfried and Johann Wilhelm Wagner were appointed observers at the academy observatory following Hoffmann's death. Kirch moved back to Berlin to act as her son's assistant together with her daughter Christine. She was once again working at the academy observatory calculating calendars. Male academy members complained that she took too prominent a role and was "too visible at the observatory when strangers visit." Kirch was ordered to "retire to the background and leave the talking to... her son." In 1717 the Berlin Academy gave Maria two options, either continue to fight for a position of her own or she could retire in the interests of her son's reputation. She chose to retire and continue her own observations at home, which the Academy requested be nearby so that her son could still dine at home without neglecting his duties at the Academy. Kirch died of a fever in Berlin on 29 December 1720.

== Publications ==
- Kirch, Gottfried; Kirch, Maria Margaretha. Das älteste Berliner Wetter-Buch 1700 - 1701. Edited by G. Hellmann. Berlin, 1893. https://www.digi-hub.de/viewer/resolver?urn=urn:nbn:de:kobv:11-d-4723758
- Kirch, Maria Margaretha. Vorbereitung, zur grossen Opposition, oder, Merckwürdige Himmels-Gestalt im 1712 Jahre, worauf im folgenden 1713 ... . Cölln an der Spree Druckts Ulrich Liebpert, könighl. Preuss. Hof-Buchdr., [1713?] http://www.worldcat.org/oclc/319882766

== See also ==
- List of astronomers
- Timeline of women in science
- Women in science
