= Margaretha Kirch =

German astronomer

- Born: Baptized 26 July 1703; Berlin, Germany
- Died: 5 May 1759
- Known for: Astronomical observations and calculations
- Parent(s): Gottfried and Maria Margaretha Kirch
- Relatives: Christfried and Christine Kirch (siblings)
- Scientific career
- Fields: Astronomy
- Workplaces: Berlin Observatory

Margaretha Kirch (bapt. 26 July 1703 – 5 May 1759) was a German astronomer from Berlin.

== Early life ==
Kirch was the daughter of the astronomers Gottfried Kirch and Maria Margarethe Kirch and the sister of Christfried Kirch. She and her sister Christine Kirch were educated in astronomy and worked as their parents' and, later, their brother's assistants.

Few details are known about her life. She was seven years old when her father died. She never married. Like her sister Christine, she was taught astronomy at the age of 10, and both initially assisted her brother Christfried with his observations. Margaretha later made observations of the weather and the starry sky, which she recorded in a weather observation diary.

== Work at the Berlin Observatory ==
In 1716, Kirch's brother accepted a permanent position in astronomy at the Academy of Sciences in Berlin and the Berlin Observatory. Kirch, her mother, and her sister worked with him at the Observatory of Berlin. Kirch and her sister Christine worked as assistants and made the astronomical observations and calculations for planetary ephemeris.

After the Great Comet C/1743 X1 had passed the sun, Margaretha observed and drew a streaky splitting of the comet's tail on March 5, which was only observed on the following four days by Joseph-Nicolas Delisle and Gottfried Heinsius in Saint Petersburg, as well as the well-known astronomer Jean-Philippe de Chéseaux in Lausanne. In particular, her observation of March 7th is also recorded in an engraving.

Like her mother and her sister, Kirch did not receive official recognition of their professional work at the observatory.

== Sources ==
- M. Ogilvie, J. Harvey, eds., The Biographical Dictionary of Women in Science – Pioneering Lives from Ancient Times to the Mid-20th Century: Volume 1 A-K. Routledge, New York and London 2000, ISBN 0-415-92039-6, pp. 1774–1775.
- R. Wielen, Thomas Hockey (Ed.): Bibliographical Encyclopedia of Astronomers. Springer, New York, 2007, ISBN 978-0-387-31022-0, p. 638.
- Seargent, D. A. J. (2009). The Greatest Comets in History: Broom Stars and Celestial Scimitars. New York: Springer. ISBN 978-0-387-09512-7.
