= W. Forster =

W. Forster is the name of:

- Walter Forster (entomologist) (1910–1986), German entomologist
- Wilhelm Julius Foerster (1832–1921), German astronomer
