= The Hammer of the Cartesians =

2013 book by David Leech

The Hammer of the Cartesians: Henry More’s Philosophy of Spirit and the Origins of Modern Atheism
- Author: David Leech
- Subject: philosophy of religion
- Published: 2013
- Publisher: Peeters Publishers
- Pages: 278 pp.
- ISBN: 978-90-429-2933-3

The Hammer of the Cartesians: Henry More's Philosophy of Spirit and the Origins of Modern Atheism is a 2013 book by David Leech, in which the author argues that Henry More's spirit conception, influential upon Isaac Newton and Samuel Clarke, contributed to a slow secularization process internal to theistic culture and believes that the origins of modern speculative atheism can be traced back to conceptual changes in early modern metaphysics. Leech won the Manfred Lautenschlaeger Award for the book.
