= Spurzem =

Spurzem may refer to:

== People ==
- Rainer Spurzem, German astrophysicist

== Geography ==
- Spurzem creek in Minnesota

== Miscellaneous ==
- The Spurzem collection of painter Gabriel Laderman
