= Eva Grebel =

German astronomer

Eva Katharina Grebel
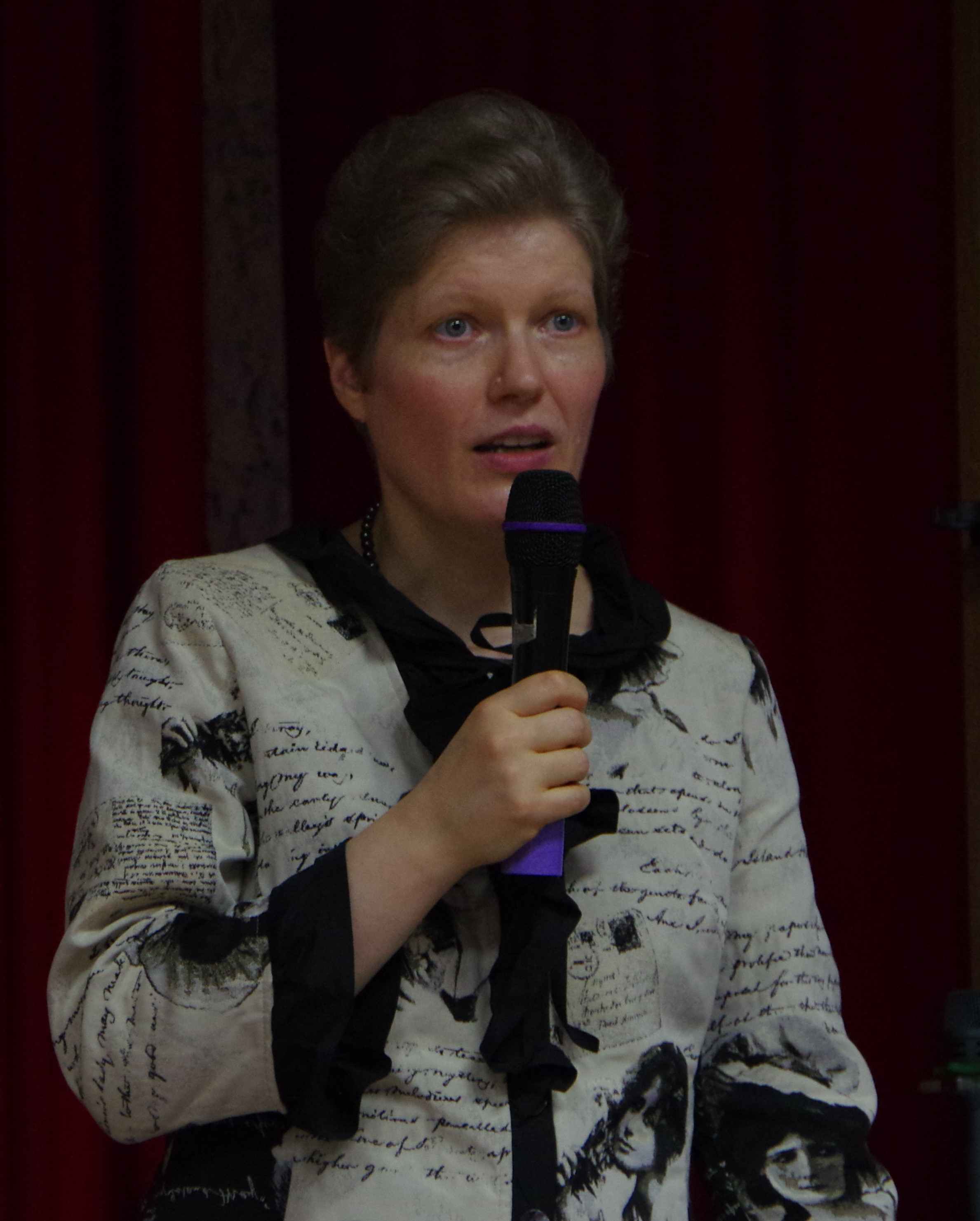
- Eva Grebel in 2014
- Born: 1966 (age 59–60); Dierdorf, Rhineland-Palatinate, Germany
- Education: University of Bonn (Diplom 1991, Ph.D. 1995)
- Known for: Studies of stellar populations and galaxy formation
- Awards: Science Prize of the Hector Foundation and Hector Academy Fellowship (2015); Member of the Heidelberg Academy of Sciences (since 2011); Lautenschläger Research Prize of the University of Heidelberg (2009); Johann Wempe Award, AIP (2006); Henri Chrétien International Research Grant Award, AAS (1999); Hubble Fellowship (1998–2000); Ludwig Biermann Award of the German Astronomical Society (1996)
- Scientific career
- Fields: Astronomy
- Workplaces: Heidelberg University; University of Basel; Stanford University; Max Planck Institute for Astronomy, Heidelberg; University of Washington, Seattle; University of California, Santa Cruz; University of Würzburg; University of Illinois, Urbana-Champaign
- Thesis: Stellar population studies in nearby galaxies (1995)

Eva K. Grebel is a German astronomer. Since 2007 she has been co-director of the Astronomisches Rechen-Institut at the University of Heidelberg in Germany. Eva Grebel is an expert in the study of stellar populations and galaxy formation.

== Research ==
Grebel's research is focused on the stars of the Milky Way galaxy and other members of the local group of galaxies, including the Large and Small Magellanic Clouds as well as nearby dwarf galaxies. Grebel's studies concern the chemical evolution and structure of galaxies, star formation and the properties of the various stellar populations, with the aim of reconstructing the origin and evolution of the Milky Way and other galaxies.

== Biography ==
Grebel studied physics and astronomy at the University of Bonn, obtaining her Diplom degree in physics in 1991. For part of the same year, she was a summer student at the Space Telescope Science Institute in Baltimore.

She took up graduate studies at the University of Bonn, spending two years in 1992–1994 as a student fellow at the European Southern Observatory's La Silla Observatory in Chile. She obtained her PhD in 1995 with distinction. Her dissertation topic was "Stellar population studies in nearby galaxies".

Subsequently, Grebel took at postdoc positions at the University of Illinois at Urbana-Champaign (1995–1996), at Würzburg University (1996–1997) and at the University of California, Santa Cruz (1997–1998). She won a Hubble Fellowship in 1998, joining the University of Washington in Seattle as a Hubble fellow 1998–2000.

In 2000, Grebel returned to Germany as a research group leader at the Max Planck Institute for Astronomy in Heidelberg. In 2003, she accepted an appointment to the chair of observational astronomy at the Astronomical Institute of the University of Basel, as the successor of Gustav Tammann. From 2004–2007, she served as the institute's director.

In 2007, Grebel was appointed a full professor of astronomy at Heidelberg University, where she also became one of two directors of the Astronomisches Rechen-Institut. At that time, Grebel was the only female full professor for astronomy in Germany.

Grebel is the chair of the DFG-Collaborative Research Center 881 "The Milky Way System" at the University of Heidelberg and president of commission H1 "The Local Universe" of the International Astronomical Union.

== Awards and prizes ==
- 2022 First winner of the Caroline Herschel Medal, a joint award from the Royal Astronomical Society and the German Astronomical Society (Astronomische Gesellschaft, AG)
- 2021 Member of the German Academy of Sciences Leopoldina
- 2015 Hector Science Award and Member of the Hector Fellow Academy
- 2006 Johann Wempe Award, AIP
- 1999 Henri Chrétien International Research Grant Award, AAS
- 1996 Ludwig Biermann Award, Astronomische Gesellschaft
