= Great Comet of 1680 =

First comet discovered by telescope

C/1680 V1 (Kirch) (Great Comet of 1680)
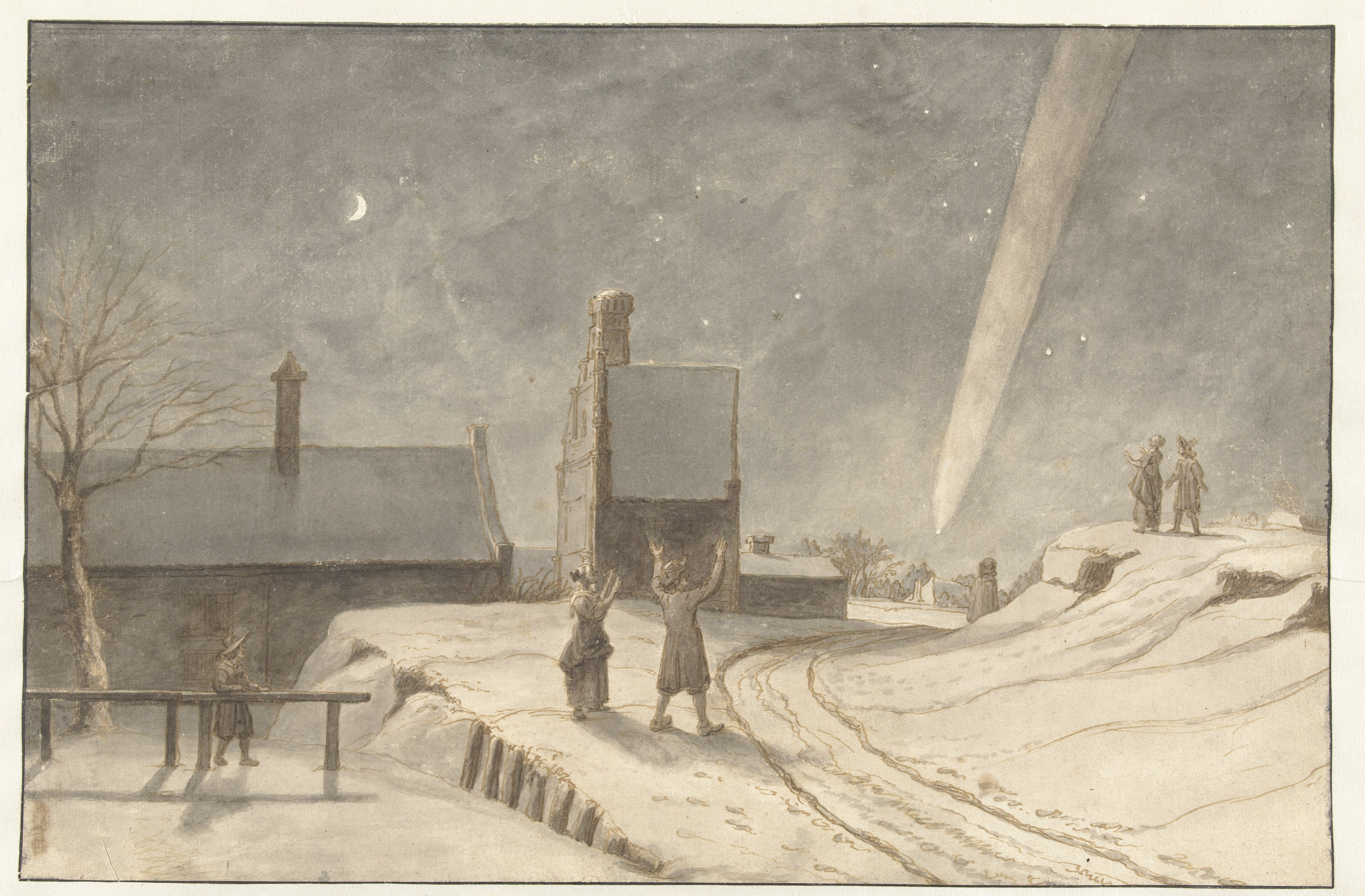
- Night landscape with the Great Comet seen on a field in Alkmaar in January 1681

Discovery
- Discovered by: Gottfried Kirch
- Discovery date: 14 November 1680

Designations
- Alternative designations: 1680 V1

Orbital characteristics
- Epoch: 1680-Nov-29.0; 2335000.5(?)
- Observation arc: 125 days
- Number of observations: 30
- Orbit type: Sungrazer
- Aphelion: 890 au
- Perihelion: 0.00622 au (1.34 R_{☉})
- Semi-major axis: 444 au
- Eccentricity: 0.999986
- Orbital period: ~10,400 yr
- Inclination: 60.7°
- Last perihelion: 18 December 1680

C/1680 V1, also called the Great Comet of 1680, Kirch's Comet, and Newton's Comet, was the first comet discovered by telescope. It was discovered by Gottfried Kirch and was one of the brightest comets of the seventeenth century. It passed about 235000 km from the surface of the Sun. (Note: The comet passed about 0.00622 AU (930,500 km) from the center of the Sun: 930500 km – Sun's radius of 695700 km = 234,800 km (145,900 mi) from the surface of the Sun.)

== Overview ==
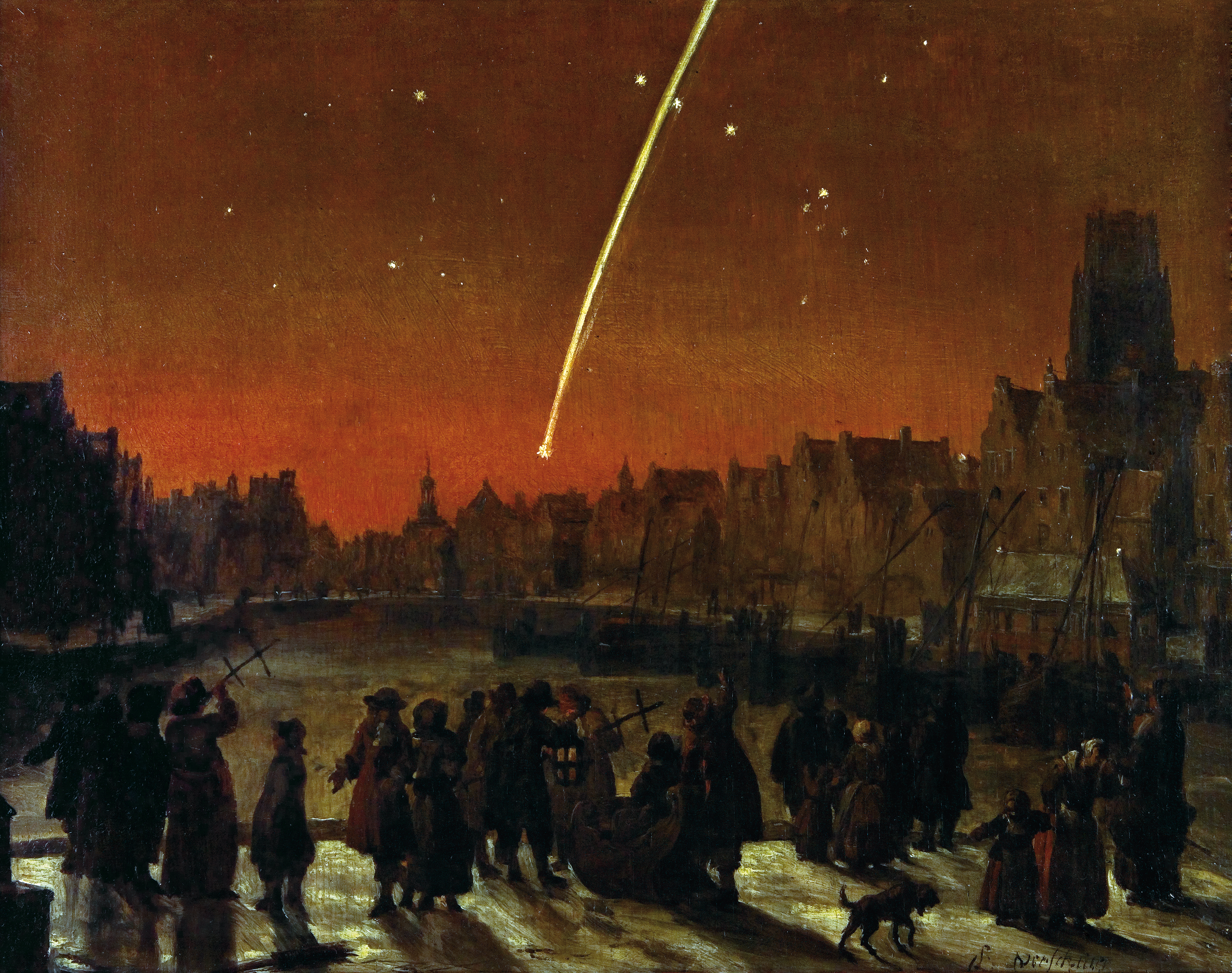
The Great Comet of 1680 over Rotterdam as painted by Lieve Verschuier

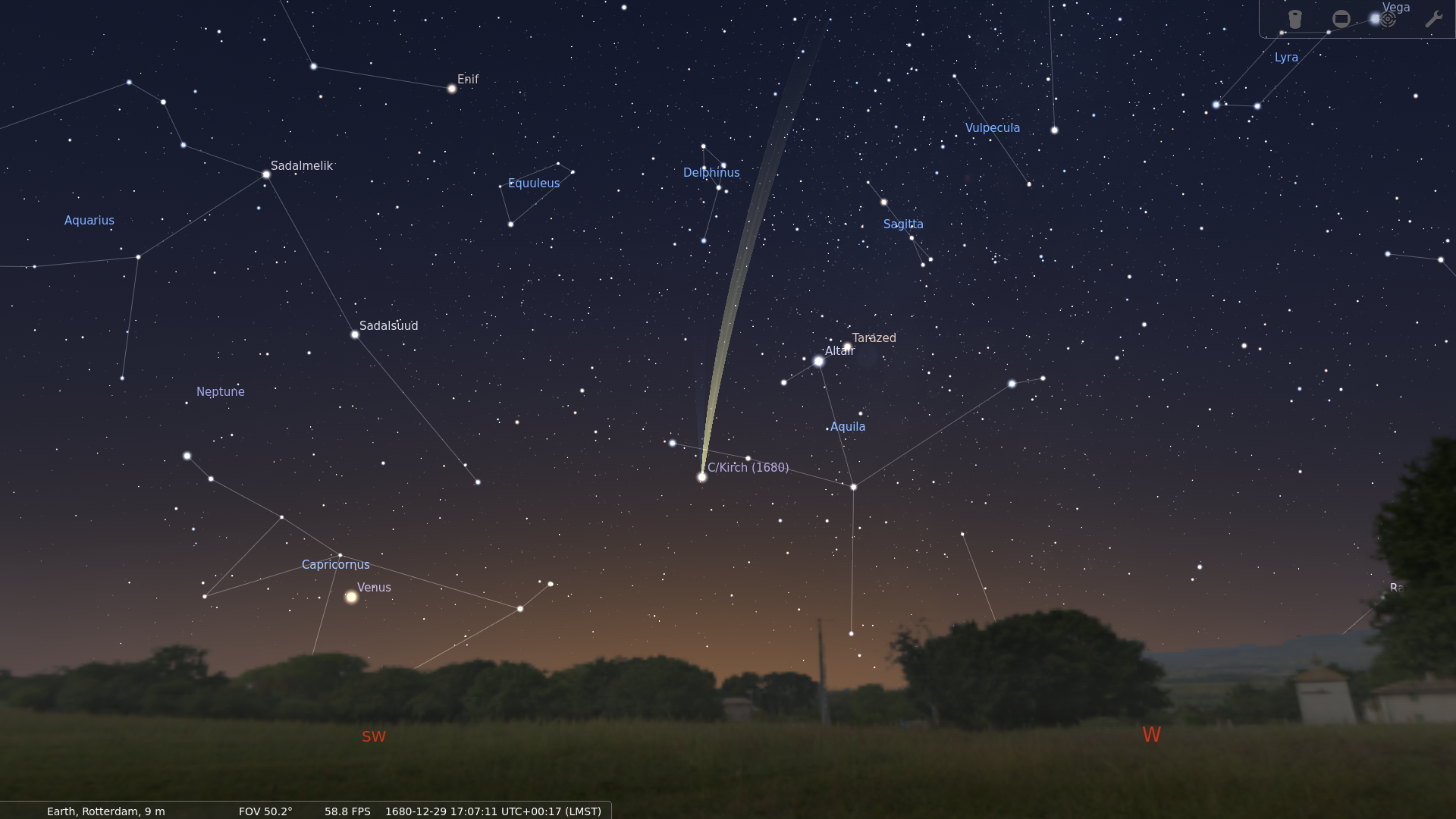
The 1680 comet seen from Rotterdam on 29 December 1680 as simulated by Stellarium

The comet was discovered by Gottfried Kirch, a German astronomer, on 14 November 1680 (New Style), in Coburg, and it became one of the brightest comets of the seventeenth century – reputedly visible even in daytime – and was noted for its spectacularly long tail. Passing 0.42 au from Earth on 30 November 1680, it sped around an extremely close perihelion of 0.00622 AU (930,000 km; 578,000 mi); or just 1.34 solar radii, 0.34 radii above the Sun's surface) on 18 December 1680, reaching its peak brightness on 29 December as it swung outward. It was last observed on 19 March 1681. JPL Horizons shows the comet has roughly a barycentric orbital period of 10,400 years. As of 2026 the comet is about 260 au (39 billion km) from the Sun.

While the Kirch Comet of 1680–1681 was discovered by – and subsequently named for – Gottfried Kirch, credit must also be given to Eusebio Kino, the Spanish Jesuit priest who charted the comet's course. During his delayed departure for Mexico, Kino began his observations of the comet in Cádiz in late 1680. Upon his arrival in Mexico City, he published his Exposición astronómica de el cometa (Astronomical Account of the Comet; Mexico City, 1681) in which he presented his findings. Kino's Exposición astronómica is among the earliest scientific treatises published by a European in the New World.

Basil Ringrose was serving under buccaneer Captain Bartholomew Sharpe and made the following observation shortly before raiding the Spanish port city of Coquimbo, Chile:

Friday, November 19th, 1680. This morning about an hour before the day we observed a comet to appear a degree N. from the bright in Libra. The body thereof seemed dull, and its tail extended itself 18 or 20 degrees in length, being of a pale colour and pointing directly N.N.W. Our prisoners hereupon reported to us that the Spaniards had seen very strange sights, both at Lima, the capital city of Peru, Guayaquil, and other places, much about the time of our coming into the South Seas.

Although it was a sungrazing comet, it was not part of the Kreutz family. Isaac Newton used the comet to test and verify Kepler's laws. John Flamsteed was the first to propose that the two bright comets of 1680–1681 were the same comet, one traveling inbound to the Sun and the other outbound, and Newton originally disputed this. Newton later changed his mind, and then, with Edmond Halley's help, purloined some of Flamsteed's data to verify this was the case without giving Flamsteed credit.

== Gallery ==
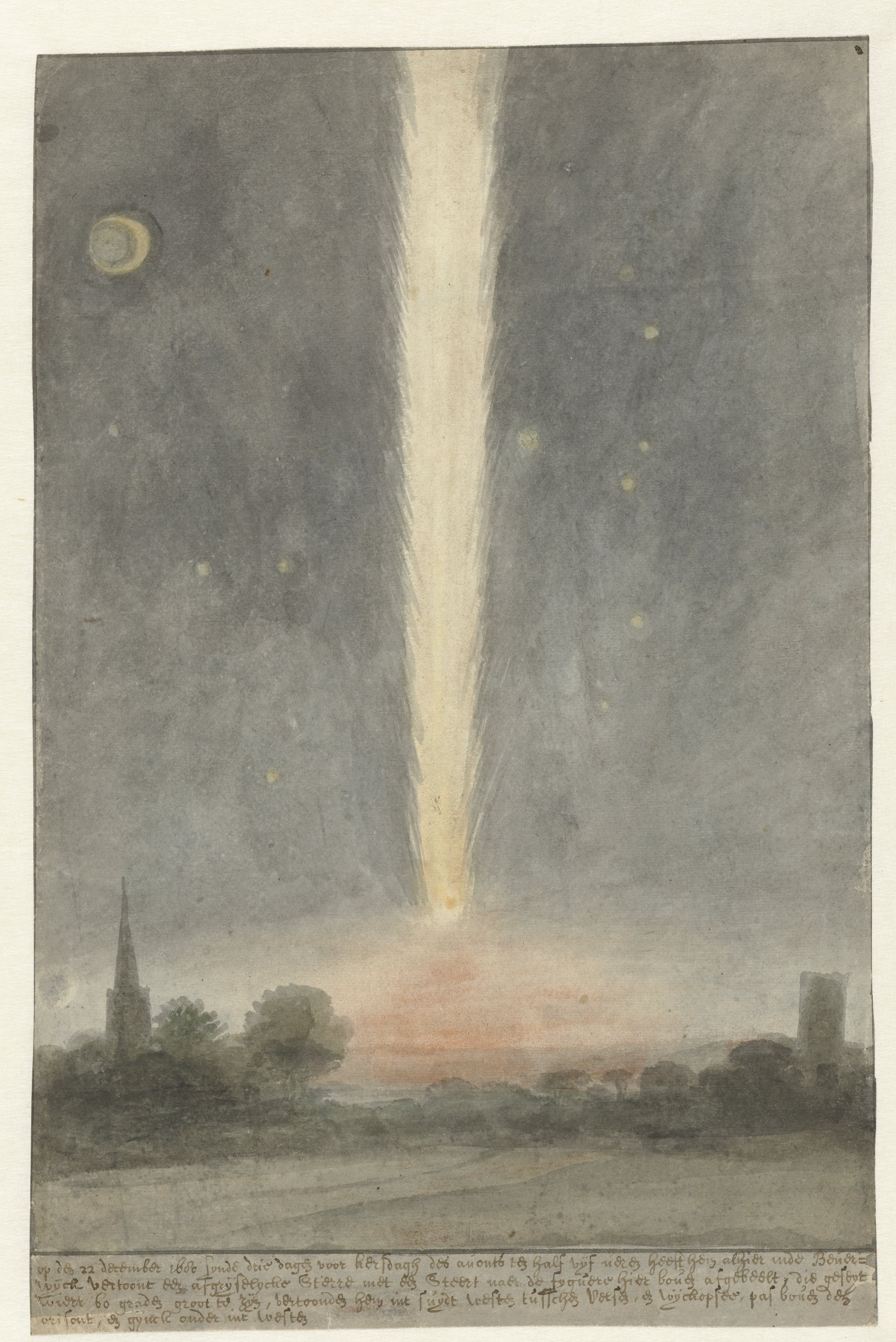
The comet as it appeared above Beverwijk on 22 December 1680.

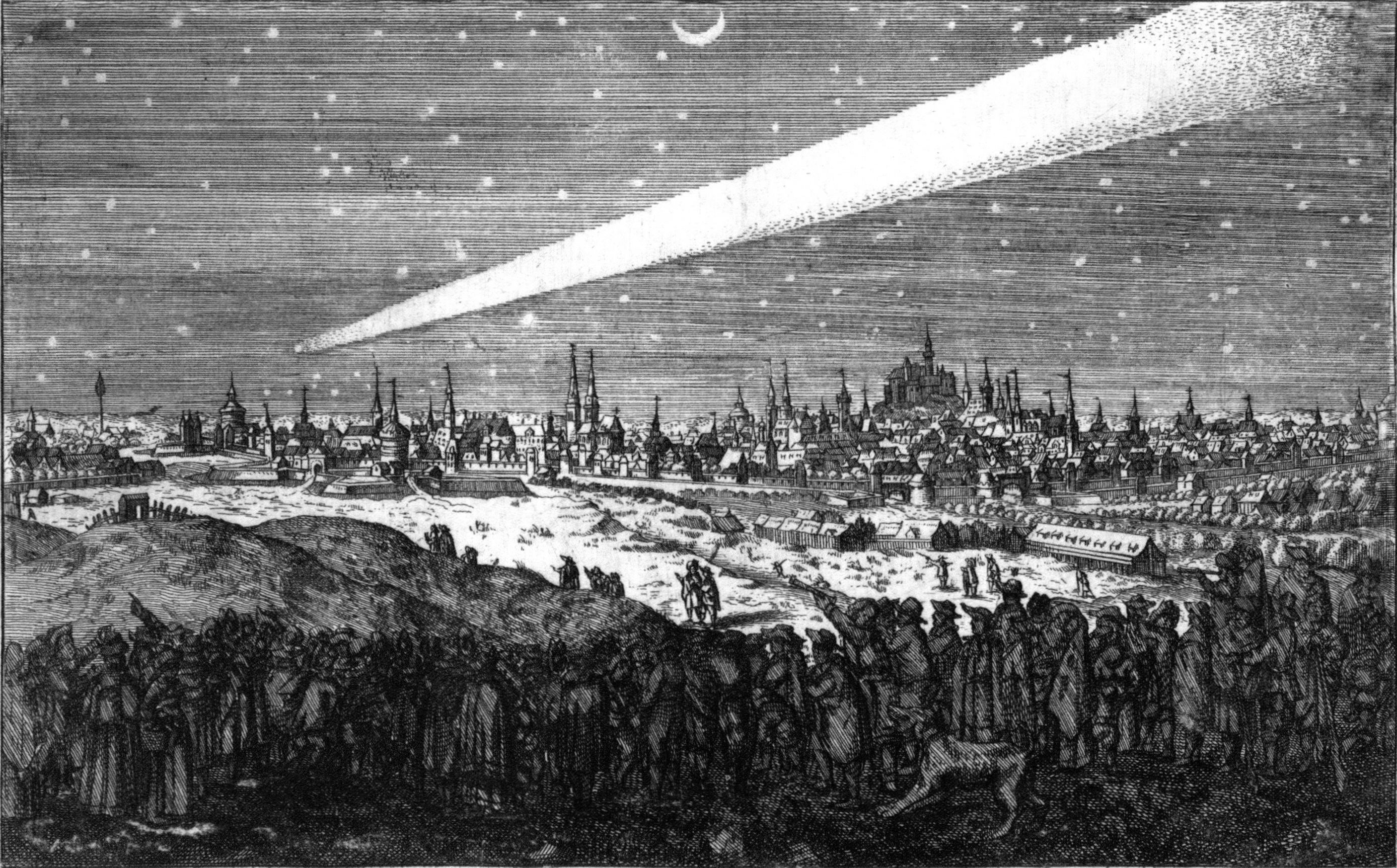
The Great Comet of 1680 over Nuremberg

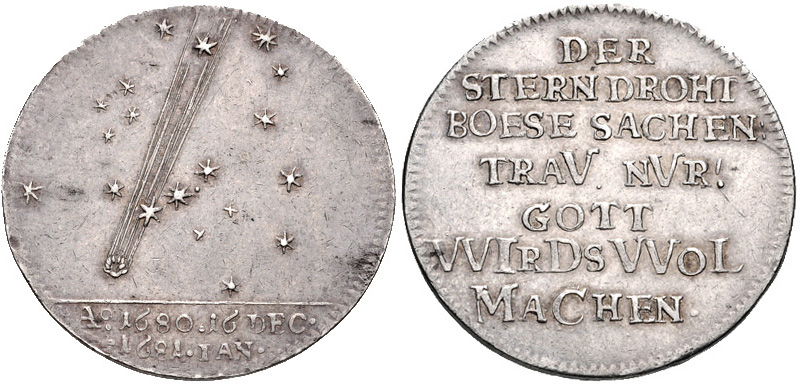
Commemorative medal depicting the comet, Hamburg, 1681

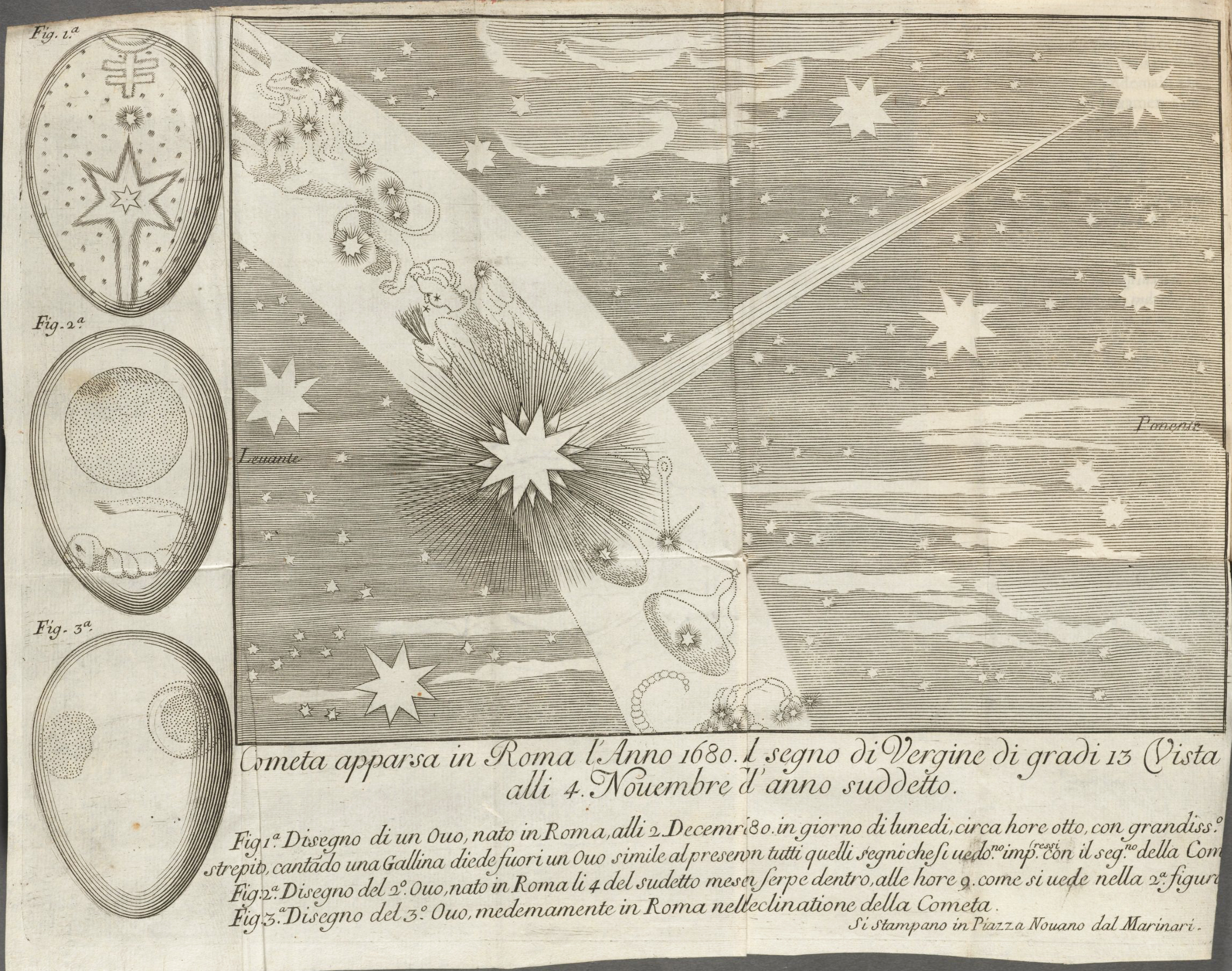
"Cometa apparsa in Roma l'Anno 1680". From an issue of Mercure Galant, published in Paris

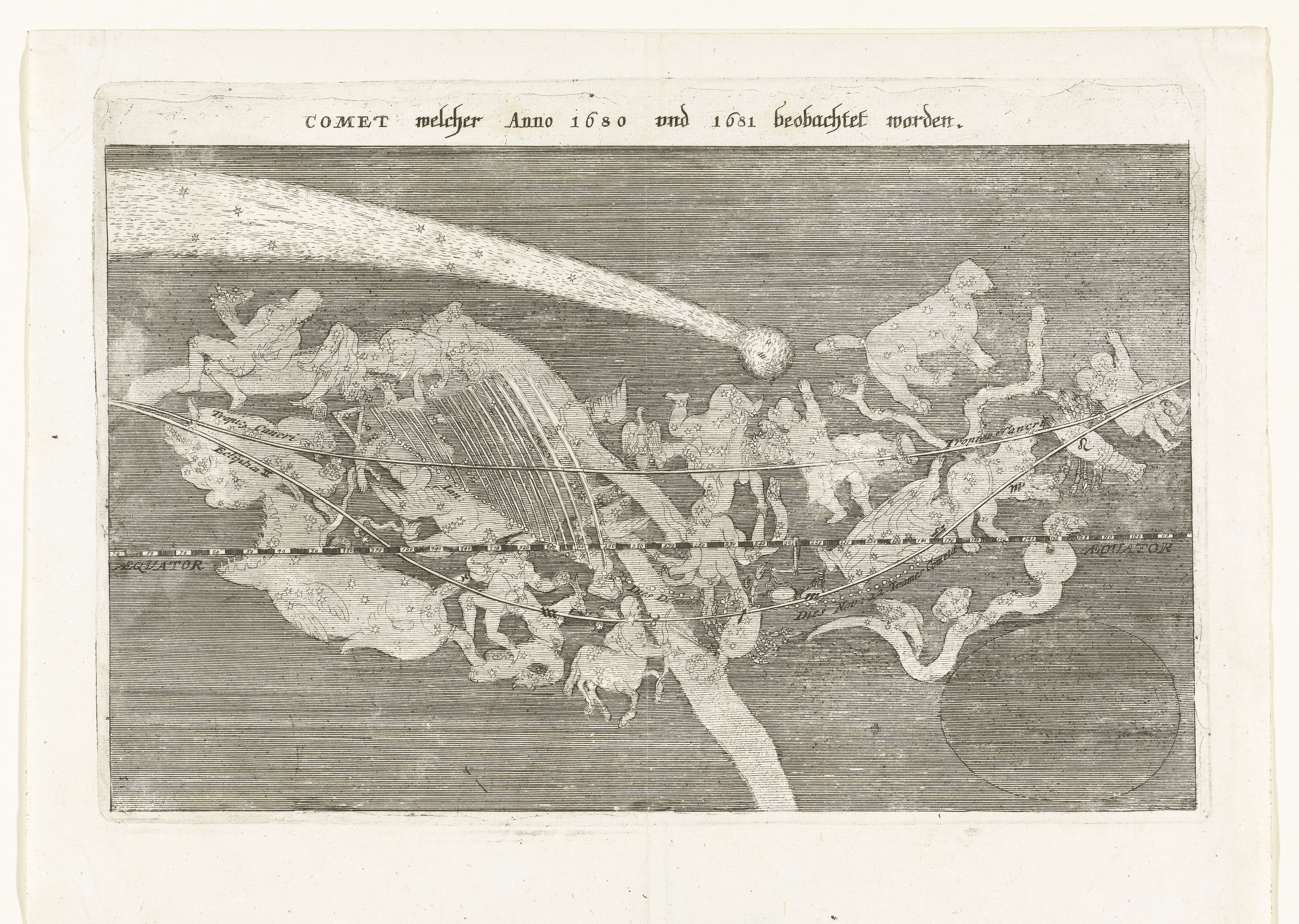
The comet on the background of the signs of the Zodiac in the winter of 1680–1681

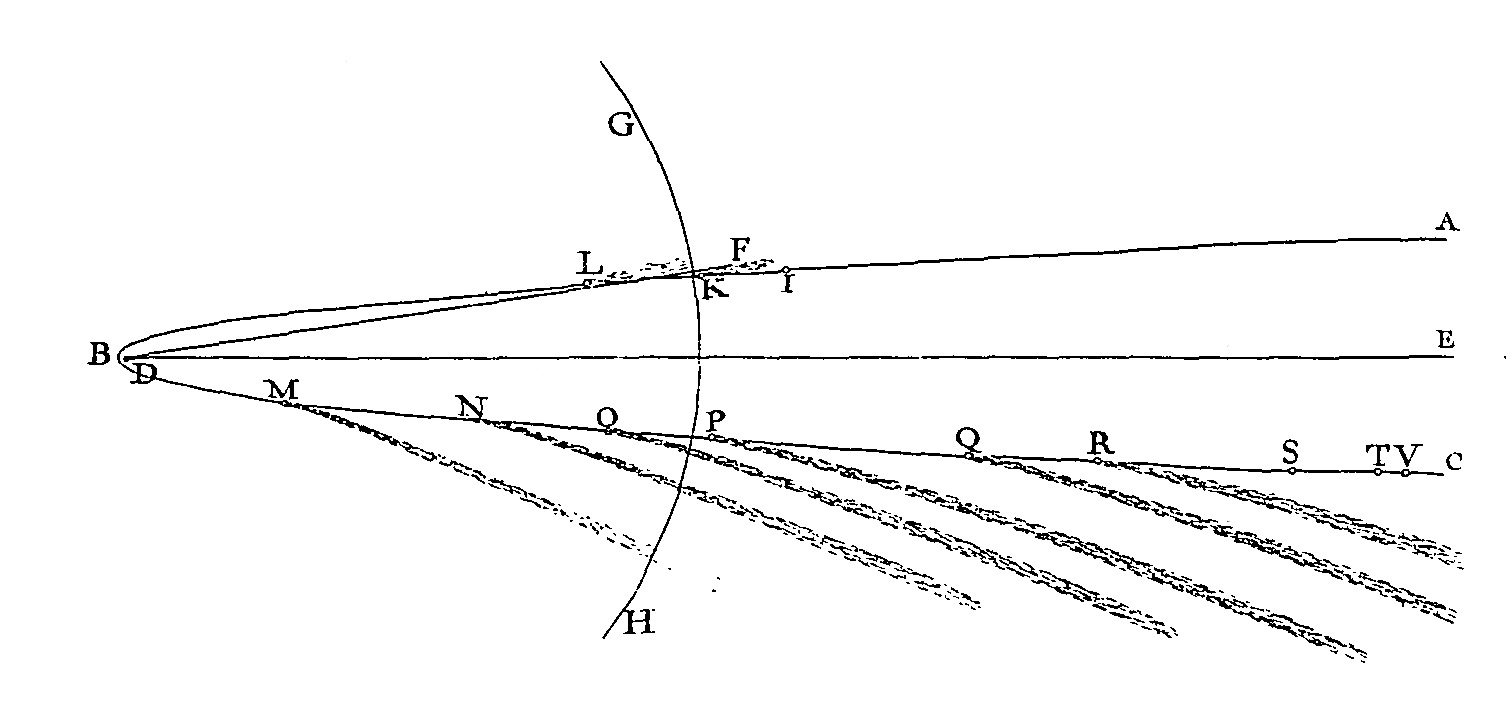
The orbit of the comet of 1680, fit to a parabola, as shown in Isaac Newton's Principia

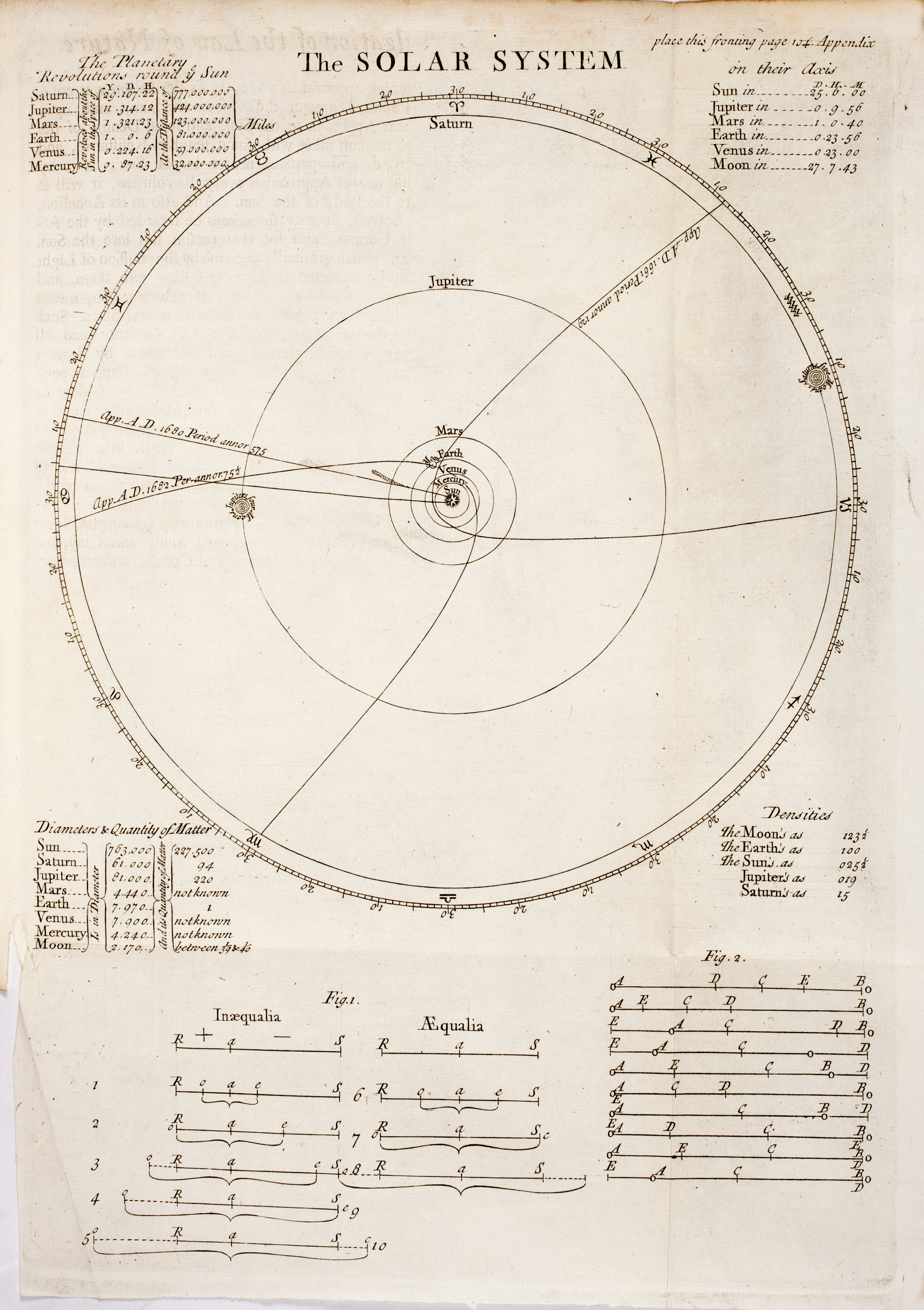
A 1727 chart of the Solar System up to the orbit of the planet Saturn, with the track of the 1680 comet, and two others

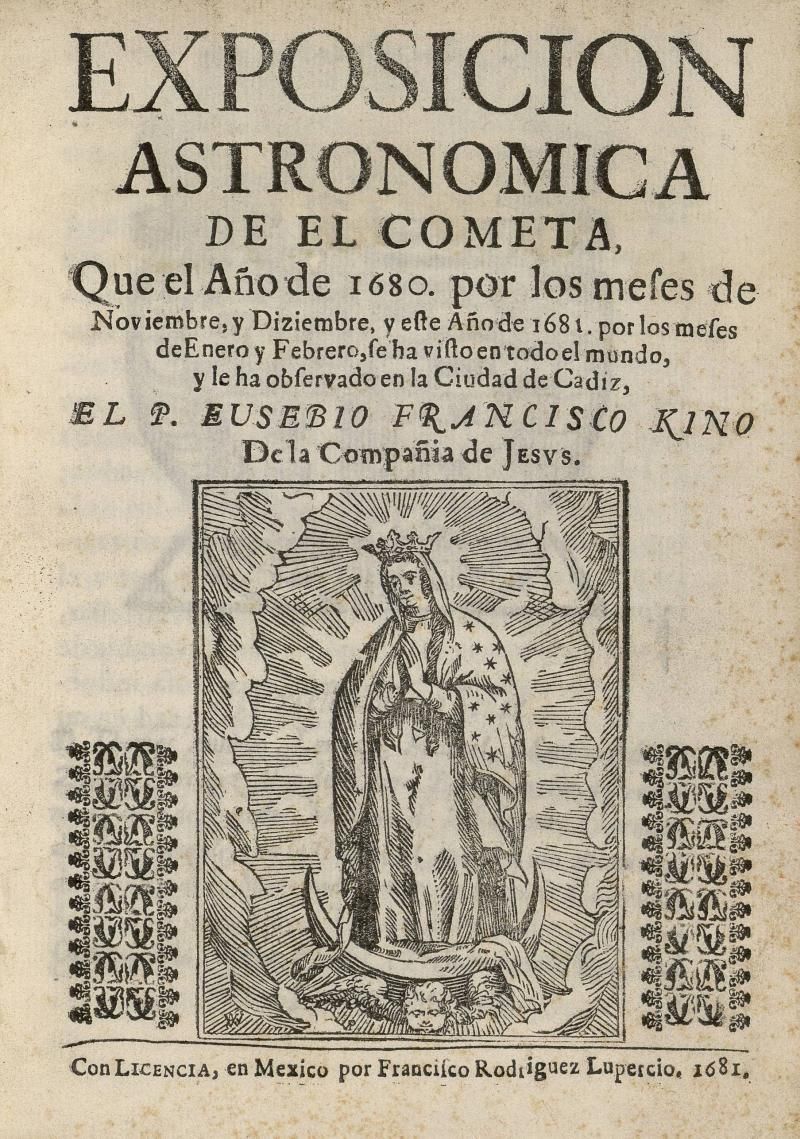
Front page of Exposisión astrónomica de el cometa by Eusebio Francisco Kino, 1681

== See also ==
- Great comet
- Halley's Comet
- Lists of comets
