= Otto Lesser =

German astronomer (1830–1887)

Asteroids discovered: 1
62 Erato^{[1]}	September 14, 1860	MPC
1. ^{1} with Wilhelm Julius Förster

Otto Leberecht Lesser (16 October 1830 – 12 August 1887) was a German astronomer who co-discovered asteroid 62 Erato with Wilhelm Julius Foerster on September 14, 1860 at the Berlin Observatory. This was the first co-discovery on record.
