= 62 Erato =

Main-belt asteroid

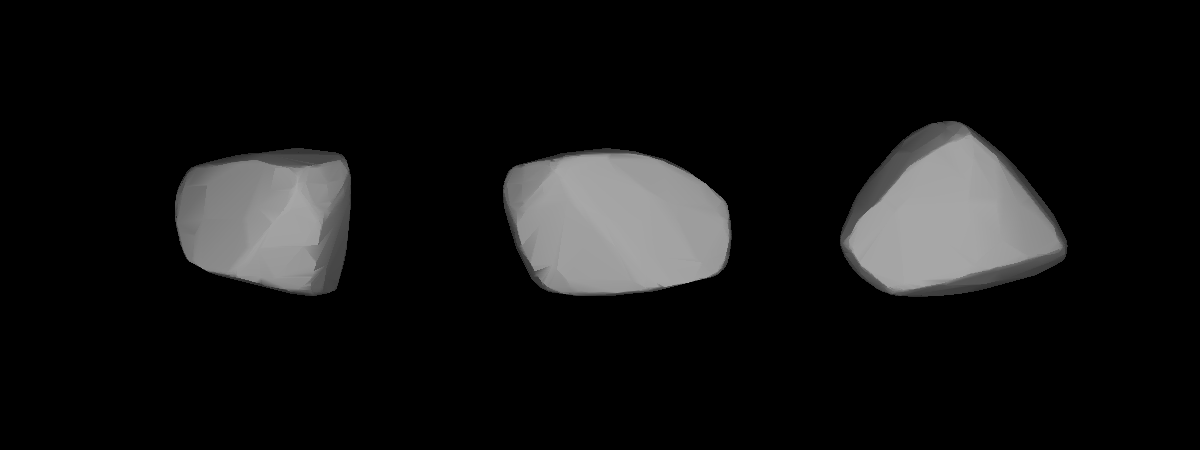
- Lightcurve-based 3D-model of Erato

Discovery
- Discovered by: Oskar Lesser; Wilhelm Julius Foerster
- Discovery date: 14 September 1860

Designations
- Pronunciation: /ˈɛrətoʊ/
- Named after: Ἐρατώ Eratō
- Minor planet category: Main-belt (middle); Themis
- Adjectives: Eratoian /ɛrəˈtoʊ.iən/

Orbital characteristics
- Epoch 31 December 2006 (JD 2454100.5)
- Aphelion: 3.679 AU (550.4 Gm)
- Perihelion: 2.566 AU (383.9 Gm)
- Semi-major axis: 3.122 AU (467.0 Gm)
- Eccentricity: 0.178
- Orbital period (sidereal): 2,015.178 d (5.52 yr)
- Mean anomaly: 161.828°
- Inclination: 2.223°
- Longitude of ascending node: 125.738°
- Argument of perihelion: 273.285°

Physical characteristics
- Mean diameter: 96.06±14.26 km (composite estimate)
- Mass: (4.6±1.8)×10^{17} kg (Note: Calculated from its standard gravitational parameter GM = 0.031±0.012 km^{3}/s^{2}.)
- Mean density: 0.73 g/cm^{3} (Note: Assuming a diameter of 107 km.)
- Synodic rotation period: 5.675±0.001 h or 9.2213±0.0007 h
- Geometric albedo: 0.061
- Spectral type: Ch (SMASSII); BU (Tholen)
- Absolute magnitude (H): 8.76

62 Erato (/ˈɛrətoʊ/) is a carbonaceous asteroid from the outer region of the asteroid belt, approximately 95 kilometers (59 miles) in diameter. It is a member of the Themis family of asteroids that share similar properties and orbital characteristics. Photometric measurements during 2004–2005 showed a rotation period of 9.2213±0.0007 h with an amplitude of 0.116±0.005 in magnitude. It is orbiting the Sun with a period of 5.52 yr, a semimajor axis of 3.122 AU, and eccentricity of 0.178. The orbital plane is inclined by an angle of 2.22° to the plane of the ecliptic.

Erato is the first asteroid to have been credited with co-discoverers, Oskar Lesser and Wilhelm Forster, who discovered it on 14 September 1860, from the Berlin Observatory. It was their first and only asteroid discovery. The name was chosen by Johann Franz Encke, director of the observatory, and refers to Erato, the Muse of lyric poetry in Greek mythology. It has also been classified as a member of the Eos family.
