= Christine Kirch =

German astronomer

Christine Kirch (1696 – 6 May 1782), was a German astronomer.

== Life ==
She was born in Guben, Holy Roman Empire. the daughter of the astronomers Gottfried Kirch and Maria Margarethe Kirch and the sister of Christfried Kirch. She and her sister Margaretha Kirch were educated in astronomy from the age of ten. As a child Kirch assisted her parents in their astronomical observations. Reportedly the young Kirch was responsible for taking time of observations by using a pendulum. As she became older Kirch was instructed in calculating calendars. She assisted first her mother and later her brother in calculating various calendars.

Until 1740 Kirch did not receive a salary for her contributions, but benefitted from small donations to her from the Berlin Academy of Sciences. Following the death of her brother Christfried the academy relied on her for assistance in calculating calendars. She took responsibility for calculating the calendar for Silesia, a province Prussia conquered in the early 1740s. The academy had a monopoly on calendars and the Silesia calendar generated significant income for the academy. Thus in 1776 Kirch received a respectable salary of 400 Thaler from the academy.

Kirch continued her calendar work for the academy up to her old age and was held in great esteem. At the age of 77 the academy elevated her to the status of emeritus, and she continued to receive a salary from the academy without being obliged to work. She introduced the astronomer Johann Bode to calendar making. She died in 1782 as a respected astronomer.
