= Eugene Rabe =

German-American astronomer (1911–1974)

Eugene Karl Rabe
- Born: May 8, 1911; Berlin, Germany, Germany
- Died: July 1974
- Known for: Study of Trojan asteroids, 433 Eros
- Scientific career
- Fields: Astronomy
- Workplaces: Astronomisches Rechen-Institut, Cincinnati Observatory

Eugene Karl Rabe (May 8, 1911 – July 1974) was a German-American astronomer.

He was born in Berlin, Germany, the son of Hermann and Luise. From 1937–1948 he was a member of the staff at the Heidelberg, Germany branch of the Astronomisches Rechen-Institut. After World War II it was arranged for him to come to the United States. He then became professor of astronomy at the University of Cincinnati, while working at the Cincinnati Observatory. His work included orbital motions of the Trojan asteroids, and particularly the orbit of 433 Eros. In 1951, he used twenty years worth of observations of Eros to determine the gravitational perturbations of the planets. From these, he calculated the most accurate masses to that date of Mercury, Venus, Mars and the Moon.

The minor planet 1624 Rabe is named after him.
