= C/1702 H1 =

Parabolic comet

C/1702 H1 (Comet of 1702)
Discovery
- Discovered by: Francesco Bianchini, Giacomo Filippo Maraldi
- Discovery date: 20 April 1702

Orbital characteristics
- Epoch: 14 March 1702 (JD 2342774.607)
- Observation arc: 11 days
- Number of observations: 5
- Perihelion: 0.6468 AU
- Eccentricity: ~1.000
- Inclination: 4.375°
- Longitude of ascending node: 193.294°
- Argument of periapsis: 309.637°
- Last perihelion: 14 March 1702

C/1702 H1, also known as the "Comet of 1702", is a comet discovered by Francesco Bianchini and Giacomo Filippo Maraldi in Rome, then part of the Papal States, on April 20, 1702.

== 1702 apparition ==
Bianchini and Maraldi discovered the comet on April 20, 1702. The comet was a short distance above the horizon and was said to resemble a "nebulous star".

The comet was independently discovered by Maria Margaretha Kirch (Berlin, Prussia) on April 21, and by Philippe de La Hire (Paris, France) on April 24.

The last observation of the comet was made by Bianchini and Maraldi on May 5, 1702.

== Orbit ==
Very similar parabolic orbits were computed for C/1702 H1 by Nicolas Louis de Lacaille (1761) and Johann Karl Burckhardt (1807).

== Closest approaches to Earth ==
- 1702-04-20: 0.0435 AU from Earth
