= Christfried Kirch =

German astronomer

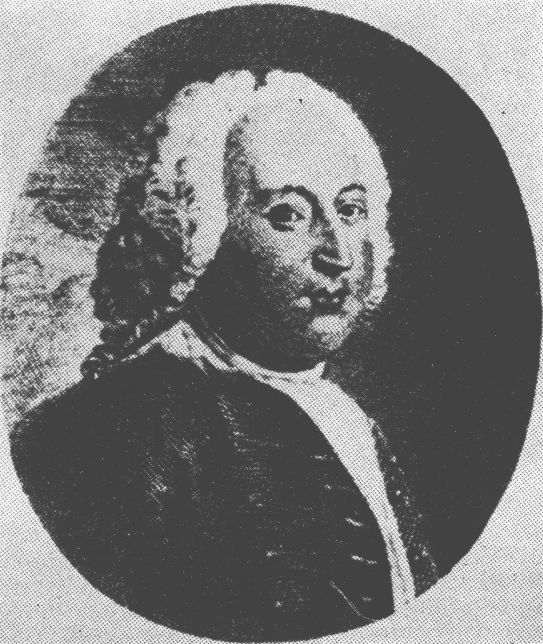
- Born: 24 December 1694; Guben, Margraviate of Brandenburg
- Died: 9 March 1740 (aged 45); Berlin, Kingdom of Prussia
- Parents: Gottfried Kirch (father); Maria Margaretha Kirch (mother)
- Relatives: Margaretha and Christine (sisters)
- Scientific career
- Fields: astronomy

Christfried Kirch (24 December 1694, Guben – 9 March 1740, Berlin) was an astronomer and almanac publisher from the Kingdom of Prussia.

== Life and work ==
He was born in Guben, Germany the son of the astronomers Gottfried Kirch and Maria Margaretha Kirch. Christfried had already participated in the solar observations of his father at the age of 12. His astronomical studies began in Leipzig and Danzig.

From 1716 until his death in 1740 he was, like his father, Direktor of the Berlin Observatory, in spite of repeated requests from the Academy of Sciences in Saint Petersburg. In 1717 he had received his father's former post at the Königlich Preußischen Sozietät der Wissenschaften. In the continuation of his father's work, especially in almanac calculation, he was aided by his mother and his younger sister .

In 1726 Kirch was made responsible for the academy's library which up until then had been the responsibility of the secretary of the academy, Johann Theodor Jablonski, and was appointed Librarian in 1735.

Christfried Kirch published many articles in several journals. He described the comet of 1718, observations of sunspots and the surface of Venus and of Jupiter, of occultation of the moons of Jupiter, of variable stars, as well as the Northern Lights and the Earth's magnetic field. In 1730 appeared his greatest work Observationes astronomicae selectiores in observatorio regio Berolinensi habitae, quibus adjectae sunt annotationes quaedam et animadversiones geographicae et chronologicae, aliaque ad astronomicam scientiam pertinentia.

He was elected a Fellow of the Royal Society in 1742.

== Literature ==
- Siegmund Günther (1882). "Kirch, Gottfried" . Allgemeine Deutsche Biographie (in German). Vol. 15. Leipzig: Duncker & Humblot. pp. 787–788. (Familienartikel)
