= Johann Wilhelm Wagner =

German astronomer (1681–1745)

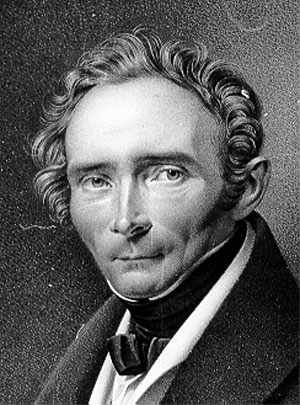
- Born: 24 November 1681; Heldburg
- Died: 16 December 1745 (aged 64); Berlin
- Scientific career
- Fields: Astronomy

Johann Wilhelm Wagner (24 November 1681 in Heldburg/Thüringen – 16 December 1745 in Berlin) was a Prussian (German) astronomer.

== Life and work ==
Between 1700 and 1703 he had a position as assistant to Georg Christoph Eimmart at his observatory in Nürnberg. In April 1704 Wagner began his studies at the University of Jena. From 1706 to 1709 he was at the private observatory of Baron Bernhard Friedrich von Krosigk (1656–1714) Berlin; in the following years followed various posts in Russia and Silesia. From 1711 till either 1712 or 1713 he was a professor at a Ritterakademie.

In 1716 Wagner became Observator and Member of the Preußischen Akademie der Wissenschaften. From 1720 he was Professor for Mathematics at the Gymnasium in Hildburghausen, until it was closed in 1727. On 16 December 1722 his son Johann Friedrich Wilhelm Wagner was born in Hildburghausen. In 1730 Wagner became Professor of Architecture at the Akademie der Künste in Berlin, and in 1735 Librarian of the Academy of Sciences. In 1740 after the death of Christfried Kirch he was named as his successor as Director of Berlin Observatory - a post which he held for the rest of his life. The almanac calculation at the Observatory am Observatorium took so much of his time that his son undertook some of his work in teaching at the Akademie der Künste. Wagner died unmarried in December 1745 from a heart attack.
