= August Nathanael Grischow =

German mathematician and astronomer

- Born: 29 September 1726; Berlin
- Died: 4 June 1760 (aged 33); Saint Petersburg
- Scientific career
- Fields: astronomy, mathematics

August Nathanael Grischow (29 September 1726 in Berlin – 4 June 1760 in Saint Petersburg) was a German mathematician and astronomer. He was the son of the mathematician and meteorologist. From 1745 until 1749 Augustin Nathanael Grischow was Director of the old Berlin Observatory. In 1749 he became a Member of the Prussian Academy of Sciences. In 1750 he became Professor of Optics at the Berlin Academy of Arts. In 1751 he gave up this post in order to become Professor of Astronomy and Member of the Russian Academy of Sciences in Saint Petersburg. There he concerned himself mainly with the theory of the parallax of celestial objects, primarily the Moon.

== Publications ==
- Methodus investigandi parallaxin lunae et planetarum.
- Observationes circa longitudinem penduli simplices institutae. 1760
