= Oswald Lohse =

German astronomer (1845-1915)

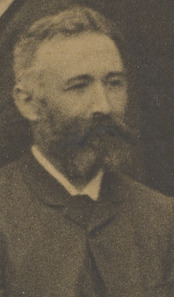
Oswald Lohse, 1887

Wilhelm Oswald Lohse (13 February 1845 – 14 May 1915) was a German astronomer. He first worked at the private Bothkamp Observatory, and starting in 1874 at the Potsdam Astrophysical Observatory, being its Chief Astronomer at the time of his death.

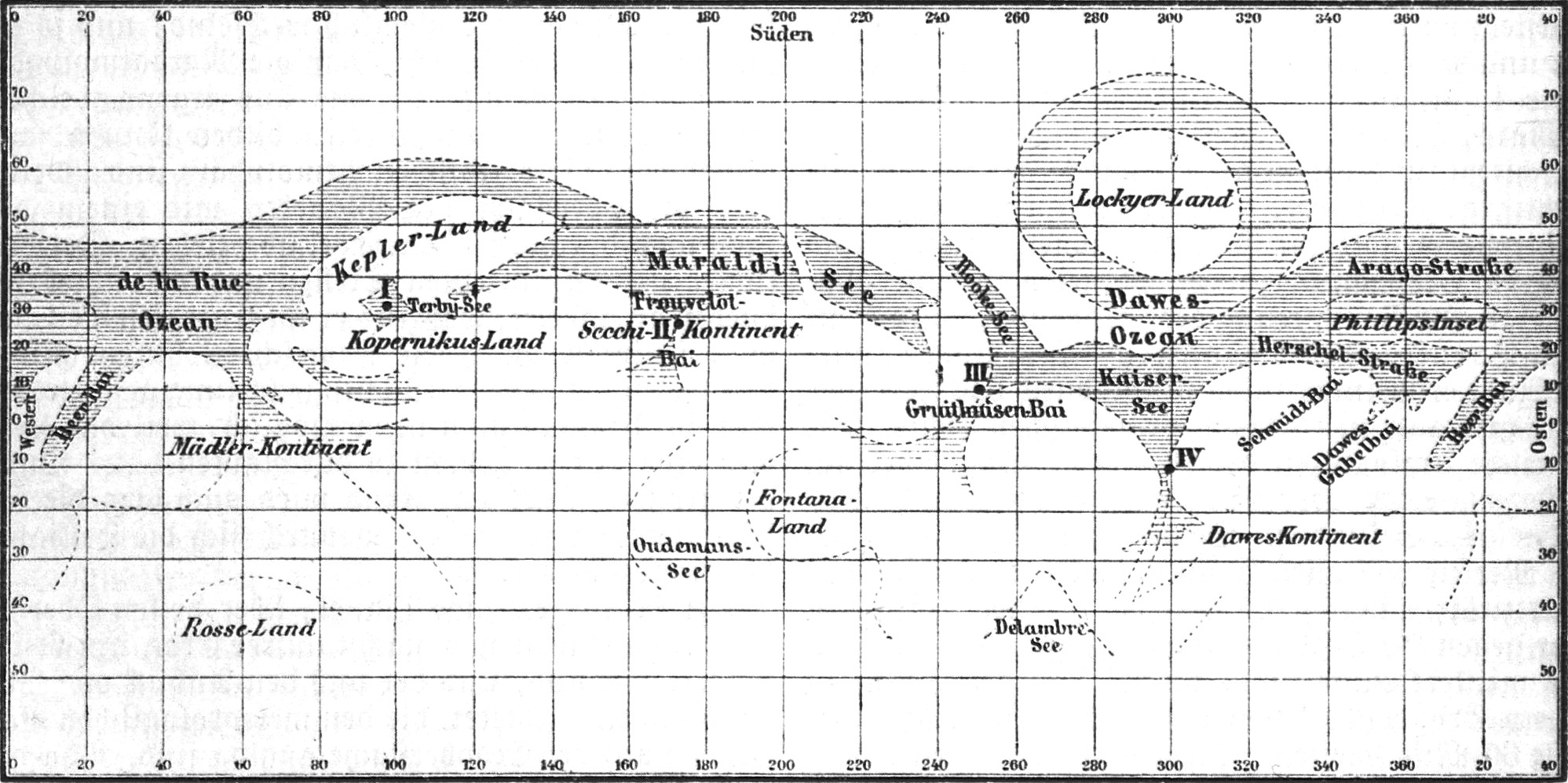
Mars map by Lohse (1890)

His main work involved the investigation of the surface features of Mars and Jupiter. After this he explored binary stars, and finally worked on the spectroscopy of stars, which included laboratory experiments regarding the spectra of metals.

Craters on Mars and on the Moon were named in his honor.
