= Johann Heinrich Hoffmann =

German astronomer

Johann Heinrich Hoffman
- Born: 1669; Kerspleben
- Died: 6 April 1716 (aged 46–47); Berlin
- Scientific career
- Fields: astronomy

Johann Heinrich Hoffmann (1669 in Thüringen; April 6, 1716 in Berlin) was a German astronomer.

== Life and work ==
Hoffmann was a student of Erhard Weigel and, until his death in 1699, his assistant. He accompanied him on his journey of 1696 to 1697 to Denmark and Sweden. From February 1701 Hoffmann was employed first as Adjunkt and later as astronomer and observator at the Königlich Preußischen Sozietät der Wissenschaften in Berlin. At the Berlin Observatory he began his duties as assistant of the first director Gottfried Kirch. After the latter's death in 1710, he succeeded him as director and continued the main task of calculating the calendar, up until his death.

Apart from his activities as director of the Berlin Observatory, from 1705 he led at the same time the private observatory of Bernhard Friedrich von Krosigk and was from 1710 until at least 1712 also a teacher to the Cadet Corps.
