= Rainer Spurzem =

German astronomer

Rainer Spurzem is a German astronomer at the Astronomisches Rechen-Institut in Heidelberg, Germany. His speciality is the N-body simulation of galaxies and star clusters.

With Sverre Aarseth, he was the first to simulate core collapse of a star cluster using a direct N-body algorithm on a Cray supercomputer.

Rainer Spurzem is a leader of the GRACE project, which uses reconfigurable hardware for astrophysical particle simulations. The GRACE project was funded via grants from the Volkswagen Foundation and from the Ministry of Science, Research and Art of Baden-Württemberg. He also designed gravitySimulator, a special-purpose computer based on GRAPE accelerator boards at the Rochester Institute of Technology.
