= Wilhelm Julius Foerster =

German astronomer (1832–1921)

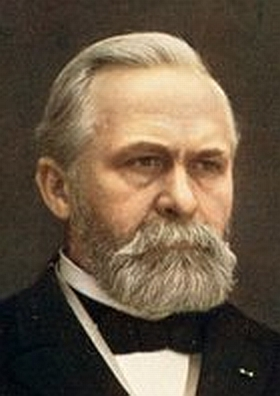
Wilhelm Julius Foerster, c. 1905

Wilhelm Julius Foerster (Note: His name can also be written as Förster, but is usually written as Foerster, even in most German sources where "ö" is otherwise used in the text.) (16 December 1832 – 18 January 1921) was a German astronomer.

== Biography ==
A native of Grünberg, Silesia, he studied at the University of Berlin and Rheinische Friedrich-Wilhelms-Universität Bonn, and worked as Johann Franz Encke's assistant. In 1860, he co-discovered asteroid 62 Erato with Oskar Lesser, the first co-discovery on record. He became professor of astronomy at the University of Berlin in 1863. After Encke's death in 1865, he became director of the Berlin Observatory and served in this position until 1904. Foerster also taught the popular geologist Alfred Wegener astronomy.

In 1868 he was appointed director of the commission established by the North German Confederation, and continued from 1871 by the German Empire, for the determination of standards of measurement. In this capacity, he superintended the reorganization of the German system of weights and measures on the metric basis. He was elected president of the International Bureau of Weights and Measures in 1891.

In 1888–89, Foerster co-founded the Urania in Berlin, an institution for astronomical education that reached out to the wider public. Foerster continued to be interested in popularizing the natural sciences.

In 1892, he assisted in the founding of the German Society for Ethical Culture (GSEC; German: Deutsche Gesellschaft für ethische Kultur), in which Albert Einstein also participated. He was also a member of the German Peace Society (German: Deutsche Friedensgesellschaft), and resisted the rise in nationalism brought about by the outbreak of World War I. While he was among the 93 German intellectuals in signing the Aufruf an die Kulturwelt manifesto in support of the war, Foerster was one of only four intellectuals to sign the Aufruf an die Europäer counter-manifesto (the others were Albert Einstein, the philosopher Otto Buek, and its author, the physiologist Georg Friedrich Nicolai).

== Legacy ==
Asteroids discovered: 1
62 Erato	September 14, 1860	MPC^{[A]}
^{A} with Oskar Lesser

The asteroid 6771 Foerster is named after him, and so is the Wilhelm-Foerster-Sternwarte (Wilhelm Foerster Observatory; IAU code 544).

== Publications ==
- Populäre Mitteilungen (2 vols., 1879 and 1884)
- Sammlung von Vorträgen und Abhandlungen (2 vols., 1887 and 1890)
- Studien zur Astrometrie (1888).
