= Gottfried Kirch =

German astronomer (1639–1710)

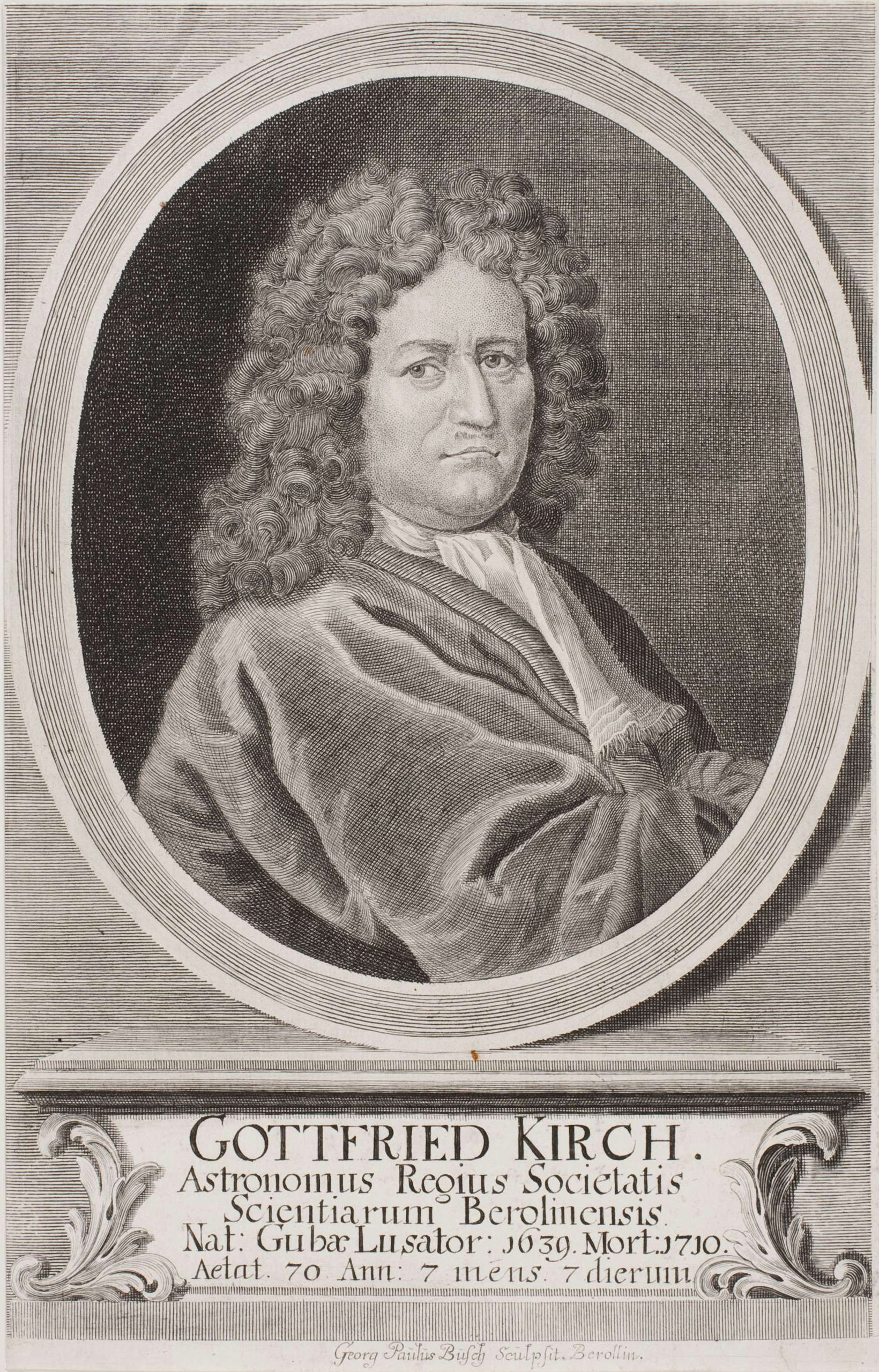
- Gottfried Kirch
- Born: 18 December 1639; Guben, Margraviate of Lower Lusatia, Holy Roman Empire
- Died: 25 July 1710 (aged 70); Berlin, Kingdom of Prussia, Holy Roman Empire
- Other name: Kirche
- Known for: First 'Astronomer Royal' in Berlin
- Spouse: Maria Margaretha Winkelmann
- Children: Christfried, Christine, Margaretha
- Scientific career
- Fields: Astronomy
- Institutions: Berlin Observatory
- Academic advisors: Erhard Weigel

Gottfried Kirch (German: [ˈkɪʁç]; also Kirche [ˈkɪʁçə], Kirkius; 18 December 1639 – 25 July 1710) was a German astronomer and the first "Astronomer Royal" in Berlin and, as such, director of the nascent Berlin Observatory.

== Life and work ==
The son of Michael Kirch, a shoemaker in Guben, initially he worked as a schoolmaster in Langgrün and Neundorf near Lobenstein. He also worked as a calendar-maker in Saxonia and Franconia. He began to learn astronomy with Erhard Weigel in Jena, and with Hevelius in Danzig. In Danzig in 1667, Kirch published calendars and built several telescopes and instruments. In 1679 he invented a screw micrometer for astronomical measurements. He became an astronomer working in Coburg, Leipzig and Guben as well from 1700 in Berlin.

In the last quarter of the 17th century, Kirch was the most-read calendar maker and counted as one of the leading Germans. In 1680 he discovered a comet with a telescope for the first time: Komet C/1680 V1, called Kirch's comet. In 1681 he discovered the Wild Duck Cluster M 11. In 1686 he went to Leipzig. Together with the farmer and astronomer Christoph Arnold he observed the comets of that year. In the same year he discovered the Mira variable χ Cygni. He also dedicated much time to observing the double star Mizar. He introduced three new constellations, the "Globus cruciger" ("Reichsapfel"), the "Electoral Sword" ("Kurfürstliches Schwert") and the Sceptre of Brandenburg, which however were not recognized and adopted by the International Astronomical Union (IAU). Via Arnold he met his second wife Maria Margaretha Winkelmann (1670–1720), who had learnt astronomy from self-study and from Arnold. While jointly observing the comet of 1702, they discovered the globular cluster M 5 (5 May 1702). In 1699, he had observed comet 55P/Tempel-Tuttle but this observation was not recognized until later analysis by Joachim Schubart.

For a long period, he was unable to find employment, so he had to earn his living through the publication of Almanacs/ Calendars. He was assisted in the calculations by his second wife and their children. A few series of almanacs appeared across several decades. For a time, he published up to 13 almanacs a year, a few appearing under pseudonyms, and he also continued established almanacs from other authors under their name. As examples could be cited Christian-, Jewish- und Turkish-Almanac, the Gipsy-Almanac the Sibylla Ptolemaein, a Gipsywoman from Alexandria in Egypten, the Astronomischen Wunder-Kalender, the Wahrhaftigen Himmels-Boten, the Gespenster- und Haushaltungs-Kalender by Johann Friedrich von Rosenfeld / Der Astronomiae Ergebener and from 1700 the various Academy Almanacs as "Astronomer Royal" in Berlin.

It is only recently that the importance of the Kirch's Almanacs has been recognized for the distribution of ideas of the Enlightenment and Pietism to the wider population. The functions of almanacs are Information, Education and Discussion. Kirch's Calendars are noted additionally for the announcement of both his own results as well as results from abroad. A few almanacs anticipate the Astronomisches Jahrbuch. Further aspects are the transmission of new ideas to ordinary people in conjunction with a growing distancing from astrological superstition and criticisms of orthodox beliefs. The accompaniment to all almanacs Zugaben / Oder Astrologisches Bedencken / von dem Lauff und der Wirckung des Gestirnten Himmels / ... (example from the Zigeuner-Kalender) had been demanded by the publishers, as otherwise the almanacs did not sell well. Astrological ideas were still not fully overcome at this time, but he attacked the practice of astrological forecasting and the mendacity of many almanac makers of his time as being a sin against God, especially prophecies regarding war and peace.

Beginning in 1675 he pursued the idea of founding an Astronomical Society in Germany. It was to be open to all astronomers independent of nationality or religious persuasion. He promoted the idea that all astronomers should send their observations to a central location where they could be published as soon as possible. He considered Frankfurt am Main to be the ideal location, for one because of the Messe (fair) and on the other hand because of its easy connection to the Netherlands via the Rivers Main and Rhine. The planned society should also serve to coordinate the observing of astronomical events such as eclipses and transits of planets. In particular he organized observations of the transit of Mercury on 31 October or 1 November 1690 in quasi-military fashion. However he appears to have made no concrete steps to set up such a society.

Then in 1700 he was appointed the first astronomer of the Royal Society of Sciences ("Kurfürstlich-Brandenburgische Societät der Wissenschaften") in Berlin on 10 May by Prince-elector Friedrich III. of Brandenburg (from 1701: King Friedrich I. of Prussia). The founding of the associated Berlin Observatory was a reaction to the new national observatories in Greenwich, Paris and St. Petersburg. To finance the academy, the Prince-Elector conferred the "Kalenderpatent" on it (a monopoly on publishing almanacs). Kirch and his wife were therefore obliged to finance the academy by their almanac calculations.

After his death, his wife continued the almanac calculations. His son Christfried Kirch became director of the Observatory in 1716. When Prussia incorporated the new province of Silesia in the 1740s, a further almanac was needed to be drawn up for the Catholics, and for that issue the academy employed his daughter Christine Kirch (1696–1782). After 1700, two calendar variants were in force in the Holy Roman Empire: the Gregorian Calendar in the catholic, the Verbesserter Reichskalender (improved Reich calendar) in the Protestant regions, however the latter differed from the former solely in respect of calculation of the date of Easter.

The crater Kirch on the Moon and the asteroid 6841 Gottfriedkirch are named after him.

Kirch studied the double star Mizar.

He died in Berlin at the age of seventy.

== Selected publications ==
- Wunderstern am Hals des Walfisches. Leipzig 1678
- Eilfertiger kurtzer Bericht an einen guten Freund von dem Neuen Cometen dieses 1682. Jahrs. 1682

Kirch also published his calendar, Philosophical Transactions, an Acta Eruditorum and Miscellanea Berolinensia.

== See also ==
- List of astronomical instrument makers

== Sources ==
- Robert Burnham Jr.: Burnham's Celestial Handbook, Volume Two, p. 762
- Messier Catalog: Online Biography of Gottfried Kirch
