= Manfred Lautenschläger-Stiftung =

German charitable foundation

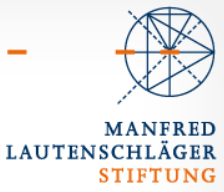
Manfred Lautenschläger-Stiftung logo

The Manfred Lautenschläger-Stiftung (Manfred Lautenschläger Foundation), founded in 2002, is a charitable foundation based in Heidelberg, Germany. The foundation supports science, research, education, art, culture, the understanding between peoples, as well as regional projects.

== Programs and awards ==
Among other activities, awards and stipends, the foundation sponsors the Lautenschläger Research Prize, with a prize money of EUR 250,000, at the University of Heidelberg.
