= Johann Theodor Jablonski =

Polish educator and lexicographer (1654–1731)

Johann Theodor Jablonsky
- Born: December 15, 1654; Danzig, Poland-Lithuania
- Died: April 28, 1731 (aged 115); Berlin, Prussia
- Occupations: Educator; lexicographer
- Known for: Lexicographical work; secretary to Prussian royalty

Johann Theodor Jablonski (15 December 1654, Danzig (Gdańsk) Poland – 28 April 1731, Berlin) was a German educator and lexicographer of Czech origin, who also wrote under the pen name Pierre Rondeau.

== Life ==
Johann Theodor Jablonski was the oldest child of Petr Figulus (a scholar and Protestant pastor from the town Jablonné nad Orlicí in northeastern Bohemia) and Alžběta (Elizabeth), the daughter of John Amos Comenius. Comenius' family has been escaping from Bohemian Crown since 1628, together with hundreds of thousands of other Protestant Czech and German Bohemians, to evade from religious persecution and forced recatholization imposed by victorious Habsburgs. Petr Figulus, who served as a secretary for his carer and subsequent father-in-law Comenius, travelled with him throughout whole Europe; finally he found asylum in Danzig. Petr and Alžběta had also four younger children, one of them was Daniel Ernst Jablonski, later religious reformer and scholar. Unlike other siblings, brothers Johann and Daniel took their surnames Jablonski (Jablonský in Czech, i.e. "man from Jablonné") from the name of father's birthplace.

In his teen years traveled from Memel (Klaipėda) – his father served there as a teacher and pastor for local Lutherans and Calvinists – to Amsterdam where was educated by his grandfather Comenius; after father's and grandfather's death (both 1670), he went to Brandenburg-Prussia where he became a student in the Joachimsthal Gymnasium in Berlin. From 1672 he studied at the Albertina in Königsberg, then in 1674 continued his education at the university in Frankfurt an der Oder.

In 1680, he undertook a trip to the Netherlands and to England, together with brother Daniel. In 1687, he became the secretary of Princess Marie Eleonore of Anhalt-Dessau, the daughter of Prince John George II, thus moved then to Poland-Lithuania where the princess married. In 1689 he returned to the Holy Roman Empire when he obtained a similar post – to become the secretary of Heinrich of Saxe-Weissenfels, Count of Barby. In 1700 he returned to Berlin as a tutor to Prussian Crown Prince Frederick William (Friedrich Wilhelm). In the same year he was named first secretary of the newly established Prussian Academy of Sciences (which was co-founded by his brother Daniel).

For the rest of his life Jablonski also held a position of Hofrat (court councillor).

== Works ==
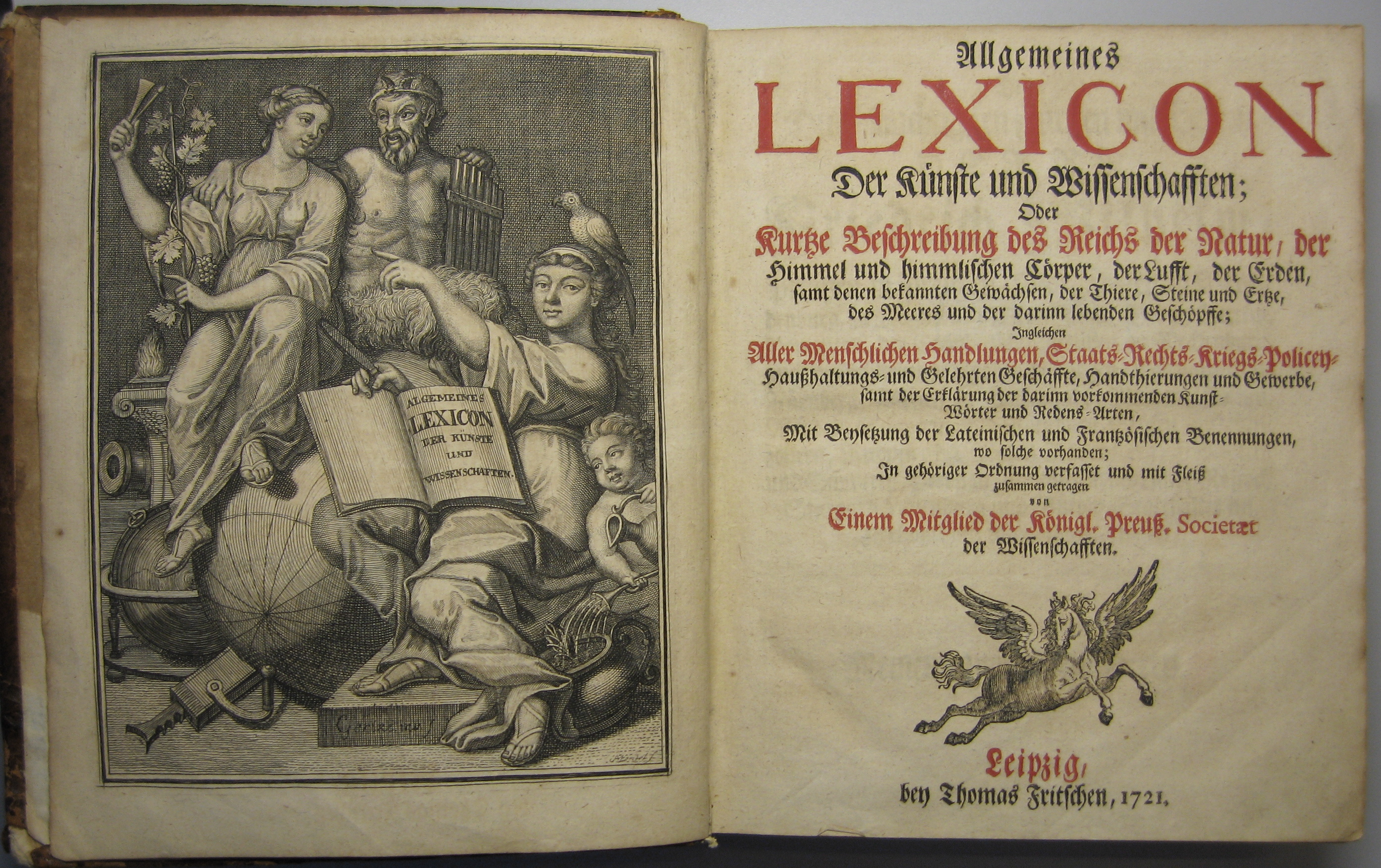
Title page of Allgemeines Lexicon der Künste und Wissenschaften (1721)

His masterpiece is the Allgemeines Lexicon der Künste und Wissenschaften ("General Dictionary of Arts and Sciences"), which appeared in 1721.

In the years 1711–12, he published, under the pen name of Pierre Rondeau, a Franco-German and German-French dictionary and a grammar of the French language. Additionally, he translated Tacitus's 'De moribus Germanorum' from Latin in 1724.
