= Stromgren =

Stromgren, Strömgren or Strømgren is a surname. Notable people with the surname include:

- Bengt Strömgren (1908–1947), Danish astronomer
- Elis Strömgren (1870–1947), Swedish-Danish astronomer
- Jo Strømgren (born 1970), Norwegian choreographer
- Tom Stromgren (born 1936), American football coach
- William Strömgren (born 2003), Swedish ice hockey player

== See also ==
- Strömgren integral
- Strömgren photometric system
- Strömgren sphere
