= Jens Olsen =

Jens Olsen may refer to:

- Jens Olsen (clockmaker) (1872-1945), Danish clockmaker
  - Jens Olsen's World Clock, astronomical clock which in Copenhagen, Denmark, named after the clockmaker
- Jens Olsen (footballer) (born 1975), Danish footballer turned manager
