= NGC 5480 =

Galaxy in the constellation Ursa Major

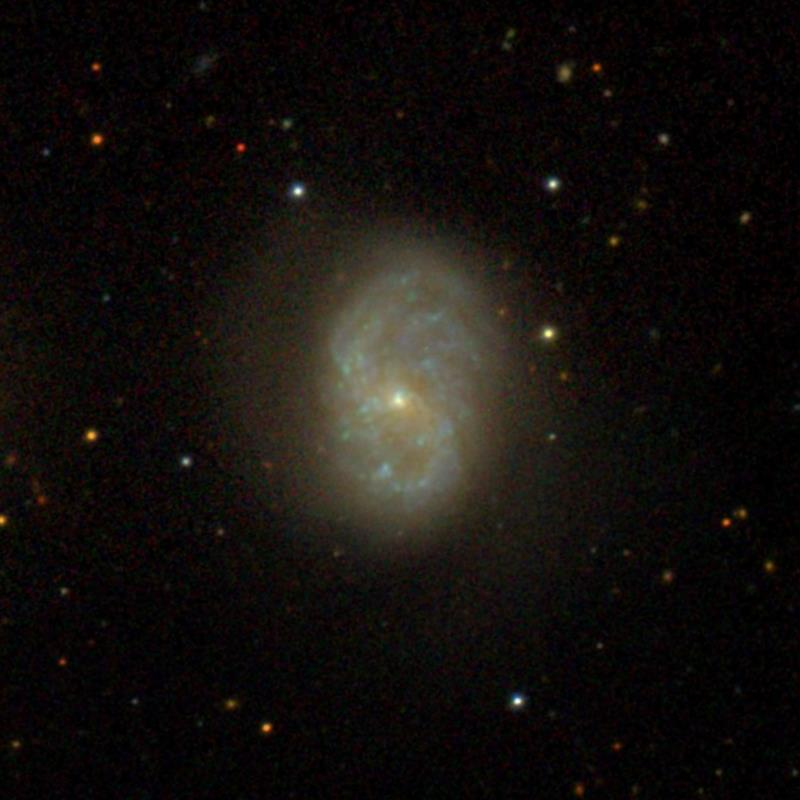
- NGC 5480 imaged by SDSS

Observation data (J2000 epoch)
- Constellation: Ursa Major
- Right ascension: 14^{h} 06^{m} 21.5880^{s}
- Declination: +50° 43′ 30.232″
- Redshift: 0.006373±0.000006
- Heliocentric radial velocity: 1,911±2 km/s
- Distance: 77.45 ± 5.01 Mly (23.747 ± 1.536 Mpc)
- Group or cluster: NGC 5448 Group (LGG 372)
- Apparent magnitude (V): 12.8g

Characteristics
- Type: SA(s)c
- Size: ~50,500 ly (15.47 kpc) (estimated)
- Apparent size (V): 1.63′ × 1.22′

Other designations
- HOLM 588A, IRAS 14045+5057, UGC 9026, MCG +09-23-035, PGC 50312, CGCG 272-027

NGC 5480 is a spiral galaxy in the constellation of Ursa Major. Its velocity with respect to the cosmic microwave background is 2,045±10 km/s, which corresponds to a Hubble distance of 98.4 ± 6.9 Mly (30.16 ± 2.12 Mpc). However, 15 non-redshift measurements give a closer mean distance of 77.45 ± 5.01 Mly (23.747 ± 1.536 Mpc). It was discovered by German-British astronomer William Herschel on 15 May 1787.

NGC 5480 is listed as having an active galactic nucleus.

== NGC 5448 group ==
According to A. M. Garcia, the galaxy NGC 5480 is a member of the NGC 5448 group (also known as LGG 372). This galaxy group has at least nine members, including NGC 5425, NGC 5448, NGC 5477, NGC 5481, NGC 5500, NGC 5520, UGC 9056, and UGC 9083.

NGC 5480 and neighboring galaxy NGC 5481 are listed together as Holm 588 in Erik Holmberg's A Study of Double and Multiple Galaxies Together with Inquiries into some General Metagalactic Problems, published in 1937.

== Supernovae ==
Two supernovae have been observed in NGC 5480:

- SN 1988L (Type Ib, mag. 16.5) was discovered by Saul Perlmutter and Carlton R. Pennypacker on 30 April 1988.
- SN 2017iro (Type Ib, mag. 15.5) was discovered by Patrick Wiggins on 30 November 2017.

== See also ==
- List of NGC objects (5001–6000)
