= NGC 1667 =

Galaxy in the constellation Eridanus

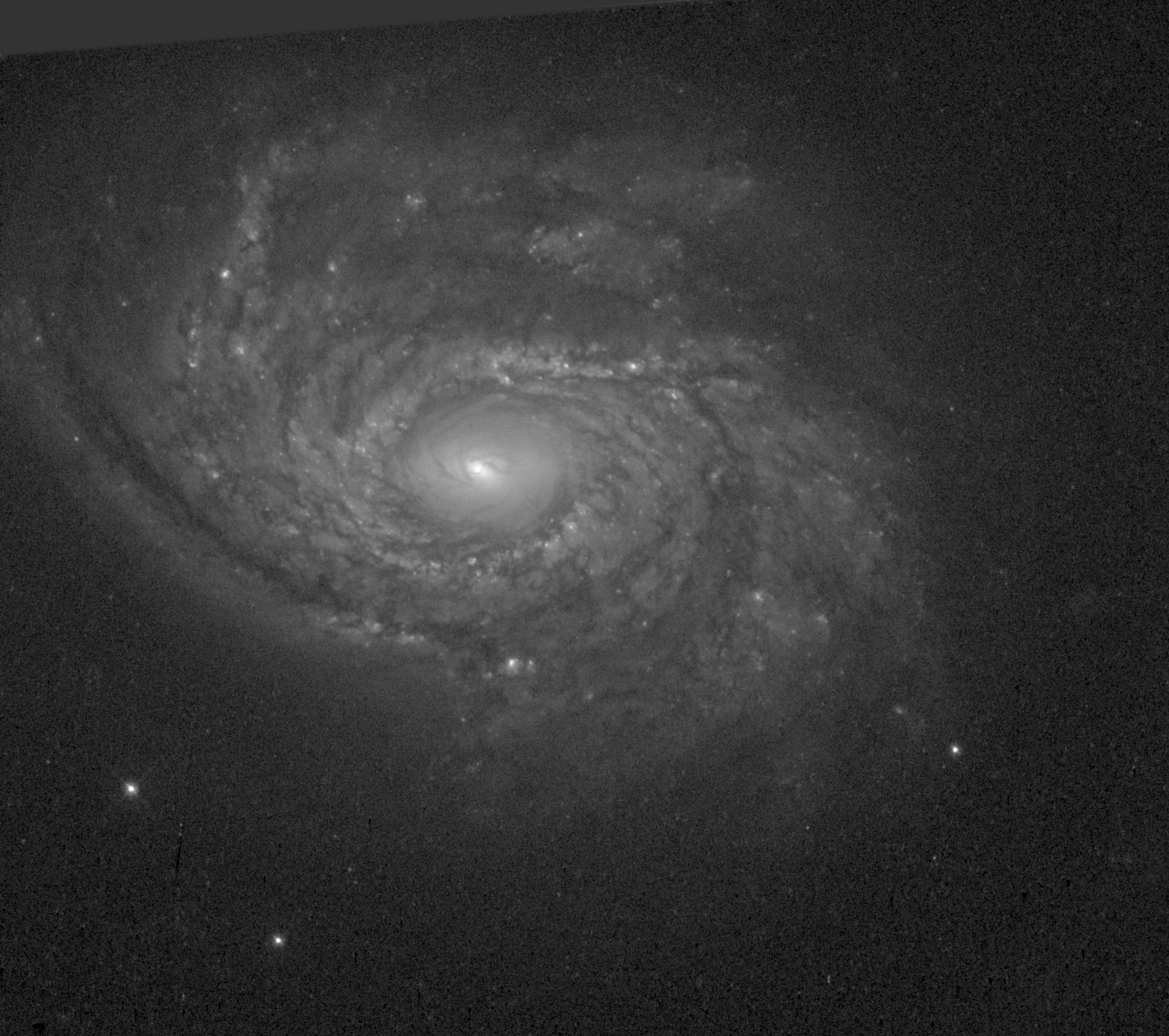
- NGC 1667 by the Hubble Space Telescope

Observation data (J2000 epoch)
- Constellation: Eridanus
- Right ascension: 04^{h} 48^{m} 37.1976^{s}
- Declination: −06° 19′ 12.108″
- Redshift: 0.015257 ± 0.000012
- Heliocentric radial velocity: 4,574 ± 4 km/s
- Distance: 148 ± 57 Mly (45.4 ± 17.4 Mpc)
- Apparent magnitude (V): 12.1

Characteristics
- Type: SAB(r)c
- Size: ~80,000 ly (24.6 kpc) (estimated)
- Apparent size (V): 1.8′ × 1.4′
- Notable features: Seyfert Galaxy

Other designations
- IRAS 04461-0624, NGC 1689, MCG -01-13-013, PGC 16062

NGC 1667, also catalogued as NGC 1689, is a spiral galaxy located in the constellation Eridanus. It is located at a distance of about 150 million light years from Earth based on redshift-independent methods, which, given its apparent dimensions, means that NGC 1667 is about 80,000 light years across. Based on its redshift, the galaxy sits roughly 200 million light years away from the Sun. It was discovered by Édouard Stephan on December 13, 1884, and independently by Lewis Swift on October 22, 1886.

== Characteristics ==
The galaxy has a small, bright nucleus with a weak bar. There is dust in the inner region of the galaxy, forming a nuclear spiral. Multiple spiral arms are visible near the nucleus, with are roughly symmetrical but the centre of symmetry is offset from the nucleus. The galaxy has an inner ring with many knots measuring 0.33 by 0.24 arcminutes. The ring is composed of many spiral fragments and young star clusters. Three spiral arms emerge from the ring. Many HII regions are visible across the arms and the inner ring. The star formation rate of the galaxy is estimated to be 6.91 M_{☉} per year.

=== Active nucleus ===
The nucleus of the galaxy has been found to be active and it has been characterised as a type 2 Seyfert galaxy based on its emission lines. The most accepted theory for the energy source of active galactic nuclei is the presence of an accretion disk around a supermassive black hole. The mass of the black hole in the centre of NGC 1667 is estimated to be 10^{7.8} (60 million) M_{☉}.

Although the nucleus emits ultraviolet, radio waves and H-alpha, it isn't a strong source when compared with the rest of the galaxy. The nucleus accounts for about 5% of the H-alpha emission of the galaxy. The nucleus is surrounded by extended HII regions, with signs of photoionization by hot OB stars, indicative of high star formation rate in central region of the galaxy. There are also large amounts of dust. The nucleus also emitted mostly soft X-rays at a low flux and with little short-term variability in 2004, but with a significant long-term drop in flux between 1977–78 and 2004.

In the centre of the galaxy there are two peaks of CO(2-1) emission, two arcseconds across. The western peak lies at the kinematic centre of the galaxy. The inner two arcseconds of the galaxy are rotating at an angle of 150° with respect to the rest of the galaxy, indicating its core is counter-rotating, probably as a result of a merger or gas inflows.

The spectrographic study of the nuclear region revealed a nuclear outflow and a gas disk which is twisted by the outflow in the inner arcsecond and gas inflowing from the spiral appear farther from the nucleus. The ionized gas mass outflow rate is estimated to be about 0.16 M_{☉} per year, while the gas inflow is about 2.8 M_{☉} per year about 800 parsec from the nucleus. However, most of the inflowing gas will probably not reach the nucleus and accumulate around it, leading to circumnuclear star formation.

== Supernova ==
One supernova has been observed in NGC 1667. SN 1986N was discovered on 11 December 1986, with an apparent magnitude of 15, by Carlton R. Pennypacker and others at the Leuschner Observatory. It was located 15" west and 7" south of the centre of the galaxy. Based on its spectrum it was categorised as a Type Ia supernova about 20 days post maximum light.

== Nearby galaxies ==
NGC 1667 is a member of the NGC 1667 Group, also known as LGG 118. Other members of the group includes the galaxies IC 387, NGC 1645, NGC 1659, MCG -1-13-12, IC 2101, and IC 2097. NGC 1667 forms a non-interacting pair with NGC 1666, which lies 15 arcminutes away.

== Gallery ==
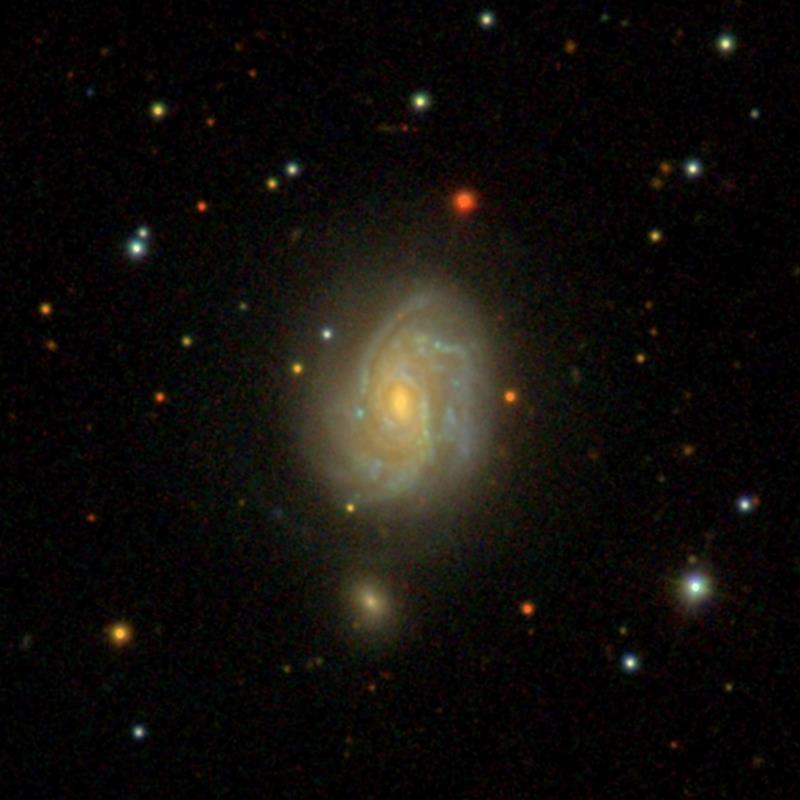
NGC 1667 by Sloan Digital Sky Survey
