= NGC 4451 =

Spiral galaxy in the constellation Virgo

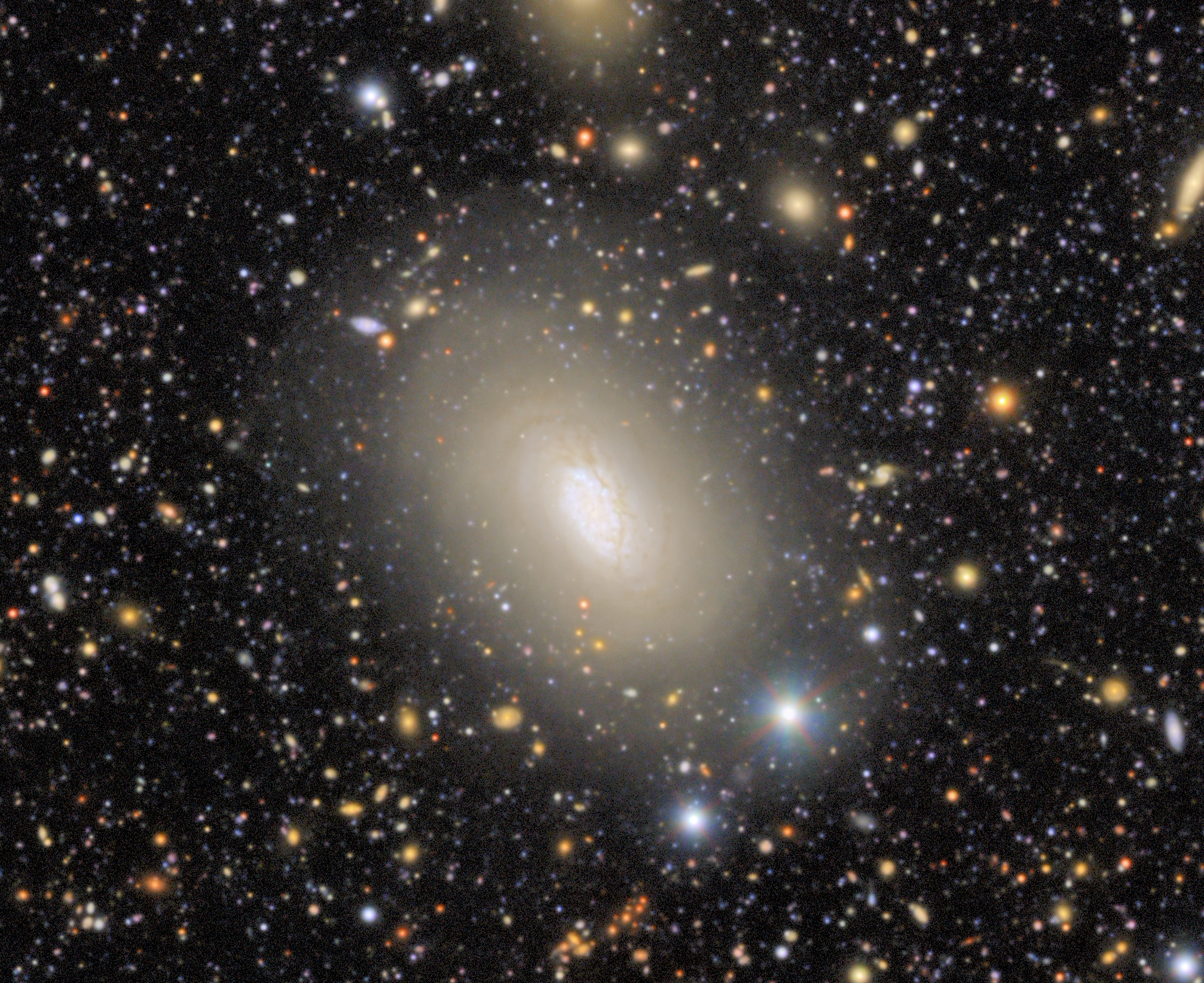
- NGC 4451 imaged by the Vera C. Rubin Observatory

Observation data (J2000 epoch)
- Constellation: Virgo
- Right ascension: 12^{h} 28^{m} 40.558^{s}
- Declination: +09° 15′ 32.13″
- Redshift: 0.002865
- Heliocentric radial velocity: 862
- Distance: 85.0 Mly (26.06 Mpc)
- Group or cluster: Virgo cluster
- Apparent magnitude (V): 13.29

Characteristics
- Type: SA(rs)cd
- Mass: 8.2+8.2 −3.1 M_{☉}
- Apparent size (V): 1.5′ × 1.0′
- Half-light radius (apparent): 11.86″

Other designations
- VCC 1118, IRAS 12260+0932, NGC 4451, UGC 7600, MCG +02-32-079, PGC 41050, CGCG 070-111

NGC 4451 is a spiral galaxy in the equatorial constellation Virgo. It was discovered at the Copenhagen Observatory on March 19, 1865, by Heinrich d'Arrest, who used an 11" refractor telescope. The galaxy is located at a distance of 85 million light years and is receding with a heliocentric radial velocity of 862 km/s. It is a member of the Virgo Cluster of galaxies.

In March 1985, Shigo Horiguchi in Japan discovered a Type II-P supernova in this galaxy. Designated SN 1985G, it was positioned 2″ west and 5″ north of the galaxy center. The progenitor was estimated to have a mass of 21.7+4.4
−0.5 M_{☉} and was 8.65+0.14
−1.34 million years old.

== See also ==
- List of NGC objects (4001–5000)
