= 1422 Strömgrenia =

Stony Florian asteroid

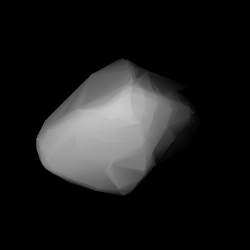
- Shape model of Strömgrenia from its lightcurve

Discovery
- Discovered by: K. Reinmuth
- Discovery site: Heidelberg Obs.
- Discovery date: 23 August 1936

Designations
- Named after: Elis Strömgren (astronomer)
- Alternative designations: 1936 QF · 1933 WB
- Minor planet category: main-belt · Flora

Orbital characteristics
- Epoch 16 February 2017 (JD 2457800.5)
- Uncertainty parameter 0
- Observation arc: 79.76 yr (29,134 days)
- Aphelion: 2.6241 AU
- Perihelion: 1.8697 AU
- Semi-major axis: 2.2469 AU
- Eccentricity: 0.1679
- Orbital period (sidereal): 3.37 yr (1,230 days)
- Mean anomaly: 291.18°
- Mean motion: 0° 17^{m} 33.36^{s} / day
- Inclination: 2.6809°
- Longitude of ascending node: 201.61°
- Argument of perihelion: 171.15°

Physical characteristics
- Dimensions: 4.64±0.66 km 4.87±0.34 km 5.62 km (calculated); 5.814±0.113 km 6.025±0.027 km
- Synodic rotation period: 3.5002±0.0102 h (S); 3.5298±0.0285 h (R)
- Geometric albedo: 0.2093±0.0364; 0.224±0.022; 0.24 (assumed); 0.320±0.045; 0.40±0.12
- Spectral type: B–V = 0.868; U–B = 0.519; Tholen = S · S
- Absolute magnitude (H): 13.051±0.003 (R) · 13.06±0.28 · 13.42

1422 Strömgrenia, provisional designation 1936 QF, is a stony Florian asteroid from the inner regions of the asteroid belt, approximately 5.5 kilometers in diameter. It was discovered on 23 August 1936, by German astronomer Karl Reinmuth at Heidelberg Observatory in southern Germany, and named after Swedish-Danish astronomer Svante Elis Strömgren.

== Classification and orbit ==
Strömgrenia is a member of the Flora family, a large group of stony asteroids in the inner main-belt. It orbits the Sun at a distance of 1.9–2.6 AU once every 3 years and 4 months (1,230 days). Its orbit has an eccentricity of 0.17 and an inclination of 3° with respect to the ecliptic. It was first identified as 1933 WB at Uccle Observatory in 1933. The body's observation arc however begins with its official discovery observation at Heidelberg in 1936.

== Lightcurves ==
Two rotational light-curves of Strömgrenia were obtained from photometric observations in the R and S band at the Palomar Transient Factory in April 2009. Light-curve analysis gave a rotation period of 3.5002 and 3.5298 hours with a brightness variation of 0.24 and 0.29 magnitude, respectively (U=2/2).

== Diameter, albedo and spectral type ==
On the Tholen taxonomy, Strömgrenia's spectral class is that of a S-type. According to the survey carried out by NASA's Wide-field Infrared Survey Explorer with its subsequent NEOWISE mission, it measures between 4.64 and 6.03 kilometers in diameter, and its surface has an albedo between 0.209 and 0.40. The Collaborative Asteroid Lightcurve Link, assumes an albedo of 0.24 – derived from the asteroid 8 Flora, the family's principal body and namesake – and calculates a diameter of 5.62 kilometers with an absolute magnitude of 13.42.

== Naming ==
This minor planet was named in honor of Swedish-Danish astronomer Svante Elis Strömgren (1870–1947), professor of astronomy and director of the Copenhagen University Observatory. Naming citation was first mentioned in The Names of the Minor Planets by Paul Herget in 1955 (H 128).
