= The INT Photometric H-Alpha Survey =

Survey of Hα emission in the northern galactic plane

- Alternative names: IPHAS
- Website: www.iphas.org

The INT Photometric H-Alpha Survey (IPHAS) is an astronomical survey of the northern plane of our Galaxy, the Milky Way, as visible from the Isaac Newton Telescope (INT) in the Canary Islands, Spain. The survey uses two broad-band filters and a narrow H-alpha filter to obtain deep images of nebulae in our Galaxy and for identifying rare types of stars. Observations for the survey began in 2003 and are almost complete. The survey is being complemented by a sister survey of the southern Galactic Plane, VPHAS+. Once these two surveys are completed the data are expected to provide a significant leap in our knowledge of the extreme phases of stellar evolution.

The goals of the survey include:

- Identification of rare objects that are often characterized by strong emission in H-Alpha compared to that in broad-band filters. This includes massive OB stars, supergiants, interacting binary stars and supernova progenitors.
- Mapping Galactic extinction and nebulosity.
- Identifying compact and extended planetary nebulae and symbiotic stars.
- Cataloging of vast numbers of stars in our Galaxy.

Because of the selection for young stars and nebulae, the survey will also increase the number of known OB associations, and other clusters.

== Discoveries ==
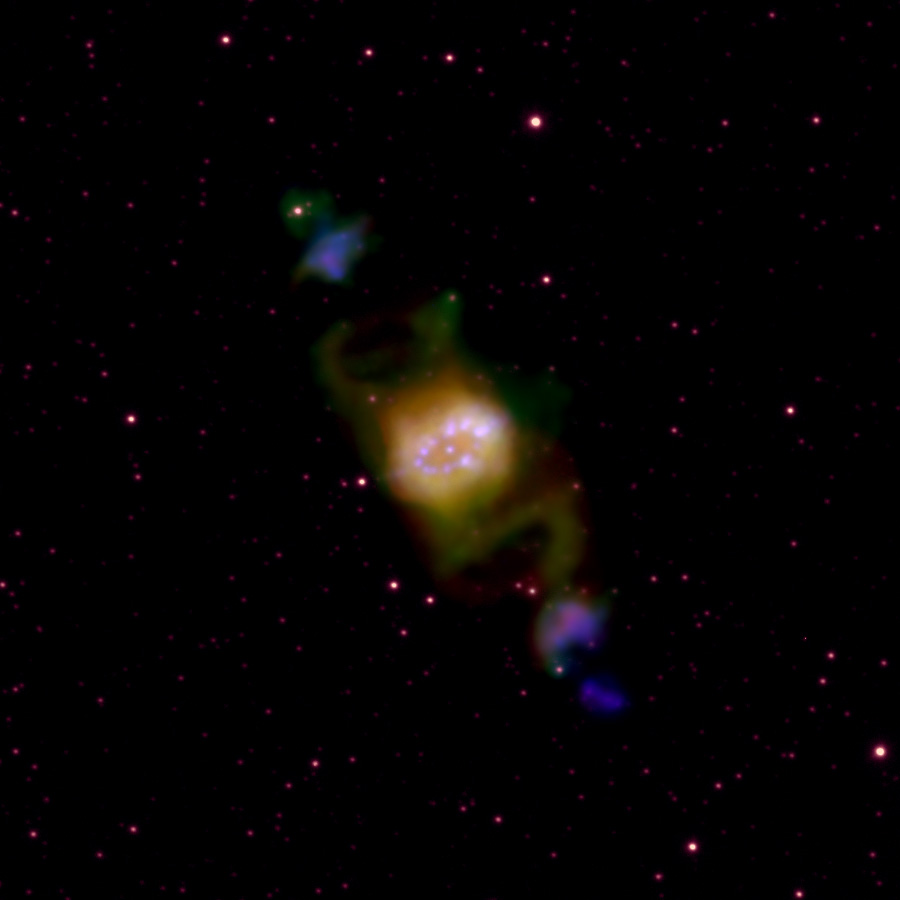
Newly discovered planetary nebula

The survey has already discovered a large number of previously unknown planetary nebulae, such as the Necklace Nebula in this image.
