= NGC 5448 =

Galaxy in the constellation Ursa Major

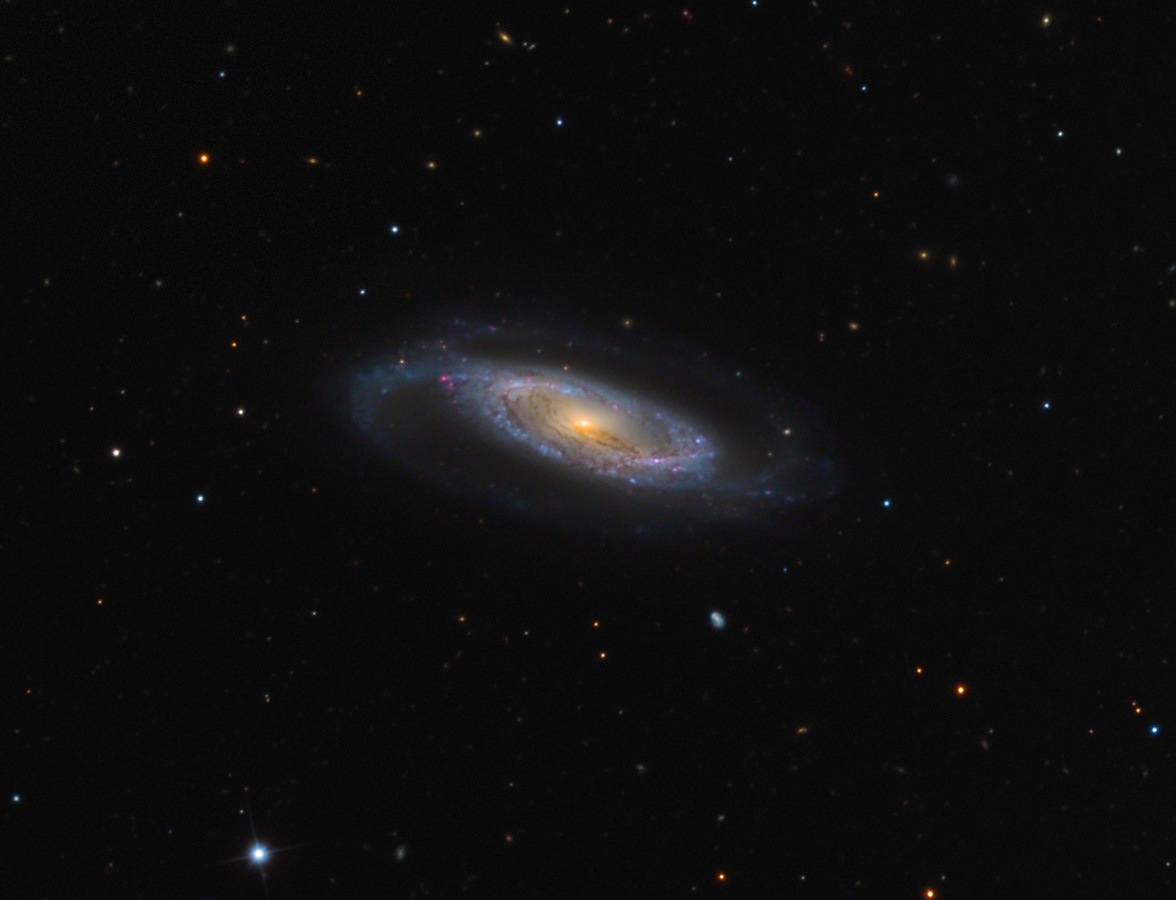
- NGC 5448 imaged by the 32-inch Schulman Telescope at Mount Lemmon Observatory

Observation data (J2000 epoch)
- Constellation: Ursa Major
- Right ascension: 14^{h} 02^{m} 50.0608^{s}
- Declination: +49° 10′ 21.402″
- Redshift: 0.006725 ± 0.000005
- Heliocentric radial velocity: 2,016 ± 1 km/s
- Distance: 95.6 ± 28.2 Mly (29.3 ± 8.6 Mpc)
- Group or cluster: NGC 5448 Group
- Apparent magnitude (V): 11.2

Characteristics
- Type: (R)SAB(r)a
- Size: ~120,000 ly (36.7 kpc) (estimated)
- Apparent size (V): 3.8′ × 2.0′
- Notable features: LINER

Other designations
- IRAS 14009+4924, UGC 8969, MCG +08-26-003, PGC 50031, CGCG 247-004

NGC 5448 is a spiral galaxy in the constellation Ursa Major. The galaxy lies about 95 million light years away from Earth based on redshift-independent methods, which means, given its apparent dimensions, that NGC 5448 is approximately 120,000 light years across. It was discovered by William Herschel on May 15, 1787.

== Characteristics ==
The galaxy has an elliptical bulge with boxy outer isophotes and an X-shape. A low-surface-brightness bar is seen running diagonally in the bulge. Stellar kinematics indicate that there is a small stellar disk in the inner 7 arcseconds of the galaxy, which is inclined by about 13 degrees with the respect to the rest of the galaxy. The stellar population in the centre of the galaxy is younger than that of the rest of the surrounding area. In images by Hubble Space Telescope a prominent dust lane is visible in the circumnuclear region of the galaxy and three more diffuse a bit further away.

Spiral arms emerge from the ends of the bar and wrap around forming a nearly complete ring. The arms are initially broad and high-contrast but after 45° degrees of revolution become narrow, while after completing a quarter of a revolution they start to branch. The galaxy has faint outer arms. Many HII regions are visible in the inner arms, while knots are also visible in the outer arms. Many dust lanes are visible across the disk.

The nucleus of the galaxy has been found to be active and based on its emission lines has been identified as a type 2 LINER. The most accepted theory for the energy source of active galactic nuclei is the presence of an accretion disk around a supermassive black hole. The mass of the black hole in the centre of NGC 5448 is estimated to be 10^{7.3} (20 million) M_{☉} based on the absolute bulge magnitude.

The galaxy is seen at high inclination viewed at an angle of 64°.

== Nearby galaxies ==
NGC 5448 is the foremost member of the NGC 5448 Group, also known as LGG 372. Other members of the group include NGC 5425, NGC 5480, NGC 5481, NGC 5520, NGC 5377, and NGC 5500.

== Gallery ==
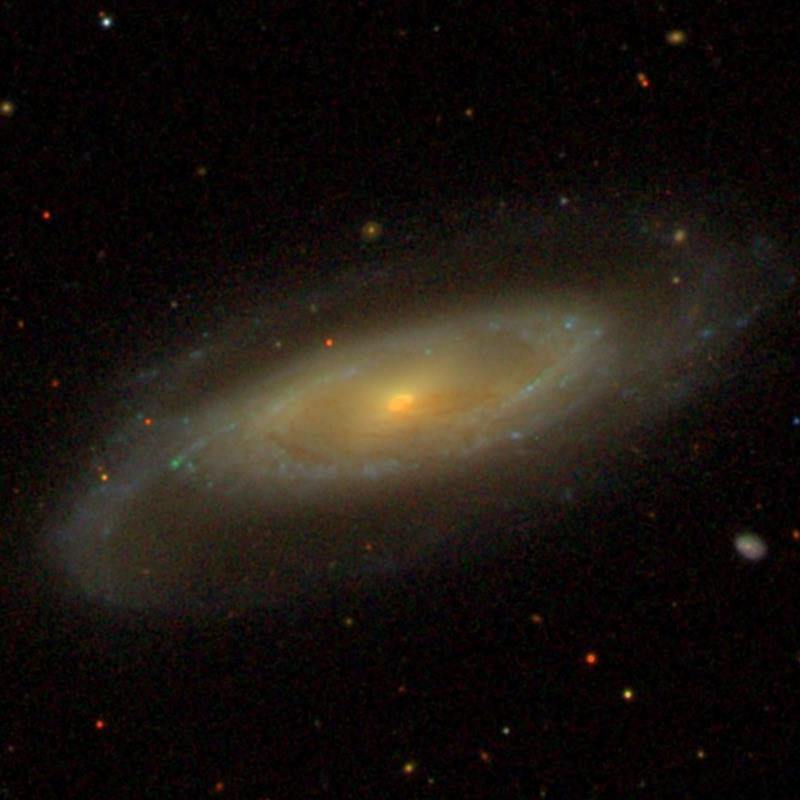
NGC 5448 imaged by Sloan Digital Sky Survey
