= CBET =

CBET may refer to:

- CBET-DT, a CBC Television owned-and-operated station located in Windsor, Ontario
- Canada Bangladesh Education Trust
- Center for Bioscience Education & Technology of the Rochester Institute of Technology
- Central Bio Equipment Trading Company Limited (CBET), based in Myanmar
- Central Bureau Electronic Telegram, a circular issued by the IAU's Central Bureau for Astronomical Telegrams (CBAT)
- Certified Biomedical Equipment Technician
- Chemical, Bioengineering, Environmental, and Transport systems, a division of the National Science Foundation's Directorate for Engineering
- Community-Based English Tutoring program of California
- Competency-Based Education and Training
- Conrad Business, Entrepreneurship and Technology centre of the University of Waterloo
