= NGC 5377 =

Intermediate barred spiral galaxy in the constellation Canes Venatici

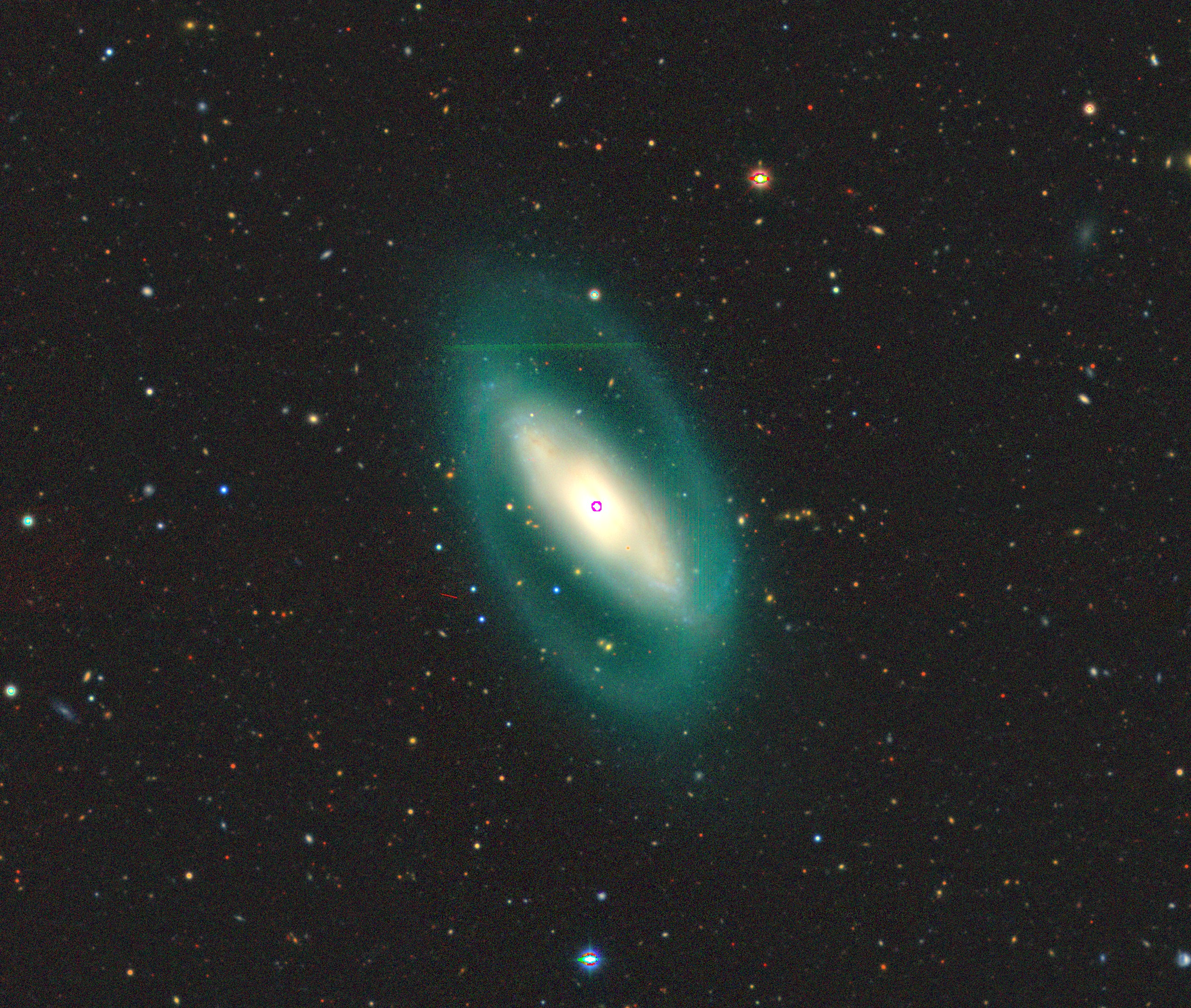
- NGC 5377 imaged by Legacy Surveys

Observation data (J2000 epoch)
- Constellation: Canes Venatici
- Right ascension: 13^{h} 56^{m} 16.6678^{s}
- Declination: +47° 14′ 08.461″
- Redshift: 0.005991±0.00000900
- Heliocentric radial velocity: 1,796±3 km/s
- Distance: 84.53 ± 4.56 Mly (25.918 ± 1.399 Mpc)
- Apparent magnitude (V): 11.46
- Apparent magnitude (B): 12.39
- Surface brightness: 23.29 mag/arcsec^2

Characteristics
- Type: (R)SB(s)a
- Size: ~110,700 ly (33.93 kpc) (estimated)
- Apparent size (V): 4.7′ × 2.4′

Other designations
- IRAS 13542+4729, UGC 8863, MCG +08-25-052, PGC 49563, CGCG 246-027

NGC 5377 is an intermediate barred spiral galaxy located in the constellation Canes Venatici. Its speed relative to the cosmic microwave background is 1,951 ± 11 km/s, which corresponds to a Hubble distance of 28.8 ± 2.0 Mpc (~93.9 million ly). NGC 5377 was discovered by German-British astronomer William Herschel on 12 May 1787.

NGC 5377 was used by Gérard de Vaucouleurs as a morphological type galaxy SAb in his galaxy atlas.

The luminosity class of NGC 5377 is I and it has a broad HI line. NGC 5377 also has an active galactic nucleus which has been identified as a type 2 LINER.

To date, 17 non-redshift measurements yield a distance of 25.918 ± 5.770 Mpc (~84.5 million ly), which is within the Hubble distance range. Note, however, that it is with the average value of independent measurements, when they exist, that the NASA/IPAC database calculates the diameter of a galaxy and that consequently the diameter of NGC 5377 could be approximately 37.7 kpc (~123,000 ly) if Hubble distance is used to calculate it.

== Nucleic disk ==
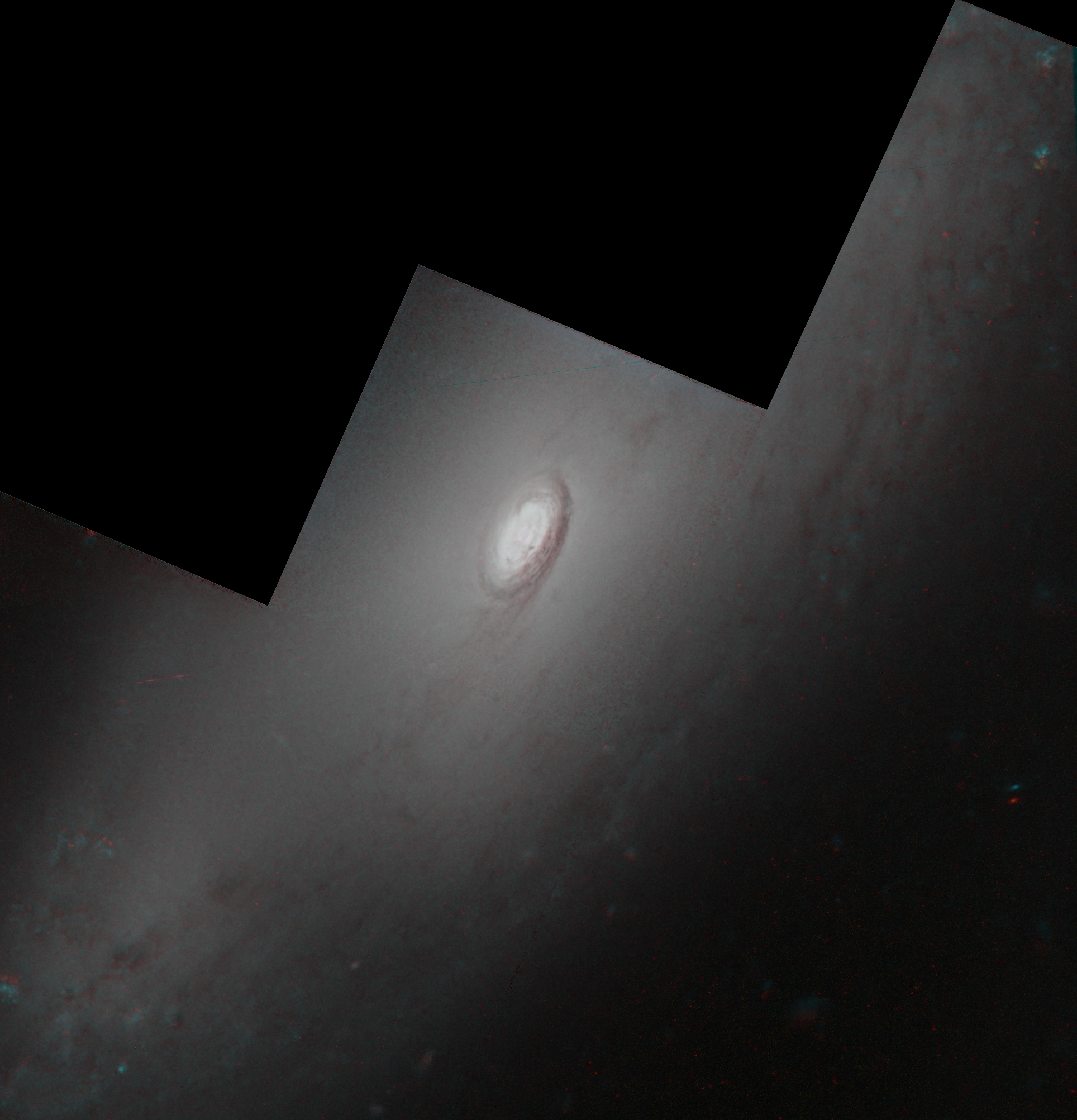
NGC 5377 imaged by the Hubble Space Telescope

With observations from the Hubble Space Telescope, a star-forming disk was observed around the core of NGC 5377. The size of its semi-major axis is estimated at 790 pc (~2,575 light years).

== Supermassive black hole ==
According to a study based on near-infrared K-band luminosity measurements of the nuclei of NGC 5377, a supermassive black hole with an apparent mass of approximately 10^{7.8} M_{☉} (63 million solar masses) exists within the core of the galaxy.

== Supernova ==
One supernova has been observed in NGC 5377. SN 1992H (Type II, mag. 15) was discovered on 11 February 1992, by William R. Wren of the McDonald Observatory at the University of Texas at Austin.

== NGC 5448 group ==
According to A. M. Garcia, NGC 5377 is a member of the NGC 5448 Group. The group has nine galaxies, including NGC 5425, NGC 5448, NGC 5481, NGC 5500, NGC 5520, UGC 9056 and UGC 9083.

== See also ==
- List of NGC objects (5001–6000)
