= 1493 Sigrid =

Dark asteroid

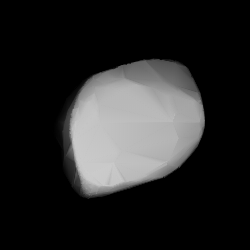
- Shape of Sigrid modelled from its lightcurve

Discovery
- Discovered by: E. Delporte
- Discovery site: Uccle Obs.
- Discovery date: 26 August 1938

Designations
- Named after: Sigrid Strömgren (wife of astronomer); Bengt Strömgren
- Alternative designations: 1938 QB · 1934 NB_{1} 1934 PW · 1957 UT; 1961 TM_{1} · 1961 XL; 1977 UN · A908 WA; A916 YD
- Minor planet category: main-belt · (inner); Nysa–Polana complex

Orbital characteristics
- Epoch 4 September 2017 (JD 2458000.5)
- Uncertainty parameter 0
- Observation arc: 108.52 yr (39,636 days)
- Aphelion: 2.9175 AU
- Perihelion: 1.9416 AU
- Semi-major axis: 2.4295 AU
- Eccentricity: 0.2009
- Orbital period (sidereal): 3.79 yr (1,383 days)
- Mean anomaly: 318.09°
- Mean motion: 0° 15^{m} 37.08^{s} / day
- Inclination: 2.5772°
- Longitude of ascending node: 330.58°
- Argument of perihelion: 1.6890°

Physical characteristics
- Dimensions: 22.111±0.200 km 22.93±6.77 km 23±2 km 23.76±3.46 km 24.03±2.1 km 24.92±8.61 km 25.10±0.42 km 27.8±5.6 km 28.905±0.401 km
- Synodic rotation period: 22.68±0.02 h 43.179±0.005 h 43.1795±0.0001 h 43.296±0.048 h
- Geometric albedo: 0.034±0.007; 0.036±0.067; 0.0398±0.0028; 0.04±0.02; 0.04±0.03; 0.048±0.002; 0.0489±0.010; 0.05±0.01
- Spectral type: Tholen = F SMASS = Xc · P B–V = 0.643; U–B = 0.225
- Absolute magnitude (H): 11.99 · 12.24 · 12.35±0.23

1493 Sigrid, provisional designation 1938 QB, is a dark asteroid from the inner regions of the asteroid belt, approximately 24 kilometers in diameter. It was discovered on 26 August 1938, by Belgian astronomer Eugène Delporte at the Royal Observatory of Belgium in Uccle. It was named after Sigrid Strömgren, wife of astronomer Bengt Strömgren.

== Orbit and classification ==
Sigrid is a member of the Nysa–Polana complex, a collection of overlapping asteroid families in the inner main belt near the Kirkwood gap at the 3:1 orbital resonance with Jupiter.

It orbits the Sun in the inner main-belt at a distance of 1.9–2.9 AU once every 3 years and 9 months (1,383 days). Its orbit has an eccentricity of 0.20 and an inclination of 3° with respect to the ecliptic. The asteroid was first identified as A908 WA at Heidelberg Observatory in November 1908. The body's observation arc begins with its official discovery observation at Uccle in August 1938.

== Physical characteristics ==
=== Spectral type ===
In the Tholen classification, Sigrid is an F-type asteroid (which agrees with the overall spectral type of the Polanian subgroup). In the SMASS classification, it is a Xc-subtype, which transitions between the X- and C-type asteroids. It has also been characterized as a primitive P-type asteroid by the Wide-field Infrared Survey Explorer (WISE).

=== Photometry ===
==== Rotation period an amplitude ====
In August 2006, a rotational lightcurve of Sigrid was obtained from photometric observations at the Mount Tarana and Cecil Observatory in NSW, Australia. Lightcurve analysis gave a rotation period of 43.296 hours with a brightness variation of 0.6 magnitude (U=2). In October 2010, Raymond Poncy found a period of 22.68 hours (or half the previous period solution) and an amplitude of 0.38 magnitude (U=2-). While not being a slow rotator, the body's period is significantly longer than the typical 2 to 20 hours seen among the majority of asteroids.

==== Spin axis ====
The asteroids lightcurve has also been modeled, using photometric data from the Lowell Photometric Database (LPD) and other sources. Modelling gave a concurring period of 43.179 and 43.1795 hours, as well as two spin axis of (183.0°, 69°) and (350.0°, 69°) in ecliptic coordinates (λ, β).

=== Diameter and albedo ===
According to the surveys carried out by the Infrared Astronomical Satellite IRAS, the Japanese Akari satellite and the NEOWISE mission of NASA's WISE telescope, Sigrid measures between 22.111 and 28.905 kilometers in diameter and its surface has a low albedo between 0.034 and 0.05.

The Collaborative Asteroid Lightcurve Link adopts the results obtained by IRAS, that is an albedo of 0.0489 and a diameter of 24.03 kilometers based on an absolute magnitude of 11.99.

== Naming ==
This minor planet was named after Sigrid Strömgren, wife of the Danish-American astronomer Bengt Strömgren, after whom the asteroid 1846 Bengt was named. The official naming citation was mentioned in The Names of the Minor Planets by Paul Herget in 1955 (H 134; RI 2297).
