= NGC 2227 =

Galaxy in the constellation Canis Major

- NGC 2227 imaged by Legacy Surveys

Observation data (J2000 epoch)
- Constellation: Canis Major
- Right ascension: 06^{h} 25^{m} 57.973^{s}
- Declination: −22° 00′ 17.41″
- Redshift: 0.007636
- Heliocentric radial velocity: 2280.6 km/s
- Distance: 98.04 ± 0.65 Mly (30.06 ± 0.20 Mpc)
- Apparent magnitude (V): 12.15
- Apparent magnitude (B): 12.86

Characteristics
- Type: SB(rs)c

Other designations
- MCG -04-16-004, PGC 19030

NGC 2227 is a barred spiral galaxy with a morphological type of SB(rs)c located in the constellation Canis Major. It was discovered on January 27, 1835, by John Herschel.

One supernova has been observed in NGC 2227: SN 1986O (Type Ia, mag. 14) was discovered by Carlton Pennypacker et al. on 24 December 1986.

== See also ==
- Extragalactic astronomy
- List of galaxies
- New General Catalogue
