= NGC 3294 =

Galaxy in the constellation Leo Minor

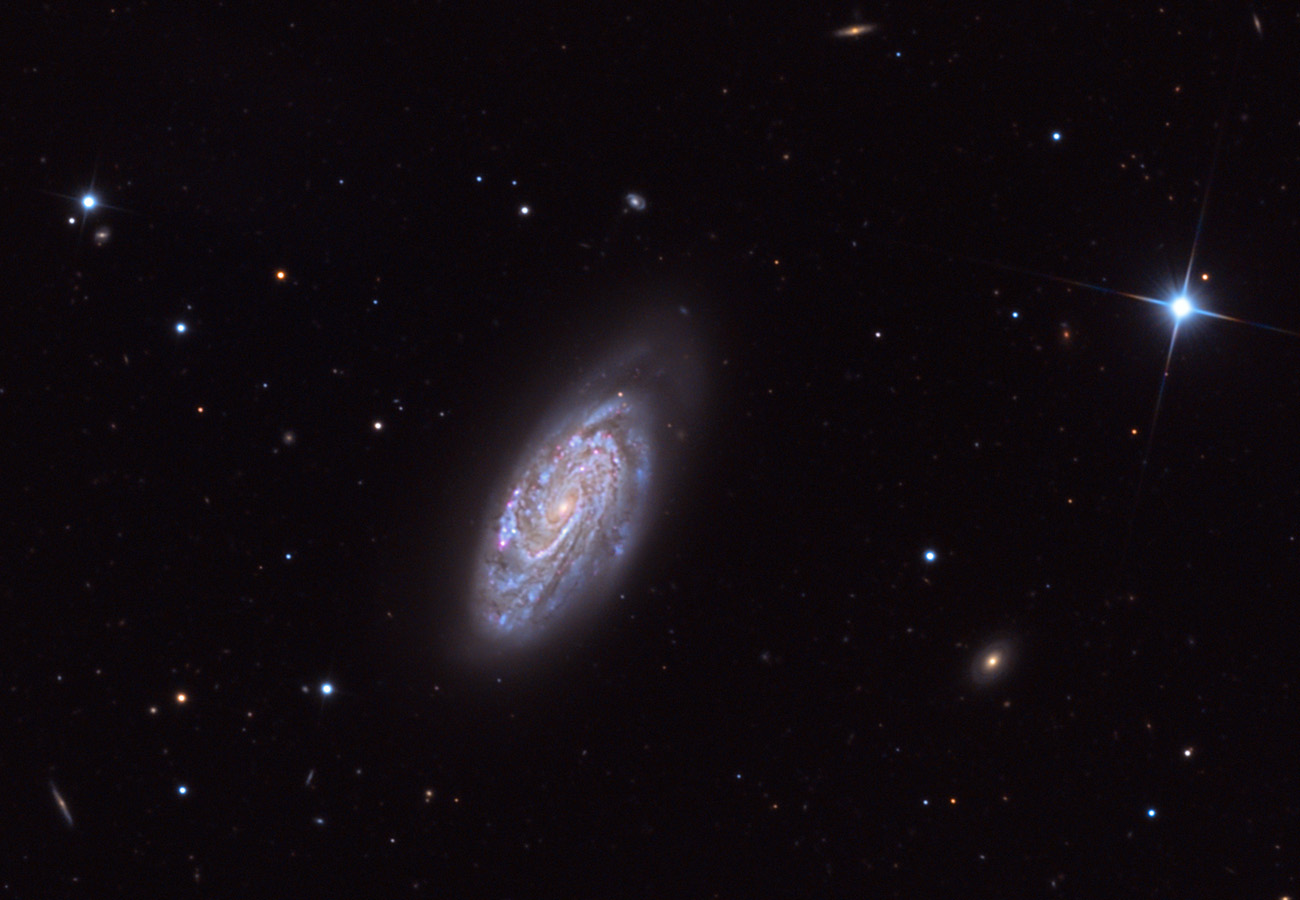
- NGC 3294 by the Mount Lemmon SkyCenter

Observation data (J2000 epoch)
- Constellation: Leo Minor
- Right ascension: 10^{h} 36^{m} 16.255^{s}
- Declination: +37° 19′ 29.02″
- Redshift: 0.00523±0.00001
- Heliocentric radial velocity: 1,586 km/s
- Distance: 98.0 Mly (30.1 Mpc)
- Apparent magnitude (V): 11.2
- Apparent magnitude (B): 11.5

Characteristics
- Type: SA(rs)bc
- Apparent size (V): 2.223′ × 0.978′

Other designations
- NGC 3294, LEDA 31428, MCG +06-23-021

NGC 3294 is a spiral galaxy in the constellation Leo Minor. It was discovered by William Herschel on Mar 17, 1787. It is a member of the Leo II Groups, a series of galaxies and galaxy clusters strung out from the right edge of the Virgo Supercluster. The galaxy is located at a distance of 98 million light years and is receding with a heliocentric radial velocity of 1,586 km/s. The morphological class of NGC 3294 is SA(rs)bc, which means this is a spiral galaxy with no central bar (SA), an incomplete inner ring structure (rs), and moderately wound spiral arms (bc).

This galaxy has been host to a pair of supernova events:

- SN 1990H was discovered by Saul Perlmutter and Carlton Pennypacker on April 9, 1990 at a position 12″ west and 1″ south of the galactic nucleus. The spectrum and light curve resembled a Type II core-collapse supernova similar to SN 1987A.
- SN 1992G was discovered by Shunji Sasaki on 14 February 14, 1992, 27″ east and 10.5″ south of the galaxy's nucleus. This was determined to be a Type Ia supernova.
