= 1846 Bengt =

Dark main-belt asteroid

Discovery
- Discovered by: C. J. van Houten; I. van Houten-G. T. Gehrels
- Discovery site: Palomar Obs.
- Discovery date: 24 September 1960

Designations
- Named after: Bengt Strömgren (Danish astronomer)
- Alternative designations: 6553 P-L · 1951 CW_{1} 1957 YP
- Minor planet category: main-belt · (inner)

Orbital characteristics
- Epoch 4 September 2017 (JD 2458000.5)
- Uncertainty parameter 0
- Observation arc: 58.66 yr (21,424 days)
- Aphelion: 2.6708 AU
- Perihelion: 2.0063 AU
- Semi-major axis: 2.3386 AU
- Eccentricity: 0.1421
- Orbital period (sidereal): 3.58 yr (1,306 days)
- Mean anomaly: 256.07°
- Mean motion: 0° 16^{m} 32.16^{s} / day
- Inclination: 3.1843°
- Longitude of ascending node: 19.092°
- Argument of perihelion: 75.087°

Physical characteristics
- Dimensions: 10.998±0.080 km
- Geometric albedo: 0.047±0.005
- Absolute magnitude (H): 13.8

1846 Bengt, provisional designation 6553 P-L, is a dark asteroid from the inner regions of the asteroid belt, approximately 11 kilometers in diameter. Discovered by the Palomar–Leiden survey in 1960, it was named for Danish astronomer Bengt Strömgren.

== Discovery ==
Bengt was discovered on 24 September 1960, by Dutch astronomer couple Ingrid and Cornelis van Houten in collaboration with Tom Gehrels, who took the photographic plates at Palomar Observatory in California.

The survey designation "P-L" stands for Palomar–Leiden, named after Palomar Observatory and Leiden Observatory, which collaborated on the fruitful Palomar–Leiden survey in the 1960s. Gehrels used Palomar's Samuel Oschin telescope (also known as the 48-inch Schmidt Telescope), and shipped the photographic plates to Ingrid and Cornelis van Houten at Leiden Observatory where astrometry was carried out. The trio are credited with several thousand asteroid discoveries.

The asteroid was first identified as 1951 CW_{1} at McDonald Observatory in 1951. The observation arc starts 3 years prior to its official discovery observation, with its first used identification 1957 YP made at Goethe Link Observatory in 1957.

== Orbit and classification ==
Bengt orbits the Sun in the inner main-belt at a distance of 2.0–2.7 AU once every 3 years and 7 months (1,306 days). Its orbit has an eccentricity of 0.14 and an inclination of 3° with respect to the ecliptic.

== Physical characteristics ==
Based on preliminary results by NASA's Wide-field Infrared Survey Explorer with its subsequent NEOWISE mission, Bengt measures 10.998 kilometers in diameter and its surface has an albedo of 0.047, which is typical for carbonaceous C-type asteroids. As of 2017, no rotational lightcurve has been obtained.

== Naming ==
This minor planet was named after renowned Danish astronomer Bengt Strömgren (1908–1987), on the occasion of his 70th birthday. He was an authority in the field of stellar structure and stellar evolution, director of the Yerkes Observatory from 1951 to 1957, and president of the International Astronomical Union (1970–1973). The official naming citation was published by the Minor Planet Center on 1 November 1978 (M.P.C. 4547).
