= Jens Olsen (clockmaker) =

Danish clockmaker (1872–1945)

Jens Olsen (27 July 1872 – 17 November 1945) was a Danish clockmaker, locksmith and astromechanic who built the world clock located in the Copenhagen City Hall.

== Life ==
Olsen was born in Ribe, Denmark. Ever since he was a small child, Olsen was interested in clocks and other mechanical devices. After hearing of the broken clock in Carsten Hauch's A Polish Family, he dreamed of fixing that clock. Later, he envisioned a clock that would show every conceivable type of time, from sidereal time to the rotation of the planets.

Olsen's father was a weaver but apprenticed Olsen to a locksmith. However, he remained interested in clocks and read as much as he could about them and later astronomy. Even after ending his apprenticeship and becoming a locksmith Olsen continued to pursue these interests.

In 1897, Olsen became a journeyman and eventually ended up in Strasbourg where he saw the famous clock built by Jean-Baptiste Schwilgué in the cathedral. He would hide in a corner near the clock, so that he could see and examine it past the viewing hours.

After Strasbourg, Olsen moved to Switzerland where he switched to clockmaking entirely. After eighteen months in Paris and a five months stay in London, he returned to Denmark to work as a superintendent at Cornelius Knudsen's establishment. At the same time he had his own business as a clockmaker. In 1905, he married Anna Sofie Kröldrup, and established his shop at her home.

When he was about fifty, Olsen completed his calculations for the world clock he envisioned. He showed them to Professor Elis Strömgren who approved them. However, it took another twenty years to acquire the funds necessary to build the clock.

In 1943, when he was 71 years old, and Denmark was under German occupation, the Technological Institute of Copenhagen placed a workshop and staff at his disposal and work on the clock began in earnest. After his death in 1945, his colleague, Otto Mortensen, took over the project and, after its successful completion in 1955, prepared a detailed monograph.

The clock was started on 15 December 1955 at 3 o'clock in the afternoon. Olsen had died ten years earlier in 1945 of thrombosis. His clock continues to work, and is one of the most accurate mechanical devices in the world.

== Other works ==
- Telescope (see http://www.forum.2astro.dk/forum/topic.asp?TOPIC_ID=5028&SearchTerms=renovering,af,zeiss)
- Telescope of the Rundetårn in Copenhagen
