= NGC 1659 =

Galaxy in the constellation Eridanus

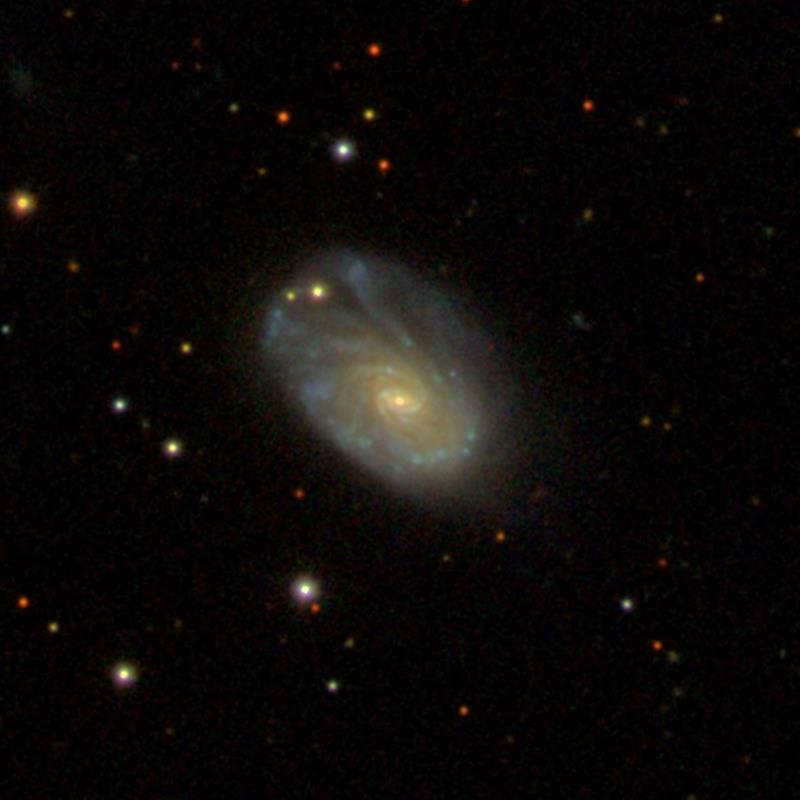
- NGC 1659 imaged by SDSS

Observation data (J2000 epoch)
- Constellation: Eridanus
- Right ascension: 04^{h} 46^{m} 29.9333^{s}
- Declination: −04° 47′ 19.812″
- Redshift: 0.015581±0.0000190
- Heliocentric radial velocity: 4,671±6 km/s
- Distance: 142.92 ± 19.01 Mly (43.818 ± 5.828 Mpc)
- Group or cluster: NGC 1667 group (LGG 118)
- Apparent magnitude (V): 13.14

Characteristics
- Type: SA(r)bc pec
- Size: ~72,700 ly (22.28 kpc) (estimated)
- Apparent size (V): 1.6′ × 1.1′

Other designations
- IRAS 04440-0452, 2MASX J04462995-0447193, NGC 1677, MCG -01-13-006, PGC 15977

NGC 1659 is a peculiar spiral galaxy in the constellation of Eridanus. Its velocity with respect to the cosmic microwave background is 4,634±6 km/s, which corresponds to a Hubble distance of 222.9 ± 15.6 Mly (68.35 ± 4.79 Mpc). However, 11 non-redshift measurements give a much closer mean distance of 142.92 ± 19.01 Mly (43.818 ± 5.828 Mpc). It was discovered by German-British astronomer William Herschel on 28 November 1786. The galaxy was also observed by American astronomer Lewis Swift on 22 October 1886, and listed as NGC 1677. (Note: Both SIMBAD and NED list NGC 1677 as being the same galaxy as IC 2099, but this is an error introduced with the RNGC.)

NGC 1659 is a Seyfert II galaxy, i.e. it has a quasar-like nucleus with very high surface brightnesses whose spectra reveal strong, high-ionisation emission lines, but unlike quasars, the host galaxy is clearly detectable.

== NGC 1667 group ==
NGC 1659 is a member of the NGC 1667 galaxy group (also known as LGG 118). This group contains at least nine galaxies, including NGC 1645, NGC 1667, IC 387, IC 2097, IC 2101, MCG -01-13-012, PGC 15779 and PGC 16061.

== See also ==
- List of NGC objects (1001–2000)
