= Jens Olsen's World Clock =

Advanced astronomical clock

Coordinates: 55°40′32″N 12°34′10″E

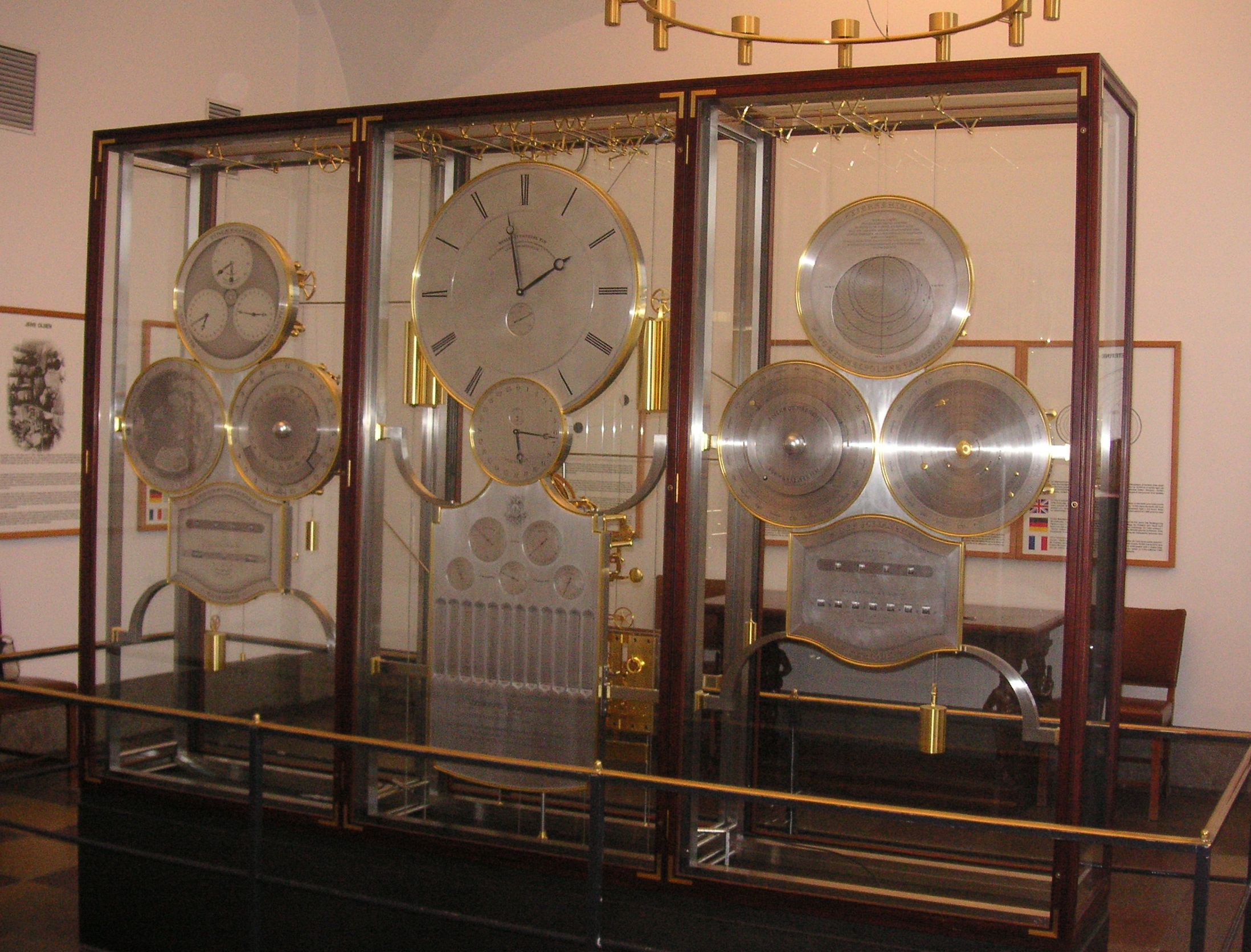
The front of Jens Olsen's World Clock

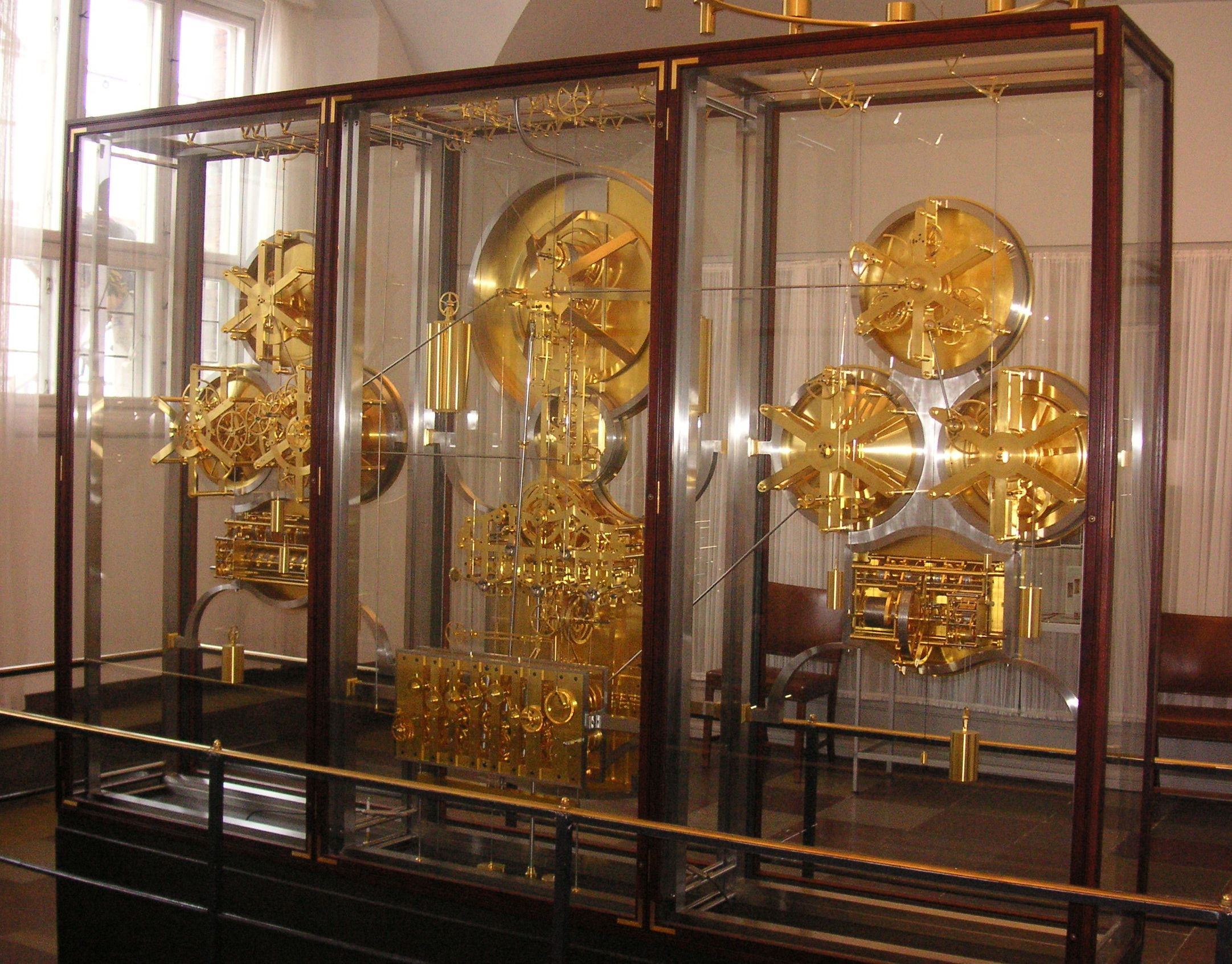
The back of Jens Olsen's World Clock

Jens Olsen's World Clock or Verdensur is an advanced astronomical clock which is displayed in Copenhagen City Hall. The clock consists of 12 movements which together have 15,448 parts. The clock is mechanical and must be wound once a week. Displays include lunar and solar eclipses, positions of the stellar bodies, and a perpetual calendar, in addition to the time. The fastest gear completes a revolution every ten seconds and the slowest every 25,753 years.

== History ==
The clock was designed and calculated by Jens Olsen (1872–1945), who was a skilled locksmith, and later learned the trade of clockmaking. He also took part in the beginning of the clock's construction, and died in 1945, 10 years before the clock was completed.

The calculations for the clock were made up until 1928, after which they were supervised by the astronomer Elis Strömgren. The drawings for the clock were made between 1934 and 1936, and the actual production of the clock took place from 1943 until 1955. The clock was started on 15 December 1955 by King Frederik IX and Jens Olsen's youngest grandchild Birgit.

Deviations in expected readings identified in 1991 were caused by increased friction from oil in the pivots hardening from prolonged sun and oxygen exposure. As a result the clock was largely disassembled to be refurbished and upgraded:

1. All brass and bronze parts were re-gilt
2. 470 pivot locations were altered to accept miniature ball bearings, not visible when assembled
3. Some arbors were coated in a low-friction nickel/teflon mixture

The restoration process started in 1995 and concluded in 1997 and was entrusted to Soren Andersen, a Danish specialist in clock making and conservation.

== Design ==
=== Aesthetic ===
The clock is located centrally in a dedicated room, surrounded by smaller, related displays and descriptions of various aspects of the clock. The clock itself is enclosed in a large glass case with wooden and stainless framing, and sits on a granite base. The clock faces the singular entrance to the room, but visitors can view it from all sides to see the intricacy of the design. The enclosure has internal lighting, and is temperature and humidity controlled by a ventilation plant in the basement of the building. As it exists today the gearing and module structure is largely gold-plated brass, while the dials are rhodium plated.

=== Escapement ===
The escapement is a Dennison-style double triple-leg gravity escapement, a design choice common in later tower clocks that prioritizes accuracy over efficiency. In simple terms, the escapement itself acts as a remontoire such that variations in input torque are largely decoupled and do not influence the pendulum. However, this design choice necessitates significant input power (in the case of the World Clock significant weight) to compensate for the energy surplus that is "dumped" by the air-brake with each tick. The pendulum is a "seconds pendulum" and therefore requires a theoretical length of 994.5 mm for Copenhagen's local gravity, although due to the dispersed mass the physical pendulum is slightly longer to give the correct period. Material selection is diligent: the pendulum rod is Invar, the impulse rods sapphire, and the movement is highly jeweled. The escape wheel is a relatively unusual, 5-tooth design.

=== Movements ===
The clock movements are modular, such that an observer may more easily identify them and understand the functioning of the clock more readily. Additionally, it permits many movements to be removed and maintained without necessitating stopping the entire clock. The number of escapements is occasionally stated as 11 rather than 12, this ambiguity arises from whether the Mean Time and Sidereal Time are considered a single movement. All but the Equation Works movements have dials on the front of the clock, arranged in left, center, and right sections.

==== Mean Time ====
The Mean Time movement is located at the top of the center section and has the largest dial of the clock showing hours and minutes on a 12-hour dial, as well as a smaller inset dial with seconds on a 60-second dial.

==== Sidereal Time ====
The Sidereal Time movement is located directly below the Mean Time movement in the center section, and has a 24-hour dial with a minute hand and hour hand. There is also a smaller inset 60-second dial with a seconds hand.

==== Main Calendar ====
The Main Calendar is located at the bottom of the center section, and includes 5 dials for dominical letter, epact, solar cycle, cycle of indiction, and lunar cycle. Below these is a display of the calendar noting the dates of moveable feasts, day-of-week for all dates, and dates of full, new, and quarter moons.

==== Triple Dial ====
The "Triple Dial" is located at the top of the left section and includes three dials inset into a larger circular frame: The Equation of Time (top), Solar Time (lower right), and Local Mean Solar Time (lower left). The solar time dials each have a minute and hour had on 24-hour dials. The Equation of Time (EoT) dial has a hand for universal EoT (marked "A") and a hand for EoT at the clock's location (marked "B"). The difference between these hands is the local constant, a fixed value corresponding to the longitude difference between the clock's location (~13° E) and the time zone reference (UTC+01:00, so 15°E)

==== Synchronoscope ====
The Synchronoscope is the leftmost dial in the left section, and shows the time of day anywhere in the world. This is accomplished with a fixed map (in the form of a southern pole projection) around which a 24-hour dial rotates. This module also generates the impulse signal to the Gregorian Calendar (directly below it) and the Julian Period modules.

==== Sunrise/Sunset ====
The Sunrise/Sunset movement is the rightmost movement of the left section, and includes a part of shutters that move throughout the year to indicate the time of sunrise and sunset. These can be read from an inner stationary 24-hour solar time dial or an outer 24-hour mean time dial (compensating for the EoT).

==== Gregorian Calendar ====
The Gregorian Calendar is located at the bottom of the left section. It displays the year, month, day of month, and day of week. These are changed discontinuously at mean midnight, and are otherwise not moving.

==== Stellar Heavens ====
The Stellar Heavens movement is the top dial of the right section, and shows the current overhead celestial sphere. This is displayed using a stereoscopic projection (similar to an astrolabe), with fixed threads showing reference lines for meridian and zenith in the local frame and tropics, equator, and circumpolar circle in the celestial frame. The polar precession circle is also marked, which is notably the slowest motion in the clock.

==== Heliocentric Revolution ====
The Heliocentric Revolution movement is located on the right side of the right section and is functionally an orrery, showing the 8 planets rotating about a fixed sun and their locations relative to a fixed outer zodiac dial. Pluto was discovered in 1930, shortly after the calculations for the clock were completed, however with the IAU redefining the term planet in 2006 the clock once again includes all planets. The motion of the planets is constant and circular, and the orbit spacing has been made uniform.

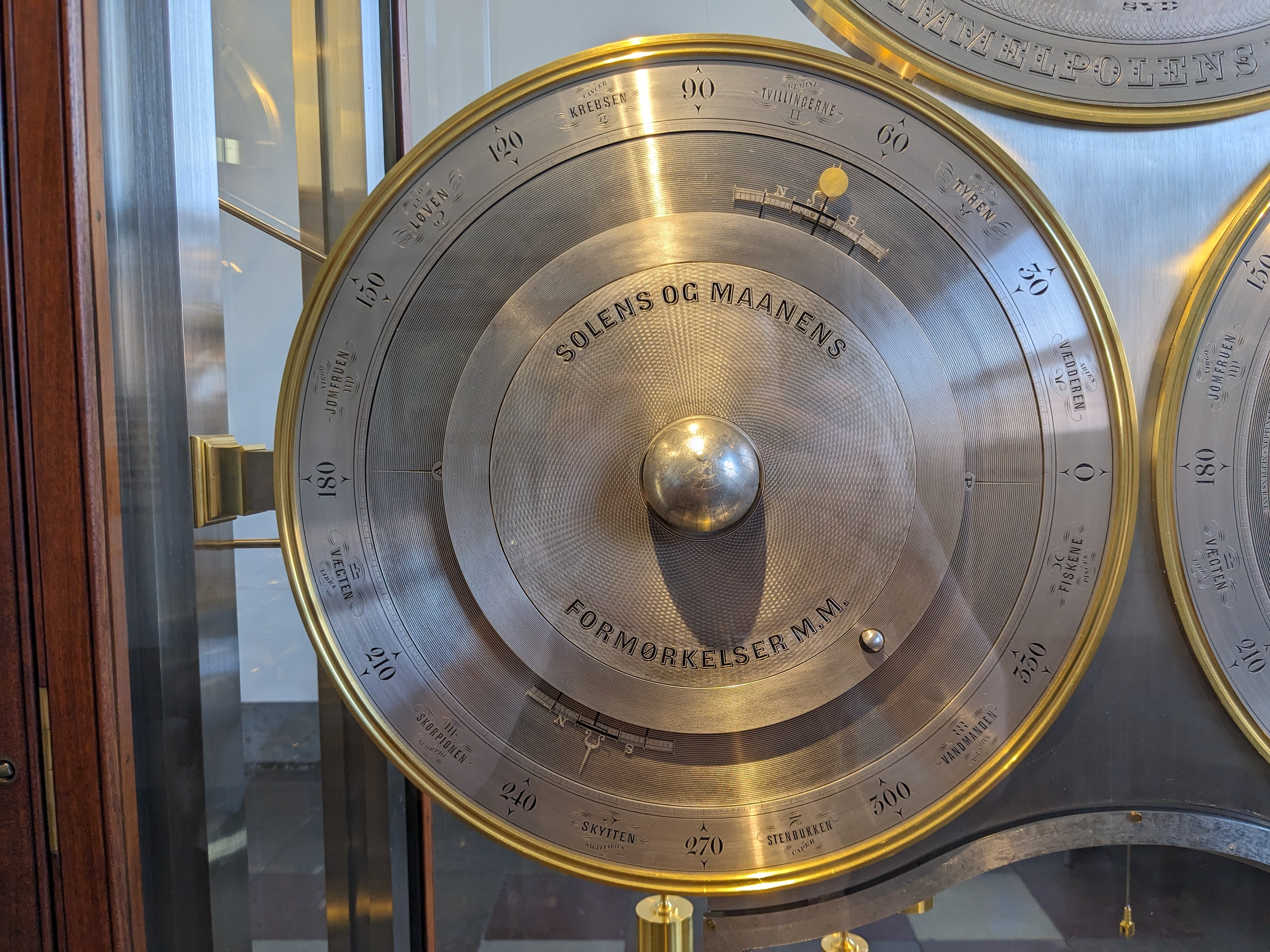
Geocentric Revolution Dial. The sun position is visible on top left and close to aligned with a lunar node. This lunar node and its complement at lower left have arcs corresponding to the range of alignment necessary for total and partial eclipses. The moon position is visible on lower right, with phase approaching 3rd quarter. Lunar perigee is marked with a "P" on right, and apogee with an "A" on left. The outer dial indicates Right Ascension in degrees, interspersed with the zodiacal constellations.

==== Geocentric Revolution ====
The Geocentric Revolution dial is located on the left of the right section, and shows the ecliptic longitudes of the sun, moon, lunisolar nodes, lunar perigee, and moon phase. These are all complex motions, particularly the moon position, however these calculations are not performed in this module alone. Rather, most of the formulation of anomalies is handled by the Equation Works and transmitted to the Geocentric Revolution dial, where they are combined with mean motions via differentials to produce the display.

==== Julian Period ====
The Julian Period movement is located at the bottom of the right section, and indicates both the Julian Year as well as the Julian Day. These are both discontinuous motions like the Gregorian Calendar, but with a roll-over time of 1pm CET.

==== Equation Works ====
The Equation Works movement has no display on the front of the clock, and is located behind the Main Calendar in the center section. However, it has labelling that is indicative of its various functions, as well as small dials for setting them. The purpose of the Equation Works is to create rotational rates of astronomical significance to be used elsewhere in the clock either directly, or to produce some linear motion at those rates to be used elsewhere. The Equation Works has its own weight as a power source and is regulated in time with a 36 tooth ratchet wheel advanced by an impulse from the Mean Time module.

These rates and their usages are listed here, in order of left to right when looking at the front of the clock (or right to left if viewing from the back, where the movement is more visible):

1. 1/2 Tropical Year (182d 14h 54m 23s).
  - Generates a sinusoidal linear signal via a Tusi Couple for the effect of obliquity in the Equation of Time. This is then summed via pulley with the effect of eccentricity to create the Equation of Time Signal. Note: this motion is generated after (and therefore includes) the phase shift from the anomalistic year arbor.
  - Rotational rate directly transmitted to the Sunrise/Sunset movement. Note: this motion is generated before (and therefore does not include) the phase shift from the anomalistic year arbor.
2. 1 Anomalistic Year (365d 6h 13m 56s).
  - Generates a sinusoidal linear signal via a Tusi Couple for the effect of eccentricity in the Equation of Time. This is then summed via pulley with the effect of obliquity to create the Equation of Time Signal.
  - Generates a pseudo-sinusoidal rotation via eccentric that is added to the 1/2 tropical year prior to the Tusi Couple on that arbor. This captures the phase shift from the effect of eccentricity on the effect of obliquity in the Equation of Time.
  - Generates a pseudo-sinusoidal linear signal via a crank that is ultimately summed into the lunar anomalies to model the annual equation.
3. 1/2 Draconic Month (13d 14h 32m 48s)
  - Generates a pseudo-sinusoidal linear signal via a crank that is ultimately summed into the lunar anomalies to model lunar reduction.
4. 1/2 Synodic Month (14d 18h 22m 1s)
  - Generates a pseudo-sinusoidal linear signal via a crank that is ultimately summed into the lunar anomalies to model lunar variation.
5. Lunar Node Oscillation (173.31001d)
  - Generates a pseudo-sinusoidal linear signal via a crank, which is transmitted to the Geocentric Revolution module to be added to the mean nodal precession rate to give the position of nodes.
6. Lunar Apsides Oscillation (205.89744d)
  - Generates a pseudo-sinusoidal linear signal via a crank, which is transmitted to the Geocentric Revolution module to be added to the mean apsidal precession rate to give the line of apsides.
7. Lunar Evection (31d 19h 29m)
  - Generates a pseudo-sinusoidal linear signal via a crank that is ultimately summed into the lunar anomalies to model evection.
8. Anomalistic Lunar Month (27d 13h 18m)
  - Generates a sinusoidal linear signal via a Tusi Couple that is ultimately summed into the lunar anomalies to model the Great Lunar Anomaly (Equation of the Center).

=== Inter-Movement Connections ===
Information is passed between movements through three means, depending on the type:

1. Rotational information is transmitted via sets of bevels gears at both the source and destination module, with a shaft between them. These are continuously rotating (unbounded), although not always constant speeds. The gearing at both modules is always configured such that the shaft rotates at a meaningful rate (such as 1 rotation per mean day). Note that this is not the simplest design but helps observers understand more readily, likely by intent.
2. Linear translations are transmitted via steel ribbons. These are analog signals of limited range (bounded), such as the current value of the Equation of Time or various solar and lunar anomalies. The ribbons generally go upwards to the top of the case, where there is a bell-crank system to transfer them horizontally to above the relevant destination movement, from which they can descend.
3. Impulses are transferred via rods. These are discretely occurring signals that trigger discontinuous events, such as midnight causing the date to change. These also use the bell-crank system in the top of the case

== See also ==
- Clock of the Long Now
- Rasmus Sørnes
