= Østervold Observatory =

Former astronomical observatory of the University of Copenhagen in Denmark

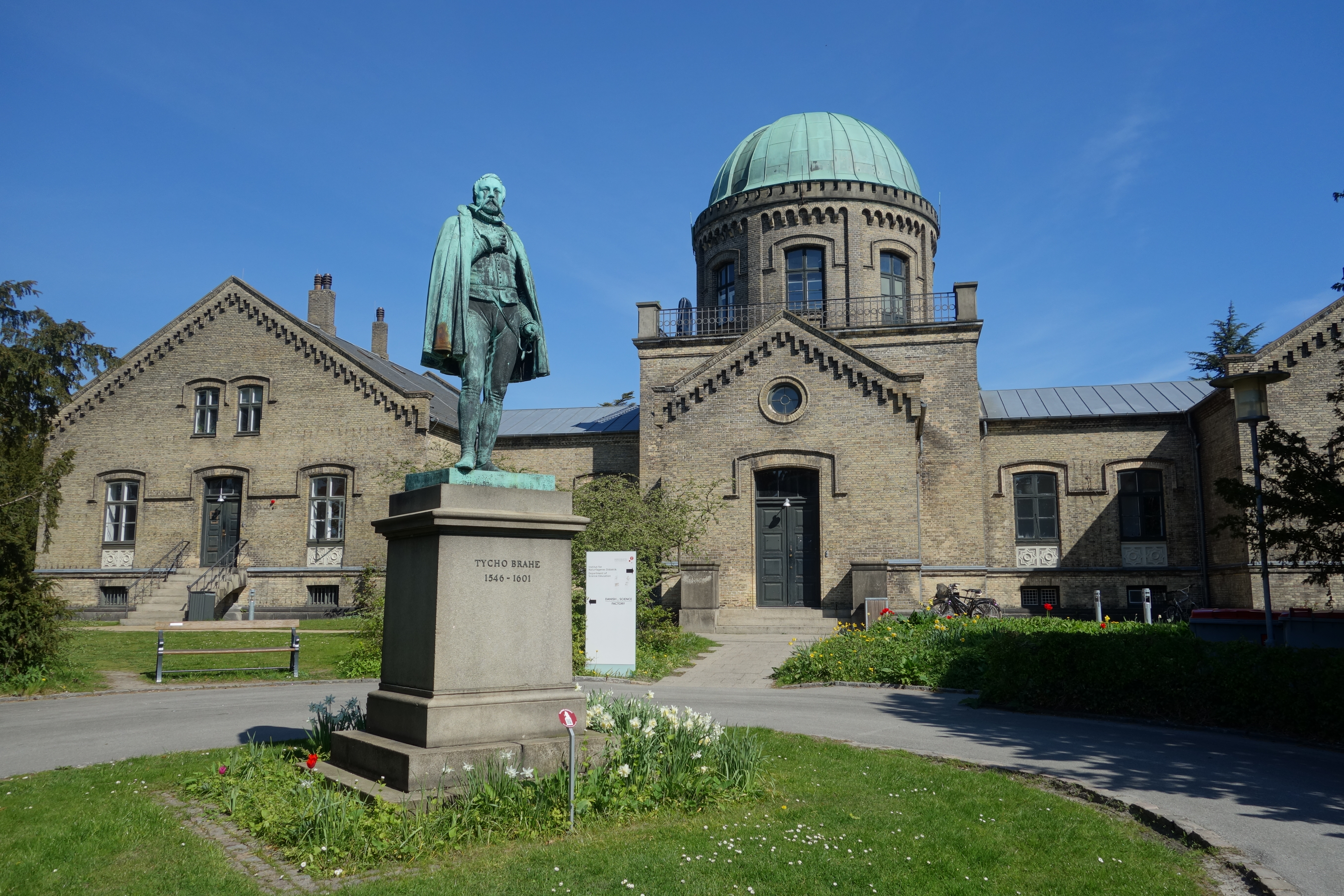
- Alternative names: Copenhagen University Observatory
- Organization: University of Copenhagen
- Observatory code: 035
- Location: Copenhagen Municipality, Capital Region of Denmark, Denmark
- Coordinates: 55°41′13″N 12°34′33″E
- Location of Østervold Observatory
- Related media on Commons

Østervold Observatory (or Copenhagen University Observatory; Danish: Københavns Universitet Astronomisk Observatorium) is a former astronomical observatory (IAU code 035) in Copenhagen, Denmark owned and operated by the University of Copenhagen (Københavns Universitet). It opened in 1861 as a replacement for the university's old observatory at Rundetårn.

The Østervold Observatory building house the Institute for Science Didactics of the University of Copenhagen.

== History ==
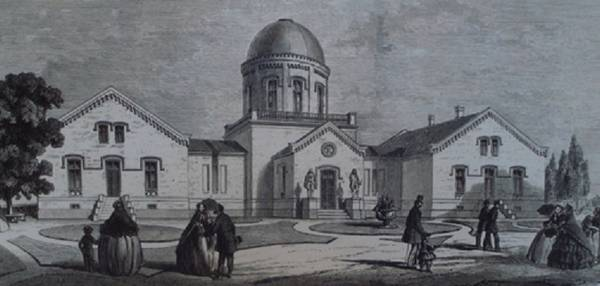
Østervold Observatory

The first astronomical observatory operated by the University of Copenhagen was Rundetårn. It had been inaugurated in 1642 as a replacement for Tycho Brahe's Stjerneborg, but during the early 19th century had become outdated as astronomical instruments grew bigger and bigger while the tower could not be expanded. In the same time, light pollution from the surrounding city as well as vibrations caused by the still increasing traffic in the streets below had made the observations inaccurate.

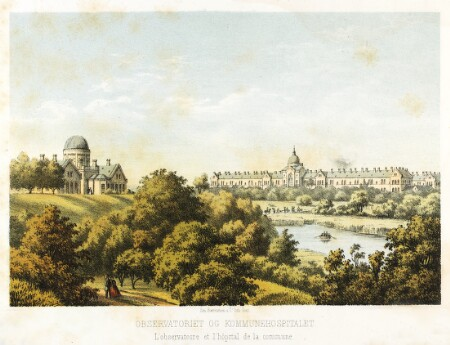
The dome of the observatory

In 1861 the observatory was moved to Østervold, where a new observatory was constructed on the old bastioned fortifications of the city, which had become outdated and were being abandoned. The well-known Russian-German astronomer, Heinrich Louis d'Arrest, who had been appointed professor in astronomy at the university in 1857, was chosen to plan the new observatory. He used the observatory for his study of nebulas, in 1867 publishing an astronomical catalogue of 1,942 nebulas with 4,900 positions. He also did significant work in spectroscopy, and discovered, for the first time, the differences in the evolutionary state and spatial distribution of stars. While d'Arrest used the main telescope, observer H. C. F. C. Schjellerup used the Meridian circle for creating one of the most comprehensive astronomical catalogues of the time of stars of the 8th-9th magnitude: 10,000 positions on 259 observation nights.

The next director of the Østervold Observatory was Thorvald N. Thiele, a skilful mathematician who developed a new method of determining the orbit of Binary stars. He founded the tradition for numerical computational mathematics, which has lasted up to modern times.

In 1907, Elis Strömgren was appointed professor and director of the observatory, and under his direction the computational work continued.

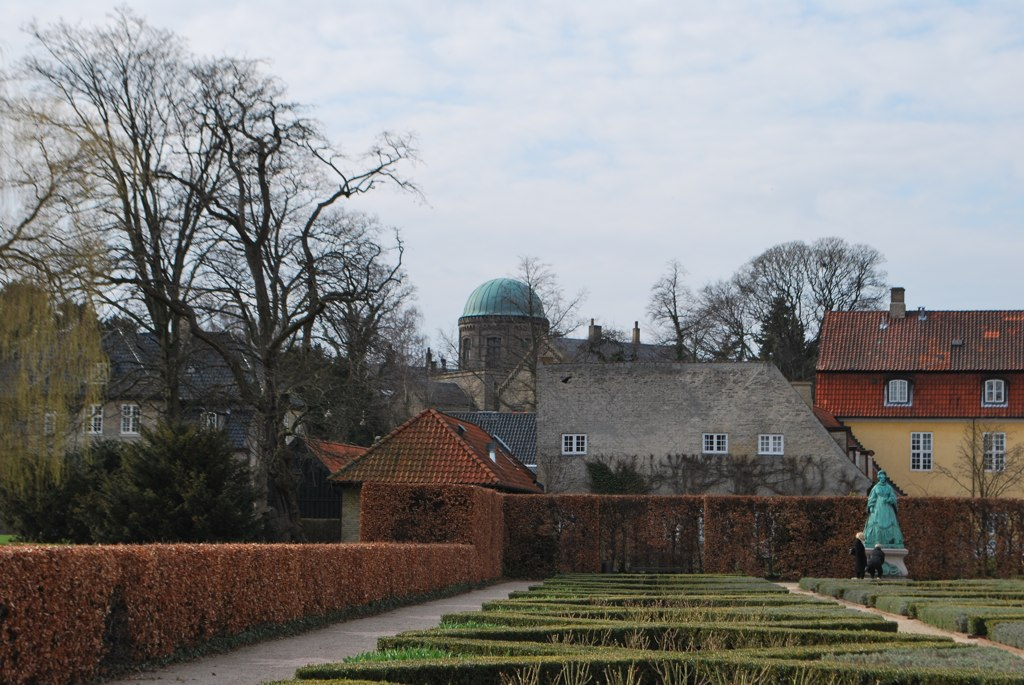
The dome of the observatory seen from Rosenborg Castle Gardens

During World War I, the Central Bureau for Astronomical Telegrams, founded by Astronomische Gesellschaft in 1882, was moved from Kiel, Germany, to the Østervold Observatory. It remained located in Copenhagen until 1965, when it was moved to the Smithsonian Astrophysical Observatory, Cambridge, United States.

In 1940 Ellis Strömgren was succeeded by his son Bengt Strömgren, who made the pioneering discovery that hydrogen is the most abundant element in the stellar interior. He was also the first to make the correct interpretation of the Hertzsprung–Russell diagram (the relation between the total energy output from a star and its surface temperature was independently found by the Danish chemist and astronomer Ejnar Hertzsprung and the American astronomer Henry Norris Russell). Around 1950, he developed the uvbyß photoelectric system, which is still in use today.

In the 1950s, the Østervold Observatory was replaced by the Brorfelde Observatory located near the town of Holbæk, which was provided with a very fine meridian circle and a Schmidt telescope with a camera that used photographic film. It houses a 300 double reflector with a focal depth of 4.9m.

== Building ==
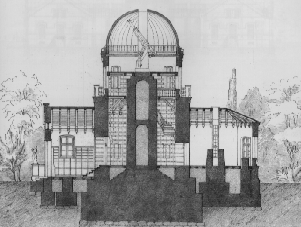
Østervold ObservatoryWium

The Østervold Observatory is a south-facing, three-winged building, designed by Christian Hansen. The central wing is topped by a dome. containing the main instrument. The side wings contained residences for the director, the observer as well as assistants. To secure the best possible foundation of the instruments, the foundation of the building rests on the original, true ground surface, penetrating the entire depth of the ramparts on which the building stands. This took 1/3 of the bricks used for the entire complex.

The Østervold Observatory building is no longer used for astronomy, but it was often used among ornithologists. The buildings house the Institute for Science Didactics University of Copenhagen.

=== Instruments ===
The original main instrument of the observatory, housed in the dome, was a 280 mm refractor with a focal distance of 4.9 m. In 1895, this telescope was replaced by a 360 mm refractor with a focal length of 4.9 m and a 200 mm photographic lens with a focal length of 4.8 m. The purchase of the double refractor enabled the observatory to participate in photographic observations without having to give up visual observations. This double refractor is still found in the dome of the Østervold Observatory, while the 1861 refractor is displayed at the Steno Museum in Århus. c

== Directors ==
1862-1875: Heinrich Louis d'Arrest
1875-1907: Thorvald N. Thiele
1907-1940: Elis Strömgren
1940–1951. Bengt Strömgren

== See also ==
- Brorfelde Observatory
- List of astronomical observatories
- Rundetårn
