= Central Bureau for Astronomical Telegrams =

International Astronomical organisation

The Central Bureau for Astronomical Telegrams (CBAT) is an official international clearing house for information relating to transient astronomical events.

The CBAT collects and distributes information on comets, natural satellites, novae, meteors, and other transient astronomical events. The CBAT has historically established priority of discovery (who gets credit for it) and announced initial designations and names of new objects.

On behalf of the International Astronomical Union (IAU) from 1920 to 2015, the CBAT distributed IAU Circulars. From the 1920s to 1992, CBAT sent telegrams in urgent cases, although most circulars were sent via regular mail; when telegrams were dropped, the name "telegram" was kept for historical reasons, and the Central Bureau Electronic Telegrams (CBETs) were begun a decade later as a digital-only expanded version of the IAUCs, still issued by e-mail to subscribers and posted at the CBAT website. Since the mid-1980s the IAU Circulars and the related Minor Planet Circulars have been available electronically.

The CBAT is a non-profit organization, but charges for its IAU Circulars and electronic telegrams to finance its continued operation.

== History ==
The Central Bureau was founded by Astronomische Gesellschaft in 1882 at Kiel, Germany. During World War I it was moved to the Østervold Observatory at Copenhagen, Denmark, to be operated there by the Copenhagen University Observatory.

In 1922, the IAU made the Central Bureau its official Bureau Central des Télégrammes Astronomiques (French for Central Bureau for Astronomical Telegrams), and it remained in Copenhagen until 1965, when it moved to the Harvard College Observatory, to be operated there by the Smithsonian Astrophysical Observatory on the Harvard University campus. In 2010, the CBAT moved from SAO to the Department of Earth and Planetary Sciences at Harvard University.

It has remained in Cambridge, Massachusetts to this day. The HCO had maintained a western-hemisphere Central Bureau from 1883 until the IAU's CBAT moved there at the end of 1964, so logically the HCO staff took over the IAU's Bureau.

== See also ==
- List of astronomical societies
- Minor Planet Center
