= Necklace Nebula =

Planetary nebula in the constellation Sagitta

Emission nebula
- Planetary nebula
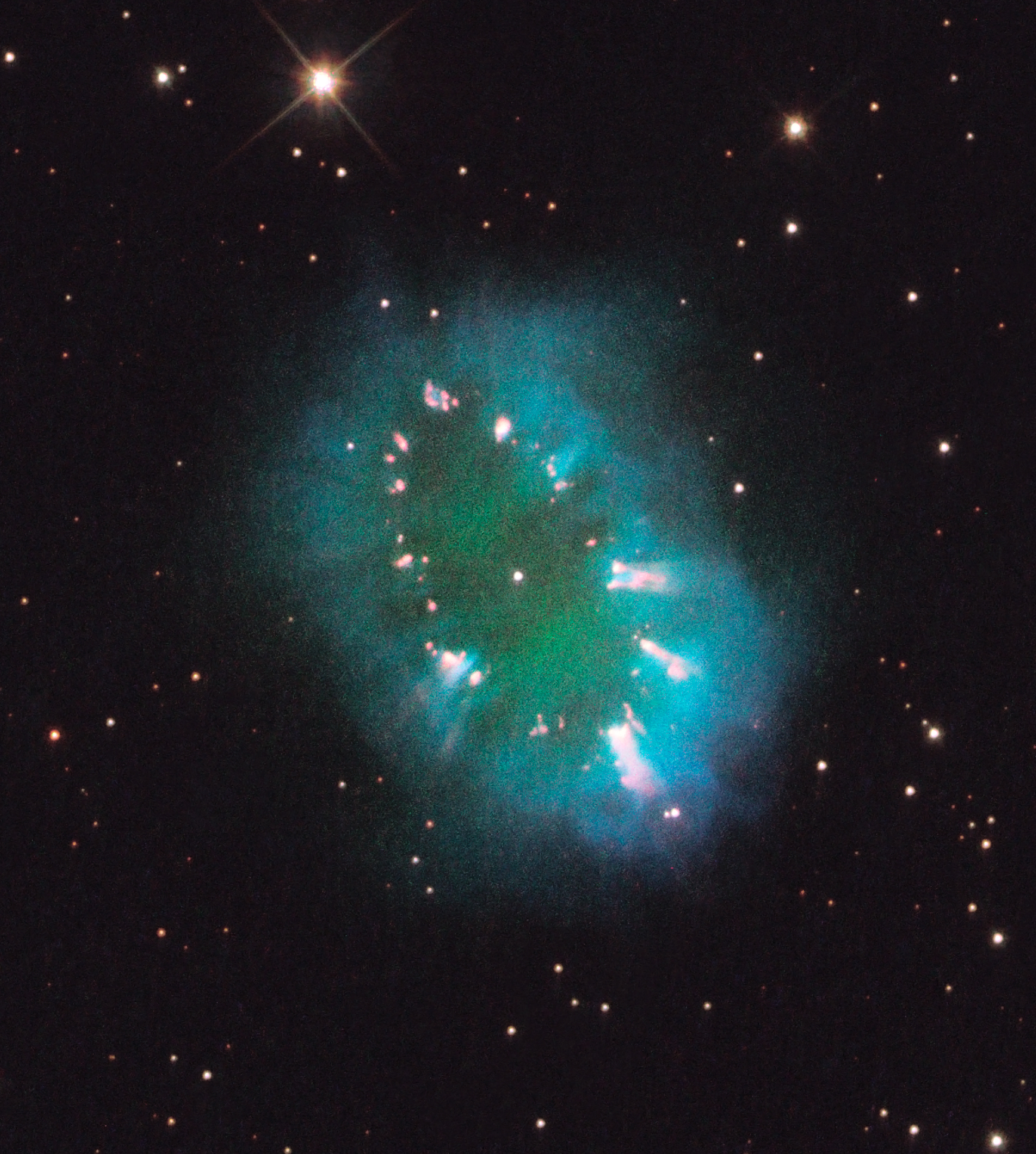
- Hubble image of the Necklace Nebula, displaying the hydrogen (blue), oxygen (green), and nitrogen (red) emission.

Observation data: J2000 epoch
- Right ascension: 19^{h} 43^{m} 59.51104^{s}
- Declination: +17° 09′ 00.9579″
- Distance: 15.0 ± 3.6 kly (4.6 ± 1.1 kpc) pc
- Apparent diameter: 0.35′
- Constellation: Sagitta

Physical characteristics
- Radius: 4.4 ly (1.35 pc) pc
- Designations: IRAS 19417+1701, IPHASX J194359.5+170901, PN G054.2-03.4

The Necklace Nebula (PN G054.2-03.4) is a 19-trillion-kilometre-wide (2.0 light-years-wide) planetary nebula located about 15,000 light-years away in the northern constellation Sagitta. It was discovered in 2005 from the Isaac Newton Telescope Photometric H-alpha Survey (IPHAS), a ground-based H-alpha planetary nebula study of the North Galactic Plane.

The Necklace Nebula is the exploded aftermath of a giant star that came too close to its Sun-like binary companion. The two stars that produced the Necklace Nebula are in a relatively small orbit about each other. They have a period of 1.2 days and a separation on the order of 5 times the radius of the Sun.

About 25,000 years ago, one of the aging stars ballooned to the point where it engulfed its companion star. The smaller star continued orbiting inside its larger companion, increasing the giant's rotation rate.

The bloated companion star spun so fast that a large part of its gaseous envelope expanded into space. Due to centrifugal force, most of the gas escaped along the star's equator, producing a ring. The embedded bright knots are dense gas clumps in the ring.

The IAU Working Group on Star Names approved the name Necklace for the nebula's central star (IRAS 19417+1701) on 13 June 2026.

== Gallery ==
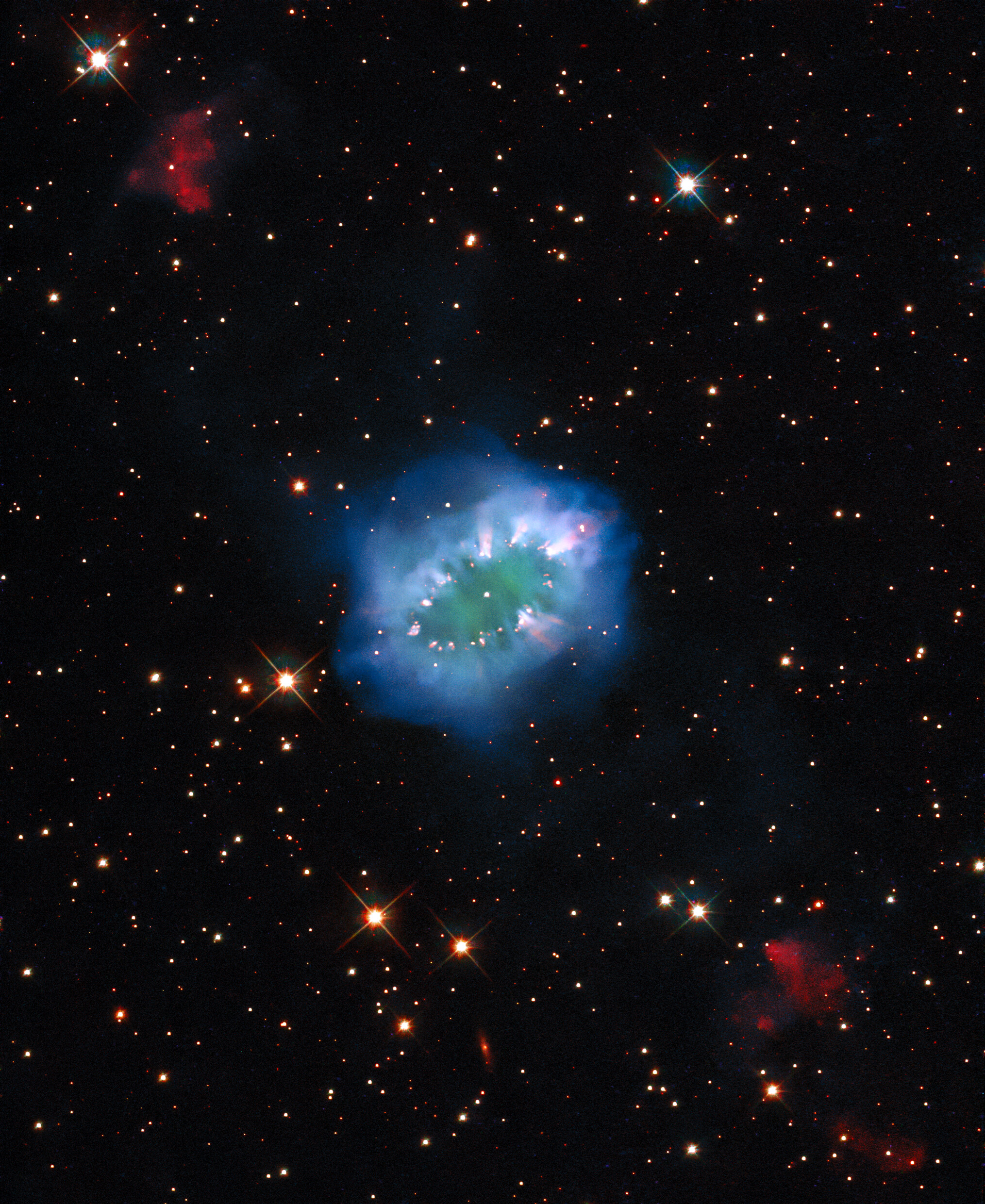
The interaction of two doomed stars has created this spectacular ring adorned with bright clumps of gas — a diamond necklace of cosmic proportions.
