= Strömgren integral =

Operation in mathematical calculus

In mathematics and astrophysics, the Strömgren integral, introduced by Bengt Strömgren while computing the Rosseland mean opacity, is the integral

$$\frac{15}{4\pi^4}\int_0^x \frac{t^7e^{2t}}{(e^t-1)^3} \, dt .$$

The Strömgren integral has applications to astrophysics.
