= Minor Planet Center =

International astronomical organization

The Minor Planet Center (MPC) is the official body for observing and reporting on minor planets under the auspices of the International Astronomical Union (IAU). Founded in 1947, it operates at the Smithsonian Astrophysical Observatory.

== Function ==
The Minor Planet Center is the official worldwide organization in charge of collecting observational data for minor planets (such as asteroids), calculating their orbits and publishing this information via the Minor Planet Circulars. Under the auspices of the International Astronomical Union (IAU), it operates at the Smithsonian Astrophysical Observatory, which is part of the Center for Astrophysics along with the Harvard College Observatory.

The MPC runs a number of free online services for observers to assist them in observing minor planets and comets. The complete catalogue of minor planet orbits (sometimes referred to as the "Minor Planet Catalogue") may also be freely downloaded. In addition to astrometric data, the MPC collects light curve photometry of minor planets. A key function of the MPC is helping observers coordinate follow up observations of possible near-Earth objects (NEOs) via its NEO web form and blog, the Near-Earth Object Confirmation Page. The MPC is also responsible for identifying, and alerting to, new NEOs with a risk of impacting Earth in the few weeks following their discovery (see Potentially hazardous objects and § Videos).

== History ==
The Minor Planet Center was set up at the University of Cincinnati in 1947, under the direction of Paul Herget. Upon Herget's retirement on June 30, 1978, the MPC was moved to the Smithsonian Astrophysical Observatory, under the direction of Brian G. Marsden. From 2006 to 2015, the director of the MPC was Timothy Spahr, who oversaw a staff of five. From 2015 to 2021, the Minor Planet Center was headed by interim director Matthew Holman. Under his leadership, the MPC experienced a significant period of reorganization and growth, doubling both its staff size and the volume of observations processed per year. Upon Holman's resignation on February 9, 2021 (announced on February 19, 2021) Matthew Payne became acting director of the MPC.

=== Directors ===
- 1947–1978: Paul Herget
- 1978–2006: Brian Marsden
- 2006–2015: Timothy Spahr
- 2015–2021: Matthew Holman
- 2021–present: Matthew Payne

== Periodical publications ==
The MPC periodically releases astrometric observations of minor planets, as well as of comets and natural satellites. These publications are the Minor Planet Circulars (MPCs), the Minor Planet Electronic Circulars (MPECs), and the Minor Planet Supplements (MPSs and MPOs). An extensive archive of publications in a PDF format is available at the Minor Planet Center's website. The archive's oldest publication dates back to 1 November 1979 (MPC 4937–5016).

- Minor Planet Circulars (M.P.C. or MPCs), established 1947, is a scientific journal that is generally published by the Minor Planet Center on the date of each full moon, when the number of reported observations are minimal due to the brighter night sky. The Circulars contain astrometric observations, orbits and ephemerides of minor planets, comets and certain natural satellites. The astrometric observations of comets are published in full, while the minor planet observations are summarised by observatory code (the full observations now being given in the Minor Planet Circulars Supplement). New numberings and namings of minor planets (also see Naming of Minor Planets), as well as numberings of periodic comets and natural satellites, are announced in the Circulars. New orbits for comets and natural satellites appear in the Circulars; new orbits for minor planets appear in the Minor Planets and Comets Orbit Supplement (see below).
- The Minor Planet Electronic Circulars (MPECs) are published by the Minor Planet Center. They generally contain positional observations and orbits of unusual minor planets and all comets. Monthly lists of observable unusual objects, observable distant objects, observable comets and the critical list of numbered minor planets also appear on these circulars. Daily Orbit Update MPECs, issued every day, contain new identifications and orbits of minor planets, obtained over the previous 24 hours.
- The Minor Planets and Comets Supplement (MPS) is published on behalf of IAU's Division F (Planetary Systems and Bioastronomy) by the Minor Planet Center.
- The Minor Planets and Comets Orbit Supplement (MPO) is published on behalf of IAU's Division F by the Minor Planet Center.

== Natural Satellites Ephemeris Service ==
The Natural Satellites Ephemeris Service is an online service of the Minor Planet Center. The service provides "ephemerides, orbital elements and residual blocks for the outer irregular satellites of the giant planets".

== See also ==
- Central Bureau for Astronomical Telegrams
- IAU Circular
- List of astronomical societies
- List of minor-planet groups
- List of minor planets
- List of minor planets § Main index
- Meanings of minor-planet names
