= Bengt Strömgren =

Danish astronomer and astrophysicist

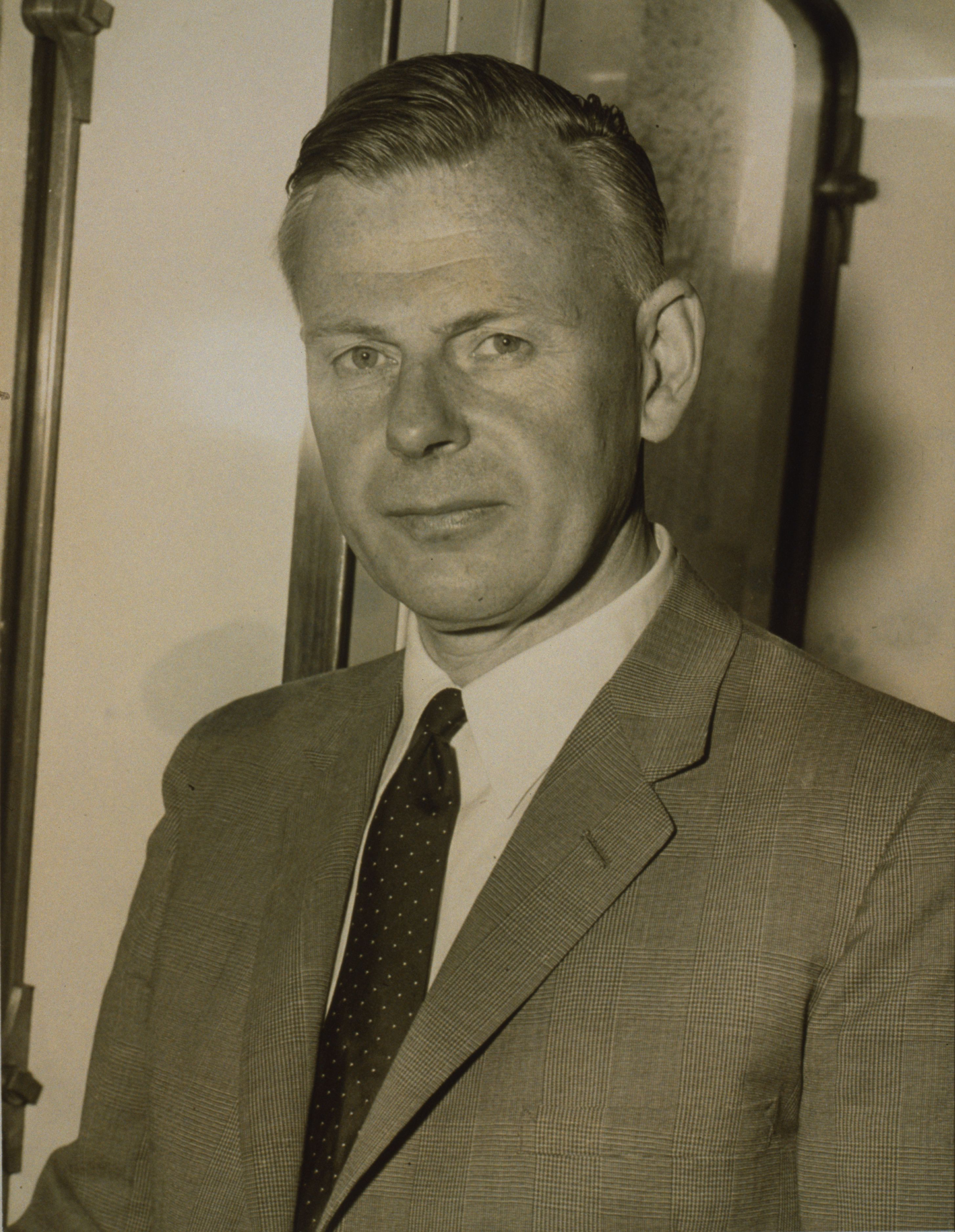
- Bengt Strömgren, 1957
- Born: 21 January 1908; Gothenburg, Sweden
- Died: 4 July 1987 (aged 79); Copenhagen, Denmark
- Education: University of Copenhagen
- Known for: Strömgren Spheres, Strömgren photometric system, stellar chemistry
- Awards: Bruce Medal 1959
- Scientific career
- Fields: Physics, Mathematics, Astronomy
- Workplaces: University of Chicago, Yerkes and McDonald Observatory, Institute for Advanced Study

Bengt Georg Daniel Strömgren (21 January 1908 – 4 July 1987) was a Danish astronomer and astrophysicist.

== Life and career ==
Bengt Strömgren was born in Gothenburg. His parents were Hedvig Strömgren (née Lidforss) and Elis Strömgren, who was professor of astronomy at the University of Copenhagen and director of the University Observatory in Copenhagen. Bengt grew up in the professor's mansion surrounded with scientists, assistants, observers and guests. His father paced and promoted Bengt into a life with science, and Bengt's first paper was published already at the age of 14. He graduated from high school in 1925 and enrolled at the Copenhagen university. Only two years later, he graduated in astronomy and atomic physics, and during the following two years, he completed a doctoral degree, which was evaluated with the best marks in December 1929, when he was 21 years old.

He gained a great deal of useful experience from his studies in theoretical physics at Niels Bohr's Institute close by, and he was at the right place at the right time. He soon found out that he intended to use the fresh theoretical framework of quantum physics in space, and investigate the applications of quantum mechanics in stars. Obviously, questions of nepotism were in play when he applied for an assistantship already in 1925, which he didn't get. But only one year later it was given to him anyway — he was the best, regardless of his employer being also his own father.

After being appointed as lecturer at the university in 1932, Strömgren was invited to the University of Chicago in 1936 by Otto Struve. Going abroad for 18 months meant a lot to the young researcher, and when he went back to Denmark and to the rising national socialism in Europe, he succeeded his father's professorship in 1940. During five years of isolation, under the German occupation of Denmark, he initiated the building of a new Danish Observatory, the Brorfelde Observatory. But after the Second World War, Bengt Strömgren became tired of lacking state funding for the project, and with a stagnant national economy, he felt that he had to leave Danish research, which he did in 1951.

He went to the United States and became director of the Yerkes and McDonald Observatories, and stayed there for six years. In 1957, he was appointed the first professor of theoretical astrophysics at the Institute for Advanced Study in Princeton, where he got Albert Einstein's office. He stayed at Princeton with his family until 1967, when he went back to his homeland Denmark, and became the next to the last resident in a series of great Danish scientists of the Carlsberg Mansion and Honor, which had earlier been occupied by Niels Bohr among others. In 1987, he died after a short period of illness.

== Science ==
Bengt Strömgren made momentous contributions to astrophysics. He found that the chemical composition of stars was very much different than previously assumed. In the late 1930s, he found the relative abundance of hydrogen to be nearly 70%, and helium to be about 27%. Just before the war, he discovered the so-called Strömgren Spheres — huge interstellar shells of ionized hydrogen around stars. And in the 1950s and 1960s, he pioneered photoelectric photometry with a novel four-colour system, now called Strömgren photometric system. Apart from the Danish observatory of Brorfelde, Strömgren was active in the early organisation of the joint European observatory of ESO at La Silla in Chile.

== Honors ==
Awards

- Bruce Medal (1959)
- Gold Medal of the Royal Astronomical Society (1962)
- Henry Norris Russell Lectureship (1965)
- Janssen Medal from the French Academy of Sciences (1967)

=== Memberships ===
- Member of the American Academy of Arts and Sciences (1955)
- Member of the United States National Academy of Sciences (1971)
- Member of the American Philosophical Society (1973)

=== Named after him ===
- Asteroid 1846 Bengt
- Strömgren age
- Strömgren photometry
- Strömgren spheres
- Strömgren integral

Miscellaneous

- Asteroid 1493 Sigrid, named after his wife

== Sources ==
- Svend Cedergreen Bech (ed.): Dansk Biografisk Leksikon (1979–84), 3rd ed. Put on-line by Den Store Danske in 2011. (in Danish)
- Bengt Strömgrens life among the stars, Niels Bohr Institute
- Bruce Medalist Bengt Strömgren
- Autobiography in a celebrative commemorative published by University of Copenhagen November 1930 (176-78) (Berlingske Tidende id. 17.9.1962). (in Danish)
- Knude, Jens, Bengt Stromgren's Work in Photometry, in A.G.D. Philip, A.R. Upgren and K.A. Janes, eds., "Precision Photometry: Astrophysics of the Galaxy", Proceedings of the conference held 3–4 October 1990 at Union College, Schenectady, NY (Davis Press, Schenectady, NY, 1991).
- Rebsdorf, Simon Olling (May 2003): Bengt Strömgren: growing up with astronomy, 1908 - 1932, Journal for the History of Astronomy (ISSN 0021-8286), Vol. 34, Part 2, No. 115, pp. 171 – 199 (2003)
- Rebsdorf, Simon Olling (August 2004): The Father, the Son, and the Stars: Bengt Strömgren and the History of Twentieth Century Astronomy in Denmark and in the USA. Ph.D. dissertation, University of Aarhus.
- Rebsdorf, Simon Olling (February 2007): Bengt Strömgren: Interstellar Glow, Helium Content, and Solar Life Supply, 1932–1940. Centaurus, Vol. 49, Issue 1, pages 56–79.
- Gustafsson, Bengt (2009): Bengt Strömgren’s Approach to the Galaxy, in J. Andersen, J. Bland-Hawthorn & B. Nordström, eds., "The Galaxy Disk in Cosmological Context." Proceedings IAU Symposium No. 254 (Cambridge Univ. Press, 2009), pp. 3–16.
