= Strömgren photometric system =

The Strömgren photometric system, abbreviated also as uvbyβ or simply uvby, and sometimes referred as Strömgren - Crawford photometric system, is a four-colour medium-passband photometric system plus Hβ (H-beta) filters for determining magnitudes and obtaining spectral classification of stars. Its use was pioneered by the Danish astronomer Bengt Strömgren in 1956 and was extended by his colleague the American astronomer David L. Crawford in 1958.

It is often considered to be a powerful tool and successful investigating the brightness and effective temperature of stars. This photometric system also has a general advantage as it can be used to measure the effects of reddening and interstellar extinction. This system also allows calculation of parameters from the $b$ and $y$ filters $(b-y)$ without the effects of reddening, termed $m_1$ and $c_1$.

== Wavelength and half-width response functions ==
The following table shows the characteristics of each of the filters used (represented colors are only approximate):

Strömgren photometric system filter wavelength and half-width response functions
	u	v	b	y	β_{narrow}	β_{wide}
Peak wavelength (nm)	350	411	467	547	485.8	485
Half-width (nm)	30	19	18	23	2.9	12.9

Note: colors are only approximate and based on wavelength to sRGB representation (when possible).

== Indices ==
There are four main highly applied and technical indices: $(b-y)$; $m_1$; $c_1$; and $\beta$.

- $m_1 = (v-b) - (b-y)$
- $c_1=(u-v) - (v-b)$
- $\beta = \beta_{narrow} - \beta_{wide}$

Where;

- $y$ magnitudes are well-correlated with Johnson-Morgan V magnitudes (its V band).
- $(b-y)$ is sensitive to stellar temperature (measure of Paschen continuum).
- $c_1$ is sensitive to the surface gravity (measures Balmer discontinuity strength).
- $m_1$ is sensitive to the metallicity (measure of line blanketing).

== See also ==
- Photometric systems
- Stellar classification
