= OB star =

Type of hot, massive star

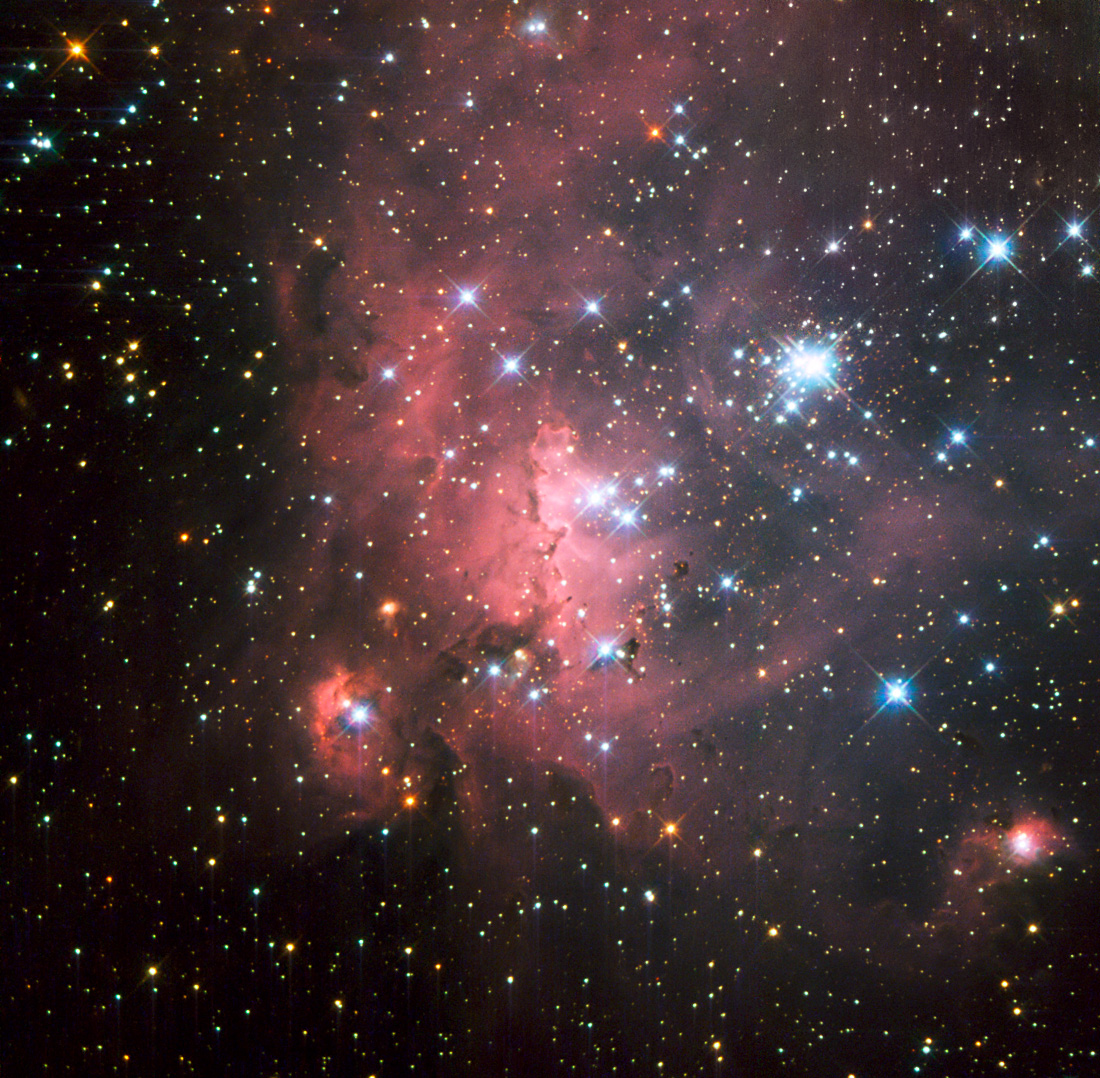
LH 72 is one of the OB associations present in the Large Magellanic Cloud.

OB stars are hot, massive stars of spectral types O or early-type B that form in loosely organized groups called OB associations. They are short lived, and thus do not move very far from where they formed within their life. During their lifetime, they will emit much ultraviolet radiation. This radiation rapidly ionizes the surrounding interstellar gas of the giant molecular cloud, forming an H II region or Strömgren sphere.

In lists of spectra the "spectrum of OB" refers to "unknown, but belonging to an OB association so thus of early type".

== See also ==
- O-type main-sequence star
- B-type main-sequence star
- Stellar kinematics
