= Elis Strömgren =

Swedish–Danish astronomer

Elis Strömgren

Svante Elis Strömgren (31 May 1870 – 5 April 1947) was a Swedish–Danish astronomer.

Strömgren was born in 1870 in Helsingborg, in the Scania province of Sweden. He received his doctorate at Lund University in 1898, becoming docent there the same year. He worked at the University of Kiel from 1901, and assisted in the publication of Astronomische Nachrichten from 1901 to 1904. He became Professor of Astronomy and director of the Copenhagen Observatory of the University of Copenhagen in 1907. He died in Copenhagen in 1947. The minor planet 1422 Strömgrenia was named in his honour.

Strömgren worked in a variety of fields but was particularly interested in theoretical astronomy and celestial mechanics, publishing works on the origin and orbits of comets. He also worked on the calculations for Jens Olsen's World Clock after 1928.

His spouse, the dentist and writer Hedvig Lidforss (1877–1967), was daughter of the philologist Edvard Lidforss in Lund, and sister of the publicist and botanist Bengt Lidforss. Elis Strömgren's sons were the astronomer Bengt Strömgren, who succeeded his father in Copenhagen in 1940 and Erik Strömgren notable danish psychiatrist.
