= NGC 5500 =

Galaxy in the constellation of Boötes

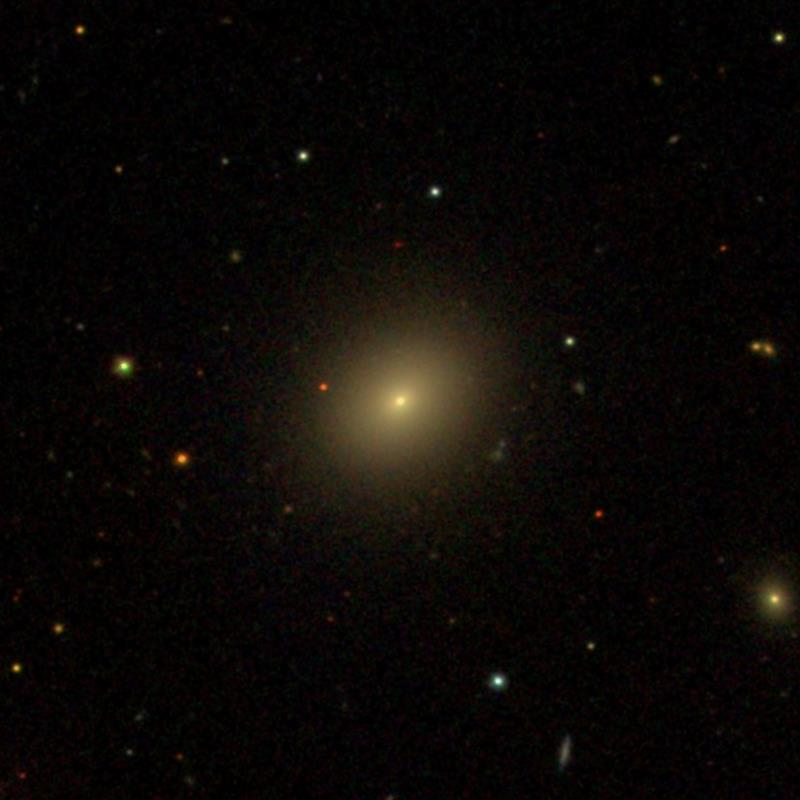
- SDSS image of NGC 5500

Observation data (J2000 epoch)
- Constellation: Boötes
- Right ascension: 14^{h} 10^{m} 15^{s}
- Declination: +48° 32′ 46″
- Redshift: 0.00637
- Heliocentric radial velocity: 1904 km/s
- Galactocentric velocity: 2014 km/s
- Distance: 90 ± 6 Mly (27.6 ± 1.9 Mpc)
- Apparent magnitude (V): 14.0
- Absolute magnitude (V): -18.2 (Note: Calculated from Galactocentric GSR Distance modulus)

Characteristics
- Type: E
- Apparent size (V): 1.1' x 0.9'

Other designations
- UGC 9070, MCG +08-26-008, PGC 50588

NGC 5500 is an elliptical galaxy in the constellation of Boötes, registered in New General Catalogue (NGC).

== Observation history ==
NGC 5500 was discovered by William Herschel on 12 May 1787. John Louis Emil Dreyer in the New General Catalogue, described the galaxy as "considerably faint, considerably small, irregularly round".
