= Carlton R. Pennypacker =

American astrophysicist

Carlton R. Pennypacker is an astrophysicist at the University of California, Berkeley and the Lawrence Berkeley Laboratory and is the principal investigator for the Hands On Universe project.

Dr. Pennypacker has been motivated by the power and potential of student and scientist partnerships when teachers and students started discovering supernovae in the Hands On Universe project. Some of his discoveries have been featured in the news media

He was awarded the Prix Jules Janssen of the French Astronomical Society in 2010.

Dr. Pennypacker has spent much of his career as a research astrophysicist, receiving his Ph.D. from Harvard in 1978. His principal research was the studying of supernovae and the building of techniques for their automated discovery. With Rich Muller, he co-founded the Berkeley Supernova Search, which later became the Supernova Cosmology Project. He shared the 2007 Gruber Prize in Cosmology and the 2015 Breakthrough Prize in Fundamental Physics for the Supernova Cosmology Project's discovery that the expansion of the universe is accelerating.
