= Mannheim Observatory =

Tower observatory in Mannheim, Baden-Württemberg, Germany

Coordinates: 49.486°N 8.460°E

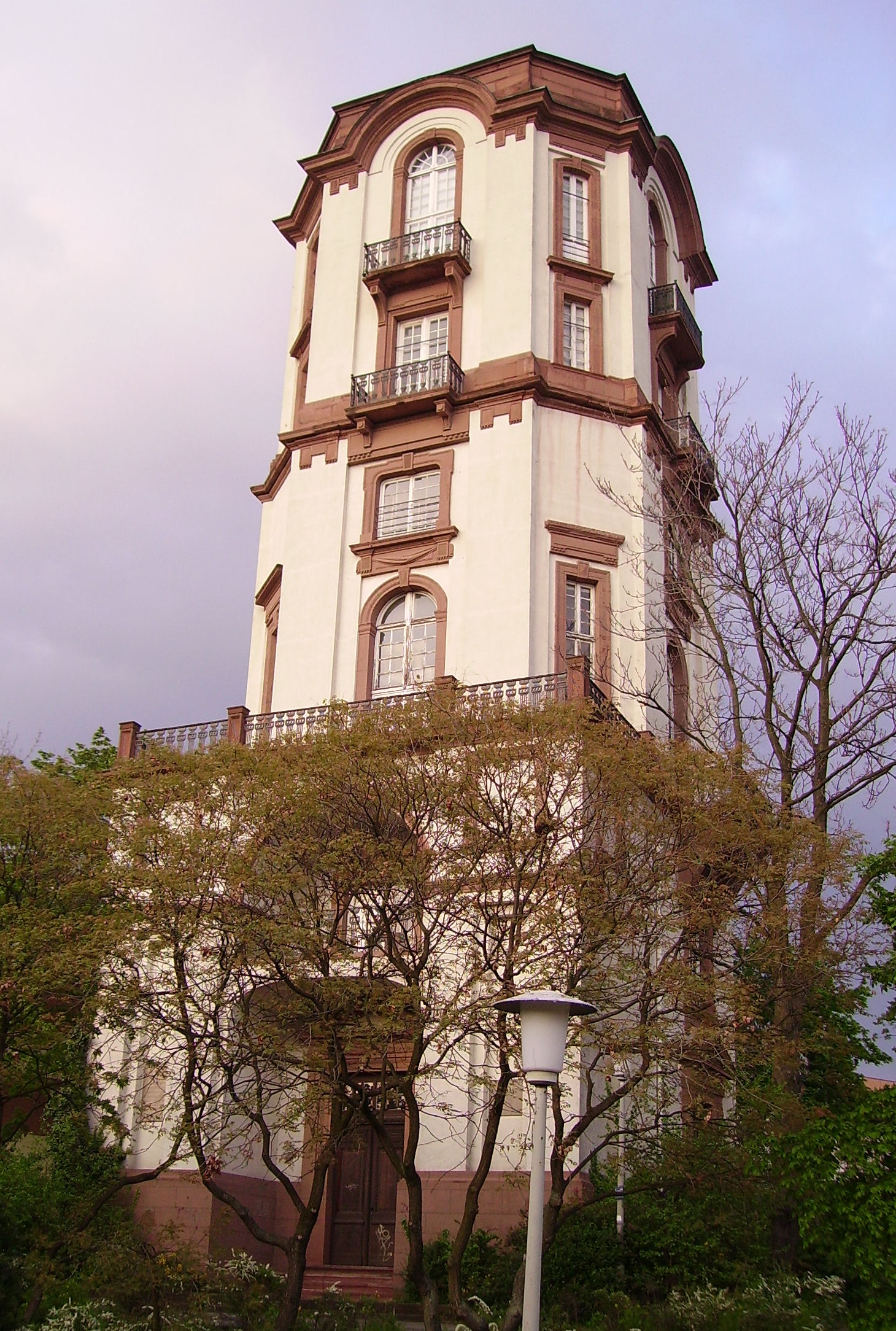
Tower of the Old Observatory, Mannheim, 2006

The Mannheim Observatory was a tower observatory built between 1772 and 1774 in Mannheim, Germany, which remained in operation until 1880. The observatory was transferred to Karlsruhe and finally in 1898, was established on the Königstuhl near Heidelberg where today's successor institution the State Observatory Heidelberg-Königstuhl is located.

The observatory tower is now owned by the city and was restored in 1905–1906, and after the Second World War. Since 1958, the tower houses studio flats.

== History ==
=== Schwetzingen ===
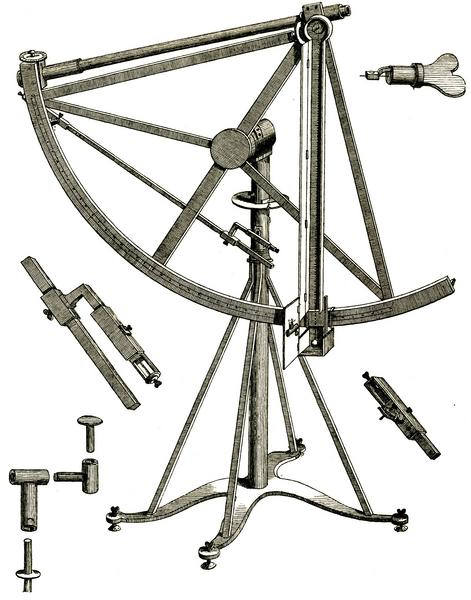
A quadrant by Canivet, as bought in Paris by Mayer

The Palatinate Elector Karl Theodor was a prince of the Age of Enlightenment. The French thinker Voltaire was a frequent visitor to his Court, the Elector made numerous reforms during his reign and founded scientific institutions. The Physics Institute, established in 1751 in Heidelberg, had as its Professor of Experimental Physics and Mathematics the Jesuit Father Christian Mayer.

In 1756 Mayer was sent to Paris to study the local water supply, he also studied at one of the centres of contemporary astronomy. He was given an Astronomical Quadrant, by the instrument maker, Canivet. In 1759, he observed the return of the comet predicted by Edmond Halley.

=== Transit of Venus 1761/1769 ===
Mayer observed the Transit of Venus across the Sun on 6 June 1761 from a temporary Observatory built of wood by Karl Theodor in the Orangery in the park of Schwetzingen Castle. The observations convinced the elector as early as July to begin work on an observatory building on the palace roof, which was inaugurated in 1764.

A few years later, Mayer travelled for a year to St. Petersburg and observed there, another Transit of Venus on 3 June 1769. The Schwetzinger observatory was not unused, however. Carl Theodor and a visitor, Prince Franz Xavier of Saxony, wished to observe the phenomenon, but were unsuccessful due to bad weather.

Mayer published his results from the two Venus Transits in St. Petersburg and calculated, with the help of his observations of the two transits, that the average Earth-Sun distance was 146.2 million kilometers, which is only three million kilometers less than the actual value, however, with a significant measurement uncertainty.

== The Palatinate Period ==
=== The Founding of the Mannheim Observatory ===
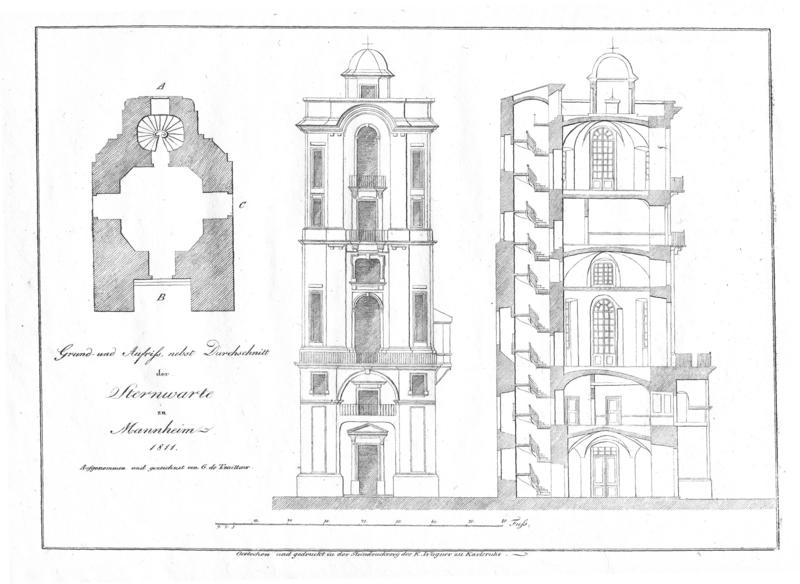
The Mannheim Observatory Tower

On New Year's Day 1771 Mayer finally presented a memorandum on the construction of an observatory to the Mannheim Court. In 1772 the Elector charged the Court Chamberlain with the construction of the observatory. In the same year the foundation stone of the tower next to Schloss Mannheim, in the vicinity of the Jesuit College was laid. In the following years, Mayer acquired numerous instruments, and with the help of books delivered from the Electoral Library made the Mannheim Observatory into an internationally known research facility.

In the visitors' book of the Mannheim observatory not only are there entries by many well-known colleagues, but also illustrious guests such as Wolfgang Amadeus Mozart, Benjamin Franklin, Envoy of the young United States, and even Arabic and other writings.

Mayer's astronomical work found its peak in the discovery of binary stars. The majority of the binary stars published in Bode's star chart of 1782 were observed by Mayer.

Elector Karl Theodor left the Palatinate in 1778, to govern Bavaria. Not least because of the absence of a personal patron prince, the history of the observatory after the death of Christian Mayer in 1783 was less happy.

=== Christian Mayer's Successors ===
The new Court Astronomer, the Jesuit Karl König, was transferred to Munich by the Elector Karl Theodor soon after he arrived in Mannheim, the next, the ex-Jesuit John Fischer, made so many enemies that in 1788 after only a year and a half he resigned. The Vincentian priest Peter Ungeschick was probably a better choice, but in 1790 he died on the return journey from studying in Paris. He was followed by Roger Barry, also a member of the Order of Vincentians.

Barry's initial successes were undone by the wars of the Napoleonic Era during which severe damage was inflicted on the Observatory. The tower was repeatedly shelled, instruments were destroyed and others damaged. Some disappeared in unexplained ways. Barry was imprisoned for a time by the French, although he was given the opportunity to observe a Transit of Mercury, but little else.

== The Baden Period ==
=== From the Napoleonic Wars to the German Revolution ===
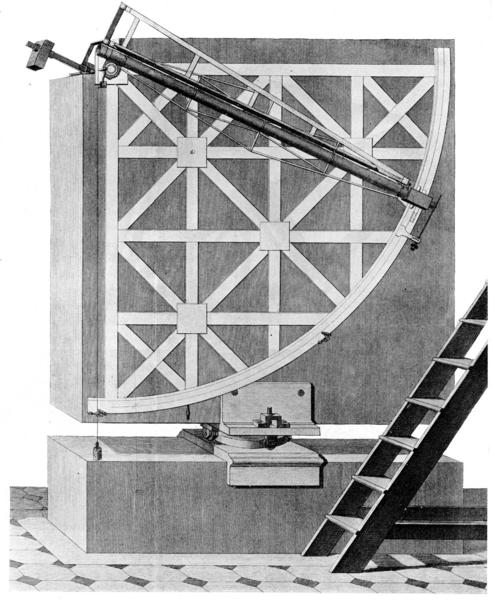
A 1775 John Bird Mural Quadrant was for many years the main instrument of the Mannheim Observatory.

After the 1806 war over the Grand Duchy of Baden's claims to areas of the Palatinate and thus the observatory, the Court Astronomer, Roger Barry, recommenced his observations, but fell ill in 1810 and the observatory remained unused until his death in 1813. His numerous observations with the Mural Quadrant made after 1800 remained unpublished by his successors, as they were not classified.

The running of the Mannheim Observatory by Catholic Orders was now over. In the years up to the Baden Revolution in 1848 the observatory declined. Famous astronomers were not retained, such as Heinrich Christian Schumacher (Director 1813–1815), founder of the oldest existing journal of astronomy, Astronomische Nachrichten, and of the Altona Observatory. Friedrich Wilhelm Struve, founder and first director of Pulkovo Observatory at St. Petersburg, despite being interested was deterred by clumsy personnel policy. From 1816 until his death in 1846 Bernhard Nicolai was Court Astronomer, being mainly dedicated to the orbits of comets. In his time, amongst other things, a three-stage refracting telescope was purchased from Fraunhofer, which was later used by the German expeditions of 1874 and 1882 to observe the Transit of Venus.

The instruments and the Observatory Tower itself were aging. Already mature plans for construction of a new observatory drawn up in the revolutionary period were no longer to be, and on 10 June 1850 it was decided to end the Institute by appointing no new Court Astronomer. In 1852 the Heidelberg professor Nell took over the unpaid supervision of the institute. In 1859 this modest institute planned renewal with the purchase of a six-stage telescope.

=== Move to Karlsruhe ===
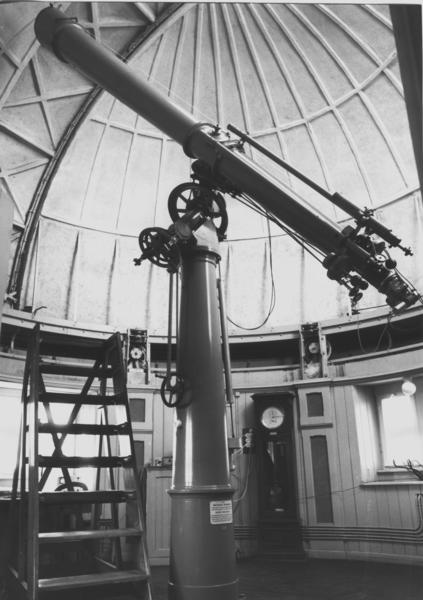
Six stage Steinheill refracting telescope installed at the Mannheim Observatory in 1859. Photo c. 1900–1920

In 1859 Eduard Schönfeld was appointed Director with a salary. The observatory equipment at his disposal was somewhat antiquated, his largest telescope being a small refractor of 73 lines aperture, but he selected a line of work to suit the instruments at his disposal, observing Nebulae, for which he soon made a name for himself, and variable stars and keeping a watch on comets and new planets. The results of his observations of nebulae are contained in two catalogues published in the Astronomische Beobachtungen der Grossherzoglichen Sternwarte zu Mannheim, 1st and 2nd parts (1862 and 1875), and those of his variable star observations appeared in the Jahresberichte des Mannheimer Vereins für Naturkunde, Nos. 32 and 39 (1866 and 1875). His work contributed significantly to the "Bonn Survey", a star catalogue still in use today. Moreover, he organized several astronomical meetings. At one such a meeting, 28 August 1863 in Heidelberg, the Astronomische Gesellschaft, the second oldest astronomical society after the Royal Astronomical Society. was founded. Schönfeld was on the founding board. Among many other activities, he was a member of the 1871 Advisory Commission in preparation for the 1874/82 Transits of Venus.

Schönfeld left for Bonn in 1875 and Karl Wilhelm Valentiner took over the Mannheim Directorship. The location of the Observatory in the middle of the town was no longer suitable. The Observatory was moved to a makeshift building in Karlsruhe in 1880 but no significant observations were made. Plans to build a permanent observatory in Karlsruhe did not become a reality, very much to Valentine's annoyance, even though the first telescopes and instruments were purchased.

During that time the desire for an observatory arose at the University of Heidelberg. The young Heidelberg astronomer Max Wolf had already built a private observatory in his parents' house in 1880. He believed firmly in the use of photography for observation and as a result he quickly made a name for himself in astronomy.

=== The Mountain Observatory at Heidelberg ===
In 1892 a deputation of Heidelberg professors, amongst them Max Wolf, petitioned the Grand Duke of Karlsruhe for a University research and teaching observatory. This was not financially feasible at that time for Baden which could do little more than construct the buildings, and could not afford the instruments for Wolf's specialisation of astrophotography. Wolf sought supporters for the purchase of new telescopes. The search proved to be very successful: Catherine Wolfe Bruce, the noted American philanthropist and patroness of science, donated $10,000 for a telescope, and this donation was followed by others. Finally, on the construction of an observatory it was granted that the Karlsruhe instruments should be transferred to Heidelberg.

On 20 June 1898, the "Großherzogliche Bergsternwarte" at Königstuhl (the present day Heidelberg Observatory) was ceremonially inaugurated by Frederick I, Grand Duke of Baden. The astronomical institute comprised two competing departments, the Astrophysics Department under Max Wolf, containing the instruments from his private observatory and the new foundation's instruments, and the Astrometry Department under Karl Wilhelm Valentiner, containing the Karlsruhe instruments. Valentiner was director of the Mannheim Observatory and had initiated the move to Karlsruhe. After Valentiner's retirement in 1909, both departments were amalgamated under the administration of Max Wolf. Wolf worked on many areas of astrophysics, he investigated the structure of the Milky Way, star spectroscopy and gas nebula, and searched intensively for Asteroids, of which he discovered more than 800. As an honorary citizen of Heidelberg, he was buried in the cemetery on the mountain in 1932.

After the Second World War, there was a new beginning for the Institute, now named the Königstuhl State Observatory (LSW). In 1983 the Mannheim instruments were donated to the State Museum of Technology and Industry in Mannheim, where some of them now form part of the permanent exhibition. The 1859 six-stage telescope was given to the city of Karlsruhe in 1957 for the establishment of the Public Astronomical Observatory of Karlsruhe, another instrument was given to the National Astronomical Observatory Heppenheim. The valuable book collection of the old library, the oldest of which dates back to 1476, was transferred to the Manuscript Department of the University Library.

== See also ==
- List of astronomical observatories
- List of Jesuit sites

== Sources ==
- Kai Budde: Sternwarte Mannheim. Die Geschichte der Mannheimer Sternwarte 1772–1880. Technik + Arbeit 12. Schriften des Landesmuseums für Technik und Arbeit in Mannheim. Ubstadt-Weiher, verlag regionalkultur 2006. ISBN 978-3-89735-473-9. 200 S. mit 76, meist farbigen Abb., fester Einband.
- Alexander Moutchnik, Forschung und Lehre in der zweiten Hälfte des 18. Jahrhunderts. Der Naturwissenschaftler und Universitätsprofessor Christian Mayer SJ (1719–1783) (Algorismus, Studien zur Geschichte der Mathematik und der Naturwissenschaften, Bd. 54), Erwin Rauner Verlag, Augsburg, 523 Seiten mit 8 Tafeln, 2006. ISBN 3-936905-16-9 http://www.erwin-rauner.de/algor/ign_publ.htm#H54 Inhaltsverzeichnis: http://www.ulb.tu-darmstadt.de/tocs/178692786.pdf
- Thomas Schoch: Die Sternwarte Mannheim und ihr Hofastronom Christian Mayer 1763–1783, 1986, Universität Mannheim, im Stadtarchiv
