= Adalbert Krueger =

German astronomer

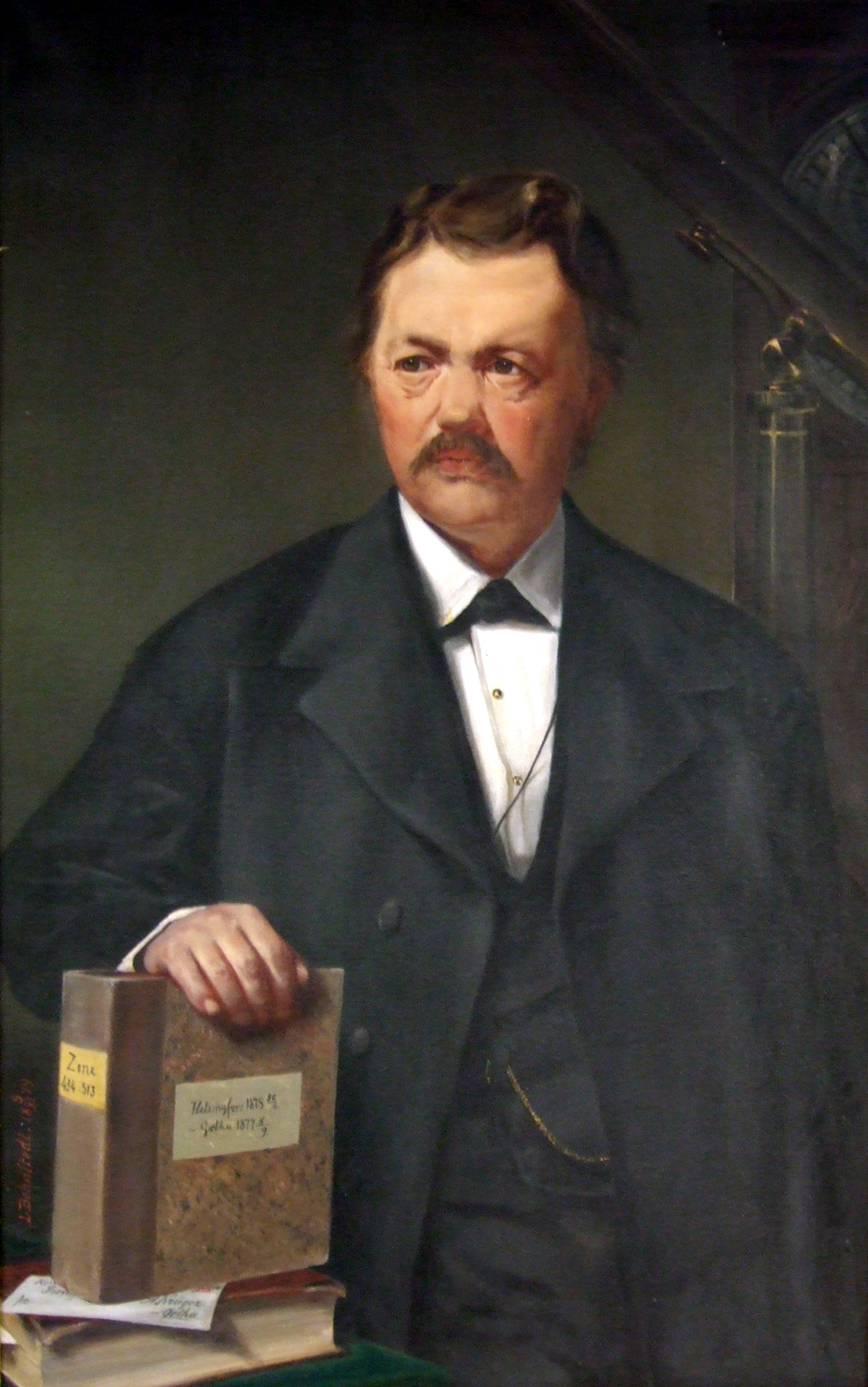
Artwork of Adalbert Krueger. The writing on the book refers to two of the observatories where he worked: Helsingfors (Helsinki, 1875) and Gotha (1877).

Karl Nikolaus Adalbert Krueger (9 December 1832 – 21 April 1896) was a German astronomer. Born in Marienburg, Prussia (now Malbork, Poland), he was editor of Astronomische Nachrichten from 1881 until his death.

Krueger died of a heart condition in Kiel at the age of 63.

== Life and work ==
In 1851, Krueger entered the University of Berlin where he studied mathematics and science. In 1853, showing a special preference for astronomical studies, Krueger moved to the University of Bonn and became an assistant to the astronomer Friedrich Wilhelm Argelander at the Bonn Observatory. Under Argelander's supervision he produced data for the comprehensive astrometric star catalogue known as the Bonner Durchmusterung, together with fellow student Eduard Schönfeld . Starting in Bonn, he undertook a lifelong study of the orbit of the minor planet Themis, whose perturbations by Jupiter eventually enabled him in 1873 (while at Helsinki Observatory) to determine the mass of the latter planet. He was awarded his doctorate by the University of Bonn in August 1854 for his dissertation titled "De ascensionibus rectis, a Flamsteedio quadrantis muralis ope observatis". In 1858 a heliometer previously used by Friedrich Winnecke came into his hands, and was successfully employed in a series of parallax determinations. Krueger was made Privatdozent in the University in 1860.

In 1862 Krueger was appointed Professor of Astronomy and Director of the Helsinki Observatory, working there for 14 years. At the time of his appointment he married Maria Wilhelmina Amalia, the eldest daughter of Friedrich Argelander. While in Helsinki, Krueger carefully determined the position of the stars of the Double Cluster in Perseus. The large proper motion of the star Groombridge 34 was first detected by him. He also performed observations of variable stars, several comets and minor planets, in addition to his theoretical work. After leaving Helsinki, Krueger directed the Gotha Observatory (1876-1880), succeeding the recently deceased Peter Andreas Hansen. In Gotha he continued to record data for the Astronomische Gesellschaft Katalog, an astrometric star catalogue.

Krueger was appointed as Director of the Royal Prussian Observatory in Kiel in 1880. In 1881, with the approval of the Astronomical Society (Astronomische Gesellschaft), Krueger became the editor of one of the foremost astronomical journals of the day, Astronomische Nachrichten; following the death of the former editor Christian Peters the year before. Following the death of Krueger in 1896, the editorship passed to his former assistant and son-in-law Heinrich Kreutz.
