= 1551 Argelander =

Main-belt asteroid

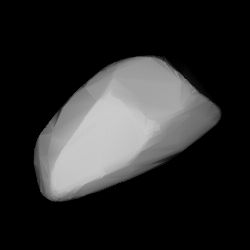
- Shape model of Argelander from its lightcurve

Discovery
- Discovered by: Y. Väisälä
- Discovery site: Turku Observatory
- Discovery date: 24 February 1938

Designations
- Named after: Friedrich Argelander (German astronomer)
- Alternative designations: 1938 DC_{1} · 1930 BL; 1940 XD · 1951 XG_{1} 1953 GD_{1} · 1957 KR; 1962 XP
- Minor planet category: main-belt · (inner) background

Orbital characteristics
- Epoch 27 April 2019 (JD 2458600.5)
- Uncertainty parameter 0
- Observation arc: 88.76 yr (32,418 d)
- Aphelion: 2.5539 AU
- Perihelion: 2.2350 AU
- Semi-major axis: 2.3944 AU
- Eccentricity: 0.0666
- Orbital period (sidereal): 3.71 yr (1,353 d)
- Mean anomaly: 147.41°
- Mean motion: 0° 15^{m} 57.6^{s} / day
- Inclination: 3.7615°
- Longitude of ascending node: 107.23°
- Argument of perihelion: 233.60°

Physical characteristics
- Mean diameter: 9.19±0.27 km 10.238±0.122 km 10.50±0.50 km 11.016±0.073 km
- Synodic rotation period: 4.063±0.006 h
- Geometric albedo: 0.1940; 0.217; 0.222; 0.302
- Spectral type: S (assumed)
- Absolute magnitude (H): 12.10; 12.20

1551 Argelander (provisional designation 1938 DC_{1}) is a background asteroid from the inner regions of the asteroid belt, approximately 10 kilometers (6.2 miles) in diameter. It was discovered on 24 February 1938, by Finnish astronomer Yrjö Väisälä at the Turku Observatory in southwest Finland. The likely S-type asteroid has a rotation period of 4.1 hours. It was named after German astronomer Friedrich Argelander.

== Orbit and classification ==
Argelander is a non-family asteroid from the main belt's background population. It orbits the Sun in the inner main-belt at a distance of 2.2–2.6 AU once every 3 years and 9 months (1,353 days; semi-major axis of 2.39 AU). Its orbit has an eccentricity of 0.07 and an inclination of 4° with respect to the ecliptic. The body's observation arc begins with its first observation as 1930 BL at Heidelberg Observatory in January 1930, or 8 years prior to its official discovery observation at Turku.

== Naming ==
This minor planet was named after Friedrich Wilhelm Argelander (1799–1875), author of the Bonner Durchmusterung and 19th-century head of the ancient observatory at Turku and Bonn (520). The official naming citation was published by the Minor Planet Center on 30 January 1964 (M.P.C. 2278). The lunar crater Argelander is also named after him.

== Physical characteristics ==
Argelander is an assumed S-type asteroid.

=== Rotation period and poles ===
In August 2017, a rotational lightcurve of Argelander was obtained from photometric observations at the Chilean Cerro Tololo Inter-American Observatory using the SARA South Telescope. Lightcurve analysis gave a rotation period of 4.063±0.006 hours and a brightness variation of 0.48 magnitude (U=2+). In January 2012, astronomers at the Palomar Transient Factory had also determined a period of 4.061±0.0023 with an amplitude of 0.41 magnitude (U=2).

A modeled lightcurve using photometric data from the Lowell Photometric Database was published in 2016. It gave a concurring period of 4.058350±0.000001 hours, as well as two spin axes at (3.0°, −81.0°) and (183.0°, −72.0°) in ecliptic coordinates (λ, β).

=== Diameter and albedo ===
According to the surveys carried out by the Japanese Akari satellite and the NEOWISE mission of NASA's Wide-field Infrared Survey Explorer, Argelander measures between 9.2 and 11.0 kilometers in diameter and its surface has an albedo between 0.19 and 0.30. The Collaborative Asteroid Lightcurve Link assumes a standard albedo for a stony asteroid of 0.20 and calculates a diameter of 9.60 kilometers based on an absolute magnitude of 12.45.
