= NGC 4383 =

Galaxy in the constellation Coma Berenices

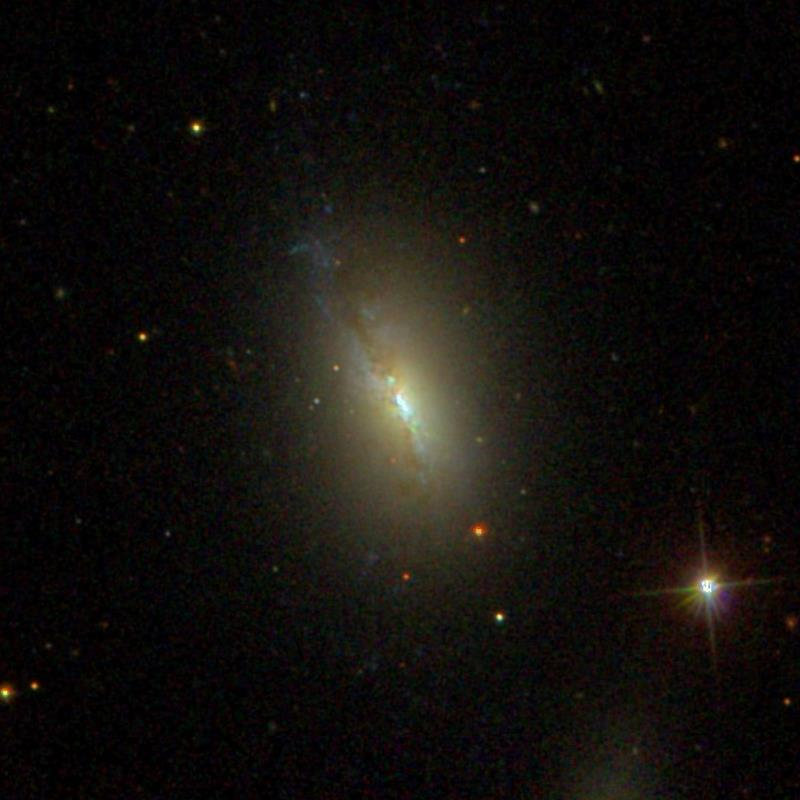

Observation data (J2000 epoch)
- Constellation: Coma Berenices
- Right ascension: 12^{h} 25^{m} 25.5^{s}
- Declination: 16° 28′ 12″
- Redshift: 0.005704 ± 0.000010
- Distance: 78 mly
- Group or cluster: Virgo Cluster
- Apparent magnitude (V): 12.12
- Apparent magnitude (B): 12.67

Characteristics
- Type: SA0/a

Other designations
- 2MASX J12252551+1628120, UGC 7507, LEDA 40516, MCG +03-32-030, Mrk 769, SDSS J122525.52+162812.4

NGC 4383 is a spiral galaxy located at a distance of around 78 million light years from Earth in the constellation of Coma Berenices. It was discovered on 23 May 1862 by Eduard Schönfeld. It is a member of the Virgo Cluster located around 1.25 mpc north-east from Messier 87, a supergiant elliptical galaxy. It is currently on its first infall into the cluster but it is not undergoing ram pressure stripping seen in jellyfish galaxies such as IC 3476 and CGCG 97-73.

== Characteristics ==
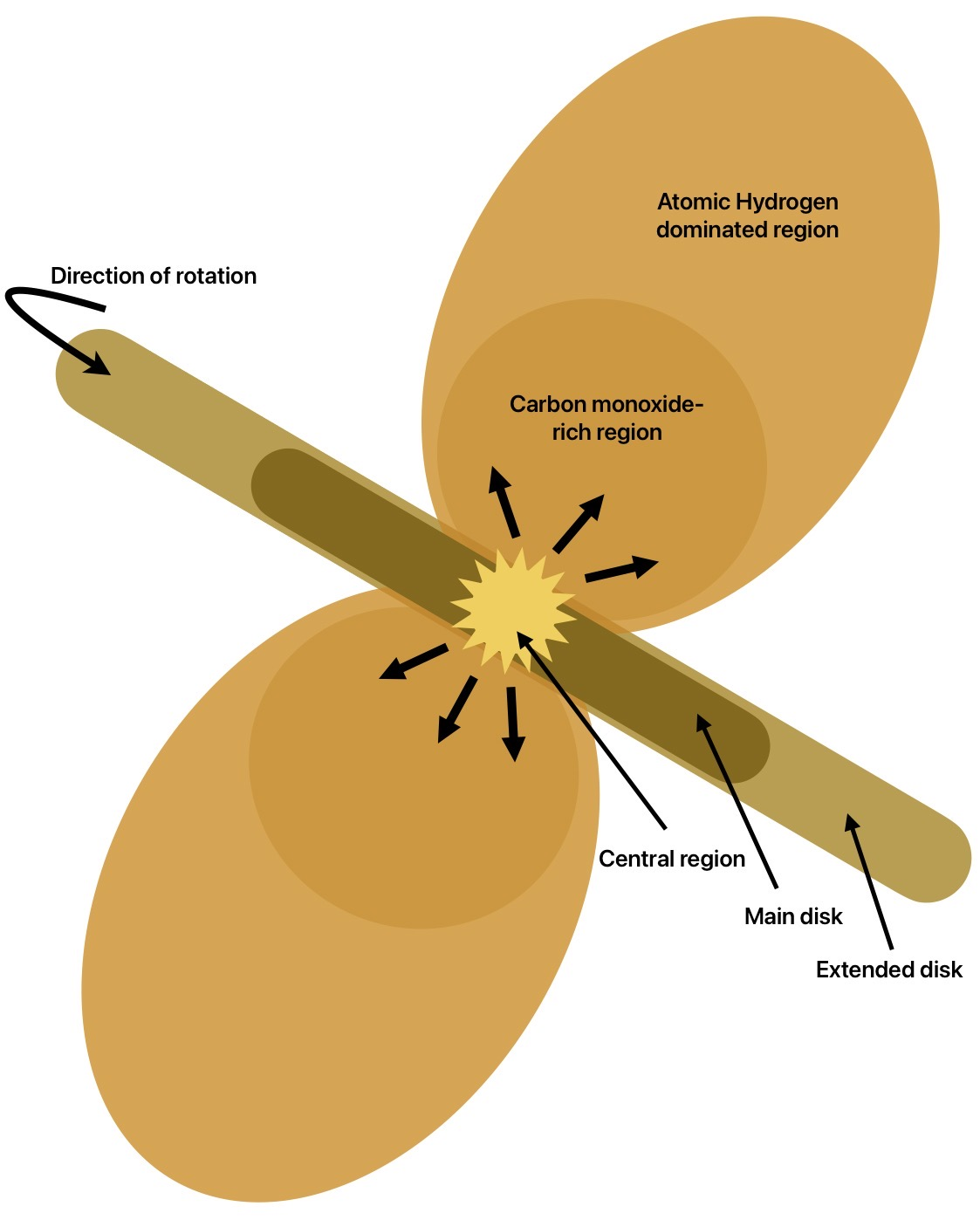
Diagram of NGC 4383 showing its structure inducing the bipolar flows and its extended disk. The bright yellow region represents the starburst region at the center of the galaxy.

It is a spiral galaxy with an intermediate mass but the morphological classification is uncertain. Classifications have placed NGC 4383 as a Sa galaxy with peculiar features to a S0 galaxy. It is relatively smooth and featureless. Imaging reveals a clear dust lane and a very bright central region where starburst occurs.

Located north of the galaxy are an extension of blue knots which are brighter in ultraviolet light showing evidence of star formation occurring outside the main body of NGC 4383. While it is not possible to rule out, these regions are likely not formed from ram-pressure processes but instead are just cold, high density regions of the H I disc forming H II regions. These regions are similar to the star formation regions in the tails of jellyfish galaxies, these similarities are strengthened by the infalling status of NGC 4383.

It is one of the most H I-rich disk galaxies in the Virgo clusters. It also has one of the most extended H I-disks in the Virgo cluster with it being extended over four times the optical size of the galaxy.

=== Outflow ===
The galaxy is host to massive bipolar outflows, similar to the outflows of Messier 82, of ionized gas that has a length of 6 kiloparsec (20,000 ly). It has a mass of 50 million solar masses with about 1.8 solar masses of mass per year is outflowed from the galaxy travelling at an average velocity of 210 km/s (some regions have a velocity of 300 km/s). The flow had a clumpy structure with a complex kinematics of ionized gas. These outflows are probably triggered by a strong burst of star-formation activity and possibly supernova explosions. The ejected material is enriched in heavy elements. While it is enriched in metals compared to the disk, it is not as enriched as the central region of the galaxy.

The outflows a molecular component such as clouds of Carbon monoxide (CO). However emissions for CO decline rapidly as it gets further form the galaxy with distances above a couple of kiloparsecs lacking a molecular component. Above the first kiloparsec, atomic Hydrogen dominates the cold components of the outflow.

==== History of research ====
These outflows were undiscovered as first glances of NGC 4383 shows it to be unremarkable being smooth and featureless. Perhaps the first ones to suggest that NGC 4383 had an outflow was (Koopmann & Kenney, 2004). They noted in their H α narrow-band image, and the H α image from the VESTIGE (Virgo Environmental Survey Tracing Ionised Gas Emission) clear bipolar filimentary structures. Imaging surveys reveal the more unique features of NGC 4383 such as the bipolar outflows which were studied using the Multi-unit spectroscopic explorer (MUSE) at the Very Large Telescope (VLT). It was also studied using MAUVE (Multiphase Astrophysics to Unveil the Virgo Environment).
