= Heinrich Kreutz =

German astronomer (1854–1907)

Heinrich Carl Friedrich Kreutz
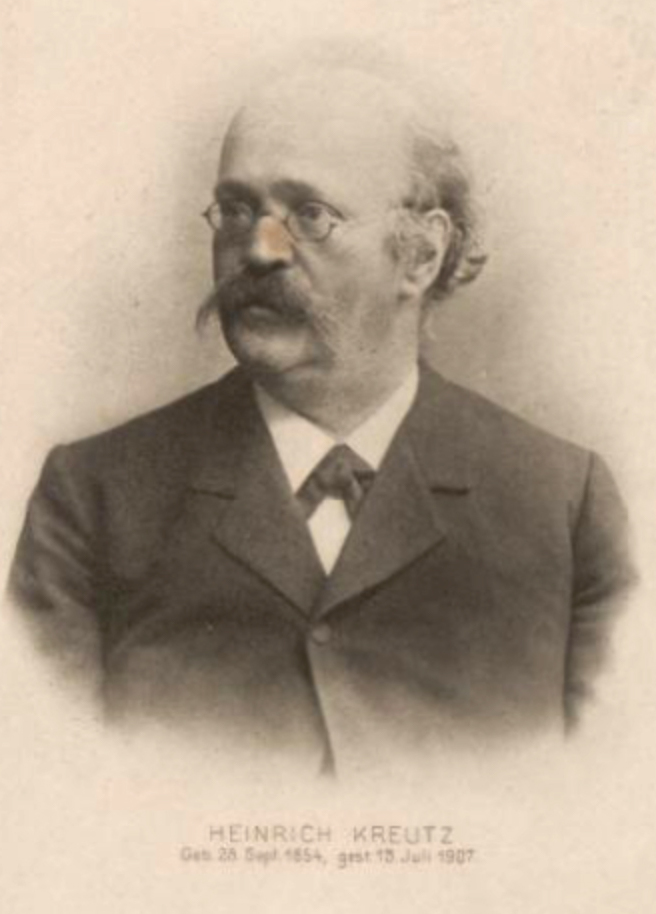
- Born: September 8, 1854; Siegen, Germany
- Died: July 13, 1907 (aged 52); Kiel, Germany
- Education: University of Bonn
- Known for: Kreutz sungrazer
- Scientific career
- Institutions: Kiel Observatory, University of Kiel
- Thesis: Untersuchungen über die Bahn des grossen Kometen 1861 II (1880)
- Academic advisors: Eduard Schönfeld and Adalbert Krueger

Heinrich Carl Friedrich Kreutz (September 8, 1854 – July 13, 1907) was a German astronomer, most notable for his studies of the orbits of several sungrazing comets, which revealed that they were all related objects, produced when a very large Sun-grazing comet fragmented several hundred years previously. The group is now known as the Kreutz sungrazers, and has produced some of the brightest comets ever seen, including X/1106 C1 and Comet Ikeya–Seki. The source of the group may have been the Great Comet of 371 BC.

Kreutz was born in Siegen in 1854, and obtained his PhD at the University of Bonn in 1880 on the orbit of comet C/1861 J1, working under Eduard Schönfeld and Adalbert Krueger. In 1880, he spent some time in Vienna, working with Edmund Weiss and Theodor von Oppolzer. In 1882 started to work as a computer at Recheninstitut in Berlin. Next year he moved to Kiel, following his adviser Krueger, who became the director of Kiel Observatory, and started to work as a computer at the observatory. In 1889 he became an assistant professor, and two years later a associate professor of astronomy at the University of Kiel. After Krueger's death in 1896, Kreutz became the editor of the Astronomische Nachrichten, the leading astronomical journal of the time, and held the position until his death in 1907.

The minor planet 3635 Kreutz, discovered by Luboš Kohoutek in 1981, was named after him.

== Selected publications ==
- 1901: Untersuchungen über das System der Cometen 1843I, 1880I and 1882II
