= 3635 Kreutz =

Mars-crossing asteroid

Discovery
- Discovered by: L. Kohoutek
- Discovery site: Calar Alto Obs.
- Discovery date: 21 November 1981

Designations
- Named after: Heinrich Kreutz (German astronomer)
- Alternative designations: 1981 WO_{1}
- Minor planet category: Mars-crosser · Hungaria

Orbital characteristics
- Epoch 4 September 2017 (JD 2458000.5)
- Uncertainty parameter 0
- Observation arc: 34.61 yr (12,641 days)
- Aphelion: 1.9461 AU
- Perihelion: 1.6434 AU
- Semi-major axis: 1.7947 AU
- Eccentricity: 0.0843
- Orbital period (sidereal): 2.40 yr (878 days)
- Mean anomaly: 273.37°
- Mean motion: 0° 24^{m} 35.64^{s} / day
- Inclination: 19.223°
- Longitude of ascending node: 235.35°
- Argument of perihelion: 249.10°

Physical characteristics
- Dimensions: 2.94±0.59 km 3.41 km (calculated)
- Synodic rotation period: 39±2 h (dated); 280±5 h (Note: Lightcurve plot of (3635) Kreutz by Brian D. Warner at the Palmer Divide Observatory (2012). Rotation period 280±5 hours with a brightness amplitude of 0.25±0.03 mag. Summary figures at the LCDB)
- Geometric albedo: 0.20 (assumed); 0.269±0.108
- Spectral type: SMASS = S
- Absolute magnitude (H): 14.7

3635 Kreutz, provisional designation 1981 WO_{1}, is a slowly rotating Hungaria asteroid and Mars-crosser from the innermost regions of the asteroid belt, approximately 3 kilometers in diameter. It was discovered on 21 November 1981, by Czech astronomer Luboš Kohoutek at the Calar Alto Observatory in southern Spain.

== Orbit and classification ==
Kreutz is a Mars-crossing asteroid, a member of a dynamically unstable group between the main belt and the near-Earth populations, crossing the orbit of Mars at 1.666 AU. It has also been classified as a member of the dynamical Hungaria group.

It orbits the Sun at a distance of 1.6–1.9 AU once every 2 years and 5 months (878 days). Its orbit has an eccentricity of 0.08 and an inclination of 19° with respect to the ecliptic. The body's observation arc begins with its official discovery observation as no precoveries were taken, and no prior identifications were made.

== Physical characteristics ==
In the SMASS classification, Kreutz is characterized as a common stony S-type asteroid.

=== Slow rotator ===
In November 2012, a rotational lightcurve of Kreutz was obtained from photometric observations by American astronomer Brian Warner at his Palmer Divide Observatory (716) in Colorado. Lightcurve analysis gave a rotation period of 280±5 hours with a brightness variation of 0.25 magnitude (U=2+), superseding a previous result that gave 39 hours (U=2).

As most asteroids have a much shorter rotation period of 2 to 20 hours, Kreutz'es period of 280 hours is among the Top 200 slow rotators known to exist.

=== Diameter and albedo ===
According to the survey carried out by the NEOWISE mission of NASA's Wide-field Infrared Survey Explorer, Kreutz measures 2.94 kilometers in diameter and its surface has an albedo of 0.269, while the Collaborative Asteroid Lightcurve Link assumes a standard albedo for stony asteroids of 0.20 and calculates a diameter of 3.41 kilometers using an absolute magnitude of 14.7.

With a mean-diameter of approximately 3 kilometers, Kreutz is one of the smaller mid-sized Mars-crossing asteroids. It is assumed that there are up to 10 thousand Mars-crossers larger than 1 kilometer. The largest members of this dynamical group are 132 Aethra, 323 Brucia, 2204 Lyyli and 512 Taurinensis, which measure between 43 and 25 kilometers in diameter.

== Naming ==
This minor planet was named after Heinrich Kreutz (1854–1907), German astronomer at the Kiel Observatory and editor of the journal Astronomische Nachrichten, known for his study of bright sungrazing comets. The family of Kreutz sungrazers, fragments of a parent comet that broke up several centuries ago, is also named after him. The official naming citation was published by the Minor Planet Center on 26 November 2004 (M.P.C. 53173).
