= Modřice =

- Town
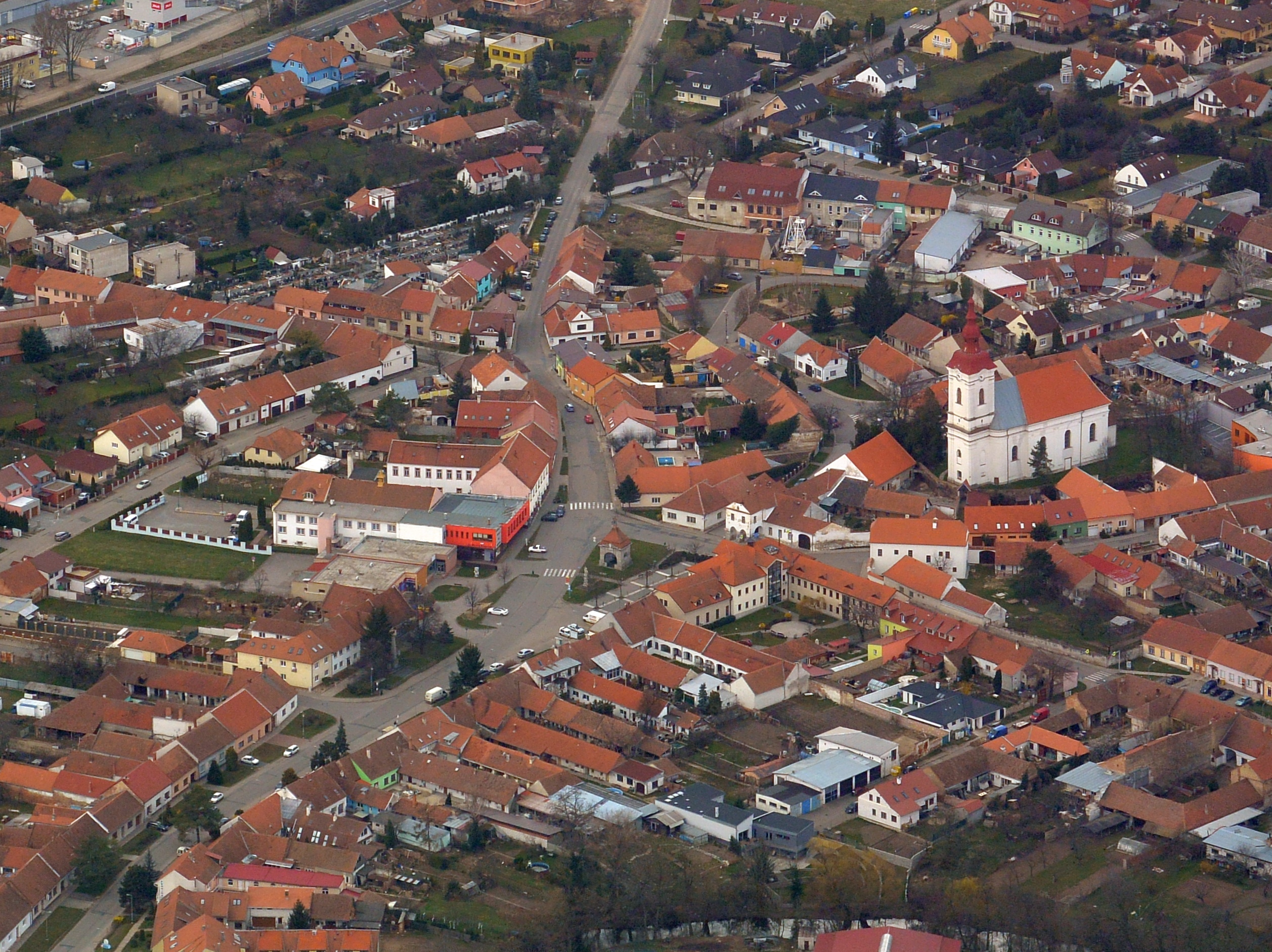
- Aerial view of the town centre

- Flag Coat of arms

- Location in the Czech Republic
- Coordinates: 49°7′41″N 16°36′52″E
- Country: Czech Republic
- Region: South Moravian
- District: Brno-Country
- First mentioned: 1141

Government
  - Mayor: Libor Procházka

Area
  - Total: 10.05 km^{2} (3.88 sq mi)
- Elevation: 204 m (669 ft)

Population (2026-01-01)
  - Total: 5,673
  - Density: 564.5/km^{2} (1,462/sq mi)
- Time zone: UTC+1 (CET)
  - Summer (DST): UTC+2 (CEST)
- Postal code: 664 42
- Website: www.mesto-modrice.cz

Modřice (Czech pronunciation: [ˈmodr̝ɪtsɛ]; German: Mödritz) is a town in Brno-Country District in the South Moravian Region of the Czech Republic. It has about 5,700 inhabitants. The town is located on the Svratka River in the Dyje–Svratka Valley.

Modřice existed already in the 12th century, but it became a town only in 1994. The main landmark of the town is the Church of Saint Gotthard.

== Geography ==
Modřice is located about 6 kilometres (4 mi) south of Brno. It lies in the Dyje–Svratka Valley. The highest point is at 342 m (1,122 ft) above sea level. The town is situated on the right bank of the Svratka River.

== History ==
The first written mention of Modřice is from 1141. There used to be a castle owned by the Olomouc bishops. In the 13th century, Germanic settlers came and mixed with the original Slavic population.

In the first half of the 20th century, Germans formed majority of the population. After World War II, the German inhabitants were expelled and the municipality was resettled by Czechs. Modřice became a town in 1994.

== Demographics ==
Historical population

Year	Pop.	±%
1869	1,619	—
1880	1,834	+13.3%
1890	1,890	+3.1%
1900	2,014	+6.6%
1910	2,205	+9.5%

Year	Pop.	±%
1921	2,237	+1.5%
1930	2,509	+12.2%
1950	2,423	−3.4%
1961	2,787	+15.0%
1970	3,381	+21.3%

Year	Pop.	±%
1980	4,115	+21.7%
1991	3,484	−15.3%
2001	3,504	+0.6%
2011	4,845	+38.3%
2021	5,487	+13.3%

Source: Censuses

== Transport ==
The D2 motorway from Brno to Břeclav runs through the eastern part of the municipal territory. The I/52 road (an unfinished section of the D52 motorway, part of the European route E461) runs through the town proper.

== Sights ==
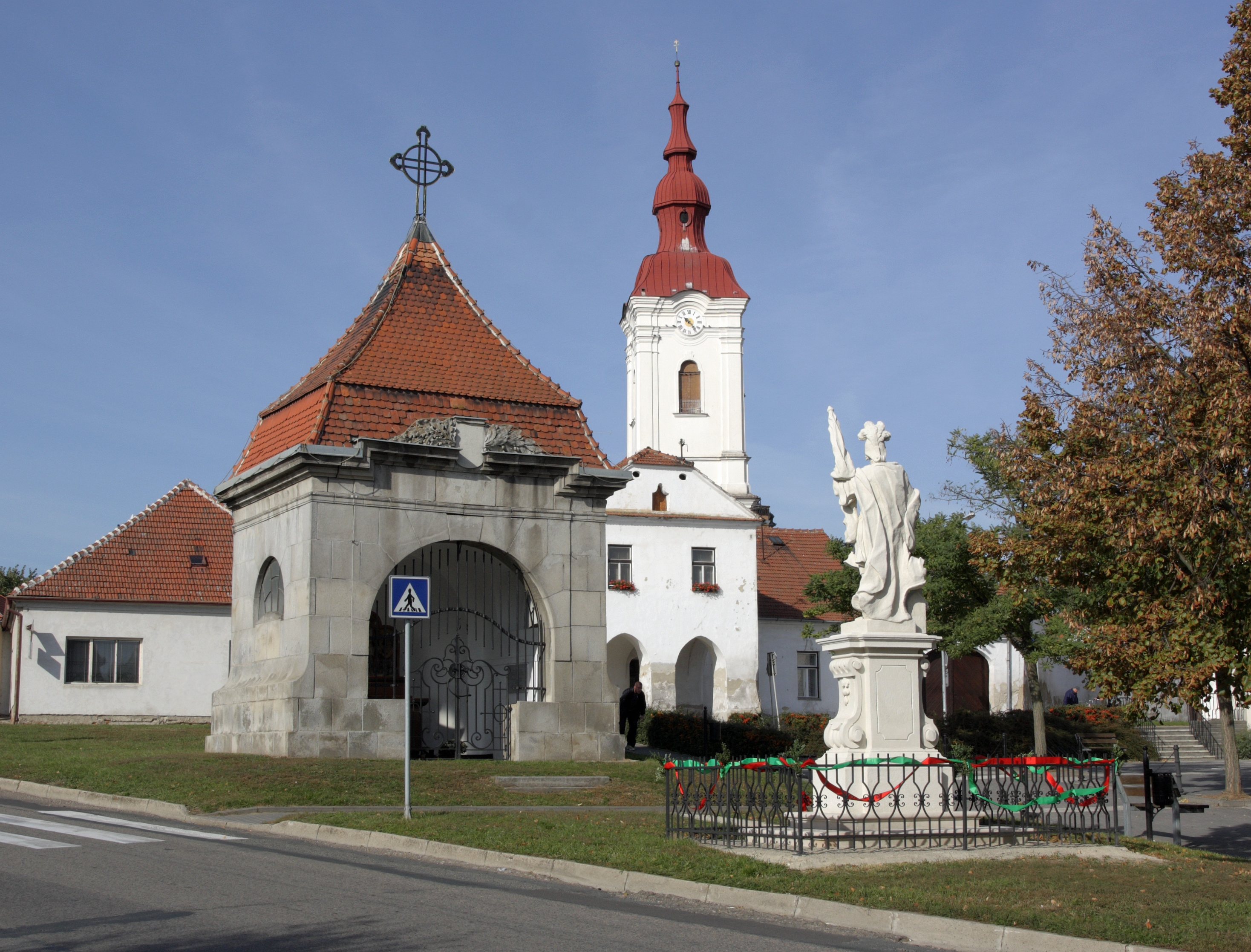
The square Náměstí Svobody

The main landmark of Modřice is the Church of Saint Gotthard. The original Romanesque structure was completely rebuilt in the 1780s. It has preserved Romanesque core, a Renaissance portal and a late Baroque tower.

== Notable people ==
- Christian Mayer (1719–1783), German astronomer
- Leander Czerny (1859–1944), Austrian entomologist
- Jiří Ventruba (1950–2021), neurosurgeon and politician
