= Friedrich Wilhelm Argelander =

German astronomer (1799–1875)

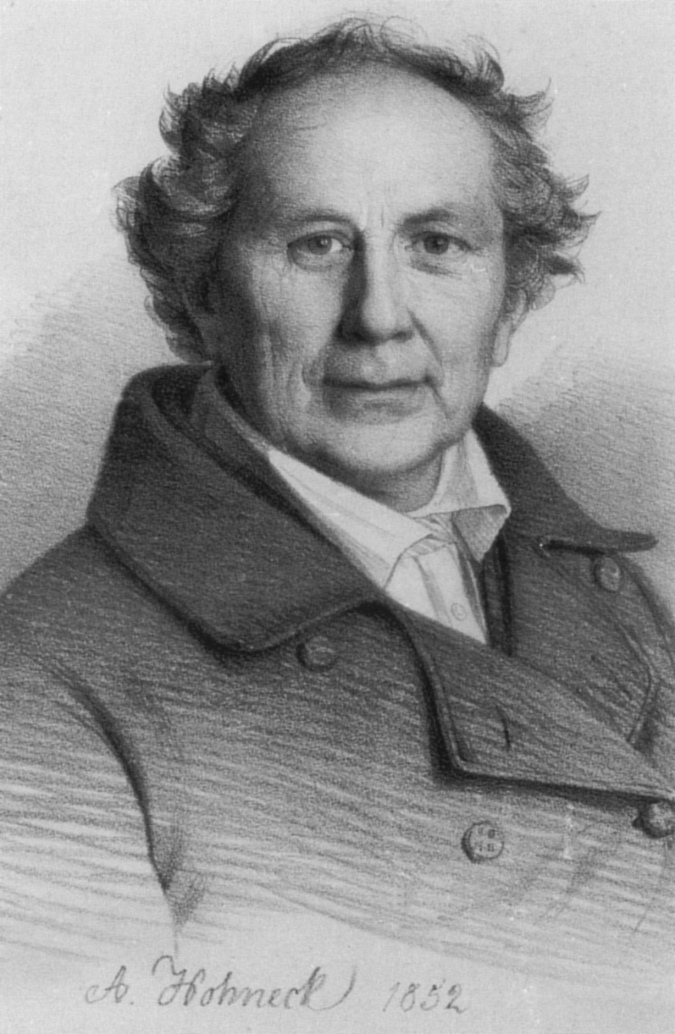
- Friedrich Wilhelm Argelander, 1852
- Born: 22 March 1799; Memel, Kingdom of Prussia
- Died: 17 February 1875 (aged 75); Bonn, Kingdom of Prussia, German Empire
- Citizenship: Prussia
- Education: University of Königsberg
- Awards: Gold Medal of the Royal Astronomical Society (1863)
- Scientific career
- Fields: Astronomy
- Doctoral advisor: Friedrich Wilhelm Bessel

Friedrich Wilhelm August Argelander (22 March 1799 – 17 February 1875) was a German astronomer. He is known for his determinations of stellar brightnesses, positions, and distances.

== Life and work ==
Argelander was born in Memel in the Kingdom of Prussia (now Klaipėda in Lithuania), the son of a father of Finnish descent, Johann Gottlieb Argelander, and German (Prussian) mother, Dorothea Wilhelmina Grünhagen. He studied with Friedrich Bessel, whose assistant he became in 1820, and obtained his Ph.D. in 1822 at University of Königsberg. From 1823 until 1837, Argelander was the head of the Finnish observatory, first in Turku and then in Helsinki. He then moved to Bonn, Germany. There he designed and built a new observatory at the University of Bonn with funding approved directly by King Frederick William IV whom Argelander had become friends with in his childhood. This lifelong friendship had started when the then crown prince temporarily lived in Argelander's parents house after the Prussian royal family fled to Memel after the Battle of Jena–Auerstedt during the Napoleonic Wars.

Argelander developed practical methods for measuring stellar positions and magnitudes, contributing to the advancement of modern observational astronomy. He also measured stellar distances using heliometers. His work, together with that of his collaborators, included extensive star cataloguing and research on variable stars, made possible through the systematic use of newly developed observational techniques.

Argelander was the first astronomer to begin a careful study of variable stars. Only a handful were known when he began, and he was responsible for introducing the modern system of identifying them. He also made a rough determination of the direction in which the Sun was moving.

In 1842, he discovered that Groombridge 1830 had a very high proper motion. For many decades its proper motion was the highest known; today it still occupies third place. For a time, it was known as Argelander's Star.

Together with Adalbert Krüger and Eduard Schönfeld, Argelander was responsible for the star catalogue known as the Bonner Durchmusterung, published between 1859 and 1862, which gave the positions and brightness of more than 324,000 stars, although it did not cover much of the southern half of the sky. This was the last star map to be published without the use of photography.

In 1863, Argelander helped lead in the founding of an international organization of astronomers named the Astronomische Gesellschaft.

== Honors and legacy ==
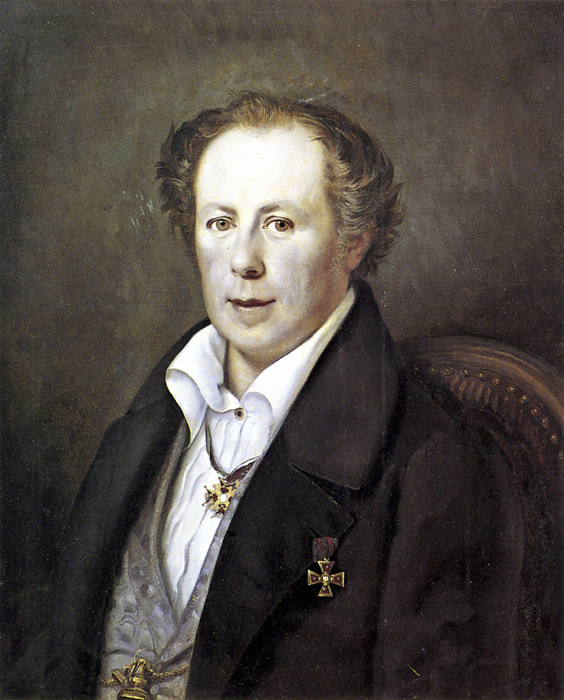
Portrait by Carl Peter Mazer (1837)

- Elected Honorary Member of the Finnish Society of Sciences and Letters in 1845.
- Elected a foreign member of the Royal Swedish Academy of Sciences in 1846.
- Elected a Foreign Honorary Member of the American Academy of Arts and Sciences in 1855.
- Elected Member of the Royal Academy of Science, Letters and Fine Arts of Belgium.
- Was awarded the Gold Medal of the Royal Astronomical Society in 1863.
- Orden Pour le Mérite für Wissenschaften und Künste (Order Pour le Mérite for Arts and Sciences - Civil class) in 1874.
- The three astronomical institutes of the Bonn University were merged and renamed as the Argelander-Institut für Astronomie in 2006.
- The crater Argelander on the Moon and the asteroid 1551 Argelander are named for him.

== See also ==
- Variable star designation

== References and notes ==
Citations
