= Vogel (lunar crater) =

Crater on the Moon

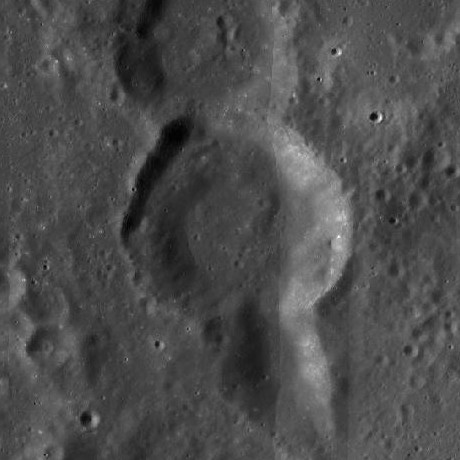
- LRO WAC mosaic
- Coordinates: 15.1°S 5.9°E
- Diameter: 27 km
- Depth: 2.8 km
- Colongitude: 354° at sunrise
- Eponym: Hermann C. Vogel

Vogel is a small lunar impact crater located to the southeast of Albategnius. It was named after the German astronomer Hermann Carl Vogel. It is the smallest member of a trio of craters that increase in size from north to south, consisting of Vogel, Argelander and Airy. To the west is the remnant of the crater Parrot.

Both the northern and southern ends of Vogel's rim are interrupted by smaller craters. Vogel B to the north is overlain in turn along its northern rim by an even smaller crater, thus forming a cluster of interconnected craters with Vogel being the largest. The rim of Vogel is otherwise relatively intact and not significantly worn.

== Satellite craters ==
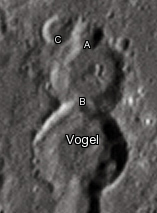
Vogel crater and its satellite craters taken from Earth in 2012 at the University of Hertfordshire's Bayfordbury Observatory with the telescopes Meade LX200 14" and Lumenera Skynyx 2-1

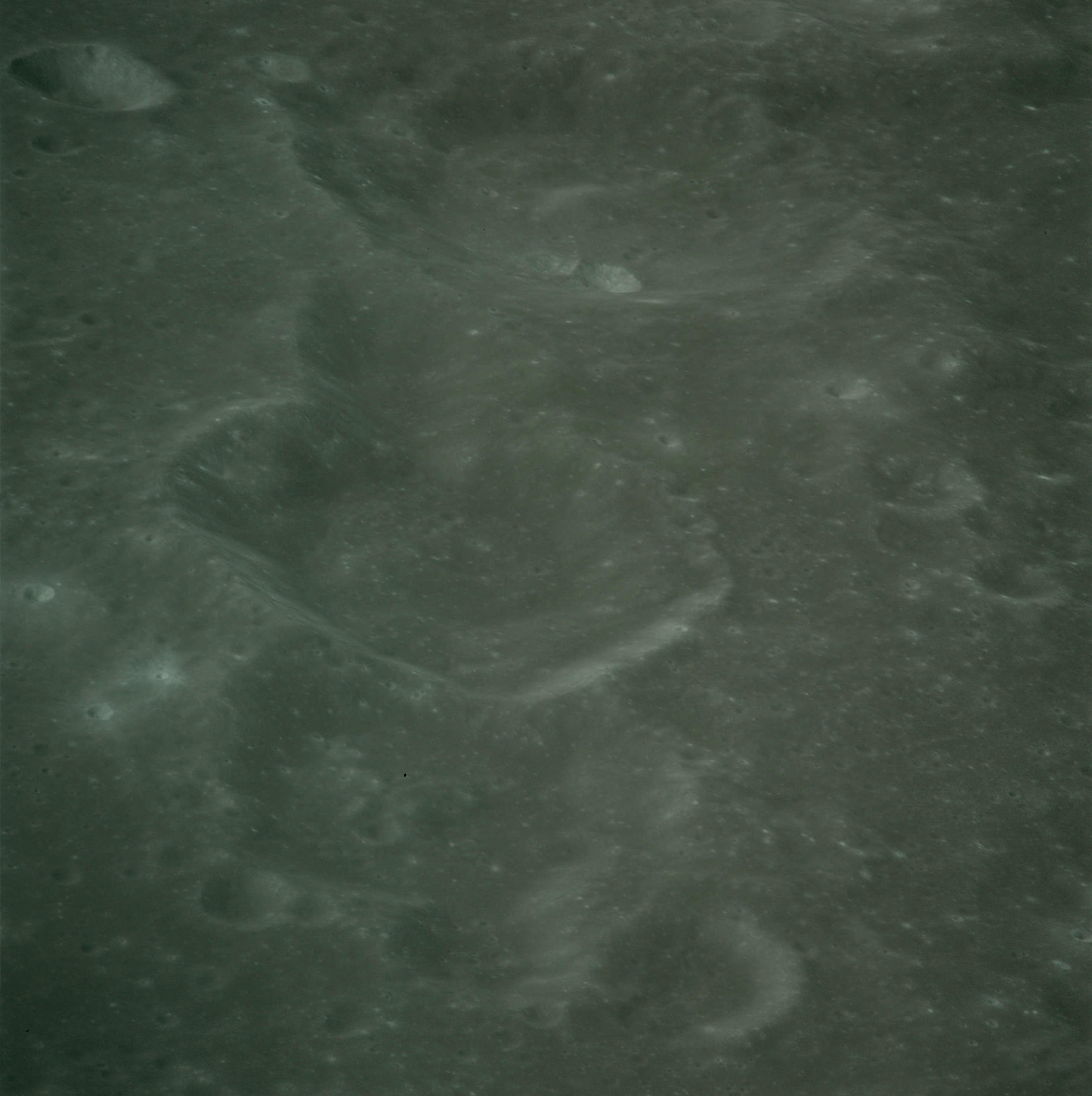
Oblique view Vogel (center) and Argelander (top), facing south, from Apollo 16

By convention these features are identified on lunar maps by placing the letter on the side of the crater midpoint that is closest to Vogel.

Vogel	Latitude	Longitude	Diameter
A	14.1° S	5.6° E	9 km
B	14.4° S	5.7° E	22 km
C	14.1° S	5.3° E	10 km
