= Karl Wilhelm Valentiner =

German astronomer

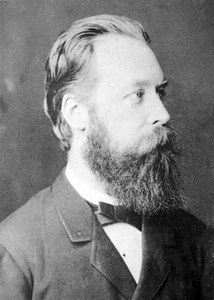
- Born: 22 February 1845; Eckernförde, Duchy of Schleswig (now Germany)
- Died: 1 April 1931 (aged 86); Berlebeck, Germany

Karl Wilhelm Valentiner (22 February 1845 in Eckernförde – 1 April 1931) was a German astronomer.

== Life ==
In 1874, Wilhelm Valentiner led a successful German expedition to Zhifu (China) to observe a solar eclipse. 1875, He took over the directorship of the Mannheim Observatory in 1875. Since the observing conditions in the Mannheim city centre were deteriorating, Grand Duke Frederick I of Baden approved Valentiner's request to relocate the observatory in Karlsruhe in 1880. The telescope, however, was located in a makeshift hut in Karlsruhe Nymphenburg Park. Much to the annoyance of Valentiner, now appointed Professor of the University of Karlsruhe, no new observatory was built. He decided to apply for a position at Königstuhl near Heidelberg.

After the establishment of the "Grand Duchy Mountain Observatory" (today's Heidelberg-Königstuhl State Observatory) in the year 1898 Valentiner was placed over the Department of Astrometry, which stood in competition with the Astrophysics Department under Max Wolf. When Valentiner retired in 1909 the two departments were merged under the direction of Wolf.

== Works ==
- Astronomische Bilder, Leipzig, 1881
- Handwörterbuch der Astronomie, Breslau, 1897–1902 (online: Band 1, Band 2, Band 3, Teil 1, Band 3, Teil 2, Band 4)
