= Argelander (crater) =

Crater on the Moon

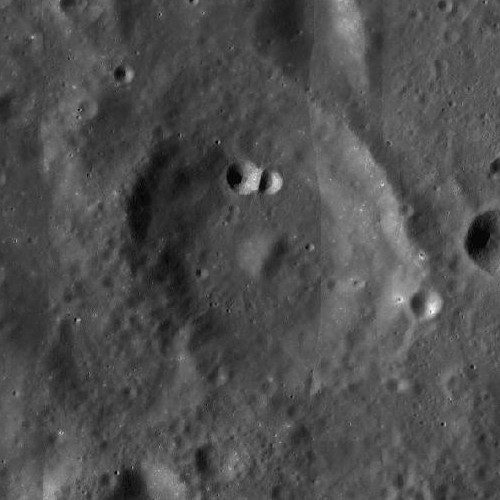
- LRO WAC mosaic
- Coordinates: 16.5°S 5.8°E
- Diameter: 33.72 km (20.95 mi)
- Depth: 3.0 km
- Colongitude: 354° at sunrise
- Eponym: Friedrich Argelander

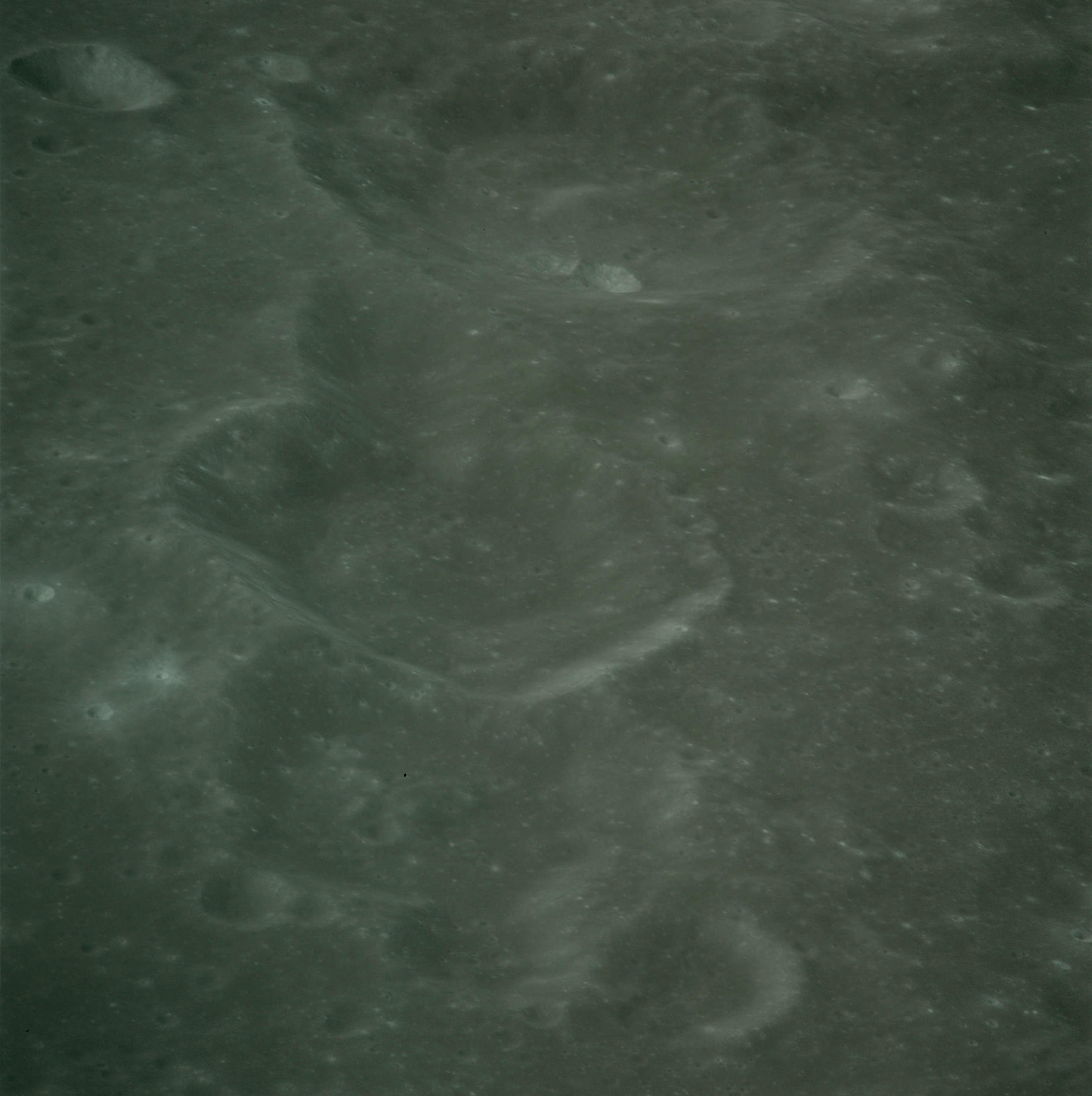
Oblique view Vogel (center) and Argelander (top), facing south, from Apollo 16

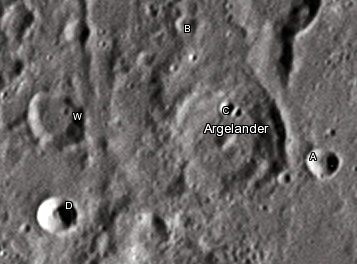
Argelander crater and its satellite craters taken from Earth in 2012 at the University of Hertfordshire's Bayfordbury Observatory with the telescopes Meade LX200 14" and Lumenera Skynyx 2-1

Argelander is a lunar impact crater that is located in the south-central highlands of the Moon. It lies in the midpoint between the smaller crater Vogel in the north and the larger Airy to the south. To the northwest is the worn remnant of Parrot. Just to the west is a shallow cleft in the surface that follows a course to the north-northwest, intersecting the southeast rim of Parrot.

The rim of Argelander is somewhat worn and indented, although less distorted than Airy to the south. The bottom is relatively flat and there is a small central rise. There is a curved depression in the surface following the western rim, giving the wall a rampart on that side.

This crater is named after the German astronomer Friedrich Argelander (1799-1875). It was formally adopted by the International Astronomical Union in 1935. The incorporation of this name into lunar nomenclature is attributed to English amateur selenographers William R. Birt and John Lee in the nineteenth century.

== Swirl pattern west of Argelander D ==
Immediately west of bright satellite crater Argelander D, in and near Rand McNally's Loró Basin, a swirl pattern related to lunar swirls is discernible before, during, and after full moon. This swirl pattern is also noticeable on the photographic version of chart LAC 95 (page 190) in The Clementine Atlas of the Moon (Ben Bussey / Paul D. Spudis).

== Satellite craters ==
By convention these features are identified on lunar maps by placing the letter on the side of the crater midpoint that is closest to Argelander.

Argelander	Latitude	Longitude	Diameter
A	16.5° S	6.8° E	9 km
B	15.5° S	5.1° E	6 km
C	16.3° S	5.7° E	4 km
D	17.6° S	4.4° E	11 km
W	16.7° S	4.2° E	19 km
