= Airy (lunar crater) =

Crater on the Moon

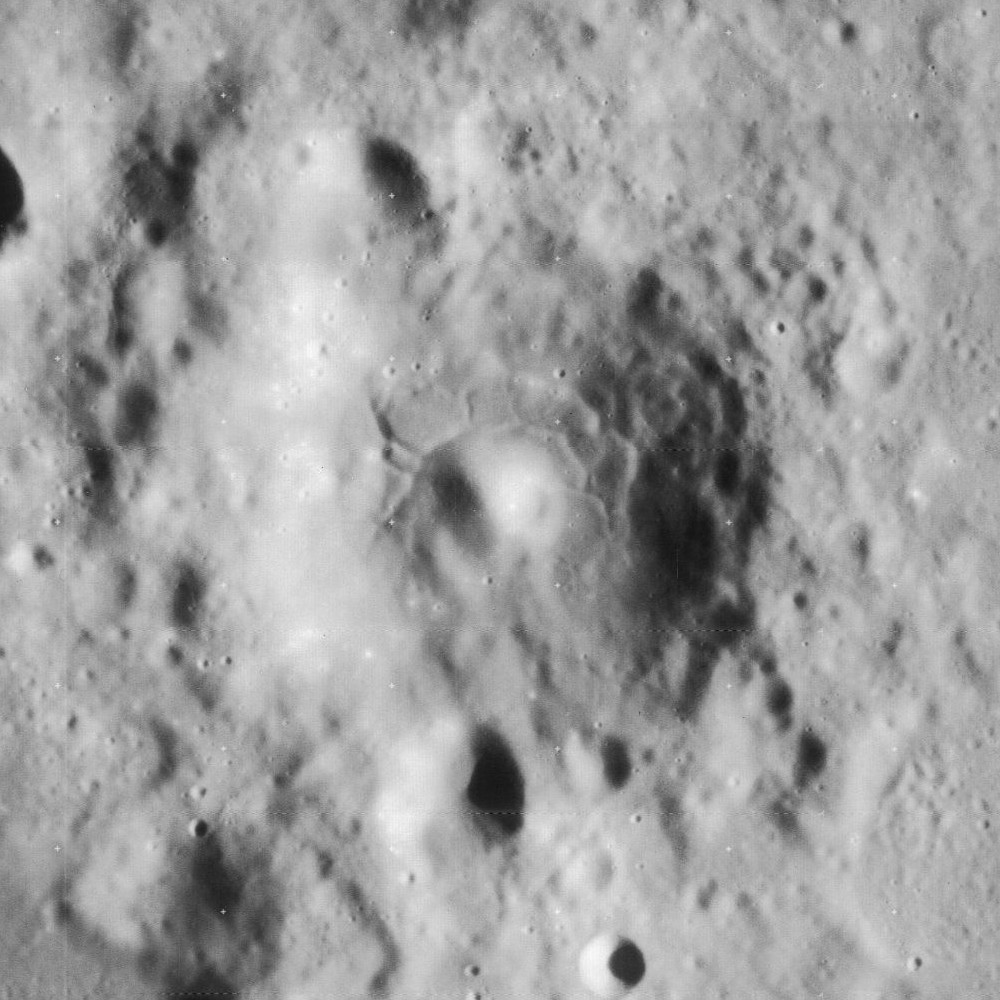
- Lunar Orbiter 4 image
- Coordinates: 18.14°S 5.61°E
- Diameter: 38.90 km (24.17 mi)
- Depth: 1.8 km
- Colongitude: 354° at sunrise
- Eponym: George B. Airy

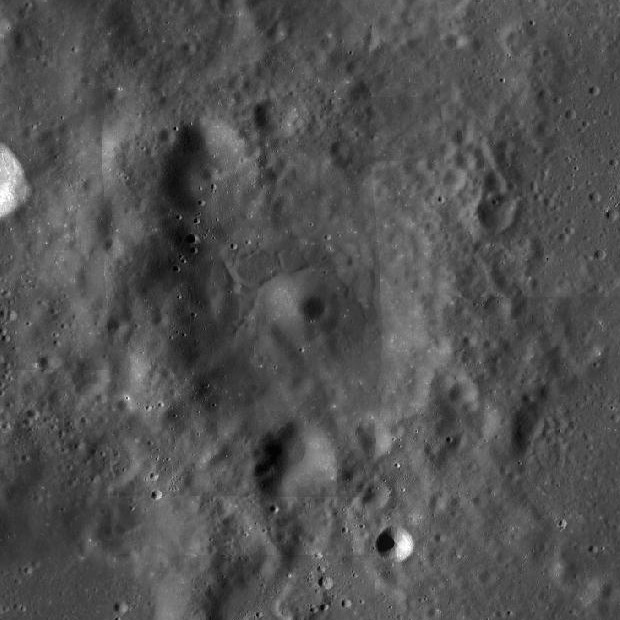
LRO WAC mosaic

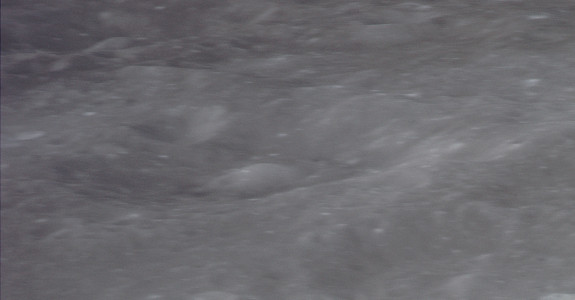
Oblique view from Apollo 14

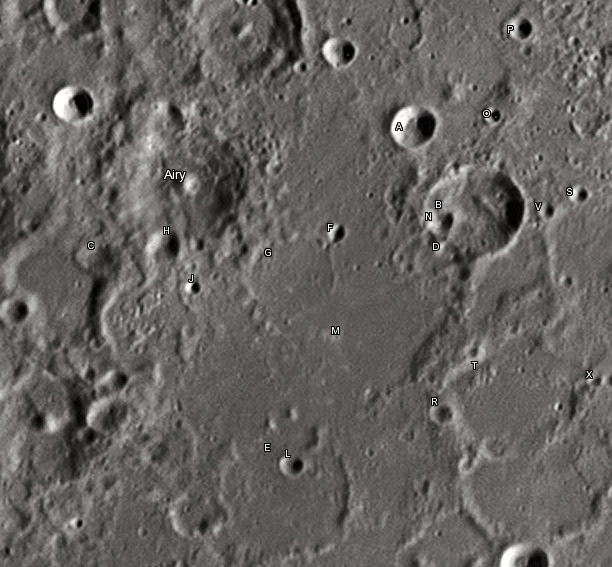
Vicinity of Airy, as viewed from the Bayfordbury Observatory

Airy is a lunar impact crater located in the southern highlands. It forms the southernmost member of a chain of craters consisting of Vogel, Argelander, and Airy. A little further to the south lies Donati. Airy has a worn, and somewhat polygonal rim that it broken at the northern and southern ends. It is a floor-fractured crater with a central peak.

To the west of Airy crater is an albedo feature resembling a lunar swirl. These features are normally associated with a magnetic anomaly. It is described as an "elongated curved bright area with a central darker lane." The magnetic anomaly causing the feature was discovered based on magnetometer data from the Lunar Prospector spacecraft.

This crater is named in honour of British astronomer George Biddell Airy (1801–1892). His name was introduced into lunar nomenclature by German astronomer J. H. von Mädler in 1837. Its designation was formally adopted by the International Astronomical Union in 1935.

== Satellite craters ==
By convention these features are identified on lunar maps by placing the letter on the side of the crater midpoint that is closest to Airy.

Airy	Latitude	Longitude	Diameter
A	17.0° S	7.7° E	13 km
B	17.6° S	8.5° E	29 km
C	19.3° S	4.9° E	34 km
D	18.2° S	8.5° E	7 km
E	20.7° S	7.6° E	38 km
F	18.2° S	7.3° E	5 km
G	18.7° S	7.0° E	25 km
H	18.7° S	5.8° E	9 km
J	19.0° S	6.1° E	4 km
L	20.4° S	7.5° E	6 km
M	19.2° S	7.6° E	1 km
N	17.8° S	8.2° E	8 km
O	16.7° S	8.3° E	5 km
P	15.8° S	8.4° E	7 km
R	19.6° S	8.8° E	7 km
S	17.2° S	9.4° E	5 km
T	19.2° S	9.4° E	40 km
V	17.5° S	9.2° E	5 km
X	18.9° S	10.2° E	4 km
