= Parrot (crater) =

Crater on the Moon

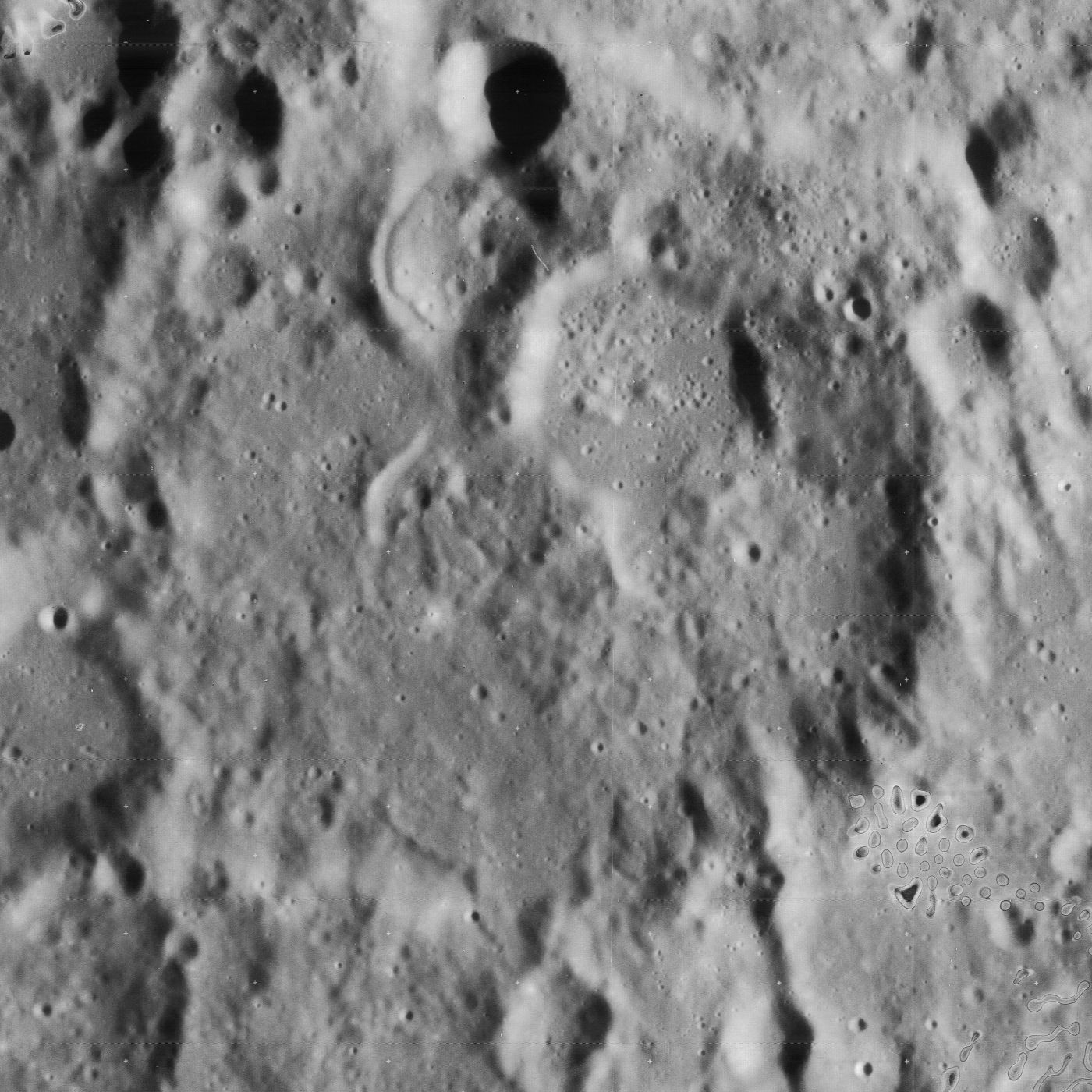
- Lunar Orbiter 4 image
- Coordinates: 14.5°S 3.3°E
- Diameter: 70 km
- Depth: 1.1 km
- Colongitude: 357° at sunrise
- Eponym: Friedrich Parrot

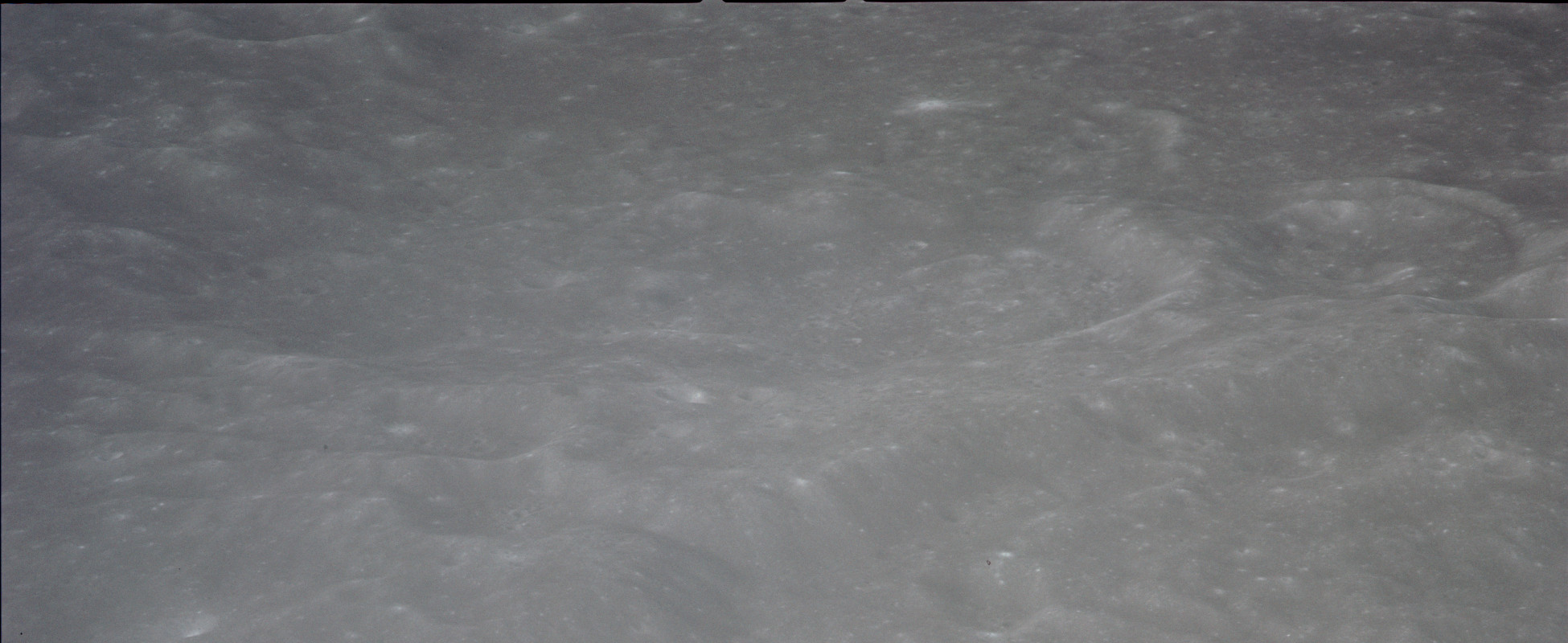
Oblique view of Parrot D crater, with most of Parrot itself in upper right, from Apollo 14

Parrot is the remains of a lunar impact crater that has been almost completely worn away. It was named after Russian doctor and physicist Friedrich Parrot. It is attached to the southern rim of the crater Albategnius, and is located among the rugged highlands among the south-central part of the visible Moon. To the east is the small crater Vogel, and in the southeast is Arzachel.

Little remains of the southwestern rim of Parrot, and the other sections of the wall have been worn and smoothed by impact erosion. The remains of a pair of overlapping craters occupy much of the northern floor of the crater, and the remainder is irregular but relatively flat. No central peak remains.

A groove structure intersects the southeast and part of the northern rim, following an intermittent line from the south-southeast to the north-northwest.

== Swirl pattern southeast of Parrot G ==
Southeast of satellite crater Parrot G, at and near Rand McNally's Loró Basin, a pattern related to lunar swirls is discernible before, during, and after full moon. This swirl pattern is also noticeable on the photographic version of chart LAC 95 (page 190) in The Clementine Atlas of the Moon (Ben Bussey / Paul D. Spudis).

== Satellite craters ==
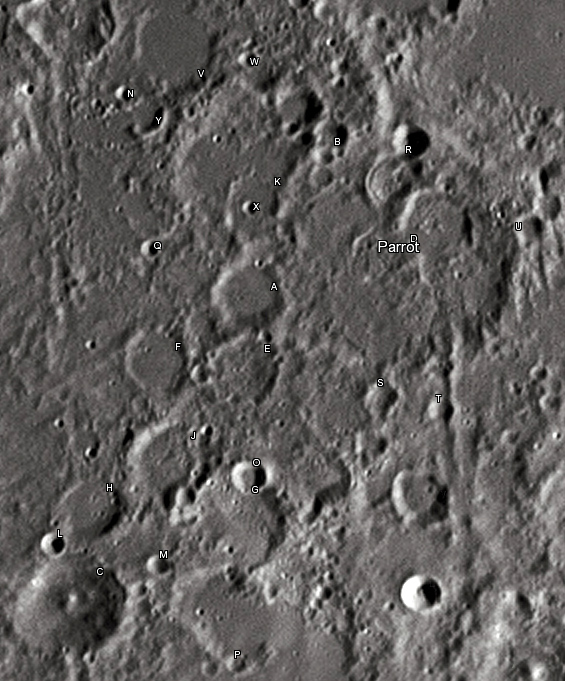
Parrot crater and its satellite craters taken from Earth in 2012 at the University of Hertfordshire's Bayfordbury Observatory with the telescopes Meade LX200 14" and Lumenera Skynyx 2-1

By convention these features are identified on lunar maps by placing the letter on the side of the crater midpoint that is closest to Parrot.

Parrot	Latitude	Longitude	Diameter
A	15.3° S	2.1° E	21 km
B	13.6° S	2.5° E	10 km
C	18.5° S	1.2° E	31 km
D	14.2° S	3.6° E	21 km
E	16.0° S	2.3° E	20 km
F	16.1° S	1.4° E	19 km
G	17.4° S	2.6° E	28 km
H	17.6° S	1.2° E	19 km
J	17.0° S	1.8° E	23 km
K	14.1° S	1.8° E	44 km
L	18.0° S	0.9° E	7 km
M	18.0° S	2.0° E	7 km
N	13.8° S	0.5° E	5 km
O	16.9° S	2.6° E	10 km
P	18.6° S	3.0° E	6 km
Q	15.1° S	1.1° E	5 km
R	13.5° S	3.2° E	10 km
S	15.9° S	3.6° E	10 km
T	15.9° S	4.2° E	8 km
U	14.1° S	4.5° E	10 km
V	13.2° S	0.8° E	24 km
W	13.2° S	1.5° E	5 km
X	14.5° S	1.9° E	4 km
Y	13.9° S	0.7° E	10 km
