= Carl F. W. Peters =

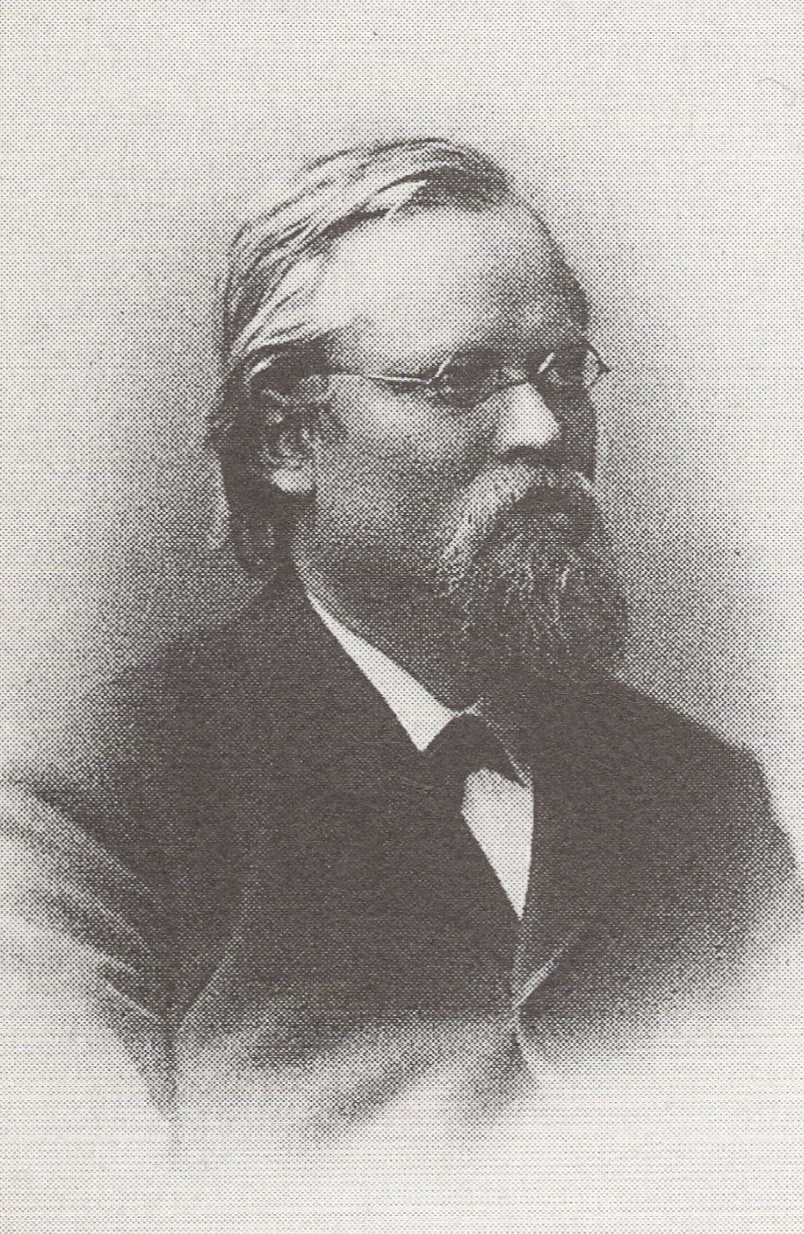

Carl Friedrich Wilhelm Peters (16 April 1844 – 2 December 1894) was a German astronomer. His key work was on studies of chronometers and the effect of temperature and humidity on their accuracy.

Peters was born in Pulkowo where his father, the astronomer Christian August Friedrich Peters worked at the observatory. The family moved to Königsberg in 1849 and later to Altona. He studied astronomy and mathematics at the Universities of Berlin, Kiel and Munich before obtaining a doctorate from the University of Göttingen with a thesis on the determination of the orbit of minor planet 87 Sylvia.

He joined the Hamburg observatory in 1867, worked at Altona in 1868 and Kiel in 1873 before becoming director at the Königsberg Observatory in 1888 while also serving as a professor of astronomy at the University. He calculated the orbit of the double star 61 Cygni and for sometime was involved in geodetical determinations of longitude and examined the difference in longitude between Altona and Kiel. He also worked on the accuracy of chronometers and examined the effects of temperature and humidity on them.

Between 1883 and 1888 he was in-charge of the naval chronometer observatory at Kiel. He edited revisions of Savich's Practical Astronomy and Müller-Pouillet's Cosmical Physics.
