= Christian Mayer (astronomer) =

Czech-German astronomer

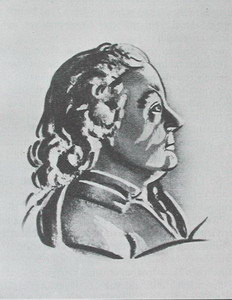
Christian Mayer

Christian Mayer (20 August 1719 Mederitz – 16 April 1783 in Mannheim) was a Moravian-German Catholic priest, astronomer and teacher.

== Life ==
He was born in Mederitz, Moravia. He became educated in Greek, Latin, mathematics, philosophy, and theology, although his place of studies is unknown. In his early twenties he decided to become a Jesuit, a path which caused him to leave his home due to the disapproval of his father. He entered the Society of Jesus in Mannheim in 1745. After completing his training he began teaching humanities.

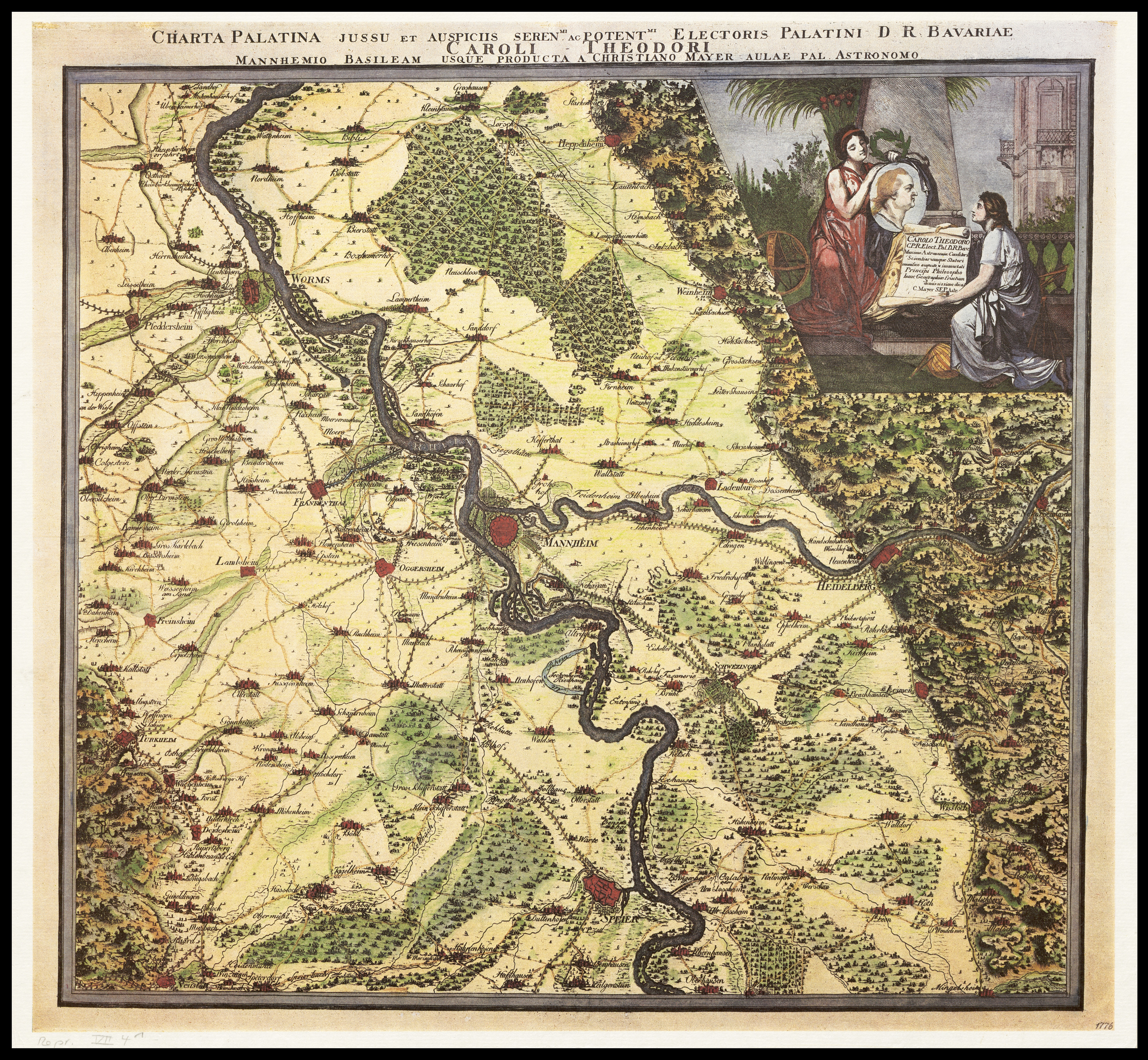
Mannheim and environs, Charta Palatina of Christian Mayer, about 1775.

By 1752 his reputation was such that he was selected as a professor of mathematics and physics at Heidelberg. By this age, however, he had developed a strong interest in astronomy. He was appointed Court Astronomer at Mannheim, and was tasked with selecting the instruments for the new observatories at Schwetzingen and Mannheim. With these completed, he was able to pursue his astronomical studies, and published numerous works. In 1769 he was invited to St. Petersburg to observe the transit of Venus, which he did together with Anders Johan Lexell. In 1773, the Jesuit order was dissolved by Pope Clement XIV, and consequently he was removed as Court Astronomer. However he was still able to continue his astronomical observations and studies. He applied for and was granted in December 1765 a Fellowship of the Royal Society and in 1768 he was elected to the American Philosophical Society.

He is most noted for pioneering the study of binary stars, although his equipment was ill-suitable for distinguishing between true binaries and coincident star alignments. In 1777-78 he compiled a catalog of 80 double stars, which he published in 1781.

During his lifetime he became a member of numerous learned societies. He died in Heidelberg.

- Pantometrum Pacechianum, seu instrumentum novum pro elicienda ex una statione distantia loci inaccessi, 1762, Mannheim.
- Basis Palatina, 1763, Mannheim.
- Expositio de transitu Veneris, 1769, St. Petersburg.
- Nouvelle méthode pour lever en peu de temps et à peu de frais une carte générale et exacte de toute la Russie, 1770, St. Petersburg.
- Gründliche Vertheidigung neuer Beobachtungen von Fixsterntrabanten welche zu Mannheim auf der kurfürstl. Sternwarte endecket worden sind, 1778, Mannheim.
- De novis in coelo sidereo phaenomenis in miris stellarum fixarum comitibus, 1779, Mannheim

== See also ==
- List of Jesuit scientists
- List of Roman Catholic scientist-clerics

== Bibliography ==
- Alexander Moutchnik, Forschung und Lehre in der zweiten Hälfte des 18. Jahrhunderts. Der Naturwissenschaftler und Universitätsprofessor Christian Mayer SJ (1719–1783) (Algorismus, Studien zur Geschichte der Mathematik und der Naturwissenschaften, Bd. 54), Erwin Rauner Verlag, Augsburg, 523 Seiten mit 8 Tafeln, 2006. ISBN 3-936905-16-9 http://www.erwin-rauner.de/algor/ign_publ.htm#H54 [Scientific Research and University Teaching in the 2nd half of the 18th century. Natural Scientist and University Professor Christian Mayer SJ (1719–1783)] Inhaltsverzeichnis: https://www.ulb.tu-darmstadt.de/tocs/178692786.pdf

== Honors ==
- The crater C. Mayer on the Moon is named after him.
