= Durchmusterung =

Star catalogue

- Alternative names: Bonner Durchmusterung
- Survey type: star catalogue

In astronomy, Durchmusterung or Bonner Durchmusterung (BD) is an astrometric star catalogue of the entire sky, published by the Bonn Observatory in Germany from 1859 to 1863, with an extension published in Bonn in 1886. The name comes from Durchmusterung ('run-through examination'), a German word used for a systematic survey of objects or data. The term has sometimes been used for other astronomical surveys, including not only stars, but also the search for other celestial objects. Special tasks include celestial scanning in electromagnetic wavelengths shorter or longer than visible light waves.

== Original catalog ==
The Bonner Durchmusterung (abbreviated BD), was initiated by Friedrich Argelander and using observations largely carried out by his assistants, which resulted in a catalogue of the positions and apparent magnitudes of 342,198 stars down to approximate apparent magnitude 9.5 and covering the sky from 90°N to 2°S declination. The catalogue, published in three parts, was accompanied by charts plotting the positions of the stars, and was the basis for the Astronomische Gesellschaft Katalog (AGK) and Smithsonian Astrophysical Observatory Star Catalog (SAO) catalogues of the 20th century. In 1886 Eduard Schönfeld, also in Bonn as Argelander's successor and previously as an assistant to Argelander on the original BD project, published an extension from 2°S to 23°S declination. (A further extension from an observatory in Cordoba Argentina was published in five parts between 1892 and 1932 to cover the southern sky from 22°S to 90°S declination.) BD star numbers are still used and allow the correlation of the work with modern projects.

The format of a BD number is exemplified by "BD−16 1591", which is the BD number of Sirius. This number signifies that in the catalog, Sirius is the 1591st star listed in the declination zone between −16 and −17 degrees, counting from 0 hours right ascension. Stellar positions and zone boundaries use an equinox for the epoch of B1855.0.

== Extension ==
Many astronomical research projects—from studies of celestial mechanics and the Solar System, up to the nascent field of astrophysics—were made possible by the publication of the atlas and data of the Bonner Durchmusterung. However, a deficiency of the BD was that it did not cover the whole sky, because far southern stars are not visible from Germany.

This led the scientific community to supplement the BD with two additional astrometric surveys carried out by observatories located in the Southern Hemisphere: Córdoba, Argentina, and Cape Town, South Africa. The Cordoba Durchmusterung (abbreviated CD, or, less commonly, CoD) was made visually (as was the BD), but the Cape Photographic Durchmusterung (CP or CPD) was conducted by the then-new photographic technique, which had just been shown to have sufficient accuracy. The southern stars are identified by CD and CPD numbers in a manner similar to the BD numbering system.

A few decades later, the positional accuracy of the Durchmusterung catalogues began to be insufficient for many projects. To establish a more exact reference system for the Bonner Durchmusterung, astronomers and geodesists began to work on a fundamental celestial coordinate system based on the Earth's rotation axis, the vernal equinox and the ecliptic plane in the late 19th century. This astrometric project led to the Catalogues of Fundamental Stars of the Berlin observatory, and was used as an exact coordinate frame for the BD and AGK. It was modernized in the 1920s (FK3, mean accuracy ±1″), and in 2000 (FK6, accuracy 0.1″) as successive steps of cosmic geodesy. Together with radio-astronomical measurements, the FK6 accuracy was better than ±0.1″.

== Modern counterparts ==
The Hipparcos satellite operated between 1989 and 1993 and observed around 118,000 stars over the whole sky. Three star catalogues were published from its data:

- Hipparcos Catalogue (118,000 stars, average accuracy ±0.001″)
- Tycho Catalogue (about 1,050,000 stars, with accuracy ±0.03″)
- Tycho-2 Catalogue (about 2,500,000 stars), which was improved for double star effects and proper motions using the Astrographic Catalogue observations.

The Gaia space observatory, launched in December 2013, has catalogued more than one billion stars with an accuracy down to 20 microarcseconds (0.00002″).
