= Christian August Friedrich Peters =

German astronomer

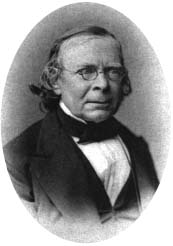
Christian August Friedrich Peters (1806–1880)

Christian August Friedrich Peters (7 September 1806 – 8 May 1880) was a German astronomer. He was the father of astronomer Carl Friedrich Wilhelm Peters. He was born in Hamburg and died in Kiel.

Peters was the son of a merchant and, although he did not attend secondary school regularly, he obtained a good knowledge of mathematics and astronomy. In 1826 he became assistant to Heinrich Christian Schumacher at Altona Observatory. Schumacher encouraged him to study astronomy and Peters did a PhD under Friedrich Bessel at the University of Königsberg. In 1834 he became an assistant at Hamburg Observatory and in 1839 joined the staff of Pulkovo Observatory. In 1849 he became professor of astronomy at Königsberg and soon after succeeded Bessel as director of the observatory there. In 1854 he became director of the Altona Observatory and editor of the Astronomische Nachrichten. Peters edited the journal for the rest of his life, being responsible for 58 volumes of the journal. In 1872 the observatory moved to Kiel and he moved there and continued in his post. In 1866, he was elected a foreign member of the Royal Swedish Academy of Sciences.

Peters became a name in the literature on the theory of errors for his 1856 note on the estimation of precision using absolute deviations from the mean.

Peters won the Gold Medal of the Royal Astronomical Society in 1852.

== Works ==
- Numerus constans nutationis ex ascensionibus rectis stellae polaris in specula Dorpatensi annis 1822 ad 1838 observatis deductus. (1842)
- Resultate aus Beobachtungen des Polarsterns am Ertelschen Vertikalkreise. 1842
- Recherches sur la parallaxe des étoiles fixes. (1847)
- Über die eigene Bewegung des Sirius. Diese Schrift führte zur Entdeckung des Sirius-Begleiters. Astronomische Nachrichten, 32, (1851), 1-58.
- Über die Bestimmung des wahrscheinlichen Fehlers einer Beobachtung aus den Abweichungen der Beobachtungen von ihrem arithmetischen Mittel, Astronomische Nachrichten, 44, (1856). 29-32.

The articles Peters published in Astronomische Nachrichten are all available on-line.

== Biography ==
- H. C. Freiesleben Peters, Christian August Friedrich Dictionary of Scientific Biography, vol. 10, 542-3.
