= Alexander Moutchnik =

Soviet professor (born 1976)

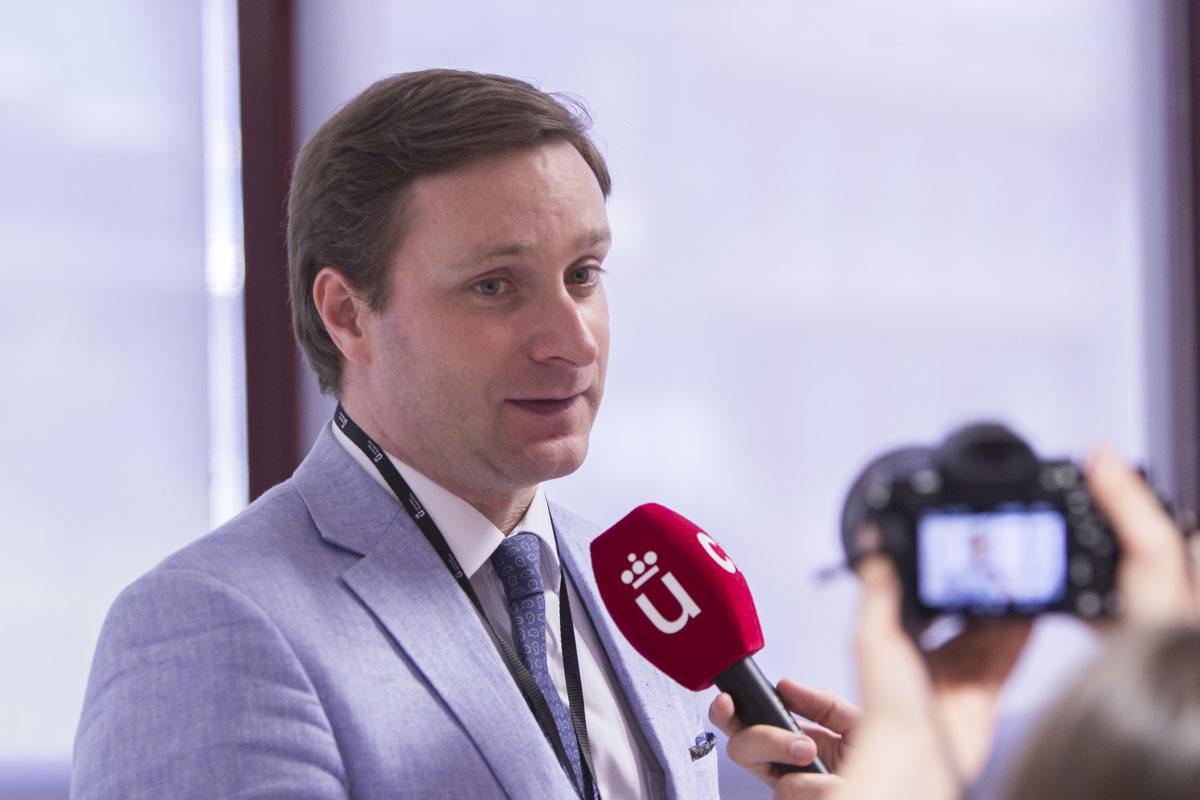
- Alexander Moutchnik (2018)
- Born: 6 October 1976 (age 50); Leningrad, Soviet Union

Academic background
- Education: State Pedagogical University in Saint Petersburg (1993-1997); French University College of Saint Petersburg (1995-1997); University of Heidelberg (1997-2001)
- Doctoral advisor: Eike Wolgast; Heinz-Dietrich Löwe; Dietfried Günter Liesegang; Frank Jöst

Alexander Moutchnik (born 6 October 1976) is a professor of media economics and media management. He focuses on social media, media history, sustainability and corporate social responsibility. Since 2013 Moutchnik has been teaching at the RheinMain University of Applied Sciences in Wiesbaden (Germany) in the Department of Design, Computer Science and Media.

== Education ==
In addition to his master's study in history, sociology and political science at the State Pedagogical University in Saint Petersburg from 1993 to 1997, he completed a diploma in history at the French University College of Saint Petersburg from 1995 to 1997. He completed this with the Diplôme d'Études et de Recherche (D.E.R.) on the topic "The image of Russia in the periodicals edited by Jean Henri Samuel Formey and in his correspondence in the middle of the 18th century at the time of Elisavéta Petrovna (1741-1761)". The reviewer was Wladimir Berelowitch. From 1997 to 2001, Moutchnik studied economics at the University of Heidelberg, graduating with a degree in economics for his thesis on “System-theoretical cybernetic modeling of the holistic corporate management system with a balanced scorecard using the practical example of Heidelberger Druckmaschinen AG". In 2002, he completed a master's degree in Middle, Modern and Eastern European History at the University of Heidelberg, which he had begun in 1997. The degree of Magister Artium was achieved with the master's thesis on "Development of international scientific relations in Europe in the second half of the 18th century" (reviewers: Eike Wolgast and Heinz-Dietrich Löwe). In 2005, Moutchnik was awarded a doctorate in Modern History (Dr. phil.) on the topic "Research and Teaching in the second half of the 18th century. The natural scientist and university professor Christian Mayer SJ (1719-1783)". From 2003 to 2007 he received his doctorate in business administration with a thesis on the topic "Standardization of Corporate Environmental Management. Business case: Multinational Cement Corporation" also at the University of Heidelberg.

== Professional activities ==
From April 2004 to March 2008, Moutchnik was a research assistant at Dietfried Günter Liesegang's chair of business administration at the University of Heidelberg. Subsequently, until August 2013, head of the study course "Media and Communication Management" at the Mediadesign University in Munich. Since October 2013 Moutchnik is professor for media management and media economics at the RheinMain University of Applied Sciences in the department of design, computer science and media in Wiesbaden.

=== Projects at the RheinMain University of Applied Sciences in Wiesbaden ===
- 2019/20: Encyclopedia of Internet Phenomena: www.internetphaenomene.de
- 2019: Highlights from the history of the Hessian State Archive on YouTube
- 2014/16: Branding of historical heritage (State Palaces, Gardens and State Museums) of Hesse

== Other commitments ==
Moutchnik is deputy chairman of the senate election committee of the RheinMain University of Applied Sciences and was head of the master's program "Media & Design Management" from 2014 to 2018. He is editorial board member of the "International Journal of Corporate Social Responsibility" of the SpringerNature and member of the editorial board "Sustainability Management Forum" of the same publishing house. He is a member of the Presseclub Wiesbaden.

== Literature ==
=== Media management and media economics ===
- Kochhan, C., Moutchnik, A. (2018). Media Management. Ein interdisziplinäres Kompendium (in German). Wiesbaden: Springer Research.
- Kochhan, C., Lorenz Amezcua, M., Moutchnik, A., Rhein H. (2016). Kulturerleben nachgefragt: Generation Y, junge Eltern und 55-65-Jährige im Interview. Springer. ISBN 978-3-658-13838-7.
- Moutchnik, A. (2009). The media and ISO management systems. ISO Management Systems.

=== Sustainability and corporate social responsibility ===
- Wagner, R., Roschker, N., Moutchnik, A. (2017). CSR und Interne Kommunikation. Forschungsansätze und Praxisbeiträge [CSR and internal communication. Research approaches and practical contributions] (in German). Wiesbaden: Springer Gabler.
- Moutchnik, A., Schmidpeter, R. (2016). CSR- und Nachhaltigkeitsmanagement: Beiträge der Forschung und Praxis [CSR and sustainability management: contributions from research and practice] (in German). Wiesbaden: SpringerGabler.
- Moutchnik, A., Rademacher, L. (2016). CSR-Kommunikation und CSR-Wahrnehmung: Forschungs- und Praxisbeiträge [CSR communication and CSR perception: research and practical contributions] (in German).
- Moutchnik, A., Rademacher, L. (2015). Innovationen und Trends im CSR-Management [Innovations and trends in CSR management] (in German). UmweltWirtschaftsForum. Band 23, Issue 4.
- Moutchnik, A. (2013). Stakeholdermanagement im Dialog: Umwelt, Nachhaltigkeit, CSR [Stakeholder management in dialogue: Environment, Sustainability, CSR] (in German). UmweltWirtschaftsforum. Band 21, Issue 1–2.
- Moutchnik, A. (2011). Drehscheibe Kommunikation [Turntable Communication] (in German). UmweltWirtschaftsForum. Band 19, Issue 3–4.
- Moutchnik, A (2009). Nachhaltigkeit in Medien und Medienwirtschaft [Sustainability in media and media business] (in German). UmweltWirtschaftsForum. Band 17, Issue 1.
- Freeman, E., Moutchnik, A. (2013). Stakeholder management and CSR: questions and answers. UmweltWirtschaftsForum. Band 21.
- Moutchnik, A. (2013). Standards und Zertifikate im Umweltmanagement, im Sozialbereich und im Bereich gesellschaftlicher Verantwortung [Standards and certificates in environmental management, social and corporate responsibility.] (in German). Betriebliches Nachhaltigkeitsmanagement.
- Moutchnik, A. (2007). Standardization of Corporate Environmental Management. Business case: Multinational Cement Corporation. Ecology and Economic Research. Band 78.
- Moutchnik, A. (2007). Environmental Management Standards in the Public Sector. Proceedings of Green Olympics & Sustainable Development Forum, 綠色奧運 與可持續 發展論文集.

=== History ===
- Sigrist, R., Moutchnik, A. (2017). Les fondements sociaux du premier essor de la botanique en Russie, 1700-1830, Almagest [The social foundations of the first development of botany in Russia, 1700-1830, Almagest.] (in French). International Journal for the History of Scientific Ideas. Nr. 8.
- Moutchnik, A., Sigrist, R. (2016). La Russie d'Élisabeth Ire (1741–1761) d'après les journaux édités par Henri Samuel Formey [The Russia of Elizabeth I (1741-1761) according to newspapers edited by Henri Samuel Formey.] (in French). Россия и западноевропейское просвещение: сб. науч. тр. / [сост.: Н.П. Копанева; отв. ред.: В.Р. Фирсов; ред.: С.А. Давыдова, Н.П. Копанева]; Рос. нац. б-ка, Петровское ист. о во. – Санкт-Петербург: РНБ.
- Sigrist, R., Moutchnik, A. (2015). Entre Ciel et Terre: les fonctions de l'astronomie dans la Russie de 18e siècle [Between Heaven and Earth: the functions of astronomy in 18th century Russia.] (in French). Almagest. International Journal for the History of Scientific Ideas. Band 6, Issue 2.
- Moutchnik, A. (2009). Mediengeschichte. In: Handbuch des Medienmanagements [Media history. In: Manual of Media Management] (in German).
- Мучник, А. (2007). Петербургская Академия наук в журналах Формея [The St. Petersburg Academy of Sciences in the journals of Formeya.] (in Russian). Г. Ф. Миллер и русская культура, отв. ред. Д. Дальманн, Г. И. Смагина, СПб.
- Moutchnik, A. (2007). Die Entdeckung des Universums: Mannheims Hofastronom Christian Mayer und die Sternwarte [The discovery of the universe: Mannheim's court astronomer Christian Mayer and the observatory.] (in German). Geschichte der Stadt Mannheim, hrsg. von Ulrich Nieß und Michael Caroli.
- Moutchnik, A., Joost, U. (2006). "Der berühmte Pater und Professor der Astronomie" Christian Mayer im Jahre 1770 in Göttingen. Ein ungedrucktes Stück aus Lichtenbergs Tagebuch ["The famous priest and professor of astronomy" Christian Mayer in 1770 in Göttingen. An unprinted piece from Lichtenberg's diary.] (in German). Lichtenberg Jahrbuch.
- Moutchnik, A. (2006). Forschung und Lehre in der zweiten Hälfte des 18. Jahrhunderts. Der Naturwissenschaftler und Universitätsprofessor Christian Mayer SJ (1719-1783) [Research and teaching in the second half of the 18th century. The natural scientist and university professor Christian Mayer SJ (1719-1783).] (in German). Algorismus, Studien zur Geschichte der Mathematik und der Naturwissenschaften.
- Moutchnik, A. (2006). Der Strelitzen-Aufstand von 1698 [The Strelitzen Uprising of 1698.] (in German). Volksaufstände in Russland. Von der Zeit der Wirren bis zur «Grünen Revolution» gegen die Sowjetherrschaft.
- Moutchnik, A. (2006). Soziale und wirtschaftliche Grundzüge der Kartoffelaufstände von 1834 und von 1841–1843 in Russland [Social and economic principles of the potato revolts of 1834 and 1841-1843 in Russia] (in German). olksaufstände in Russland. Von der Zeit der Wirren bis zur «Grünen Revolution» gegen die Sowjetherrschaft.
