= Astronomische Nachrichten =

- Discipline: Astronomy, astrophysics
- Language: English
- Edited by: K. G. Strassmeier

Publication details
- History: 1821–present
- Publisher: Wiley-VCH; Astrophysical Institute Potsdam (Germany)
- Frequency: 10/year
- Impact factor: 0.676 (2020)

Standard abbreviations
- ISO 4: Astron. Nachr.

Indexing
- CODEN: ASNAAN
- ISSN: 0004-6337 (print); 1521-3994 (web)
- LCCN: 13011169
- OCLC no.: 76516376

Links
- Journal homepage; Online access; Online archive

Astronomische Nachrichten (Astronomical Notes), one of the first international journals in the field of astronomy, was established in 1821 by the German astronomer Heinrich Christian Schumacher. It claims to be the oldest astronomical journal in the world that is still being published. The publication today specializes in articles on solar physics, extragalactic astronomy, cosmology, geophysics, and instrumentation for these fields. All articles are subject to peer review.

== Early history ==
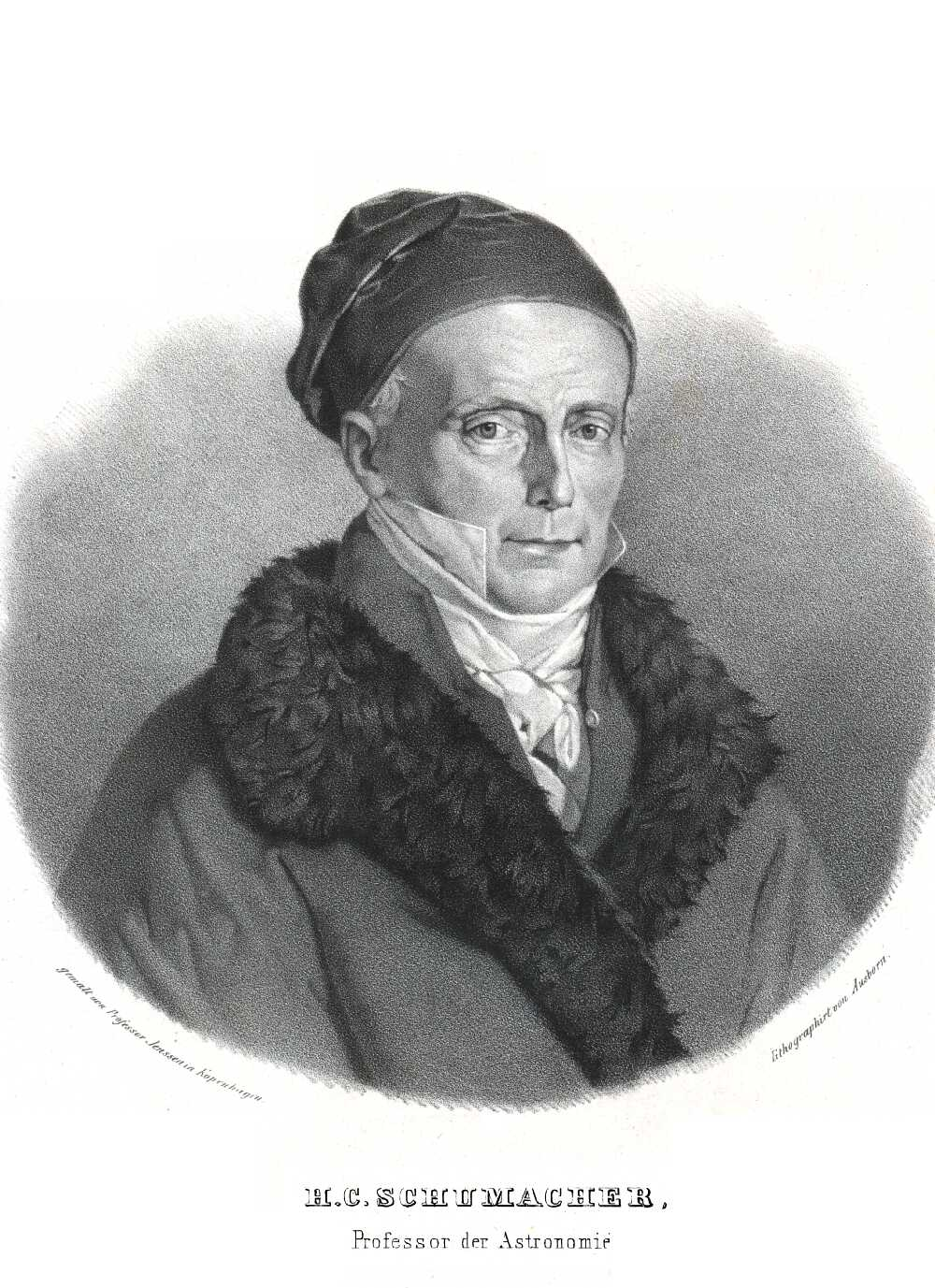
The founding editor Heinrich Christian Schumacher (1780–1850)

The journal was founded in 1821 by Heinrich Christian Schumacher, under the patronage of Christian VIII of Denmark, and quickly became the world's leading professional publication for the field of astronomy. Schumacher edited the journal at the Altona Observatory, then under the administration of Denmark, later part of Prussia, and today part of the German city of Hamburg.

Schumacher edited the first 31 issues of the journal, from its founding in 1821 until his death in 1850. These early issues ran to hundreds of pages, and consisted mostly of letters sent by astronomers to Schumacher, reporting their observations. The journal proved to be a great success, and over the years Schumacher received thousands of letters from hundreds of contributors. The letters were published in the language in which they were submitted, mostly German, but also English, Italian and other languages.

The journal's renown was acknowledged by the British astronomer John Herschel (then secretary to the Royal Astronomical Society) in a letter to the Danish King in 1840, writing that Astronomische Nachrichten was:

...one of the most remarkable and influential astronomical works, which have ever appeared and which, while operating more beneficially on the progress of its Science than any similar work of modern times [has] made your Majesty's city of Altona ... the astronomical centre of the civilised world.

— John Herschel to Christian VIII of Denmark, 1840,

Other astronomical journals were also founded around this time, such as the British Monthly Notices of the Royal Astronomical Society, which was founded in 1827. It was the importance of Astronomische Nachrichten, however, that led the American astronomer Benjamin A. Gould in 1850 to found The Astronomical Journal in the United States.

== Later history ==
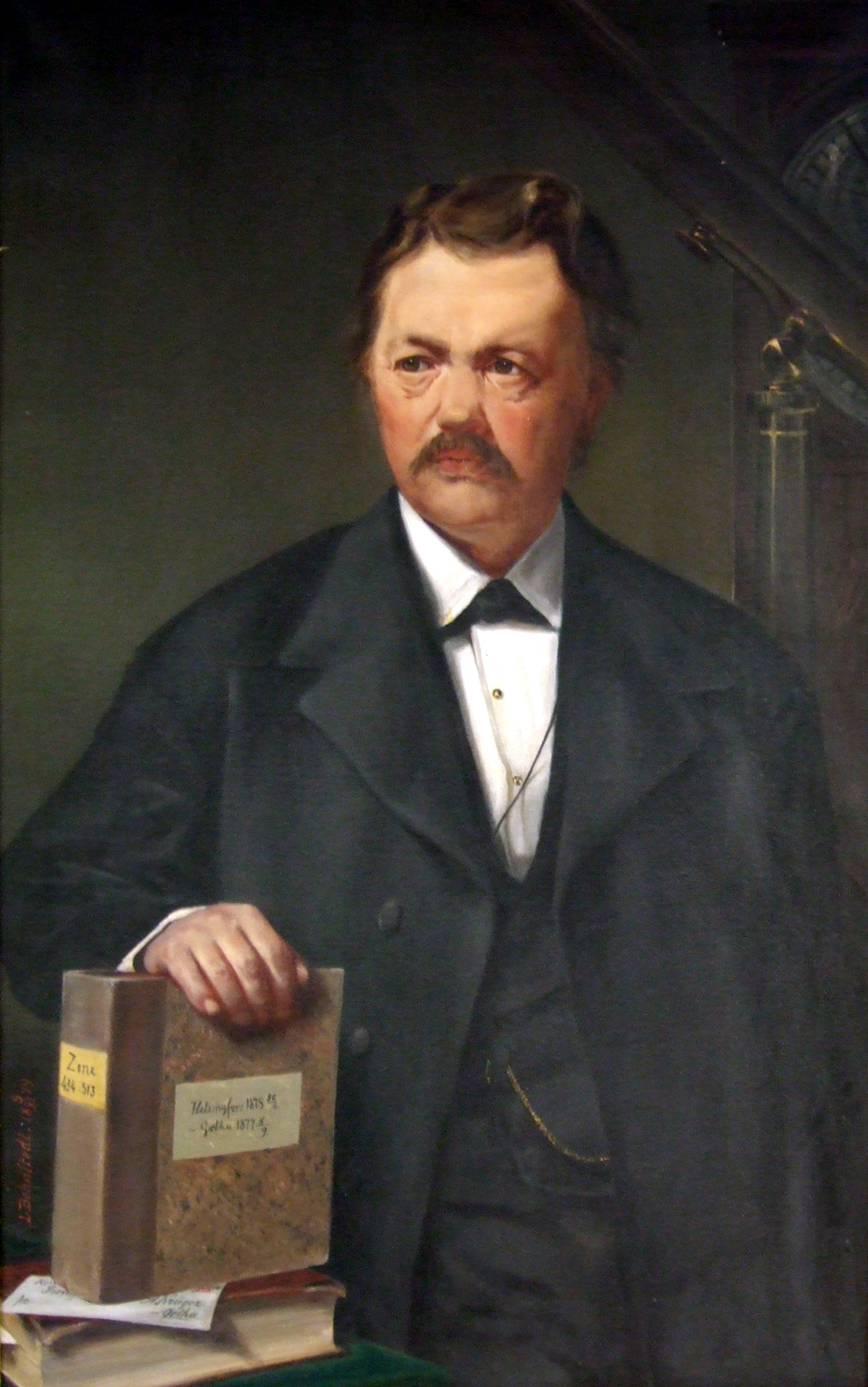
Adalbert Krueger, the fourth Astronomische Nachrichten editor (1881–1896)

Following Schumacher's death, the interim director of the observatory and editor of the journal was Adolph Cornelius Petersen, who had worked at the observatory with Schumacher for 24 years from around 1825. Petersen, who died in 1854, was later aided as editor by the Danish astronomer Thomas Clausen, who had also previously worked at the observatory.

The editor from 1854 was the German astronomer Christian August Friedrich Peters, who had taken over as director of the observatory at Altona. In 1872, the observatory moved from Altona to Kiel, from where Peters continued to publish the journal until his death in 1880, aided in his final years by his son Carl Friedrich Wilhelm Peters. The journal would continue to be published in Kiel until 1938.

Following Peters's death, Adalbert Krueger served as the new director of the observatory and editor of the journal from 1881 until he died in 1896. At this time the journal was the organ of the Astronomische Gesellschaft. The editor from 1896 until his death in 1907 was the German astronomer Heinrich Kreutz, who had previously assisted Krueger. Kreutz edited volumes 140 to 175. Other staff members during the period from 1880 to 1907 included the astronomers Richard Schorr and Elis Strömgren.

In 1892, Astronomische Nachrichten began assigning provisional designations of minor planets upon receipt of the notice of discovery. A permanent minor-planet designation was assigned after an orbit had been reliably determined. This responsibility was later assumed by the International Astronomical Union.

The editor from 1907 to 1938 was the German astronomer Hermann Kobold.

After Kobold retired in 1938, the journal's editorial office moved from Kiel to Berlin, and during the Second World War the journal was published by the Astronomical Calculation Institute (Heidelberg University) (Astronomisches Recheninstitut) in Berlin-Dahlem. In 1945, the institute was relocated to Heidelberg, but the journal remained in the Berlin region.

After the war, Astronomische Nachrichten was edited by Hans Kienle, director of the Astrophysical Observatory of Potsdam. The observatory was in Potsdam, on the outskirts of Berlin, and from 1948 the journal was published by the publishing company Akademie-Verlag, under the auspices of the German Academy of Sciences Berlin. One of Kienle's students, Johann Wempe (1906–1980) succeeded him as editor in 1951 and held the post for 22 years.

From 1949, and officially from the 1950s until the reunification of Germany in 1990, the journal was published in the German Democratic Republic, behind the Iron Curtain. From 1974 onwards, the journal issues list a chief editor and an editorial board, and the journal was bilingual, with the same material published in German and English. Akademie-Verlag was taken over by VCH in 1990.

From 1996 to the present day (from volume 317), the journal has been published by Wiley-VCH. This company was formed in 1996 when the German publishing company Verlag Chemie (founded 1921) joined John Wiley and Sons. The journal's editorial offices remain in Potsdam, at the Astrophysical Institute Potsdam, and the current editor (2007) is K. G. Strassmeier.

The back catalogue of the journal includes 43,899 articles in 99,565 pages in 328 volumes, published over a period of over 180 years.

== Publication format and schedule ==
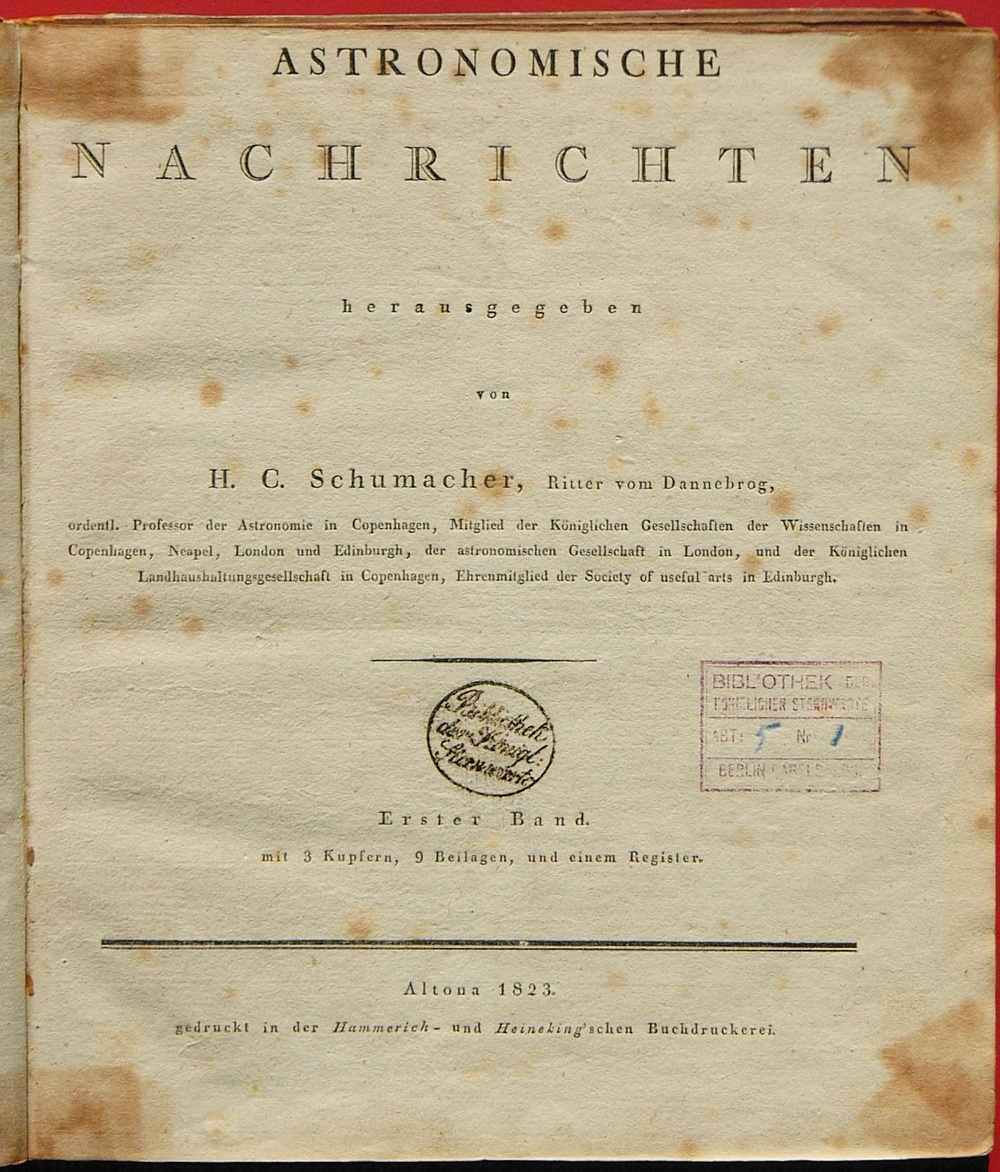
Title page from 1823

Although the journal was founded in 1821, the first volume was dated 1823. Volume 1 (1823) consisted of 33 issues and a total of 516 pages. The next year, volume 2 (1824), saw 34 issues and 497 pages. Apart from the years 1830–1832, when two volumes were published in 1831 and none in 1830 or 1832, single volumes of around 20–30 issues were published each year until 1846. Then it was mostly two volumes a year until 1884. There were a record number of five volumes published in 1884. Most years from 1884 to 1914 had three or more volumes.

The years 1915–1919 (coinciding with World War I) saw a dip in publication, with 1916 and 1919 only featuring one volume. From 1920 to 1940, most years saw three volumes published. Only one volume per year was published from 1941 to 1943, and the journal was not published at all from 1944 to 1946 (Berlin suffered heavy damage in the closing years of World War II). From 1947 to the present, the journal has published a volume per year in most years, but did not publish at all in some years in the 1950s, 1960s and 1970s. From 1974 to 1996, the journal was published as 6 issues a year, with each volume being 300–400 pages.

Under the new publishers, Wiley, this pattern continued until 2003, at which point the number of issues per year increased to 9 due to the publication of supplementary issues. Since 2004 there have been 10 issues a year. In 2006, volume 327, there were 10 issues and 1100 pages.

== Editors until 1972 ==
Volume	Year	Editor
1–31	1821–1851	Heinrich Christian Schumacher
32	1851	Adolph Cornelius Petersen
33–37	1852–1854	Adolph Cornelius Petersen and Peter Andreas Hansen
38	1854	Peter Andreas Hansen
39	1855	n/a
40–96	1855–1880	Christian August Friedrich Peters
97	1880	Christian August Friedrich Peters, Carl Friedrich Wilhelm Peters
98–99	1881	Carl Friedrich Wilhelm Peters
100–139	1881–1896	Adalbert Krueger
140	1896	Adalbert Krueger, Heinrich Kreutz
141–174	1896–1907	Heinrich Kreutz
175	1907	Heinrich Kreutz, Hermann Kobold
176–266	1908–1938	Hermann Kobold
267	1938	Hermann Kobold, Astronomical Calculation Institute (Heidelberg University) (Astronomisches Recheninstitut)
268–274	1939–1943	Astronomisches Recheninstitut (Name 1939–1944: Kopernikus-Institut)
275–279	1947–1951	Hans Kienle
280–294	1951–1972	Johann Wempe

== See also ==
- Johan Sigismund von Møsting
