= Eduard Schönfeld =

19th-century German astronomer

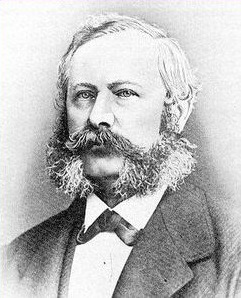
Eduard Schönfeld.

Eduard Schönfeld (22 December 1828 – 1 May 1891) was a German astronomer.

== Education ==
Schönfeld was born at Hildburghausen, in the Duchy of Saxe-Meiningen, where he had a distinguished career at the gymnasium. On leaving the gymnasium, he desired to devote himself to astronomy, but abandoned the idea in deference to his father's wishes. He went first to Hanover, and afterwards to Kassel to study architecture, for which he seems to have had little inclination. 1849 found him studying chemistry under Bunsen at Marburg, where his love for astronomy was revived by Gerling's lectures.

In 1851, he visited the Bonn Observatory and studied astronomy under Friedrich Wilhelm Argelander. In 1853, he was appointed assistant, and in the following year won a doctor's degree with his treatise Nova elementa Thetidis. At Bonn he took an important part in preparing the Durchmusterung of the northern heavens. He took up the investigation of the light-changes in variable stars, devoting to this work nights which, on account of moonlight, were unsuitable for zone observations. The results of these researches were published in the Sitz. Berich. Wien. Akad. vol. xlii.

== Mannheim Observatory ==
For a short time he was a Privatdozent at Bonn, but in 1859 he was appointed director of the Mannheim Observatory. The instrumental equipment of that observatory was somewhat antiquated, his largest telescope being a small refractor of 73 lines aperture, but he selected a line of work to suit the instruments at his disposal, observing nebulae and variable stars and keeping a watch on comets and new planets. The results of his observations of nebulae are contained in two catalogues published in the Astronomische Beobachtungen der Grossherzoglichen Sternwarte zu Mannheim, 1st and 2nd parts (1862 and 1875), and those of his variable star observations appeared in the Jahresberichte des Mannheimer Vereins für Naturkunde, Nos. 32 and 39 (1866 and 1875).

== Bonn Observatory ==
On the death of Argelander, which occurred on 17 February 1875, Schönfeld was appointed to succeed him as director of the Bonn Observatory, and soon after his appointment he began his last and greatest piece of work, the extension, on Argelander's plan, of the survey of the heavens down to 23 degrees of south declination. The experience gained on the northern survey under Argelander's direction enabled Schönfeld to introduce some improvements in the methods employed, which increased the accuracy of this work, which was practically accomplished in March 1881, some revision only remaining to be done. These zone observations afforded 363,932 separate places of stars, and form the groundwork of the catalogue of 133,659 stars between 2 and 23 degrees south declination, which was published in 1886 as the eighth volume of the Bonn observations.

== Affiliations ==
Schönfeld was a member of the Astronomische Gesellschaft from its foundation in 1863, being a member of council up to 1869, and in 1875 becoming editor of its publications and secretary in conjunction with Winnecke. In 1878 he was elected a Foreign Associate of the Royal Astronomical Society.

== Legacy ==
Minor planet 5926 Schönfeld is named in his honor.
