= Ralf Klessen =

German astronomer

Ralf Stephan Klessen (born 18 February 1968) is a German astronomer. He is a professor of theoretical astrophysics at the Institute of Theoretical Astrophysics, part of the Center for Astronomy at the University of Heidelberg, Germany, and is currently the Managing Director of the Institute, as well as a Deputy Director of the Center for Astronomy.

He is an expert in the areas of star formation and dwarf galaxies.

In 2002, he was winner of the Ludwig Biermann Award of the German Astronomical Society in recognition of his work on star formation in turbulent gas.
