= Anna Frebel =

German astronomer

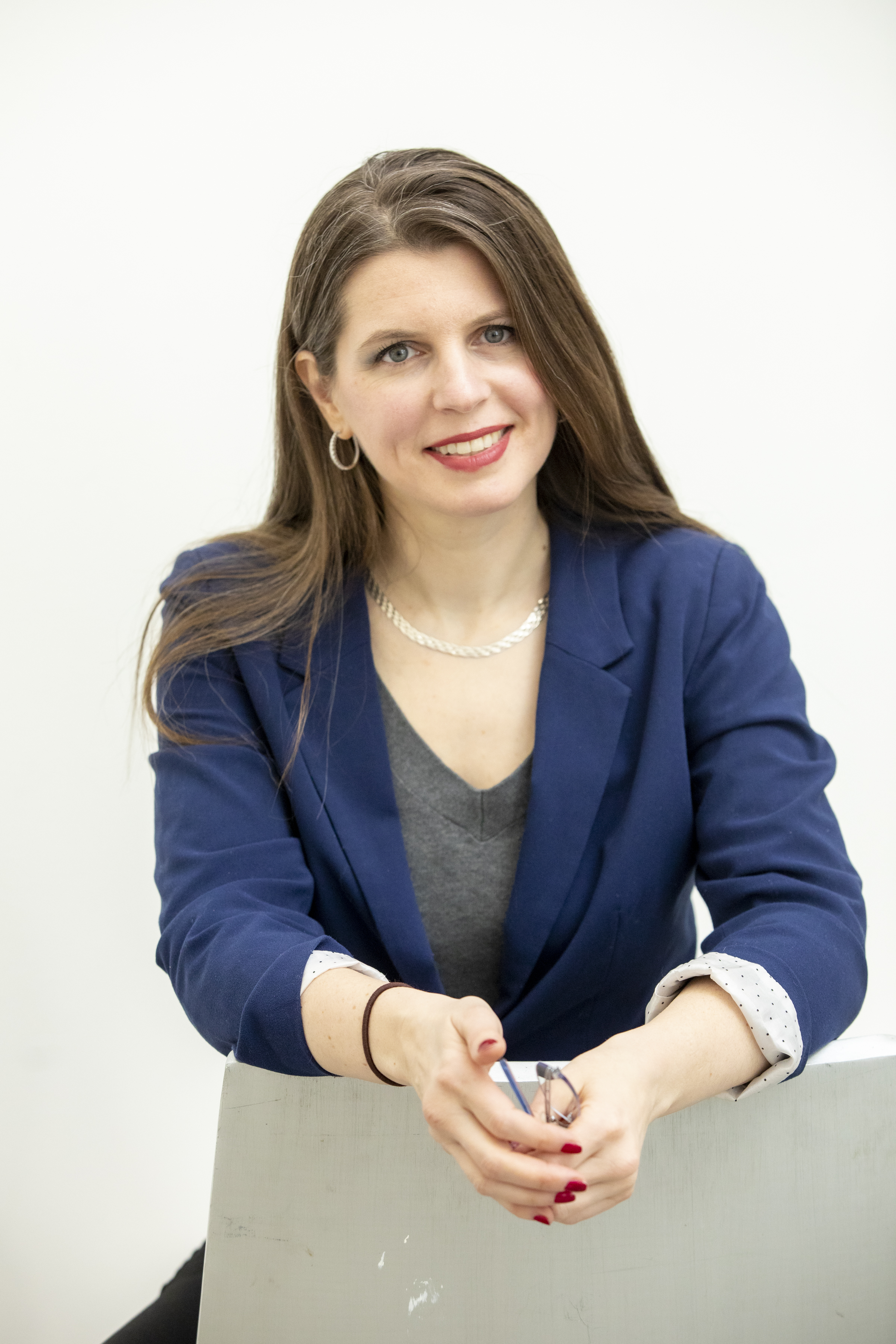
- Anna Frebel (2022)
- Born: 1980 (age 45–46); Berlin, Germany
- Education: Australian National University
- Known for: Discovering the oldest stars in the universe
- Awards: Ludwig Biermann Award; Annie Jump Cannon Award in Astronomy
- Scientific career
- Fields: Astronomy
- Workplaces: MIT; Harvard & Smithsonian (CfA); University of Texas
- Thesis: Abundance analysis of bright metal-poor stars from the Hamburg/ESO survey (2006)
- Doctoral advisor: John Edward Norris
- Other academic advisors: Martin Asplund; Michael Stanley Bessell

Anna Frebel (born 1980 in Berlin) is a German astronomer and author working on discovering the oldest stars in the universe.

== Career ==
Anna Frebel grew up in Göttingen, Germany. After finishing high school, she began studying physics in Freiburg im Breisgau. She moved to Australia, and in 2003 enrolled in an astronomy program in Australia, where she obtained her PhD in Astronomy & Astrophysics from the Australian National University's Mount Stromlo Observatory in Canberra. Shortly thereafter, a W. J. McDonald Postdoctoral Fellowship brought her to the University of Texas at Austin in 2006, where she continued her studies.

From 2009 to 2011, she was a Clay Postdoctoral Fellow at the Harvard & Smithsonian (CfA) in Cambridge (MA).

In 2012, she moved to Massachusetts Institute of Technology, achieving promotion to full professor in 2022. Since 2023, she has been Head of the Astrophysics Division.

== Discoveries ==
In 2005, Frebel discovered the star HE 1327-2326, which is one of the most iron-deficient stars, stemming from a time very shortly after the Big Bang. In 2007, she also discovered the red giant star HE 1523-0901, which is about 13.2 billion years old.

== Awards and honors ==
- 2007: Charlene Heisler Prize for the best astronomy PhD in 2006 in Australia
- 2009: Opening presentation XLAB Science Festival, Göttingen
- 2009: Ludwig Biermann Award (Young Astronomer Award) of the German Astronomical Society
- 2010: Annie J. Cannon Award of the American Astronomical Society
- 2010: Lise Meitner Lecturer, Göttingen and Innsbruck
- 2011: Kavli Frontiers of Science Fellow, National Academy of Sciences
- 2022: Fellow of the American Physical Society

== Publications (selection) ==
- Searching for the Oldest Stars — Ancient Relicts from the Early Universe, Princeton University Press, 2014, ISBN 9780691165066
- Auf der Suche nach den ältesten Sternen (in German), Frankfurt am Main: S. Fischer Verlage, 2012, ISBN 978-3-10-021512-3
- Astronomical Society of the Pacific, ed. (2008), New horizons in astronomy : Frank N. Bash Symposium 2007 : proceedings of a workshop held at the University of Texas, Austin, Texas, USA, 14–16 October 2007, San Francisco
