= Zah =

Zah or ZAH may refer to:

- Zah (name), list of people with the name
- Ẓāʼ (Arabic: ﻅ), a letter of the Arabic alphabet
- Zahedan International Airport, Iran
- The Center of Astronomy (University of Heidelberg)
- The Zoroastrian Association of Houston
