= Ludwig Biermann Award =

German astronomy award

- Native name: Ludwig-Biermann-Förderpreis
- Description: Annual prize awarded to an outstanding young astronomer by the German Astronomical Society
- Country: Germany
- Presented by: Astronomische Gesellschaft
- Reward: €2,500

The Ludwig Biermann Award is an annual prize awarded by the German Astronomische Gesellschaft (German Astronomical Society) to an outstanding young astronomer. The prize is named in honour of the German astronomer Ludwig Biermann and was first awarded in 1989, three years after his death. Nominees for the award must be under the age of 35. The monetary value of the award is 2500 €, and it is intended to enable the awardee to make one or more research visits to an institute of their choice. Usually, only a single prize is awarded per year, but in a few cases, two prizes have been awarded.

== Past winners of the Ludwig Biermann Award ==
Ludwig Biermann Award Winners
| Year | Name |
|---|---|
| 1989 | Norbert Langer |
| 1990 | Reinhard W. Hanuschik |
| 1992 | Joachim Puls |
| 1993 | Andreas Burkert |
| 1994 | Christoph U. Keller |
| 1995 | Karl Mannheim |
| 1996 | Eva K. Grebel, Matthias L. Bartelmann |
| 1997 | Ralf Napiwotzki |
| 1998 | Ralph Neuhäuser |
| 1999 | Markus Kissler-Patig |
| 2000 | Heino Falcke |
| 2001 | Stefanie Komossa |
| 2002 | Ralf Klessen |
| 2003 | Luis R. Bellot Rubio |
| 2004 | Falk Herwig |
| 2005 | Philipp Richter |
| 2006 | No award |
| 2007 | Henrik Beuther, Ansgar Reiners |
| 2008 | Andreas Koch |
| 2009 | Anna Frebel, Sonja Schuh |
| 2010 | Maryam Modjaz |
| 2011 | Thorsten Lisker |
| 2012 | Cecilia Scannapieco |
| 2013 | Frank Bigiel |
| 2014 | Stephan Geier |
| 2015 | Ivan Minchev |
| 2016 | Karin Lind |
| 2017 | Diederik Kruijssen |
| 2018 | Else Starkenburg |
| 2019 | Eduardo Bañados |
| 2020 | Paola Pinilla |
| 2021 | Fabian Schneider |
| 2022 | Thomas Siegert |
| 2023 | Dominika Wylezalek |
| 2024 | Matthias Kluge |
| 2025 | Anna-Christina Eilers |
| 2026 | Caroline Gieser |

== See also ==
- List of astronomy awards
- Prizes named after people
