= XY Ursae Majoris =

Eclipsing binary star system in the constellation of Ursa Major

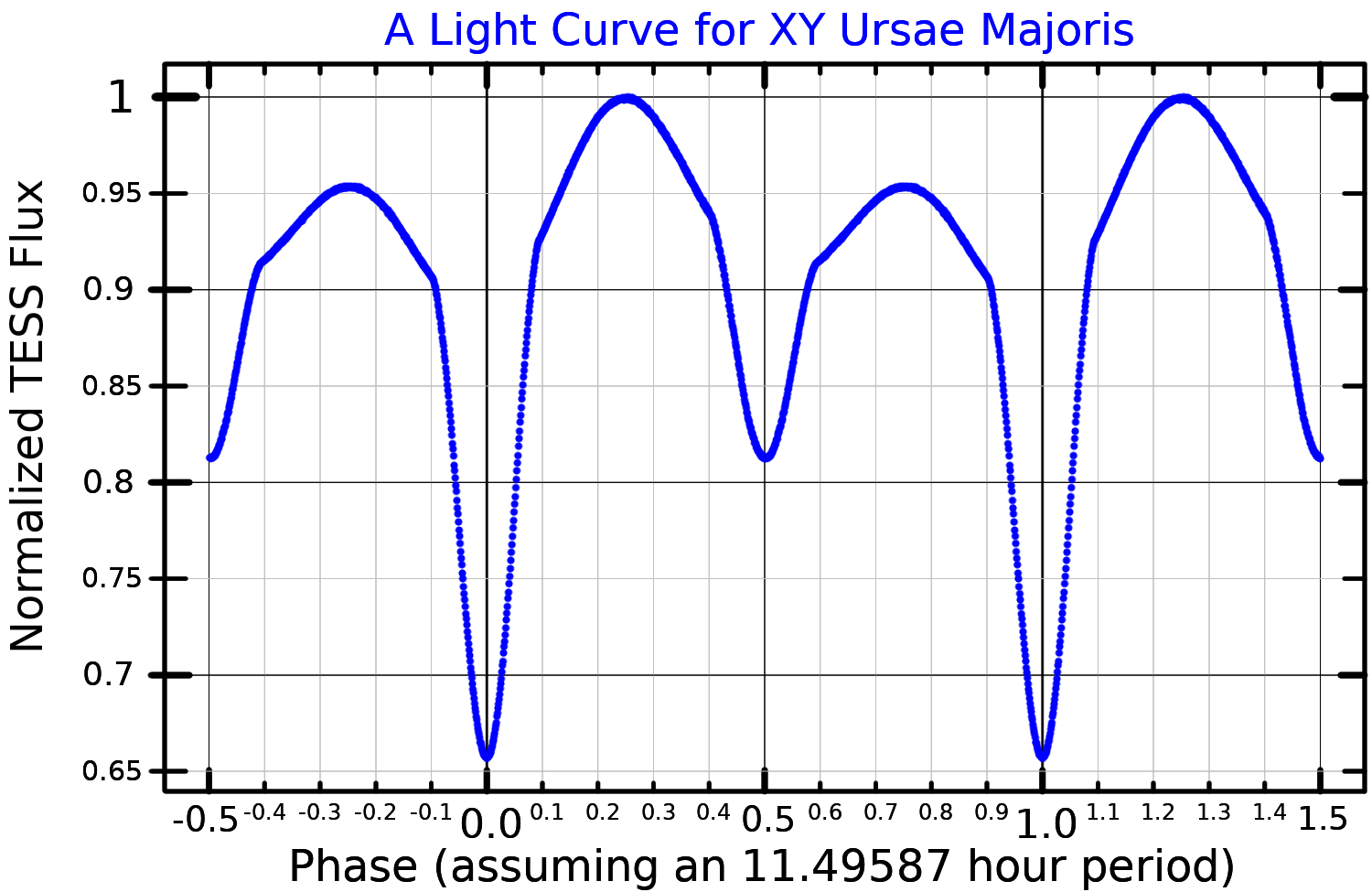
- A light curve for XY Ursae Majoris, plotted from TESS data

Observation data Epoch J2000.0 Equinox ICRS
- Constellation: Ursa Major
- Right ascension: 09^{h} 09^{m} 55.935^{s}
- Declination: +54° 29′ 17.72″
- Apparent magnitude (V): 9.50

Characteristics
- Evolutionary stage: main sequence
- Spectral type: G2V + K5V
- B−V color index: 0.765±0.039
- Variable type: Detached eclipsing binary, RS CVn

Astrometry
Radial velocity (R_{v})	−9.98±0.83 km/s
Proper motion (μ)	RA: −49.781 mas/yr Dec.: −182.641 mas/yr
Parallax (π)	14.7223±0.0137 mas
Distance	221.5 ± 0.2 ly (67.92 ± 0.06 pc)
Absolute magnitude (M_{V})	5.41

Orbit
Period (P)	0.4789961 d
Semi-major axis (a)	3.05±0.01 R_{☉}
Eccentricity (e)	0.0
Inclination (i)	79.81°
Periastron epoch (T)	2,453,821.6344±0.0002
Semi-amplitude (K_{1}) (primary)	124.74±0.28 km/s

Details

Primary
Mass	1.01±0.01 M_{☉}
Radius	1.22±0.01 R_{☉}
Luminosity	1.10±0.02 L_{☉}
Temperature	5,780 K

Secondary
Mass	0.65±0.01 M_{☉}
Radius	0.58±0.01 R_{☉}
Luminosity	0.09±0.01 L_{☉}
Temperature	3,850 K

Other designations
- XY UMa, AG+54 702, BD+55 1317, HD 237786, HIP 44998, SAO 27143, PPM 32024

Database references
SIMBAD	data

XY Ursae Majoris is a short period binary star system in the northern circumpolar constellation of Ursa Major. It is an eclipsing binary with a baseline apparent visual magnitude of 9.50. The system is located at a distance of 221.5 light years from the Sun based on parallax measurements, but is drifting closer with a radial velocity of −10 km/s. It has a relatively high proper motion, traversing the celestial sphere at the angular rate of 0.191″·yr^{−1}.

The variability of this system was discovered by W. Strohmeier and its period was determined by R. Kippenhahn, with the findings announced in 1955. It was found to be a detached eclipsing binary system, and by 1963 a variable primary component had been noted. E. H. Geyer made intermittent light curve studies of the system starting with its discovery up until 1975, ascribing variability in the light curve to star spot activity on the primary component. The orbital period of the pair was determined to be 0.479 d, with the orbital plane inclined at an angle of 79.84° to the line of sight from the Earth.

By 1990, enough data had been collected to identify a long term variation of the period, and it was hypothesized this was caused by a third body in the system orbiting the close binary. The orbital period of this component was estimated to be ~30 years in 2001, then refined to 26.7 years by 2010. If the orbital plane of this component is the same as the inner pair, its mass would be 18% of the mass of the Sun. An alternative solution to the period change suggests magnetic activity causes shifts in the angular momentum of the system, but this is considered less likely.

This is a double-lined spectroscopic binary star system with an orbital period of 11.5 h. The primary component is a G-type main-sequence star with a stellar classification of G2V. It is an RS Canum Venaticorum-type variable that is magnetically active and a bright X-ray source. Despite this, relatively few optical flares have been observed. The cooler secondary is a K-type main-sequence star of class K5V that is smaller and less massive than the primary.
