= Karin Lind =

Swedish astronomer

Karin Lind is a Swedish astronomer whose research involves spectroscopy of stars in order to determine their chemical composition, and the use of this information to understand the origin of heavy elements in supernova explosions and the way radiation and energy moves through stellar atmospheres. Her work has in particular clarified the roles of Big Bang nucleosynthesis and supernovas in producing the quantities of lithium observed in early stars. She is an associate professor in the Department of Astronomy at Stockholm University, and a participant and survey builder in the GALAH collaboration, which uses the Anglo-Australian Telescope's HERMES instrument to map the chemical compositions of stars in the Milky Way.

== Education and career ==
Lind was born in Sweden, and was raised in Motala. After an undergraduate degree at Uppsala University, and a 2007 master's degree, she traveled to Germany for doctoral study at the European Southern Observatory and Max Planck Institute for Astrophysics in Garching, near Munich. She completed her PhD through LMU Munich in 2010; her dissertation, Chemical analysis of globular star clusters : theory and observation, was jointly supervised by Francesca Primas and Martin Asplund.

She remained at the Max Planck Institute for Astrophysics as a postdoctoral researcher from 2010 to 2013, and continued her postdoctoral studies at the University of Cambridge in the UK from 2013 to 2014, before returning to Uppsala as a Marie-Curie Research Fellow in 2014. She became a group leader at the Max Planck Institute for Astronomy in Heidelberg for four years, from 2015 to 2019, before returning to Sweden in 2019 for her current position at Stockholm University.

== Recognition ==
As well as receiving a 2014 Marie Curie Fellowship, Lind was a 2015 recipient of the Sofia Kovalevskaya Award of the Alexander von Humboldt Foundation, funding her work as a group leader at the Max Planck Institute for Astronomy. She was the 2016 recipient of the Ludwig Biermann Award of the German Astronomical Society.

She was the 2023 recipient of the Strömer-Ferrnerska Award of the Royal Swedish Academy of Sciences, "for world-leading research in stellar spectroscopy to investigate the history of the Milky Way".
