= Joseph Hoyt =

Joseph Hoyt may refer to:

- Joseph Gibson Hoyt (1815–1862), first chancellor and professor of Greek at Washington University in St. Louis
- Joseph W. Hoyt (1840–1902), Wisconsin legislator
