= Markus Kissler-Patig =

German astronomer

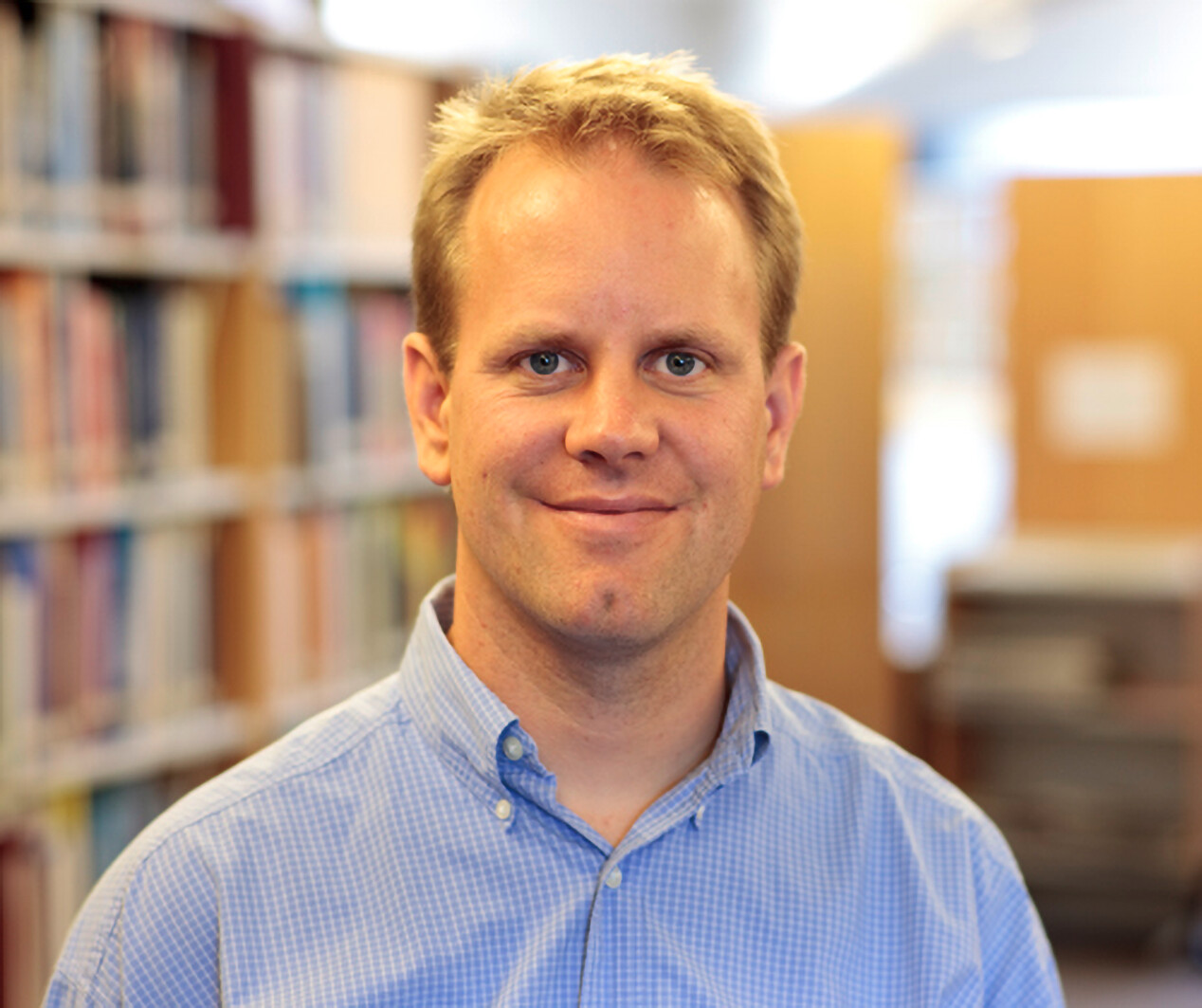
- Born: 21 August 1970 (age 55); Switzerland
- Awards: Ludwig Biermann Award (1999)
- Scientific career
- Fields: Astronomy
- Institutions: European Southern Observatory; Gemini Observatory

Markus Kissler-Patig (born 21 August 1970, in Switzerland) is a German astronomer, previously based at the European Southern Observatory in Garching, Germany. In August 2012, he was appointed director of the Gemini Observatory. From 2017 to 2019 he was deputy director for science at ESO and since 2019 he has been the head of science operations at ESA.

He specializes in the study of star clusters and galaxies.

In 1999, he was winner of the Ludwig Biermann Award of the German Astronomical Society in recognition of his work on extragalactic globular cluster systems.
