= Sh 2-294 =

Nebula

Sharpless 2-294
Nebula
- The Octopus Nebula in 2026

Observation data: J2000 epoch
- Right ascension: 07^{h} 16^{m} 35^{s}
- Declination: −09° 25′ 43″
- Distance: 3240 pc
- Apparent dimensions (V): 7'
- Constellation: Monoceros
- Designations: ALS 18684, Gaze-Shajn 115, Strohmeier 8, [YDD2008] 717

Sh 2-294, also known as the Octopus Nebula, is a nebula in Monoceros. It was discovered by Wolfgang Strohmeier in 1950, during a photographic survey.

== Structure ==
It is ionized by a single B0 star, MFJ Sh 2-294 4. It has an unusual amount of dust, and is uncommonly red. A star cluster has begun to form in the nebula, with star formation caused by the expansion of the nebula. The nebula contains 38 known young stellar objects, as observed by the Spitzer Space Telescope.
