= 4349 Tibúrcio =

Asteroid

Discovery
- Discovered by: W. Landgraf
- Discovery site: La Silla Obs.
- Discovery date: 5 June 1989

Designations
- Named after: Júlio Tibúrcio (Brazilian amateur astronomer)
- Alternative designations: 1989 LX · 1931 AE; 1951 YV_{1} · 1959 SS; 1968 WD · 1982 BJ_{4} 1984 MJ · 1986 AZ_{2}
- Minor planet category: main-belt · (middle)

Orbital characteristics
- Epoch 4 September 2017 (JD 2458000.5)
- Uncertainty parameter 0
- Observation arc: 86.31 yr (31,526 days)
- Aphelion: 3.2534 AU
- Perihelion: 1.9884 AU
- Semi-major axis: 2.6209 AU
- Eccentricity: 0.2413
- Orbital period (sidereal): 4.24 yr (1,550 days)
- Mean anomaly: 230.56°
- Mean motion: 0° 13^{m} 56.28^{s} / day
- Inclination: 10.740°
- Longitude of ascending node: 90.259°
- Argument of perihelion: 281.06°

Physical characteristics
- Dimensions: 24.91±0.28 km 26.12 km (derived); 26.14±1.8 km (IRAS:4); 26.397±0.117; 26.45±10.54 km 28.091±0.371 km 29.67±8.21 km 30.23±7.05 km
- Synodic rotation period: 16.284±0.003 h (Note: Higgins (2011) web: rotation period 16.284±0.003 hours with a brightness amplitude of 0.40 mag. Quality Code (U) of 3 (Denotes a secure result within the precision given and no ambiguity.). Summary figures for (4349) Tiburcio at Collaborative Asteroid Lightcurve Link (CALL))
- Geometric albedo: 0.0345±0.0053; 0.035±0.004; 0.040±0.041; 0.04±0.02; 0.04±0.01; 0.0493 (derived); 0.0540±0.008 (IRAS:4); 0.061±0.002
- Spectral type: X · S
- Absolute magnitude (H): 11.7 · 11.8 · 11.94±0.44 · 12.00 · 12.11

4349 Tibúrcio, provisional designation 1989 LX, is a dark asteroid from the central region of the asteroid belt, approximately 29 kilometers in diameter. It was discovered on 5 June 1989, by German astronomer Werner Landgraf at ESO's La Silla Observatory in northern Chile.

With 53.5°, it had been the asteroid with the smallest angular distance from the Sun ever discovered. It was later named after Brazilian amateur astronomer Júlio Tibúrcio.

== Orbit and classification ==
Tibúrcio orbits the Sun in the central main-belt at a distance of 2.0–3.3 AU once every 4 years and 3 months (1,550 days). Its orbit has an eccentricity of 0.24 and an inclination of 11° with respect to the ecliptic.

One day before its first identification as 1931 AE, a precovery was taken at Lowell Observatory in 1931, extending the body's observation arc by 58 years prior to its official discovery at La Silla.

== Physical characteristics ==
The asteroid has been characterized as an X-type asteroid by Pan-STARRS' large-scale photometric survey.

=== Rotation period ===
A rotational lightcurve of Tibúrcio was obtained from photometric observations by astronomer David Higgins at the Australian Hunters Hill Observatory (E14) in October 2010. Lightcurve analysis gave a well-defined rotation period of 16.284 hours with a brightness variation of 0.40 magnitude (U=3).

=== Diameter and albedo ===
According to the space-based surveys carried out by the Infrared Astronomical Satellite IRAS, the Japanese Akari satellite, and NASA's Wide-field Infrared Survey Explorer with its NEOWISE mission, Tibúrcio measures between 24.9 and 30.23 kilometers in diameter, and its surface has a low albedo between 0.034 and 0.061.

Collaborative Asteroid Lightcurve Link assumes an albedo of 0.049 and calculates a diameter of 26.1 kilometers with an absolute magnitude of 11.8.

== Naming ==
This minor planet was named after Brazilian amateur astronomer and student of information science, Júlio César dos Santos Tibúrcio. The official naming citation was published by the Minor Planet Center on 8 June 1990 (M.P.C. 16445).
