= William Chauvenet =

American academic (1820–1870)

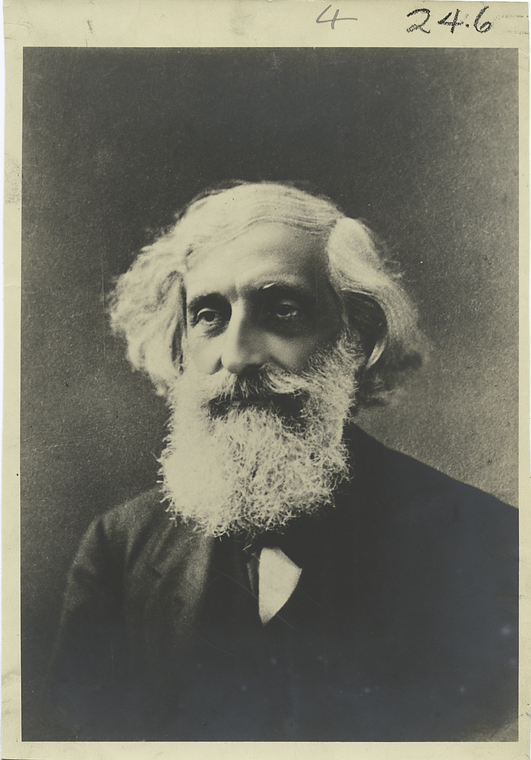
William Chauvenet

William Chauvenet (24 May 1820 – 13 December 1870) was a professor of mathematics, astronomy, navigation, and surveying who was instrumental in the establishment of the U.S. Naval Academy at Annapolis, Maryland, and later the second chancellor of Washington University in St. Louis.

== Early life ==
William Chauvenet was born on a farm near Milford, Pennsylvania to Guillaume Marc Chauvenet, a former soldier of Napoleon's army who reconverted in silk trade after the Emperor's fall, and Mary B. Kerr and was raised in Philadelphia. He entered Yale University at age 16, and graduated in 1840 with high honors. While at Yale, Chauvenet contributed to the school newspaper and was a pianist with the Beethoven Society. He was one of eight founding members of the Skull and Bones Society.

=== United States Navy ===
In 1841, he was appointed a professor of mathematics in the United States Navy, and for a while served on the USS Mississippi teaching math. His professorship led Chauvenet to see the necessity of a United States naval academy. While others had proposed the idea, no one had actually seen it through. In 1842, he was appointed head of the naval asylum in Philadelphia, Pennsylvania. At the Naval Asylum, prospective officers took an eight-month course before sailing. Chauvenet felt the course was lacking and drew up his own plan for a two-year course. After being presented to several secretaries of the navy, the course was finally accepted in 1845.

He was instrumental in the 1845 founding of the United States Naval Academy at Annapolis, Maryland, and taught there for years. He was president of the academic board and in 1851 was part of a board that recommended the course of study be extended to four years. Chauvenet taught in many subjects, including mathematics, surveying, astronomy, and navigation. He helped to establish an astronomical observatory at the naval academy. Chauvenet's contributions were so important that in 1890, Admiral S.R. Franklin proclaimed him "Father of the Naval Academy". A bronze plaque with this inscription was installed in 1916, at the behest of Congress.

In 1855, he declined Yale's offer of a professorship of mathematics to continue working at the Naval Academy in Annapolis.

=== Washington University ===
In 1859, Yale again came calling, offering this time the professorship of astronomy and natural philosophy. Instead, Chauvenet took a job offered by Washington University in St. Louis: professor of mathematics and astronomy. He brought with him a deep love of music and a familiarity with the classics, in addition to being an outstanding figure in the world of science, noted by many historians as one of the foremost mathematical minds in the U.S. before the Civil War. It was Chauvenet who mathematically confirmed James B. Eads' plans for the first bridge to span the Mississippi River at St. Louis. The directors of the University chose him to be chancellor after his friend and Yale classmate Joseph Hoyt died in 1861. He came to his chancellorship in the midst of the Civil War in a state divided by the question of slavery.

Washington University grew during his chancellorship, adding dozens of professors, hundreds of students, and several new programs, including the law school in 1867. He served as vice president of the United States National Academy of Sciences and president of the American Association for the Advancement of Science, and was a member of both the American Philosophical Society and the American Academy of Arts and Sciences.

Chauvenet authored many treatises and textbooks, including A Manual of Spherical and Practical Astronomy and Theory of the Ribbed Arch. The calculations of Chauvenet and Charles Pfeiffer were used by James Buchanan Eads in designing and building the Eads Bridge in St. Louis.

Chauvenet served as chancellor until his death in 1870. William Greenleaf Eliot, founder of Washington University, succeeded him as chancellor. Chauvenet died in St. Paul, Minnesota, and was buried at Bellefontaine Cemetery in St. Louis.

== Posthumous honors ==
After his death, the Mathematical Association of America established a prestigious prize in his honor, the Chauvenet Prize; the Naval Academy named a mathematics building for him; and the U.S. Navy christened two ships after him, USS Chauvenet (AGS-11) and Chauvenet (AGS 29). The Chauvenet crater on the Moon is named after him as well. Mount Chauvenet in the Rocky Mountains is named after him.

== Cultural references ==
Chauvenet is referenced in NCIS: Los Angeles, S6, E2, as the name of a Deep Net site.

== See also ==
- Besselian elements
- Chauvenet's criterion
