= Lane (crater) =

Crater on the Moon

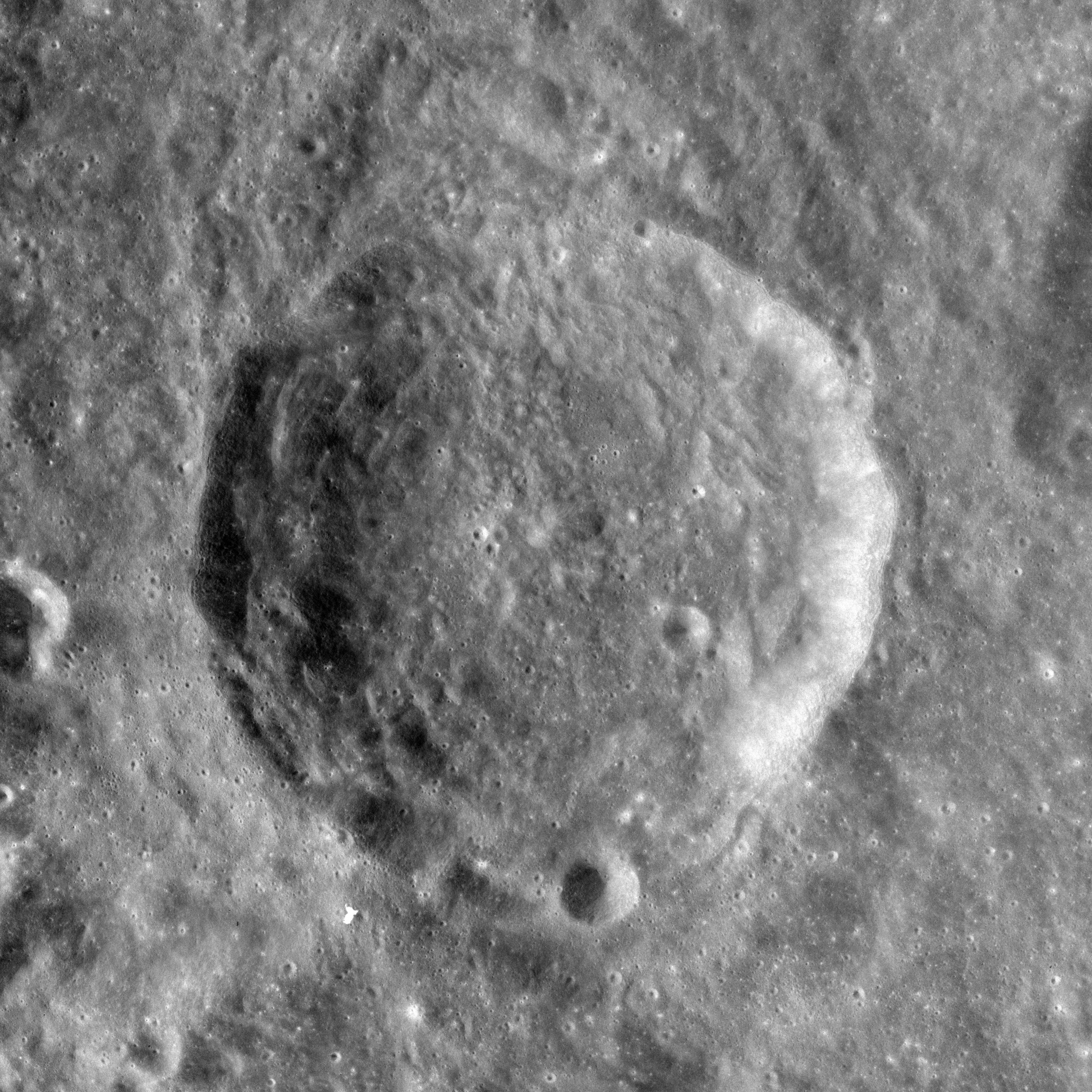
- Apollo 17 Mapping Camera image
- Coordinates: 9.50°S 132.36°E
- Diameter: 53.76 km (33.40 mi)
- Depth: Unknown
- Colongitude: 84° at sunrise
- Eponym: Jonathan H. Lane

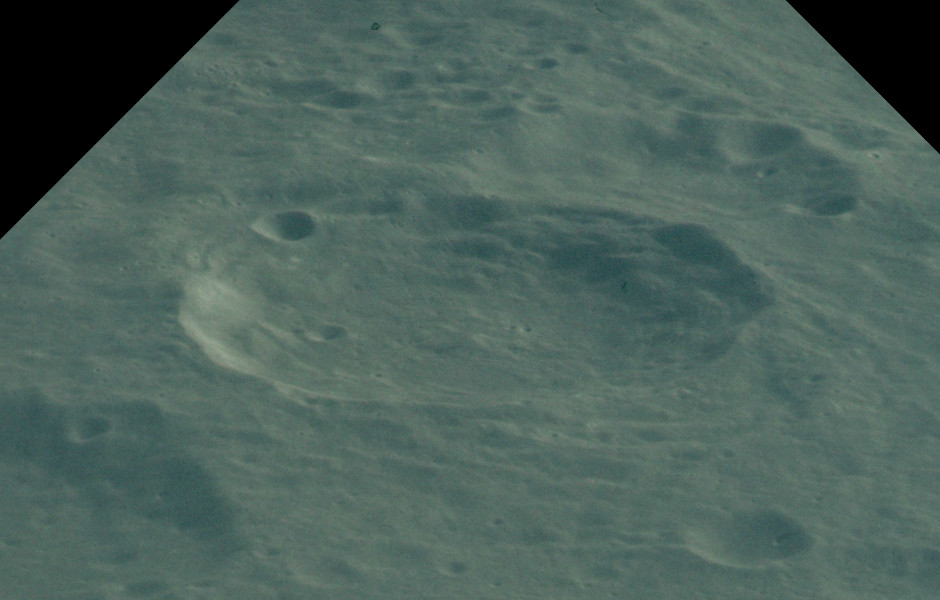
Oblique view from Apollo 13

Lane is a lunar impact crater. It lies on the far side of the Moon, just to the west of the crater Ten Bruggencate. To the west of Lane is Perepelkin, and to the northwest lies Love.

This crater is not heavily eroded, but the rim is somewhat disrupted at the northern and southern ends. To the south the rim has a prominent outward bulge that extends an extra 5–10 km. The interior is somewhat uneven, with low central ridges near the midpoint.

The crater was named after American astrophysicist Jonathan Homer Lane by the IAU in 1970. The crater was known as Crater 287 prior to naming.

== Satellite craters ==
By convention these features are identified on lunar maps by placing the letter on the side of the crater midpoint that is closest to Lane.

Lane	Latitude	Longitude	Diameter
B	7.5° S	132.9° E	13 km
S	9.7° S	130.7° E	35 km
