= Ten Bruggencate (crater) =

Lunar crater

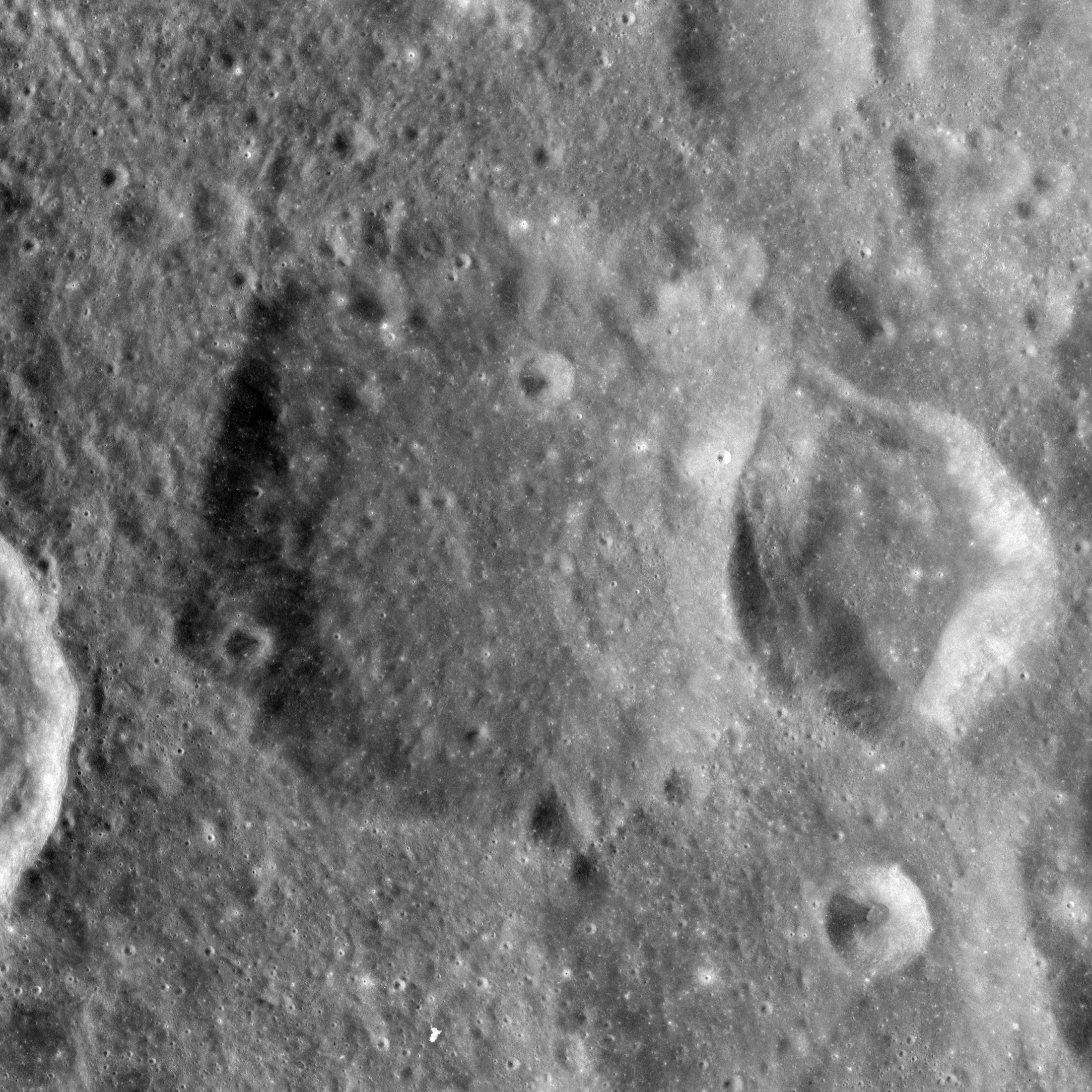
- Apollo 17 Mapping Camera image
- Coordinates: 9.58°S 134.66°E
- Diameter: 59.95 km (37.25 mi)
- Depth: Unknown
- Colongitude: 226° at sunrise
- Eponym: Paul ten Bruggencate

Ten Bruggencate is a lunar impact crater that lies on the far side of the Moon from the Earth, just to the east of the younger crater Lane. To the southeast of Ten Bruggencate is Chauvenet.

This is a worn and eroded formation, with the satellite crater Ten Bruggencate H overlapping part of the side to the east-southeast. There are several small craters along the inner wall and the edges of the interior floor. The crater is otherwise relatively featureless and unremarkable.

The crater was named after German astronomer Paul ten Bruggencate by the IAU in 1970. The crater was known as Crater 288 prior to naming.

== Satellite craters ==
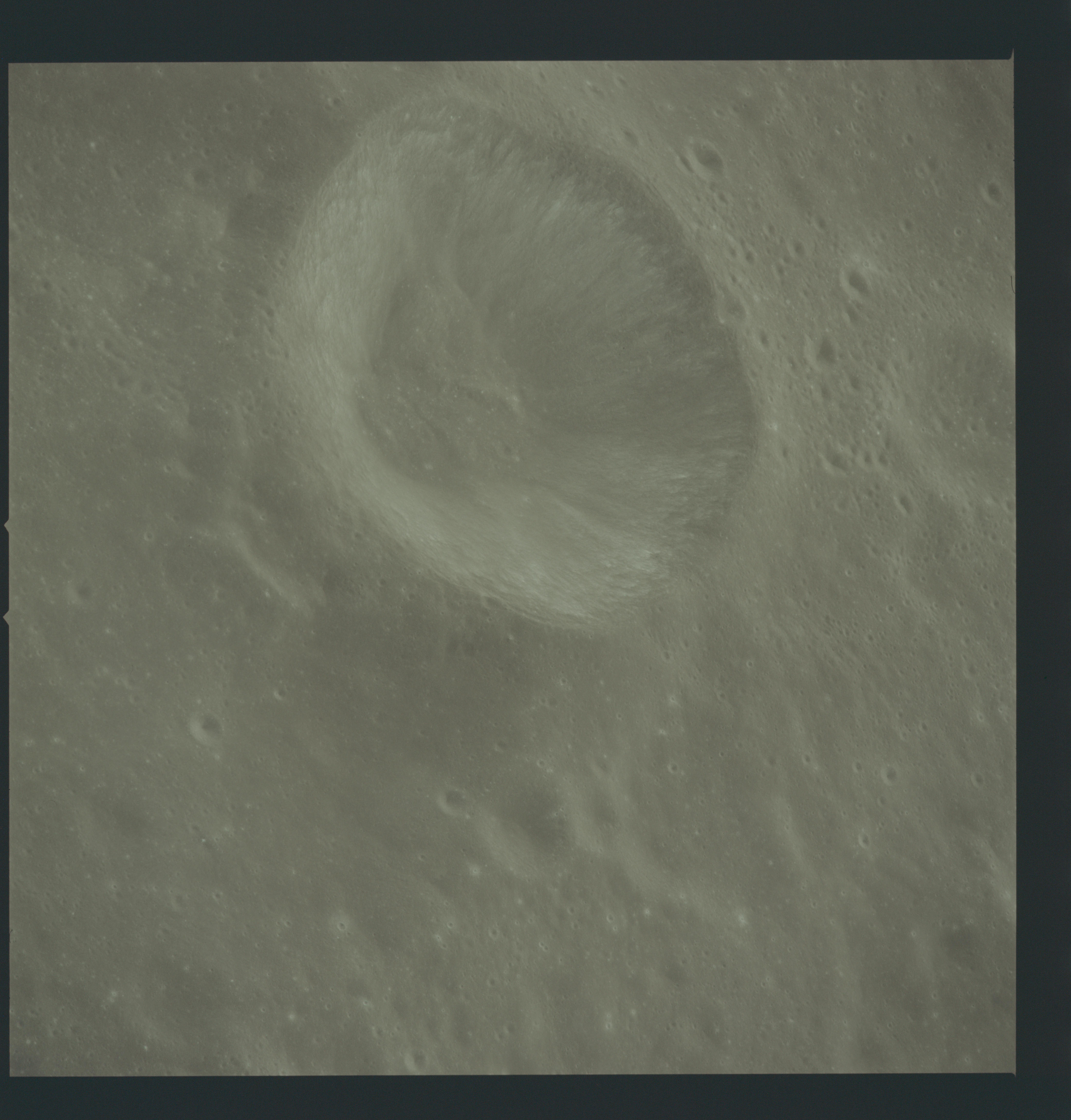
Ten Bruggencate C crater from Apollo 17

By convention these features are identified on lunar maps by placing the letter on the side of the crater midpoint that is closest to Ten Bruggencate.

Ten Bruggencate	Latitude	Longitude	Diameter
C	7.9° S	136.1° E	19 km
D	8.1° S	136.9° E	43 km
H	10.0° S	135.6° E	33 km
Y	6.7° S	134.0° E	57 km
