= Hans-Heinrich Voigt =

German astronomer

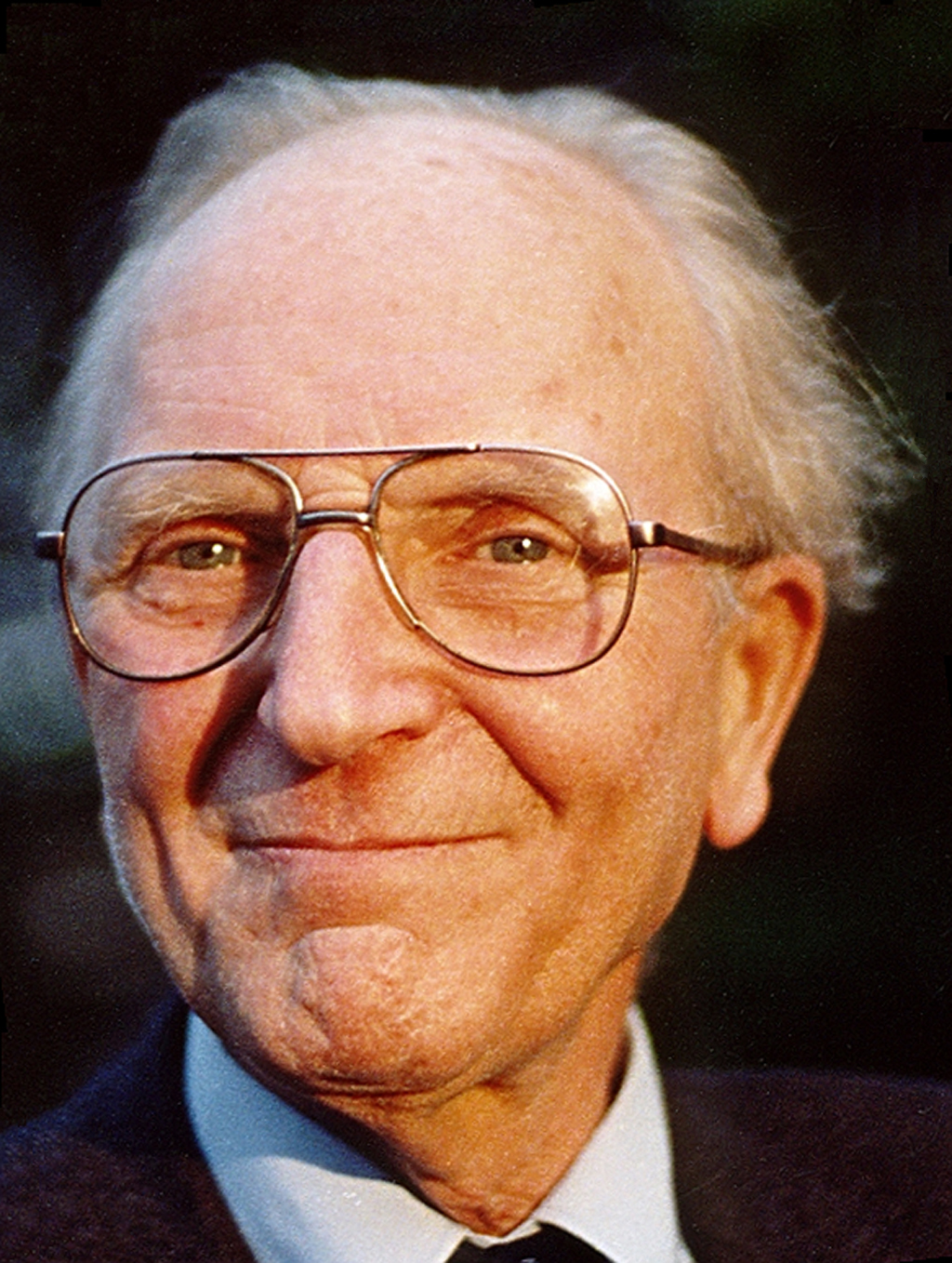
- Voigt in 1993
- Born: April 18, 1921; Eitzendorf, Germany
- Died: November 17, 2017 (aged 96); Göttingen, Germany
- Known for: Abriß der Astronomie
- Awards: Carl-Friedrich-Gauß- Medaille (1993); Göttinger Akademie der Wissenschaften member
- Scientific career
- Fields: Astronomy, Astrophysics
- Workplaces: Göttingen Observatory
- Thesis: Dämpfung und Mitte-Rand-Variation der Flügel der Mg-Serie 3^{1}P-n^{1}D auf der Sonne
- Doctoral advisor: Paul ten Bruggencate
- Doctoral students: Werner Landgraf

Hans-Heinrich Voigt (18 April 1921 – 17 November 2017) was a German astronomer and director of the Göttingen Observatory.

Voigt was ordinary professor of astronomy at the University of Göttingen and directed the Göttingen Observatory from 1963 to 1986, when he retired. He was a member of the Göttingen Academy of Sciences and its president from 1978 to 1979. In 1993 he received the Carl Friedrich Gauss Medal.

He died on 17 November 2017 at the age of 96 in Göttingen. In 1988 an asteroid was named 4378 Voigt after him.

== Works ==
- Outline of Astronomy (1974)
- Das Universum (1994)
- Abriß der Astronomie (2012)
