= Werner Landgraf =

German astrophysicist

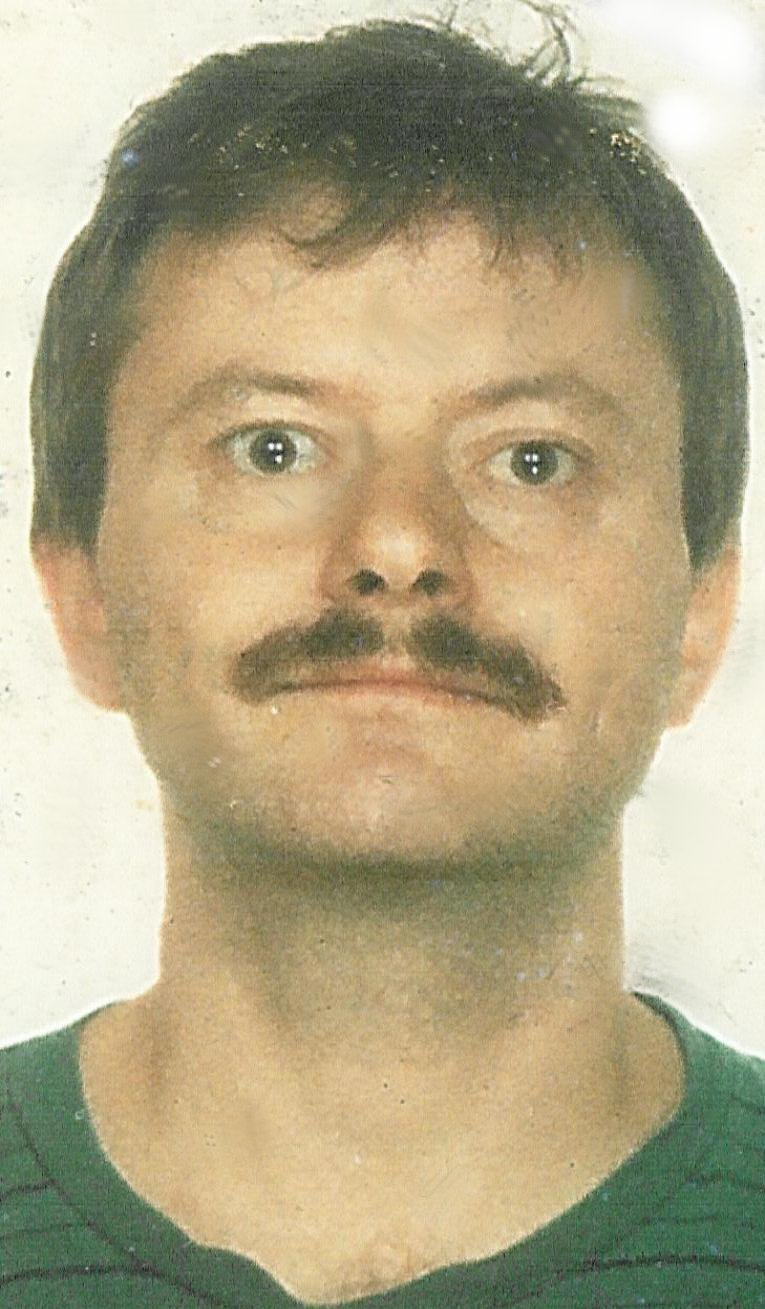
- Werner Landgraf (1991)
- Born: July 29, 1959 (age 66); Mainz, Germany
- Awards: 3132 Landgraf
- Scientific career
- Fields: Astrophysics, Cosmology, Fundamental Physics
- Thesis: Nichtgravitative Kräfte beim Halleyschen Kometen (1988)
- Doctoral advisor: Hans-Heinrich Voigt

Werner Landgraf (born 29 July 1959, in Mainz) is a German astrophysicist and a discoverer of minor planets.

== Life ==
W. Landgraf studied physics at the University of Siegen in 1977 and was working on his first astronomical projects. His earliest work was very inspired by Brian G. Marsden and Victor Shor. Two years later, he joined the Department of Astrophysics of University of Göttingen. There he presented his thesis The calculation of atmospheric models and line profiles for the analysis of stellar spectra. He graduated from the university in 1983, and then he worked until 1988 on his dissertation Nongravitational forces of Comet Halley, under supervision by Hans-Heinrich Voigt.

In 1986, W. Landgraf received a teaching position at the University of Siegen. In addition to the main lecture about astronomy and astrophysics, he gave lectures also on solar system objects and their motion, Relativity and Cosmology.

== Work ==
W. Landgraf's work mainly concerns the verification and determination of astronomical constants of the reference system, the masses of the planets, non-gravitational forces and the verification of the gravitational law within the Solar System. He developed and improved methods for identifying and calculating the orbits of different objects in the Solar System. He busied himself in this work with numerous minor planets with emphasis on the near-Earth asteroids, comets, their long term dynamics, and with the observation of small planets and comets.

He also developed a method of eliminating systematic errors in positioning brighter comets that resulted in a more accurate prediction of the Halley's Comet. A recalculation of the path of Halley's comet to 2317 BC confirmed that the Greeks had already seen the comet on 466 B.C.

Minor planets discovered: 7
3683 Baumann	23 June 1987
4349 Tibúrcio	5 June 1989
4378 Voigt	14 May 1988
7696 Liebe	10 May 1988
9938 Kretlow	14 May 1988
17412 Kroll	24 May 1988
29148 Palzer	10 May 1988

He discovered seven minor planets including 3683 Baumann, 4378 Voigt (named after Hans-Heinrich Voigt), 9938 Kretlow and 4349 Tibúrcio at ESO's La Silla Observatory in northern Chile.

He examined the properties, individuation and interaction of causets, which each starts from the affirmation that "everything what exists, acts" as its first element and as its sphere of validity successively produces really news, not predetermined by nor contained in and linear independent from old, and that the earliest elements or occurred facts and their aftereffects appear as its internal logical, geometrical, physical properties (namely, the first and the next 1,2,4 ... elements of the same rank, represent its dimensions and corresponding primary natural forces). Applied to our real world, this would suggest that successive events, world points, and their actions already would be an own discrete first dimension and producing force, corresponding to proper time (inclusive a discrete variance and limited vality range of facts and their effects), followed by the similar time; a kinematic extension, and two equivalent curvature-defining geometric extensions. This makes plausible that the dimensions of the world increase proportionally to their elementary units, in a not-localizable manner, very classically and approximately corresponding to a radiation with a wavelength of about the world's size, keeping the biggest part of the world's energy, per each elementary space inclusive at any background or surface one such photon or information and a pressure canceling the gravitational deceleration of expansion.

== Honours ==
In 1987, asteroid 3132 Landgraf was named after him.
