= Chauvenet (crater) =

Lunar impact crater

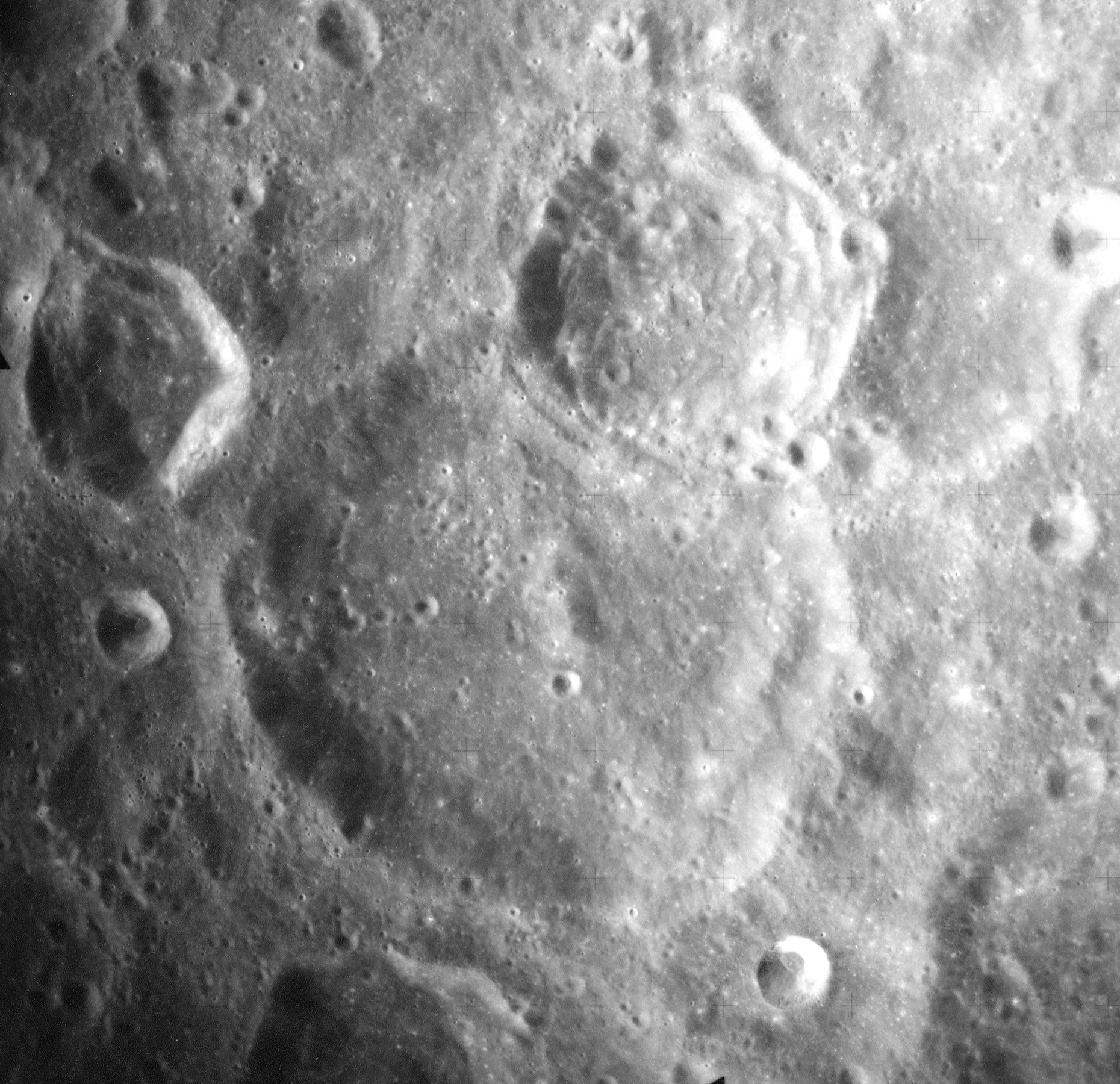
- Apollo 17 Mapping Camera image
- Coordinates: 11.64°S 137.20°E
- Diameter: 77.67 km (48.26 mi)
- Depth: Unknown
- Colongitude: 224° at sunrise
- Formation: Nectarian
- Eponym: William Chauvenet

Chauvenet is a lunar impact crater that is located to the northeast of the prominent crater Tsiolkovskiy on the far side of the Moon. Less than one crater diameter to the northwest of Chauvenet is the crater Ten Bruggencate.

This formation is dated to the Nectarian period of the lunar geologic timescale. The rim is roughly circular, with the satellite crater Chauvenet C overlying the northeastern side and intruding into the interior. A ridge runs from the western side of this intruding feature to the midpoint of the interior of Chauvenet, where it forms a central peak. The remainder of the floor is marked only by a number of tiny craters. There is a shelf of slumped material forming a terrace along the southeast inner wall. The remainder of the inner wall is somewhat irregular in form.

The crater was named after American astronomer and mathematician William Chauvenet (1820-1870). Its designation was formally adopted by the International Astronomical Union in 1970. The crater was identified as Crater 290 prior to naming.

== Satellite craters ==
By convention these features are identified on lunar maps by placing the letter on the side of the crater midpoint that is closest to Chauvenet.

Chauvenet	Latitude	Longitude	Diameter
C	10.4° S	138.0° E	48 km
D	10.6° S	139.7° E	14 km
E	11.4° S	140.7° E	27 km
G	12.7° S	141.0° E	26 km
J	13.9° S	139.3° E	77 km
L	13.3° S	137.5° E	10 km
P	14.5° S	135.8° E	12 km
Q	13.3° S	135.4° E	42 km
S	12.3° S	134.4° E	38 km
U	11.0° S	135.2° E	11 km

The name Cornielle was proposed for Chauvenet S crater, but it was not approved by the IAU.

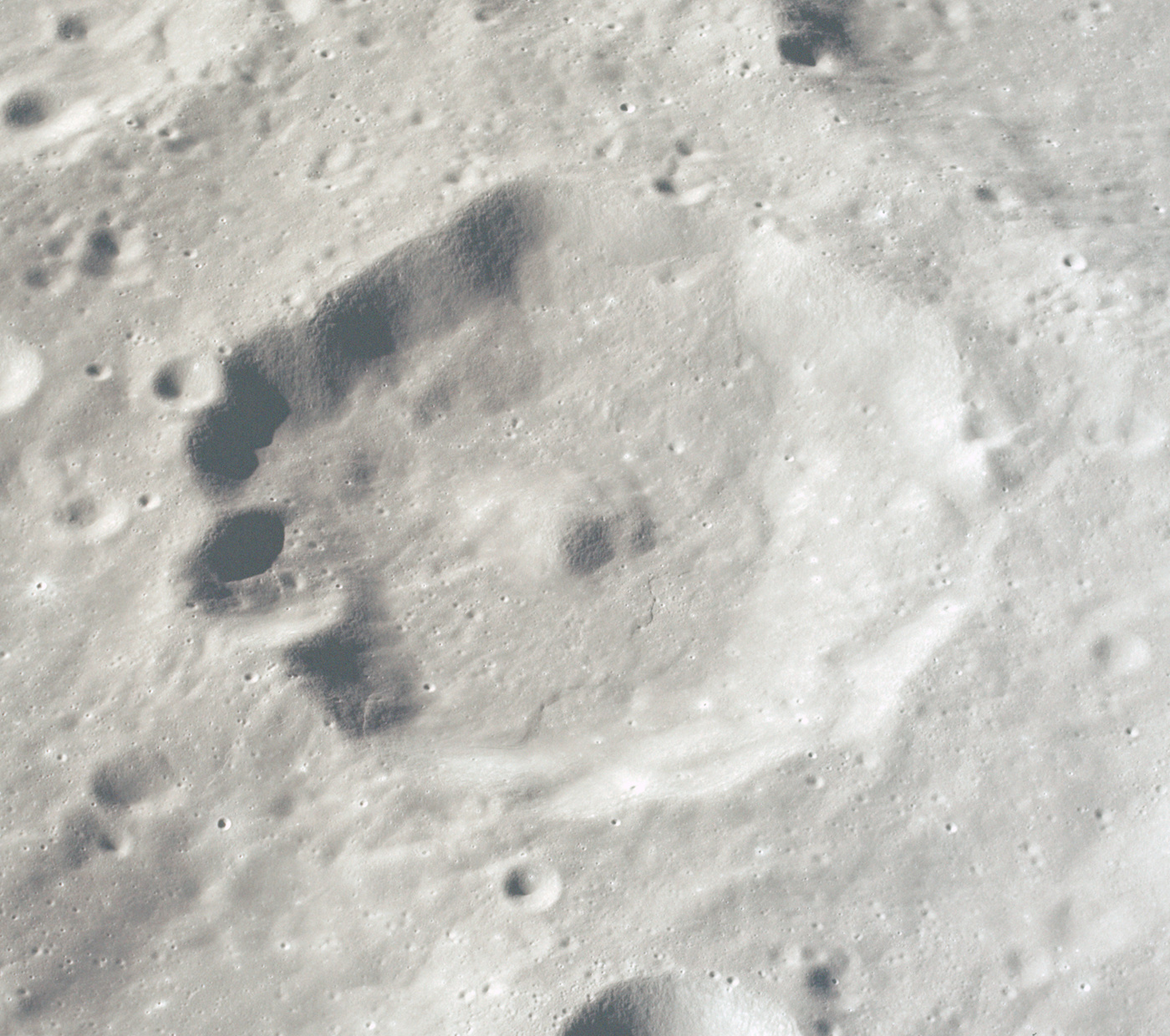
Oblique view of Chauvenet Q from Apollo 17
