= Göttingen Observatory =

Astronomical observatory in Germany

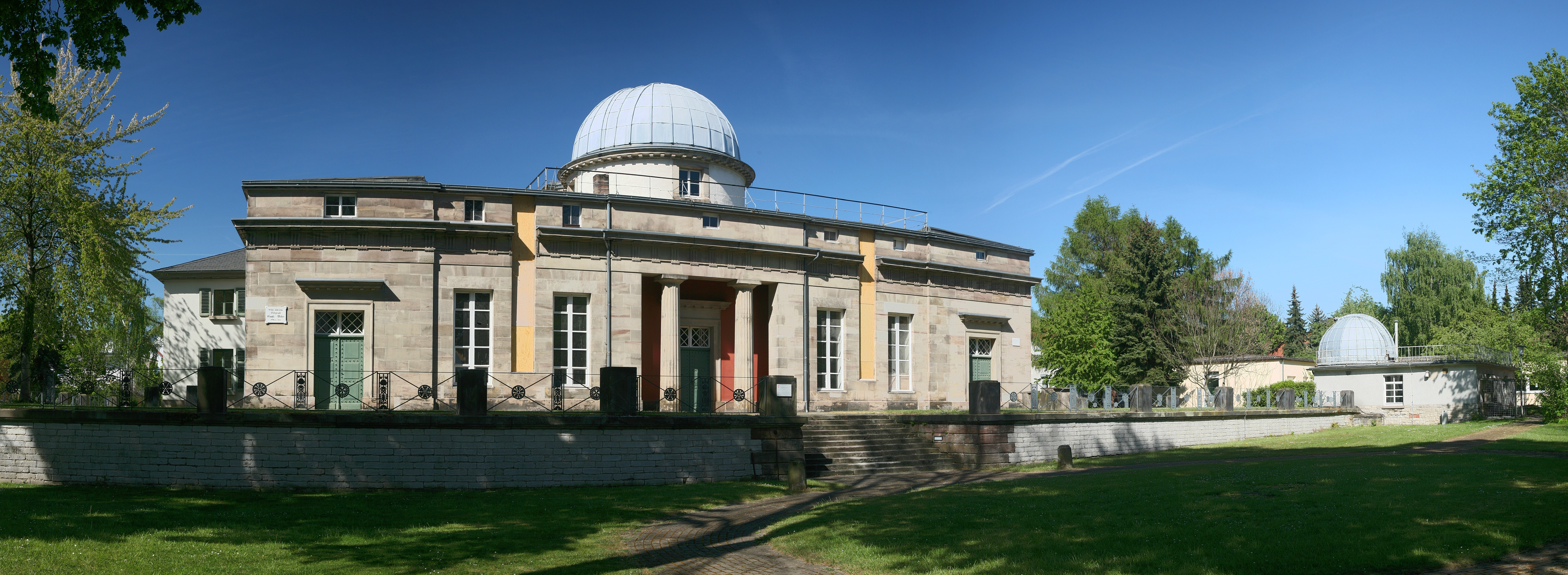
- Alternative names: Göttingen University Observatory
- Observatory code: 528
- Location: Göttingen, Germany
- Coordinates: 51°31′42.54″N 9°56′35.8″E
- Established: 1816
- Website: http://www.astro.physik.uni-goettingen.de/index.de.html
- Related media on Commons

Göttingen Observatory (Universitätssternwarte Göttingen (Göttingen University Observatory) or königliche Sternwarte Göttingen (Royal Observatory Göttingen)) is a German astronomical observatory located in Göttingen, Lower Saxony, Germany.

== History ==
In 1802, George III of the United Kingdom, who was also the prince-elector of Hanover, allocated 22,680 thalers for a new observatory. The plans were developed, like many of the university's buildings, by Georg Heinrich Borheck. Construction was delayed by the French Revolutionary Wars and extended from 1803 until 1816. At the time, the building was on the outskirts of Göttingen, to ensure an unobstructed view of the night sky.

Carl Friedrich Gauss became the first director of the Observatory, and lived there between 1815 and 1855. Gauss arranged for the installation of two meridian circles (produced by Johann Georg Repsold and Georg Friedrich von Reichenbach in 1818 and 1819.

Gauss was succeeded by Wilhelm Weber and Peter Gustav Lejeune Dirichlet, who served as provisional directors (though neither was an astronomer), and Dirichlet was replaced, upon his death, by Gauss's former assistant, Ernst Friedrich Wilhelm Klinkerfues. In 1868, the research institution was divided into theoretical and practical sections. Klinkerfues continued to run the observatory until his death in 1884, after which directorship passed on to Wilhelm Schur in 1886. Throughout 1887/1888 Schur led a complete redevelopment of the observatory. Major projects included the renewal of the main hall's roof and the replacement of the outdated dome. In contrast to his predecessor, Klinkerfues, Schur was very successful in modernizing the inadequate equipment of the observatory, acquiring a new, large Repsold heliometer in 1888. He also, with the help of an assistant, catalogued and organised over 11,000 books and brochures in the observatory's library over a period of a year and a half, finishing in 1899.

Following Schur's death, Karl Schwarzschild assumed the position in 1901 and was succeeded first by Johannes Franz Hartmann and then by Hans Kienle, Paul ten Bruggencate, Hans-Heinrich Voigt, Rudolf Kippenhahn, Klaus Fricke, Klaus Beuermann, and finally Stefan Dreizler.

=== Outposts ===
To improve observations, a new observatory was planned on the Hainberg, a small hill south east of Göttingen. After the opening of a new observatory there in 1929, the instruments were transferred from Göttingen to this new location. Due to the construction of a new telescope at Hainberg, observations at Göttingen Observatory were halted in 1933.

In 1941, during World War II, Paul ten Bruggencate became the director of the Göttingen University Observatory. In pursuit of his interest in observing the Sun, he looked for a new solar telescope. With the help of the military, he was able to build a solar telescope near the already existing telescope at Hainberg. Unsatisfied with the cloudy weather conditions in Germany, ten Bruggencate established another solar observatory in Switzerland: the Locarno Observatory was planned and built in the late 1950s. It was closed in 1984 and the equipment was transferred to the Teide Observatory in Tenerife, Spain, where the University of Göttingen now shares the operation of several solar telescopes.

=== Further use ===
The institute was later directed by Hans-Heinrich Voigt, Rudolf Kippenhahn, Klaus Fricke, Klaus Beuermann and finally, by Stefan Dreizler.

After renovations, most recently in 2008, the observatory building was restored to its original appearance.

Since 2009, the Observatory has housed the Lichtenberg-Kolleg Institute for Advanced Study.

== See also ==
- Karl-Otto Kiepenheuer
- Hans-Heinrich Voigt
- List of astronomical observatories
