= Wolfgang Strohmeier =

- Born: 13 January 1913; Kassel
- Died: 26 March 2004 (aged 91); Bamberg
- Occupation: Astronomer
- Years active: 1944-1978
- Known for: Variable Star Research, Astronomical Surveys

Wolfgang Strohmeier (13 January 1913 - 26 March 2004) was a German astronomer.

He attended the Friedrich Wilhelms University of Berlin for a degree in astronomy from 1932 until his graduation in 1938. His graduating thesis was on spectrophotometric investigations on red-colored stars. He was drafted into the Wehrmacht during the second world war. After being wounded, in 1944, he worked at Göttingen Observatory.

He was director of the Remeis Observatory in Bamberg from 1954 to 1978. He completely modernized the observatory. In 1962, he incorporated the observatory with the University of Erlangen-Nürnberg. In 1980, he was awarded the Federal Cross of Merit for his modernization of German astronomy. While at the observatory, he organized multiple surveys to catalog and study variable stars.

He is known for the discovery of the nebula Sh 2-294 in 1950.
