= Heidelberg-Königstuhl State Observatory =

Historic astronomical observatory in Heidelberg, Germany

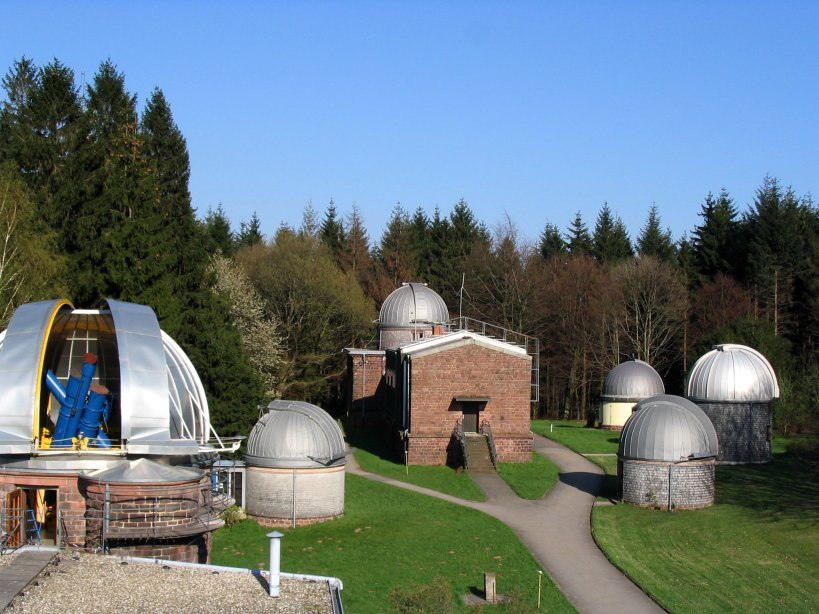
- Heidelberg-Königstuhl State Observatory
- Alternative names: Heidelberg State Observatory
- Organization: Heidelberg University
- Observatory code: 024
- Location: Heidelberg, Karlsruhe, Baden-Württemberg, Germany
- Coordinates: 49°23′55″N 8°43′15″E
- Altitude: 560 m (1,840 ft)
- Website: www.lsw.uni-heidelberg.de
- Location of Heidelberg-Königstuhl State Observatory
- Related media on Commons

Heidelberg-Königstuhl State Observatory (German: Landessternwarte Heidelberg-Königstuhl) is a historic astronomical observatory located near the summit of the Königstuhl hill in the city of Heidelberg in Germany. It is operated by the Center for Astronomy (ZAH) at the University of Heidelberg.

The predecessor of the current observatory was originally opened in 1774 in the nearby city of Mannheim but degradation of observational conditions there resulted in a relocation to the Königstuhl in 1898.

The Observatory facility have little value for current astronomical research of ZAH; research is done with the Gama Ray H.E.S.S in Namibia and ESO facilities in Chile.

Andreas Quirrenbach is the observatory's director since 2005.

== History ==
The instrumentation of the observatory originated from the Mannheim Observatory, founded in 1774. In 1880, the observatory was provisionally moved to Karlsruhe because the astronomical/atmospherical seeing conditions worsened. In subsequent years, three other locations were considered, with Heidelberg-Königstuhl finally being chosen.

On 20 June 1898, the "Großherzogliche Bergsternwarte" was ceremonially inaugurated by Frederick I, Grand Duke of Baden. The astronomical institute comprised two complementary departments, the astrophysical, led by Max Wolf, and the astrometrical led by Karl Wilhelm Valentiner. Valentiner was director of the Mannheim observatory and initiated the move to Karlsruhe. After Valentiner's retirement in 1909, both departments were placed under the administration of Max Wolf.

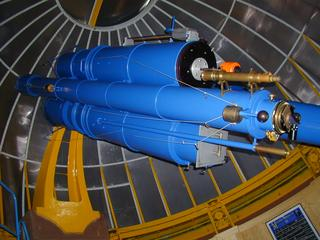
The Bruce double astrograph named after Catherine Wolfe Bruce

While the new observatory complex was still under construction Max Wolf obtained a grant of $10,000 from the American philanthropist Catherine Wolfe Bruce for the acquisition of a powerful new dual 16 in (41 cm) refractor telescope, the Bruce double astrograph. For many years this telescope was the observatory's main research instrument. He later obtained a grant to build the observatory's a 28 in (71 cm) reflector telescope, the observatory's first.

The main field of activity of the observatory was the investigation of nebulae and the search for asteroids. Wolf, his staff and his successors discovered over 800 asteroids, including the first trojan asteroid Achilles in 1906.

Between 1912 and 1957, Karl Wilhelm Reinmuth discovered almost 400 asteroids from the Heidelberg-Königstuhl State Observatory.

The observatory ceased to be run by the German federal government in 2005 when it was joined with the Institute of Theoretical Astrophysics and Astronomical Calculation Institute to make up the Center of Astronomy of the University of Heidelberg.

== See also ==
- List of astronomical observatories
