= Maryam Modjaz =

German-American astrophysicist

- Education: Center for Astrophysics | Harvard & Smithsonian; Harvard University; University of California, Berkeley]
- Scientific career
- Workplaces: University of California, Berkeley]
- Thesis: Varied deaths of massive stars : properties of nearby Type IIb, Ib and Ic supernovae (2007)

Maryam Modjaz is a German-American astrophysicist who was a professor at the New York University from 2011 till 2022, after which she moved to the Astronomy Department of the University of Virginia. Her research encompasses observational aspects of the death of massive stars. She was awarded an Alexander von Humboldt Foundation Fellowship in 2018, which she spent at the Max Planck Institute for Astronomy.

== Early life and education ==
Modjaz grew up in Germany. It was as a child in Germany that she first looked through a telescope. She was an undergraduate student at the University of California, Berkeley. She completed an undergraduate research project under the supervision of Alex Filippenko, during which she studied Type Ia supernova. She was at the Lick Observatory when she made her first observation of a supernova.. She moved to Harvard University for her graduate studies, where she worked on the deaths of massive stars (including Type Ic supernova). Her doctoral research was supervised by Robert Kirshner, and was recognized with the Fireman Prize as one of the most outstanding dissertations at the Center for Astrophysics | Harvard & Smithsonian.

== Research and career ==
Modjaz is interested in both experimental observations and theoretical predictions of star death. After graduating, she was a Miller fellow at the University of California, Berkeley, where she worked alongside Filippenko and Joshua Bloom. She spent one year as a Hubble Postdoctoral Fellow at Columbia University. She was awarded the 2010 Ludwig-Biermann Award. Modjaz was appointed to the faculty at New York University in 2011, where she joined the Center for Cosmology and Particle Physics. She was awarded an National Science Foundation CAREER Award in 2014.

Modjaz has continued to study supernova with the Large Synoptic Survey Telescope.

== Selected publications ==
- Weidong Li; Jesse Leaman; Ryan Chornock; et al. (24 March 2011). "Nearby supernova rates from the Lick Observatory Supernova Search - II. The observed luminosity functions and fractions of supernovae in a complete sample". Monthly Notices of the Royal Astronomical Society. 412 (3): 1441–1472. arXiv:1006.4612. Bibcode:2011MNRAS.412.1441L. doi:10.1111/j.1365-2966.2011.18160.x. ISSN 0035-8711. Wikidata Q56061258.
- Malcolm Hicken; Peter Challis; Saurabh Jha; et al. (1 July 2009). "CfA3: 185 Type Ia Supernova Light Curves from the CfA". The Astrophysical Journal. 700 (1): 331–357. arXiv:0901.4787. Bibcode:2009ApJ...700..331H. doi:10.1088/0004-637x/700/1/331. ISSN 0004-637X. Wikidata Q59883388.
- Modjaz M.; Kewley L.; Kirshner R. P.; et al. (2008). "Measured metallicities at the sites of nearby broad-lined type IC supernovae and implications for the supernovae gamma-ray burst connection". The Astronomical Journal. 135: 1136–1150. arXiv:astro-ph/0701246. Bibcode:2008AJ....135.1136M. doi:10.1088/0004-6256/135/4/1136. ISSN 0004-6256. Wikidata Q68443532.

== Personal life ==
Modjaz is interested in science fiction.
