= Joseph Gibson Hoyt =

American educator (1815–1862)

- Born: January 19, 1815; Dunbarton, New Hampshire, U.S.
- Died: November 26, 1862 (aged 47); St. Louis, Missouri, U.S.
- Resting place: Exeter, New Hampshire, U.S.
- Occupation: Educator
- Title: Chancellor of Washington University in St. Louis
- Term: 1858–1862
- Predecessor: Position created
- Successor: William Chauvenet

Joseph Gibson Hoyt (January 19, 1815 – November 26, 1862) was the first chancellor and a professor of Greek at Washington University in St. Louis (then named Washington Institute in St. Louis) from 1858 to 1862.

== Early life ==
Joseph Gibson Hoyt was born on January 19, 1815, in Dunbarton, New Hampshire. Up until the age of 16, he only attended school for three months in a year to support his family's farm. He worked as an assistant teacher and attended schools in Hopkinton, New Hampshire, and Andover, Massachusetts. He graduated from Yale University in 1840 as number six in his class of 100. He was editor of the Yale Literary Magazine and president of Brothers in Unity. He was a member of Skull and Bones.

== Career ==
Following graduation, Hoyt took charge of a school in Plymouth, New Hampshire, in the spring of 1840. In 1841, he became an instructor in mathematics and natural philosophy at Phillips Exeter Academy. He remained there until 1858. During this period, he designed buildings and furnishings in the town of Exeter.

In 1851, Hoyt helped revise the Constitution of New Hampshire. In 1858, he missed a nomination for the U.S. Congress. In December 1859, Hoyt was offered the role of chancellor at the Washington University in St. Louis. In 1859, Hoyt became chancellor and a professor of Greek at the college. He helped define a liberal arts curriculum that lasted into the 1890s and hiring a full-time faculty for the college. During his tenure, a female seminary, Mary Institute was organized in 1859. In September 1861, the second building, Collegiate Hall, was completed. He hired his Yale classmate William Chauvenet as the chair of mathematics and astronomy. Chauvenet would succeed Hoyt as chancellor.

== Personal life ==
Hoyt died of complications of tuberculosis on November 26, 1862, in St. Louis. He was buried in Exeter.

== Legacy and awards ==
In 1859, Hoyt received an honorary Doctor of Laws degree from Dartmouth College. Hoyt Hall, a dormitory at Phillips Exeter Academy, is named for Hoyt. A large plaque on the building reads, "In memory of Joseph Gibson Hoyt, the great teacher."
