= Astronomische Gesellschaft =

German astronomical association

Logo

The Astronomische Gesellschaft is an astronomical society established in 1863 in Heidelberg, the second oldest astronomical society after the Royal Astronomical Society.

== History ==
In 1882, the Astronomische Gesellschaft founded the Central Bureau for Astronomical Telegrams at Kiel, where it remained until during World War I when it was moved to the Østervold Observatory at Copenhagen, Denmark, to be operated there by the Copenhagen University Observatory.

Around the turn of the 20th century the A.G. initiated the most important star catalog of this time, the Astronomische Gesellschaft Katalog (AGK).

The assembly in Danzig (now Gdańsk) in August 1939 was the last until a meeting at Göttingen in 1947, when it was re-commenced as Astronomische Gesellschaft in der Britischen Zone. The post-war editorial board consisted of Chairman Albrecht Unsöld (Kiel), Otto Heckmann, J. Larink, B. Straßl, Paul ten Bruggencate, and also Max Beyer representing the amateurs of the society.

== Presidents ==
Below is the list of all presidents of the society as of 2026:

- 1863–1864: Julius Zech
- 1864–1867: Friedrich Wilhelm Argelander
- 1867–1878: Otto Wilhelm von Struve
- 1878–1881: Adalbert Krueger
- 1881–1889: Arthur Auwers
- 1889–1896: Hugo Gyldén
- 1896–1921: Hugo von Seeliger
- 1921–1930: Svante Elis Strömgren
- 1930–1932: Max Wolf
- 1932–1939: Hans Ludendorff
- 1939–1945: August Kopff
- 1945–1947: vacant
- 1947–1949: Albrecht Unsöld
- 1949–1952: Friedrich Becker
- 1952–1957: Otto Heckmann
- 1957–1960: Paul ten Bruggencate
- 1960–1966: Hans Haffner
- 1966–1969: Rudolf Kippenhahn
- 1969–1972: Walter Fricke
- 1972–1975: Hans-Heinrich Voigt
- 1975–1978: Wolfgang Priester
- 1978–1981: Theodor Schmidt-Kaler
- 1981–1984: Gustav Andreas Tammann
- 1984–1987: Michael Grewing
- 1987–1990: Egon Horst Schröter
- 1990–1993: Wolfgang Hillebrandt
- 1993–1996: Hanns Ruder
- 1996–1999: Werner Pfau
- 1999–2002: Erwin Sedlmayr
- 2002–2005: Joachim Krautter
- 2005–2008: Gerhard Hensler
- 2008–2011: Ralf-Jürgen Dettmar
- 2011–2014: Andreas Burkert
- 2014–2017: Matthias Steinmetz
- 2017–2020: Joachim Wambsganß
- 2020-2023: Michael Kramer
- 2023–present: Stefanie Walch-Gassner

== Honorary members ==
With dates of appointment:

- Albrecht Unsöld (1989)
- Wilhelm Becker (1992)
- Erich Kirste (1992)
- Martin Schwarzschild (1993)
- Reimar Lüst (1998)
- Hans-Heinrich Voigt (2007)
- Klaus Tschira (2011)
- Rudolf Kippenhahn (2016)

== Awards ==
The astronomical society awards the following awards and prizes:

- Karl Schwarzschild Medal
- Ludwig Biermann Förderpreis (de:Ludwig-Biermann-Förderpreis)
- Bruno H. Bürgel Award
- Hans Ludwig Neumann Award (de:Hans-Ludwig-Neumann-Preis)

The Hanno and Ruth Roelin Prize is also awarded at the society's annual meeting, but it is administered by the Max Planck Institute for Astronomy.

== See also ==
- Astronomical Calculation Institute (University of Heidelberg)
- Vereinigte Astronomische Gesellschaft
- List of astronomical societies
