= Charlene Heisler =

Canadian astronomer (1961–1999)

- Born: 1 December 1961; Calgary, Alberta, Canada
- Died: 28 October 1999 (aged 37)
- Education: University of Calgary, Yale University
- Scientific career
- Thesis: Galaxies with Spectral Energy Distributions Peaking at 60 Microns: Morphology and Activity Explained by Interactions.

Charlene Heisler (1 December 1961 – 28 October 1999) was a Canadian astronomer. She is best known for her work on Active Galactic Nuclei (AGN). The Astronomical Society of Australia created the Charlene Heisler Prize in her honour.

== Early life and education ==
Charlene Heisler was born in Calgary, Alberta. Heisler graduated from the University of Calgary with a BSc in applied maths and physics in 1985. During her time at Calgary, she worked as a summer research assistant for Sun Kwok and Gene (Eugene) Couch as well as working at the Calgary Centennial Planetarium. Before starting her PhD, Heisler was diagnosed with cystic fibrosis and was informed by her doctor she would not live more than two years and that she should abandon her PhD studies. However, she went on to live 8 more years and she completed her PhD at Yale under the supervision of Jeanette Patricia Vader in 1991. The focus of her thesis was on the properties of galaxies with spectral energy distributions that peaked at sixty microns, referred to as "Sixty Micron Peakers".

== Research and career ==
Heisler spent two years as a post doctoral researcher at York University with Mike De Robertis, where she also began her work in science education. She extended her research of "Peakers" to infrared wavelengths, making use of the Mauna Kea telescopes, with the belief that "Peakers" contained key information about the early stages of AGN. Using a combination of infrared imaging and spectroscopic data from observations she made at Kitt Peak Observatory and the Anglo-Australian Observatory (AAO), this belief proved true. Heisler also taught two undergraduate classes at York, gave public talks and inspired young women in science. In 1993, she moved to Sydney, becoming a postdoctoral research fellow at the Anglo Australian Observatory. She also started work as a support astronomer for IRIS and became a liaison officer with AAO on the MPI 3D project. In 1996, she moved to Mount Stromlo Observatory in Canberra, Australia and was awarded a senior fellowship there in 1998. In 1997, whilst working with Stuart Lumsden and Jeremy Bailey, she published her most notable paper on why only some Seyfert II galaxies have hidden broad line regions that are only visible in polarised light. Heisler and her team thought this was due to a link between the infrared colour of the galaxy and the broad line region existing. This led to a model where Seyfert II galaxies which were known to have hidden broad line regions galaxies being modelled as normal Seyfert galaxies with symmetry axes along the line-of-sight. Her last major project was COLA (COmpact Low-power AGN) with Phil Appleton and Ray Norris which aimed to establish if there was evidence that AGN activity was associated with starburst activity.

After her death, the Astronomical Society of Australia created the Charlene Heisler Prize which is awarded annually to the most outstanding PhD thesis in the field of astronomy at an Australian university.

== Notable publications ==
- Charlene A Heisler; Stuart L Lumsden; Jeremy A Bailey. (February 1997). "Visibility of scattered broad-line emission in Seyfert 2 galaxies". Nature. 385(6618): 700–702. doi: 10.1038/385700a0
- Charlene A Heisler, Patricia J Vader. (January 1994). "Galaxies with Spectral Energy Distributions Peaking Near 60microns II. Optical Broadband Properties". Astronomical Journal. 107: 35. doi: 10.1086/116834
- Charlene A Heisler, Patricia J Vader. (July 1995). "Galaxies with Spectral Energy Distributions Peaking Near 60 micron.III. H(alpha) Imaging". Astronomical Journal. 110: 87. doi: 10.1086/117499
- Charlene A Heisler, Michael M De Robertis. (November 1999). "A Near-Infrared Spectroscopic Study of 60 Micron Peakers". Astronomical Journal. 118(5): 2038–2054. doi: 10.1086/301073
- Charlene A Heisler, Michael M De Robertis, D Nadeau. (May 1996). "Near-infrared surface photometry of `Sixty Micron Peaker' galaxies". Monthly Notices of the Royal Astronomical Society. 280(2): 579–615. doi: 10.1093/mnras/280.2.579
