= Bruno H. Bürgel =

German astronomer, writer and science journalist

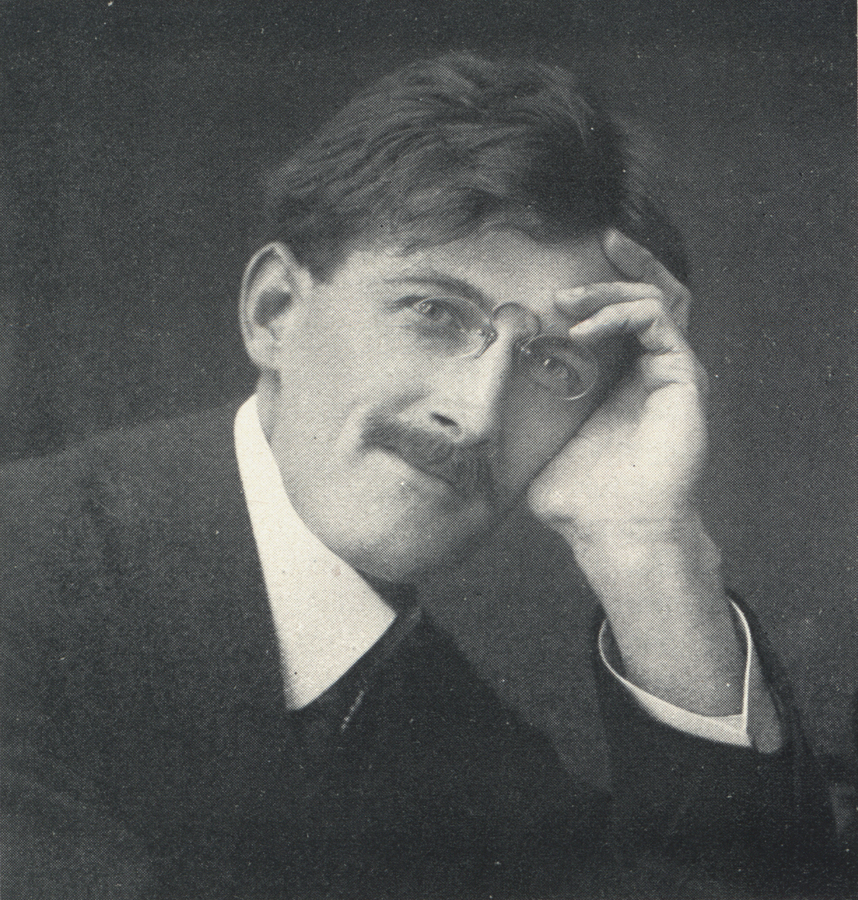

Bruno Hans Bürgel (14 November 1875 – 8 July 1948) was a German astronomer, writer and science journalist.

== Biography ==
Bürgel was born into a working-class family. Since his biological father, the archaeologist Adolf Trendelenburg, refused to acknowledge his son, the child was adopted by the shoemaker Gustav Bürgel and his wife. In 1889, Bürgel began an apprenticeship as a shoemaker in his adoptive father's workshop. He then became a lithographer and later a factory worker until 1895. Despite financial difficulties, Bürgel acquired extensive scientific knowledge, particularly in astronomy. He managed to secure a position as an observer at the Urania Observatory.

Bürgel worked as a journalist for the social democratic newspaper Vorwärts. Bürgel then became a freelance writer. In 1903 and 1904, on Wilhelm Foerster's recommendation, Bürgel was able to attend lectures at the University of Berlin. At the same time, he worked for various publishing houses. His first book, Aus fernen Welten, was published in 1910 and was a huge success.

Bürgel spent the First World War as a messenger on the Western Front. His second important book, From Vom Arbeiter zum Astronomen was published in 1919. After the war, he returned to writing and published several works about his thoughts and experiences during the war, which became quite popular. Like other scientists of the time, he spoke at events organized by the then popular workers' educational associations, where he felt at home as a socialist.

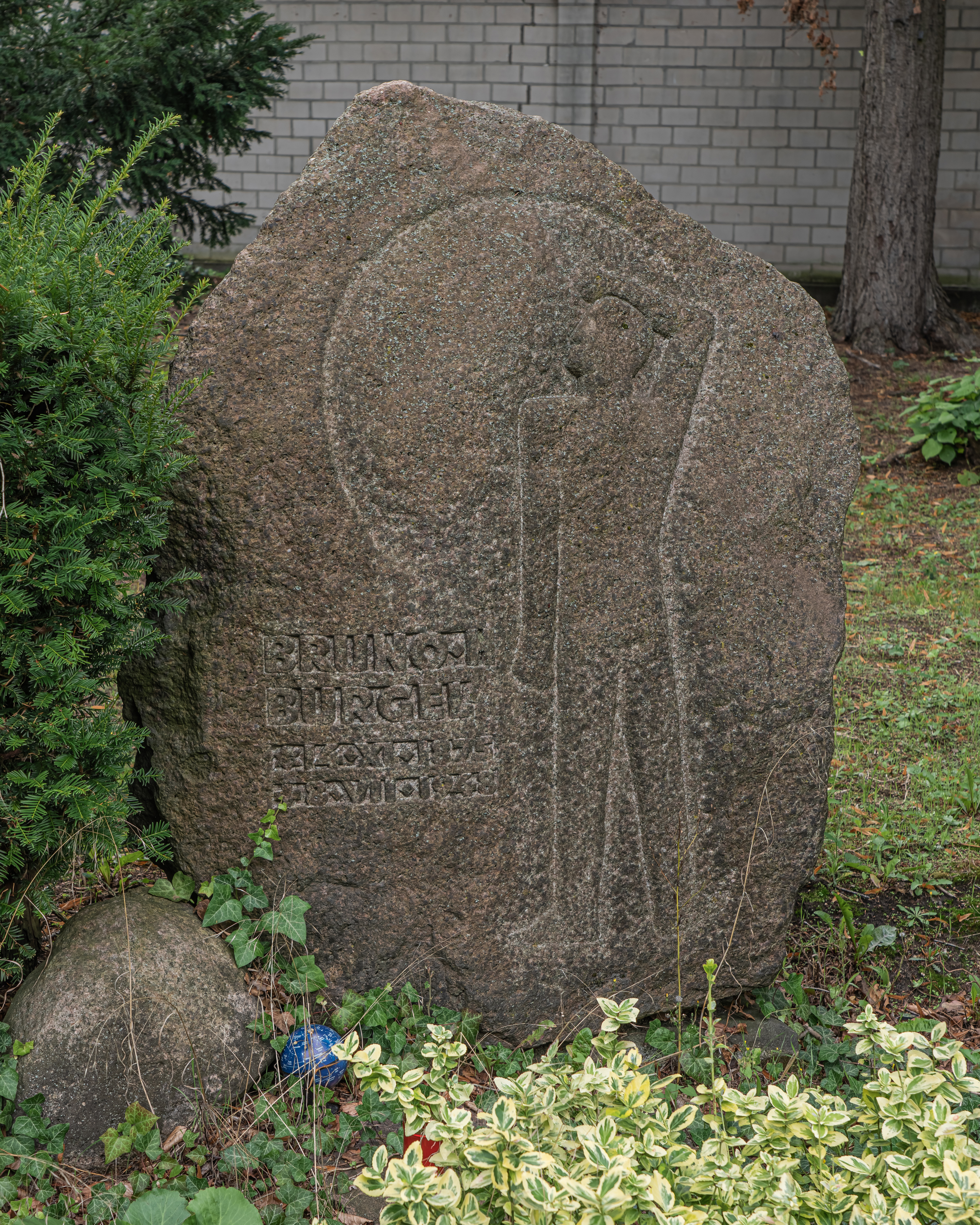
Grave of Bruno Bürgel at the Goethestraße cemetery in Potsdam

After the Nazi seizure of power, many of his works were censored and he distanced himself from public life. After the Second World War, Bürgel lived in the Soviet occupation zone. The immediate protection of his person and property ordered by the Soviet military administration gave him hope for a better future. Bürgel continued his work as a journalist and became a co-founder of the Cultural Association of East Germany. He declined an offer of a professorship at the Humboldt University of Berlin but remained an active journalist until his death in 1948.

== Legacy ==
The Bruno H. Bürgel Memorial has been part of the URANIA Planetarium Potsdam since 1970. It was established in 1955 in Potsdam-Babelsberg, and in 1970 was moved to the Bruno H. Bürgel Astronomical Center in the Neuer Garten, which has been called the URANIA Planetarium with Bruno H. Bürgel Memorial since it was taken over by the URANIA Association "Wilhelm Foerster" Potsdam e. V. in 2001.

In 1999, the asteroid (10100) Bürgel was named after him. The public observatories Bruno-H.-Bürgel-Sternwarte in Berlin, the observatory “Bruno-H.-Bürgel” in Sohland/Spree and the observatory in Hartha were named after him. Various schools such as those in Berlin- Lichtenrade, Eberswalde, Potsdam, Rathenow and Schöneiche near Berlin were named after Bürgel. Various streets in several cities such as Berlin-Niederschöneweide, Bremen, Frankfurt (Oder), Leipzig, Potsdam, Stralsund, Strausberg and Teltow were named after him. The Bruno H. Bürgel Prize is awarded by the Astronomical Society. It is given for outstanding popular presentations of recent astronomical results. A Berlin memorial plaque was placed on Bürgel's former home in Berlin-Zehlendorf. The observatory on the roof of the Georgius-Agricola-Gymnasium in Chemnitz is named "Bruno H. Bürgel Observatory" in his honor.
