= Zah (name) =

Zah is a surname and a masculine given name. Notable people with the name are as follows:

== Surname ==
- Felician Záh (died 1330), Hungarian nobleman and soldier
- Peterson Zah (1937–2023), American politician

== Given name ==
- Zah Frazier (born 2000), American football player
- Zah Rahan Krangar (born 1985), Liberian professional footballer
