= Falk Herwig =

Canadian astrophysicist

Falk Herwig (born 1969) is a Canadian astrophysicist who is known for his researches at the University of Victoria. He has over 200 peer-reviewed articles which brought him an h-index of 37.

== Research ==
In 1998, he and another astrophysicist, Thomas Driebe, described the evolution of helium white dwarfs and two years later published their findings on evolution of convective overshooting of asymptotic giant branch stars. In 1999, he and his colleagues described what happens after the star explodes. He used the PG 1159 star as an example and proved the existence of convective overshooting.
