= Heidelberg University Faculty of Physics and Astronomy =

The Faculty of Physics and Astronomy is one of twelve faculties at the University of Heidelberg. It comprises the Kirchhoff Institute of Physics, the Institute of Physics, Theoretical Physics, Environmental Physics and Theoretical Astrophysics.

== Kirchhoff Institute of Physics ==
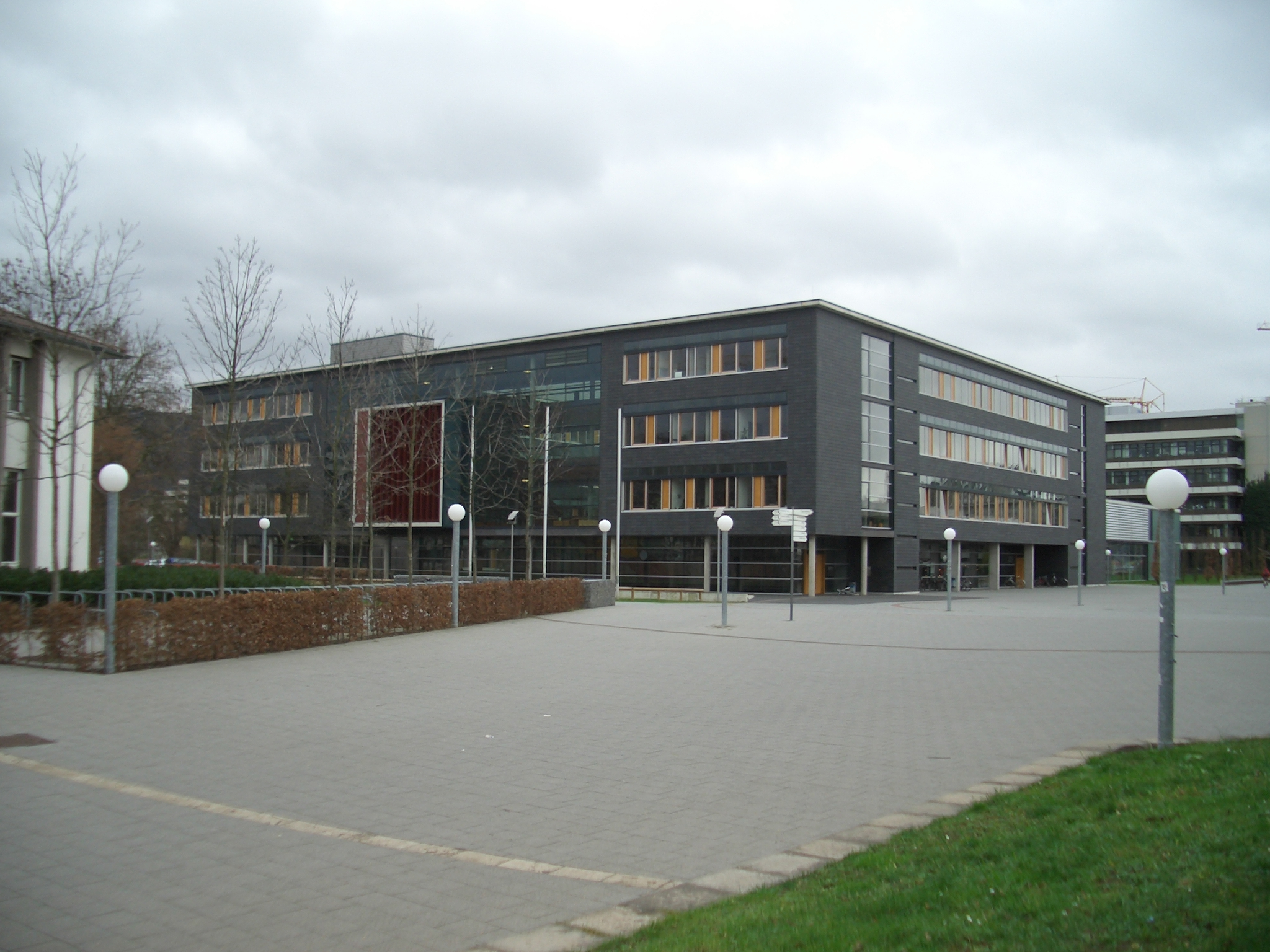
The Kirchhoff Institute for Physics

The Kirchhoff-Institut für Physik (Kirchhoff Institute of Physics, KIP), built in 2002, is a research institute located in Heidelberg, Germany. It shares faculty with the physics and astronomy departments at the University of Heidelberg. The institute is named after Gustav Kirchhoff, who collaborated in Heidelberg in 1854 with Robert Bunsen in spectroscopic work.

The scope of its research is broad. Many projects exist, from low temperature physics and neuronal information processing to surface physics.

Facilities include (apart from several laboratories) a cleanroom, an ASIC laboratory, an experimental hall and, as it is also serves undergraduates, there are 2 auditoriums with a capacity of over 300 people, several seminar rooms and a CIP pool. Current director is Prof. Dr. Hans-Christian Schultz-Coulon.

Research interests include:

- Biophysics
- Complex Quantum Systems condensed matter systems at ultra-low temperatures and matter waves.
- Particle Physics calorimetry and trigger processor development for the ATLAS and H1 particle detectors.
- Technical Computer Science

== Institute of Environmental Physics ==
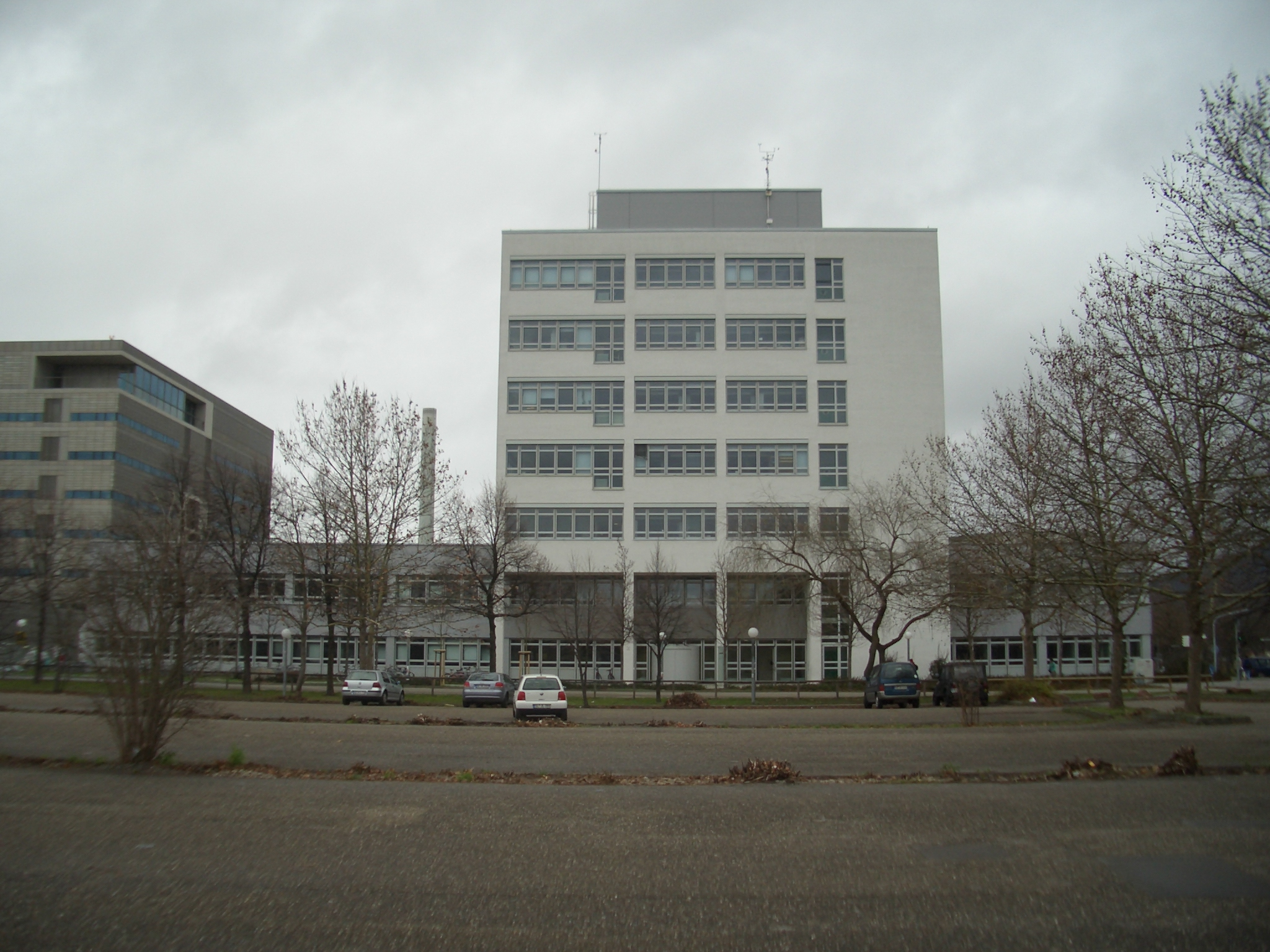
The Institute of Environmental Physics

The Institute of Environmental Physics was founded in 1975. Its current director is Prof. Dr. Norbert Frank.

Research Interests

- Atmosphere and Remote Sensing, Radiative Transfer, Greenhouse Gases, Modelling, and Solar Energy Deposition
- Aquatic Systems, Groundwater and Paleoclimate, and Limnology
- Small-Scale Air-Sea Interaction, Image Processing
- Climate, Aerosols, Numerical Modelling, and Climate
- Physics of Environmental Archives, Isotope Geochemistry, Paleoclimate, Past Ocean Dynamics

== Center for Astronomy ==
The Zentrum für Astronomie der Universität Heidelberg (Center for Astronomy of Heidelberg University) was founded in 2005 and is an association of three research institutes: the Astronomical Computation Institute, the Institute of Theoretical Astrophysics and the Landessternwarte Heidelberg-Königstuhl (the Heidelberg-Königstuhl State Observatory).

=== Astronomical Computation Institute ===
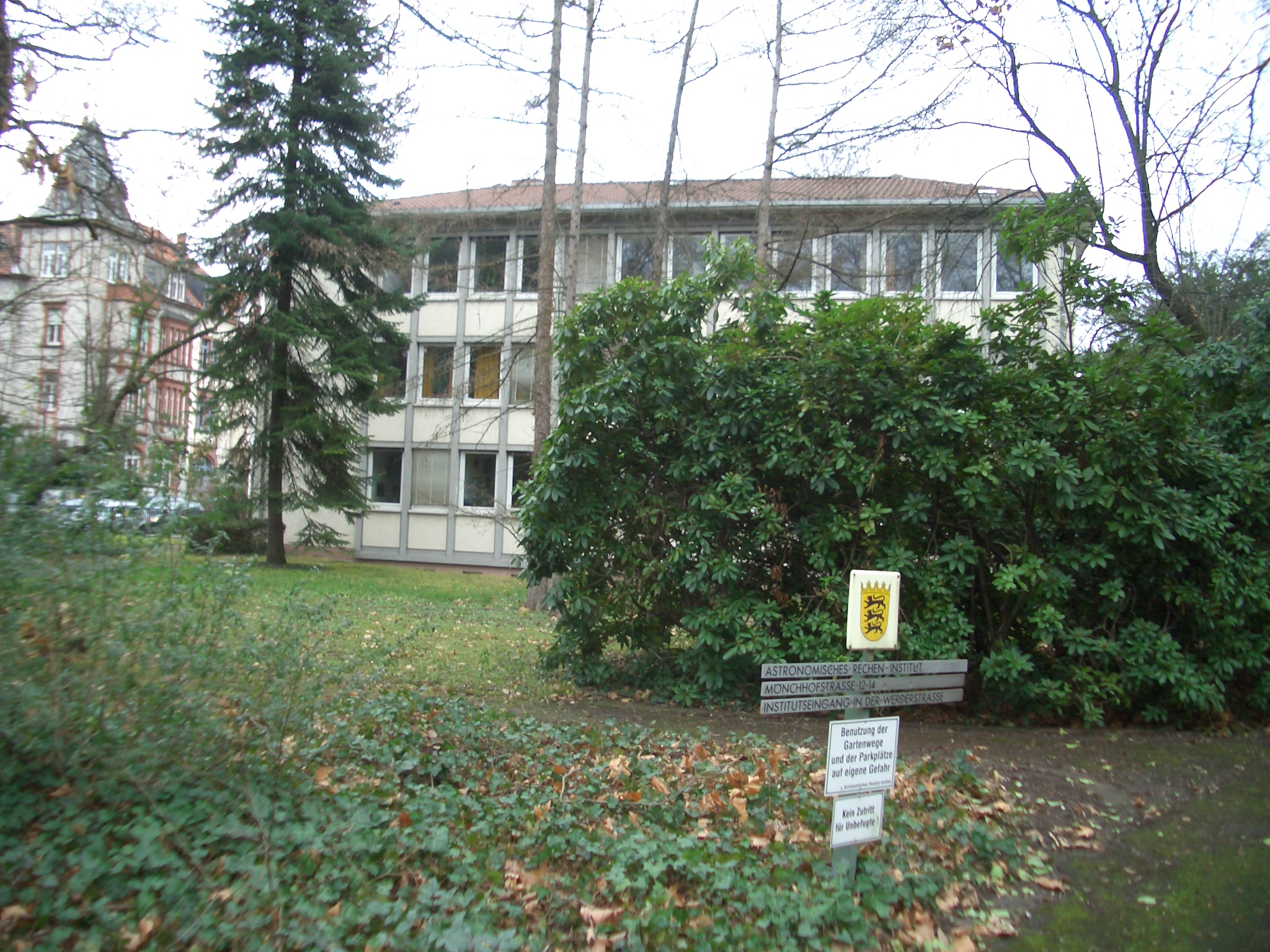
The Astronomisches Rechen-Institut

The Astromomisches Rechen-Institut (Astronomical Computation Institute) is part of the Center of Astronomy of the University of Heidelberg. Before it was a research institute for astrometry and stellar dynamics belonging to the state of Baden-Württemberg.

It is the most important international institution for astronomical data calculations. The Astronomisches Rechen-Institut is responsible among other things for the Gliese catalog of nearby stars, the fundamental catalog FK5 and FK6 and the annual published Apparent places, a high precision catalog with pre-calculated positions for over 3 thousand stars for each day.

The ARI was founded in 1700 in Berlin-Dahlem by Gottfried Kirch. It has its origin from the catalog patent application in this time by Frederick I of Prussia, who introduced a monopoly on publishing star catalogs in Prussia. In 1945 the Institute was moved by the occupying force (Americans) nearer to their headquarters in Heidelberg. Since January 1, 2005 it has been integrated into the Center of Astronomy and as of today is not limited to publishing star catalogs but has a wide research scope.

=== Institute of Theoretical Astrophysics ===
The Institute of Theoretical Astrophysics was founded in 1976.

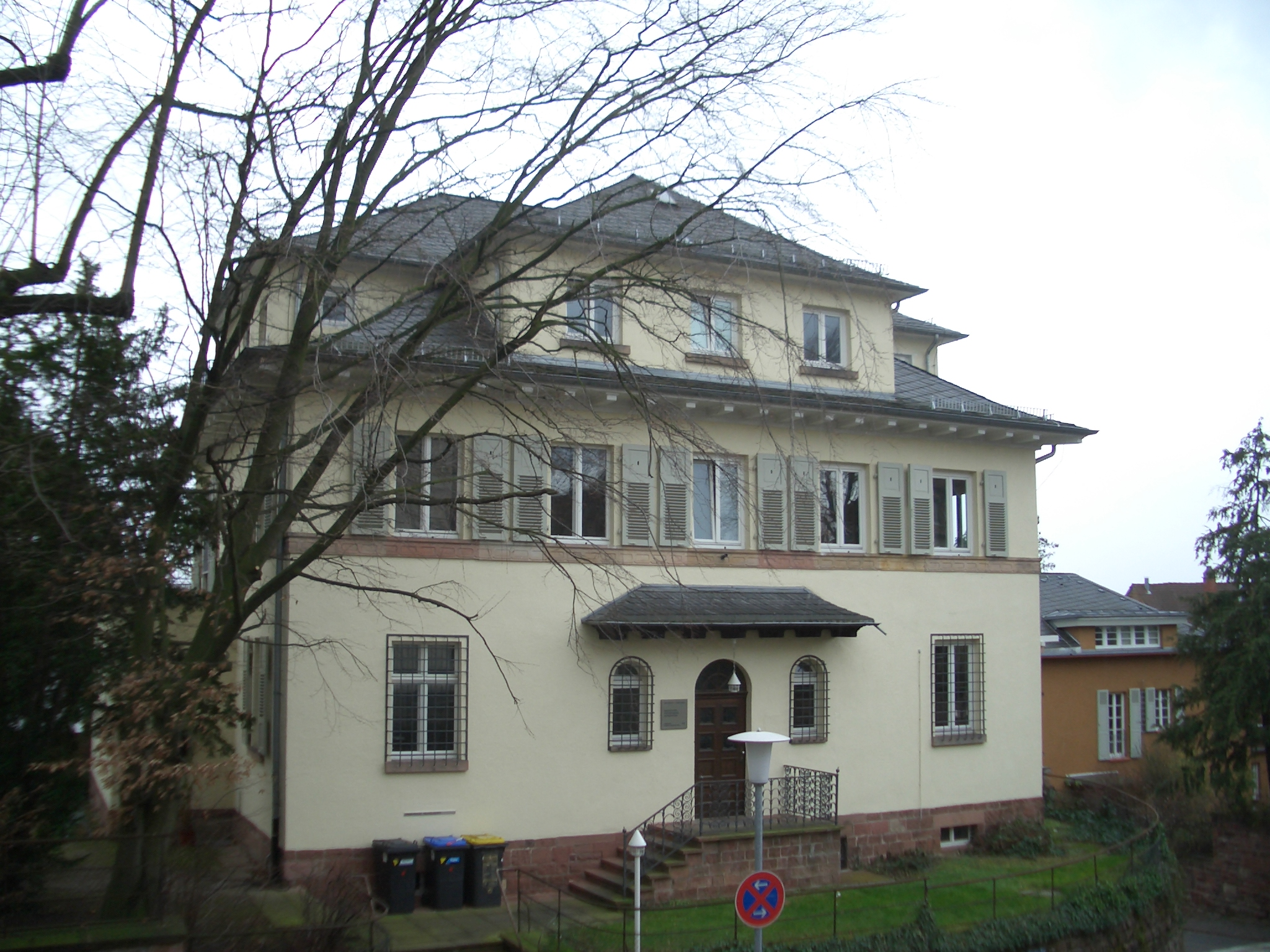
The Institute of Theoretical Astrophysics

Research Interest

- Cosmology, Gravitational lensing and Galaxy groups and clusters
- Star formation, interstellar turbulences and development of galactic gas clouds
- Planet formation, through gravitation collapse of interstellar molecular gas clouds
- Accretion discs, theory of accretion discs, winds and mass loss from discs
