= Rudolf Kippenhahn =

German astrophysicist (1926–2020)

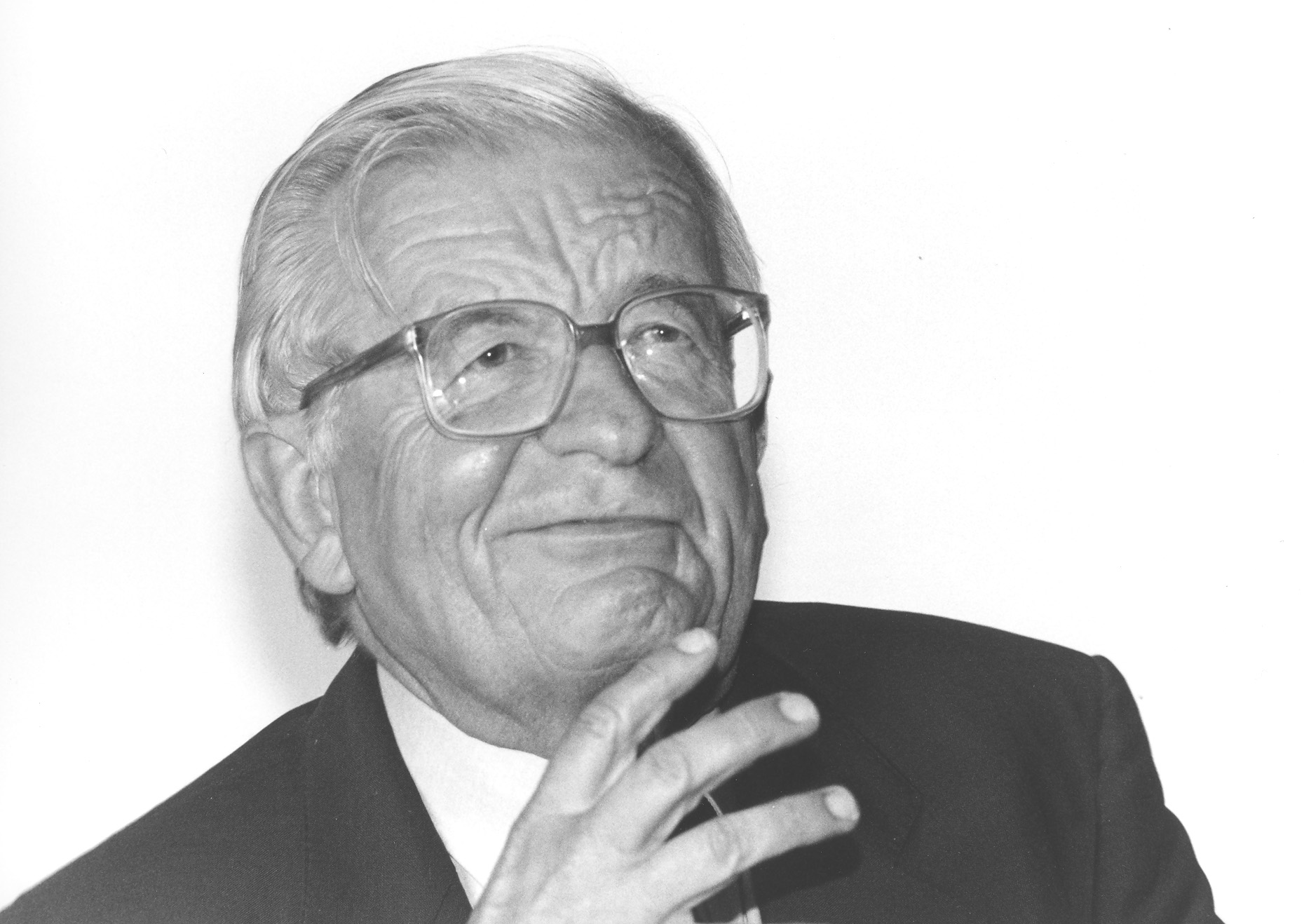
Image of Rudolf Kippenhahn

Rudolf Kippenhahn (24 May 1926 – 15 November 2020) was a German astrophysicist and science author.

== Biography ==
Rudolf Kippenhahn was born in Pernink, Czechoslovakia. He originally studied mathematics and physics at the University of Erlangen-Nuremberg before changing to Astronomy. From 1975 to 1991, Kippenhahn was director of the Max Planck Institute For Astrophysics in Garching, Munich, Germany. After 1991, Kippenhahn was an active published author in Göttingen, trying to popularise astronomical science research, in the same vein as Stephen Hawking's writing, for which he won the Bruno H. Bürgel prize. His books covered such diverse topics as astronomy, cryptology and atomic physics. In 2005, Kippenhahn was honoured by the Royal Astronomical Society with the Eddington medal for his scientific research into the computation of the structure of star and of stellar evolution. A diagram displaying how the interior of a star evolves from the zero age main sequence to the later stages of its evolution are known as "Kippenhahn diagrams." Normally these diagrams display information such as convective borders, sites of nuclear energy generation and sites of shell burning.

== Selected publications ==
- Kippenhahn, R.; Weigert, A.; Weiss, A. (2012). Stellar Structure and Evolution. Springer, Berlin. Bibcode:2013sse..book.....K. doi:10.1007/978-3-642-30304-3. ISBN 978-3-642-30255-8. Archived from the original on 2021-08-27.
- Kippenhahn, R.; Moellenhoff, C. (1975). Elementary Plasma Physics. Bibliographic Institute, Mannheim. Bibcode:1975elpl.book.....K.
- Kippenhahn, Rudolf (1987). Light from the Depth of Time. Springer.

== Awards ==
- 1992 Bruno H. Bürgel Prize.
- 2005 Eddington Medal
- 2007 Karl Schwarzschild Medal
