= Martin Asplund =

Swedish-Australian astrophysicist

Martin Asplund FAA
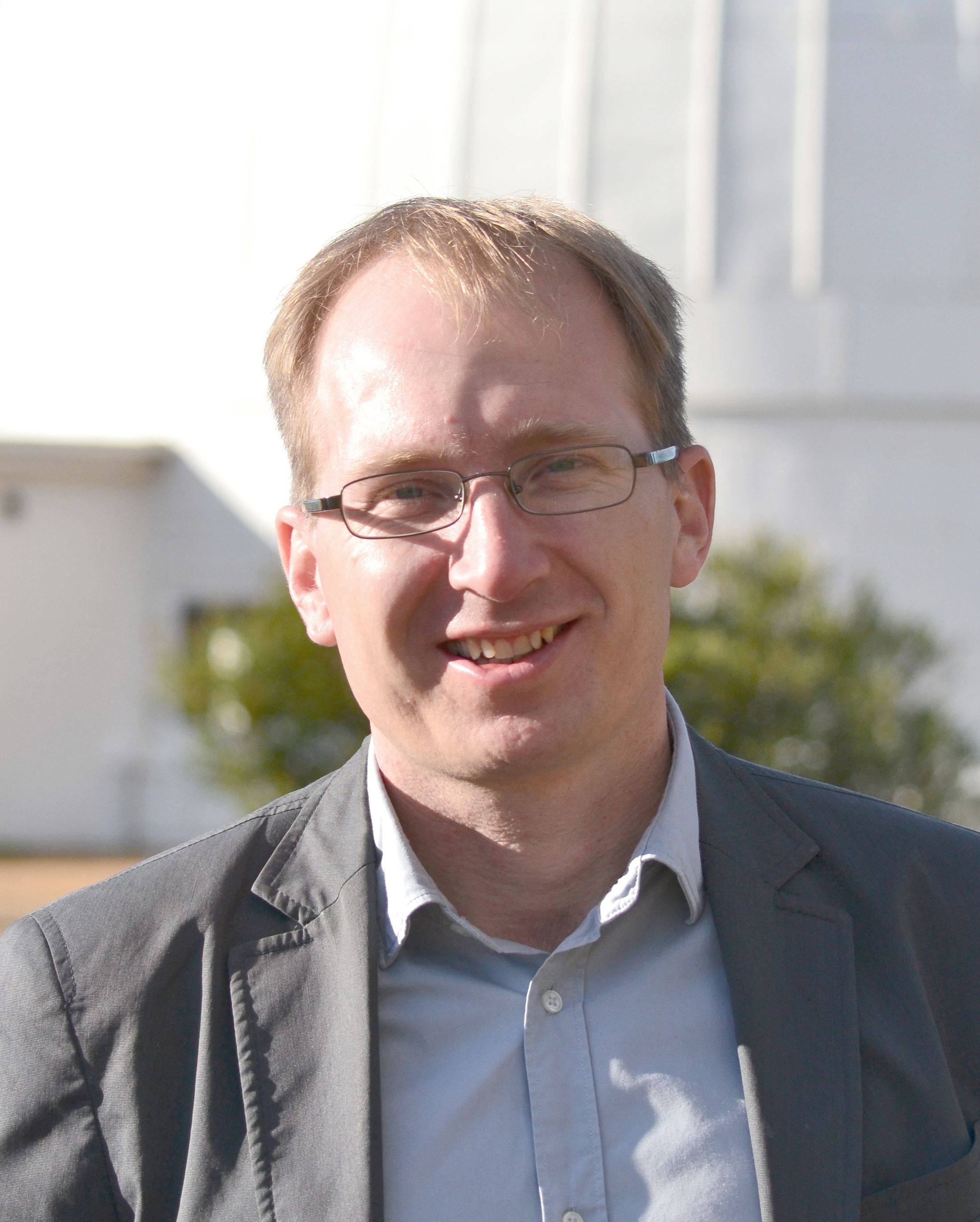
- Born: April 29, 1970 (age 56); Stockholm, Sweden
- Education: Uppsala University
- Occupation: Astrophysicist

Professor Martin Asplund (FAA) (born April 29, 1970) is a Swedish-Australian astrophysicist and a Fellow of the Australian Academy of Science. He has made credible and sometimes controversial contributions in the field of astronomy. His models of the levels of the heavy elements, oxygen, carbon, neon and nitrogen in the solar spectrum have challenged scientific understanding of the sun and the rest of the cosmos.

== Career ==
Asplund completed his PhD at Uppsala University in 1997 and became an assistant professor at the same university in 2001. He worked at the Research School of Astronomy and Astrophysics, the Australian National University from 2002 to 2007, where he was promoted to full professor. In 2007, he was appointed as Director of the Max Planck Institute for Astrophysics and at the time was one of the youngest directors within the Max Planck Society. From 2011 to 2020, he was employed at the Australian National University as a Laureate Fellowship recipient, the highest funding award from the Australian Research Council.
