= Paul ten Bruggencate =

German astronomer and astrophysicist

- Born: 24 February 1901; Arosa, Switzerland
- Died: 14 September 1961 (aged 60)
- Education: Ludwig-Maximilians-Universität München
- Scientific career
- Workplaces: Göttingen University Observatory 1941–1961
- Doctoral advisor: Hugo von Seeliger

Paul ten Bruggencate (24 February 1901 – 14 September 1961) was a German astronomer and astrophysicist.

== Youth and education ==
Ten Bruggencate was born in Arosa, Switzerland, and went to several schools in Switzerland, in the Netherlands and in Germany. He further studied at the Ludwig-Maximilians-Universität München and started his PhD work with Hugo von Seeliger. However, due to health problems, Seeliger had to hand over the supervision of his PhD students to Hans Kienle.

Ten Bruggencate graduated from the Ludwig-Maximilians-Universität München and in 1924, together with Hans Kienle, moved to the Göttingen University Observatory. Ten Bruggencate stayed as an assistant at the Göttingen University until 1926, when he traveled to Java. He worked there with the Dutch astronomer Joan Voûte at the Bosscha Observatory near Lembang and started a survey of Cepheid variable stars. After two years at the Bosscha Observatory, he visited the Mt. Wilson Observatory and the Harvard College Observatory In the United States. In 1929, he moved to the University of Greifswald in northern Germany, where he finished his habilitation on Cepheid variable stars in 1935. Most of this work was based on the observations carried out in Lembang.

== Academic career ==
Ten Bruggencate became chief astronomer at the Potsdam Observatory in 1935. The most valuable equipment at that time at Potsdam was the solar telescope in the Einstein Tower. From that time on, the main focus of ten Bruggencate's research became the Sun. In 1941, during World War II, ten Bruggencate became the director at the Göttingen University Observatory. In pursuing his interest in observing the Sun, he looked for a new solar telescope. The already existing observatory at the Hainberg, southeast of Göttingen, provided the best location within the surrounding area. The interest of the military in the effect of the Sun on short wave radio communication made it possible to build this observatory during the war. Military patronage and ten Bruggencate's profound knowledge of the solar telescope in Potsdam assisted construction of the new telescope.

A personal antipathy between ten Bruggencate and Karl-Otto Kiepenheuer, who also worked for some time at the Göttingen University Observatory, led to a division of the German solar observations. While Kiepenheuer founded the Fraunhofer Institute(not to be mixed with today's Fraunhofer Society) and coordinated several solar observatories across Europe, ten Bruggencate built his own observatory. Both groups were serviced and supported by the military to help forecast short-wave communication conditions.

After the war, the observations were continued. Ten Bruggencate established a second solar observatory in Switzerland where the weather conditions were more favorable compared to the often cloudy skies over Germany. The Locarno Observatory was planned and built in the late 1950s. Ten Bruggencate was the president of the Academy of Sciences Göttingen from 1958 until 1961. He also remained as director of the Göttingen University Observatory until his death in 1961. The Locarno Observatory became fully operational shortly after his death.

The Locarno Observatory was closed in 1984 and the equipment transferred to the Teide Observatory on Tenerife, Spain. Teide Observatory also hosts telescopes of the Kiepenheuer Institute for Solar Physics.

The crater Ten Bruggencate on the Moon is named after him.
