= Center of Astronomy (Heidelberg University) =

German research institute association

Coordinates: 49.413°N 8.69°E

ZAH Logo

The Zentrum für Astronomie der Universität Heidelberg (Center for Astronomy of Heidelberg University) in Heidelberg, Germany, founded in 2005, is an association of three, formerly state-run research institutes: the Astronomisches Rechen-Institut, the Institut für Theoretische Astrophysik (Institute for Theoretical Astrophysics) and the Landessternwarte Heidelberg-Königstuhl (Heidelberg-Königstuhl State Observatory).
