= Gordon Myers Amateur Achievement Award =

- Awarded for: Significant contributions to astronomy or amateur astronomy
- Presented by: Astronomical Society of the Pacific
- First award: 1979
- Website: astrosociety.org

The Gordon Myers Amateur Achievement Award, known until 2018 as the Amateur Achievement Award of the Astronomical Society of the Pacific, is one of nine annual astronomical awards managed by the Astronomical Society of the Pacific. It recognizes "significant contributions to astronomy or amateur astronomy by those not employed in the field of astronomy in a professional capacity." The contributions can be done in the fields of both observational astronomy or astronomical technologies. The award has been given to amateur astronomers from various countries since 1979 and has become one of the most geographically diverse astronomical awards.

Award winners receive a commemorative plaque, which is presented at the Annual Meeting Awards Banquet. The monetary value of the award is US$500. Candidates can be nominated by any member of the astronomical community (with the exception of the nominees themselves and their families) and the nominations should be accompanied by other letters of support. All the nominations have to be delivered to the Astronomical Society of the Pacific by December 15 of the nominating year and remain valid for three years. The winners are selected by the Awards Committee appointed by the Board of Directors. The committee have the right not to award any of the nominees if they do not consider their achievements exceptional enough, which has already happened several times.

== Winners ==
Recipients of the award have been:

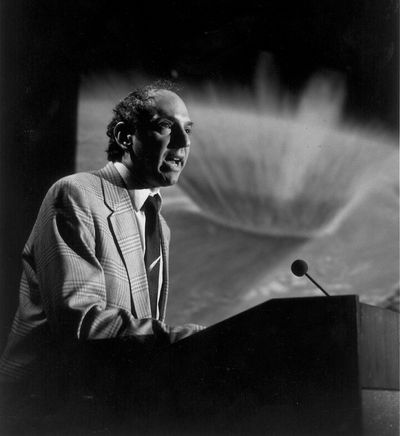
David Levy, the 1993 awardee

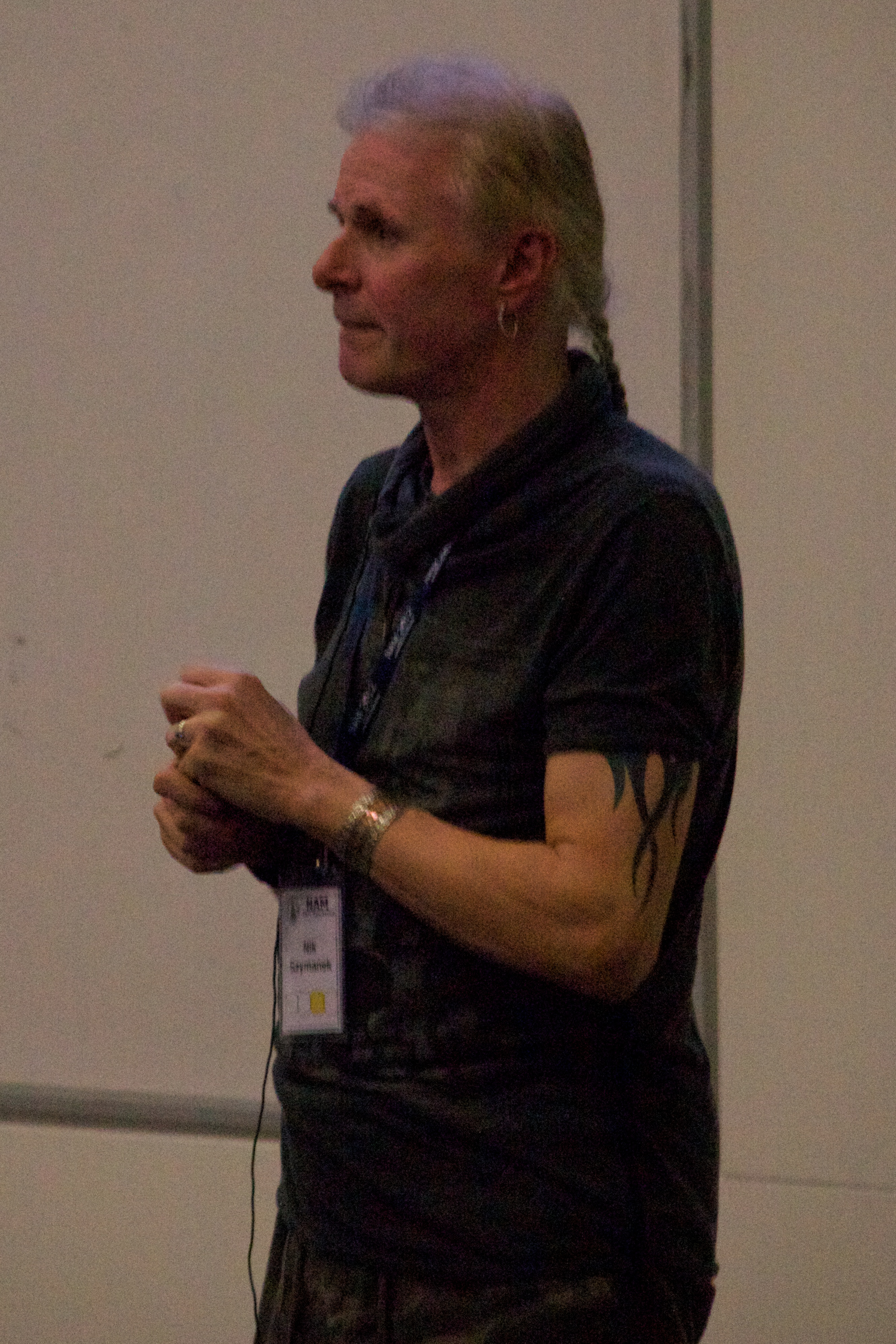
Nik Szymanek, the 2004 awardee

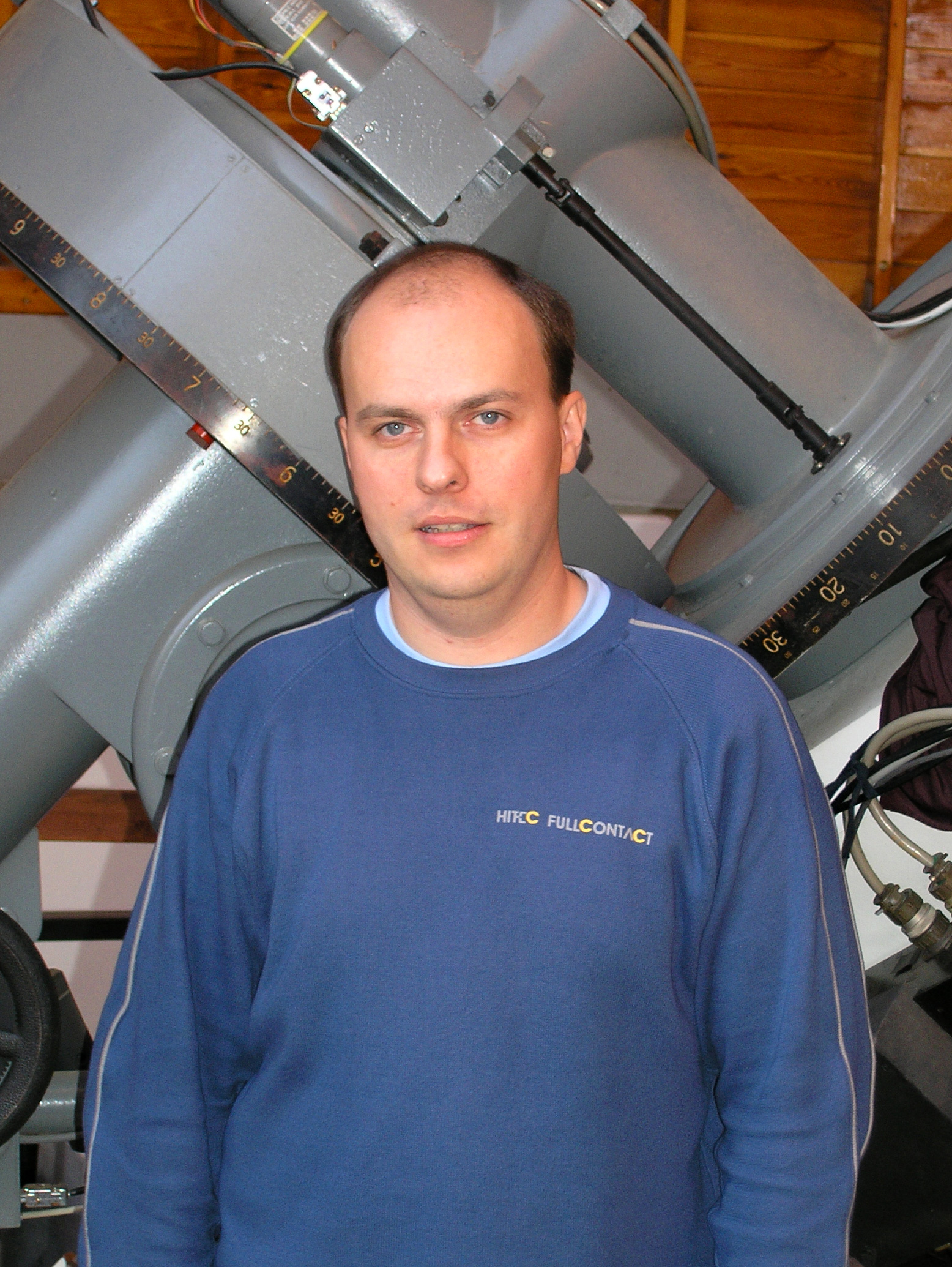
Kamil Hornoch, the 2006 awardee

Year	Name	Nationality	Field	Notes
1979	James McMahon	(United States)	Occultations	
1980	Frank Bateson	(New Zealand)	Variable stars	
1981	George Alcock	(United Kingdom)	Novae/Comets	
1982	Ben Mayer	(United States)	Problicom	
1983	J. U. Gunter	(United States)	Asteroids	
1984	Russell Genet	(United States)	Photoelectric photometry	
1985	Gregg Thompson & Robert Evans	(Australia)	Supernovae	
1986	Jean Meeus	(Belgium)	Computational astronomy	
1987	Clinton B. Ford	(United States)	Variable stars	
1988	Jack B. Newton	(Canada)	Astrophotography	
1989	Paul Baize	(France)	Double stars	
1990	Oscar Monnig	(United States)	Meteorites	
1991	Otto Kippes	(Germany)	Asteroid orbits	
1992	Richard Lines & Helen Lines	(United States)	Photoelectric photometry of variable stars	
1993	David H. Levy	(Canada) / (United States)	Comets	
1994	Walter H. Haas	(United States)	ALPO founder	
1995	Donald Parker	(United States)	Planetary imaging	
1996	M. Daniel Overbeek	(South Africa)	Variable stars	
1997	Edward A. Halbach	(United States)	Variable stars/occultations	
1998	Albert F. A. L. Jones	(New Zealand)	Variable stars/comets	
1999	Warren Offutt	(United States)	Trans-Neptunian objects	
2000	Paul Boltwood	(Canada)	Deep-sky imaging/Comet Hyakutake	
2001	Syuichi Nakano	(Japan)	Computing comet orbits	
2002		No award		
2003	Kyle E. Smalley	(United States)	Near-Earth asteroids	
2004	Nik Szymanek	(United Kingdom)	Imaging and image processing	
2005	Tim Hunter	(United States)	Light pollution	
2006	Kamil Hornoch	(Czech Republic)	Visual and CCD observations of variable stars/comets	
2007	Peter Francis Williams	(Australia)	R Coronae Borealis stars/variable star monitoring	
2008	Steve Mandel	(United States)	CCD imaging	
2009	Thomas Droege	(United States)	Developing CCD instrumentation and a worldwide sky survey program	
2010	Allan Rahill	(Canada)	Adapted Canadian Meteorological Centre forecast products for the purpose of planning observing sessions with highly accurate high resolution point forecasts of cloud cover, transparency, seeing, darkness, wind, temperature and humidity over North and Central America	
2011	Kevin Apps	(United Kingdom)	Advancing the fields of extra-solar planet research and stellar astrophysics	
2012	Jeffrey L. Hopkins	(United States)	Photoelectric photometry and high-resolution spectroscopy	
2013		No award		
2014	Rod Stubbings	(Australia)	Instrumental in helping redefine the Z Cam sub-type of dwarf novae, and discovered the recurrent nova V745 Sco in outburst in the morning sky, triggering an AAVSO Alert Notice and significant attention from the astronomical community	
2015		No award		
2016		No award		
2017	Gao Xing	(China)	Supernovae/Comets	
2018	Thiam-Guan Tan	(Australia)	Exoplanets	
2019		No award		
2020		No award		
2021		No award		
2022	Paul D. Maley	(United States)	Solar eclypses, divulgation, occultations	

== See also ==
Other Astronomical Society of the Pacific awards:

- Catherine Wolfe Bruce Gold Medal
- Klumpke-Roberts Award
- Robert J. Trumpler Award

Other amateur astronomy awards:

- Chambliss Amateur Achievement Award
- List of astronomy awards
