= Paul Boltwood =

Canadian astronomer (1943–2017)

Paul Boltwood (1943 – September 25, 2017) was a Canadian amateur astronomer. He was engaged in developing hardware and software for deep sky imaging and in research of brightness variations in active galactic nuclei. He was also acknowledged for his studies of near-nucleus activity in Comet Hyakutake.

== Early life, personal life and education ==
Paul Boltwood was born in Vancouver, British Columbia in 1943. He first became interested in astronomy around age 12 and had built his own telescope by age 15.

He received a bachelor's degree in mathematics from the University of British Columbia in 1966. He pursued a career in computer software and systems design, with an emphasis on signal and image processing.

Boltwood died on September 25, 2017, aged 73 or 74, in Stittsville, Ontario.

== Astronomy ==
Paul Boltwood founded Boltwood Systems Corporation in 1980, which manufactured cloud sensors for amateur astronomers.

In the early 1990s, he constructed an observatory in his backyard near Ottawa, Ontario, with a CCD camera of his own design. He used the observatory to perform long-term monitoring of several blazars (active galactic nuclei with relativistic jets), including the objects OJ 287 and 3C 66A. His observations were used professional astronomers and he is listed as the co-author of several scientific journal articles.

He made a series of images of the nucleus of the comet Hyakutake, which were released as part of the short film Comet Odyssey.

In 1998, Boltwood won the Sky & Telescope magazine Deep Field Challenge. The contest, proposed by professional astronomer Bradley Schaefer, challenged amateur astronomers to take the deepest image of a designed patch of the sky in the constellation Serpens. Using 20 hours of exposure time on his 16-inch telescope and custom software to add the resulting 767 images together, Boltwood achieved a limiting magnitude of 24.1, a result comparable with those seen in professional observatories. His photo was featured as the Astronomy Picture of the Day on April 14, 1999.

== Awards and recognition ==
In 1995, he was awarded the Chant Medal of the Royal Astronomical Society of Canada. This medal is awarded, not more than once a year, to an amateur astronomer resident in Canada on the basis of the value of the work carried out in astronomy and closely allied fields of the original investigation.

In 2000, he was awarded with the Amateur Achievement Award of the Astronomical Society of the Pacific.

Asteroid 8785 Boltwood was named in his honour.

== Selected publications ==
- Boltwood, Paul (2000). "An Amateur Astronomer's Experiences with Amateur-Professional Relations". Amateur - Professional Partnerships in Astronomy. 220: 188. Bibcode:2000ASPC..220..188B. ISSN 1050-3390.
- Sillanpaa, A.; Takalo, L.O.; Pursimo, T.; Lehto, H.J.; Nilsson, K.; Teerikorpi, P.; Heinaemaeki, P.; Kidger, M.; de Diego, J.A. (1996). "Confirmation of the 12-year optical outburst cycle in blazar OJ 287". Astronomy and Astrophysics. 305: L17. Bibcode:1996A&A...305L..17S. ISSN 0004-6361.
- Wehrle, A. E.; Pian, E.; Urry, C. M.; Maraschi, L.; McHardy, I. M.; Lawson, A. J.; Ghisellini, G.; Hartman, R. C.; Madejski, G. M. (1998-04-10). "Multiwavelength Observations of a Dramatic High‐Energy Flare in the Blazar 3C 279". The Astrophysical Journal. 497 (1): 178–187. arXiv:astro-ph/9711243. Bibcode:1998ApJ...497..178W. doi:10.1086/305461. ISSN 0004-637X. S2CID 53537826.
- Hartman, R. C.; Bottcher, M.; Aldering, G.; Aller, H.; Aller, M.; Backman, D. E.; Balonek, T. J.; Bertsch, D. L.; Bloom, S. D. (2001). "Multiepoch Multiwavelength Spectra and Models for Blazar 3C 279". The Astrophysical Journal. 553 (2): 683–694. arXiv:astro-ph/0102127. Bibcode:2001ApJ...553..683H. doi:10.1086/320970. ISSN 0004-637X. S2CID 5473528.
- Krawczynski, H.; Hughes, S. B.; Horan, D.; Aharonian, F.; Aller, M. F.; Aller, H.; Boltwood, P.; Buckley, J.; Coppi, P. (2004-01-20). "Multiwavelength Observations of Strong Flares from the TeV Blazar 1ES 1959+650". The Astrophysical Journal. 601 (1): 151–164. arXiv:astro-ph/0310158. Bibcode:2004ApJ...601..151K. doi:10.1086/380393. ISSN 0004-637X. S2CID 18924157.
- Błażejowski, M.; Blaylock, G.; Bond, I. H.; Bradbury, S. M.; Buckley, J. H.; Carter‐Lewis, D. A.; Celik, O.; Cogan, P.; Cui, W. (2005). "A Multiwavelength View of the TeV Blazar Markarian 421: Correlated Variability, Flaring, and Spectral Evolution". The Astrophysical Journal. 630 (1): 130–141. arXiv:astro-ph/0505325. Bibcode:2005ApJ...630..130B. doi:10.1086/431925. ISSN 0004-637X. S2CID 27860117.

Preceded by Warren Offutt	Amateur Achievement Award of Astronomical Society of the Pacific; 2000	Succeeded by Syuichi Nakano
