= Robert D. Stephens =

American astronomer

Robert D. Stephens (born 1955) is an American amateur astronomer and a prolific photometrist of minor planets at the Center for Solar System Studies (U81), Rancho Cucamonga in California, United States.

== Career ==
By profession, Stephens is a Certified Public Accountant in California since 1978, and has co-founded the accounting firm Fox & Stephens Inc. in 1988.

Member of the American Astronomical Society and former president of the Riverside Astronomical Society, Stephens became active in studying minor planets in 1999. Since then, he has obtained and published hundreds of rotational ±light curves of asteroids from photometric observations taken at the CS3–Trojan Station of the Center for Solar System Studies (U81), Landers, in the Southern California desert, where he collaborates with astronomers Daniel Coley (U80) and Brian D. Warner (U82). He is president of the astronomical research institution MoreData! Inc., as well as treasurer of the Society for Astronomical Sciences and the American Association of Variable Star Observers.

== Awards and honors ==
- Stephens was the winner of the 2009-Chambliss Amateur Achievement Award and the 2012-Clifford W. Holmes Award.
- In 2013, he was awarded a Shoemaker NEO Grant, together with astronomers Albino Carbognani, Robert Holmes, Gary Hug and Donald P. Pray.
- The main-belt asteroid 39890 Bobstephens, discovered by Petr Pravec in 1998, was named in his honor. The official naming citation was published by the Minor Planet Center on July 24, 2002 (M.P.C. 46112).

== See also ==
- American Association of Variable Star Observers
- RTMC Astronomy Expo
