= Milwaukee Astronomical Society =

American astronomy society

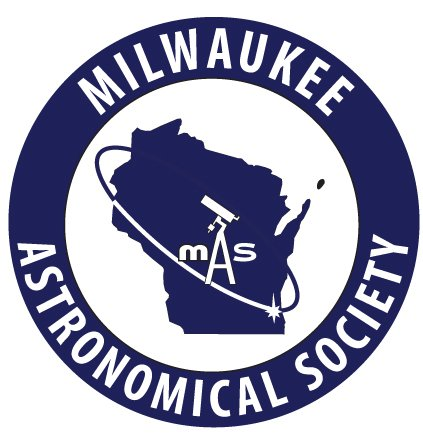
- Abbreviation: MAS
- Formation: 1932
- Legal status: non-profit Incorporated association
- Location: Milwaukee, Wisconsin, USA
- Coordinates: 42°58′07.57″N 88°08′53.89″W
- Members: 393 (November 2024)
- Publication: Focal Point
- Website: www.milwaukeeastro.org

The Milwaukee Astronomical Society (MAS) is a 501(c)(3) tax-exempt organization serving amateur astronomers in the greater Milwaukee area since 1932, making it one of the oldest continuously running astronomy clubs in the nation. The MAS operates one of the largest amateur club observatories in the world, and is a member of the Alliance of Historic Observatories. It currently has 393 members.

== History ==
The MAS was formed in 1932 with an ad taken out in The Milwaukee Journal of September 18 announcing an organizational meeting the following Wednesday at the home of Luverne Armfield. As a result of that meeting, the Milwaukee Astronomical Society was formed with 18 charter members. The club had regular observing sessions in Armfield's backyard, where there was an emphasis on scientific observation programs, especially variable stars, meteors, and lunar occultations. Notable early members were Edward A. Halbach, Walter Scott Houston, and William Albrecht. Growth would continue month by month and by the end of 1933, there would be 130 members.

In January 1934 a member, M.J.W. Phillips offered an acre of land for the establishment of an observatory outside Milwaukee in the Town of New Berlin. The land bordered a quiet road which would one day be named Observatory Road. The next month, the AAVSO offered the MAS a 13-inch plate glass mirror which they could use as long as the club pursued the study of variable stars. A telescope for that mirror was completed in October, 1934 and was installed in Armfield's backyard since the remote observatory was not yet established.

In 1935, Luverne Armfield along with J. Wesley Simpson, Director of the Missouri-Southern Illinois Observers (MSIO), formed a national organization, the American Amateur Astronomers Association (AAAA). It was a confederation of local societies modeled after the British Astronomical Association with its own publication, Amateur Astronomy (AA). Initial members were the MAS, MSIO, and the Madison Astronomical Society. The individual clubs consolidated their own newsletters into AA and traded information on scientific observing programs and eventually observatories and telescope making. It grew to 15 societies from throughout the United States, but folded in late 1938 when the publication of AA stopped.

Development of the Milwaukee Astronomical Society Observatory began in 1936 with the installation of an 8-inch, f/15 reflector in a roll-away shed. In 1937, construction began on a domed observatory. It was completed in March 1938 and the 13-inch telescope was installed. The observatory was formally dedicated in June.

With the donation of a 12.5" f/7.4 Newtonian reflector by member Ralph Buckstaff, in 1949 another domed observatory was constructed to house that instrument. A Quonset Hut was obtained through the Milwaukee Public Museum in 1955 which has served as the meeting/lecture hall ever since. In 1963 two additional acres of adjacent land were added. The following year the Armfield building was extended for the addition of 2 restrooms and a darkroom.

Under the directorship of Edward Halbach, the MAS joined Operation Moonwatch (aka Project Moonwatch) as another way for the club to make useful scientific contributions. The highlight of the program came in the early morning of September 5, 1962, when members Gale Highsmith, Leonard Schaefer, and Raymond Zit observed the re-entry of Sputnik 4, which allowed the recovery of some of the pieces which fell in and around Manitowoc, Wisconsin.

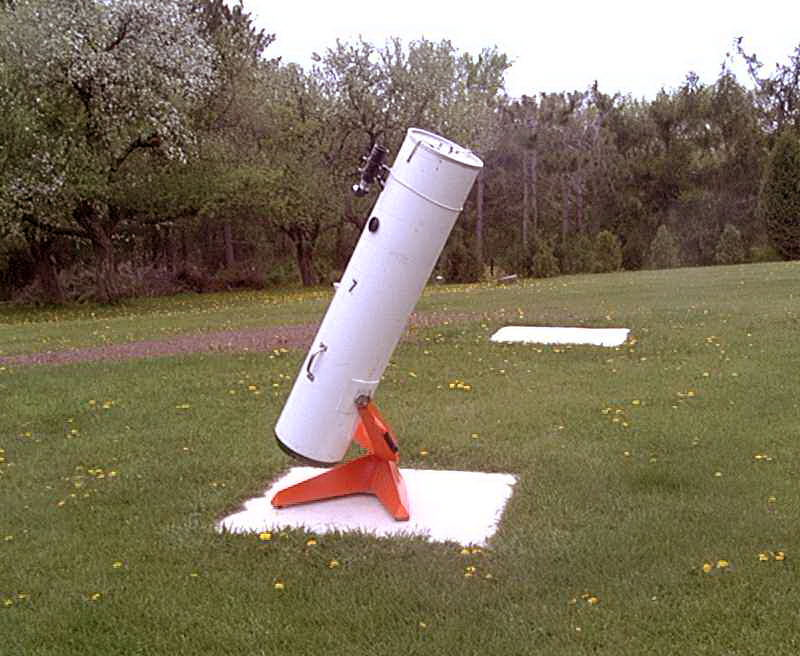
One of 12 "Portascopes" built by the MAS

In 1965 the MAS started a program of lunar grazing occultations. Observers were stationed along a 2-mile north–south line at 10th of a mile intervals for the timings. Because of largely inadequate telescopic equipment, from 1970 to 1974, the MAS designed and built 12 "portascopes," which were 10 inch f/5.6 reflectors on a fixed fork mount. Besides the grazes, they were used for general use, especially during the Open House nights. They also became the main instrumentation for the eclipsing binary program. The design won an award from the Royal Astronomical Society of Canada.

In 1980, under the direction of Gerry Samolyk, construction began for another domed observatory to house a 26-inch reflector with a promise that a 22-foot dome would be donated by Delco. When that fell thru, the MAS was forced to build the dome which was done in place.

== Observatory ==
The Milwaukee Astronomical Society Observatory comprises 3.1 acres (1.3 ha) at 18850 W Observatory Rd, in New Berlin, WI. The site currently has 9 observatories: 4 domed; 4 with a roll-off roof; and 1 flip-top. Viewing and imaging celestial objects is a major focus.

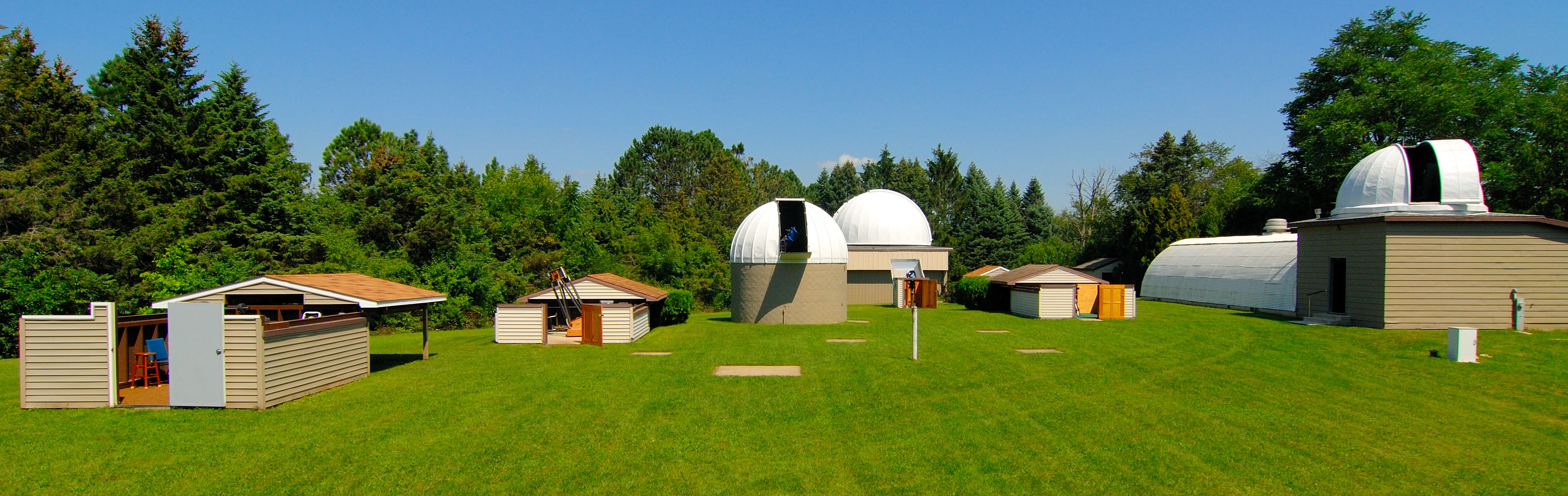
Milwaukee Astronomical Society Observatory Grounds - August 2021

== Membership ==
Membership in the MAS is open to anyone interested in astronomy without any age restrictions. Membership types are Family, Individual, and Student (under the age of 18).

== Meetings ==
Meetings are held at the MAS Observatory in the Quonset Meeting Hall. The Board of Directors meets monthly, while membership meetings run from September through May. "First Wednesday" meetings are held at the first Wednesday of each month for new members, and an astrophotography workshop is held via Zoom on the following Wednesday; both meetings are year-round and open to all MAS members. A summer picnic is held at the observatory, as well as a December Christmas party, both for members only.

== Events ==
The MAS holds a series of Open House nights at their observatory for the general public from late Spring to early Fall. The final Open House each year is the society's "Scary Sky" Open House, held on the last Friday before Halloween.

== Publications ==
The MAS publishes a monthly newsletter called the Focal Point.

== Associated organizations ==
The MAS is a charter member of the Astronomical League and is affiliated with the Night Sky Network.

== See also ==
- List of astronomical societies
- Astronomical League
- NASA Night Sky Network
