= Astronomy Now =

Monthly magazine

Astronomy Now is a monthly British magazine on astronomy and space. In an article published by the Royal Astronomical Society in 2012, Astronomy Now was characterized as the "principal amateur astronomy magazine in Britain" with a reputed circulation of 24,000.

The magazine features articles ranging from how to observe the night sky to the latest discoveries in the Solar System and in deep space. The first issue of Astronomy Now was published in April 1987 by Intra Press, initially as a quarterly publication, but it soon became monthly. It is published by Pole Star Publications Ltd.

== History ==
The first editor of Astronomy Now was Patrick Moore, who co-founded the magazine with original publisher Angelo Zgorelec, along with John Mason, Peter Cattermole, Ron Maddison, Iain Nicolson and Art Editor Paul Doherty. Subsequent editors have included Martin Beech, Timothy Lyster, Fiona Gammie, Steven Young, Pam Spence, Paul Parsons and Keith Cooper. The current editor is Stuart Clark.

== Regular sections ==
Each issue contains a host of regular sections. These include:

- News Update, reviewing major news stories over the last month.
- The Night Sky – details of how to find the planets, deep sky challenges, double star of the month, Moonwatch by lunar expert Peter Grego, a section for Southern Hemisphere observers, a 'sky tour' with star charts and graphics from technical Illustrator Greg Smye–Rumsby. Other regular contributors include Martin Mobberley, Owen Brazell, Tony Markham and the magazine's Night Sky Consultant, supernova-discoverer Mark Armstrong. In 2007 a 'Light Pollution Corner' was added, detailing advances in the battle against light pollution, written by Bob Mizon of the Campaign for Dark Skies.
- Absolute Beginners – Carole Stott's two-page guide for newcomers to astronomy.
- In the Shops, the magazine's reviews section where telescopes, binoculars, mounts, eyepieces and all other kinds of astro-paraphernalia are assessed by regular reviewers including Steve Ringwood and Ade Ashford. There is also a two-page book reviews section, including a regular interview with a book author.
- Key Moments, – Ian Seymour's monthly exploration of the quirkier aspects of astronomical history. One of the longest running features in the magazine, written by the same contributor since 1992.
- Picture Gallery – astrophotos submitted by the magazine's readers, with commentary on the 'picture of the month' by astrophotographer Nik Szymanek. There is also a regular section showcasing the work of the Faulkes Telescopes led by Daniel Duggan.
- Society News – News and information about UK astronomical societies, plus "Astrolistings" – an extensive programme of forthcoming events and lectures held by societies across the UK.
- Tech talk – Martin Mobberley's guide to overcoming technical problems for the hands-on observer.
- Ask an Astronomer is a part of the magazine where readers' astronomy questions are answered by Edward Herrick-Gleason.

== Feature articles ==
The articles in the magazine are aimed at both amateur and armchair astronomers, as well as being of general interest to professional astronomers. Examples of articles published in the last two years include in-depth reviews of missions such as the Lunar Reconnaissance Orbiter and the Lunar Crater Observation and Sensing Satellite, MESSENGER's flybys of Mercury, Planck, Herschel, the Hubble Space Telescope and more, and articles on the latest theories in cosmology, galaxy and star formation, planets and moons, plus telescopes and the latest observing technology.

== Focus ==
As well as the five or six feature articles in each issue to go alongside the regular sections, each issue contains a 'Focus' section to provide an in-depth look at a chosen area. Recent 'Focus' topics have included the lives of stars, gas giants, the search for extraterrestrial intelligence, emanations from the Sun, gamma ray astronomy, and maps of the Universe.

== Special editions ==
In addition to the twelve monthly issues of Astronomy Now per year, there are also occasional special issues. A Yearbook is also released each autumn.

- The Grand Tour of the Universe

Written by Keith Cooper, this is a 100-page journey from our planet Earth, past the other planets of the Solar System and out into deep space, to the farthest depths of the Universe. Lavishly illustrated with full-colour images from the Hubble Space Telescope, the Spitzer Space Telescope, the Mars rovers, Cassini, the Voyager spacecraft and many other space missions, this is an introduction to our Universe, with detailed information on each planet, moon, star, nebulae and galaxy presented within. The Grand Tour was released in autumn 2006.

- Infinity Rising

A collection of pictures of the night sky and guide to the art of astrophotography by Nik Szymanek released in summer 2005, for those who want to follow in Nik's footsteps as an astrophotographer to those that simply want to admire Nik's graceful images of galaxies, nebulae, the Moon and the various exotic locations and mountain-top observatories.

- Exploring Mars

Written by Neil English, this pictorial history of the robotic exploration of Mars was made to coincide with the 2004 landing of twin rovers Spirit and Opportunity. Exploring Mars includes the rovers’ first pictures of Mars.

- The 3-D Universe

The 3-D Universe features over 155 three-dimensional images of the Universe, many created by technical Illustrator Greg Smye–Rumsby, each copy comes with a pair of 3D glasses.

- Yearbooks

Edited by the editor of Astronomy Now, and written by many of the magazine's regular contributors, the 132-page Yearbooks are released annually. They include a full observing guide for the full year ahead, plus a mix of interviews and articles on various aspects of astronomy.

== AstroFest ==
AstroFest is an annual exhibition and conference celebrating astronomy and space exploration, held by Astronomy Now magazine at Kensington Conference and Events Centre in west London. It is a two-day event, taking place over a Friday and a Saturday usually in the first half of February (2020: Friday 31 January and Saturday 1 February). A trade show consisting of dozens of exhibitors and telescope dealers covers three floors of the town hall. Visitors can meet the Astronomy Now editors and contributors and discuss the magazine with them.

The accompanying conference programme presents top speakers from the UK and overseas. Past speakers have included Maggie Aderin-Pocock, Alan Bond, Ted Bowell, Jocelyn Bell Burnell, Allan Chapman, Carol Christian, Alberto Conti, Brian Cox, Michele Dougherty, Carlos Frenk, Douglas Gough, Monica Grady, Eva Grebel, David A. Hardy, Lucy Hawking, David Hughes, Robin Ince, Mat Irvine, Helen Keen, Rob Kennicutt, Jim Al-Khalili, Ed Krupp, David H. Levy, Chris Lintott, Keith Mason, Brian May, Fulvio Melia, Simon Mitton, Stephen O’Meara, Martin Rees, Ian Ridpath, Chris Riley, Seth Shostak, Simon Singh, Stephen Smartt, David Southwood, Jill Tarter, David Whitehouse, and John Zarnecki.

== Lifetime achievement award ==
The magazine presents the Astronomy Now Lifetime Achievement Award from time to time at AstroFest. The first three winners were Iain Nicolson (2015), Ian Ridpath (2017), and Allan Chapman (2023).
