= Clifford W. Holmes Award =

Award in astronomy

The Clifford W. Holmes Award is presented annually near Big Bear City, California, at the RTMC Astronomy Expo to an individual for a significant contribution to popularizing astronomy.

Established in 1978 by Richard Poremba as the Astronomy for America Award, it was renamed for Clifford W. Holmes, the founder of the Riverside Telescope Makers Conference (RTMC) in 1980.

== Awardees ==
Recipients of the award are:

- 1978: Paul Zurakowski
- 1979: Arthur Leonard
- 1980: Robert E. Cox
- 1981: Richard Berry
- 1982: Dennis di Cicco
- 1983: John Dobson
- 1984: Jim Jacobson
- 1985: Arthur Leonard
- 1986: Bob Schalck
- 1987: Clyde Tombaugh
- 1988: Kevin Medlock
- 1989: David H. Levy
- 1990: Dick Buchroeder, (MP-cite)
- 1991: Rick Shaffer
- 1992: Ashley McDermott
- 1993: John Sanford
- 1994: Donald C. Parker
- 1995: Don Machholz
- 1996: Gil Clark
- 1997: Randall Wilcox
- 1998: Randy Johnson
- 1999: William Seavey
- 2000: Tom Cave
- 2001: Scott W. Roberts
- 2002: Ed Krupp
- 2003: Steve Edberg
- 2004: Dean Ketelsen
- 2005: Mike Simmons
- 2006: Al Fink
- 2007: Dave Rodrigues
- 2008: Laura and Bob Eklund
- 2009: Don Nicholson
- 2010: David Crawford (spcl. award (Note: Special awards to Mount Wilson Observatory staff for motivating firefighters during the Station Fire: Hal and Susan McAlister, Dave Jurasevich and Larry Webster))
- 2011: Robert Victor
- 2012: Robert D. Stephens
- 2013: Jim Benet
- 2014: Jane Houston-Jones
- 2015: Terri Lappin (MP-cite)
- 2016: Randy and Pamela Shivak

== See also ==
- List of astronomy awards
