= V454 Carinae =

Multiple star system in the constellation Carina

Observation data Epoch J2000.0 Equinox ICRS
- Constellation: Carina
- Right ascension: 07^{h} 32^{m} 46.15^{s}
- Declination: −53° 33′ 18.9″
- Apparent magnitude (V): 6.96 to 7.16

Characteristics
- Spectral type: B4V + B5V
- B−V color index: −0.1
- Variable type: Algol

Astrometry
Proper motion (μ)	RA: −7.595±0.103 mas/yr Dec.: +8.197±0.116 mas/yr
Parallax (π)	1.8681±0.0451 mas
Distance	1,750 ± 40 ly (540 ± 10 pc)

Details

Aa
Mass	4.6±0.4 M_{☉}
Radius	2.83±0.18 R_{☉}
Temperature	17500 K

Ab
Mass	4.4±0.4 M_{☉}
Radius	2.74±0.16 R_{☉}
Temperature	15,500 K

B
Mass	4.5±0.5 M_{☉}
Radius	2.78±0.16 R_{☉}
Temperature	15,000 K
Age	~30 Myr

Other designations
- V454 Car, HD 60649, HIP 36682, SAO 235233

Database references
SIMBAD	data

V454 Carinae (also known as HD 60649) is a multiple star system located in the southern constellation Carina. It consists of at least three gravitationally bound stars: a close eclipsing binary (component A) orbited by a third, spectroscopically distinct companion (component B). All three stars are young, early B-type objects near the zero-age main sequence. The system is a candidate runaway star, most probably ejected from the Vela region of Gould's Belt approximately 30 million years ago.

== Observation history ==
The photometric variability of V454 Carinae was discovered by the Hipparcos satellite in 1997, which identified it as an eclipsing binary under the designation HIP 36682. The Hipparcos light curve led to an initial EW-type (W UMa) classification, though the General Catalogue of Variable Stars (GCVS) adopted the EB type (Beta Lyrae variable). The system was spectroscopically classified as B4V + B5V in Volume I of the Michigan Catalogue, which covers declinations between −90° and −53°.

The initial Hipparcos parallax placed V454 Car at approximately 980 pc; this estimate was later found to be unreliable owing to the complex multiple nature of the system. The revised Gaia DR2 distance of 535±22 pc is consistent with the photometric distance of ~500 pc derived from detailed modelling.

Prior to 2015, little had been published specifically about V454 Carinae. Eggen (1986) examined stars brighter than V = 7.1 as candidate members of the Hyades and Sirius superclusters, and rejected V454 Car from both groups. Tetzlaff, Neuhäuser & Hohle (2011) included it among 2,353 runaway star candidates within 3 kpc of the Sun identified from Hipparcos space velocities, assigning the system a total mass of 8.3±0.4 M_{☉} and an age of 33.2±5.3 Myr.

The first spectroscopic study was conducted by Özkardeş et al. (2015), who obtained high-resolution spectra at Mount John University Observatory during 2009–2014 and revealed the triple nature of the system, deriving preliminary radial velocities for the inner eclipsing pair. A comprehensive combined photometric and spectroscopic analysis was subsequently published by Butland et al. (2019), drawing on spectra collected at Mount John during 2008–2018 and new DSLR photometry from Congarinni Observatory, New South Wales, Australia.

== Stellar system ==
The combined apparent magnitude of the system is approximately V ≈ 7.0 (B − V ≈ −0.1). The photometric distance is ~500 pc, confirmed by Gaia DR2 at 535±22 pc. The system age is estimated at 30 Myr, and all three components are young near-main-sequence early B-type stars.

=== Inner binary (component A) ===
The principal component of V454 Carinae is a close eclipsing binary, V454 Car A, whose two stars (Aa and Ab) orbit each other with a period of 0.980417 days (~23.5 hours). The eclipses are of comparable depth and small total amplitude (~0.2 mag), consistent with a low orbital inclination and a significant contribution of third light from component B.

Modelling of the combined light and radial velocity curves yielded the following absolute parameters for the inner binary: Both stars are near the zero-age main sequence, consistent with the system's estimated age of ~30 Myr.

=== Third component (component B) ===
A third spectroscopically distinct star (component B) was first identified by Özkardeş et al. (2015) and characterised in detail by Butland et al. (2019). Component B and the inner binary appear to be in an eccentric mutual orbit with a period of approximately 1,900 days (~5.2 years). The derived parameters are mass 4.5±0.5 M_{☉}, radius 2.78±0.16 R_{☉}, and effective temperature of about 15,000 K. Radial velocities of component B show irregularities on a timescale of about one week, suggesting additional, as yet unresolved, complexity within that component.

== Variability ==
V454 Carinae is classified as a Beta Lyrae-type (EB) eclipsing binary in the GCVS. Its variability, with a peak-to-peak amplitude of ~0.2 mag and the orbital period of the inner pair of 0.980417 d, was first detected by the Hipparcos satellite. The small amplitude results from a combination of low orbital inclination and dilution by light from the third component. Both primary and secondary eclipses are present and of similar depth; the EB classification (rather than EW) is preferred because the ingress and egress of each eclipse are clearly distinguishable, indicating that the stars do not form a contact binary.

Photometric monitoring has been carried out under the Southern Eclipsing Binaries Programme of the Variable Stars South (VSS) section of the Royal Astronomical Society of New Zealand (RASNZ).
