= 6398 Timhunter =

Stony Phocaea asteroid

Discovery
- Discovered by: C. S. Shoemaker; E. M. Shoemaker; D. H. Levy
- Discovery site: Palomar Obs.
- Discovery date: 10 February 1991

Designations
- Named after: Tim Hunter (amateur astronomer)
- Alternative designations: 1991 CD_{1} · 1955 DB; 1988 PG
- Minor planet category: main-belt · Phocaea

Orbital characteristics
- Epoch 4 September 2017 (JD 2458000.5)
- Uncertainty parameter 0
- Observation arc: 62.19 yr (22,716 days)
- Aphelion: 2.8684 AU
- Perihelion: 1.8179 AU
- Semi-major axis: 2.3431 AU
- Eccentricity: 0.2242
- Orbital period (sidereal): 3.59 yr (1,310 days)
- Mean anomaly: 119.46°
- Mean motion: 0° 16^{m} 29.28^{s} / day
- Inclination: 23.856°
- Longitude of ascending node: 128.98°
- Argument of perihelion: 67.697°

Physical characteristics
- Dimensions: 5.20±1.11 km 5.528±0.112 km 5.79 km (calculated)
- Synodic rotation period: 7.1074±0.0007 h 14.55±0.01 h (Note: Pravec (2009) web: lightcurve plot of (6398) Timhunter with a rotation period of 14.55±0.01 hours and a brightness amplitude of 0.29 mag. Summary figures at Collaborative Asteroid Lightcurve Link and Ondrejov Asteroid Photometry Project)
- Geometric albedo: 0.23 (assumed); 0.27±0.12; 0.333±0.049
- Spectral type: S
- Absolute magnitude (H): 13.1 · 13.4 · 13.59±0.81 · 13.63

6398 Timhunter, provisional designation 1991 CD_{1}, is a stony Phocaea asteroid from the inner regions of the asteroid belt, approximately 5.5 kilometers in diameter. It was discovered on 10 February 1991, by American astronomer couple Carolyn and Eugene Shoemaker, in collaboration with Canadian astronomer David H. Levy at Palomar Observatory in California, United States. It was named for American amateur astronomer Tim Hunter.

== Classification an orbit ==
The stony S-type asteroid is a member of the Phocaea family (701), a relatively small group of asteroids with similar orbital characteristics. Timhunter orbits the Sun in the inner main-belt at a distance of 1.8–2.9 AU once every 3 years and 7 months (1,310 days). Its orbit has an eccentricity of 0.22 and an inclination of 24° with respect to the ecliptic. It was first identified as 1955 DB at Goethe Link Observatory in 1955, extending the body's observation arc by 36 years prior to its official discovery observation at Palomar.

== Lightcurves ==
In March 2009, a rotational lightcurve of Timhunter was obtained from photometric observations by astronomer Petr Pravec at the Ondřejov Observatory in the Czech Republic. Lightcurve analysis gave a well-defined rotation period of 14.55 hours with a brightness variation of 0.29 magnitude (U=3). One month later, another lightcurve was obtained by French amateur astronomers David Romeuf, Maurice Audejean and René Roy, which gave an alternative period solution of 7.1074 hours with an amplitude of 0.32 magnitude (U=2-).

== Diameter and albedo ==
According to the survey carried out by NASA's Wide-field Infrared Survey Explorer with its subsequent NEOWISE mission, Timhunter measures 5.20 and 5.528 kilometers in diameter, and its surface has an albedo of 0.333 and 0.27. respectively. The Collaborative Asteroid Lightcurve Link assumes an albedo of 0.23 – derived from 25 Phocaea, the Phocaea family's namesake – and calculates a diameter of 5.79 kilometers, based on an absolute magnitude of 13.4.

== Naming ==
This minor planet was named after Tim Hunter, an American radiologist and amateur astronomer. Together with David Crawford he co-founded the non-profit International Dark-Sky Association with the aim to preserve and protect Earth's night sky from light pollution. The approved naming citation was published by the Minor Planet Center on 1 June 1996 (M.P.C. 27330).
