= Ben Mayer =

American astronomer

Ben Mayer (1925 in Germany – 28 December 1999) was an amateur astronomer perhaps best known for the invention of the projection blink comparator (PROBLICOM), a low-cost version of the blink comparator. This inexpensive tool allowed amateur astronomers to contribute to some phases of serious research. Professionally, Mayer worked as an interior designer.

Mayer was the first ever to photograph a nova in its brightening phase. On the night of August 29, 1975, Mayer was using an automatic camera to photograph the sky, hoping to track meteors large enough to survive entry into the Earth's atmosphere. After learning of the nova, he realized it was in the part of the sky he was photographing. He retrieved his negatives from the trash (there were no meteors on the photographs) and found a series of images of Nova Cygni 1975 in several stages of brightening.

Mayer was a member of the American Association of Variable Star Observers and a frequent lecturer at the Riverside Telescope Makers Conference. In 1982 he won the Amateur Achievement Award of the Astronomical Society of the Pacific. Perhaps the best words summarizing Mayer's contributions and style appeared in The Griffith Observer memorial as written by Ed Krupp, Director of the Griffith Observatory in the June, 2000 edition (Vol 64, No. 6).

== Death ==
Mayer died on December 28, 1999, at the age of 74.

Preceded by George Alcock	Amateur Achievement Award of Astronomical Society of the Pacific; 1982	Succeeded by Jay U. Gunter
