= James McMahon (astronomer) =

American astronomer

James McMahon is an American amateur astronomer, acknowledged for his visual observations of asteroid occultations. In 1978 his observation of the occultation of the asteroid 532 Herculina with the star SAO 120774, together with photometric study made at the Lowell Observatory, was considered a proof of the existence of a Herculina's natural satellite, which would be the first discovery of an asteroid moon in history. However, a 1993 Hubble Space Telescope observation failed to confirm the discovery.

In 1979 James McMahon was the first person awarded with the newly established Amateur Achievement Award of the Astronomical Society of the Pacific.

Preceded by none	Amateur Achievement Award of Astronomical Society of the Pacific; 1979	Succeeded by Frank Bateson
