= Walter H. Haas =

American astronomer

Walter H. Haas (July 3, 1917 – April 6, 2015) was an American amateur astronomer. He started observing in the 1930s. After the Second World War he founded the Association of Lunar and Planetary Observers (ALPO) and served there as the executive director between 1947 and the mid-1980s. Since then he had been a member of the board of directors as the Director Emeritus.

He received several awards for his contributions to astronomy: the Astronomical League Award in 1952, the Amateur Achievement Award of the Astronomical Society of the Pacific in 1994 and the Presidential Award of the Astronomical League in 2004.

Preceded by David H. Levy	Amateur Achievement Award of Astronomical Society of the Pacific; 1994	Succeeded by Donald C. Parker
