= Oscar Monnig =

American amateur astronomer

Oscar Edwin Monnig MBE
- Born: 4 September 1902; Fort Worth, Texas, U.S.
- Died: 4 May 1999 (aged 96); Fort Worth, Texas, U.S.
- Known for: Contributions to meteoritics
- Spouse: Juanita Mickle (m. 1941; died 1996)

Oscar E. Monnig (September 4, 1902 – May 4, 1999) was an American amateur astronomer, acknowledged for his contributions to meteoritics.

== Private life ==
Monnig was born in Fort Worth, Texas. In 1925, he received a law degree from the University of Texas. He worked for the family dry goods business and was its president from 1974 to 1981, when it was sold.

In 1941 he married Juanita Mickle, who died in 1996. They had no children. Monnig died in the city where he was born on May 4, 1999.

== Astronomy ==
In the 1920s Monnig started to be interested in astronomy. He founded the Texas Observers astronomy club and between 1931 and 1947 he published a monthly newsletter – the Texas Observers Bulletin – writing especially about issues of amateur astronomers' interest, such as variable stars, meteors, comets, and the planets.

In the late-1920s, Monnig developed an interest in meteorites and their contribution to astronomers' studies on the origins of the Solar System. He was a founding member of the Society for Research on Meteorites (later renamed Meteoritical Society).

=== Meteoritical collection ===
In the early-1930s he started his own meteoritical collection. After he failed with his requests to be allowed to study meteorites at the Smithsonian Institution, the Field Museum, and the American Museum of Natural History, he increased his collecting effort.

He questioned witnesses of meteoroid detonations or bolides and organized and financed searching expeditions. He paid 1 dollar per pound, a price that museums could not match at the time of the Great Depression.

Gradually, his collection grew to be one of the largest private collections in the world: it contained about 3,000 specimens from 400 different meteorites. Probably the most valuable were two carbonaceous chondrites, found at Crescent, Oklahoma, in 1936 and at Bells, Texas, in 1961.

Monnig later decided to donate the collection to Texas Christian University: he made a series of transfers, between 1976 and 1986. Nowadays, the collection contains over 2,500 different meteorites. In 2003, four years after he died, the Oscar E. Monnig Meteorite Gallery was opened, exhibiting about 10 per cent of the meteorites to the public.

The numbering system Monnig used to label his collection is a topic of great intrigue, as scientists and meteorite specialists believe that Monnig's collection numbers are an "intriguing, perhaps almost magical...a tangible link with researchers and collectors who have gone before us," as stated by Geoff Notkin. Scientists have concluded that it is likely that Monnig used a similar labeling system as Harvey H. Nininger.

=== Awards ===
In 1984, Monnig became the first person to win the Texas Star Party's annual 'Lone Stargazer Award' for his accomplishments as an observer in amateur astronomy In 1990, he received the Amateur Achievement Award of the Astronomical Society of the Pacific for his contributions to meteoritics. The main belt asteroid 2780 Monnig was named in his honour.

Preceded by Paul Baize	Amateur Achievement Award of Astronomical Society of the Pacific; 1990	Succeeded by Otto Kippes
