= 1780 Kippes =

Eoan asteroid

Discovery
- Discovered by: A. Kopff
- Discovery site: Heidelberg Obs.
- Discovery date: 12 September 1906

Designations
- Named after: Otto Kippes (priest and astronomer)
- Alternative designations: A906 RA · 1935 CC; 1938 UC_{1} · 1943 TL; 1943 VD · 1947 NB; 1951 ED_{2} · 1953 SA; 1957 LD · 1962 JU; 1969 RB_{2} · 1975 VL_{6} A911 QE
- Minor planet category: main-belt · (outer); Eos

Orbital characteristics
- Epoch 4 September 2017 (JD 2458000.5)
- Uncertainty parameter 0
- Observation arc: 110.38 yr (40,315 days)
- Aphelion: 3.1792 AU
- Perihelion: 2.8538 AU
- Semi-major axis: 3.0165 AU
- Eccentricity: 0.0539
- Orbital period (sidereal): 5.24 yr (1,914 days)
- Mean anomaly: 147.84°
- Mean motion: 0° 11^{m} 17.16^{s} / day
- Inclination: 9.0022°
- Longitude of ascending node: 290.98°
- Argument of perihelion: 340.31°

Physical characteristics
- Dimensions: 25.77±0.80 km 27.92±1.8 km 28.164±0.241 km 29.16±0.38 km 31.262±0.341 km
- Synodic rotation period: 18.0 h
- Geometric albedo: 0.0966±0.0173; 0.111±0.014; 0.1212±0.017; 0.126±0.013; 0.143±0.010
- Spectral type: S
- Absolute magnitude (H): 10.68 · 10.72±0.26

1780 Kippes, provisional designation A906 RA, is an Eoan asteroid from the outer regions of the asteroid belt, approximately 28 kilometers in diameter. It was discovered on 12 September 1906, by astronomer August Kopff at the Heidelberg-Königstuhl State Observatory in southwest Germany. The asteroid was named after German Catholic priest and amateur astronomer Otto Kippes.

== Orbit and classification ==
Kippes is a member the Eos family (606), the largest asteroid family of the outer main belt consisting of nearly 10,000 asteroids. It orbits the Sun in the outer main-belt at a distance of 2.9–3.2 AU once every 5 years and 3 months (1,914 days). Its orbit has an eccentricity of 0.05 and an inclination of 9° with respect to the ecliptic.

The body's observation arc begins at Heidelberg in 1906, one week after its official discovery observation.

== Physical characteristics ==
Kippes is an assumed S-type asteroid, while the overall spectral type of the Eos family is that of a K-type.

=== Rotation period ===
In July 1984, a rotational lightcurve of Kippes was obtained from photometric observations by astronomer Richard P. Binzel at the CTIO and McDonald Observatory. Lightcurve analysis gave a rotation period of 18.0 hours with a brightness amplitude of 0.23 magnitude (U=2).

=== Diameter and albedo ===
According to the surveys carried out by the Infrared Astronomical Satellite IRAS, the Japanese Akari satellite and the NEOWISE mission of NASA's Wide-field Infrared Survey Explorer, Kippes measures between 25.77 and 31.262 kilometers in diameter and its surface has an albedo between 0.0966 and 0.143.

The Collaborative Asteroid Lightcurve Link adopts the results obtained by IRAS, that is, an albedo of 0.1212 and a diameter of 27.92 kilometers based on an absolute magnitude of 10.68.

== Naming ==
This minor planet was named after German Catholic priest and amateur astronomer Otto Kippes (1905–1994). He was a precise observer, acknowledged for his orbit calculations and identifications of hundreds of minor planets in widely separated oppositions. The official naming citation was published by the Minor Planet Center on 15 June 1973 (M.P.C. 3508).
