= The Minor Planet Bulletin =

- Discipline: Astronomy
- Language: English
- Edited by: Richard P. Binzel

Publication details
- History: 1973–present
- Publisher: Association of Lunar and Planetary Observers
- Frequency: Quarterly
- Open access: Yes

Standard abbreviations
- ISO 4: Minor Planet Bull.

Indexing
- ISSN: 1052-8091
- OCLC no.: 643727637

Links
- Journal homepage

The Minor Planet Bulletin is a quarterly peer-reviewed open-access scientific journal. Its focus is on theoretical, observational, and historical information regarding the study of minor planets. The journal mainly targets amateur research, but it includes professional research as well. It has been published by the Minor Planets section of the Association of Lunar and Planetary Observers since 1973 and the editor-in-chief is Richard P. Binzel (Massachusetts Institute of Technology).

== Operations ==
All editorial, production, and distribution tasks are performed on a volunteer basis, many by amateur astronomers.

== See also ==
- List of astronomy journals
