= Sonia Keys =

American astronomer (1961–2018)

Sonia Keys (1961 – August 13, 2018), formerly known as Kyle Smalley, was an American amateur astronomer and a discoverer of minor planets. She worked as an astronomer and software developer at the Minor Planet Center. Asteroid 36445 Smalley was named after her.

== Biography ==
As an electronics technician and nuclear reactor operator, she had served in the United States Navy aboard a submarine and was honorably discharged in 1982. In 1986, she completed her bachelor's degree in Mathematics and Computer Science at the University of Central Missouri.

Keys was engaged in the study of near-Earth asteroids and developed procedures to search lost asteroids. She was a member of the Astronomical Society of Kansas City and most of her observations were made at their Powell Observatory in Kansas. She also worked as a consultant at the Minor Planet Center (MPC) of the International Astronomical Union. The asteroid 36445 Smalley, discovered by amateur astronomer Larry Robinson at the Sunflower Observatory (739) in August 2000, was named in her honor. The official naming citation was published by the MPC on September 21, 2002 (M.P.C. 46685). In 2003 she won the Amateur Achievement Award of the Astronomical Society of the Pacific. She died of cancer in Cambridge, Massachusetts on August 13, 2018. On 25 March 2021, the MPC credited her with the discovery of asteroid (550830) 2012 TV_{233}, first observed at the Powell Observatory on 14 August 2001.

== See also ==
- List of minor planet discoverers § K. Smalley

Preceded by Syuichi Nakano	Amateur Achievement Award of Astronomical Society of the Pacific; 2003	Succeeded by Nik Szymanek
