= Richard D. Lines =

American astronomer (1916–1992)

Richard D. Lines (April 21, 1916 – June 29, 1992) was an American amateur astronomer. He started as a deep-sky observer and photographer, but later specialized in photometry of variable stars. He was a member of the American Association of Variable Star Observers and International Amateur-Professional Photoelectric Photometry (I.A.P.P.P.).

Together with his wife Helen Chambliss Lines, also a keen astronomer, he built a small observatory in Mayer, Arizona. In 1962 he co-discovered the comet Seki-Lines. In 1992 he and his wife won the Amateur Achievement Award of the Astronomical Society of the Pacific for their work in the field of photoelectric photometry of variable stars. Short time after he was awarded, Richard Lines died. In 1994 the I.A.P.P.P. announced that its annual Special Award in Astronomy would carry his name as the Richard D. Lines Special Award in Astronomy.

Preceded by Otto Kippes	Amateur Achievement Award of Astronomical Society of the Pacific (together with Helen Lines); 1992	Succeeded by David H. Levy
