= Edward A. Halbach =

American amateur astronomer

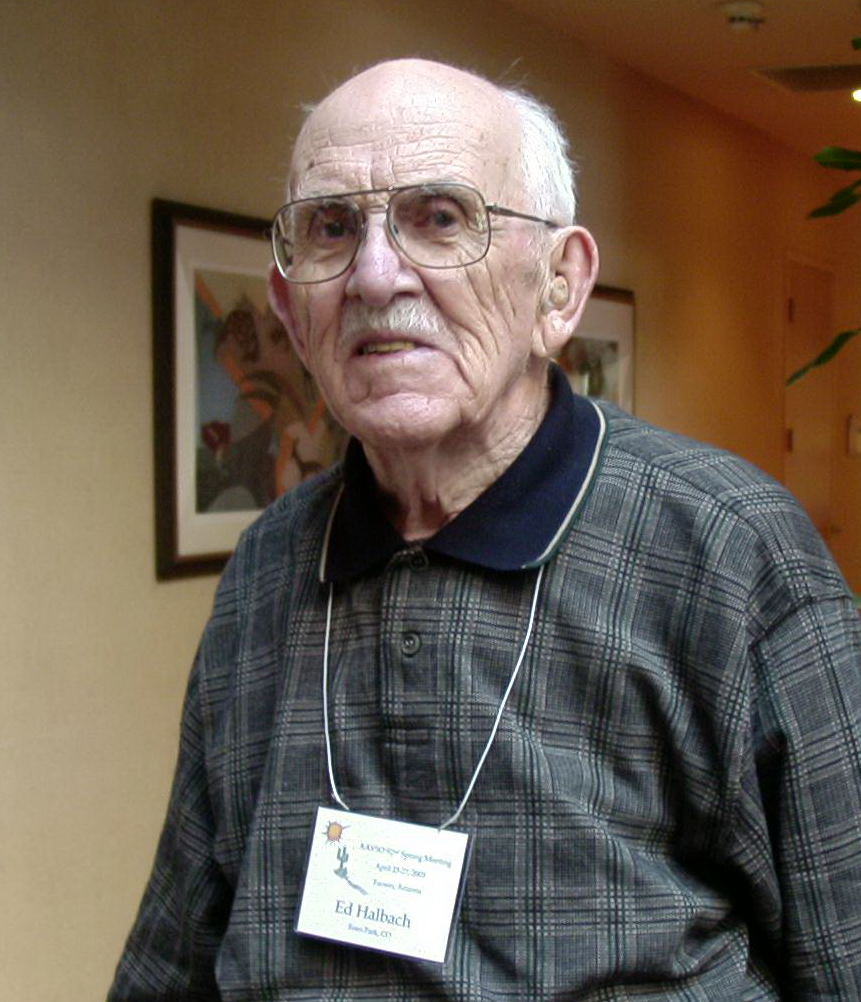
- Halbach in 2003 at the Spring AAVSO Meeting
- Born: April 5, 1909; Canby, Minnesota, United States
- Died: March 20, 2011 (aged 101)
- Education: Marquette University
- Occupation: Engineer
- Employer(s): AC-Delco, Allis-Chalmers, & Siemens-Allis

Edward A. Halbach (April 5, 1909 – March 20, 2011) was an American amateur astronomer and prolific variable star observer.

He developed his interest in astronomy in 1933. One year later he became a member of the American Association of Variable Star Observers (AAVSO). He was also one of the first members of the Milwaukee Astronomical Society and directed its observatory for 35 years. In 1947 he was elected the first official president of the Astronomical League. Besides his numerous variable star observations he was interested also in solar astronomy and occultations.

== Acknowledgement ==
The Astronomical League awarded Edward Halbach with the Astronomical League Award in 1972. Halbach was the first living recipient of the Leslie C. Peltier Award in 1981 for his variable star and lunar occultation observations and contributions to artificial satellite programs. The American Association of Variable Star Observers honoured him with the Merit Award in 1988, for his record of more than 50,000 observations in the AAVSO International Database and for 54-year service in the society.

He also won the Amateur Achievement Award of the Astronomical Society of the Pacific for his variable star and occultation observations in 1997. In 2003 he was awarded the William Tyler Olcott Award of the AAVSO, acknowledging him, among others, as a promoter of variable star observing and a mentor of amateur astronomers. By that time he contributed to the society's database with over 98,000 observations.

The Milwaukee Astronomical Society named one of their two 12.5 inches (32 cm) telescopes the "Edward A. Halbach Telescope" in his honour. On April 7, 2009 he celebrated his 100th birthday, a landmark that was noted on the NBC television program Today.

Preceded by Michiel Daniel Overbeek	Amateur Achievement Award of Astronomical Society of the Pacific; 1997	Succeeded by Albert F. A. L. Jones
