= V382 Velorum =

1999 Nova seen in the constellation Vela

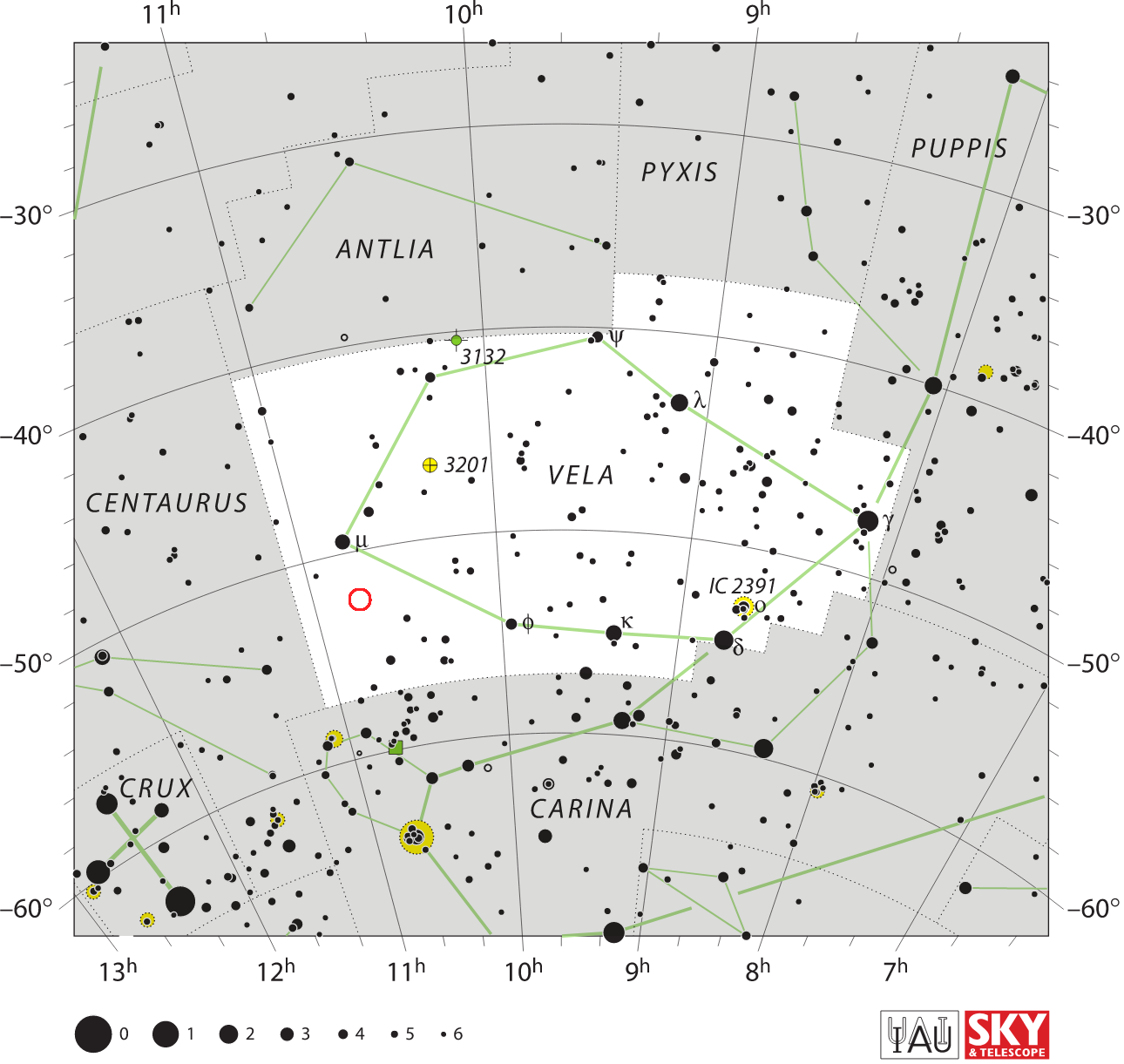
- Location of V382 Velorum (circled in red)

Observation data Epoch J2000.0 Equinox ICRS
- Constellation: Vela
- Right ascension: 10^{h} 44^{m} 48.3978^{s}
- Declination: −52° 25′ 31.169″
- Apparent magnitude (V): 2.8 Max. 16.6 Min.

Characteristics
- Variable type: Nova

Astrometry
Proper motion (μ)	RA: −11.885±0.083 mas/yr Dec.: 2.690±0.079 mas/yr
Parallax (π)	0.5599±0.0547 mas
Distance	1800+243 −133 pc

Other designations
- Nova Vel 1999, AAVSO 1040-51, Gaia DR2 5354475121660180096

Database references
SIMBAD	data

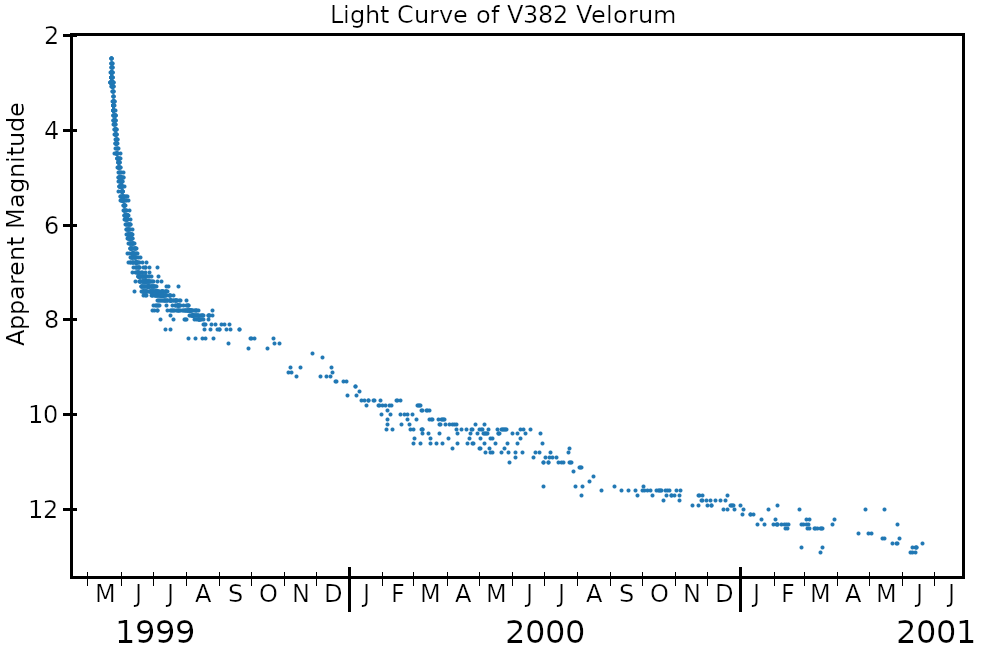
The light curve of V382 Velorum, plotted from AAVSO data

V382 Velorum, also known as Nova Velorum 1999, was a bright nova which occurred in 1999 in the southern constellation Vela. V382 Velorum reached a brightness of 2.6 magnitude, making it easily visible to the naked eye. It was discovered by Peter Williams of Heathcote, New South Wales, Australia at 09:30 UT on 22 May 1999. Later that same day it was discovered independently at 10:49 UT by Alan C. Gilmore at Mount John University Observatory in New Zealand.

In its quiescent state, V382 Velorum has a mean visual magnitude of 16.56. It is classified as a fast nova with a smooth light curve.

Like all novae, V382 Velorum is a binary system with two stars orbiting so close to each other that one star, the "donor" star, transfers matter to its companion star which is a white dwarf. The orbital period is 3.5 hours. The white dwarf in this system has a mass of 1.23 M_{☉}. V382 Velorum is a neon nova, a relatively rare type of nova with a O-Ne-Mg white dwarf, rather than the more common C-O white dwarf.

The stars forming V382 Velorum are surrounded by a small emission nebula about 10 arc seconds in diameter.

== See also ==
- List of novae in the Milky Way galaxy
- Supernova
