= C/1998 P1 (Williams) =

Non-periodic comet

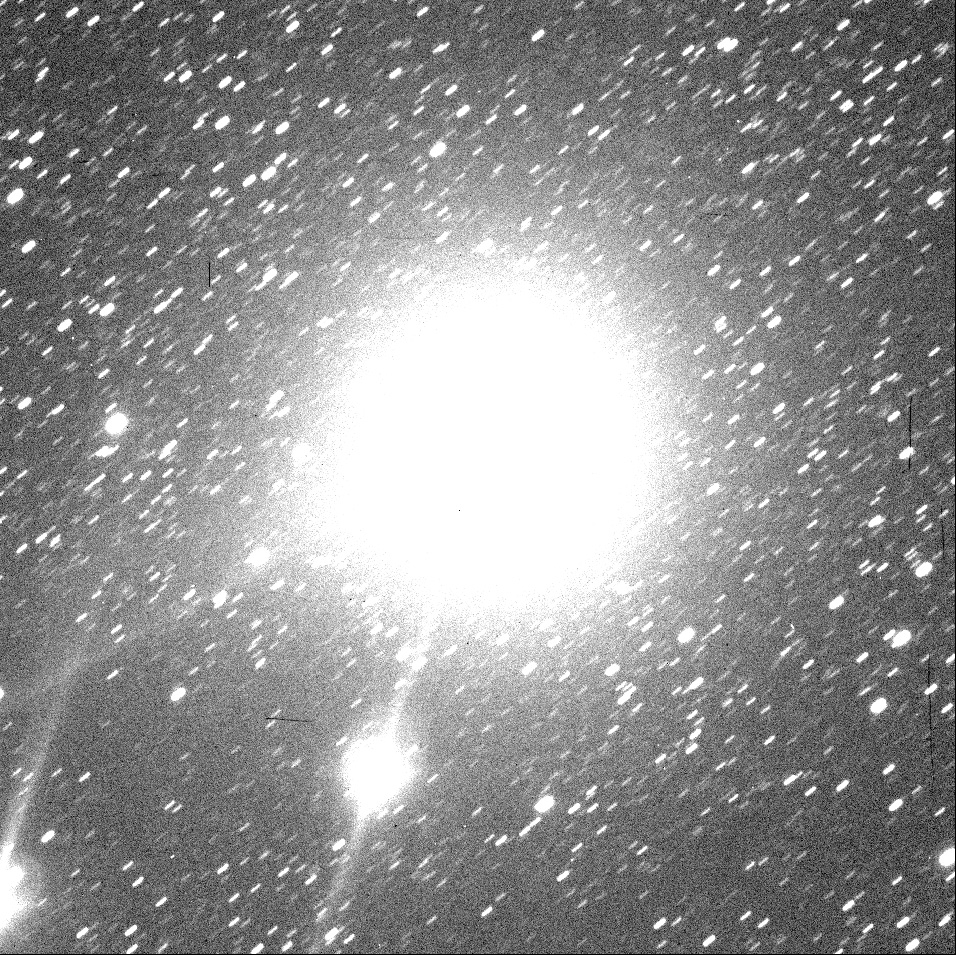
- Comet Williams as imaged by the European Southern Observatory on 11 August 1998

Discovery
- Discovered by: Peter Francis Williams
- Discovery site: Heathcote, Australia
- Discovery date: 10 August 1998

Orbital characteristics
- Epoch: 15 December 1998 (JD 2451162.5)
- Observation arc: 240 days
- Number of observations: 403
- Aphelion: ~3,580 AU
- Perihelion: 1.146 AU
- Semi-major axis: ~1,800 AU
- Eccentricity: 0.99936
- Orbital period: ~75,700 years
- Inclination: 145.73°
- Longitude of ascending node: 156.37°
- Argument of periapsis: 294.45°
- Mean anomaly: 0.001°
- Last perihelion: 17 October 1998
- T_{Jupiter}: –1.406
- Earth MOID: 0.410 AU
- Jupiter MOID: 0.476 AU
- Comet total magnitude (M1): 7.8
- Comet nuclear magnitude (M2): 14.0

Comet Williams, also known as C/1998 P1, is a non-periodic comet that was observed between August 1998 and April 1999. It is the only comet discovered by Australian astronomer Peter F. Williams.

== Observational history ==
While observing the nova EK Trianguli Australis after many days of unfavourable weather, the comet was visually discovered by Peter Francis Williams while using an 0.3 m (12 in) reflector telescope on the night of 10 August 1998. At the time, it was a magnitude-9.5 object within the constellation Circinus. (Note: Reported initial position upon discovery was: α = 15^{h} 10.8^{m} , δ = –64° 59′) Additional observations by Gordon J. Garradd, David A. J. Seargent, Steven Lee, and other astronomers later verified the existence of this comet on two subsequent nights after discovery, albeit at a much fainter magnitude between 13.4 and 16.0. Orbital calculations indicate the object to be a non-periodic comet with a perihelion date of 17 October 1998. By September 1998, an apparent outburst increased its brightness to 7.4.

The comet's brightness remained consistent throughout its outbound trajectory. Alan Hale reported its apparent magnitude of 9.4 in November 1998. The comet slightly brightened back to magnitude 9.0 on December 1998, and magnitude 9.2 on February 1999, respectively.

== Orbit ==
The comet has a retrograde orbit that is inclined by about 145.73° from the ecliptic. It reached perihelion at a distance of 1.146 AU (171.4 million km) on 17 October 1998. A study of the non-gravitational effects on this comet indicate that it was dynamically new, and its apparition in 1998 were likely its first passage through the inner Solar System. Further orbital projections show that this comet may have an 80% probability that it will be ejected from the Solar System on its next few perihelion passages or apparitions.
