= Donald C. Parker =

American physician and astronomer

Donald C. Parker, also known as Don Parker (January 28, 1939 – February 22, 2015), was an American physician and amateur astronomer, specializing in the research of the Solar System and planetary photography. Many of his over 20,000 images of Mars were used by professional astronomers at NASA, Jet Propulsion Laboratory and some observatories and published in numerous books and journals, including Science and Nature. In 2000 he co-authored the book Introduction to Observing and Photographing the Solar System. He is a past director of the Association of Lunar and Planetary Observers.

In 1994 the Mars-crosser asteroid 5392 Parker was named in his honour. One year later his planetary images were acknowledged with the Amateur Achievement Award of the Astronomical Society of the Pacific. In 2004 he received the Gold Medal of the Oriental Astronomical Association for his work on Mars.

== See also ==
- David C. Parker

Preceded by Walter H. Haas	Amateur Achievement Award of Astronomical Society of the Pacific; 1995	Succeeded by Michiel Daniel Overbeek
