= Otto Kippes =

German priest and amateur astronomer (1905–1994)

Otto Kippes (23 July 1905 – 2 February 1994) was a German Catholic priest and amateur astronomer, born in Bamberg, Bavaria. He was acknowledged especially for his work in asteroid orbit calculations, which brought him the Amateur Achievement Award of the Astronomical Society of the Pacific in 1991.

In 1959, the Berlin Academy of Sciences awarded him the Leibniz Medal for his contributions in the identification of minor planets. The main belt asteroid 1780 Kippes was named in his honour. Kippes in turn had successfully proposed to name several asteroids after fellow amateur astronomers. He died on 2 February 1994 in Würzburg, Bavaria.

== See also ==
- List of Roman Catholic scientist-clerics

Preceded by Oscar Monnig	Amateur Achievement Award of Astronomical Society of the Pacific; 1991	Succeeded by Richard D. Lines & Helen Lines
