= Kamil Hornoch =

Czech amateur astronomer

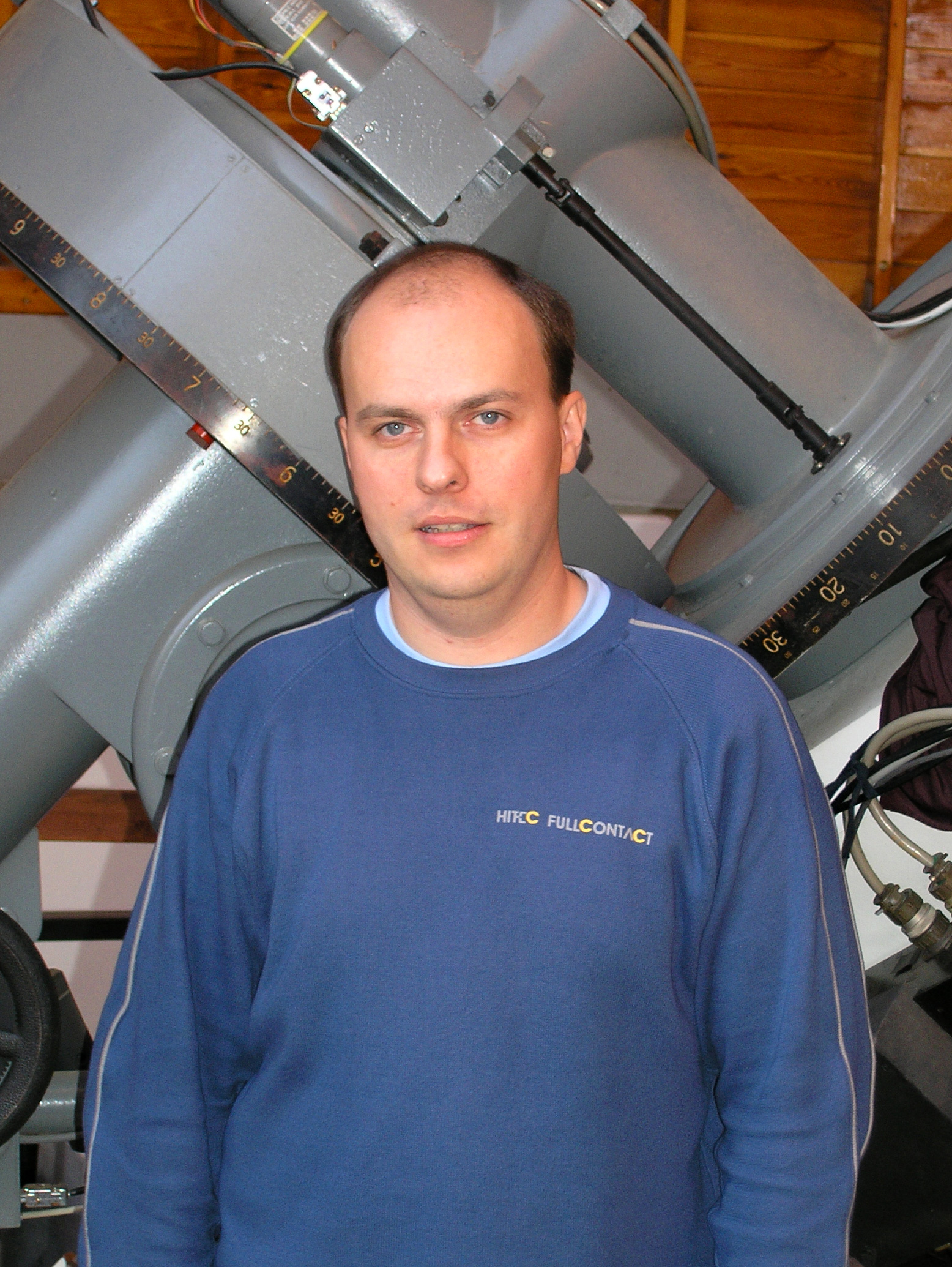
Kamil Hornoch at the Ondřejov Observatory

Kamil Hornoch (Czech pronunciation: [ˈkamɪl ˈɦornox]; born 5 December 1972) is a Czech astronomer who discovered dozens of novae in nearby galaxies. The main belt asteroid 14124 Kamil is named in his honour.

== Astronomy ==
Kamil Hornoch became interested in astronomy in 1984. One year later he started with his scientific observations of comets, meteors, the solar photosphere, variable stars, the planets and occultations. He lives in Lelekovice, a village in the South Moravian Region, the Czech Republic.

Hornoch makes most of his observations from a small observatory in Lelekovice with a 35 cm (14 in) reflector telescope. Although he uses a CCD camera, he is also good in visual estimates of star luminosity, reaching an accuracy of 0.03 magnitude (confirmed by separate photoelectric measurements). He has also been acknowledged for his numerous estimates and measurements of brightness and positions of comets and variable stars, as well as position measurements of minor planets. In 1993 he co-discovered (with Jan Kyselý) new variable star ES UMa.

He is a member of the Czech Astronomical Society. Since 2007 he works as a professional astronomer at the Ondřejov Observatory.

=== Novae ===
In the summer of 2002, Hornoch took a series of pictures of the surrounding of the core of the Andromeda Galaxy and discovered his first extragalactic nova. Since that time, galaxy M31 has become his favourite place to observe; he has made 43 nova discoveries and co-discoveries in that region (as of May 2007). He also discovered two novae in the galaxy M81 in pictures taken by Czech astronomer Pavel Cagaš with his 26.5 cm (10.4 in) reflector telescope on 8 and 11 April 2007. No nova discovery had been made with such a small telescope in such a distance before. One of the novae, M81 2007 3, grew very luminous, reaching the quite extraordinary absolute magnitude of −10 and apparent magnitude of 17.6 six days later. It was the brightest nova ever discovered in M81.

=== Awards ===
- In 1996 Kamil Hornoch became the first person to receive the newly established Zdeněk Kvíz Award of the Czech Astronomical Society for his activities in the field of interplanetary matter.
- In 2001 Lenka Šarounová named the main belt asteroid 14124 Kamil in his honour.
- In 2003 he received the Jindřich Šilhán Award of the Variable Star Observer of the Year (Czech: Cena Jindřicha Šilhána Proměnář roku) of the Czech Astronomical Society.
- In 2006 Kamil Hornoch won the Amateur Achievement Award of the Astronomical Society of the Pacific.

== See also ==
- List of minor planet discoverers § Discovering astronomers

Preceded by Tim Hunter	Amateur Achievement Award of Astronomical Society of the Pacific; 2006	Succeeded by Peter Francis Williams
