= Paul Baize =

French pediatrician and amateur astronomer

Paul Achille‐Ariel Baize
- Born: 11 March 1901; Paris
- Died: 6 October 1995 (aged 94)
- Known for: Amateur astronomer specialising in double star observations

Paul Achille‐Ariel Baize (11 March 1901 – 6 October 1995) was a French pediatrician and amateur astronomer specialising in double star observations.

He started with his observations of double stars in 1925. Between 1933 and 1971 he was allowed to observe from the Paris Observatory. He made 20,044 measures over 47 years. Since 1954 he often published at the International Astronomical Union Commission 26 Information Circular, the last contribution sending in 1993, when he was 92 years old.

In 1989 he received the Amateur Achievement Award of the Astronomical Society of the Pacific. The asteroid 1591 Baize was named in his honour.

== Biography ==
The son of a doctor from Normandy, he attended the Lycée de Coutances before following the same studies as his father and becoming a Pediatrics. He was awarded his doctorate in Medicine in 1931, became head of the clinic in 1932, then hospital assistant in 1934, and pursued his professional career as a teacher at the nursery school, at the hospice for assisted children and in private practice. Professor at the Necker–Enfants Malades Hospital, he publishes numerous medical papers.

He began observing Double star in 1925. Between 1933 and 1971, he was authorized to observe from the Paris Observatory. He made 20,044 measurements over 47 years. In 1946, he publishes with Lucien Romani in Les Annales d'astrophysique. From 1954 onwards, he published regularly in the circulars of Commission No. 26 of the International Astronomical Union; his last contribution was sent in 1993, at the age of 92.

Among other observations, this scientific work made it possible to calculate the mass of stars according to their luminosity, and to verify the universality of Newton's law.

He retired to Gouville-sur-Mer (Manche) in 1971.

Preceded by Jack B. Newton	Amateur Achievement Award of Astronomical Society of the Pacific; 1989	Succeeded by Oscar Monnig
