= Michiel Daniel Overbeek =

South African amateur astronomer

Michiel Daniel Overbeek (15 September 1920 in Ermelo, Mpumalanga, South Africa – 19 July 2001 in Johannesburg), also known as Danie Overbeek, was a South African amateur astronomer and one of the most prolific variable star observers.

== Life ==
He studied in a Mining and Metallurgy program at the University of the Witwatersrand. During the Second World War he served in the South African Air Force and was awarded the Africa Star and mentioned in Dispatches. After the war he worked for South African Airways and South African Railways.

In 1945, he married Jean Mary Preddy, with whom he had four children. She died in 1985.

== Astronomy ==
Daniel Overbeek's serious interest in astronomy dates back to 1951, when he started observing occultations and variable stars. In 1958 he earned a B.Sc. degree in mathematics and astronomy from the University of South Africa. During his lifetime, he contributed 287,240 observations to the American Association of Variable Star Observers (AAVSO) International Database, becoming the most prolific AAVSO contributor.

In 1998, he became the first amateur astronomer who detected supernova related gamma ray burst effects. He also monitored Earth's magnetic field and seismic activity with a magnetometer and a seismograph he had built, and observed sudden ionospheric disturbance.

=== Acknowledgement ===
In 1956, Overbeek became the chairman of the Transvaal Centre of the Astronomical Society of Southern Africa (ASSA). He was elected the president of the ASSA twice: in 1961 and 1999. In 1984, he was awarded the Gill Medal, the highest ASSA honour.

The American Association of Variable Star Observers awarded him with the Merit Award in 1986 and the Director's Award in 1994. He was also a multiple AAVSO Observer awardee: in 1994 for making 100,000 variable star observations, in 1997 for 200,000 and in 1999 for 250,000 observations.

In 1995, he received the Christos Papadopoulos Trophy of the Transvaal Centre of the ASSA. He also won the Amateur Achievement Award of the Astronomical Society of the Pacific in 1996. The Mars-crosser asteroid 5038 Overbeek was named in his honour in 2000.

Preceded by Donald C. Parker	Amateur Achievement Award of Astronomical Society of the Pacific; 1996	Succeeded by Edward A. Halbach
