= Albert F. A. L. Jones =

New Zealand amateur astronomer

Albert Francis Arthur Lofley Jones OBE (9 August 1920 – 11 September 2013) was a New Zealand amateur astronomer, and a prolific variable star and comet observer, a member of the Variable Star Section and the Comet Section of the Royal Astronomical Society of New Zealand.

== Life ==
Albert Jones was born in Christchurch, New Zealand, in 1920 and was educated at Timaru Boys' High School. At the beginning of the Second World War he joined the army, but in 1942 he was classified unfit for overseas service. He worked as a miller in a rolled oats mill, as a grocery shop owner and in a car assembly factory. He died in Nelson, New Zealand, in 2013.

== Astronomy ==
=== Achievements ===
In 1963 he became the sixth astronomer in history to make 100,000 observations of variable stars and by 2004 he became the first to make more than 500,000 observations. His visual brightness estimates were very precise: most observers can distinguish variations of one tenth of a magnitude, but Jones' measurements were reported to show a standard deviation of about one twentieth of a magnitude. In 1946 he discovered the comet C/1946 P1 (Jones) and in 2000 he co-discovered, together with Japanese astronomer Syogo Utsunomiya the comet C/2000 W1 (Utsunomiya-Jones), becoming the oldest comet discoverer. In 1987 he co-discovered the supernova SN 1987A in the Large Magellanic Cloud, which was the brightest naked-eye supernova explosion since 1604.

=== Honours and awards ===
Jones' work was widely acknowledged. In 1968, he received the Merlin Silver Medal and Prize of the British Astronomical Association for his work in establishing accurate magnitudes of comets. In the 1987 Queen's Birthday Honours, he was appointed an Officer of the Order of the British Empire, for services to astronomy. The following year, asteroid 3152 Jones was named after him. He won the Amateur Achievement Award of the Astronomical Society of the Pacific for his variable star and comet observations in 1998. The comet C/2000 W1 discovery brought him the Edgar Wilson Award, administered by the Smithsonian Astrophysical Observatory, in 2001. In 2004 he received an honorary Doctorate of Science from the Victoria University of Wellington.

Awards
Preceded by Edward A. Halbach	Amateur Achievement Award of Astronomical Society of the Pacific; 1998	Succeeded by Warren Offutt
