= C/1962 C1 (Seki–Lines) =

Great Comet of 1962

C/1962 C1 (Seki–Lines) (Great Comet of 1962)
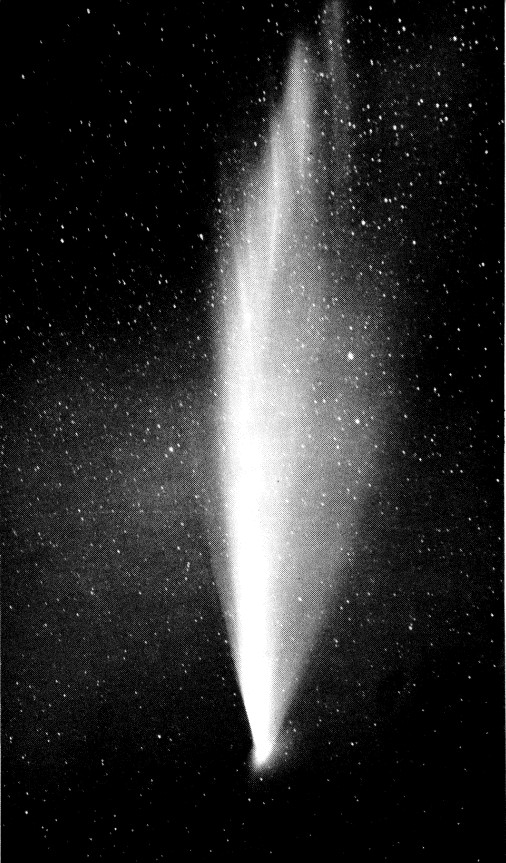
- Comet Seki–Lines photographed by Alan McClure on 10 April 1962

Discovery
- Discovered by: Tsutomu Seki; Richard D. Lines
- Discovery date: 4 February 1962

Designations
- Alternative designations: 1962c 1962 III

Orbital characteristics
- Epoch: 30 May 1962 (JD 2437814.5)
- Observation arc: 349 days
- Number of observations: 32
- Perihelion: 0.031 AU
- Eccentricity: 1.0000045
- Inclination: 65.01°
- Longitude of ascending node: 304.68°
- Argument of periapsis: 11.47°
- Last perihelion: 1 April 1962
- Earth MOID: 0.141 AU
- Jupiter MOID: 0.272 AU

Physical characteristics
- Comet nuclear magnitude (M2): 14.2
- Apparent magnitude: –1.5 (1962 apparition)

C/1962 C1 (Seki–Lines), also known as Comet Seki–Lines and 1962c, was a hyperbolic comet discovered independently by Richard D. Lines and Tsutomu Seki on 4 February 1962. The comet became very bright in April 1962, as passed its perihelion on 1 April at a distance of 0.031 AU (4.6 million km; 2.9 million mi), thus becoming the Great Comet of 1962.

== Observational history ==
The comet was discovered independently by Richard D. Lines and Tsutomu Seki on 4 February 1962. The comet then was located near ζ Puppis and its apparent magnitude was estimated by the Lowell Observatory to be 8 two days later. At the end of February and early March the comet became visible by naked eye, as it crossed the constellations of Eridanus and Cetus. The comet brightened rapidly and by 27 March its magnitude was estimated to be 0 to -1. The comet reached its perihelion on 1 April 1962, at a distance of about 4 million km (0.027 AU) from the Sun, and although it should have been bright enough, no daylight observations were reported.

After perihelion the comet became visible in the northwestern evening twilight on 3 April, with an estimated magnitude of -2.5. The comet had a slightly curved tail whose reported length was 10 to 15 degrees. The tail featured small striae in photographs. The tail also appeared split to in two. The comet faded rapidly during April, as its distance to both the Sun and Earth increased and could no longer be observed by the end of the month. At late May the comet remained low as it moved in conjunction with the Sun. It was last photographed on May 30, with the comet located low in twilight. Its tail was measured to be 2.5 arcminutes in length.

The comet was reobserved photographically on 27 and 28 October 1962 and on 27 November 1962 by the Flagstaff observatory. The comet was last observed on 25 January 1963, as photographic attempts in February failed to locate the comet.

== Scientific results ==
The spectrum of the comet before perihelion was similar to that of comet Mrkos, having similar intensity of diatomic carbon and NH_{2}. Also present were the [O I] and the sodium D-line, which had spatial asymmetry.
