= 39890 Bobstephens =

Main-belt asteroid

Discovery
- Discovered by: P. Pravec
- Discovery site: Ondřejov Obs.
- Discovery date: 23 March 1998

Designations
- Named after: Robert D. Stephens (American astronomer)
- Alternative designations: 1998 FA_{3}
- Minor planet category: main-belt · (middle)

Orbital characteristics
- Epoch 4 September 2017 (JD 2458000.5)
- Uncertainty parameter 0
- Observation arc: 21.25 yr (7,760 days)
- Aphelion: 3.1534 AU
- Perihelion: 2.0287 AU
- Semi-major axis: 2.5910 AU
- Eccentricity: 0.2170
- Orbital period (sidereal): 4.17 yr (1,523 days)
- Mean anomaly: 201.46°
- Mean motion: 0° 14^{m} 10.68^{s} / day
- Inclination: 5.4950°
- Longitude of ascending node: 161.73°
- Argument of perihelion: 95.752°

Physical characteristics
- Dimensions: 2.06 km (calculated)
- Synodic rotation period: 9.55±0.01 h
- Geometric albedo: 0.20 (assumed)
- Spectral type: S
- Absolute magnitude (H): 15.8 · 15.9

39890 Bobstephens (provisional designation 1998 FA_{3}) is a stony asteroid from the middle region of the asteroid belt, approximately 2 kilometers in diameter. The asteroid was discovered on 23 March 1998, by Czech astronomer Petr Pravec at Ondřejov Observatory near Prague in the Czech Republic. It was named for American astronomer Robert Stephens.

== Orbit and classification ==
Bobstephens orbits the Sun in the central main-belt at a distance of 2.0–3.2 AU once every 4 years and 2 months (1,523 days). Its orbit has an eccentricity of 0.22 and an inclination of 5° with respect to the ecliptic. It was first imaged at Steward Observatory in 1995. This precovery extends the body's observation arc by 3 years prior to its official discovery observation.

== Physical characteristics ==
=== Rotation period ===
In August 2008, a rotational lightcurve of Bobstephens was obtained from photometric observations by American amateur astronomer Daniel Coley at the Center for Solar System Studies in California. Light-curve analysis gave a rotation period of 9.55 hours with a brightness variation of 0.20 magnitude (U=2).

=== Diameter and albedo ===
The Collaborative Asteroid Lightcurve Link assumes a standard albedo for stony asteroids of 0.20 and calculates a diameter of 2.06 kilometers with an absolute magnitude of 15.8.

== Naming ==
This minor planet was named for Californian amateur astronomer and photometrist Robert D. Stephens (born 1955), who is an expert in lightcurve photometry of minor planets since 1999. The official naming citation was published by the Minor Planet Center on 24 July 2002 (M.P.C. 46112).
