= Warren B. Offutt =

American amateur astronomer and amateur radio operator

Minor planets discovered: 18
(12438) 1996 CZ	February 9, 1996	list
(23702) 1997 QE_{1}	August 28, 1997	list
(39672) 1996 BF_{1}	January 22, 1996	list
(43997) 1997 QX	August 29, 1997	list
(46695) 1997 CX_{13}	February 4, 1997	list
(58469) 1996 RC	September 7, 1996	list
(58484) 1996 TO_{3}	October 8, 1996	list
(73900) 1997 FD	March 19, 1997	list
(73966) 1997 XG_{10}	December 6, 1997	list
(85473) 1997 LV_{5}	June 12, 1997	list
(85547) 1997 XF_{10}	December 5, 1997	list
(100598) 1997 QO_{1}	August 31, 1997	list
(100695) 1997 YK_{11}	December 28, 1997	list
(118215) 1996 BN_{1}	January 24, 1996	list
(155411) 1996 DG_{3}	February 28, 1996	list
(239810) 1997 EC_{26}	March 11, 1997	list
(382427) 1999 CF_{3}	February 9, 1999	list
(483405) 1999 CP_{2}	February 7, 1999	list

Warren B. Offutt (February 13, 1928 – September 20, 2017) was an American amateur astronomer and amateur radio operator.

Offutt is credited by the Minor Planet Center with the discovery of 17 asteroids and has notably collaborated with professional astronomers in observing Kuiper belt objects (KBOs). In 1999 he won the Amateur Achievement Award of the Astronomical Society of the Pacific.

Offutt and his wife, Beverly (since deceased), moved from Illinois to New Mexico when he retired from engineering, specializing in precision astrometry of faint objects in the Solar System. He operated the W & B Observatory (709) in the U.S. village of Cloudcroft, New Mexico, in the Sacramento Mountains, at an altitude of 2500 m (8300 ft).

In 1997, Offutt helped with three more major discoveries, among them confirmation of a then-newly discovered moon of Uranus, Sycorax.

On 11 February 1998, the outer main-belt asteroid 7639 Offutt was named after him, just before his 70th birthday (M.P.C. 31297).

Preceded by Albert F. A. L. Jones	Amateur Achievement Award of Astronomical Society of the Pacific; 1999	Succeeded by Paul Boltwood
