= Shuichi Nakano =

Japanese astronomer

Syuichi Nakano (中野 主一, Nakano Shuichi; born September 11, 1947) is a Japanese astronomer. He specializes in the study of comets, in particular calculating their orbits and making predictions about when periodic comets will return for another perihelion approach. It is considerably more difficult to predict the orbits of comets than of other types of Solar System objects, since their orbits are susceptible not only to perturbations from the planets but also to non-gravitational forces due to the release of gaseous material in the form of a comet's coma and tail.

He is affiliated with the Computing & Minor Planet Sections (Center for Astrodynamics) of the Oriental Astronomical Association in Sumoto, Japan.

He publishes the Nakano Notes on comet observations and ephemerides.

In 2001 he won the Amateur Achievement Award of the Astronomical Society of the Pacific. The asteroid 3431 Nakano is named after him, and asteroid 3983 Sakiko is named after his sister.

1026 Ingrid was reidentified in 1986 by Syuichi Nakano, ending its time as a lost asteroid. 3568 ASCII is another long-lost asteroid whose recovery was made by Nakano.

| Preceded by Paul Boltwood | Amateur Achievement Award of Astronomical Society of the Pacific; 2001 | Succeeded by Kyle E. Smalley |
