= Peter Francis Williams =

Australian astronomer

Peter Francis Williams was an amateur astronomer from New South Wales, Australia. Born in Sydney in 1955, he specialized in early detection of declines in R Coronae Borealis-type stars and the long-term monitoring of several southern Mira variables and eclipsing binary stars, and was considered to be one of the pre-eminent southern hemisphere variable star observers. Peter was awarded The Berenice Page Medal in 1996 for his extensive visual observations of variable stars, especially the R Coronae Borealis variables. In the 54 years that he spent making variable star observations, he was just the 12th astronomer to pass the 200,000 observation milestone, doing so on 4 July 2021.

In 1998, he discovered a comet now known as C/1998 P1, officially lodging the discovery shortly before New Zealand astronomer Alan Gilmore did so. For this discovery, Peter was awarded the Edgar Wilson Award in 1999.

He was the first person to detect the naked-eye Nova known as V382 Velorum in 1999 and seven years later he discovered the Nova Ophiuchi 2006. Both discoveries brought him the Nova/Supernova Award of the American Association of Variable Star Observers. In 2007 he received the Amateur Achievement Award of the Astronomical Society of the Pacific. He was a life member of the Sutherland Astronomical Society.

Peter was an avid photographer, making significant contributions to online forums including Places of Pride and Marine Traffic.

Peter died on 3 March 2026, after a short fight with melanoma.

| Preceded by Kamil Hornoch | Amateur Achievement Award of Astronomical Society of the Pacific; 2007 | Succeeded by Steve Mandel |
