= Helen Lines =

American astronomer

Helen Chambliss Williams Lines (July 13, 1918 – January 29, 2001) was an American amateur astronomer. In her beginnings she was a deep-sky observer and astrophotographer.

== Astronomy ==
In 1969, Lines was one of early members of the Phoenix Astronomical Society. Lines was a member of the American Association of Variable Star Observers. She and her husband, civil engineer Richard D. Lines, built a small observatory in Mayer, Arizona, and wrote about its construction for Sky & Telescope. In 1992 they won the Amateur Achievement Award of the Astronomical Society of the Pacific for their work in the field of photoelectric photometry of variable stars. She was a co-author on two scientific papers published in the mid-1990s.

== Publications ==
- "A New Amateur Observatory in Central Arizona" (1968, with Richard D. Lines)
- "UBVRI photometry of the recurrent nova T coronae borealis" (1988, with Richard D. Lines and Thomas G. McFaul)
- "Evolution of starspots in the long-period RS CVN binary V1817 Cygni = HR 7428" (1990, with Richard D. Lines, Douglas S. Hall, and Susan E. Gessner)
- "The Two Variables in The Triple System HR 6469=V819 Her: One Eclipsing, One Spotted" (1994, with 16 other authors)
- "Starspots Found on the Ellipsoidal Variable V350 Lacertae = HR 8575" (1995, with 5 other authors)

== Personal life ==
Helen Chambliss Williams was born in Forrest City, Arkansas, the daughter of Russell Williams and Sadie Borden Williams. Her father was the chief of police in Forrest City. She married Richard Damon Lines in 1936. They had a daughter, Chambliss. Richard Lines died in 1992, and Helen Lines died in 2001, aged 82 years, in Searcy, Arkansas.

Preceded by Otto Kippes	Amateur Achievement Award of Astronomical Society of the Pacific (together with Richard D. Lines); 1992	Succeeded by David H. Levy
