= Frank Bateson =

New Zealand astronomer

Frank Bateson OBE
- Born: 31 October 1909; Wellington, New Zealand
- Died: 16 April 2007 (aged 97); Tauranga, New Zealand
- Known for: Variable Star Section, Royal Astronomical Society of New Zealand
- Scientific career
- Fields: Astronomy

Frank Maine Bateson OBE (31 October 1909 – 16 April 2007) was a New Zealand astronomer who specialised in the study of variable stars.

== Biography ==
Bateson was born in Wellington on 31 October 1909 and studied in Australia and New Zealand. His interest in astronomy developed during his school years in Sydney, Australia when he read Robert Stawell Ball's Great Astronomers. In 1927, at the age of 18, he founded the Variable Star Section (VSS) of the Royal Astronomical Society of New Zealand. He remained as director of the VSS until 2004.

Under his lead, the VSS observed variable stars and collated reports on stars from both professional and amateur observers throughout the world and was known worldwide for its work in the field of variable stars. He was associated with the VSS until his death. He and his wife, Doris, formed a non-profit organisation called Astronomical Research Ltd, which administers the over 1,000,000 observations which have been delivered to the VSS by amateur and professional astronomers worldwide since the onset of the programme.

He served in World War II with New Zealand's Home Naval Service, then after the war moved to Rarotonga, Cook Islands where he worked until 1960. In 1958 he was elected to the Parliament of the Cook Islands. He spent much of his career working in the business field while pursuing his astronomical interests as a hobby.

Bateson was instrumental in the founding of the Mount John University Observatory near Lake Tekapo, assisting the University of Canterbury in finding an appropriate location for the observatory. Bateson was appointed astronomer-in-charge of the observatory after it opened in 1963; he held this position until his retirement in 1969.

Bateson also authored or co-authored over 300 scientific papers. He was elected as a Fellow of the Royal Astronomical Society of New Zealand (RASNZ) in 1963. He served on the society's council for a number of years, including one year as president. He was an honorary member of the Royal Astronomical Society and the Royal Astronomical Society of Canada. Bateson was also a member of the International Astronomical Union and served as its first representative from New Zealand. He received the Jackson-Gwilt Medal of the Royal Astronomical Society in 1960 and an honorary doctorate from the University of Waikato in 1979. He was appointed an Officer of the Order of the British Empire in the 1970 New Year Honours for services to astronomy, and the Amateur Achievement Award of the Astronomical Society of the Pacific in 1980. The asteroid 2434 Bateson was named in his honour.

Bateson died at the age of 97 on 16 April 2007, in Tauranga, New Zealand.

Awards
Preceded by James McMahon	Amateur Achievement Award of Astronomical Society of the Pacific; 1980	Succeeded by George Alcock
