= Steve Mandel =

American communications coach, photographer and astronomer

Steve Mandel is an amateur astronomer and astrophotographer. He owns a small observatory, called Hidden Valley Observatory, in Soquel, California. He has been acknowledged especially for his wide-field photographs of the Milky Way nebulae and for public outreach, for which he has received Amateur Achievement Award of the Astronomical Society of the Pacific. Besides this he has also captured and published wildlife images of endangered animals. He works as an American communications coach for professional executives, and is the founder of the Mandel Communications Inc., which aims to teach effective communication and public speaking.

== Astrophotography ==
Steve Mandel's interest in astronomy began when he was 11 years old. He built his first telescope, a 6" reflector, at his home in Los Angeles. His interest in astrophotography grew in the 1970s and 1980s and been worked as a photographic stringer for Newsweek magazine. Later, his wide-field images became recognized by professional astronomers. In 2005, he took pictures of high latitude areas of the sky and experimented with different wavelengths using various photographic filters and managed to take pictures of very faint unexplored nebulae above the plane of the Milky Way. The pictures were investigated by Adolf Witt, an astronomer of the University of Toledo in Ohio, who found out that the nebulae surprisingly contained carbon. Subsequently, his images became a subject of several scientific papers. These interstellar structures, labelled by Mandel as the integrated flux nebulae, are illuminated by the light from the entire galaxy, which distinguishes them from the typical reflection nebulae, illuminated by a nearby star. In 2004 Mandel started to work on the Mandel-Wilson Unexplored Nebulae Project aimed at their discovering, cataloguing and photographing.

== Public outreach ==
In 1984 Steve Mandel published his portrait of the constellation Cygnus in Sky and Telescope magazine, and since that time his pictures have been introduced in various other periodicals, including the NASA web page Astronomy Picture of the Day. In 2006 he published some of his astronomy photographs in his book Light in the Sky: Photographs of the Universe.

Steve Mandel has also cooperated with the Kitt Peak National Observatory Visitor Center, presenting educational Nightly Observer Program and Advanced Observer Program to the public. In 2004 he founded the Advanced Imaging Conference in San Jose, California, where about 250 amateur astronomers and manufacturers of astronomical equipment and software meet annually to discuss technology, imaging techniques and possibilities of scientific contributions. He created the so-called Hubble Award, given at the conference to an astronomer who made significant contributions to astrophotography.

== Wildlife ==
Besides astrophotography Steve Mandel has captured and published also images of endangered animals. He specializes in using robotic devices to gain artistic wildlife photographs from unusual angles.

== Acknowledgement ==
Steve Mandel received two awards for his contributions to astronomy, both in 2008. The Astronomical Society of the Pacific awarded him with their international Amateur Achievement Award, especially for his CCD imaging achievements and public outreach. The American Astronomical Society awarded him with the Chambliss Amateur Achievement Medal, annually given to North-American amateur astronomers, again for his contributions to wide-field imaging.

Preceded by Peter Francis Williams	Amateur Achievement Award of the Astronomical Society of the Pacific; 2008	Succeeded by Thomas Droege
