= Tim Hunter (astronomer) =

American radiologist and amateur astronomer

Tim B. Hunter is an American radiologist, medical educator and amateur astronomer. He is professor emeritus of radiology and imaging sciences at the University of Arizona College of Medicine – Tucson. He served as chair of the university's Department of Radiology and Imaging Sciences from 2008 to 2011. He is also known for his work in light pollution advocacy and as a co-founder of the International Dark-Sky Association (now DarkSky International).

== Biography ==
Hunter was born in Baltimore, Maryland, in 1943. He attended Arlington High School in Arlington Heights, Illinois, where he was valedictorian. He studied at DePauw University, receiving a Bachelor of Arts degree in 1966, and earned his Doctor of Medicine degree from Northwestern University Feinberg School of Medicine in 1968. He later studied mathematics at the University of Arizona, receiving a Bachelor of Science degree in 1980, and completed a Master of Science degree in astronomy at Swinburne University of Technology in Melbourne, Australia, in 2006.

== Medical career ==
Hunter completed postgraduate training in diagnostic radiology at the University of Michigan, Ann Arbor, and joined the faculty of the University of Arizona College of Medicine in 1975. He specialized in diagnostic and musculoskeletal imaging and subsequently held a series of academic and clinical leadership positions within the university's Department of Radiology. He became an associate professor in 1981 and a professor in 1987.

Hunter served as director of the Division of Abdominal Imaging and held leadership positions in diagnostic radiology and gastrointestinal radiology at the University Medical Center in Tucson. He was chair of the Department of Radiology and Imaging Sciences from 2008 to 2011. He retired from the University of Arizona in 2014 and subsequently held emeritus status.

He has published and edited works in radiology, including books and reference material concerning medical imaging and radiologic diagnosis. His publications have included work on musculoskeletal imaging, breast imaging, medical devices and diagnostic imaging.

Hunter also served on the Arizona Medical Board from 1997 to 2006.

== Military service ==
Hunter served in the United States Navy Medical Corps from 1969 to 1971. During his service, he was assigned to medical units associated with the United States Marine Corps, including service in the Vietnam War. His military service preceded his appointment to the University of Arizona faculty.

== Astronomy and dark-sky advocacy ==
Hunter has been an amateur astronomer since childhood and became increasingly involved in efforts to address the effects of artificial lighting on astronomical observation. In 1987, he and astronomer David Crawford co-founded the International Dark-Sky Association (IDA), a nonprofit organization established to promote responsible outdoor lighting and reduce light pollution. The organization is now known as DarkSky International.

Hunter subsequently served as president of the IDA and became involved in public education concerning outdoor lighting and the preservation of dark skies. His work with the organization contributed to broader public awareness of light pollution as an environmental and astronomical issue.

He has been a member of the Tucson Amateur Astronomy Association since 1975 and has served as its president. He has also served as chair of the Board of Trustees of the Planetary Science Institute.

== Astronomy writing and observatories ==
Hunter has written the weekly Sky Spy astronomy column for the Arizona Daily Star since 2007. The column covers observational astronomy and provides guidance for amateur observers. He later compiled material from the column into the book The Sky at Night: Easy Enjoyment from Your Backyard, published by the University of Arizona Press, Retrieved 6 September 2026.

Hunter operates the 3towers Observatory in Tucson and the Grasslands Observatory near Sonoita, Arizona. His astronomical interests include astrophotography and the study and imaging of dark nebulae. He has also worked on a project to photograph the Barnard objects, a catalogue of dark nebulae compiled by astronomer E. E. Barnard. The project resulted in the book The Barnard Objects: Then and Now, published by Springer Nature in 2023. A follow-up complementary book The Barnard Album was published by Springer Nature in 2026.

== Recognition ==
Hunter's work in astronomy and dark-sky advocacy has received several awards. He received the Astronomical League's Presidential Award in 2004 and the Astronomical Society of the Pacific's Amateur Achievement Award in 2005 for his work concerning light pollution."Tim Hunter". Retrieved 6 September 2026"Gordon Myers Amateur Achievement Award: Past recipients". Retrieved 6 September 2026

The minor planet 6398 Timhunter, discovered at Palomar Observatory in 1991, was named in his honor. The official naming citation recognized his work in raising awareness of light pollution and his role in founding the International Dark-Sky Association.

Preceded by Nik Szymanek	Amateur Achievement Award of Astronomical Society of the Pacific; 2005	Succeeded by Kamil Hornoch
