= C/2000 W1 (Utsunomiya–Jones) =

Non-periodic comet

Discovery
- Discovered by: Syogo Utsunomiya; Albert F. A. L. Jones
- Discovery site: Aso, Kumamoto, Japan; MJUO, New Zealand
- Discovery date: 18 November 2000

Orbital characteristics
- Epoch: 11 December 2000 (JD 2451889.5)
- Observation arc: 58 days
- Number of observations: 440
- Aphelion: ~70,000 AU (inbound); ~1,670 AU (outbound)
- Perihelion: 0.321 AU
- Semi-major axis: ~35,000 AU (inbound); ~835 AU (outbound)
- Eccentricity: 0.9999996
- Orbital period: millions of years (inbound); ~24,000 years (outbound)
- Max. orbital speed: 74.3 km/s (166,000 mph)
- Inclination: 160.16°
- Longitude of ascending node: 10.766°
- Argument of periapsis: 51.509°
- Last perihelion: 26 December 2000
- Next perihelion: Disintegrated
- T_{Jupiter}: –0.661
- Earth MOID: 0.101 AU
- Jupiter MOID: 0.838 AU

Physical characteristics
- Comet total magnitude (M1): 12.6
- Comet nuclear magnitude (M2): 20.5
- Apparent magnitude: 5.5 (2000 apparition)

C/2000 W1 (Utsunomiya–Jones) is a non-periodic comet from the Oort cloud discovered on 18 November 2000, by Syogo Utsunomiya and Albert F. A. L. Jones. The comet reached up to apparent magnitude 5.5, but was only 27 degrees from the Sun in mid-December 2000.

== Orbit ==
The comet has an observation arc of 58 days allowing a reasonable estimate of the orbit. Though the near-perihelion orbit solution shows the comet to be on a hyperbolic trajectory, the orbit of a long-period comet is properly obtained when the osculating orbit is computed at an epoch after leaving the planetary region and is calculated with respect to the center of mass of the Solar System. Using JPL Horizons, the barycentric orbital elements for epoch 2020-Jan-01 generate a semi-major axis of 835 AU (124,900 million km), an aphelion distance of 1,670 AU (250,000 million km), and a period of approximately 24,000 years.

C/2000 W1 came to perihelion on 26 December 2000 when it passed 0.321 AU (48.0 million km) from the Sun. It was last observed in February–March 2001 when it faded suddenly and probably disintegrated.
