= Integrated Flux Nebula =

Extra-planar nebulae

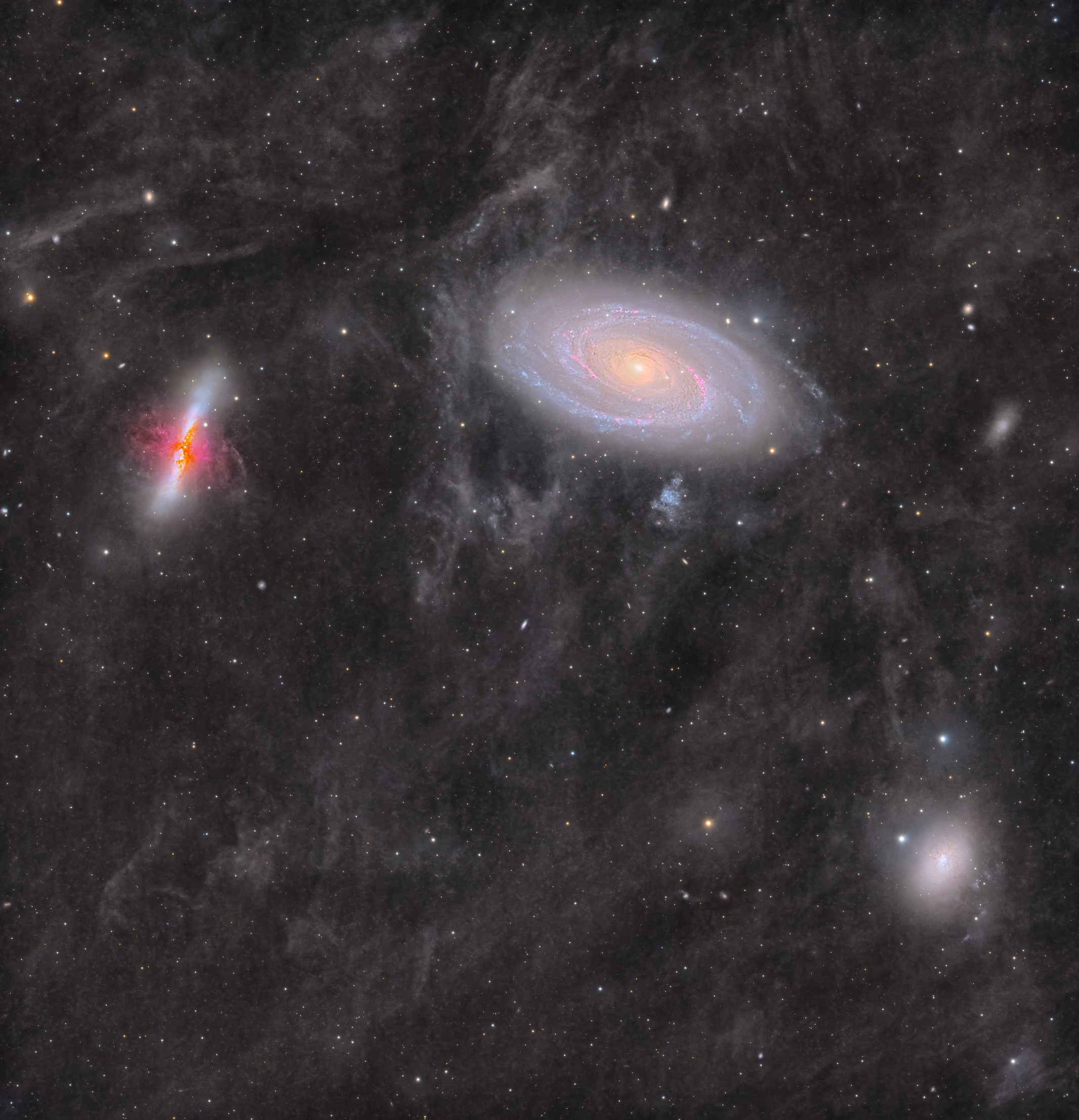
M81 (upper right), M82 (left), and NGC 3077 (bottom right) with a large complex of IFN

Integrated Flux Nebulae (IFN) are a relatively recently (2004) identified astronomical phenomenon. In contrast to the typical and well-known gaseous nebulae within the plane of the Milky Way galaxy, IFNs lie beyond the main body of the galaxy.

The term was coined by Steve Mandel, who defined them as "high galactic latitude nebulae that are illuminated not by a single star (as most nebulae in the plane of the galaxy are) but by the energy from the integrated flux of all the stars in the Milky Way. As a result, these nebulae are incredibly faint, taking hours of exposure to capture. These nebulae clouds, an important component of the interstellar medium, are composed of dust particles, hydrogen, carbon monoxide, and some other elements." They are particularly prominent in the direction of both the north and south celestial poles. The vast nebula close to the south celestial pole is MW9, commonly known as the South Celestial Serpent.

== History ==
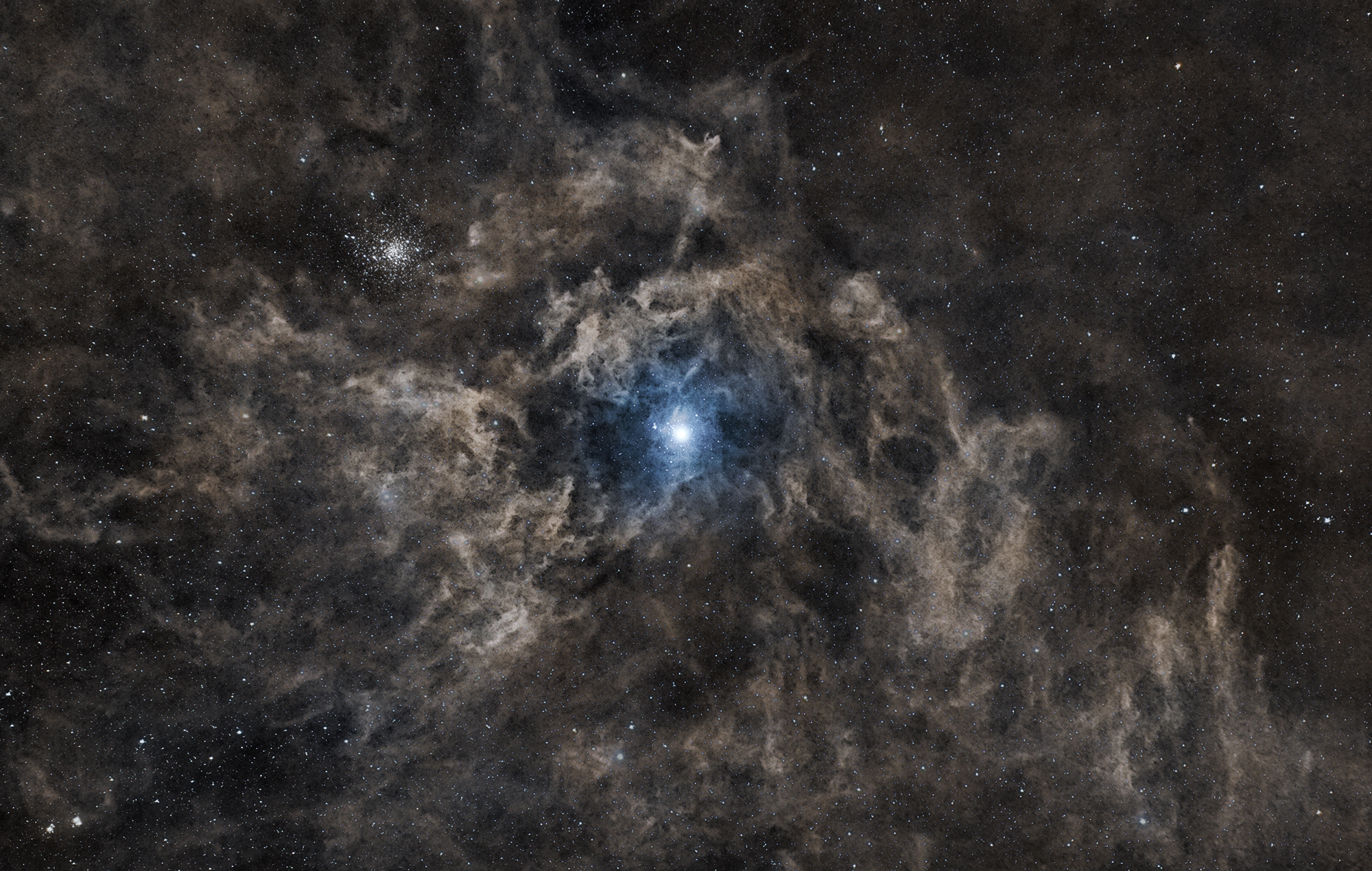
An example of faint integrated flux nebula surrounding the star Polaris

Integrated flux nebulae were initially seen on photographic plates from the Palomar Sky Survey, nebulae appeared on 30 of the 600 plates taken. These were catalogued by B.T. Lynds and then described by Allan Sandage. Sandage and others took note of the dust characteristics but weren't aware of the Extended Red Emission generated by some of the dust particles.

In the 1990s, two far infrared satellites named IRAS and DIRBE were used to create a full all-sky dust map that showed the full extent of the dust.

While imaging M81 and M82 in December 2004, Steve Mandel spotted a large nebula complex surrounding both of the galaxies. After consulting with radio and optical astronomers, Steve Mandel was able to confirm that he had come across a huge dust complex that wasn't very well known. This led to him creating a catalogue of integrated flux nebulae in a project called the "Unexplored Nebula Project.", So far, there are 9 total catalogued Mandel-Wilson objects.

== See also ==
- Infrared cirrus
