= Ronald Alexander McIntosh =

New Zealand journalist and astronomer (1904–1977)

- Born: 21 January 1904; Auckland, New Zealand
- Died: 17 May 1977; Auckland, New Zealand
- Occupation: Journalist
- Known for: Contributions to astronomy

Ronald Alexander McIntosh (21 January 1904 – 17 May 1977) was a New Zealand journalist who was most famous for his contributions to astronomy.

== Life ==
He was born in Auckland, New Zealand on 21 January 1904 and left school at the age of 14. In 1926 he began a long career in journalism when he started work at The New Zealand Herald as a proofreader. He married Harriet Munro in 1930. After World War II service in New Zealand in military intelligence he re-joined The New Zealand Herald, becoming a sub-editor in 1945 before leaving the following year. After spending some years working on aviation magazines and in public relations McIntosh returned to the Herald in 1957 as a senior sub-editor. Ronald McIntosh died in Auckland in 1977 and was survived by his wife, son, daughter and sister.

== Astronomical Work ==
His interest in astronomy was kindled by the 1910 appearance of Halley's Comet, and at age 13 he made his first binocular observations of the Moon. From 1919 to 1950 he collaborated with a number of other New Zealand amateurs in naked-eye observations of meteors. The group recorded 15,627 meteors between 1927 and 1945, with McIntosh contributing about half. He drew on these observations when he published a number of research papers on meteors. One of his most important papers was An Index to Southern Meteor Showers. Published in 1935, it remained the standard work for more than 40 years.

In 1927 he purchased a 14-inch Newtonian telescope which was used for lunar and planetary studies. Over a 30-year period he studied various lunar features and published papers based on his observations. He studied the crater Aristarchus for a long period, beginning in the early 1950s. His main planetary focus was Jupiter and he made many observations from 1927 to the 1960s. He also observed Saturn and Mars as well as Comets.

McIntosh was also interested in the history of science, and published papers on the history of astronomy in New Zealand. One of McIntosh's most important contributions to New Zealand astronomy was his role in establishing the Auckland Observatory which opened in 1967. He began formulating plans for this new public facility in 1953, and did a large share of the fund-raising. He helped secure the One Tree Hill site and served on the observatory's trust board for many years. He devoted a lot of his time to popularising astronomy through lectures, planetarium sessions and newspaper articles. He was a long-time member of the New Zealand Astronomical Society (later the Royal Astronomical Society of New Zealand), the Auckland Astronomical Society, the American Meteor Society and the Royal Astronomical Society.

== Recognition ==
His work was frequently acknowledged by Charles Pollard Olivier of the American Meteor Society and he was elected to the International Astronomical Union's Commission 22 on Meteors. He was twice awarded the Donovan Medal by the Astronomical Society of Australia.
