= Night Sky Network =

American network of amateur astronomy groups

Night Sky Network is an educational effort sponsored by NASA to help educate the public through astronomy clubs across the United States, as part of NASA's Science Activation program.

== See also ==
- List of astronomical societies
