= David Crawford (astronomer) =

American astronomer (1931–2024)

David Livingstone Crawford (1931 – July 22, 2024) was an American astronomer.

Crawford had a doctorate in astronomy from the University of Chicago and worked most of his scientific career at Kitt Peak National Observatory in Tucson, Arizona, and the National Optical Astronomical Observatories, where he was emeritus astronomer. He co-founded the International Dark-Sky Association with Tim Hunter in 1988. He won the 2010 Clifford W. Holmes Award for popularizing astronomy. Due to his life-long efforts advocating for dark skies and against light pollution he is regarded as one of the greatest environmentalists of the late 20th and early 21st centuries. In August of 2021, Crawford was awarded the IES Medal Award in recognition of his contributions to the Illuminating Engineering Society.

Asteroid (7327) Crawford is named after him.

Crawford died on July 22, 2024, at the age of 93.

== Sources ==
- Dr. David L. Crawford, 2005 G. Bruce Blair Award, Western Amateur Astronomers
