= Royal Astronomical Society of New Zealand =

New Zealand national astronomical society

The Royal Astronomical Society of New Zealand (RASNZ) is the New Zealand national astronomical society. It is an association of professional and amateur astronomers with the prime objective of the "promotion and extension of knowledge of astronomy and related branches of science".

== History ==
The society was founded in 1920 as the New Zealand Astronomical Society. In 1946, the society received its Royal Charter and became the Royal Astronomical Society of New Zealand.

In 1967, the RASNZ became a member body of the Royal Society of New Zealand.

== Membership ==
Membership of the society is open to anyone interested in astronomy, including affiliated societies such as the Southland Astronomical Society. Currently (2019) the society has around 230 members consisting of professional, student and amateur astronomers. 19 societies are affiliated (2019) with RASNZ and there are two corporate members (2019).

Current and past members of note include:

- Alan C. Gilmore
- Albert F. A. L. Jones
- Charles Gifford
- Frank Bateson
- Leslie Comrie
- Pamela M. Kilmartin
- Ronald Alexander McIntosh
- Norman Rumsey
- Duncan Sommerville

== Activities ==
RASNZ coordinates a number of sections (groups of people who share a common interest) including the Occultation, Education and Variable Star sections.

The RASNZ holds an annual conference, generally hosted by one of the affiliated societies. The conference is open to non-members. A wide range of papers are presented during the conference and often symposiums related to the RASNZ's sections are held in conjunction with the conference. The SWAPA scheme (Students With A Passion for Astronomy) pays the costs of attending the Conference for ten school students.

The Gifford-Eiby Lecture fund exists to provide funds to sponsor the visits to Affiliated Societies and RASNZ members of lecturers or instructors in astronomy to regions throughout New Zealand.

The Kingdon-Tomlinson Fund is used to provide grants to promote the study of astronomy in New Zealand.

The Murray Geddes Prize is generally awarded annually in recognition of contributions to astronomy in New Zealand.

RASNZ publishes a quarterly journal (Southern Stars). The Astronomical Yearbook produced by the Auckland Observatory is also provided to members.

== See also ==
- List of astronomical societies
- Dark sky movement in New Zealand
