= Ann E. Wehrle =

American astronomer

- Born: 1956 (age 69–70)
- Education: Bryn Mawr (A.B.) (1978); UCLA (M.S.) (1982); UCLA (Ph.D.) (1987)
- Scientific career
- Fields: Astronomy
- Workplaces: Space Science Institute; Jet Propulsion Laboratory; California Institute of Technology
- Thesis: The radio structure of active nuclei in "edge-on" spiral and Seyfert galaxies (1987)

Ann E. Wehrle is an astronomer currently studying black holes and quasars at the Space Science Institute in Boulder, CO. More specifically, she studies energy emission mechanisms from relativistic jets near black holes in quasars and active galactic nuclei. Ann lives in La Canada Flintridge, CA with her husband and their two children. Ann says that she is fascinated by black holes because they embody the most extreme conditions in the known universe.

Throughout her school career, math and physics were always Wehrle's favorite subjects. At 17, Ann met Alma Zook, a professor of astronomy at Pomona College. Because there were very few girls in math and science at the time, meeting Zook was very influential for Wehrle. As of 2016, Zook and Wehrle have collaborated on 13 different publications.

== Career ==
Wehrle is currently a senior research scientist at the Space Science Institute in Boulder, CO, a position she has held since 2006. Prior to this appointment, she was a research scientist at the California Institute of Technology (Caltech) and NASA Jet Propulsion Laboratory (JPL). As of 2016, she has been either an author or a co-author of over 126 publications. In 2000, NASA appointed Wehrle to the Science Team of the Space Interferometry Mission, since renamed SIM PlanetQuest, as a principal investigator for one of the mission's 10 key science projects. She was the only woman to be appointed principal investigator.
