= Nik Szymanek =

British astronomer

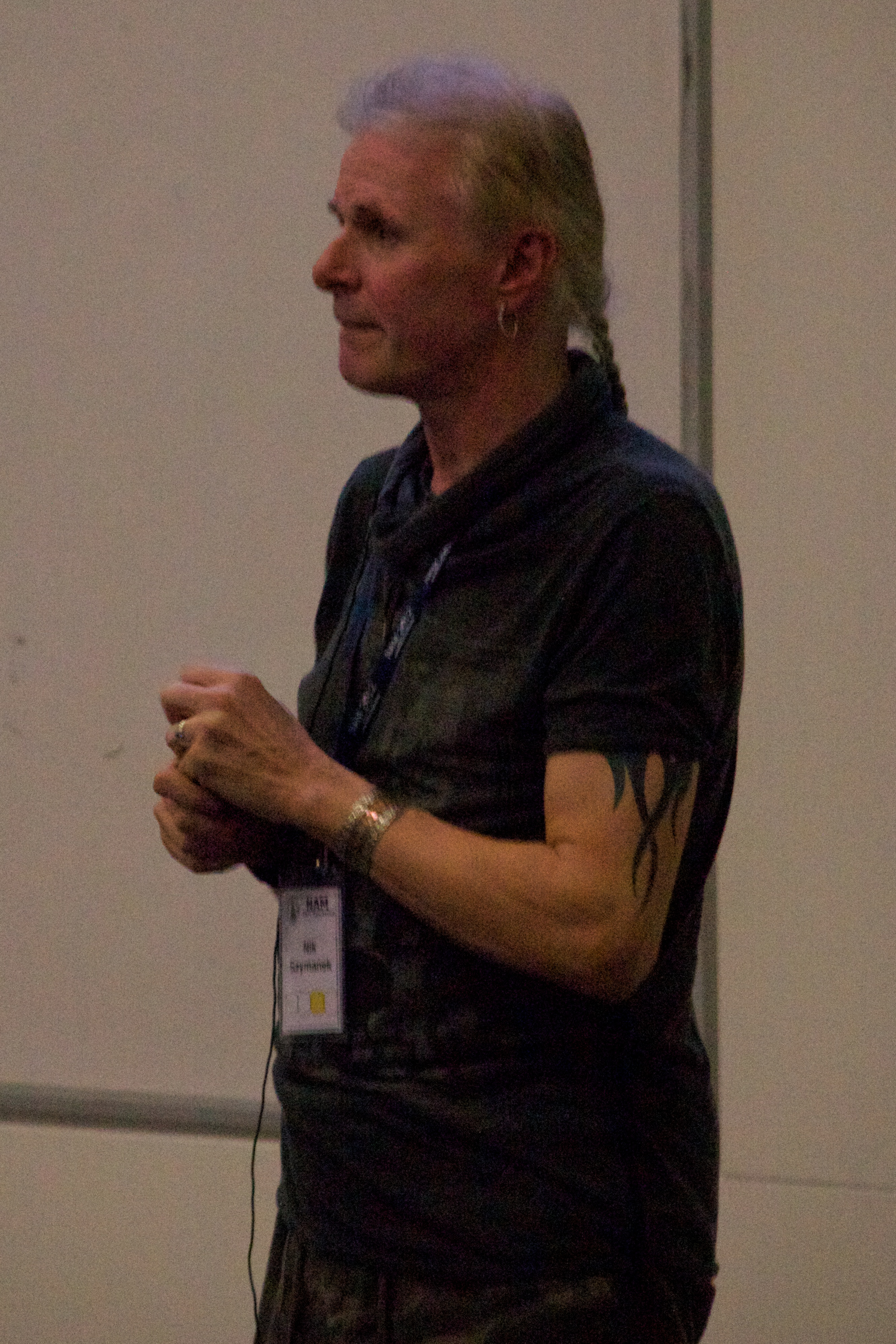
- Nik Szymanek presenting at the National Astronomy Meeting 2012
- Known for: astrophotography, CCD imaging

Nicholas Szymanek, better known as Nik Szymanek, is a British amateur astronomer and prolific astrophotographer, based in Essex, England.

Originally a train driver in the London Underground, he began his interest in astronomical CCD imaging shortly before 1991. His interest in this kind of observational astronomy rose in 1991, after he met Ian King, another amateur astronomer and a fellow from the local Havering Astronomical Society.

Szymanek is most known for his deep sky CCD images, and his contributions to education and public outreach surrounding amateur astronomy. He collaborates with professional astronomers and works with research-grade telescopes located at La Palma in the Canary Islands, and at Mauna Kea Observatories at the Hawaiian Islands. He publishes his pictures in astronomical magazines and has written a book on astrophotography called Infinity Rising.

Due to his imaging and image-processing accomplishments, Szymanek was awarded the Amateur Achievement Award of the Astronomical Society of the Pacific in 2004.

Szymanek is also the drummer for UK Neo-Progressive band Trilogy.

== Gallery ==
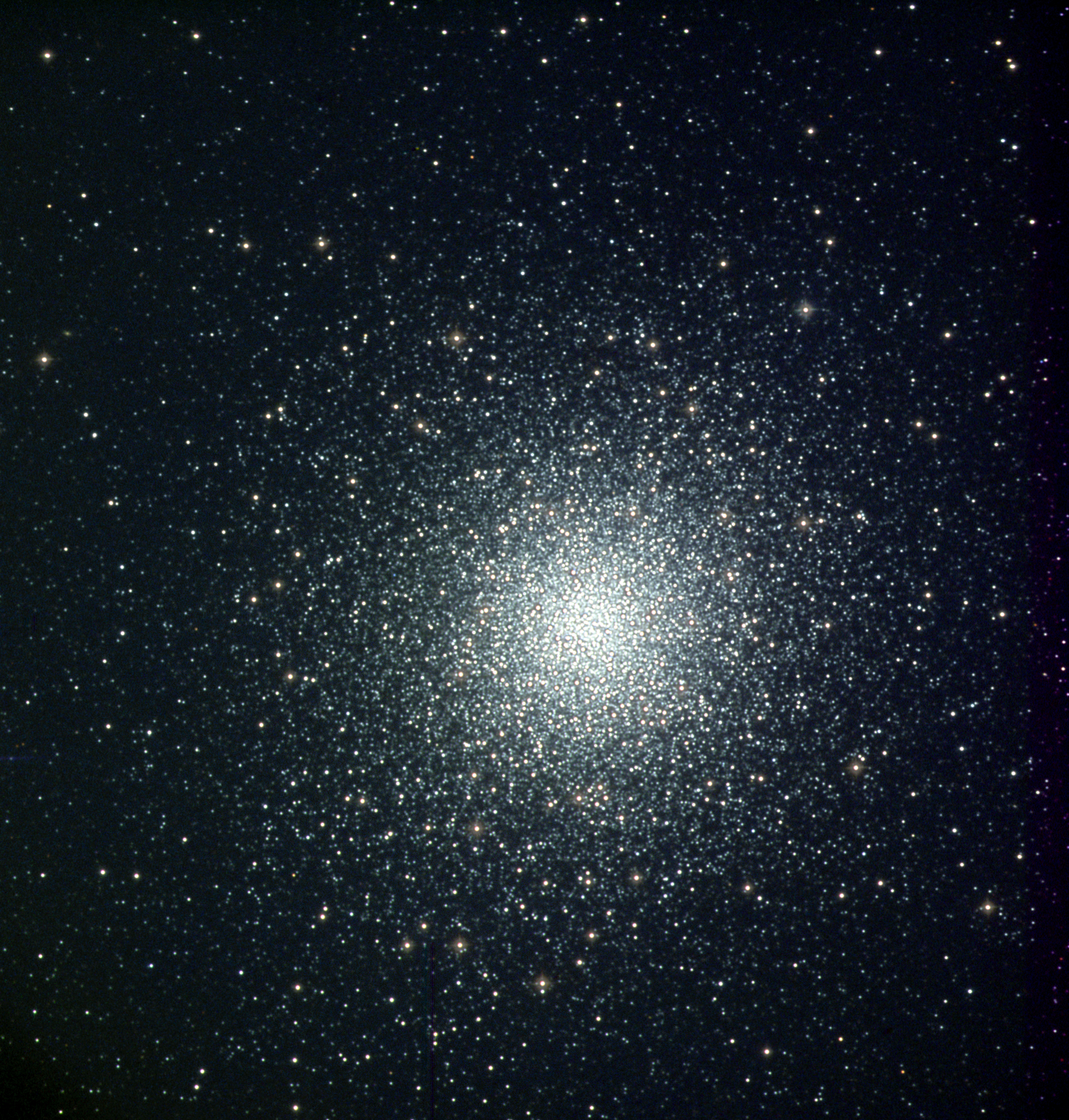
Messier 92

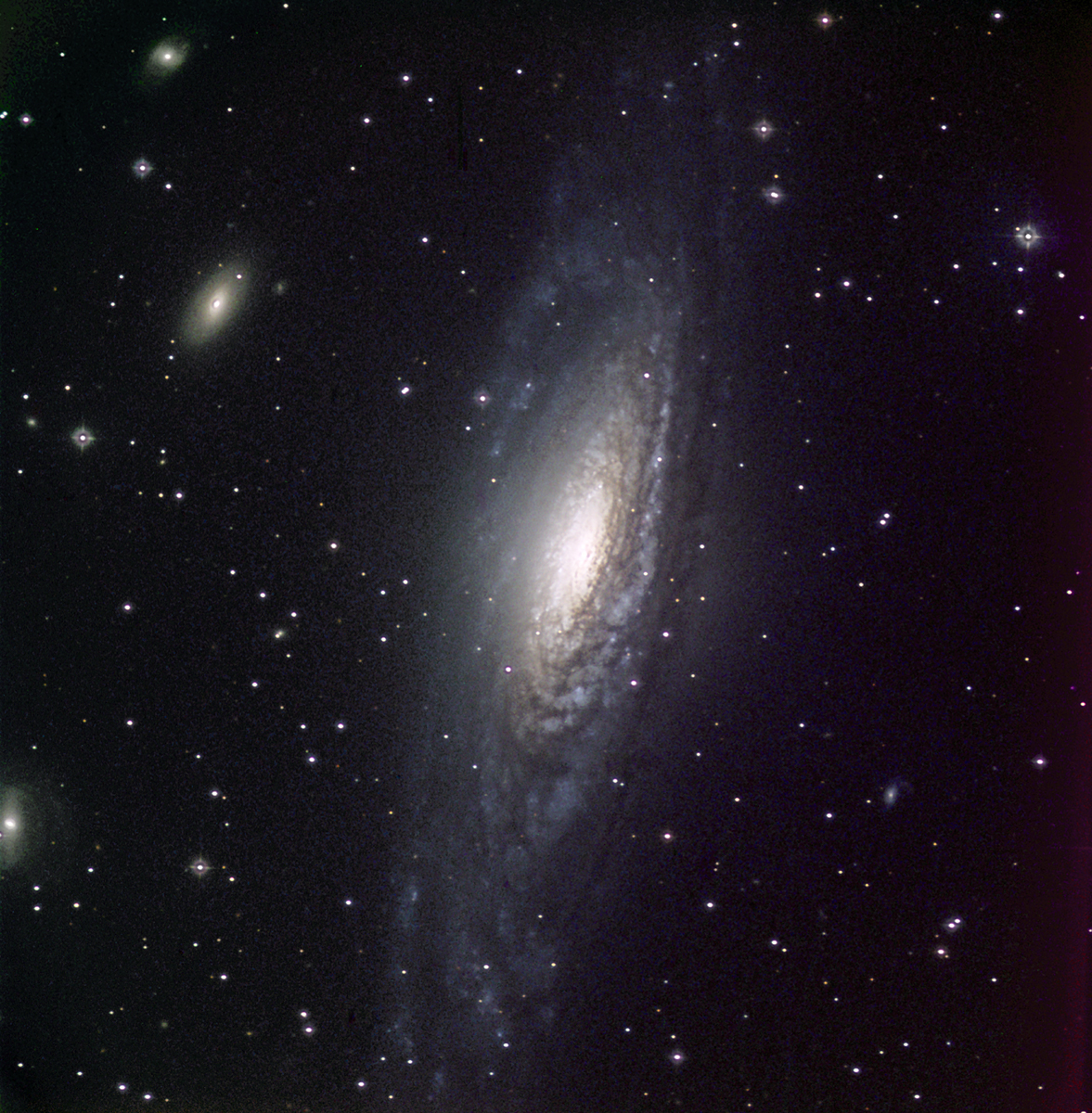
NGC 7331

Preceded by Kyle E. Smalley	Amateur Achievement Award of Astronomical Society of the Pacific; 2004	Succeeded by Tim Hunter
