= RTMC Astronomy Expo =

The RTMC Astronomy Expo was one of the major gatherings of amateur astronomers in the United States for five decades, from 1969 to 2019.

== History ==
Founded by Clifford W. Holmes and the Riverside Astronomical Society, the RTMC Astronomy Expo began in 1969 as the Riverside Telescope Makers Conference at Riverside City College in Riverside, California. It consisted of a series of lectures about astronomy and telescope making with a competition for quality and innovative telescopes. In 1973 it was moved to a dark-sky site near Idyllwild and in 1975 it was moved to its last home near Big Bear City. It was held on the three-day Memorial Day weekend. In 2010, it was held in May on the weekend that corresponded with new moon to allow amateur astronomers the best viewing conditions. Due to low attendance the date was moved back to the Memorial Day weekend in 2011

The organization annually presented the Clifford W. Holmes Award for "Major Contribution to Popularizing Astronomy, the Warren Estes Memorial Award for "Best Use of Simple Materials and Technique" in making telescopes, and the Clyde Tombaugh Award "Creative Innovation in Telescope Design".

To better reflect the evolution of amateur astronomy, the Riverside Telescope Makers Conference was renamed the RTMC Astronomy Expo in 2003. Each year the scope of activities continued to grow and evolve and had lectures, workshops, extensive beginners activities, a swap meet, astronomy clubs and other organizations, and vendors demonstrating and selling astronomical products. The Expo promoted family activities with swimming, canoeing, horseback riding, archery, wall climbing. Extensive hiking and mountain biking trails were also available.

On 12 October 2019, the Board of the RTMC announced that 2019 was the last year that the Astronomy Expo will be held.

== Nightfall ==
The RTMC also produced an early autumn star party called Nightfall in Borrego Springs, California. Nightfall is still held by the Riverside Astronomical Society on the weekend in October that corresponds with the new moon.

== Pacific Astronomy and Telescope Show (PATS) ==
In 2007, the Riverside Telescope Makers Conference, Inc. announced a fall event to be held in Pasadena named the Pacific Astronomy and Telescope Show (PATS). This annual event was held annually 2008 thru 2012 at the Pasadena Convention Center and focused displays by commercial vendors, astronomy clubs and other organizations as well as talks and workshops. The first PATS was held September 13–14, 2008. The 2013 event was cancelled. PATS was designed to complement the ongoing RTMC Astronomy Expo.
