= List of minor planets: 39001–40000 =

The following is a partial list of minor planets, running from minor-planet number 39001 through 40000, inclusive. The primary data for this and other partial lists is based on JPL's "Small-Body Orbital Elements" and data available from the Minor Planet Center. Critical list information is also provided by the MPC, unless otherwise specified from Lowell Observatory. A detailed description of the table's columns and additional sources are given on the main page including a complete list of every page in this series, and a statistical break-up on the dynamical classification of minor planets.

Also see the summary list of all named bodies in numerical and alphabetical order, and the corresponding naming citations for the number range of this particular list. New namings may only be added to this list after official publication, as the preannouncement of names is condemned by the Working Group for Small Bodies Nomenclature of the International Astronomical Union.

Near-Earth obj.	MBA (inner)	MBA (outer)	Centaur
Mars-crosser	MBA (middle)	Jupiter trojan	Trans-Neptunian obj.
Unclassified

== 39001–39100 ==
Designation			Discovery			Properties		Ref
Permanent	Provisional	Named after	Date	Site	Discoverer(s)	Category	Diam.	Ref
39001	2000 UN_{27}	—	October 24, 2000	Socorro	LINEAR	ADE	7.2 km	MPC · JPL
39002	2000 UO_{33}	—	October 18, 2000	Socorro	LINEAR	·	4.7 km	MPC · JPL
39003	2000 UL_{37}	—	October 24, 2000	Socorro	LINEAR	·	2.8 km	MPC · JPL
39004	2000 UV_{37}	—	October 24, 2000	Socorro	LINEAR	·	4.8 km	MPC · JPL
39005	2000 UK_{39}	—	October 24, 2000	Socorro	LINEAR	·	2.2 km	MPC · JPL
39006	2000 UH_{40}	—	October 24, 2000	Socorro	LINEAR	·	3.6 km	MPC · JPL
39007	2000 UK_{40}	—	October 24, 2000	Socorro	LINEAR	·	3.2 km	MPC · JPL
39008	2000 UU_{41}	—	October 24, 2000	Socorro	LINEAR	·	3.4 km	MPC · JPL
39009	2000 UZ_{42}	—	October 24, 2000	Socorro	LINEAR	·	2.6 km	MPC · JPL
39010	2000 UU_{44}	—	October 24, 2000	Socorro	LINEAR	·	5.3 km	MPC · JPL
39011	2000 UY_{44}	—	October 24, 2000	Socorro	LINEAR	·	9.3 km	MPC · JPL
39012	2000 UG_{46}	—	October 24, 2000	Socorro	LINEAR	HOF	7.0 km	MPC · JPL
39013	2000 UA_{47}	—	October 24, 2000	Socorro	LINEAR	·	3.3 km	MPC · JPL
39014	2000 UO_{49}	—	October 24, 2000	Socorro	LINEAR	·	3.5 km	MPC · JPL
39015	2000 UR_{49}	—	October 24, 2000	Socorro	LINEAR	KOR	4.4 km	MPC · JPL
39016	2000 UH_{50}	—	October 24, 2000	Socorro	LINEAR	·	3.2 km	MPC · JPL
39017	2000 UL_{50}	—	October 24, 2000	Socorro	LINEAR	·	3.0 km	MPC · JPL
39018	2000 UM_{53}	—	October 24, 2000	Socorro	LINEAR	CYB · 2:1J	7.0 km	MPC · JPL
39019	2000 UR_{53}	—	October 24, 2000	Socorro	LINEAR	·	3.1 km	MPC · JPL
39020	2000 UT_{53}	—	October 24, 2000	Socorro	LINEAR	·	3.8 km	MPC · JPL
39021	2000 UO_{54}	—	October 24, 2000	Socorro	LINEAR	·	3.4 km	MPC · JPL
39022	2000 UP_{54}	—	October 24, 2000	Socorro	LINEAR	·	5.4 km	MPC · JPL
39023	2000 UZ_{55}	—	October 24, 2000	Socorro	LINEAR	·	4.5 km	MPC · JPL
39024	2000 UW_{58}	—	October 25, 2000	Socorro	LINEAR	·	4.3 km	MPC · JPL
39025	2000 UA_{59}	—	October 25, 2000	Socorro	LINEAR	·	2.6 km	MPC · JPL
39026	2000 UD_{65}	—	October 25, 2000	Socorro	LINEAR	·	1.7 km	MPC · JPL
39027	2000 UR_{66}	—	October 25, 2000	Socorro	LINEAR	·	2.5 km	MPC · JPL
39028	2000 UX_{70}	—	October 25, 2000	Socorro	LINEAR	·	2.6 km	MPC · JPL
39029	2000 UP_{72}	—	October 25, 2000	Socorro	LINEAR	·	3.0 km	MPC · JPL
39030	2000 UG_{74}	—	October 29, 2000	Socorro	LINEAR	ADE	7.6 km	MPC · JPL
39031	2000 UH_{76}	—	October 29, 2000	Socorro	LINEAR	(194)	2.8 km	MPC · JPL
39032	2000 UU_{76}	—	October 24, 2000	Socorro	LINEAR	fast	5.1 km	MPC · JPL
39033	2000 UX_{77}	—	October 24, 2000	Socorro	LINEAR	V	1.2 km	MPC · JPL
39034	2000 UE_{78}	—	October 24, 2000	Socorro	LINEAR	HYG	7.8 km	MPC · JPL
39035	2000 UH_{78}	—	October 24, 2000	Socorro	LINEAR	HOF	6.1 km	MPC · JPL
39036	2000 UQ_{78}	—	October 24, 2000	Socorro	LINEAR	slow	1.8 km	MPC · JPL
39037	2000 UG_{79}	—	October 24, 2000	Socorro	LINEAR	·	2.4 km	MPC · JPL
39038	2000 UE_{80}	—	October 24, 2000	Socorro	LINEAR	·	4.4 km	MPC · JPL
39039	2000 UN_{82}	—	October 29, 2000	Socorro	LINEAR	(12739)	3.8 km	MPC · JPL
39040	2000 UH_{87}	—	October 31, 2000	Socorro	LINEAR	slow	1.9 km	MPC · JPL
39041	2000 UW_{89}	—	October 31, 2000	Socorro	LINEAR	·	8.9 km	MPC · JPL
39042	2000 UX_{89}	—	October 31, 2000	Socorro	LINEAR	EOS	3.8 km	MPC · JPL
39043	2000 UT_{90}	—	October 24, 2000	Socorro	LINEAR	·	3.2 km	MPC · JPL
39044	2000 UD_{91}	—	October 25, 2000	Socorro	LINEAR	·	1.6 km	MPC · JPL
39045	2000 US_{93}	—	October 25, 2000	Socorro	LINEAR	·	2.4 km	MPC · JPL
39046	2000 UZ_{94}	—	October 25, 2000	Socorro	LINEAR	EUN	4.1 km	MPC · JPL
39047	2000 UQ_{95}	—	October 25, 2000	Socorro	LINEAR	·	4.8 km	MPC · JPL
39048	2000 UJ_{96}	—	October 25, 2000	Socorro	LINEAR	·	5.8 km	MPC · JPL
39049	2000 UJ_{97}	—	October 25, 2000	Socorro	LINEAR	·	5.7 km	MPC · JPL
39050	2000 UQ_{98}	—	October 25, 2000	Socorro	LINEAR	·	1.7 km	MPC · JPL
39051	2000 UB_{99}	—	October 25, 2000	Socorro	LINEAR	V	2.1 km	MPC · JPL
39052	2000 UL_{99}	—	October 25, 2000	Socorro	LINEAR	·	10 km	MPC · JPL
39053	2000 UX_{99}	—	October 25, 2000	Socorro	LINEAR	·	2.2 km	MPC · JPL
39054	2000 UA_{103}	—	October 25, 2000	Socorro	LINEAR	PAD	6.1 km	MPC · JPL
39055	2000 UO_{103}	—	October 25, 2000	Socorro	LINEAR	(1298)	5.0 km	MPC · JPL
39056	2000 UR_{103}	—	October 25, 2000	Socorro	LINEAR	·	9.3 km	MPC · JPL
39057	2000 UE_{104}	—	October 25, 2000	Socorro	LINEAR	EUN	3.7 km	MPC · JPL
39058	2000 UM_{104}	—	October 25, 2000	Socorro	LINEAR	·	2.4 km	MPC · JPL
39059	2000 UB_{106}	—	October 29, 2000	Socorro	LINEAR	·	3.4 km	MPC · JPL
39060	2000 UD_{106}	—	October 29, 2000	Socorro	LINEAR	·	4.5 km	MPC · JPL
39061	2000 UX_{108}	—	October 31, 2000	Socorro	LINEAR	·	2.7 km	MPC · JPL
39062	2000 US_{109}	—	October 31, 2000	Socorro	LINEAR	·	5.7 km	MPC · JPL
39063	2000 UZ_{110}	—	October 26, 2000	Kitt Peak	Spacewatch	·	3.5 km	MPC · JPL
39064	2000 UD_{111}	—	October 26, 2000	Kitt Peak	Spacewatch	AGN	3.0 km	MPC · JPL
39065	2000 UY_{111}	—	October 29, 2000	Kitt Peak	Spacewatch	·	4.0 km	MPC · JPL
39066	2000 US_{112}	—	October 24, 2000	Socorro	LINEAR	·	3.9 km	MPC · JPL
39067	2000 VG_{3}	—	November 1, 2000	Desert Beaver	W. K. Y. Yeung	·	2.4 km	MPC · JPL
39068	2000 VW_{9}	—	November 1, 2000	Socorro	LINEAR	THM	5.5 km	MPC · JPL
39069	2000 VM_{10}	—	November 1, 2000	Socorro	LINEAR	·	9.8 km	MPC · JPL
39070	2000 VS_{11}	—	November 1, 2000	Socorro	LINEAR	·	2.3 km	MPC · JPL
39071	2000 VS_{14}	—	November 1, 2000	Socorro	LINEAR	·	2.0 km	MPC · JPL
39072	2000 VM_{17}	—	November 1, 2000	Socorro	LINEAR	·	5.5 km	MPC · JPL
39073	2000 VN_{17}	—	November 1, 2000	Socorro	LINEAR	·	6.4 km	MPC · JPL
39074	2000 VX_{17}	—	November 1, 2000	Socorro	LINEAR	·	6.6 km	MPC · JPL
39075	2000 VA_{21}	—	November 1, 2000	Socorro	LINEAR	KOR	3.5 km	MPC · JPL
39076	2000 VL_{22}	—	November 1, 2000	Socorro	LINEAR	·	4.4 km	MPC · JPL
39077	2000 VJ_{24}	—	November 1, 2000	Socorro	LINEAR	·	6.1 km	MPC · JPL
39078	2000 VJ_{26}	—	November 1, 2000	Socorro	LINEAR	·	1.6 km	MPC · JPL
39079	2000 VF_{29}	—	November 1, 2000	Socorro	LINEAR	·	2.0 km	MPC · JPL
39080	2000 VW_{30}	—	November 1, 2000	Socorro	LINEAR	·	2.4 km	MPC · JPL
39081	2000 VO_{31}	—	November 1, 2000	Socorro	LINEAR	NYS ·	3.7 km	MPC · JPL
39082	2000 VB_{32}	—	November 1, 2000	Socorro	LINEAR	·	6.3 km	MPC · JPL
39083	2000 VA_{34}	—	November 1, 2000	Socorro	LINEAR	THM	5.7 km	MPC · JPL
39084	2000 VB_{34}	—	November 1, 2000	Socorro	LINEAR	·	5.7 km	MPC · JPL
39085	2000 VW_{34}	—	November 1, 2000	Socorro	LINEAR	·	10 km	MPC · JPL
39086	2000 VG_{41}	—	November 1, 2000	Socorro	LINEAR	·	2.6 km	MPC · JPL
39087	2000 VN_{50}	—	November 2, 2000	Socorro	LINEAR	V	3.5 km	MPC · JPL
39088	2000 VO_{50}	—	November 2, 2000	Socorro	LINEAR	V	2.2 km	MPC · JPL
39089	2000 VP_{52}	—	November 3, 2000	Socorro	LINEAR	AGN	2.2 km	MPC · JPL
39090	2000 VM_{54}	—	November 3, 2000	Socorro	LINEAR	V	2.2 km	MPC · JPL
39091	2000 VX_{54}	—	November 3, 2000	Socorro	LINEAR	·	5.8 km	MPC · JPL
39092	2000 VB_{57}	—	November 3, 2000	Socorro	LINEAR	·	6.0 km	MPC · JPL
39093	2000 VM_{58}	—	November 2, 2000	Socorro	LINEAR	EOS	6.7 km	MPC · JPL
39094	2000 VQ_{58}	—	November 1, 2000	Socorro	LINEAR	LIX	10 km	MPC · JPL
39095	2000 VC_{59}	—	November 3, 2000	Socorro	LINEAR	·	1.8 km	MPC · JPL
39096	2000 WE_{1}	—	November 17, 2000	Socorro	LINEAR	·	4.1 km	MPC · JPL
39097	2000 WX_{7}	—	November 20, 2000	Socorro	LINEAR	V	1.5 km	MPC · JPL
39098	2000 WR_{12}	—	November 22, 2000	Haleakala	NEAT	·	2.3 km	MPC · JPL
39099	2000 WS_{12}	—	November 22, 2000	Haleakala	NEAT	RAF	4.1 km	MPC · JPL
39100	2000 WD_{14}	—	November 20, 2000	Socorro	LINEAR	(12739)	3.3 km	MPC · JPL

== 39101–39200 ==
back to top

Designation			Discovery			Properties		Ref
Permanent	Provisional	Named after	Date	Site	Discoverer(s)	Category	Diam.	Ref
39101	2000 WR_{14}	—	November 20, 2000	Socorro	LINEAR	·	3.6 km	MPC · JPL
39102	2000 WF_{17}	—	November 21, 2000	Socorro	LINEAR	·	5.5 km	MPC · JPL
39103	2000 WQ_{17}	—	November 21, 2000	Socorro	LINEAR	·	8.1 km	MPC · JPL
39104	2000 WO_{18}	—	November 21, 2000	Socorro	LINEAR	THM	7.1 km	MPC · JPL
39105	2000 WY_{18}	—	November 21, 2000	Socorro	LINEAR	TIR	6.0 km	MPC · JPL
39106	2000 WE_{23}	—	November 20, 2000	Socorro	LINEAR	·	5.5 km	MPC · JPL
39107	2000 WS_{24}	—	November 20, 2000	Socorro	LINEAR	·	3.8 km	MPC · JPL
39108	2000 WG_{26}	—	November 21, 2000	Socorro	LINEAR	·	3.1 km	MPC · JPL
39109	2000 WG_{27}	—	November 22, 2000	Kitt Peak	Spacewatch	·	3.3 km	MPC · JPL
39110	2000 WL_{28}	—	November 23, 2000	Haleakala	NEAT	·	1.8 km	MPC · JPL
39111	2000 WR_{30}	—	November 20, 2000	Socorro	LINEAR	·	2.4 km	MPC · JPL
39112	2000 WB_{31}	—	November 20, 2000	Socorro	LINEAR	EUN	4.1 km	MPC · JPL
39113	2000 WM_{32}	—	November 20, 2000	Socorro	LINEAR	·	4.2 km	MPC · JPL
39114	2000 WC_{33}	—	November 20, 2000	Socorro	LINEAR	MRX	2.5 km	MPC · JPL
39115	2000 WF_{33}	—	November 20, 2000	Socorro	LINEAR	·	5.3 km	MPC · JPL
39116	2000 WJ_{33}	—	November 20, 2000	Socorro	LINEAR	·	5.9 km	MPC · JPL
39117	2000 WE_{34}	—	November 20, 2000	Socorro	LINEAR	(5)	3.5 km	MPC · JPL
39118	2000 WD_{35}	—	November 20, 2000	Socorro	LINEAR	EOS	5.8 km	MPC · JPL
39119	2000 WF_{37}	—	November 20, 2000	Socorro	LINEAR	·	3.1 km	MPC · JPL
39120	2000 WZ_{38}	—	November 20, 2000	Socorro	LINEAR	·	3.1 km	MPC · JPL
39121	2000 WY_{40}	—	November 20, 2000	Socorro	LINEAR	·	3.3 km	MPC · JPL
39122	2000 WL_{42}	—	November 21, 2000	Socorro	LINEAR	·	3.1 km	MPC · JPL
39123	2000 WR_{42}	—	November 21, 2000	Socorro	LINEAR	·	4.1 km	MPC · JPL
39124	2000 WU_{43}	—	November 21, 2000	Socorro	LINEAR	·	4.8 km	MPC · JPL
39125	2000 WC_{44}	—	November 21, 2000	Socorro	LINEAR	NYS	3.7 km	MPC · JPL
39126	2000 WP_{44}	—	November 21, 2000	Socorro	LINEAR	·	8.5 km	MPC · JPL
39127	2000 WY_{45}	—	November 21, 2000	Socorro	LINEAR	·	2.3 km	MPC · JPL
39128	2000 WM_{46}	—	November 21, 2000	Socorro	LINEAR	·	6.2 km	MPC · JPL
39129	2000 WZ_{53}	—	November 27, 2000	Kitt Peak	Spacewatch	·	3.5 km	MPC · JPL
39130	2000 WO_{56}	—	November 21, 2000	Socorro	LINEAR	·	2.7 km	MPC · JPL
39131	2000 WG_{58}	—	November 21, 2000	Socorro	LINEAR	·	3.5 km	MPC · JPL
39132	2000 WU_{58}	—	November 21, 2000	Socorro	LINEAR	TIR ·	4.8 km	MPC · JPL
39133	2000 WV_{58}	—	November 21, 2000	Socorro	LINEAR	·	5.9 km	MPC · JPL
39134	2000 WB_{59}	—	November 21, 2000	Socorro	LINEAR	·	2.8 km	MPC · JPL
39135	2000 WX_{59}	—	November 21, 2000	Socorro	LINEAR	·	10 km	MPC · JPL
39136	2000 WC_{61}	—	November 21, 2000	Socorro	LINEAR	·	5.8 km	MPC · JPL
39137 Wymanwong	2000 WX_{62}	Wymanwong	November 26, 2000	Desert Beaver	W. K. Y. Yeung	EOS	5.4 km	MPC · JPL
39138	2000 WU_{68}	—	November 19, 2000	Socorro	LINEAR	EUN	4.4 km	MPC · JPL
39139	2000 WO_{71}	—	November 19, 2000	Socorro	LINEAR	·	4.1 km	MPC · JPL
39140	2000 WC_{75}	—	November 20, 2000	Socorro	LINEAR	·	2.2 km	MPC · JPL
39141	2000 WN_{77}	—	November 20, 2000	Socorro	LINEAR	·	5.8 km	MPC · JPL
39142	2000 WR_{78}	—	November 20, 2000	Socorro	LINEAR	(5)	3.1 km	MPC · JPL
39143	2000 WH_{80}	—	November 20, 2000	Socorro	LINEAR	·	3.8 km	MPC · JPL
39144	2000 WN_{86}	—	November 20, 2000	Socorro	LINEAR	NYS	4.0 km	MPC · JPL
39145	2000 WU_{90}	—	November 21, 2000	Socorro	LINEAR	KOR	3.4 km	MPC · JPL
39146	2000 WV_{90}	—	November 21, 2000	Socorro	LINEAR	·	8.4 km	MPC · JPL
39147	2000 WU_{92}	—	November 21, 2000	Socorro	LINEAR	HYG	6.6 km	MPC · JPL
39148	2000 WM_{93}	—	November 21, 2000	Socorro	LINEAR	MAR	4.1 km	MPC · JPL
39149	2000 WV_{95}	—	November 21, 2000	Socorro	LINEAR	·	8.1 km	MPC · JPL
39150	2000 WN_{97}	—	November 21, 2000	Socorro	LINEAR	NYS	4.6 km	MPC · JPL
39151	2000 WA_{99}	—	November 21, 2000	Socorro	LINEAR	·	3.8 km	MPC · JPL
39152	2000 WN_{102}	—	November 26, 2000	Socorro	LINEAR	·	5.7 km	MPC · JPL
39153	2000 WX_{102}	—	November 26, 2000	Socorro	LINEAR	·	3.4 km	MPC · JPL
39154	2000 WY_{102}	—	November 26, 2000	Socorro	LINEAR	·	2.3 km	MPC · JPL
39155	2000 WK_{103}	—	November 26, 2000	Socorro	LINEAR	·	2.8 km	MPC · JPL
39156	2000 WF_{109}	—	November 20, 2000	Socorro	LINEAR	(2076)	3.4 km	MPC · JPL
39157	2000 WK_{111}	—	November 20, 2000	Socorro	LINEAR	·	2.2 km	MPC · JPL
39158	2000 WW_{114}	—	November 20, 2000	Socorro	LINEAR	·	2.5 km	MPC · JPL
39159	2000 WT_{115}	—	November 20, 2000	Socorro	LINEAR	HYG	6.7 km	MPC · JPL
39160	2000 WC_{116}	—	November 20, 2000	Socorro	LINEAR	·	12 km	MPC · JPL
39161	2000 WH_{117}	—	November 20, 2000	Socorro	LINEAR	·	4.3 km	MPC · JPL
39162	2000 WX_{118}	—	November 20, 2000	Socorro	LINEAR	·	4.1 km	MPC · JPL
39163	2000 WM_{119}	—	November 20, 2000	Socorro	LINEAR	·	9.3 km	MPC · JPL
39164	2000 WG_{123}	—	November 29, 2000	Socorro	LINEAR	·	3.7 km	MPC · JPL
39165	2000 WW_{129}	—	November 19, 2000	Kitt Peak	Spacewatch	·	2.2 km	MPC · JPL
39166	2000 WO_{130}	—	November 20, 2000	Kitt Peak	Spacewatch	·	2.8 km	MPC · JPL
39167 Opitom	2000 WT_{130}	Opitom	November 20, 2000	Anderson Mesa	LONEOS	THM	6.1 km	MPC · JPL
39168	2000 WW_{131}	—	November 20, 2000	Anderson Mesa	LONEOS	KOR	3.2 km	MPC · JPL
39169	2000 WK_{135}	—	November 19, 2000	Socorro	LINEAR	·	3.1 km	MPC · JPL
39170	2000 WR_{140}	—	November 21, 2000	Socorro	LINEAR	KOR	3.3 km	MPC · JPL
39171	2000 WE_{145}	—	November 22, 2000	Haleakala	NEAT	·	6.9 km	MPC · JPL
39172	2000 WZ_{148}	—	November 29, 2000	Haleakala	NEAT	·	7.0 km	MPC · JPL
39173	2000 WV_{151}	—	November 29, 2000	Haleakala	NEAT	GEF	3.5 km	MPC · JPL
39174	2000 WG_{152}	—	November 27, 2000	Socorro	LINEAR	·	2.2 km	MPC · JPL
39175	2000 WL_{155}	—	November 30, 2000	Socorro	LINEAR	·	2.8 km	MPC · JPL
39176	2000 WK_{156}	—	November 30, 2000	Socorro	LINEAR	·	2.6 km	MPC · JPL
39177	2000 WJ_{157}	—	November 30, 2000	Socorro	LINEAR	·	3.1 km	MPC · JPL
39178	2000 WK_{157}	—	November 30, 2000	Socorro	LINEAR	·	4.9 km	MPC · JPL
39179	2000 WU_{158}	—	November 30, 2000	Haleakala	NEAT	·	4.0 km	MPC · JPL
39180	2000 WA_{161}	—	November 20, 2000	Anderson Mesa	LONEOS	MAR · slow	5.0 km	MPC · JPL
39181	2000 WP_{161}	—	November 20, 2000	Anderson Mesa	LONEOS	GEF	3.2 km	MPC · JPL
39182	2000 WF_{164}	—	November 21, 2000	Socorro	LINEAR	·	3.2 km	MPC · JPL
39183	2000 WE_{165}	—	November 22, 2000	Haleakala	NEAT	·	3.5 km	MPC · JPL
39184 Willgrundy	2000 WG_{166}	Willgrundy	November 24, 2000	Anderson Mesa	LONEOS	HOF	5.5 km	MPC · JPL
39185	2000 WD_{167}	—	November 24, 2000	Anderson Mesa	LONEOS	·	5.0 km	MPC · JPL
39186	2000 WK_{168}	—	November 25, 2000	Kitt Peak	Spacewatch	·	5.2 km	MPC · JPL
39187	2000 WL_{169}	—	November 26, 2000	Socorro	LINEAR	BRA	3.8 km	MPC · JPL
39188	2000 WM_{172}	—	November 25, 2000	Socorro	LINEAR	·	3.6 km	MPC · JPL
39189	2000 WT_{172}	—	November 25, 2000	Socorro	LINEAR	·	5.5 km	MPC · JPL
39190	2000 WN_{179}	—	November 26, 2000	Socorro	LINEAR	·	3.1 km	MPC · JPL
39191	2000 WU_{183}	—	November 30, 2000	Anderson Mesa	LONEOS	·	5.3 km	MPC · JPL
39192	2000 WL_{186}	—	November 27, 2000	Socorro	LINEAR	·	9.7 km	MPC · JPL
39193	2000 WJ_{188}	—	November 18, 2000	Anderson Mesa	LONEOS	·	3.2 km	MPC · JPL
39194	2000 WK_{188}	—	November 18, 2000	Anderson Mesa	LONEOS	·	11 km	MPC · JPL
39195	2000 WV_{189}	—	November 18, 2000	Anderson Mesa	LONEOS	·	1.9 km	MPC · JPL
39196	2000 WN_{191}	—	November 19, 2000	Anderson Mesa	LONEOS	·	3.2 km	MPC · JPL
39197	2000 XA	—	December 1, 2000	Haleakala	NEAT	H	3.5 km	MPC · JPL
39198	2000 XY_{4}	—	December 1, 2000	Socorro	LINEAR	·	8.5 km	MPC · JPL
39199	2000 XN_{7}	—	December 1, 2000	Socorro	LINEAR	·	10 km	MPC · JPL
39200	2000 XX_{11}	—	December 4, 2000	Socorro	LINEAR	·	5.2 km	MPC · JPL

== 39201–39300 ==
back to top

Designation			Discovery			Properties		Ref
Permanent	Provisional	Named after	Date	Site	Discoverer(s)	Category	Diam.	Ref
39201	2000 XN_{12}	—	December 4, 2000	Socorro	LINEAR	V	2.1 km	MPC · JPL
39202	2000 XB_{18}	—	December 4, 2000	Socorro	LINEAR	EUN	5.2 km	MPC · JPL
39203	2000 XH_{18}	—	December 4, 2000	Socorro	LINEAR	MAR · slow	3.7 km	MPC · JPL
39204	2000 XF_{20}	—	December 4, 2000	Socorro	LINEAR	·	2.6 km	MPC · JPL
39205	2000 XG_{20}	—	December 4, 2000	Socorro	LINEAR	·	3.1 km	MPC · JPL
39206	2000 XO_{20}	—	December 4, 2000	Socorro	LINEAR	·	4.5 km	MPC · JPL
39207	2000 XQ_{20}	—	December 4, 2000	Socorro	LINEAR	·	4.4 km	MPC · JPL
39208	2000 XY_{22}	—	December 4, 2000	Socorro	LINEAR	URS	8.2 km	MPC · JPL
39209	2000 XC_{26}	—	December 4, 2000	Socorro	LINEAR	·	5.1 km	MPC · JPL
39210	2000 XK_{30}	—	December 4, 2000	Socorro	LINEAR	slow	2.9 km	MPC · JPL
39211	2000 XB_{34}	—	December 4, 2000	Socorro	LINEAR	EOS	5.0 km	MPC · JPL
39212	2000 XC_{38}	—	December 5, 2000	Socorro	LINEAR	TIR	10 km	MPC · JPL
39213	2000 XZ_{40}	—	December 5, 2000	Socorro	LINEAR	·	7.2 km	MPC · JPL
39214	2000 XG_{42}	—	December 5, 2000	Socorro	LINEAR	·	5.6 km	MPC · JPL
39215	2000 XV_{46}	—	December 7, 2000	Socorro	LINEAR	·	5.6 km	MPC · JPL
39216	2000 XA_{48}	—	December 4, 2000	Socorro	LINEAR	·	4.4 km	MPC · JPL
39217	2000 XU_{49}	—	December 4, 2000	Socorro	LINEAR	·	5.8 km	MPC · JPL
39218	2000 YY_{3}	—	December 18, 2000	Kitt Peak	Spacewatch	V	3.5 km	MPC · JPL
39219	2000 YV_{4}	—	December 20, 2000	Kitt Peak	Spacewatch	·	3.3 km	MPC · JPL
39220	2000 YN_{5}	—	December 19, 2000	Haleakala	NEAT	·	3.1 km	MPC · JPL
39221	2000 YK_{8}	—	December 20, 2000	Ondřejov	P. Kušnirák, P. Pravec	AGN	2.5 km	MPC · JPL
39222	2000 YC_{18}	—	December 20, 2000	Socorro	LINEAR	·	1.7 km	MPC · JPL
39223	2000 YP_{20}	—	December 28, 2000	Kitt Peak	Spacewatch	·	2.7 km	MPC · JPL
39224	2000 YR_{21}	—	December 24, 2000	Anderson Mesa	LONEOS	EUN	3.5 km	MPC · JPL
39225	2000 YD_{26}	—	December 23, 2000	Socorro	LINEAR	·	4.5 km	MPC · JPL
39226	2000 YE_{26}	—	December 23, 2000	Socorro	LINEAR	·	3.0 km	MPC · JPL
39227	2000 YS_{26}	—	December 28, 2000	Socorro	LINEAR	·	5.2 km	MPC · JPL
39228	2000 YX_{28}	—	December 29, 2000	Ondřejov	P. Kušnirák	·	6.5 km	MPC · JPL
39229	2000 YJ_{30}	—	December 31, 2000	Haleakala	NEAT	L4	20 km	MPC · JPL
39230	2000 YZ_{37}	—	December 30, 2000	Socorro	LINEAR	NYS	4.7 km	MPC · JPL
39231	2000 YZ_{38}	—	December 30, 2000	Socorro	LINEAR	·	8.1 km	MPC · JPL
39232	2000 YF_{42}	—	December 30, 2000	Socorro	LINEAR	·	2.8 km	MPC · JPL
39233	2000 YZ_{46}	—	December 30, 2000	Socorro	LINEAR	·	5.9 km	MPC · JPL
39234	2000 YD_{48}	—	December 30, 2000	Socorro	LINEAR	THM	8.5 km	MPC · JPL
39235	2000 YH_{55}	—	December 30, 2000	Socorro	LINEAR	·	5.2 km	MPC · JPL
39236	2000 YX_{56}	—	December 30, 2000	Socorro	LINEAR	·	3.2 km	MPC · JPL
39237	2000 YH_{61}	—	December 30, 2000	Socorro	LINEAR	·	7.9 km	MPC · JPL
39238	2000 YE_{62}	—	December 30, 2000	Socorro	LINEAR	·	6.7 km	MPC · JPL
39239	2000 YN_{69}	—	December 30, 2000	Socorro	LINEAR	HOF	7.6 km	MPC · JPL
39240	2000 YZ_{69}	—	December 30, 2000	Socorro	LINEAR	slow	3.5 km	MPC · JPL
39241	2000 YW_{71}	—	December 30, 2000	Socorro	LINEAR	·	5.1 km	MPC · JPL
39242	2000 YQ_{75}	—	December 30, 2000	Socorro	LINEAR	·	3.7 km	MPC · JPL
39243	2000 YU_{76}	—	December 30, 2000	Socorro	LINEAR	EOS	5.2 km	MPC · JPL
39244	2000 YS_{77}	—	December 30, 2000	Socorro	LINEAR	EOS	5.8 km	MPC · JPL
39245	2000 YY_{80}	—	December 30, 2000	Socorro	LINEAR	·	4.3 km	MPC · JPL
39246	2000 YU_{81}	—	December 30, 2000	Socorro	LINEAR	·	3.6 km	MPC · JPL
39247	2000 YU_{86}	—	December 30, 2000	Socorro	LINEAR	·	10 km	MPC · JPL
39248	2000 YM_{87}	—	December 30, 2000	Socorro	LINEAR	·	5.0 km	MPC · JPL
39249	2000 YR_{88}	—	December 30, 2000	Socorro	LINEAR	·	11 km	MPC · JPL
39250	2000 YR_{95}	—	December 30, 2000	Socorro	LINEAR	·	8.1 km	MPC · JPL
39251	2000 YL_{97}	—	December 30, 2000	Socorro	LINEAR	EOS	4.5 km	MPC · JPL
39252	2000 YU_{101}	—	December 28, 2000	Socorro	LINEAR	·	9.5 km	MPC · JPL
39253	2000 YH_{106}	—	December 30, 2000	Socorro	LINEAR	·	3.1 km	MPC · JPL
39254	2000 YF_{112}	—	December 30, 2000	Socorro	LINEAR	·	3.6 km	MPC · JPL
39255	2000 YA_{119}	—	December 30, 2000	Anderson Mesa	LONEOS	V	2.7 km	MPC · JPL
39256 Zacny	2000 YE_{120}	Zacny	December 19, 2000	Anderson Mesa	LONEOS	H	1.3 km	MPC · JPL
39257	2000 YT_{122}	—	December 28, 2000	Socorro	LINEAR	·	3.3 km	MPC · JPL
39258	2000 YZ_{134}	—	December 17, 2000	Anderson Mesa	LONEOS	EUN	4.1 km	MPC · JPL
39259	2000 YJ_{136}	—	December 23, 2000	Socorro	LINEAR	·	7.4 km	MPC · JPL
39260	2000 YE_{138}	—	December 26, 2000	Haleakala	NEAT	LIX	9.8 km	MPC · JPL
39261	2000 YG_{138}	—	December 26, 2000	Haleakala	NEAT	·	4.4 km	MPC · JPL
39262	2000 YK_{138}	—	December 26, 2000	Haleakala	NEAT	PHO	5.0 km	MPC · JPL
39263	2000 YK_{139}	—	December 27, 2000	Anderson Mesa	LONEOS	·	16 km	MPC · JPL
39264	2000 YQ_{139}	—	December 27, 2000	Anderson Mesa	LONEOS	L4	36 km	MPC · JPL
39265	2001 AH_{2}	—	January 3, 2001	Perth Observatory	Biggs, J.	PHO	3.6 km	MPC · JPL
39266	2001 AT_{2}	—	January 1, 2001	Kitt Peak	Spacewatch	T_{j} (2.99) · 3:2	16 km	MPC · JPL
39267	2001 AU_{3}	—	January 2, 2001	Socorro	LINEAR	·	9.3 km	MPC · JPL
39268	2001 AK_{7}	—	January 2, 2001	Socorro	LINEAR	EOS	6.5 km	MPC · JPL
39269	2001 AK_{9}	—	January 2, 2001	Socorro	LINEAR	·	5.0 km	MPC · JPL
39270	2001 AH_{11}	—	January 2, 2001	Socorro	LINEAR	L4	20 km	MPC · JPL
39271	2001 AM_{20}	—	January 3, 2001	Socorro	LINEAR	ADE	7.1 km	MPC · JPL
39272	2001 AB_{23}	—	January 3, 2001	Socorro	LINEAR	·	6.1 km	MPC · JPL
39273	2001 AO_{30}	—	January 4, 2001	Socorro	LINEAR	·	12 km	MPC · JPL
39274	2001 AP_{34}	—	January 4, 2001	Socorro	LINEAR	·	2.7 km	MPC · JPL
39275	2001 AV_{37}	—	January 5, 2001	Socorro	LINEAR	L4	21 km	MPC · JPL
39276	2001 AT_{39}	—	January 3, 2001	Anderson Mesa	LONEOS	·	9.0 km	MPC · JPL
39277	2001 BE_{6}	—	January 19, 2001	Socorro	LINEAR	·	3.8 km	MPC · JPL
39278	2001 BK_{9}	—	January 19, 2001	Socorro	LINEAR	L4	20 km	MPC · JPL
39279	2001 BZ_{21}	—	January 20, 2001	Socorro	LINEAR	·	3.2 km	MPC · JPL
39280	2001 BE_{24}	—	January 20, 2001	Socorro	LINEAR	L4	20 km	MPC · JPL
39281	2001 BZ_{35}	—	January 19, 2001	Socorro	LINEAR	EOS	5.4 km	MPC · JPL
39282	2001 BM_{36}	—	January 20, 2001	Socorro	LINEAR	HIL · 3:2 · slow	19 km	MPC · JPL
39283	2001 BN_{45}	—	January 21, 2001	Socorro	LINEAR	EUN	3.2 km	MPC · JPL
39284	2001 BB_{62}	—	January 26, 2001	Socorro	LINEAR	L4	17 km	MPC · JPL
39285 Kipkeino	2001 BP_{75}	Kipkeino	January 26, 2001	Kitt Peak	Spacewatch	L4 · ERY	18 km	MPC · JPL
39286	2001 CX_{6}	—	February 1, 2001	Socorro	LINEAR	L4	21 km	MPC · JPL
39287	2001 CD_{14}	—	February 1, 2001	Socorro	LINEAR	L4	13 km	MPC · JPL
39288	2001 CD_{21}	—	February 2, 2001	Socorro	LINEAR	L4	20 km	MPC · JPL
39289	2001 CT_{28}	—	February 2, 2001	Anderson Mesa	LONEOS	L4	13 km	MPC · JPL
39290 Landsman	2001 CC_{29}	Landsman	February 2, 2001	Anderson Mesa	LONEOS	VER	12 km	MPC · JPL
39291	2001 DG	—	February 16, 2001	Desert Beaver	W. K. Y. Yeung	·	3.3 km	MPC · JPL
39292	2001 DS_{4}	—	February 16, 2001	Socorro	LINEAR	L4	20 km	MPC · JPL
39293	2001 DQ_{10}	—	February 17, 2001	Socorro	LINEAR	L4	20 km	MPC · JPL
39294	2001 DB_{33}	—	February 17, 2001	Socorro	LINEAR	3:2	19 km	MPC · JPL
39295	2001 DF_{95}	—	February 18, 2001	Haleakala	NEAT	·	7.5 km	MPC · JPL
39296	2001 EQ_{4}	—	March 2, 2001	Anderson Mesa	LONEOS	·	2.4 km	MPC · JPL
39297	2001 FE_{53}	—	March 18, 2001	Socorro	LINEAR	(12739)	4.8 km	MPC · JPL
39298	2001 FV_{132}	—	March 20, 2001	Haleakala	NEAT	·	3.6 km	MPC · JPL
39299	2001 HF_{5}	—	April 17, 2001	Socorro	LINEAR	·	4.9 km	MPC · JPL
39300 Auyeungsungfan	2001 HM_{38}	Auyeungsungfan	April 30, 2001	Desert Beaver	W. K. Y. Yeung	·	3.1 km	MPC · JPL

== 39301–39400 ==
back to top

Designation			Discovery			Properties		Ref
Permanent	Provisional	Named after	Date	Site	Discoverer(s)	Category	Diam.	Ref
39301	2001 OB_{100}	—	July 27, 2001	Anderson Mesa	LONEOS	3:2	20 km	MPC · JPL
39302	2001 QC_{29}	—	August 16, 2001	Socorro	LINEAR	TIR	8.8 km	MPC · JPL
39303	2001 QR_{56}	—	August 16, 2001	Socorro	LINEAR	·	5.3 km	MPC · JPL
39304	2001 QX_{77}	—	August 16, 2001	Socorro	LINEAR	·	3.5 km	MPC · JPL
39305	2001 QX_{180}	—	August 29, 2001	Palomar	NEAT	·	15 km	MPC · JPL
39306	2001 SV_{249}	—	September 19, 2001	Socorro	LINEAR	THM	7.9 km	MPC · JPL
39307	2001 TJ_{42}	—	October 14, 2001	Socorro	LINEAR	·	3.5 km	MPC · JPL
39308	2001 TP_{57}	—	October 13, 2001	Socorro	LINEAR	·	5.3 km	MPC · JPL
39309	2001 TE_{59}	—	October 13, 2001	Socorro	LINEAR	·	7.1 km	MPC · JPL
39310	2001 TC_{64}	—	October 13, 2001	Socorro	LINEAR	KOR	3.7 km	MPC · JPL
39311	2001 TF_{76}	—	October 13, 2001	Socorro	LINEAR	·	4.8 km	MPC · JPL
39312	2001 TD_{93}	—	October 14, 2001	Socorro	LINEAR	·	9.4 km	MPC · JPL
39313	2001 TS_{104}	—	October 13, 2001	Socorro	LINEAR	·	3.9 km	MPC · JPL
39314 Moritakumi	2001 UH_{5}	Moritakumi	October 19, 2001	Bisei SG Center	BATTeRS	·	3.4 km	MPC · JPL
39315	2001 UA_{10}	—	October 17, 2001	Socorro	LINEAR	·	11 km	MPC · JPL
39316	2001 UH_{80}	—	October 20, 2001	Socorro	LINEAR	·	1.9 km	MPC · JPL
39317	2001 UU_{168}	—	October 19, 2001	Socorro	LINEAR	·	11 km	MPC · JPL
39318	2001 VT_{33}	—	November 9, 2001	Socorro	LINEAR	·	3.1 km	MPC · JPL
39319	2001 VT_{35}	—	November 9, 2001	Socorro	LINEAR	·	5.4 km	MPC · JPL
39320	2001 VK_{46}	—	November 9, 2001	Socorro	LINEAR	·	7.6 km	MPC · JPL
39321	2001 VC_{85}	—	November 12, 2001	Socorro	LINEAR	·	2.4 km	MPC · JPL
39322	2001 VH_{98}	—	November 15, 2001	Socorro	LINEAR	·	7.2 km	MPC · JPL
39323	2001 WO_{40}	—	November 17, 2001	Socorro	LINEAR	·	5.0 km	MPC · JPL
39324	2001 WZ_{86}	—	November 17, 2001	Socorro	LINEAR	·	2.6 km	MPC · JPL
39325	2001 WA_{87}	—	November 17, 2001	Socorro	LINEAR	(5)	2.6 km	MPC · JPL
39326	2001 XL_{37}	—	December 14, 2001	Socorro	LINEAR	(5931)	11 km	MPC · JPL
39327	2001 XY_{97}	—	December 10, 2001	Socorro	LINEAR	·	6.0 km	MPC · JPL
39328	2001 XO_{115}	—	December 13, 2001	Socorro	LINEAR	·	2.3 km	MPC · JPL
39329	2001 XW_{154}	—	December 14, 2001	Socorro	LINEAR	·	4.5 km	MPC · JPL
39330	2001 XZ_{195}	—	December 14, 2001	Socorro	LINEAR	NYS	2.0 km	MPC · JPL
39331	2001 YO_{87}	—	December 18, 2001	Socorro	LINEAR	·	5.2 km	MPC · JPL
39332 Lauwaiming	2002 AH_{10}	Lauwaiming	January 11, 2002	Desert Eagle	W. K. Y. Yeung	EOS	6.7 km	MPC · JPL
39333	2002 AM_{10}	—	January 4, 2002	Haleakala	NEAT	·	1.7 km	MPC · JPL
39334	2002 AV_{10}	—	January 6, 2002	Haleakala	NEAT	·	2.6 km	MPC · JPL
39335 Caccin	2002 AR_{12}	Caccin	January 10, 2002	Campo Imperatore	CINEOS	·	4.2 km	MPC · JPL
39336 Mariacapria	2002 AA_{13}	Mariacapria	January 11, 2002	Campo Imperatore	CINEOS	THM	4.9 km	MPC · JPL
39337	2002 AZ_{13}	—	January 12, 2002	Desert Eagle	W. K. Y. Yeung	·	2.0 km	MPC · JPL
39338	2002 AG_{28}	—	January 7, 2002	Anderson Mesa	LONEOS	NYS	2.3 km	MPC · JPL
39339	2002 AD_{32}	—	January 8, 2002	Haleakala	NEAT	THM	5.1 km	MPC · JPL
39340	2002 AS_{46}	—	January 9, 2002	Socorro	LINEAR	·	4.0 km	MPC · JPL
39341	2002 AM_{50}	—	January 9, 2002	Socorro	LINEAR	·	3.2 km	MPC · JPL
39342	2002 AA_{51}	—	January 9, 2002	Socorro	LINEAR	EOS ·	5.2 km	MPC · JPL
39343	2002 AV_{58}	—	January 9, 2002	Socorro	LINEAR	·	5.7 km	MPC · JPL
39344	2002 AC_{60}	—	January 9, 2002	Socorro	LINEAR	·	7.6 km	MPC · JPL
39345	2002 AU_{63}	—	January 11, 2002	Socorro	LINEAR	EUN	3.4 km	MPC · JPL
39346	2002 AT_{106}	—	January 9, 2002	Socorro	LINEAR	·	3.8 km	MPC · JPL
39347	2002 AO_{107}	—	January 9, 2002	Socorro	LINEAR	·	2.1 km	MPC · JPL
39348	2002 AE_{117}	—	January 9, 2002	Socorro	LINEAR	THM	7.0 km	MPC · JPL
39349	2002 AQ_{117}	—	January 9, 2002	Socorro	LINEAR	·	3.1 km	MPC · JPL
39350	2002 AC_{120}	—	January 9, 2002	Socorro	LINEAR	·	4.4 km	MPC · JPL
39351	2002 AB_{122}	—	January 9, 2002	Socorro	LINEAR	·	2.1 km	MPC · JPL
39352	2002 AX_{123}	—	January 9, 2002	Socorro	LINEAR	·	4.4 km	MPC · JPL
39353	2002 AR_{144}	—	January 13, 2002	Socorro	LINEAR	·	5.9 km	MPC · JPL
39354	2002 AX_{148}	—	January 11, 2002	Socorro	LINEAR	·	6.3 km	MPC · JPL
39355	2002 AH_{161}	—	January 13, 2002	Socorro	LINEAR	·	2.0 km	MPC · JPL
39356	2002 AK_{161}	—	January 13, 2002	Socorro	LINEAR	CYB	9.7 km	MPC · JPL
39357	2002 AD_{162}	—	January 13, 2002	Socorro	LINEAR	·	3.9 km	MPC · JPL
39358	2002 AL_{162}	—	January 13, 2002	Socorro	LINEAR	EOS	4.4 km	MPC · JPL
39359	2002 AD_{178}	—	January 14, 2002	Socorro	LINEAR	·	3.1 km	MPC · JPL
39360	2002 AP_{178}	—	January 14, 2002	Socorro	LINEAR	MAS	2.3 km	MPC · JPL
39361	2002 AM_{179}	—	January 14, 2002	Socorro	LINEAR	·	1.6 km	MPC · JPL
39362	2002 BU_{1}	—	January 21, 2002	Desert Eagle	W. K. Y. Yeung	L4	15 km	MPC · JPL
39363	2002 BW_{6}	—	January 18, 2002	Socorro	LINEAR	·	1.5 km	MPC · JPL
39364	2002 BN_{7}	—	January 18, 2002	Socorro	LINEAR	slow	5.2 km	MPC · JPL
39365	2002 BP_{10}	—	January 18, 2002	Socorro	LINEAR	·	2.7 km	MPC · JPL
39366	2002 BR_{10}	—	January 18, 2002	Socorro	LINEAR	NYS	2.4 km	MPC · JPL
39367	2002 BY_{16}	—	January 19, 2002	Socorro	LINEAR	·	4.8 km	MPC · JPL
39368	2002 BA_{18}	—	January 21, 2002	Socorro	LINEAR	NYS	2.2 km	MPC · JPL
39369	2002 CE_{13}	—	February 8, 2002	Fountain Hills	C. W. Juels	L4	33 km	MPC · JPL
39370	2002 CK_{22}	—	February 5, 2002	Palomar	NEAT	(12739)	3.4 km	MPC · JPL
39371	2002 CF_{49}	—	February 3, 2002	Haleakala	NEAT	EOS	4.4 km	MPC · JPL
39372 Wongtzewah	2002 CS_{51}	Wongtzewah	February 12, 2002	Desert Eagle	W. K. Y. Yeung	·	8.2 km	MPC · JPL
39373	2002 CX_{53}	—	February 7, 2002	Socorro	LINEAR	NYS	1.6 km	MPC · JPL
39374	2002 CB_{83}	—	February 7, 2002	Socorro	LINEAR	·	3.8 km	MPC · JPL
39375	2002 CW_{100}	—	February 7, 2002	Socorro	LINEAR	·	2.2 km	MPC · JPL
39376	2002 CU_{105}	—	February 7, 2002	Socorro	LINEAR	·	2.8 km	MPC · JPL
39377	2002 CO_{106}	—	February 7, 2002	Socorro	LINEAR	(5)	1.5 km	MPC · JPL
39378	2101 P-L	—	September 24, 1960	Palomar	C. J. van Houten, I. van Houten-Groeneveld, T. Gehrels	·	5.8 km	MPC · JPL
39379	2120 P-L	—	September 24, 1960	Palomar	C. J. van Houten, I. van Houten-Groeneveld, T. Gehrels	·	1.7 km	MPC · JPL
39380	2169 P-L	—	September 24, 1960	Palomar	C. J. van Houten, I. van Houten-Groeneveld, T. Gehrels	V	1.5 km	MPC · JPL
39381	2603 P-L	—	September 24, 1960	Palomar	C. J. van Houten, I. van Houten-Groeneveld, T. Gehrels	·	1.9 km	MPC · JPL
39382 Opportunity	2696 P-L	Opportunity	September 24, 1960	Palomar	C. J. van Houten, I. van Houten-Groeneveld, T. Gehrels	3:2	7.5 km	MPC · JPL
39383	2765 P-L	—	September 24, 1960	Palomar	C. J. van Houten, I. van Houten-Groeneveld, T. Gehrels	·	3.2 km	MPC · JPL
39384	2814 P-L	—	September 24, 1960	Palomar	C. J. van Houten, I. van Houten-Groeneveld, T. Gehrels	·	5.8 km	MPC · JPL
39385	4017 P-L	—	September 24, 1960	Palomar	C. J. van Houten, I. van Houten-Groeneveld, T. Gehrels	·	5.9 km	MPC · JPL
39386	4039 P-L	—	September 24, 1960	Palomar	C. J. van Houten, I. van Houten-Groeneveld, T. Gehrels	NYS	2.4 km	MPC · JPL
39387	4150 P-L	—	September 24, 1960	Palomar	C. J. van Houten, I. van Houten-Groeneveld, T. Gehrels	ADE	6.0 km	MPC · JPL
39388	4190 P-L	—	September 24, 1960	Palomar	C. J. van Houten, I. van Houten-Groeneveld, T. Gehrels	·	2.7 km	MPC · JPL
39389	4191 P-L	—	September 24, 1960	Palomar	C. J. van Houten, I. van Houten-Groeneveld, T. Gehrels	·	4.6 km	MPC · JPL
39390	4839 P-L	—	September 24, 1960	Palomar	C. J. van Houten, I. van Houten-Groeneveld, T. Gehrels	NYS ·	3.3 km	MPC · JPL
39391	4885 P-L	—	September 24, 1960	Palomar	C. J. van Houten, I. van Houten-Groeneveld, T. Gehrels	·	1.3 km	MPC · JPL
39392	4893 P-L	—	September 24, 1960	Palomar	C. J. van Houten, I. van Houten-Groeneveld, T. Gehrels	KOR	4.5 km	MPC · JPL
39393	5564 P-L	—	October 17, 1960	Palomar	C. J. van Houten, I. van Houten-Groeneveld, T. Gehrels	NYS	2.8 km	MPC · JPL
39394	6027 P-L	—	September 24, 1960	Palomar	C. J. van Houten, I. van Houten-Groeneveld, T. Gehrels	NYS	1.5 km	MPC · JPL
39395	6199 P-L	—	September 24, 1960	Palomar	C. J. van Houten, I. van Houten-Groeneveld, T. Gehrels	·	1.5 km	MPC · JPL
39396	6243 P-L	—	September 24, 1960	Palomar	C. J. van Houten, I. van Houten-Groeneveld, T. Gehrels	·	4.7 km	MPC · JPL
39397	6514 P-L	—	September 24, 1960	Palomar	C. J. van Houten, I. van Houten-Groeneveld, T. Gehrels	·	3.1 km	MPC · JPL
39398	6609 P-L	—	September 24, 1960	Palomar	C. J. van Houten, I. van Houten-Groeneveld, T. Gehrels	EUN	2.2 km	MPC · JPL
39399	6688 P-L	—	September 24, 1960	Palomar	C. J. van Houten, I. van Houten-Groeneveld, T. Gehrels	·	6.8 km	MPC · JPL
39400	6808 P-L	—	September 24, 1960	Palomar	C. J. van Houten, I. van Houten-Groeneveld, T. Gehrels	HYG	5.7 km	MPC · JPL

== 39401–39500 ==
back to top

Designation			Discovery			Properties		Ref
Permanent	Provisional	Named after	Date	Site	Discoverer(s)	Category	Diam.	Ref
39401	7572 P-L	—	September 27, 1960	Palomar	C. J. van Houten, I. van Houten-Groeneveld, T. Gehrels	·	2.1 km	MPC · JPL
39402	9074 P-L	—	October 17, 1960	Palomar	C. J. van Houten, I. van Houten-Groeneveld, T. Gehrels	·	5.9 km	MPC · JPL
39403	9514 P-L	—	October 22, 1960	Palomar	C. J. van Houten, I. van Houten-Groeneveld, T. Gehrels	KOR	3.5 km	MPC · JPL
39404	9582 P-L	—	October 17, 1960	Palomar	C. J. van Houten, I. van Houten-Groeneveld, T. Gehrels	TIR	4.3 km	MPC · JPL
39405 Mosigkau	1063 T-1	Mosigkau	March 25, 1971	Palomar	C. J. van Houten, I. van Houten-Groeneveld, T. Gehrels	3:2 · SHU	15 km	MPC · JPL
39406	1145 T-1	—	March 25, 1971	Palomar	C. J. van Houten, I. van Houten-Groeneveld, T. Gehrels	·	3.6 km	MPC · JPL
39407	1187 T-1	—	March 25, 1971	Palomar	C. J. van Houten, I. van Houten-Groeneveld, T. Gehrels	·	990 m	MPC · JPL
39408	1273 T-1	—	March 26, 1971	Palomar	C. J. van Houten, I. van Houten-Groeneveld, T. Gehrels	·	4.4 km	MPC · JPL
39409	2100 T-1	—	March 25, 1971	Palomar	C. J. van Houten, I. van Houten-Groeneveld, T. Gehrels	·	1.9 km	MPC · JPL
39410	2191 T-1	—	March 25, 1971	Palomar	C. J. van Houten, I. van Houten-Groeneveld, T. Gehrels	·	1.6 km	MPC · JPL
39411	2266 T-1	—	March 25, 1971	Palomar	C. J. van Houten, I. van Houten-Groeneveld, T. Gehrels	·	6.4 km	MPC · JPL
39412	3097 T-1	—	March 26, 1971	Palomar	C. J. van Houten, I. van Houten-Groeneveld, T. Gehrels	·	2.7 km	MPC · JPL
39413	3113 T-1	—	March 26, 1971	Palomar	C. J. van Houten, I. van Houten-Groeneveld, T. Gehrels	·	2.6 km	MPC · JPL
39414	3283 T-1	—	March 26, 1971	Palomar	C. J. van Houten, I. van Houten-Groeneveld, T. Gehrels	·	2.7 km	MPC · JPL
39415 Janeausten	4231 T-1	Janeausten	March 26, 1971	Palomar	C. J. van Houten, I. van Houten-Groeneveld, T. Gehrels	3:2	9.0 km	MPC · JPL
39416	1024 T-2	—	September 29, 1973	Palomar	C. J. van Houten, I. van Houten-Groeneveld, T. Gehrels	·	2.0 km	MPC · JPL
39417	1100 T-2	—	September 29, 1973	Palomar	C. J. van Houten, I. van Houten-Groeneveld, T. Gehrels	·	2.8 km	MPC · JPL
39418	1204 T-2	—	September 29, 1973	Palomar	C. J. van Houten, I. van Houten-Groeneveld, T. Gehrels	·	2.3 km	MPC · JPL
39419	1244 T-2	—	September 29, 1973	Palomar	C. J. van Houten, I. van Houten-Groeneveld, T. Gehrels	·	2.7 km	MPC · JPL
39420 Elizabethgaskell	2084 T-2	Elizabethgaskell	September 29, 1973	Palomar	C. J. van Houten, I. van Houten-Groeneveld, T. Gehrels	H · slow	1.8 km	MPC · JPL
39421	2128 T-2	—	September 29, 1973	Palomar	C. J. van Houten, I. van Houten-Groeneveld, T. Gehrels	·	2.7 km	MPC · JPL
39422	3109 T-2	—	September 30, 1973	Palomar	C. J. van Houten, I. van Houten-Groeneveld, T. Gehrels	EOS	3.2 km	MPC · JPL
39423	3136 T-2	—	September 30, 1973	Palomar	C. J. van Houten, I. van Houten-Groeneveld, T. Gehrels	·	3.9 km	MPC · JPL
39424	3143 T-2	—	September 30, 1973	Palomar	C. J. van Houten, I. van Houten-Groeneveld, T. Gehrels	·	2.7 km	MPC · JPL
39425	3240 T-2	—	September 30, 1973	Palomar	C. J. van Houten, I. van Houten-Groeneveld, T. Gehrels	·	4.6 km	MPC · JPL
39426	3278 T-2	—	September 30, 1973	Palomar	C. J. van Houten, I. van Houten-Groeneveld, T. Gehrels	NYS	1.7 km	MPC · JPL
39427 Charlottebrontë	3360 T-2	Charlottebrontë	September 25, 1973	Palomar	C. J. van Houten, I. van Houten-Groeneveld, T. Gehrels	3:2 · SHU	15 km	MPC · JPL
39428 Emilybrontë	4169 T-2	Emilybrontë	September 29, 1973	Palomar	C. J. van Houten, I. van Houten-Groeneveld, T. Gehrels	NYS	3.8 km	MPC · JPL
39429 Annebrontë	4223 T-2	Annebrontë	September 29, 1973	Palomar	C. J. van Houten, I. van Houten-Groeneveld, T. Gehrels	·	3.7 km	MPC · JPL
39430	4264 T-2	—	September 29, 1973	Palomar	C. J. van Houten, I. van Houten-Groeneveld, T. Gehrels	·	4.7 km	MPC · JPL
39431	5178 T-2	—	September 25, 1973	Palomar	C. J. van Houten, I. van Houten-Groeneveld, T. Gehrels	EOS	5.8 km	MPC · JPL
39432	1079 T-3	—	October 17, 1977	Palomar	C. J. van Houten, I. van Houten-Groeneveld, T. Gehrels	EUN	3.8 km	MPC · JPL
39433	1113 T-3	—	October 17, 1977	Palomar	C. J. van Houten, I. van Houten-Groeneveld, T. Gehrels	·	7.9 km	MPC · JPL
39434	1202 T-3	—	October 17, 1977	Palomar	C. J. van Houten, I. van Houten-Groeneveld, T. Gehrels	·	1.9 km	MPC · JPL
39435	2029 T-3	—	October 16, 1977	Palomar	C. J. van Houten, I. van Houten-Groeneveld, T. Gehrels	·	9.0 km	MPC · JPL
39436	2162 T-3	—	October 16, 1977	Palomar	C. J. van Houten, I. van Houten-Groeneveld, T. Gehrels	V	1.6 km	MPC · JPL
39437	2203 T-3	—	October 16, 1977	Palomar	C. J. van Houten, I. van Houten-Groeneveld, T. Gehrels	·	6.9 km	MPC · JPL
39438	2218 T-3	—	October 16, 1977	Palomar	C. J. van Houten, I. van Houten-Groeneveld, T. Gehrels	·	2.4 km	MPC · JPL
39439	2242 T-3	—	October 16, 1977	Palomar	C. J. van Houten, I. van Houten-Groeneveld, T. Gehrels	·	7.2 km	MPC · JPL
39440	2282 T-3	—	October 16, 1977	Palomar	C. J. van Houten, I. van Houten-Groeneveld, T. Gehrels	·	2.3 km	MPC · JPL
39441	2293 T-3	—	October 16, 1977	Palomar	C. J. van Houten, I. van Houten-Groeneveld, T. Gehrels	·	6.1 km	MPC · JPL
39442	2384 T-3	—	October 16, 1977	Palomar	C. J. van Houten, I. van Houten-Groeneveld, T. Gehrels	·	2.0 km	MPC · JPL
39443	2394 T-3	—	October 16, 1977	Palomar	C. J. van Houten, I. van Houten-Groeneveld, T. Gehrels	·	10 km	MPC · JPL
39444	3264 T-3	—	October 16, 1977	Palomar	C. J. van Houten, I. van Houten-Groeneveld, T. Gehrels	THM	4.6 km	MPC · JPL
39445	3336 T-3	—	October 16, 1977	Palomar	C. J. van Houten, I. van Houten-Groeneveld, T. Gehrels	·	1.4 km	MPC · JPL
39446	3348 T-3	—	October 16, 1977	Palomar	C. J. van Houten, I. van Houten-Groeneveld, T. Gehrels	·	7.8 km	MPC · JPL
39447	3412 T-3	—	October 16, 1977	Palomar	C. J. van Houten, I. van Houten-Groeneveld, T. Gehrels	slow	3.2 km	MPC · JPL
39448	3455 T-3	—	October 16, 1977	Palomar	C. J. van Houten, I. van Houten-Groeneveld, T. Gehrels	·	3.8 km	MPC · JPL
39449	3486 T-3	—	October 16, 1977	Palomar	C. J. van Houten, I. van Houten-Groeneveld, T. Gehrels	THM	4.2 km	MPC · JPL
39450	3552 T-3	—	October 16, 1977	Palomar	C. J. van Houten, I. van Houten-Groeneveld, T. Gehrels	THM	5.1 km	MPC · JPL
39451	3992 T-3	—	October 16, 1977	Palomar	C. J. van Houten, I. van Houten-Groeneveld, T. Gehrels	NYS	4.5 km	MPC · JPL
39452	4027 T-3	—	October 16, 1977	Palomar	C. J. van Houten, I. van Houten-Groeneveld, T. Gehrels	·	1.5 km	MPC · JPL
39453	4070 T-3	—	October 16, 1977	Palomar	C. J. van Houten, I. van Houten-Groeneveld, T. Gehrels	·	10 km	MPC · JPL
39454	4082 T-3	—	October 16, 1977	Palomar	C. J. van Houten, I. van Houten-Groeneveld, T. Gehrels	EUN	3.5 km	MPC · JPL
39455	4091 T-3	—	October 16, 1977	Palomar	C. J. van Houten, I. van Houten-Groeneveld, T. Gehrels	·	7.6 km	MPC · JPL
39456	4120 T-3	—	October 16, 1977	Palomar	C. J. van Houten, I. van Houten-Groeneveld, T. Gehrels	·	4.6 km	MPC · JPL
39457	4167 T-3	—	October 16, 1977	Palomar	C. J. van Houten, I. van Houten-Groeneveld, T. Gehrels	·	2.4 km	MPC · JPL
39458	4198 T-3	—	October 16, 1977	Palomar	C. J. van Houten, I. van Houten-Groeneveld, T. Gehrels	fast	11 km	MPC · JPL
39459	4266 T-3	—	October 16, 1977	Palomar	C. J. van Houten, I. van Houten-Groeneveld, T. Gehrels	·	15 km	MPC · JPL
39460	4332 T-3	—	October 16, 1977	Palomar	C. J. van Houten, I. van Houten-Groeneveld, T. Gehrels	TIR	6.2 km	MPC · JPL
39461	5019 T-3	—	October 16, 1977	Palomar	C. J. van Houten, I. van Houten-Groeneveld, T. Gehrels	·	8.9 km	MPC · JPL
39462	5175 T-3	—	October 16, 1977	Palomar	C. J. van Houten, I. van Houten-Groeneveld, T. Gehrels	·	5.3 km	MPC · JPL
39463 Phyleus	1973 SZ	Phyleus	September 19, 1973	Palomar	C. J. van Houten, I. van Houten-Groeneveld, T. Gehrels	L4	13 km	MPC · JPL
39464 Pöppelmann	1973 UO_{5}	Pöppelmann	October 27, 1973	Tautenburg Observatory	F. Börngen	MAS	2.1 km	MPC · JPL
39465	1978 RW_{6}	—	September 2, 1978	La Silla	C.-I. Lagerkvist	·	2.4 km	MPC · JPL
39466	1978 RX_{6}	—	September 2, 1978	La Silla	C.-I. Lagerkvist	·	1.6 km	MPC · JPL
39467	1978 RA_{7}	—	September 2, 1978	La Silla	C.-I. Lagerkvist	·	2.1 km	MPC · JPL
39468	1978 RY_{7}	—	September 2, 1978	La Silla	C.-I. Lagerkvist	V	1.7 km	MPC · JPL
39469	1978 RG_{9}	—	September 2, 1978	La Silla	C.-I. Lagerkvist	·	3.5 km	MPC · JPL
39470	1978 UB_{7}	—	October 27, 1978	Palomar	C. M. Olmstead	·	3.6 km	MPC · JPL
39471	1978 UF_{8}	—	October 27, 1978	Palomar	C. M. Olmstead	·	2.1 km	MPC · JPL
39472	1978 VJ_{3}	—	November 7, 1978	Palomar	E. F. Helin, S. J. Bus	EOS	5.0 km	MPC · JPL
39473	1978 VW_{3}	—	November 6, 1978	Palomar	E. F. Helin, S. J. Bus	·	3.5 km	MPC · JPL
39474	1978 VC_{7}	—	November 7, 1978	Palomar	E. F. Helin, S. J. Bus	L5	26 km	MPC · JPL
39475	1978 VE_{8}	—	November 7, 1978	Palomar	E. F. Helin, S. J. Bus	·	3.7 km	MPC · JPL
39476	1979 MA_{2}	—	June 25, 1979	Siding Spring	E. F. Helin, S. J. Bus	·	1.8 km	MPC · JPL
39477	1979 MF_{5}	—	June 25, 1979	Siding Spring	E. F. Helin, S. J. Bus	·	5.2 km	MPC · JPL
39478	1980 FR_{4}	—	March 16, 1980	La Silla	C.-I. Lagerkvist	·	2.7 km	MPC · JPL
39479	1980 UQ_{1}	—	October 31, 1980	Palomar	S. J. Bus	·	2.6 km	MPC · JPL
39480	1981 DU	—	February 28, 1981	Siding Spring	S. J. Bus	·	3.1 km	MPC · JPL
39481	1981 DP_{1}	—	February 28, 1981	Siding Spring	S. J. Bus	V	1.9 km	MPC · JPL
39482	1981 DD_{2}	—	February 28, 1981	Siding Spring	S. J. Bus	EMA	7.6 km	MPC · JPL
39483	1981 DW_{2}	—	February 28, 1981	Siding Spring	S. J. Bus	·	1.6 km	MPC · JPL
39484	1981 DP_{3}	—	February 28, 1981	Siding Spring	S. J. Bus	EOS	4.4 km	MPC · JPL
39485	1981 EO_{3}	—	March 2, 1981	Siding Spring	S. J. Bus	·	6.5 km	MPC · JPL
39486	1981 ET_{5}	—	March 7, 1981	Siding Spring	S. J. Bus	·	7.0 km	MPC · JPL
39487	1981 EC_{6}	—	March 7, 1981	Siding Spring	S. J. Bus	slow	4.7 km	MPC · JPL
39488	1981 EM_{6}	—	March 6, 1981	Siding Spring	S. J. Bus	MAR	2.9 km	MPC · JPL
39489	1981 EU_{6}	—	March 6, 1981	Siding Spring	S. J. Bus	·	3.2 km	MPC · JPL
39490	1981 EQ_{7}	—	March 1, 1981	Siding Spring	S. J. Bus	·	4.4 km	MPC · JPL
39491	1981 EW_{8}	—	March 1, 1981	Siding Spring	S. J. Bus	(5)	3.1 km	MPC · JPL
39492	1981 EO_{10}	—	March 1, 1981	Siding Spring	S. J. Bus	·	3.4 km	MPC · JPL
39493	1981 EV_{10}	—	March 1, 1981	Siding Spring	S. J. Bus	·	1.6 km	MPC · JPL
39494	1981 EM_{11}	—	March 7, 1981	Siding Spring	S. J. Bus	V	1.8 km	MPC · JPL
39495	1981 EP_{11}	—	March 7, 1981	Siding Spring	S. J. Bus	·	2.4 km	MPC · JPL
39496	1981 EM_{14}	—	March 1, 1981	Siding Spring	S. J. Bus	·	5.0 km	MPC · JPL
39497	1981 EB_{18}	—	March 2, 1981	Siding Spring	S. J. Bus	·	2.0 km	MPC · JPL
39498	1981 EH_{25}	—	March 2, 1981	Siding Spring	S. J. Bus	·	2.0 km	MPC · JPL
39499	1981 EJ_{29}	—	March 1, 1981	Siding Spring	S. J. Bus	EOS	5.6 km	MPC · JPL
39500	1981 EK_{30}	—	March 2, 1981	Siding Spring	S. J. Bus	V	1.4 km	MPC · JPL

== 39501–39600 ==
back to top

Designation			Discovery			Properties		Ref
Permanent	Provisional	Named after	Date	Site	Discoverer(s)	Category	Diam.	Ref
39501	1981 EV_{31}	—	March 2, 1981	Siding Spring	F. Dossin	(2076)	2.2 km	MPC · JPL
39502	1981 EE_{36}	—	March 6, 1981	Siding Spring	S. J. Bus	·	5.0 km	MPC · JPL
39503	1981 EC_{38}	—	March 1, 1981	Siding Spring	S. J. Bus	·	2.0 km	MPC · JPL
39504	1981 EZ_{39}	—	March 2, 1981	Siding Spring	S. J. Bus	·	2.1 km	MPC · JPL
39505	1981 EX_{40}	—	March 2, 1981	Siding Spring	S. J. Bus	·	4.7 km	MPC · JPL
39506	1981 EO_{44}	—	March 7, 1981	Siding Spring	S. J. Bus	·	1.6 km	MPC · JPL
39507	1981 EC_{45}	—	March 7, 1981	Siding Spring	S. J. Bus	·	4.1 km	MPC · JPL
39508	1981 EW_{46}	—	March 2, 1981	Siding Spring	S. J. Bus	·	3.7 km	MPC · JPL
39509 Kardashev	1981 US_{11}	Kardashev	October 22, 1981	Nauchnij	N. S. Chernykh	DOR	7.7 km	MPC · JPL
39510	1982 DU	—	February 21, 1982	Anderson Mesa	E. Bowell	·	17 km	MPC · JPL
39511	1985 SH_{1}	—	September 18, 1985	La Silla	H. Debehogne	NYS ·	5.1 km	MPC · JPL
39512	1985 TA_{1}	—	October 15, 1985	Anderson Mesa	E. Bowell	NYS	2.3 km	MPC · JPL
39513	1986 QE_{1}	—	August 26, 1986	La Silla	H. Debehogne	·	2.9 km	MPC · JPL
39514	1986 TV_{3}	—	October 4, 1986	Kleť	A. Mrkos	·	2.8 km	MPC · JPL
39515	1986 XD_{5}	—	December 4, 1986	Kleť	A. Mrkos	·	4.9 km	MPC · JPL
39516 Lusigny	1987 OO	Lusigny	July 27, 1987	Haute Provence	E. W. Elst	·	3.7 km	MPC · JPL
39517	1988 CV_{2}	—	February 11, 1988	La Silla	E. W. Elst	·	2.5 km	MPC · JPL
39518	1988 CS_{4}	—	February 13, 1988	La Silla	E. W. Elst	·	9.8 km	MPC · JPL
39519	1988 CQ_{5}	—	February 13, 1988	La Silla	E. W. Elst	·	2.1 km	MPC · JPL
39520	1988 NY	—	July 12, 1988	Palomar	E. F. Helin	PHO	3.7 km	MPC · JPL
39521	1988 PQ	—	August 11, 1988	Siding Spring	Noymer, A. J.	·	1.8 km	MPC · JPL
39522	1988 RA_{12}	—	September 14, 1988	Cerro Tololo	S. J. Bus	·	4.2 km	MPC · JPL
39523	1989 ST_{2}	—	September 26, 1989	La Silla	E. W. Elst	·	4.7 km	MPC · JPL
39524	1989 SM_{3}	—	September 26, 1989	La Silla	E. W. Elst	DOR	6.3 km	MPC · JPL
39525	1989 TR_{2}	—	October 3, 1989	Cerro Tololo	S. J. Bus	·	9.3 km	MPC · JPL
39526	1989 TW_{3}	—	October 7, 1989	La Silla	E. W. Elst	·	2.3 km	MPC · JPL
39527	1989 TO_{5}	—	October 7, 1989	La Silla	E. W. Elst	·	2.3 km	MPC · JPL
39528	1989 TB_{16}	—	October 4, 1989	La Silla	H. Debehogne	·	1.9 km	MPC · JPL
39529 Vatnajökull	1989 VJ_{1}	Vatnajökull	November 3, 1989	La Silla	E. W. Elst	·	1.8 km	MPC · JPL
39530	1990 EX_{1}	—	March 2, 1990	La Silla	E. W. Elst	·	9.4 km	MPC · JPL
39531	1990 ER_{2}	—	March 2, 1990	La Silla	E. W. Elst	·	3.0 km	MPC · JPL
39532	1990 HZ_{1}	—	April 27, 1990	Siding Spring	R. H. McNaught	·	11 km	MPC · JPL
39533	1990 QD_{3}	—	August 28, 1990	Palomar	H. E. Holt	·	2.0 km	MPC · JPL
39534	1990 RK_{1}	—	September 14, 1990	Palomar	H. E. Holt	EUN ·	8.3 km	MPC · JPL
39535	1990 RX_{7}	—	September 14, 1990	La Silla	H. Debehogne	slow	6.5 km	MPC · JPL
39536 Lenhof	1990 TA_{11}	Lenhof	October 10, 1990	Tautenburg Observatory	L. D. Schmadel, F. Börngen	·	1.7 km	MPC · JPL
39537	1990 VV_{2}	—	November 12, 1990	Yorii	M. Arai, H. Mori	GEF	5.9 km	MPC · JPL
39538	1991 FD_{2}	—	March 20, 1991	La Silla	H. Debehogne	NYS	2.6 km	MPC · JPL
39539 Emmadesmet	1991 GU_{4}	Emmadesmet	April 8, 1991	La Silla	E. W. Elst	EMA	10 km	MPC · JPL
39540 Borchert	1991 GF_{11}	Borchert	April 11, 1991	Tautenburg Observatory	F. Börngen	·	2.7 km	MPC · JPL
39541	1991 LA	—	June 3, 1991	Kitt Peak	Spacewatch	·	1.3 km	MPC · JPL
39542	1991 PO_{3}	—	August 2, 1991	La Silla	E. W. Elst	·	2.8 km	MPC · JPL
39543 Aubriet	1991 PX_{7}	Aubriet	August 6, 1991	La Silla	E. W. Elst	·	7.8 km	MPC · JPL
39544	1991 TN_{14}	—	October 7, 1991	Palomar	C. P. de Saint-Aignan	·	3.6 km	MPC · JPL
39545	1992 DH_{3}	—	February 25, 1992	Kitt Peak	Spacewatch	·	6.2 km	MPC · JPL
39546	1992 DT_{5}	—	February 29, 1992	La Silla	UESAC	HOF · slow	7.1 km	MPC · JPL
39547	1992 DE_{7}	—	February 29, 1992	La Silla	UESAC	·	3.9 km	MPC · JPL
39548	1992 DA_{8}	—	February 29, 1992	La Silla	UESAC	AGN	3.5 km	MPC · JPL
39549 Casals	1992 DP_{13}	Casals	February 27, 1992	Tautenburg Observatory	F. Börngen	·	6.7 km	MPC · JPL
39550	1992 ES_{4}	—	March 1, 1992	La Silla	UESAC	·	5.3 km	MPC · JPL
39551	1992 EW_{5}	—	March 2, 1992	La Silla	UESAC	·	2.8 km	MPC · JPL
39552	1992 EY_{7}	—	March 2, 1992	La Silla	UESAC	·	5.0 km	MPC · JPL
39553	1992 EO_{12}	—	March 6, 1992	La Silla	UESAC	AGN	3.8 km	MPC · JPL
39554	1992 EW_{19}	—	March 1, 1992	La Silla	UESAC	HOF	8.4 km	MPC · JPL
39555	1992 EY_{32}	—	March 2, 1992	La Silla	UESAC	ADE	5.6 km	MPC · JPL
39556	1992 GF_{2}	—	April 4, 1992	La Silla	E. W. Elst	·	3.1 km	MPC · JPL
39557 Gielgud	1992 JG	Gielgud	May 2, 1992	Kitt Peak	Spacewatch	AMO +1km	1.4 km	MPC · JPL
39558 Kishine	1992 KC	Kishine	May 24, 1992	Geisei	T. Seki	·	3.0 km	MPC · JPL
39559	1992 OL_{8}	—	July 22, 1992	La Silla	H. Debehogne, Á. López-G.	NYS	2.0 km	MPC · JPL
39560	1992 PM_{2}	—	August 2, 1992	Palomar	H. E. Holt	(2076)	2.8 km	MPC · JPL
39561	1992 QA	—	August 19, 1992	Siding Spring	R. H. McNaught	H	2.0 km	MPC · JPL
39562	1992 QK	—	August 25, 1992	Kiyosato	S. Otomo	·	3.7 km	MPC · JPL
39563	1992 RB	—	September 2, 1992	Siding Spring	R. H. McNaught	H	1.6 km	MPC · JPL
39564 Tarsia	1992 RT_{5}	Tarsia	September 2, 1992	La Silla	E. W. Elst	·	2.2 km	MPC · JPL
39565	1992 SL	—	September 24, 1992	Palomar	E. F. Helin, K. J. Lawrence	AMO	720 m	MPC · JPL
39566 Carllewis	1992 SQ_{1}	Carllewis	September 26, 1992	Geisei	T. Seki	·	2.8 km	MPC · JPL
39567	1992 ST_{2}	—	September 22, 1992	Palomar	E. F. Helin	PHO	7.9 km	MPC · JPL
39568	1992 SM_{3}	—	September 24, 1992	Kitt Peak	Spacewatch	·	2.6 km	MPC · JPL
39569	1992 SV_{3}	—	September 24, 1992	Kitt Peak	Spacewatch	·	2.8 km	MPC · JPL
39570	1992 SV_{11}	—	September 28, 1992	Kitt Peak	Spacewatch	·	3.5 km	MPC · JPL
39571 Pückler	1992 SN_{24}	Pückler	September 21, 1992	Tautenburg Observatory	F. Börngen	V	2.0 km	MPC · JPL
39572	1993 DQ_{1}	—	February 26, 1993	Kitt Peak	Spacewatch	AMO +1km · PHA	1.6 km	MPC · JPL
39573	1993 FO_{4}	—	March 17, 1993	La Silla	UESAC	·	5.2 km	MPC · JPL
39574	1993 FM_{5}	—	March 17, 1993	La Silla	UESAC	·	6.2 km	MPC · JPL
39575	1993 FR_{5}	—	March 17, 1993	La Silla	UESAC	·	3.0 km	MPC · JPL
39576	1993 FO_{11}	—	March 17, 1993	La Silla	UESAC	·	3.5 km	MPC · JPL
39577	1993 FV_{12}	—	March 17, 1993	La Silla	UESAC	JUN	1.9 km	MPC · JPL
39578	1993 FV_{13}	—	March 17, 1993	La Silla	UESAC	·	5.0 km	MPC · JPL
39579	1993 FD_{16}	—	March 17, 1993	La Silla	UESAC	·	7.4 km	MPC · JPL
39580	1993 FF_{20}	—	March 17, 1993	La Silla	UESAC	·	2.4 km	MPC · JPL
39581	1993 FQ_{21}	—	March 21, 1993	La Silla	UESAC	·	3.3 km	MPC · JPL
39582	1993 FR_{21}	—	March 21, 1993	La Silla	UESAC	·	4.7 km	MPC · JPL
39583	1993 FN_{23}	—	March 21, 1993	La Silla	UESAC	·	4.8 km	MPC · JPL
39584	1993 FO_{23}	—	March 21, 1993	La Silla	UESAC	EUN	4.3 km	MPC · JPL
39585	1993 FJ_{26}	—	March 21, 1993	La Silla	UESAC	·	6.6 km	MPC · JPL
39586	1993 FW_{27}	—	March 21, 1993	La Silla	UESAC	·	3.9 km	MPC · JPL
39587	1993 FF_{30}	—	March 21, 1993	La Silla	UESAC	NEM	4.1 km	MPC · JPL
39588	1993 FZ_{37}	—	March 19, 1993	La Silla	UESAC	·	4.6 km	MPC · JPL
39589	1993 FL_{75}	—	March 21, 1993	La Silla	UESAC	·	3.9 km	MPC · JPL
39590	1993 FG_{76}	—	March 21, 1993	La Silla	UESAC	·	4.7 km	MPC · JPL
39591	1993 LR_{1}	—	June 15, 1993	Siding Spring	R. H. McNaught	·	4.6 km	MPC · JPL
39592	1993 OD_{6}	—	July 20, 1993	La Silla	E. W. Elst	·	3.1 km	MPC · JPL
39593	1993 OM_{10}	—	July 20, 1993	La Silla	E. W. Elst	THM	4.9 km	MPC · JPL
39594	1993 PP_{7}	—	August 15, 1993	Caussols	E. W. Elst	·	2.2 km	MPC · JPL
39595	1993 QP_{6}	—	August 20, 1993	La Silla	E. W. Elst	·	3.9 km	MPC · JPL
39596	1993 QZ_{8}	—	August 20, 1993	La Silla	E. W. Elst	slow	2.0 km	MPC · JPL
39597	1993 RP_{6}	—	September 15, 1993	La Silla	E. W. Elst	·	2.5 km	MPC · JPL
39598	1993 RG_{13}	—	September 14, 1993	La Silla	H. Debehogne, E. W. Elst	EOS	4.4 km	MPC · JPL
39599	1993 SC_{6}	—	September 17, 1993	La Silla	E. W. Elst	·	1.8 km	MPC · JPL
39600	1993 TX_{15}	—	October 9, 1993	La Silla	E. W. Elst	·	3.1 km	MPC · JPL

== 39601–39700 ==
back to top

Designation			Discovery			Properties		Ref
Permanent	Provisional	Named after	Date	Site	Discoverer(s)	Category	Diam.	Ref
39601	1993 TG_{18}	—	October 9, 1993	La Silla	E. W. Elst	·	7.3 km	MPC · JPL
39602	1993 TH_{20}	—	October 9, 1993	La Silla	E. W. Elst	·	6.5 km	MPC · JPL
39603	1993 TU_{20}	—	October 9, 1993	La Silla	E. W. Elst	·	3.0 km	MPC · JPL
39604	1993 TM_{23}	—	October 9, 1993	La Silla	E. W. Elst	BAP	3.3 km	MPC · JPL
39605	1993 TX_{23}	—	October 9, 1993	La Silla	E. W. Elst	·	5.6 km	MPC · JPL
39606	1993 TL_{24}	—	October 9, 1993	La Silla	E. W. Elst	URS	10 km	MPC · JPL
39607	1993 TF_{30}	—	October 9, 1993	La Silla	E. W. Elst	·	12 km	MPC · JPL
39608	1993 TQ_{32}	—	October 9, 1993	La Silla	E. W. Elst	·	5.9 km	MPC · JPL
39609	1993 TN_{34}	—	October 9, 1993	La Silla	E. W. Elst	·	2.9 km	MPC · JPL
39610	1993 TD_{38}	—	October 9, 1993	La Silla	E. W. Elst	·	2.5 km	MPC · JPL
39611	1993 UO_{8}	—	October 20, 1993	La Silla	E. W. Elst	·	2.4 km	MPC · JPL
39612	1993 XE_{1}	—	December 5, 1993	Nyukasa	M. Hirasawa, S. Suzuki	PHO	3.0 km	MPC · JPL
39613	1993 XF_{1}	—	December 14, 1993	Oizumi	T. Kobayashi	·	1.5 km	MPC · JPL
39614	1993 YK	—	December 17, 1993	Oizumi	T. Kobayashi	·	2.5 km	MPC · JPL
39615	1994 AU	—	January 4, 1994	Oizumi	T. Kobayashi	NYS	3.1 km	MPC · JPL
39616	1994 AA_{4}	—	January 4, 1994	Kitt Peak	Spacewatch	·	3.2 km	MPC · JPL
39617	1994 CZ_{11}	—	February 7, 1994	La Silla	E. W. Elst	NYS	4.9 km	MPC · JPL
39618	1994 LT	—	June 12, 1994	Siding Spring	R. H. McNaught	H · slow	1.9 km	MPC · JPL
39619	1994 LC_{3}	—	June 10, 1994	Palomar	E. F. Helin	·	6.3 km	MPC · JPL
39620	1994 PE_{2}	—	August 9, 1994	Palomar	PCAS	·	5.6 km	MPC · JPL
39621	1994 PU_{4}	—	August 10, 1994	La Silla	E. W. Elst	·	4.1 km	MPC · JPL
39622	1994 PJ_{5}	—	August 10, 1994	La Silla	E. W. Elst	·	7.3 km	MPC · JPL
39623	1994 PJ_{7}	—	August 10, 1994	La Silla	E. W. Elst	·	5.8 km	MPC · JPL
39624	1994 PT_{8}	—	August 10, 1994	La Silla	E. W. Elst	·	4.2 km	MPC · JPL
39625	1994 PV_{9}	—	August 10, 1994	La Silla	E. W. Elst	·	4.7 km	MPC · JPL
39626	1994 PV_{18}	—	August 12, 1994	La Silla	E. W. Elst	·	5.5 km	MPC · JPL
39627	1994 PX_{21}	—	August 12, 1994	La Silla	E. W. Elst	·	4.6 km	MPC · JPL
39628	1994 PJ_{24}	—	August 12, 1994	La Silla	E. W. Elst	HOF	6.6 km	MPC · JPL
39629	1994 PG_{26}	—	August 12, 1994	La Silla	E. W. Elst	·	5.9 km	MPC · JPL
39630	1994 PQ_{39}	—	August 10, 1994	La Silla	E. W. Elst	GEF	4.3 km	MPC · JPL
39631	1994 SZ_{9}	—	September 28, 1994	Kitt Peak	Spacewatch	·	3.3 km	MPC · JPL
39632	1994 UL	—	October 31, 1994	Oizumi	T. Kobayashi	·	4.6 km	MPC · JPL
39633	1994 WO	—	November 25, 1994	Oizumi	T. Kobayashi	·	6.2 km	MPC · JPL
39634	1994 WM_{2}	—	November 28, 1994	Kushiro	S. Ueda, H. Kaneda	·	5.6 km	MPC · JPL
39635 Kusatao	1994 YL	Kusatao	December 27, 1994	Kuma Kogen	A. Nakamura	·	7.8 km	MPC · JPL
39636	1995 BQ_{2}	—	January 29, 1995	Siding Spring	R. H. McNaught	EUP	10 km	MPC · JPL
39637	1995 EG	—	March 1, 1995	Ojima	T. Niijima, T. Urata	·	2.0 km	MPC · JPL
39638	1995 EB_{5}	—	March 2, 1995	Kitt Peak	Spacewatch	·	3.5 km	MPC · JPL
39639	1995 FN_{6}	—	March 23, 1995	Kitt Peak	Spacewatch	·	2.0 km	MPC · JPL
39640	1995 GB_{7}	—	April 4, 1995	Xinglong	SCAP	·	2.3 km	MPC · JPL
39641 Pézy	1995 KM_{1}	Pézy	May 29, 1995	Stroncone	A. Vagnozzi	·	2.4 km	MPC · JPL
39642	1995 KO_{1}	—	May 26, 1995	Catalina Station	C. W. Hergenrother	PHO	2.6 km	MPC · JPL
39643	1995 KK_{4}	—	May 26, 1995	Kitt Peak	Spacewatch	·	2.8 km	MPC · JPL
39644	1995 OE_{7}	—	July 24, 1995	Kitt Peak	Spacewatch	·	4.1 km	MPC · JPL
39645 Davelharris	1995 QC_{10}	Davelharris	August 31, 1995	Socorro	R. Weber	V	1.5 km	MPC · JPL
39646	1995 SK_{4}	—	September 26, 1995	Catalina Station	T. B. Spahr	PAL	5.4 km	MPC · JPL
39647	1995 SV_{6}	—	September 17, 1995	Kitt Peak	Spacewatch	·	2.4 km	MPC · JPL
39648	1995 SY_{14}	—	September 18, 1995	Kitt Peak	Spacewatch	·	2.2 km	MPC · JPL
39649	1995 SM_{15}	—	September 18, 1995	Kitt Peak	Spacewatch	·	4.6 km	MPC · JPL
39650	1995 SD_{44}	—	September 25, 1995	Kitt Peak	Spacewatch	·	2.7 km	MPC · JPL
39651	1995 SU_{73}	—	September 29, 1995	Kitt Peak	Spacewatch	·	7.7 km	MPC · JPL
39652	1995 TY_{4}	—	October 15, 1995	Kitt Peak	Spacewatch	·	2.7 km	MPC · JPL
39653 Carnera	1995 UC	Carnera	October 17, 1995	Sormano	P. Sicoli, Ghezzi, P.	·	6.4 km	MPC · JPL
39654	1995 UP	—	October 19, 1995	Sormano	Giuliani, V., A. Testa	·	2.9 km	MPC · JPL
39655 Muneharuasada	1995 UM_{3}	Muneharuasada	October 17, 1995	Nanyo	T. Okuni	·	2.9 km	MPC · JPL
39656	1995 US_{11}	—	October 17, 1995	Kitt Peak	Spacewatch	·	6.2 km	MPC · JPL
39657	1995 UX_{22}	—	October 19, 1995	Kitt Peak	Spacewatch	·	3.5 km	MPC · JPL
39658	1995 UF_{24}	—	October 19, 1995	Kitt Peak	Spacewatch	·	3.1 km	MPC · JPL
39659	1995 UO_{44}	—	October 26, 1995	Nyukasa	M. Hirasawa, S. Suzuki	MAR	3.8 km	MPC · JPL
39660	1995 UU_{46}	—	October 20, 1995	Caussols	E. W. Elst	·	4.0 km	MPC · JPL
39661	1995 UT_{62}	—	October 25, 1995	Kitt Peak	Spacewatch	·	2.4 km	MPC · JPL
39662	1995 VR_{3}	—	November 14, 1995	Kitt Peak	Spacewatch	·	2.6 km	MPC · JPL
39663	1995 WM_{1}	—	November 16, 1995	Church Stretton	S. P. Laurie	EUN	2.6 km	MPC · JPL
39664	1995 WW_{4}	—	November 20, 1995	Ojima	T. Niijima, T. Urata	·	3.5 km	MPC · JPL
39665	1995 WU_{6}	—	November 16, 1995	Kushiro	S. Ueda, H. Kaneda	H	1.6 km	MPC · JPL
39666	1995 WL_{33}	—	November 20, 1995	Kitt Peak	Spacewatch	·	6.4 km	MPC · JPL
39667	1995 YU_{2}	—	December 22, 1995	Oohira	T. Urata	·	2.9 km	MPC · JPL
39668	1995 YR_{5}	—	December 16, 1995	Kitt Peak	Spacewatch	PAD	3.4 km	MPC · JPL
39669	1995 YN_{11}	—	December 18, 1995	Kitt Peak	Spacewatch	·	4.3 km	MPC · JPL
39670	1995 YL_{25}	—	December 22, 1995	Kitt Peak	Spacewatch	·	3.2 km	MPC · JPL
39671	1996 AG	—	January 7, 1996	Haleakala	AMOS	·	8.4 km	MPC · JPL
39672	1996 BF_{1}	—	January 22, 1996	Cloudcroft	W. Offutt	·	7.0 km	MPC · JPL
39673	1996 BN_{3}	—	January 27, 1996	Oizumi	T. Kobayashi	EOS	6.6 km	MPC · JPL
39674	1996 BA_{5}	—	January 16, 1996	Kitt Peak	Spacewatch	·	7.0 km	MPC · JPL
39675	1996 BL_{15}	—	January 19, 1996	Kitt Peak	Spacewatch	·	4.9 km	MPC · JPL
39676	1996 DQ_{1}	—	February 20, 1996	Church Stretton	S. P. Laurie	·	11 km	MPC · JPL
39677 Anagaribaldi	1996 EG	Anagaribaldi	March 13, 1996	Stroncone	Santa Lucia	VER	10 km	MPC · JPL
39678 Ammannito	1996 LQ_{1}	Ammannito	June 12, 1996	San Marcello	A. Boattini, L. Tesi	·	1.4 km	MPC · JPL
39679 Nukuhiyama	1996 OD_{3}	Nukuhiyama	July 19, 1996	Nanyo	T. Okuni	·	2.3 km	MPC · JPL
39680	1996 PK_{2}	—	August 9, 1996	Haleakala	NEAT	·	4.2 km	MPC · JPL
39681	1996 PE_{3}	—	August 15, 1996	Haleakala	NEAT	PHO	2.6 km	MPC · JPL
39682	1996 PZ_{5}	—	August 10, 1996	Haleakala	NEAT	·	2.9 km	MPC · JPL
39683	1996 PO_{6}	—	August 12, 1996	Haleakala	NEAT	·	2.5 km	MPC · JPL
39684	1996 PD_{8}	—	August 8, 1996	La Silla	E. W. Elst	KOR	4.5 km	MPC · JPL
39685	1996 PO_{8}	—	August 8, 1996	La Silla	E. W. Elst	·	2.5 km	MPC · JPL
39686 Takeshihara	1996 PT_{9}	Takeshihara	August 9, 1996	Nanyo	T. Okuni	HOF	10 km	MPC · JPL
39687	1996 RL_{3}	—	September 15, 1996	Prescott	P. G. Comba	slow?	2.7 km	MPC · JPL
39688	1996 RG_{5}	—	September 3, 1996	Nachi-Katsuura	Shiozawa, H., T. Urata	·	3.4 km	MPC · JPL
39689	1996 RK_{11}	—	September 8, 1996	Kitt Peak	Spacewatch	MAS	1.6 km	MPC · JPL
39690	1996 RJ_{26}	—	September 14, 1996	Haleakala	NEAT	·	1.4 km	MPC · JPL
39691	1996 RR_{31}	—	September 13, 1996	La Silla	Uppsala-DLR Trojan Survey	L4	12 km	MPC · JPL
39692	1996 RB_{32}	—	September 14, 1996	La Silla	Uppsala-DLR Trojan Survey	L4	13 km	MPC · JPL
39693	1996 ST_{1}	—	September 17, 1996	Kitt Peak	Spacewatch	L4	15 km	MPC · JPL
39694	1996 ST_{2}	—	September 19, 1996	Kitt Peak	Spacewatch	·	3.6 km	MPC · JPL
39695	1996 SJ_{6}	—	September 18, 1996	Xinglong	SCAP	V	1.9 km	MPC · JPL
39696	1996 TO_{1}	—	October 7, 1996	Needville	Dillon, W. G., Rivich, K.	(5)	3.0 km	MPC · JPL
39697	1996 TH_{5}	—	October 9, 1996	Prescott	P. G. Comba	NYS	2.5 km	MPC · JPL
39698	1996 TX_{7}	—	October 4, 1996	Farra d'Isonzo	Farra d'Isonzo	·	2.1 km	MPC · JPL
39699 Ernestocorte	1996 TF_{8}	Ernestocorte	October 12, 1996	Pianoro	V. Goretti	NYS	2.9 km	MPC · JPL
39700	1996 TO_{9}	—	October 12, 1996	Lake Clear	Williams, K. A.	HNS	3.0 km	MPC · JPL

== 39701–39800 ==
back to top

Designation			Discovery			Properties		Ref
Permanent	Provisional	Named after	Date	Site	Discoverer(s)	Category	Diam.	Ref
39701	1996 TF_{10}	—	October 9, 1996	Kushiro	S. Ueda, H. Kaneda	·	3.7 km	MPC · JPL
39702	1996 TZ_{10}	—	October 9, 1996	Kushiro	S. Ueda, H. Kaneda	·	3.1 km	MPC · JPL
39703 Reina	1996 TD_{13}	Reina	October 14, 1996	Kitami	K. Endate, K. Watanabe	·	4.7 km	MPC · JPL
39704	1996 TG_{15}	—	October 9, 1996	Kushiro	S. Ueda, H. Kaneda	NYS	3.6 km	MPC · JPL
39705	1996 TO_{18}	—	October 4, 1996	Kitt Peak	Spacewatch	slow	2.6 km	MPC · JPL
39706	1996 TS_{31}	—	October 9, 1996	Kitt Peak	Spacewatch	·	3.2 km	MPC · JPL
39707	1996 TN_{35}	—	October 11, 1996	Kitt Peak	Spacewatch	·	3.8 km	MPC · JPL
39708	1996 TH_{46}	—	October 10, 1996	Kitt Peak	Spacewatch	V	1.6 km	MPC · JPL
39709	1996 TH_{48}	—	October 9, 1996	Kushiro	S. Ueda, H. Kaneda	NYS ·	4.2 km	MPC · JPL
39710	1996 TU_{48}	—	October 4, 1996	La Silla	E. W. Elst	NYS	3.2 km	MPC · JPL
39711	1996 TW_{53}	—	October 5, 1996	La Silla	E. W. Elst	PHO	2.9 km	MPC · JPL
39712 Ehimedaigaku	1996 TJ_{54}	Ehimedaigaku	October 14, 1996	Geisei	T. Seki	NYS	2.8 km	MPC · JPL
39713	1996 TE_{57}	—	October 2, 1996	La Silla	E. W. Elst	V	2.2 km	MPC · JPL
39714	1996 UX_{1}	—	October 16, 1996	Kitt Peak	Spacewatch	·	3.0 km	MPC · JPL
39715	1996 VT	—	November 2, 1996	Prescott	P. G. Comba	·	2.0 km	MPC · JPL
39716	1996 VD_{2}	—	November 6, 1996	Oizumi	T. Kobayashi	·	3.1 km	MPC · JPL
39717	1996 VE_{2}	—	November 6, 1996	Oizumi	T. Kobayashi	·	5.4 km	MPC · JPL
39718	1996 VG_{3}	—	November 12, 1996	Sudbury	D. di Cicco	·	3.6 km	MPC · JPL
39719	1996 VF_{4}	—	November 8, 1996	Xinglong	SCAP	NYS	2.9 km	MPC · JPL
39720	1996 VG_{4}	—	November 8, 1996	Xinglong	SCAP	·	3.5 km	MPC · JPL
39721	1996 VU_{7}	—	November 15, 1996	Nachi-Katsuura	Y. Shimizu, T. Urata	NYS	3.2 km	MPC · JPL
39722	1996 VY_{7}	—	November 3, 1996	Kushiro	S. Ueda, H. Kaneda	NYS ·	4.7 km	MPC · JPL
39723 Akazawa	1996 VJ_{8}	Akazawa	November 7, 1996	Kitami	K. Endate, K. Watanabe	·	8.3 km	MPC · JPL
39724	1996 VY_{10}	—	November 4, 1996	Kitt Peak	Spacewatch	V	2.0 km	MPC · JPL
39725	1996 VA_{31}	—	November 2, 1996	Xinglong	SCAP	·	2.5 km	MPC · JPL
39726 Hideyukitezuka	1996 VL_{38}	Hideyukitezuka	November 10, 1996	Nanyo	T. Okuni	·	3.8 km	MPC · JPL
39727	1996 VD_{39}	—	November 7, 1996	Xinglong	SCAP	NYS	2.3 km	MPC · JPL
39728	1996 WG	—	November 17, 1996	Sudbury	D. di Cicco	·	3.5 km	MPC · JPL
39729	1996 XD	—	December 1, 1996	Oohira	T. Urata	NYS	3.6 km	MPC · JPL
39730	1996 XP_{5}	—	December 7, 1996	Oizumi	T. Kobayashi	NYS	3.2 km	MPC · JPL
39731	1996 XL_{14}	—	December 9, 1996	Kitt Peak	Spacewatch	·	2.9 km	MPC · JPL
39732	1996 XK_{18}	—	December 7, 1996	Kitt Peak	Spacewatch	·	7.5 km	MPC · JPL
39733	1996 XJ_{21}	—	December 7, 1996	Kitt Peak	Spacewatch	MAR	3.5 km	MPC · JPL
39734 Marchiori	1996 XG_{26}	Marchiori	December 14, 1996	Sormano	F. Manca, P. Chiavenna	NYS	2.9 km	MPC · JPL
39735	1996 YY_{1}	—	December 20, 1996	Xinglong	SCAP	·	4.9 km	MPC · JPL
39736	1997 AM	—	January 2, 1997	Oizumi	T. Kobayashi	(5)	2.9 km	MPC · JPL
39737	1997 AE_{1}	—	January 2, 1997	Oizumi	T. Kobayashi	EUN	3.6 km	MPC · JPL
39738	1997 AP_{2}	—	January 3, 1997	Oizumi	T. Kobayashi	·	2.5 km	MPC · JPL
39739	1997 AQ_{2}	—	January 3, 1997	Oizumi	T. Kobayashi	·	4.4 km	MPC · JPL
39740	1997 AG_{4}	—	January 6, 1997	Oizumi	T. Kobayashi	·	3.5 km	MPC · JPL
39741 Komm	1997 AT_{6}	Komm	January 9, 1997	Goodricke-Pigott	R. A. Tucker	·	2.0 km	MPC · JPL
39742	1997 AQ_{7}	—	January 5, 1997	Xinglong	SCAP	NYS ·	4.3 km	MPC · JPL
39743	1997 AA_{10}	—	January 3, 1997	Kitt Peak	Spacewatch	·	2.2 km	MPC · JPL
39744	1997 AT_{16}	—	January 14, 1997	Oizumi	T. Kobayashi	NYS	4.1 km	MPC · JPL
39745	1997 AK_{17}	—	January 14, 1997	Haleakala	NEAT	BRG	5.5 km	MPC · JPL
39746	1997 BW	—	January 18, 1997	Xinglong	SCAP	EUN	3.7 km	MPC · JPL
39747	1997 BM_{1}	—	January 29, 1997	Sudbury	D. di Cicco	·	4.7 km	MPC · JPL
39748 Guccini	1997 BJ_{3}	Guccini	January 28, 1997	San Marcello	L. Tesi, G. Cattani	BRG	3.9 km	MPC · JPL
39749	1997 BW_{6}	—	January 28, 1997	Church Stretton	S. P. Laurie	·	2.5 km	MPC · JPL
39750	1997 CQ_{2}	—	February 2, 1997	Kitt Peak	Spacewatch	·	3.3 km	MPC · JPL
39751	1997 CX_{2}	—	February 3, 1997	Oizumi	T. Kobayashi	WIT	4.2 km	MPC · JPL
39752	1997 CB_{5}	—	February 6, 1997	Haleakala	NEAT	MIS	6.0 km	MPC · JPL
39753	1997 CQ_{7}	—	February 1, 1997	Kitt Peak	Spacewatch	EUN	3.3 km	MPC · JPL
39754	1997 CS_{14}	—	February 4, 1997	Kitt Peak	Spacewatch	·	3.5 km	MPC · JPL
39755	1997 CY_{21}	—	February 13, 1997	Oizumi	T. Kobayashi	EUN	2.6 km	MPC · JPL
39756	1997 EH_{10}	—	March 7, 1997	Kitt Peak	Spacewatch	·	4.0 km	MPC · JPL
39757	1997 EL_{28}	—	March 7, 1997	Kitt Peak	Spacewatch	·	2.9 km	MPC · JPL
39758	1997 EA_{31}	—	March 5, 1997	Kitt Peak	Spacewatch	·	4.8 km	MPC · JPL
39759	1997 EX_{42}	—	March 10, 1997	Socorro	LINEAR	EUN	4.9 km	MPC · JPL
39760	1997 EM_{54}	—	March 8, 1997	La Silla	E. W. Elst	·	1.7 km	MPC · JPL
39761	1997 EN_{55}	—	March 2, 1997	Kitt Peak	Spacewatch	·	4.4 km	MPC · JPL
39762	1997 FE_{1}	—	March 29, 1997	Xinglong	SCAP	PAD	6.6 km	MPC · JPL
39763	1997 FD_{3}	—	March 31, 1997	Socorro	LINEAR	·	6.5 km	MPC · JPL
39764	1997 FK_{3}	—	March 31, 1997	Socorro	LINEAR	·	5.0 km	MPC · JPL
39765	1997 GE_{2}	—	April 7, 1997	Kitt Peak	Spacewatch	·	4.1 km	MPC · JPL
39766	1997 GP_{7}	—	April 2, 1997	Socorro	LINEAR	·	4.7 km	MPC · JPL
39767	1997 GD_{12}	—	April 3, 1997	Socorro	LINEAR	·	4.4 km	MPC · JPL
39768	1997 GB_{13}	—	April 3, 1997	Socorro	LINEAR	·	5.1 km	MPC · JPL
39769	1997 GD_{14}	—	April 3, 1997	Socorro	LINEAR	PHO	3.7 km	MPC · JPL
39770	1997 GJ_{16}	—	April 3, 1997	Socorro	LINEAR	KOR	3.2 km	MPC · JPL
39771	1997 GH_{21}	—	April 6, 1997	Socorro	LINEAR	·	6.2 km	MPC · JPL
39772	1997 GL_{22}	—	April 6, 1997	Socorro	LINEAR	·	7.1 km	MPC · JPL
39773	1997 GR_{23}	—	April 6, 1997	Socorro	LINEAR	·	5.3 km	MPC · JPL
39774	1997 GO_{27}	—	April 12, 1997	Kitt Peak	Spacewatch	·	610 m	MPC · JPL
39775	1997 GB_{30}	—	April 13, 1997	Xinglong	SCAP	·	4.5 km	MPC · JPL
39776	1997 GF_{34}	—	April 3, 1997	Socorro	LINEAR	·	4.3 km	MPC · JPL
39777	1997 HE	—	April 27, 1997	Kitt Peak	Spacewatch	·	4.2 km	MPC · JPL
39778	1997 HA_{9}	—	April 30, 1997	Socorro	LINEAR	·	6.9 km	MPC · JPL
39779	1997 HE_{9}	—	April 30, 1997	Socorro	LINEAR	·	4.8 km	MPC · JPL
39780	1997 HR_{10}	—	April 30, 1997	Socorro	LINEAR	KOR	3.1 km	MPC · JPL
39781	1997 HS_{13}	—	April 30, 1997	Socorro	LINEAR	·	5.3 km	MPC · JPL
39782	1997 JR_{15}	—	May 3, 1997	La Silla	E. W. Elst	·	5.2 km	MPC · JPL
39783	1997 LB_{1}	—	June 1, 1997	Kitt Peak	Spacewatch	fast?	6.2 km	MPC · JPL
39784	1997 LB_{2}	—	June 2, 1997	Kitt Peak	Spacewatch	·	6.3 km	MPC · JPL
39785	1997 LV_{10}	—	June 7, 1997	La Silla	E. W. Elst	·	4.4 km	MPC · JPL
39786	1997 LV_{17}	—	June 8, 1997	La Silla	E. W. Elst	HYG	7.1 km	MPC · JPL
39787	1997 MM_{3}	—	June 28, 1997	Socorro	LINEAR	H	1.3 km	MPC · JPL
39788	1997 MQ_{6}	—	June 28, 1997	Kitt Peak	Spacewatch	·	8.6 km	MPC · JPL
39789	1997 OA	—	July 23, 1997	Lake Clear	Williams, K. A.	·	18 km	MPC · JPL
39790	1997 PF	—	August 1, 1997	Haleakala	NEAT	·	10 km	MPC · JPL
39791 Jameshesser	1997 PH_{4}	Jameshesser	August 13, 1997	NRC-DAO	D. D. Balam	H	1.6 km	MPC · JPL
39792 Patrickchevalley	1997 RJ_{4}	Patrickchevalley	September 5, 1997	Caussols	ODAS	·	1.3 km	MPC · JPL
39793	1997 SZ_{23}	—	September 29, 1997	Kitt Peak	Spacewatch	L4	12 km	MPC · JPL
39794	1997 SU_{24}	—	September 30, 1997	Kitt Peak	Spacewatch	L4	20 km	MPC · JPL
39795 Marson	1997 SF_{28}	Marson	September 30, 1997	Kitt Peak	Spacewatch	L4 · ERY	18 km	MPC · JPL
39796	1997 TD	—	October 1, 1997	Haleakala	NEAT	AMO +1km · slow	2.1 km	MPC · JPL
39797	1997 TK_{18}	—	October 3, 1997	Xinglong	SCAP	L4	20 km	MPC · JPL
39798	1997 TW_{28}	—	October 6, 1997	La Silla	Uppsala-DLR Trojan Survey	L4	12 km	MPC · JPL
39799 Hadano	1997 UO_{1}	Hadano	October 23, 1997	Hadano Obs.	A. Asami	·	2.5 km	MPC · JPL
39800	1997 UG_{6}	—	October 23, 1997	Kitt Peak	Spacewatch	NYS	1.7 km	MPC · JPL

== 39801–39900 ==
back to top

Designation			Discovery			Properties		Ref
Permanent	Provisional	Named after	Date	Site	Discoverer(s)	Category	Diam.	Ref
39801	1997 UV_{6}	—	October 23, 1997	Kitt Peak	Spacewatch	·	1.9 km	MPC · JPL
39802 Ivanhlinka	1997 UO_{9}	Ivanhlinka	October 29, 1997	Ondřejov	L. Kotková	·	1.8 km	MPC · JPL
39803	1997 UY_{15}	—	October 23, 1997	Kitt Peak	Spacewatch	L4	14 km	MPC · JPL
39804	1997 VP_{5}	—	November 8, 1997	Oizumi	T. Kobayashi	·	1.7 km	MPC · JPL
39805	1997 WG_{2}	—	November 23, 1997	Oizumi	T. Kobayashi	·	1.8 km	MPC · JPL
39806	1997 WX_{2}	—	November 23, 1997	Oizumi	T. Kobayashi	·	2.0 km	MPC · JPL
39807	1997 WY_{19}	—	November 24, 1997	Kitt Peak	Spacewatch	·	2.4 km	MPC · JPL
39808	1997 WQ_{25}	—	November 25, 1997	Zeno	T. Stafford	·	2.0 km	MPC · JPL
39809 Fukuchan	1997 WB_{30}	Fukuchan	November 30, 1997	Geisei	T. Seki	·	1.5 km	MPC · JPL
39810	1997 WQ_{35}	—	November 29, 1997	Socorro	LINEAR	·	4.7 km	MPC · JPL
39811	1997 WJ_{38}	—	November 29, 1997	Socorro	LINEAR	·	2.3 km	MPC · JPL
39812	1997 WE_{44}	—	November 29, 1997	Socorro	LINEAR	·	2.5 km	MPC · JPL
39813	1997 XV_{4}	—	December 6, 1997	Caussols	ODAS	·	2.8 km	MPC · JPL
39814 Christianlegrand	1997 XF_{8}	Christianlegrand	December 7, 1997	Caussols	ODAS	·	3.3 km	MPC · JPL
39815	1997 XU_{9}	—	December 4, 1997	Xinglong	SCAP	·	1.9 km	MPC · JPL
39816	1997 XE_{11}	—	December 10, 1997	Xinglong	SCAP	·	4.0 km	MPC · JPL
39817	1997 YN	—	December 20, 1997	Oizumi	T. Kobayashi	·	3.3 km	MPC · JPL
39818	1997 YR_{4}	—	December 24, 1997	Chichibu	N. Satō	·	2.0 km	MPC · JPL
39819	1997 YE_{10}	—	December 28, 1997	Oizumi	T. Kobayashi	EUN	3.8 km	MPC · JPL
39820	1997 YV_{17}	—	December 31, 1997	Kitt Peak	Spacewatch	·	1.7 km	MPC · JPL
39821	1998 AH_{7}	—	January 5, 1998	Xinglong	SCAP	·	4.7 km	MPC · JPL
39822	1998 BO	—	January 18, 1998	Oizumi	T. Kobayashi	(883)	3.3 km	MPC · JPL
39823	1998 BV	—	January 19, 1998	Oizumi	T. Kobayashi	·	3.0 km	MPC · JPL
39824	1998 BQ_{1}	—	January 19, 1998	Oizumi	T. Kobayashi	·	3.5 km	MPC · JPL
39825	1998 BP_{2}	—	January 20, 1998	Socorro	LINEAR	·	2.8 km	MPC · JPL
39826	1998 BY_{2}	—	January 19, 1998	Nachi-Katsuura	Y. Shimizu, T. Urata	·	2.6 km	MPC · JPL
39827	1998 BA_{3}	—	January 19, 1998	Prescott	P. G. Comba	·	2.3 km	MPC · JPL
39828	1998 BH_{4}	—	January 21, 1998	Nachi-Katsuura	Y. Shimizu, T. Urata	·	3.2 km	MPC · JPL
39829	1998 BS_{4}	—	January 17, 1998	Caussols	ODAS	V	1.6 km	MPC · JPL
39830	1998 BS_{6}	—	January 24, 1998	Oizumi	T. Kobayashi	·	2.9 km	MPC · JPL
39831	1998 BU_{6}	—	January 24, 1998	Oizumi	T. Kobayashi	·	2.2 km	MPC · JPL
39832	1998 BJ_{9}	—	January 24, 1998	Haleakala	NEAT	V	2.1 km	MPC · JPL
39833	1998 BS_{10}	—	January 25, 1998	Oizumi	T. Kobayashi	·	2.8 km	MPC · JPL
39834	1998 BW_{10}	—	January 23, 1998	Socorro	LINEAR	EOS	7.5 km	MPC · JPL
39835	1998 BQ_{13}	—	January 24, 1998	Socorro	LINEAR	·	2.3 km	MPC · JPL
39836	1998 BJ_{17}	—	January 22, 1998	Kitt Peak	Spacewatch	·	2.1 km	MPC · JPL
39837	1998 BH_{18}	—	January 22, 1998	Kitt Peak	Spacewatch	·	2.0 km	MPC · JPL
39838	1998 BK_{19}	—	January 26, 1998	Farra d'Isonzo	Farra d'Isonzo	V	2.1 km	MPC · JPL
39839	1998 BM_{19}	—	January 18, 1998	Kitt Peak	Spacewatch	·	1.9 km	MPC · JPL
39840	1998 BJ_{24}	—	January 26, 1998	Kitt Peak	Spacewatch	·	3.8 km	MPC · JPL
39841	1998 BU_{24}	—	January 28, 1998	Oizumi	T. Kobayashi	NYS	2.1 km	MPC · JPL
39842	1998 BV_{25}	—	January 29, 1998	Zeno	T. Stafford	·	2.3 km	MPC · JPL
39843	1998 BB_{26}	—	January 29, 1998	Oizumi	T. Kobayashi	·	4.0 km	MPC · JPL
39844	1998 BA_{30}	—	January 29, 1998	Kitt Peak	Spacewatch	·	2.2 km	MPC · JPL
39845	1998 BT_{35}	—	January 28, 1998	Kitt Peak	Spacewatch	(2076)	5.0 km	MPC · JPL
39846	1998 BB_{37}	—	January 26, 1998	Kitt Peak	Spacewatch	·	3.5 km	MPC · JPL
39847	1998 BU_{42}	—	January 20, 1998	Socorro	LINEAR	·	3.1 km	MPC · JPL
39848	1998 BW_{44}	—	January 22, 1998	Kitt Peak	Spacewatch	·	2.2 km	MPC · JPL
39849 Giampieri	1998 CF_{2}	Giampieri	February 13, 1998	San Marcello	L. Tesi, A. Boattini	·	2.1 km	MPC · JPL
39850	1998 CG_{3}	—	February 6, 1998	La Silla	E. W. Elst	·	3.1 km	MPC · JPL
39851	1998 CU_{3}	—	February 6, 1998	La Silla	E. W. Elst	MAS	2.1 km	MPC · JPL
39852	1998 CV_{3}	—	February 6, 1998	La Silla	E. W. Elst	V	1.8 km	MPC · JPL
39853	1998 CA_{4}	—	February 6, 1998	La Silla	E. W. Elst	NYS	3.0 km	MPC · JPL
39854 Gabriopiola	1998 DB_{3}	Gabriopiola	February 20, 1998	Bologna	San Vittore	·	2.6 km	MPC · JPL
39855	1998 DG_{3}	—	February 22, 1998	Haleakala	NEAT	·	5.5 km	MPC · JPL
39856	1998 DV_{4}	—	February 22, 1998	Haleakala	NEAT	·	2.2 km	MPC · JPL
39857	1998 DA_{5}	—	February 22, 1998	Haleakala	NEAT	·	2.8 km	MPC · JPL
39858	1998 DG_{6}	—	February 22, 1998	Haleakala	NEAT	·	3.4 km	MPC · JPL
39859	1998 DC_{7}	—	February 17, 1998	Kitt Peak	Spacewatch	·	2.9 km	MPC · JPL
39860 Aiguoxiang	1998 DY_{7}	Aiguoxiang	February 17, 1998	Xinglong	SCAP	·	1.9 km	MPC · JPL
39861	1998 DO_{8}	—	February 21, 1998	Xinglong	SCAP	·	2.0 km	MPC · JPL
39862	1998 DX_{10}	—	February 17, 1998	Xinglong	SCAP	V	1.5 km	MPC · JPL
39863	1998 DL_{15}	—	February 22, 1998	Haleakala	NEAT	V	3.5 km	MPC · JPL
39864 Poggiali	1998 DH_{20}	Poggiali	February 26, 1998	Campo Catino	F. Mallia, M. Di Sora	EOS	5.7 km	MPC · JPL
39865	1998 DB_{22}	—	February 22, 1998	Kitt Peak	Spacewatch	KOR	2.7 km	MPC · JPL
39866	1998 DB_{24}	—	February 17, 1998	Nachi-Katsuura	Y. Shimizu, T. Urata	H	1.9 km	MPC · JPL
39867	1998 DG_{24}	—	February 22, 1998	Kitt Peak	Spacewatch	·	2.5 km	MPC · JPL
39868	1998 DM_{27}	—	February 27, 1998	Bédoin	P. Antonini	·	2.7 km	MPC · JPL
39869	1998 DV_{27}	—	February 21, 1998	Kitt Peak	Spacewatch	MAS	2.8 km	MPC · JPL
39870	1998 DX_{27}	—	February 23, 1998	Kitt Peak	Spacewatch	·	2.3 km	MPC · JPL
39871 Lucagrazzini	1998 DB_{33}	Lucagrazzini	February 27, 1998	Cima Ekar	G. Forti, M. Tombelli	RAF	3.6 km	MPC · JPL
39872	1998 DW_{33}	—	February 27, 1998	La Silla	E. W. Elst	MAS	2.3 km	MPC · JPL
39873	1998 DC_{34}	—	February 27, 1998	La Silla	E. W. Elst	·	4.4 km	MPC · JPL
39874	1998 DC_{35}	—	February 27, 1998	La Silla	E. W. Elst	·	4.0 km	MPC · JPL
39875 Matteolombardo	1998 DS_{35}	Matteolombardo	February 27, 1998	Cima Ekar	G. Forti, M. Tombelli	·	2.8 km	MPC · JPL
39876	1998 DB_{38}	—	February 27, 1998	Haleakala	NEAT	NYS ·	5.0 km	MPC · JPL
39877 Deverchére	1998 EQ_{6}	Deverchére	March 1, 1998	Caussols	ODAS	NYS	1.7 km	MPC · JPL
39878	1998 EH_{8}	—	March 2, 1998	Xinglong	SCAP	·	2.6 km	MPC · JPL
39879	1998 EK_{8}	—	March 3, 1998	Nachi-Katsuura	Y. Shimizu, T. Urata	V	3.7 km	MPC · JPL
39880 Dobšinský	1998 ER_{9}	Dobšinský	March 15, 1998	Modra	L. Kornoš, P. Kolény	·	2.4 km	MPC · JPL
39881	1998 EK_{11}	—	March 1, 1998	La Silla	E. W. Elst	·	2.7 km	MPC · JPL
39882 Edgarmitchell	1998 EM_{11}	Edgarmitchell	March 1, 1998	La Silla	E. W. Elst	·	2.5 km	MPC · JPL
39883	1998 ER_{11}	—	March 1, 1998	La Silla	E. W. Elst	·	1.8 km	MPC · JPL
39884	1998 ET_{11}	—	March 1, 1998	La Silla	E. W. Elst	·	3.8 km	MPC · JPL
39885	1998 EG_{12}	—	March 1, 1998	La Silla	E. W. Elst	·	3.1 km	MPC · JPL
39886	1998 EL_{12}	—	March 1, 1998	La Silla	E. W. Elst	EOS	8.2 km	MPC · JPL
39887	1998 ED_{13}	—	March 1, 1998	La Silla	E. W. Elst	·	3.4 km	MPC · JPL
39888	1998 ES_{20}	—	March 3, 1998	La Silla	E. W. Elst	NYS ·	3.4 km	MPC · JPL
39889	1998 FG	—	March 17, 1998	Woomera	F. B. Zoltowski	·	3.9 km	MPC · JPL
39890 Bobstephens	1998 FA_{3}	Bobstephens	March 23, 1998	Ondřejov	P. Pravec	·	2.1 km	MPC · JPL
39891	1998 FB_{5}	—	March 20, 1998	Socorro	LINEAR	H	1.7 km	MPC · JPL
39892 Evaseidlová	1998 FQ_{5}	Evaseidlová	March 23, 1998	Modra	A. Galád, Pravda, A.	·	3.4 km	MPC · JPL
39893	1998 FS_{5}	—	March 24, 1998	Kleť	Kleť	·	4.8 km	MPC · JPL
39894	1998 FO_{13}	—	March 26, 1998	Haleakala	NEAT	·	2.8 km	MPC · JPL
39895	1998 FK_{15}	—	March 28, 1998	Farra d'Isonzo	Farra d'Isonzo	·	3.4 km	MPC · JPL
39896	1998 FB_{16}	—	March 29, 1998	Caussols	ODAS	·	5.3 km	MPC · JPL
39897	1998 FL_{23}	—	March 20, 1998	Socorro	LINEAR	·	2.7 km	MPC · JPL
39898	1998 FQ_{23}	—	March 20, 1998	Socorro	LINEAR	MAS	1.7 km	MPC · JPL
39899	1998 FP_{26}	—	March 20, 1998	Socorro	LINEAR	·	3.3 km	MPC · JPL
39900	1998 FW_{26}	—	March 20, 1998	Socorro	LINEAR	NYS ·	4.2 km	MPC · JPL

== 39901–40000 ==
back to top

Designation			Discovery			Properties		Ref
Permanent	Provisional	Named after	Date	Site	Discoverer(s)	Category	Diam.	Ref
39901	1998 FW_{27}	—	March 20, 1998	Socorro	LINEAR	NYS	2.4 km	MPC · JPL
39902	1998 FG_{30}	—	March 20, 1998	Socorro	LINEAR	ERI	6.1 km	MPC · JPL
39903	1998 FL_{30}	—	March 20, 1998	Socorro	LINEAR	NYS ·	6.2 km	MPC · JPL
39904	1998 FX_{30}	—	March 20, 1998	Socorro	LINEAR	·	2.8 km	MPC · JPL
39905	1998 FZ_{30}	—	March 20, 1998	Socorro	LINEAR	·	3.8 km	MPC · JPL
39906	1998 FE_{32}	—	March 20, 1998	Socorro	LINEAR	·	2.6 km	MPC · JPL
39907	1998 FO_{33}	—	March 20, 1998	Socorro	LINEAR	V	1.6 km	MPC · JPL
39908	1998 FW_{34}	—	March 20, 1998	Socorro	LINEAR	·	3.3 km	MPC · JPL
39909	1998 FM_{36}	—	March 20, 1998	Socorro	LINEAR	·	3.0 km	MPC · JPL
39910	1998 FJ_{37}	—	March 20, 1998	Socorro	LINEAR	MAR	5.7 km	MPC · JPL
39911	1998 FD_{38}	—	March 20, 1998	Socorro	LINEAR	·	2.2 km	MPC · JPL
39912	1998 FN_{40}	—	March 20, 1998	Socorro	LINEAR	·	3.0 km	MPC · JPL
39913	1998 FV_{40}	—	March 20, 1998	Socorro	LINEAR	MAS	2.1 km	MPC · JPL
39914	1998 FN_{41}	—	March 20, 1998	Socorro	LINEAR	·	2.0 km	MPC · JPL
39915	1998 FY_{42}	—	March 20, 1998	Socorro	LINEAR	MAS	2.5 km	MPC · JPL
39916	1998 FH_{47}	—	March 20, 1998	Socorro	LINEAR	·	3.1 km	MPC · JPL
39917	1998 FV_{48}	—	March 20, 1998	Socorro	LINEAR	·	3.4 km	MPC · JPL
39918	1998 FS_{49}	—	March 20, 1998	Socorro	LINEAR	NYS ·	6.0 km	MPC · JPL
39919	1998 FP_{51}	—	March 20, 1998	Socorro	LINEAR	NYS ·	4.1 km	MPC · JPL
39920	1998 FW_{53}	—	March 20, 1998	Socorro	LINEAR	·	4.5 km	MPC · JPL
39921	1998 FO_{54}	—	March 20, 1998	Socorro	LINEAR	·	3.4 km	MPC · JPL
39922	1998 FJ_{57}	—	March 20, 1998	Socorro	LINEAR	·	5.1 km	MPC · JPL
39923	1998 FT_{57}	—	March 20, 1998	Socorro	LINEAR	·	1.8 km	MPC · JPL
39924	1998 FL_{60}	—	March 20, 1998	Socorro	LINEAR	·	1.8 km	MPC · JPL
39925	1998 FP_{60}	—	March 20, 1998	Socorro	LINEAR	·	3.3 km	MPC · JPL
39926	1998 FF_{64}	—	March 20, 1998	Socorro	LINEAR	·	3.8 km	MPC · JPL
39927	1998 FM_{68}	—	March 20, 1998	Socorro	LINEAR	V	1.9 km	MPC · JPL
39928	1998 FR_{70}	—	March 20, 1998	Socorro	LINEAR	·	3.6 km	MPC · JPL
39929	1998 FZ_{71}	—	March 20, 1998	Socorro	LINEAR	NYS	2.1 km	MPC · JPL
39930 Kalauch	1998 FR_{74}	Kalauch	March 24, 1998	Drebach	G. Lehmann	·	2.2 km	MPC · JPL
39931	1998 FP_{75}	—	March 24, 1998	Socorro	LINEAR	·	3.3 km	MPC · JPL
39932	1998 FQ_{75}	—	March 24, 1998	Socorro	LINEAR	·	2.1 km	MPC · JPL
39933	1998 FN_{76}	—	March 24, 1998	Socorro	LINEAR	·	3.6 km	MPC · JPL
39934	1998 FP_{79}	—	March 24, 1998	Socorro	LINEAR	·	6.1 km	MPC · JPL
39935	1998 FR_{85}	—	March 24, 1998	Socorro	LINEAR	EUN	3.7 km	MPC · JPL
39936	1998 FZ_{85}	—	March 24, 1998	Socorro	LINEAR	·	2.7 km	MPC · JPL
39937	1998 FW_{98}	—	March 31, 1998	Socorro	LINEAR	V	2.4 km	MPC · JPL
39938	1998 FF_{99}	—	March 31, 1998	Socorro	LINEAR	·	3.0 km	MPC · JPL
39939	1998 FQ_{99}	—	March 31, 1998	Socorro	LINEAR	·	2.4 km	MPC · JPL
39940	1998 FR_{99}	—	March 31, 1998	Socorro	LINEAR	·	3.9 km	MPC · JPL
39941	1998 FX_{101}	—	March 31, 1998	Socorro	LINEAR	·	9.5 km	MPC · JPL
39942	1998 FH_{104}	—	March 31, 1998	Socorro	LINEAR	·	2.5 km	MPC · JPL
39943	1998 FO_{109}	—	March 31, 1998	Socorro	LINEAR	V	2.5 km	MPC · JPL
39944	1998 FO_{110}	—	March 31, 1998	Socorro	LINEAR	·	3.6 km	MPC · JPL
39945	1998 FT_{110}	—	March 31, 1998	Socorro	LINEAR	ADE	6.4 km	MPC · JPL
39946	1998 FP_{111}	—	March 31, 1998	Socorro	LINEAR	PHO	2.8 km	MPC · JPL
39947	1998 FZ_{112}	—	March 31, 1998	Socorro	LINEAR	·	2.6 km	MPC · JPL
39948	1998 FP_{113}	—	March 31, 1998	Socorro	LINEAR	·	3.6 km	MPC · JPL
39949	1998 FG_{115}	—	March 31, 1998	Socorro	LINEAR	·	3.7 km	MPC · JPL
39950	1998 FB_{116}	—	March 31, 1998	Socorro	LINEAR	EUN	5.4 km	MPC · JPL
39951	1998 FN_{116}	—	March 31, 1998	Socorro	LINEAR	V	2.5 km	MPC · JPL
39952	1998 FM_{117}	—	March 31, 1998	Socorro	LINEAR	·	5.1 km	MPC · JPL
39953	1998 FJ_{118}	—	March 31, 1998	Socorro	LINEAR	·	3.3 km	MPC · JPL
39954	1998 FN_{118}	—	March 31, 1998	Socorro	LINEAR	PHO	4.0 km	MPC · JPL
39955	1998 FV_{118}	—	March 31, 1998	Socorro	LINEAR	SUL	6.1 km	MPC · JPL
39956	1998 FK_{120}	—	March 20, 1998	Socorro	LINEAR	·	2.9 km	MPC · JPL
39957	1998 FG_{121}	—	March 20, 1998	Socorro	LINEAR	·	2.4 km	MPC · JPL
39958	1998 FB_{122}	—	March 20, 1998	Socorro	LINEAR	NYS	2.1 km	MPC · JPL
39959	1998 FH_{122}	—	March 20, 1998	Socorro	LINEAR	·	4.0 km	MPC · JPL
39960	1998 FU_{122}	—	March 20, 1998	Socorro	LINEAR	·	1.5 km	MPC · JPL
39961	1998 FH_{123}	—	March 20, 1998	Socorro	LINEAR	·	2.4 km	MPC · JPL
39962	1998 FX_{123}	—	March 24, 1998	Socorro	LINEAR	·	3.8 km	MPC · JPL
39963	1998 FQ_{132}	—	March 20, 1998	Socorro	LINEAR	·	3.4 km	MPC · JPL
39964	1998 FP_{136}	—	March 28, 1998	Socorro	LINEAR	V	1.5 km	MPC · JPL
39965	1998 FK_{137}	—	March 28, 1998	Socorro	LINEAR	·	1.9 km	MPC · JPL
39966	1998 FB_{141}	—	March 29, 1998	Socorro	LINEAR	·	2.1 km	MPC · JPL
39967	1998 GE	—	April 2, 1998	Socorro	LINEAR	BAR	3.3 km	MPC · JPL
39968	1998 GG_{3}	—	April 2, 1998	Socorro	LINEAR	·	4.9 km	MPC · JPL
39969	1998 GT_{8}	—	April 2, 1998	Socorro	LINEAR	PHO	6.4 km	MPC · JPL
39970	1998 GM_{9}	—	April 2, 1998	Socorro	LINEAR	PHO	4.2 km	MPC · JPL
39971 József	1998 GN_{10}	József	April 2, 1998	Piszkéstető	L. Kiss, K. Sárneczky	·	2.1 km	MPC · JPL
39972	1998 HT	—	April 17, 1998	Kitt Peak	Spacewatch	·	5.1 km	MPC · JPL
39973	1998 HX	—	April 17, 1998	Kitt Peak	Spacewatch	·	4.5 km	MPC · JPL
39974	1998 HO_{3}	—	April 17, 1998	Kitt Peak	Spacewatch	MAR	3.2 km	MPC · JPL
39975	1998 HY_{6}	—	April 20, 1998	Gekko	T. Kagawa	·	2.9 km	MPC · JPL
39976	1998 HV_{8}	—	April 17, 1998	Kitt Peak	Spacewatch	·	3.6 km	MPC · JPL
39977	1998 HR_{9}	—	April 18, 1998	Kitt Peak	Spacewatch	·	4.0 km	MPC · JPL
39978	1998 HB_{11}	—	April 17, 1998	Kitt Peak	Spacewatch	·	3.3 km	MPC · JPL
39979	1998 HT_{12}	—	April 22, 1998	Haleakala	NEAT	PHO	5.4 km	MPC · JPL
39980	1998 HT_{13}	—	April 18, 1998	Socorro	LINEAR	·	2.5 km	MPC · JPL
39981	1998 HT_{14}	—	April 17, 1998	Kitt Peak	Spacewatch	·	4.0 km	MPC · JPL
39982	1998 HD_{16}	—	April 22, 1998	Kitt Peak	Spacewatch	·	2.7 km	MPC · JPL
39983	1998 HX_{16}	—	April 18, 1998	Socorro	LINEAR	V	1.8 km	MPC · JPL
39984	1998 HQ_{18}	—	April 18, 1998	Socorro	LINEAR	·	3.4 km	MPC · JPL
39985	1998 HT_{23}	—	April 28, 1998	Kitt Peak	Spacewatch	·	2.7 km	MPC · JPL
39986	1998 HJ_{32}	—	April 20, 1998	Socorro	LINEAR	·	3.6 km	MPC · JPL
39987	1998 HJ_{33}	—	April 20, 1998	Socorro	LINEAR	NYS	2.9 km	MPC · JPL
39988	1998 HO_{33}	—	April 20, 1998	Socorro	LINEAR	PHO	4.2 km	MPC · JPL
39989	1998 HP_{35}	—	April 20, 1998	Socorro	LINEAR	·	3.1 km	MPC · JPL
39990	1998 HT_{36}	—	April 20, 1998	Socorro	LINEAR	·	3.5 km	MPC · JPL
39991 Iochroma	1998 HR_{37}	Iochroma	April 20, 1998	Socorro	LINEAR	·	5.0 km	MPC · JPL
39992	1998 HB_{38}	—	April 20, 1998	Socorro	LINEAR	·	3.3 km	MPC · JPL
39993	1998 HQ_{41}	—	April 24, 1998	Kitt Peak	Spacewatch	·	2.6 km	MPC · JPL
39994	1998 HA_{48}	—	April 20, 1998	Socorro	LINEAR	·	2.6 km	MPC · JPL
39995	1998 HC_{51}	—	April 25, 1998	Anderson Mesa	LONEOS	·	8.3 km	MPC · JPL
39996	1998 HB_{53}	—	April 21, 1998	Socorro	LINEAR	·	2.2 km	MPC · JPL
39997	1998 HE_{76}	—	April 21, 1998	Socorro	LINEAR	·	4.1 km	MPC · JPL
39998	1998 HS_{78}	—	April 21, 1998	Socorro	LINEAR	·	3.3 km	MPC · JPL
39999	1998 HL_{84}	—	April 21, 1998	Socorro	LINEAR	V	1.7 km	MPC · JPL
40000	1998 HZ_{87}	—	April 21, 1998	Socorro	LINEAR	MAR	2.6 km	MPC · JPL

back to top

== See also ==
- Meanings of minor-planet names: 39001–40000
