= Meanings of minor-planet names: 39001–40000 =

As minor planet discoveries are confirmed, they are given a permanent number by the IAU's Minor Planet Center (MPC), and the discoverers can then submit names for them, following the IAU's naming conventions. The list below concerns those minor planets in the specified number-range that have received names, and explains the meanings of those names.

Official naming citations of newly named small Solar System bodies are approved and published in a bulletin by IAU's Working Group for Small Bodies Nomenclature (WGSBN). Before May 2021, citations were published in MPC's Minor Planet Circulars for many decades. Recent citations can also be found on the JPL Small-Body Database (SBDB). Until his death in 2016, German astronomer Lutz D. Schmadel compiled these citations into the Dictionary of Minor Planet Names (DMP) and regularly updated the collection.

Based on Paul Herget's The Names of the Minor Planets, Schmadel also researched the unclear origin of numerous asteroids, most of which had been named prior to World War II. This article incorporates text from this source, which is in the public domain: SBDB New namings may only be added to this list below after official publication as the preannouncement of names is condemned. The WGSBN publishes a comprehensive guideline for the naming rules of non-cometary small Solar System bodies.

== 39001–39100 ==
Named minor planet	Provisional	This minor planet was named for...	Ref · Catalog
There are no named minor planets in this number range

== 39101–39200 ==
back to top

Named minor planet	Provisional	This minor planet was named for...	Ref · Catalog
39137 Wymanwong	2000 WX_{62}	Wyman Wong, Hong Kong lyricist whose creative use of the Cantonese language has shaped modern Cantopop. His celebrated lyrics include Tourbillon, a meditation on the value of time, and many enduring classics cherished by Chinese-speaking audiences.	IAU · 39137
39167 Opitom	2000 WT_{130}	Cyrielle Opitom (born 1989) is a postdoctoral fellow at the University of Edinburgh who is an expert in comet observations, including measuring the isotopic ratios in cometary comae.	IAU · 39167
39184 Willgrundy	2000 WG_{166}	William ("Will") M. Grundy, astronomer at Lowell Observatory	JPL · 39184

== 39201–39300 ==
back to top

Named minor planet	Provisional	This minor planet was named for...	Ref · Catalog
39256 Zacny	2000 YE_{120}	Kris Zacny (born 1973) is a leader in the development of robotic drilling and sample handling hardware for a variety of planetary missions and in-situ resource utilization applications.	IAU · 39256
39285 Kipkeino	2001 BP_{75}	Kipchoge Keino (born 1940) won the 1500-m event at the 1968 Olympics by a record-setting margin of 20 meters. His running career spanned 1962 to 1973. After retiring, he and his wife, Phyllis, worked to educate and care for orphans in Kenya. In 2016 he was awarded the first Olympic Laurel for education, culture, development and peace through sport.	IAU · 39285
39290 Landsman	2001 CC_{29}	Zoe Landsman (born 1987) is a lecturer at the University of Central Florida, specializing in observations and modeling of asteroids and other airless bodies, particularly M-types and low albedo asteroid families. She is also a committed educator and actively engages in public outreach.	IAU · 39290
39300 Auyeungsungfan	2001 HM_{38}	Auyeungsungfan (born 1959) spent 20 years as a school principal.	JPL · 39300

== 39301–39400 ==
back to top

Named minor planet	Provisional	This minor planet was named for...	Ref · Catalog
39314 Moritakumi	2001 UH_{5}	Takumi Mori (1936–2015) worked in the Japan Coast Guard for many years, undertaking research in positional astronomy and geodetic observations. He also made efforts towards the establishment of the Kansai Branch of the Japan Spaceguard Association.	JPL · 39314
39332 Lauwaiming	2002 AH_{10}	Lau Wai Ming (born 1960), a School principal as well as a committed and passionate educator who firmly believes in the value of knowledge. He has served in the education field for 38 years and has inspired and touch the hearts of many teachers and students.	JPL · 39332
39335 Caccin	2002 AR_{12}	Bruno Caccin (born 1944), an Italian astronomer who worked at Capodimonte Observatory in Naples for 15 years. In 1986 he became professor in astronomy at the University of Rome, Tor Vergata.	JPL · 39335
39336 Mariacapria	2002 AA_{13}	Maria Teresa Capria, an Italian astronomer and researcher at IASF-CNR in Rome.	JPL · 39336
39372 Wongtzewah	2002 CS_{51}	Dayo Wong Tze Wah, Hong Kong performer.	IAU · 39372
39382 Opportunity	2696 P-L	The Opportunity rover is one of NASA's successful 2004 Mars Exploration Rovers. It explored rock layers in the walls of craters at Meridiani Planum.	JPL · 39382

== 39401–39500 ==
back to top

Named minor planet	Provisional	This minor planet was named for...	Ref · Catalog
39405 Mosigkau	1063 T-1	Mosigkau castle, near Dessau, Germany, a relic of the Rococo period, built between 1752 and 1757 as a summer residence for Princess Anna Wilhelmine von Anhalt-Dessau	JPL · 39405
39415 Janeausten	4231 T-1	Jane Austen, English novelist	JPL · 39415
39420 Elizabethgaskell	2084 T-2	Elizabeth Gaskell (1810–1865) was a 19th-century English novelist, best known for her 1853 novel Cranford.	JPL · 39420
39427 Charlottebrontë	3360 T-2	Charlotte Brontë, English novelist and poet, best known for Jane Eyre	JPL · 39427
39428 Emilybrontë	4169 T-2	Emily Brontë, English novelist and poet, who wrote only one novel, Wuthering Heights	JPL · 39428
39429 Annebrontë	4223 T-2	Anne Brontë, English novelist and poet, best known for The Tenant of Wildfell Hall	JPL · 39429
39463 Phyleus	1973 SZ	Phyleus, son of King Augeas of Elis, and father of Meges, who led the contingent from Dulichium to the Trojan War	JPL · 39463
39464 Pöppelmann	1973 UO_{5}	Matthäus Daniel Pöppelmann (1662–1736), a German architect	JPL · 39464

== 39501–39600 ==
back to top

Named minor planet	Provisional	This minor planet was named for...	Ref · Catalog
39509 Kardashev	1981 US_{11}	Nikolai Kardashev (1932–2019), director of the Astrospace Center of the Lebedev Physical Institute.	JPL · 39509
39516 Lusigny	1987 OO	Lusigny (sur Barse) is a small French village near the Lac d'Orient in Aube.	JPL · 39516
39529 Vatnajökull	1989 VJ_{1}	Vatnajökull (Glacier of Lakes), the largest glacier in Iceland.	MPC · 39529
39536 Lenhof	1990 TA_{11}	Helmut Lenhof (1924–), a retired professor of physics. He was one of the founders of the Carinthian Astronomical Association in Klagenfurt, Austria.	JPL · 39536
39539 Emmadesmet	1991 GU_{4}	Emma de Smet (born 2005), a granddaughter of Belgian astronomer Eric Walter Elst who discovered this minor planet.	JPL · 39539
39540 Borchert	1991 GF_{11}	Wolfgang Borchert (1921–1947), German poet and writer	JPL · 39540
39543 Aubriet	1991 PX_{7}	Claude Aubriet (c. 1651–1742), French painter	JPL · 39543
39549 Casals	1992 DP_{13}	Pablo Casals (1876–1973), Spanish (Catalan)-American cellist, composer and conductor	JPL · 39549
39557 Gielgud	1992 JG	John Gielgud (1904–2000), British actor	JPL · 39557
39558 Kishine	1992 KC	Junichiro Kishine (born 1967), Japanese theoretical physicist and amateur astronomer. He is an expert in condensed matter physics.	JPL · 39558
39564 Tarsia	1992 RT_{5}	Rodrigo Dias Tarsia (born 1946), a Brazilian astrophysicist and retired professor at the Federal University in Belo Horizonte	JPL · 39564
39566 Carllewis	1992 SQ_{1}	Carl Lewis (born 1961), an American track and field athlete who won nine Olympic gold medals	JPL · 39566
39571 Pückler	1992 SN_{24}	Hermann, Fürst von Pückler-Muskau (1785–1871), German landscaper and writer	JPL · 39571

== 39601–39700 ==
back to top

Named minor planet	Provisional	This minor planet was named for...	Ref · Catalog
39635 Kusatao	1994 YL	Kusatao Nakamura, Chinese-born Japanese Haiku poet	JPL · 39635
39641 Pézy	1995 KM_{1}	Pézy, a former French commune located in Beauce in the department of Eure-et-Loir.	JPL · 39641
39645 Davelharris	1995 QC_{10}	David Lowell Harris, 20th-century American astronomer, member of the "pre-LINEAR" observing team at Socorro during 1995–1996	JPL · 39645
39653 Carnera	1995 UC	Luigi Carnera (1875–1962) began his career as Max Wolf's assistant at the Heidelberg Observatory, Germany, where he discovered sixteen new asteroids in 1901/02. Later, he taught astronomy in Genoa and was director of Trieste and Naples Observatories.	JPL · 39653
39655 Muneharuasada	1995 UM_{3}	Muneharu Asada (born 1961), a member of the Yamagata Astronomical Society.	JPL · 39655
39677 Anagaribaldi	1996 EG	Ana Maria de Jesus Ribeiro da Silva di Garibaldi (Anita Garibaldi), Brazilian-born heroine of the Italian resurgence and wife of Giuseppe Garibaldi	JPL · 39677
39678 Ammannito	1996 LQ_{1}	Eleonora Ammannito, Italian astronomer and space scientist	JPL · 39678
39679 Nukuhiyama	1996 OD_{3}	Nukuhiyama, a mountain which is located in the west of the discoverer's home town, Shirataka, Yamagata prefecture.	JPL · 39679
39686 Takeshihara	1996 PT_{9}	Takeshi Hara, a member of the Yamagata Astronomical Society in 2009 and actively popularizes astronomy.	JPL · 39686
39699 Ernestocorte	1996 TF_{8}	Ernesto Corte, American entrepreneur, founder of Gamma-Metrics, pioneer in the application of radiation physics to elemental analysis of materials	JPL · 39699

== 39701–39800 ==
back to top

Named minor planet	Provisional	This minor planet was named for...	Ref · Catalog
39703 Reina	1996 TD_{13}	Reina Taguchi, registered dietitian and amateur astronomer in Japan.	IAU · 39703
39712 Ehimedaigaku	1996 TJ_{54}	Ehime University (Ehime Daigaku) is a Japanese national university. Its Research Center for Space and Cosmic Evolution has conducted various deep surveys of the universe and has discovered very high-redshift galaxies	JPL · 39712
39723 Akazawa	1996 VJ_{8}	Hidehiko Akazawa, Japanese amateur astronomer	IAU · 39723
39726 Hideyukitezuka	1996 VL_{38}	Hideyuki Tezuka (born 1955) a Japanese amateur astronomer who became a member of the Nanyo Astronomical Lovers Club in 1986 and actively popularizes astronomy.	JPL · 39726
39734 Marchiori	1996 XG_{26}	Gianpietro Marchiori (born 1953) is the founder of EIE Group, an Italian company that has been involved in the construction of optical and radio telescopes around the world.	JPL · 39734
39741 Komm	1997 AT_{6}	Rudolf Walter Komm (born 1957) is an American helioseismologist who has contributed substantially to the study of solar activity. His studies include tracing the movements of active regions, measuring fluctuations in solar oscillations and determining flows in granulation. Komm has also developed several innovative methods of time-series analysis.	JPL · 39741
39748 Guccini	1997 BJ_{3}	Francesco Guccini (born 1940) is an Italian folk composer and singer, very famous for his popular songs.	JPL · 39748
39791 Jameshesser	1997 PH_{4}	James E. Hesser is a Canadian astronomer, acting director of the Herzberg Institute of Astrophysics and 1997 recipient of the Michael Smith Award for Science Promotion. He has contributed to the study of atomic and molecular spectroscopy, rapidly varying degenerate stars, stellar populations and chemical evolution in the Milky Way and nearby galaxies (Src).	JPL · 39791
39792 Patrickchevalley	1997 RJ_{4}	Patrick Chevalley (born 1958), a Swiss amateur astronomer and computer engineer, who is the author of the "Cartes du Ciel" planetarium and "CCDciel" image acquisition freeware, and co-author of the "Virtual Moon Atlas" freeware.	IAU · 39792
39795 Marson	1997 SF_{28}	Roberto Marson (1944–2011) was a multi-sport athlete who competed in four Paralympics from 1964 to 1976 winning a total of 26 medals. He was named Outstanding Athlete at the 1968 games after winning ten gold medals. He was added to the International Paralympian Hall of Fame in 2012.	IAU · 39795
39799 Hadano	1997 UO_{1}	The Japanese city of Hadano in Kanagawa Prefecture is where the Hadano Observatory (355) is located. The city was famous for its tobacco production, and is now noted for its fresh springs. Hadano is situated at the foot of the Tanzawa mountains in an area of great natural beauty.	JPL · 39799

== 39801–39900 ==
back to top

Named minor planet	Provisional	This minor planet was named for...	Ref · Catalog
39802 Ivanhlinka	1997 UO_{9}	Ivan Hlinka (1950–2004) was one of the biggest legends in the history of Czech ice hockey. He won gold medals at the World Championships in 1972, 1976 and 1977. As a coach, he won gold medals at the Olympic Games in 1998 and at the World Championship in 1999. He was a member of the IIHF Hall of Fame from 2002.	JPL · 39802
39809 Fukuchan	1997 WB_{30}	Fukuchan, cartoon character created by Ryuichi Yokoyama	JPL · 39809
39814 Christianlegrand	1997 XF_{8}	Christian Legrand (born 1953), a French amateur astronomer and public service engineer, who is a co-author of the "Virtual Moon Atlas" freeware and the author of books and articles about the Moon.	IAU · 39814
39849 Giampieri	1998 CF_{2}	Giuliano Giampieri, friend of the first discoverer	JPL · 39849
39854 Gabriopiola	1998 DB_{3}	Gabrio Piola (1794–1850), an Italian mathematician and physicist, known for his treatises on mechanics. The Piola–Kirchhoff stress tensor and Piola transformation are named after him.	JPL · 39854
39860 Aiguoxiang	1998 DY_{7}	Ai Guoxiang (born 1938) is a solar astrophysicist, an Academician of the Chinese Academy of Sciences (CAS), and an Academician of TWAS. He was the first Director General of the National Astronomical Observatories, CAS, and served as vice-president and president of IAU Commission 10 from 1994 to 2000.	JPL · 39860
39864 Poggiali	1998 DH_{20}	Maurizio Poggiali, poet, aircraft navigator and aerospace engineer	JPL · 39864
39871 Lucagrazzini	1998 DB_{33}	Luca Grazzini (born 1974), an Italian amateur astronomer and member of the astrometry team at Beppe Forti Astronomical Observatory (K83) in Montelupo Fiorentino, Tuscany.	IAU · 39871
39875 Matteolombardo	1998 DS_{35}	Matteo Lombardo (born 1964), an Italian amateur astronomer and member of the astrometry team at Beppe Forti Astronomical Observatory (K83) in Montelupo Fiorentino, Tuscany.	IAU · 39875
39877 Deverchére	1998 EQ_{6}	Philippe Deverchére (born 1959), a French amateur astronomer and engineer, who has developed the "C2A" and light-pollution analysis freeware and instrumentation.	IAU · 39877
39880 Dobšinský	1998 ER_{9}	Pavol Emanuel Dobšinský (1828–1885), a Lutheran pastor, folklorist, literary historian, editor and translator	JPL · 39880
39882 Edgarmitchell	1998 EM_{11}	Edgar Mitchell (1930–2016), an American naval officer, aviator and NASA astronaut, who was the sixth man to walk on the Moon.	JPL · 39882
39890 Bobstephens	1998 FA_{3}	Robert Stephens (born 1955) is an American amateur astronomer from California who has determined some 30 sets of minor-planet lightcurve parameters since becoming active in the field in 1999. His high-quality work and generosity in sharing his time and knowledge within the amateur community have set a standard for others to follow.	JPL · 39890
39892 Evaseidlová	1998 FQ_{5}	Eva Seidlová (b. 1948), a Slovak marathon runner.	IAU · 39892

== 39901–40000 ==
back to top

Named minor planet	Provisional	This minor planet was named for...	Ref · Catalog
39930 Kalauch	1998 FR_{74}	Klaus-Dieter Kalauch (born 1958), a German amateur astronomer and teacher of astronomy, understood how to inspire his friends with the beauty of the sky. Without his influence, Gerhard Lehmann, who discovered this object, would never have become interested in observing minor planets.	JPL · 39930
39971 József	1998 GN_{10}	Attila József (1905–1937), one of the greatest Hungarian poets of the 20th century, spent his entire life in extreme poverty and suffered from depression. He was a prodigy, making his debut at the age of 17 with his first collection of poems. During his short and rhapsodic career, an amazing oeuvre emerged.	JPL · 39971
39991 Iochroma	1998 HR_{37}	Iochroma, a genus of shrubs and small trees found in the forests of South America. Their hummingbird-pollinated flowers are tubular or trumpet-shaped. Iochromas are often cultivated as flowering ornamentals.	JPL · 39991

back to top

Preceded by 38,001–39,000	Meanings of minor-planet names List of minor planets: 39,001–40,000	Succeeded by 40,001–41,000
