= List of comets with no meaningful orbit =

This is a list of comets designated with X/ prefix. The majority of these comets were discovered before the invention of the telescope in 1610, and as such there was nobody to plot the positions of the comets to a high enough precision to generate any meaningful orbit. Later comets, observed in the 17th century or later, either did not have enough observations, sometimes as few as one or two, or the comet disintegrated or moved out of a favorable location in the sky before it was possible to make more observations of it.

== List ==
Comet	Discoverer(s) / Namesake(s)	Comment
X/-2287		Described by Ancient Egyptians as a "hairy star accompanying Pepi I Meryre to the heavens." Possible apparition of C/1995 O1 (Hale–Bopp)
X/-371	Aristotle	Progenitor of all the Kreutz sungrazers. Also known as the Great Comet of 371 BC
X/-325	Aristotle	Possible apparition of 1P/Halley
X/-233 B1		
X/-156 U1		
X/-137 K1		
X/-134 N1		
X/-119 K1		
X/54 L1		
X/60 P1		
X/79 F1		
X/193 V1		Possible apparition of C/1917 F1 (Mellish)
X/245		Possible apparition of 12P/Pons–Brooks
X/363 P1		Possible apparition of C/1969 Y1 (Bennett)
X/363		Bright Kreutz sungrazer/s seen by Ammianus Marcellinus
X/422 F1		
X/423 C1		Either a Kreutz sungrazer or an earlier apparition of C/1931 P1 (Ryves)
X/595 A1		
X/607 U1		
X/626 F1		
X/676 P1		
X/838 V1		
X/839 B1		
X/841 Y1	Nithard	Seen and recorded in China and Europe.
X/864 H1		
X/875 L1		
X/877 L1		Possible apparition of 153P/Ikeya–Zhang
X/891 J1		
X/941 R1		
X/975 P1		
X/998 D1		
X/1033 E1		
X/1034 S1		
X/1056 R1		
X/1106 C1		Kreutz sungrazer. The Great Comet of 1106
X/1273 G1		Possible apparition of 153P/Ikeya–Zhang
X/1338 G1		
X/1381 V1		
X/1391 J1		
X/1432 C1		
X/1491 B1		
X/1529 P1		
X/1569 V1		
X/1577 U1		
X/1621 B1		
X/1702 D1		Possible Kreutz sungrazer
X/1846 U1	Hind	
X/1872 X1	Pogson	Initially mistaken for the recovery of 3D/Biela
X/1882 K1	Tewfik	Kreutz sungrazer seen during the solar eclipse of May 17, 1882
C/1951 G1		
X/1951 G2		
X/1951 K1		Rediscovered in 2009 as 325P/Yang–Gao
X/1952 C1		
X/1954 C2		
X/1954 V1		
X/1954 V2		
X/1955 G2		
X/1975 J1		
X/1975 T3		
X/1976 U2		
X/1978 W1		
X/1979 O2		
X/1979 O3		
X/1987 A2		Rediscovered in 2020 as 449P/Leonard

== See also ==
- List of comets by type
  - List of numbered comets
  - List of periodic comets
  - List of Halley-type comets
  - List of long-period comets
  - List of near-parabolic comets
  - List of parabolic and hyperbolic comets
  - List of Kreutz sungrazers
