= List of comets by type =

This is a list of comets (bodies that travel in elliptical, parabolic, and sometimes hyperbolic orbits and display a tail behind them) listed by type. Comets are sorted into four categories: periodic comets (e.g. Halley's Comet), non-periodic comets (e.g. Comet Hale–Bopp), comets with no meaningful orbit (the Great Comet of 1106), and lost comets (5D/Brorsen), displayed as either P (periodic), C (non-periodic), X (no orbit), and D (lost).

Many of the earlier comets observed in history are designated with an X or D due to not having the tools to measure a comet's orbit accurately and eventually losing it. X/1106 C1 (the Great Comet of 1106) is a good example. The orbital elements for the older non-periodic comets in the list assume that the comet has an eccentricity of roughly 1; therefore, the calculations are only approximate.

== Guide To Comet Lists ==
- Hyperbolic comet list—Comets that are hyperbolic
- Near-parabolic comet list—Comets that have a period of over 1000 years
- Long-period comet list—Comets with a period between 200 and 1000 years
- List of periodic comets—Unnumbered comets with a period of less than 200 years
- List of numbered comets—Comets numbered by the Minor Planet Center
- Sungrazing comets
  - Kreutz sungrazers
  - Meyer group (below)
  - Kracht group (below)
  - Marsden group (below)
  - Ungrouped sungrazers (below)

After Edmond Halley recognized that several apparitions of a comet every 75.3 years were the same comet, it gave way to a new designation of periodic comets, with the first being named 1P/Halley. To date, there are 503 of these periodic comets, with many more on the way to getting an official designation.

== Non-periodic comets ==
Non-periodic comets are comets that have only been seen on one occasion, and/or comets that have periods of thousands of years. The following comets are organized by their described types:

=== Ejection-trajectory comets ===
These are comets with an eccentricity of at least 1 that they only made one pass through the Solar System. These comets are further divided into near-Parabolic and Hyperbolic comets. A hypothetical true parabolic comet would have an eccentricity of exactly 1, and hyperbolic comets are any comet with an eccentricity of over 1. But to know if a comet is truly hyperbolic the orbit must be calculated when it is outside of the planetary region of the Solar System. Most of the comets marked with an X are from the material cited here and the other comets are sourced from JPL Small-Body Database. Due to their hyperbolic orbits, it is impossible to determine where they come from, but it is expected that they are from the Oort Cloud, a cloud of icy bodies several thousand Astronomical units away from the Sun. However a few of these may be Interstellar comets

Comets observed in early times, which were later found to be observations of numbered periodic comets, are marked with [periodic comet number]/[comet name]. For instance, X/-239 K1 was an appearance of Halley's comet in 239 BC, and as such is written as 1P/-239 K1. A significant portion of the comets passing closer than 0.01 AU to the Sun are fragments of the comet of 371 BC, which fractured into several pieces on the 326 AD perihelion, which further fractured into thousands of pieces on the 1106 AD perihelion, creating the cometary group now known as the Kreutz sungrazers. Due to the sheer size (2000+ known members), and the fact that none of the group members have been given a numbered designation, the members are not stated on this list, and instead are listed in a separate list further below.

=== Near-parabolic comets ===
Comets with a very high eccentricity (generally 0.99 or higher) and a period of over 1,000 years that don't quite have a high enough velocity to escape the Solar System. Often, these comets, due to their extreme semimajor axes and eccentricity, will have orbital interactions with planets and minor planets, and often end up with the comets orbit changing significantly in their orbital period and aphelion distance from the Sun. These comets probably come from the Oort cloud, a cloud of comets orbiting the Sun from ~10,000 to roughly 50,000 AU.

== Lost comets ==
The following comets, assigned with a D before their name, were subsequently lost after their discovery, and often remain lost to this day:

Comet designation	Name/ discoverer(s)	e	a (AU)	q (AU)	i (°)	Last observed perihelion
D/1766 G1	Helfenzrieder	0.848	2.665	0.406	7.865	1766/04/27
D/1770 L1	Lexell's Comet	0.786	3.153	0.674	1.552	1770/08/14
D/1884 O1	Barnard	0.583	3.07	1.279	5.47	1884/08/16
D/1886 K1	Brooks	0.571	3.092	1.325	12.671	1886/06/07
D/1895 Q1	Swift	0.652	3.729	1.298	2.992	1895/08/21
D/1918 W1	Schorr	0.469	3.545	1.884	5.575	1918/09/30
D/1952 B1	Harrington–Wilson	0.514	3.428	1.6649	16.35	1951/10/30
D/1977 C1	Skiff–Kosai	0.259	3.847	2.85	3.201	1976/08/03
D/1978 R1	Haneda–Campos	0.6652	3.2898	1.101414	5.9472	1978/10/09

== Short period comets ==
=== Halley-type comets ===
Comets with a period between 20 and 200 years, named after the first identified member, Halley's Comet. These comets orbit between the orbit of Jupiter and Pluto, and are thought to be long-period comets that slowly migrated inwards, or Jupiter family comets that had been slingshotted outwards by Jupiter's gravity.

=== Unnumbered Jupiter-family comets ===
While Jupiter-family comets are officially defined by (2< T_{Jupiter} <3), they can also be loosely defined by any comet with a period of less than 20 years, a relatively low inclination, and an orbit coinciding loosely with that of Jupiter's. These comets are often patchily observed, as orbital interactions with the planet often cause comets' orbits to become perturbed, causing them to not be found at the expected position in the sky and subsequently lost.

==== D/1993 F2 (Shoemaker–Levy 9) ====
One such Jupiter-family comet, Comet Shoemaker–Levy 9, approached close enough to Jupiter sometime between the late 1960s and early 1970s, and was caught into orbit of it. By the comet's discovery, an extremely close approach with Jupiter one year previously had fractured the comet into many pieces, before it collided with Jupiter between 16 July and 22 July 1994. The fragments are listed separately here, at epoch 1994/05/08.

Size estimates for the comet's fragments were based on studies conducted by Erik Ian Asphaug and David A. Crawford respectively, where they concluded that the comet's original diameter was likely 1.4 ± 0.4 km (0.87 ± 0.25 mi) across.

Fragment	Period (years)	e	a (AU)	q (AU)	i (°)	Nucleus radii	Jupiter impact date
A	17.99	0.216209	6.86479	5.380563	6.00329	0.225 km	1994/07/16 20:11
B	17.97	0.215620	6.85975	5.380652	5.99022	0.19 km	1994/07/17 02:50
C	17.95	0.215169	6.85550	5.380411	5.98196		1994/07/17 07:12
D	17.93	0.214725	6.85158	5.380370	5.97297	0.1 km	1994/07/17 11:54
E	17.92	0.214411	6.84877	5.380318	5.96663	0.305 km	1994/07/17 15:11
F	17.90	0.213585	6.84163	5.380362	5.94846		1994/07/18 00:33
G	17.87	0.212881	6.83520	5.380112	5.93551	0.5 km	1994/07/18 07:32
H	17.83	0.211779	6.82547	5.379973	5.91287	0.33 km	1994/07/18 19:32
K	17.79	0.210425	6.81351	5.379775	5.88507	0.5 km	1994/07/19 10:21
L	17.75	0.209361	6.80416	5.379632	5.86313	0.635 km	1994/07/19 22:17
N	17.71	0.208277	6.79472	5.379536	5.84046	0.0225 km	1994/07/20 10:31
P1	17.69	0.207745	6.79035	5.379689	5.82929		1994/07/20 16:30
P2	17.70	0.207887	6.79147	5.379608	5.83126		1994/07/20 15:23
Q1	17.68	0.207405	6.78700	5.379348	5.82282	0.3 km	1994/07/20 20:12
Q2	17.68	0.207453	6.78749	5.379403	5.82361	0.025 km	1994/07/20 19:44
R	17.65	0.206581	6.77982	5.379232	5.80587	0.265 km	1994/07/21 05:33
S	17.63	0.205737	6.77248	5.379129	5.78848	0.32 km	1994/07/21 15:15
T	17.62	0.205504	6.77073	5.379319	5.78300		1994/07/21 18:10
U	17.61	0.205167	6.76764	5.379141	5.77631		1994/07/21 21:55
V	17.59	0.204616	6.76283	5.379046	5.76489		1994/07/22 04:22
W	17.58	0.204282	6.75982	5.378919	5.75982	0.245 km	1994/07/22 08:05

== Sungrazing comets ==
These comets have perihelion distances of less than 0.055 AU. Most belong to the Kreutz sungrazers, a group of comets split off from the Great Comet of 371 BC. There are also several other cometary groups, all much smaller, that occasionally pass through. This list covers all Sungrazing groups, including sporadic, or ungrouped sungrazers.

=== Kreutz sungrazers ===
The largest group of them all, the Kreutz sungrazers are a group of comets descended from the breakup of a comet in 371 BC. They live up to their name, typically traveling less than 2 solar radii from the Sun. Because they travel so close, they often burn up, and it is the cause of their breakup. Many bright comets are members of the group, including Comet Ikeya–Seki, which broke in 3 pieces.

=== Meyer group ===
This is the second largest sungrazing group, and the only one with no discerned period. Further observations of this group may eventually find one, however.

Comet designation	Name/ discoverer(s)	Period (years)	e	a (AU)	q (AU)	i (°)	Node (°)	Perihelion date
C/1996 N3	SOHO	–	1.0	–	0.0351	72.12	73.16	1996/07/03
C/1997 G7	SOHO	–	1.0	–	0.0351	70.33	73.94	1997/04/08
C/1997 H4	SOHO	–	1.0	–	0.0356	73.13	72.33	1997/04/21
C/1997 H5	SOHO	–	1.0	–	0.0371	79.18	69.13	1997/04/29
C/1997 L2	SOHO	–	1.0	–	0.0381	71.69	72.62	1997/06/10
C/1997 O2	SOHO	–	1.0	–	0.0356	71.92	73.07	1997/07/25
C/1997 U8	SOHO	–	1.0	–	0.031	71.91	71.15	1997/10/19
C/1997 X7	SOHO	–	1.0	–	0.0346	72.62	72.82	1997/12/15
C/1998 G9	SOHO	–	1.0	–	0.037	84.26	67.91	1998/04/12
C/1998 V8	SOHO	–	1.0	–	0.0363	72.01	72.88	1998/11/03
C/1998 W7	SOHO	–	1.0	–	0.0362	72.12	73.21	1998/11/28
C/1999 F3	SOHO	–	1.0	–	0.0363	73.31	72.36	1999/03/17
C/1999 K16	SOHO	–	1.0	–	0.0339	71.73	72.64	1999/05/26
C/1999 L9	SOHO	–	1.0	–	0.038	70.73	70.16	1999/06/09
C/1999 P7	SOHO	–	1.0	–	0.0372	71.32	73	1999/08/13
C/2000 B8	SOHO	–	1.0	–	0.034	70.75	75.09	2000/01/16
C/2000 C2	SOHO	–	1.0	–	0.037	71.35	73.71	2000/02/03
C/2000 C5	SOHO	–	1.0	–	0.0358	72.22	65.16	2000/02/07
C/2000 J8	SOHO	–	1.0	–	0.0367	72.5	73.65	2000/05/06
C/2000 N4	SOHO	–	1.0	–	0.0351	74.5	73.89	2000/07/04
C/2000 X9	SOHO	–	1.0	–	0.0386	72.66	73.96	2000/12/03
C/2001 C7	SOHO	–	1.0	–	0.035	73.68	54.75	2001/02/11
C/2001 E1	SOHO	–	1.0	–	0.0357	73.37	72.24	2001/03/15
C/2001 K11	SOHO	–	1.0	–	0.0339	72.36	73.28	2001/05/16
C/2001 L10	SOHO	–	1.0	–	0.0355	71.7	72.4	2001/06/01
C/2001 R7	SOHO	–	1.0	–	0.0372	73.77	85.28	2001/09/12
C/2001 T1	SOHO	–	1.0	–	0.0364	72.87	72.56	2001/10/09
C/2001 V6	SOHO	–	1.0	–	0.0374	69.76	73.64	2001/11/02
C/2001 X8	SOHO	–	1.0	–	0.0371	72.28	74.35	2001/12/12
C/2001 X10	SOHO	–	1.0	–	0.036	73.46	73.79	2001/12/15
C/2002 A4	SOHO	–	1.0	–	0.0366	72.13	75.45	2002/01/01
C/2002 H8	SOHO	–	1.0	–	0.0336	69.34	73.71	2002/04/20
C/2002 P3	SOHO	–	1.0	–	0.0359	73.84	75.81	2002/08/12
C/2002 R8	SOHO	–	1.0	–	0.0343	75.95	59.71	2002/09/15
C/2002 T2	SOHO	–	1.0	–	0.0369	70.94	70.73	2002/10/04
C/2002 U6	SOHO	–	1.0	–	0.0359	73.06	74.62	2002/10/28
C/2002 V4	SOHO	–	1.0	–	0.0357	72.5	74.75	2002/11/09
C/2002 X6	SOHO	–	1.0	–	0.0346	72.55	74.75	2002/12/02
C/2002 Y2	SOHO	–	1.0	–	0.04	73.52	74.51	2002/12/19
C/2003 B1	SOHO	–	1.0	–	0.0355	73.36	74.15	2003/01/17
C/2003 H5	SOHO	–	1.0	–	0.0351	71.35	75.17	2003/04/27
C/2003 K5	SOHO	–	1.0	–	0.0348	72.5	74.11	2003/05/21
C/2003 K6	SOHO	–	1.0	–	0.0372	71.87	73.67	2003/05/30
C/2003 U4	SOHO	–	1.0	–	0.0357	74.94	73.97	2003/10/21
C/2003 W2	SOHO	–	1.0	–	0.0314	73.26	74.96	2003/11/29
C/2003 Y1	SOHO	–	1.0	–	0.0354	72.81	74.7	2003/12/20
C/2004 B2	SOHO	–	1.0	–	0.0353	73.1	74.89	2004/01/29
C/2004 C2	SOHO	–	1.0	–	0.0325	72.92	74.6	2004/02/05
C/2004 G2	SOHO	–	1.0	–	0.0383	72.62	74.01	2004/04/10
C/2004 H4	SOHO	–	1.0	–	0.0343	67.87	74.62	2004/04/16
C/2004 H5	SOHO	–	1.0	–	0.0335	68.62	76.03	2004/04/30
C/2004 T2	SOHO	–	1.0	–	0.0346	73.67	72.45	2004/10/09
C/2004 U3	SOHO	–	1.0	–	0.0375	73.25	74.01	2004/10/18
C/2005 B4	SOHO	–	1.0	–	0.0353	71.69	71.69	2005/01/30
C/2005 C1	SOHO	–	1.0	–	0.0392	67.47	75.84	2005/02/02
C/2005 H2	SOHO	–	1.0	–	0.0362	78.83	72.43	2005/04/17
C/2005 H9	SOHO	–	1.0	–	0.0352	73.54	73.96	2005/04/29
C/2005 K4	SOHO	–	1.0	–	0.0373	73.25	74.48	2005/05/16
C/2005 K9	SOHO	–	1.0	–	0.0354	73.06	74.47	2005/05/28
C/2005 O5	SOHO	–	1.0	–	0.0361	74.41	67.93	2005/07/26
C/2005 Q2	SOHO	–	1.0	–	0.0377	74.51	76.48	2005/08/23
C/2005 Q8	SOHO	–	1.0	–	0.0377	72.42	77.2	2005/08/25
C/2005 T9	SOHO	–	1.0	–	0.0368	72.51	75.23	2005/10/08
C/2005 W9	SOHO	–	1.0	–	0.037	72.63	73.13	2005/11/19
C/2005 W11	SOHO	–	1.0	–	0.0396	76.08	72.71	2005/11/20
C/2005 Y8	SOHO	–	1.0	–	0.0338	73.75	74.29	2005/12/25
C/2006 B4	SOHO	–	1.0	–	0.0345	73.15	73.89	2006/01/26
C/2006 F6	SOHO	–	1.0	–	0.0333	74.13	75.03	2006/03/23
C/2006 J5	SOHO	–	1.0	–	0.0387	72.12	71.46	2006/05/08
C/2006 R3	SOHO	–	1.0	–	0.0337	75.14	66.29	2006/09/02
C/2006 T6	SOHO	–	1.0	–	0.0353	67.07	100.84	2006/10/10
C/2006 U10	SOHO	–	1.0	–	0.0346	71.68	74.91	2006/10/20
C/2006 X10	SOHO	–	1.0	–	0.0348	72.63	74.2	2006/12/15
C/2007 A6	SOHO	–	1.0	–	0.0382	70.57	70.67	2007/01/11
C/2007 C10	SOHO	–	1.0	–	0.0351	72.77	73.19	2007/02/07
C/2007 F4	SOHO	–	1.0	–	0.0347	71.41	76.09	2007/03/28
C/2007 J1	SOHO	–	1.0	–	0.0348	72.59	73.87	2007/05/02
C/2007 K12	SOHO	–	1.0	–	0.0346	72.52	73.94	2007/05/18
C/2007 R10	SOHO	–	1.0	–	0.037	75.8	73.16	2007/09/15
C/2007 U7	SOHO	–	1.0	–	0.0325	73.43	71.48	2007/10/27
C/2007 V10	SOHO	–	1.0	–	0.035	76.95	73.51	2007/11/09
C/2007 X7	SOHO	–	1.0	–	0.0378	71.98	73.58	2007/12/10
C/2007 X14	SOHO	–	1.0	–	0.0345	72.47	73.79	2007/12/14
C/2007 Y8	SOHO	–	1.0	–	0.0344	72.77	73.61	2007/12/28
C/2008 D6	SOHO	–	1.0	–	0.0338	70.85	72.5	2008/02/19
C/2008 F1	SOHO	–	1.0	–	0.0318	66.71	94.56	2008/03/20
C/2008 H4	SOHO	–	1.0	–	0.0373	73.46	72.35	2008/04/18
C/2008 J10	SOHO	–	1.0	–	0.0369	72.18	73.31	2008/05/07
C/2008 J12	SOHO	–	1.0	–	0.0379	70.94	71.57	2008/05/08
C/2023 F2	SOHO–4658	–	1.0	–	0.034	72.57	81.95	2023/03/21

=== Kracht group ===
This and the Marsden group, both are periodic, both with periods of approximately 3 years. They contain fewer members than the Meyer and Kreutz groups, probably as a result of their periodic nature, leading them to burn up more frequently. They are believed to be the parent bodies of the Southern Delta Aquariids meteor shower, occurring between July and August and usually having 15–20 meteors an hour.

Comet designation	Name/ discoverer(s)	Period (years)	e	a (AU)	q (AU)	i (°)	Node (°)	Perihelion date
C/1996 X3: P/2002 S7; C/2008 N4	SOHO-522; SOHO-1080; SOHO-1525	5.79	0.98496	3.22344	0.04849	13.6	50.3	2008/07/04
C/1996 X4	SOHO-1081	–	1.0	–	0.0492	13.7	50.79	1996/12/06
C/1996 X5: C/2002 S11; C/2008 R7	SOHO-526; SOHO-1082; SOHO-1526; SOHO-2802	–	1.0	–	0.049	13.78	51.28	2014/09/12
C/1999 M3	SOHO-402	–	1.0	–	0.0441	12.35	36.33	1999/06/30
C/1999 N6	SOHO-409	–	1.0	–	0.0435	12.15	32.5	1999/07/12
322P/SOHO: P/1999 R1; P/2003 R5; P/2007 R5; P/2011 R4	SOHO-85; SOHO-661	3.99	0.97869	2.516	0.0507	12.58	359.48	2023/08/21
342P/SOHO: P/2000 O3; P/2005 W4; P/2011 E1; P/2016 N5	SOHO-189; SOHO-1057; SOHO-2033; SOHO-3165	5.31	0.98260	3.04300	0.0529	13.27	43.4	2016/07/01
C/2001 Q7	SOHO-345	–	1.0	–	0.0445	13.28	43.95	2001/08/21
C/2001 Q8	SOHO-485	–	1.0	–	0.0451	13.07	44.76	2001/08/24
C/2001 R8	SOHO-487	–	1.0	–	0.0437	13.58	42.19	2001/09/06
C/2001 R9	SOHO-488	–	1.0	–	0.0472	12.47	48.9	2001/09/07
C/2002 N2	SOHO-501	–	1.0	–	0.049	13.8	52.93	2002/07/11
C/2002 Q8	SOHO-504	–	1.0	–	0.0479	13.7	50.38	2002/08/25
C/2002 Q10	SOHO-505	–	1.0	–	0.0484	13.54	50.99	2002/08/27
C/2002 R5: C/2008 L6; C/2008 L7	SOHO-513; SOHO-1487; SOHO-1488	5.77	0.98526	3.21612	0.0474	14.12	13.2	2008/06/10
C/2002 S4	SOHO-519	–	1.0	–	0.0484	13.51	50.81	2002/09/18
C/2002 S5	SOHO-520	–	1.0	–	0.0467	14.03	49.01	2002/09/19
C/2004 A3	SOHO-725	–	1.0	–	0.0433	14.75	44.75	2004/01/16
C/2004 B3: C/2009 Y10	SOHO-727; SOHO-1770; SOHO-3081; SOHO-4464	–	1.0	–	0.0515	13.28	44.9	2022/01/02
C/2004 J4	SOHO-770	–	1.0	–	0.0417	12.35	34.3	2004/05/05
C/2004 J12	SOHO-777	–	1.0	–	0.0398	12.68	33.75	2004/05/12
C/2004 J13	SOHO-779	–	1.0	–	0.0441	12.47	36.12	2004/05/13
C/2004 J15	SOHO-780	–	1.0	–	0.0438	12.28	34.56	2004/05/14
C/2004 J16	SOHO-781	–	1.0	–	0.0314	14.63	34.39	2004/05/14
C/2004 J17	SOHO-782	–	1.0	–	0.0356	13.79	35.6	2004/05/15
C/2004 J18	SOHO-783	–	1.0	–	0.0461	11.89	34.23	2004/05/15
C/2004 J20	SOHO-1271	–	1.0	–	0.0419	12.76	35.86	2004/05/13
C/2004 L10	SOHO-842	–	1.0	–	0.0431	12.54	35.76	2004/06/14
C/2008 E4	SOHO-1446	–	1.0	–	0.0499	13.13	51.85	2008/03/03
C/2008 G6	SOHO-1454	–	1.0	–	0.0483	14.35	49.13	2008/04/13
C/2009 L8	SOHO-1664	–	–	–	0.0414	–	–	2009/06/07
C/2010 U11	SOHO-1936	–	–	–	–	–	–	2010/10/22
P/2011 E1	SOHO-2033	–	–	–	0.0534	–	–	2011/03/09
–	SOHO-2225	–	–	–	–	–	–	2012/01/18
–	SOHO-2624	–	–	–	–	–	–	2013/11/09
–	SOHO-2673	–	–	–	–	–	–	2014/03/07
–	SOHO-2712	–	–	–	–	–	–	2014/03/07
–	SOHO-2779	–	–	–	–	–	–	2014/07/24
–	SOHO-3722	–	–	–	–	–	–	2019/04/24
–	SOHO-3870	–	–	–	–	–	–	2019/11/27
–	SOHO-3877; SOHO-4837	–	–	–	–	–	–	2025/08/26
–	SOHO-3882	–	–	–	–	–	–	2019/12/12
–	SOHO-3885	–	–	–	–	–	–	2019/12/19
–	SOHO-3943	–	–	–	–	–	–	2014/06/06
–	SOHO-3952	–	–	–	–	–	–	2019/02/25
–	SOHO-4039	–	–	–	–	–	–	2015/01/18
–	SOHO-4040	–	–	–	–	–	–	2015/03/02
–	SOHO-4055	–	–	–	–	–	–	2020/08/24

=== Marsden group ===
Comet designation	Name/ discoverer(s)	Period (years)	e	a (AU)	q (AU)	i (°)	Node (°)	Perihelion date
C/1996 V2: C/2002 V5	SOHO-930; SOHO-2825	–	1.0	–	0.0488	33.41	89.36	2020/11/01
C/1997 B5	SOHO-1083	–	1.0	–	0.0512	25.1	78	1997/01/29
C/1997 B6	SOHO-1084	–	1.0	–	0.0501	24.95	76.41	1997/01/29
C/1997 B7	SOHO-1085	–	1.0	–	0.049	24.78	74.98	1997/01/29
C/1998 A2	SOHO-404	–	1.0	–	0.041	27.93	80.78	1998/01/03
C/1998 A3	SOHO-407	–	1.0	–	0.0419	27.35	80.73	1998/01/09
C/1998 A4	SOHO-406	–	1.0	–	0.0431	26.87	81.03	1998/01/10
P/1999 J6: C/2004 V9; C/2010 H3	SOHO-109; SOHO-859; SOHO-1828	5.456	0.98423	3.098	0.0489	26.629	81.598	2015/09/26
C/1999 N5	SOHO-408	–	1.0	–	0.0496	27.08	82.49	1999/07/11
C/1999 P6	SOHO-411	–	1.0	–	0.0494	26.57	82.01	1999/08/05
C/1999 P8	SOHO-413	–	1.0	–	0.0494	26.56	81.85	1999/08/14
C/1999 P9	SOHO-414	–	1.0	–	0.0493	26.55	81.74	1999/08/15
C/1999 U2	SOHO-90	–	1.0	–	0.049	27	82.1	1999/10/25
C/2000 C3	SOHO-102	–	1.0	–	0.0487	24.97	81.85	2000/02/04
C/2000 C4: C/2005 W1	SOHO-101; SOHO-1048; SOHO-2115	–	1.0	–	0.0487	24.97	81.95	2022/07/19
C/2000 C7	SOHO-441	–	1.0	–	0.0481	24.89	81.06	2000/02/04
C/2002 R1: C/2008 A3	SOHO-511; SOHO-1429	–	1.0	–	0.0492	22.19	70.43	2013/05/25
C/2008 A3	SOHO	–	1.0	–	0.0493	22.28	70.18	2008/01/15
C/2002 R4: C/2007 Y4	SOHO-512; SOHO-1422; SOHO-3139	–	1.0	–	0.052	28.31	85.69	2023/12/09
C/2003 Q6	SOHO-656	–	1.0	–	0.0366	25.43	56.3	2003/08/26
C/2004 V10	SOHO	–	1.0	–	0.0488	26.4	81.86	2004/11/08
C/2004 W10	SOHO	–	1.0	–	0.0467	25.97	82.11	2004/11/29
C/2005 E4	SOHO	–	1.0	–	0.0487	26.43	80.6	2005/03/10
C/2005 G2	SOHO	–	1.0	–	0.0492	26.84	80.69	2005/04/14
C/2005 W5	SOHO	–	1.0	–	0.0494	26.91	81.77	2005/11/29
C/2006 E2	SOHO	–	1.0	–	0.0482	24.5	80.94	2006/03/15
C/2006 F3	SOHO	–	1.0	–	0.051	23.02	85.31	2006/03/25
–	SOHO-2071; SOHO-4192; SOHO-4848	–	–	–	–	–	–	2021/05/15
–	SOHO-2263; SOHO-3524; SOHO-4989	–	–	–	–	–	–	2024/05/06

=== Ungrouped sungrazers ===
Comet designation	Name/ discoverer(s)	Period (years)	e	a (AU)	q (AU)	i (°)	Node (°)	Perihelion date
C/1680 V1	Great Comet of 1680	9370	0.999986	444.4285	0.006222	60.6784	276.6339	1680/12/18
C/1695 U1		–	1.0	–	0.0423	93.589	286.018	1695/10/23
C/1816 B1	Pons	–	1.0	–	0.0485	43.111	325.829	1816/03/01
C/1826 U1	Pons	–	1.0	–	0.026904	90.6234	237.5505	1826/11/18
C/1847 C1	Hind	10300	0.99991	473.2556	0.042593	48.6636	23.824	1847/03/30
C/1865 B1	Great Southern Comet	–	1.0	–	0.025844	92.4945	254.8252	1865/01/14
C/1961 O1	Wilson–Hubbard	34410	0.999962	1057.8684	0.040199	24.2116	298.9545	1961/07/17
C/1962 C1	Seki–Lines	–	1.000003	–	0.031397	65.0142	304.6776	1962/04/01
C/1997 B4	SOHO-923	–	1.0	–	0.0573	132.78	56.20	1997/01/21
C/1997 H2	SOHO-8	–	1.0	–	0.1361	18.32	225.82	1997/05/03
321P/SOHO: P/1997 J6; P/2001 D1; P/2004 X7; P/2008 S2; P/2012 M2	SOHO-478; SOHO-879; SOHO-1532	3.78	0.98108	2.425409	0.04589	20.1	165.2	2016/04/10
C/1997 S4	SOHO-466	–	1.0	–	0.026	154.63	135.76	1997/09/29
C/1997 V7	SOHO-929	–	1.0	–	0.0216	137.4	157.78	1997/11/03
C/1997 V9	SOHO-929	–	1.0	–	0.0611	93.76	219.17	1997/11/14
C/1998 G3	SOHO-46	–	1.0	–	0.0354	53.86	322.5	1998/04/12
323P/SOHO: P/1999 X3; P/2004 E2; P/2008 K10; P/2012 K2	SOHO-746; SOHO-1157; SOHO-1483	4.22	0.98173	2.610537	0.04770	6.5	322.2	2008/05/31
C/1999 Y2	SOHO	–	1.0	–	0.0483	111.42	235.5	1999/12/28
C/2000 J2	SOHO	–	1.0	–	0.0335	146.61	32.19	2000/05/08
C/2000 V4	SOHO	–	1.0	–	0.0503	54.97	324.91	2000/11/11
C/2000 Y6	SOHO	–	1.0	–	0.0252	87.3	229.47	2000/12/20
C/2000 Y7	SOHO	–	1.0	–	0.0245	89.02	228.93	2000/12/20
C/2001 C5	SOHO	–	1.0	–	0.0256	166.26	322.52	2001/02/13
C/2001 N1	SOHO	–	1.0	–	0.0052	95.09	302.92	2001/07/06
C/2001 P1	SOHO	–	1.0	–	0.0113	29.9	140.14	2001/08/05
C/2001 Q3	SOHO	–	1.0	–	0.0373	106.63	155.03	2001/08/26
C/2001 T5	SOHO	–	1.0	–	0.0476	55.26	327.74	2001/10/15
C/2002 G1	SOHO	–	1.0	–	0.0339	133.92	106.02	2002/04/02
C/2002 Q6	SOHO	–	1.0	–	0.0103	65.96	70.92	2002/08/23
C/2002 Q9	SOHO	–	1.0	–	0.0304	22.45	19.58	2002/08/19
C/2003 G3	SOHO	–	1.0	–	0.0168	169.7	87.61	2003/04/05
C/2003 H6	SOHO	–	1.0	–	0.0264	27.05	243.47	2003/04/30
C/2003 H7	SOHO	–	1.0	–	0.0266	27.9	242.66	2003/04/30
C/2003 K3	SOHO	–	1.0	–	0.13918	39.529	79.076	2003/06/01
C/2003 Q1	SOHO	–	1.0	–	0.032	29.33	43.43	2003/08/20
C/2003 R4	SOHO	–	1.0	–	0.0316	92.36	173.06	2003/09/06
C/2003 S9	SOHO	–	1.0	–	0.0154	28.79	59.32	2003/09/25
C/2004 Y10	SOHO	–	1.0	–	0.0322	131.61	129.68	2004/12/28
C/2005 C4	SOHO	–	1.0	–	0.0391	40.06	7.79	2005/02/13
C/2005 D1	SOHO	–	1.0	–	0.0468	121.76	284.06	2005/02/23
C/2007 C12	SOHO	–	1.0	–	0.0408	122.22	285.89	2007/02/09
C/2005 H7	SOHO	–	1.0	–	0.0127	73.07	354.66	2005/04/25
C/2005 M3	SOHO	–	1.0	–	0.0355	88.99	140.98	2005/06/19
C/2005 Q3	SOHO	–	1.0	–	0.0253	43.52	70.89	2005/08/30
C/2005 Q6	SOHO	–	1.0	–	0.0387	50.4	156.59	2005/08/19
C/2005 V8	SOHO	–	1.0	–	0.0266	75.64	341.92	2005/11/09
C/2006 K5	SOHO	–	1.0	–	0.0512	117.6	169.23	2006/05/23
C/2007 A7	SOHO	–	1.0	–	0.0191	144.23	284.7	2007/01/10
C/2007 C7	SOHO	–	1.0	–	0.0172	70.99	309.4	2007/02/02
C/2007 M8	SOHO	–	1.0	–	0.0478	82.04	288.26	2007/06/25
C/2007 X1	SOHO	–	1.0	–	0.0272	129.2	156.13	2007/12/03
C/2008 C3	SOHO	–	1.0	–	0.0346	158.24	30.07	2008/02/03
C/2008 E7	SOHO	–	1.0	–	0.0548	143.28	12.08	2008/03/05
P/2008 Y12: P/2014 K3	SOHO-1594; SOHO-2730	5.4	0.9787	3.07822	0.0654	23.35	312.6	2008/12/22
C/2012 S1	ISON	–	1.00001	–	0.0125	62.613	295.69	2013/11/28
P/2015 D1	SOHO-2875	11	0.9943	4.9	0.02832	69.92	95.88	2015/02/19
C/2015 P3	SWAN (SOHO-2992)	3879	0.99710	246.69	0.7152	58.184	88.145	2015/07/27
C/2021 D1	SWAN (SOHO-4139)	947	0.99065	96.437	0.8945	31.461	311.27	2021/02/27
–	SOHO-2959	–	–	–	–	–	–	2014/06/03
–	SOHO-2763	–	–	–	–	–	–	2014/06/29
–	SOHO-2767	–	–	–	–	–	–	2014/07/04
–	SOHO-2775	–	–	–	–	–	–	2014/07/16
–	SOHO-2784	–	–	–	–	–	–	2014/08/01
–	SOHO-2792	–	–	–	–	–	–	2014/08/25
–	SOHO-2793	–	–	–	–	–	–	2014/11/20
–	SOHO-2836	–	–	–	–	–	–	2014/11/20
–	SOHO-2844	–	–	–	–	–	–	2014/12/02
–	SOHO-2851	–	–	–	–	–	–	2014/12/09
–	SOHO-2863	–	–	–	–	–	–	2015/01/21
–	SOHO-2890	–	–	–	–	–	–	2015/03/11
–	SOHO-2891	–	–	–	–	–	–	2015/03/11
–	SOHO-2909	–	–	–	–	–	–	2015/04/07
–	SOHO-2942	–	–	–	–	–	–	2015/05/07
–	SOHO-2985	–	–	–	–	–	–	2015/07/12
–	SOHO-3003	–	–	–	–	–	–	2015/09/14
–	SOHO-3014	–	–	–	–	–	–	2015/10/03
–	SOHO-3019	–	–	–	–	–	–	2015/10/14
–	SOHO-3105	–	–	–	–	–	–	2016/03/20
–	SOHO-3151	–	–	–	–	–	–	2016/06/12
–	SOHO-3157	–	–	–	–	–	–	2016/07/19
–	SOHO-3174	–	–	–	–	–	–	2016/07/19
–	SOHO-3311	–	–	–	–	–	–	2017/04/28
–	SOHO-3350	–	–	–	–	–	–	2017/06/18
–	SOHO-3395	–	–	–	–	–	–	2017/08/24
–	SOHO-3416	–	–	–	–	–	–	2017/10/04
–	SOHO-3435	–	–	–	–	–	–	2017/10/27
–	SOHO-3534	–	–	–	–	–	–	2018/05/09
–	SOHO-3539	–	–	–	–	–	–	2018/05/21
–	SOHO-3604	–	–	–	–	–	–	2018/09/22
–	SOHO-3651	–	–	–	–	–	–	2018/11/18
–	SOHO-3667	–	–	–	–	–	–	2018/12/07
–	SOHO-3679	–	–	–	–	–	–	2019/01/18
–	SOHO-3704	–	–	–	–	–	–	2016/05/16
–	SOHO-3705	–	–	–	–	–	–	2016/07/29
–	SOHO-3783	–	–	–	–	–	–	2015/07/15
–	SOHO-3784	–	–	–	–	–	–	2015/07/08
–	SOHO-3789	–	–	–	–	–	–	2018/04/05
–	SOHO-3790	–	–	–	–	–	–	2018/04/21
–	SOHO-3793	–	–	–	–	–	–	2016/12/07
–	SOHO-3800	–	–	–	–	–	–	2019/07/14
–	SOHO-3804	–	–	–	–	–	–	2019/07/19
–	SOHO-3819	–	–	–	–	–	–	2019/08/26
–	SOHO-3853	–	–	–	–	–	–	2019/11/05
–	SOHO-3893	–	–	–	–	–	–	2020/01/23
–	SOHO-3945	–	–	–	–	–	–	2016/02/19
–	SOHO-3968	–	–	–	–	–	–	2020/05/21
–	SOHO-4046	–	–	–	–	–	–	2020/08/05
–	SOHO-4047	–	–	–	–	–	–	2020/08/06
–	SOHO-4049	–	–	–	–	–	–	2020/08/07
–	SOHO-4059	–	–	–	–	–	–	2020/09/06
–	SOHO-4080	–	–	–	–	–	–	2020/10/26
–	SOHO-4120	–	–	–	–	–	–	2021/01/17
–	SOHO-4122	–	–	–	–	–	–	2021/01/21
–	SOHO-4124	–	–	–	–	–	–	2017/02/24
–	SOHO-4132	–	–	–	–	–	–	2021/02/15
–	SOHO-4134	–	–	–	–	–	–	2021/02/19
