= Gao Xing =

Chinese astronomer (born 1974)

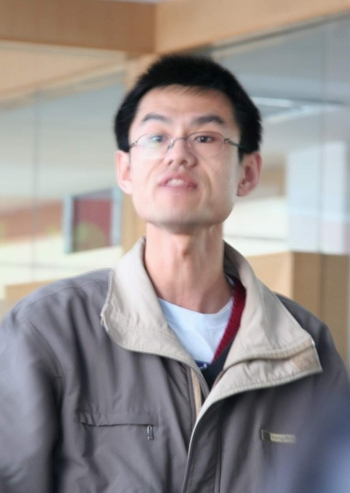
- Gao in 2008
- Born: 1974 (age 51–52); Ürümqi, China
- Scientific career
- Fields: Astronomy

Gao Xing (Chinese: 高兴; pinyin: Gāo Xìng; born 1974) is a Chinese amateur astronomer from Ürümqi, Xinjiang, China. (Astronomers name: Gaoxing) He built Xingming Observatory (星明天文台) in 2006 and discovered Comet C/2008 C1 (Chen-Gao) on February 1, 2008 with Chen Tao from Jiangsu and Comet P/2009 L2 (Yang-Gao) on June 15, 2009 with Yang Rui from Hangzhou, Zhejiang and Comet C/2015 F5 (SWAN-Xingming) on April 4, 2015 with Guoyou Sun from Wenzhou, Zhejiang, China (...?) and hence won the Edgar Wilson Award for 2008. (He won Edgar Wilson Award unter that for 2015 3 times.)

In the night on February 26, 2009, he discovered a nova in Sagittarius in the Galaxy's central part at night with his partner Sun Guoyou from Wenzhou. Gao reported his new discovery to the International Astronomical Union on May 29 and acquired the identification. On the night of October 3, 2010, he discovered a new supernova in NGC5430 at night with his partner Sun Guoyou. He also discovered several SOHO comets and NEAT asteroids. Currently, he is working as a physics teacher at the Urumqi No.1 High School. In 2017 he was awarded the Gordon Myers Amateur Achievement Award.

== See also ==
- Urumqi No.1 High School
