= No.1 Senior High School of Ürümqi =

High school in Xinjiang Uyghur Autonomous Region, China

No. 1 Senior High School of Ürümqi
- 乌鲁木齐市第一中学 ئۈرۈمچى شەھەرلىك 1-ئوتتۇرا مەكتەپ
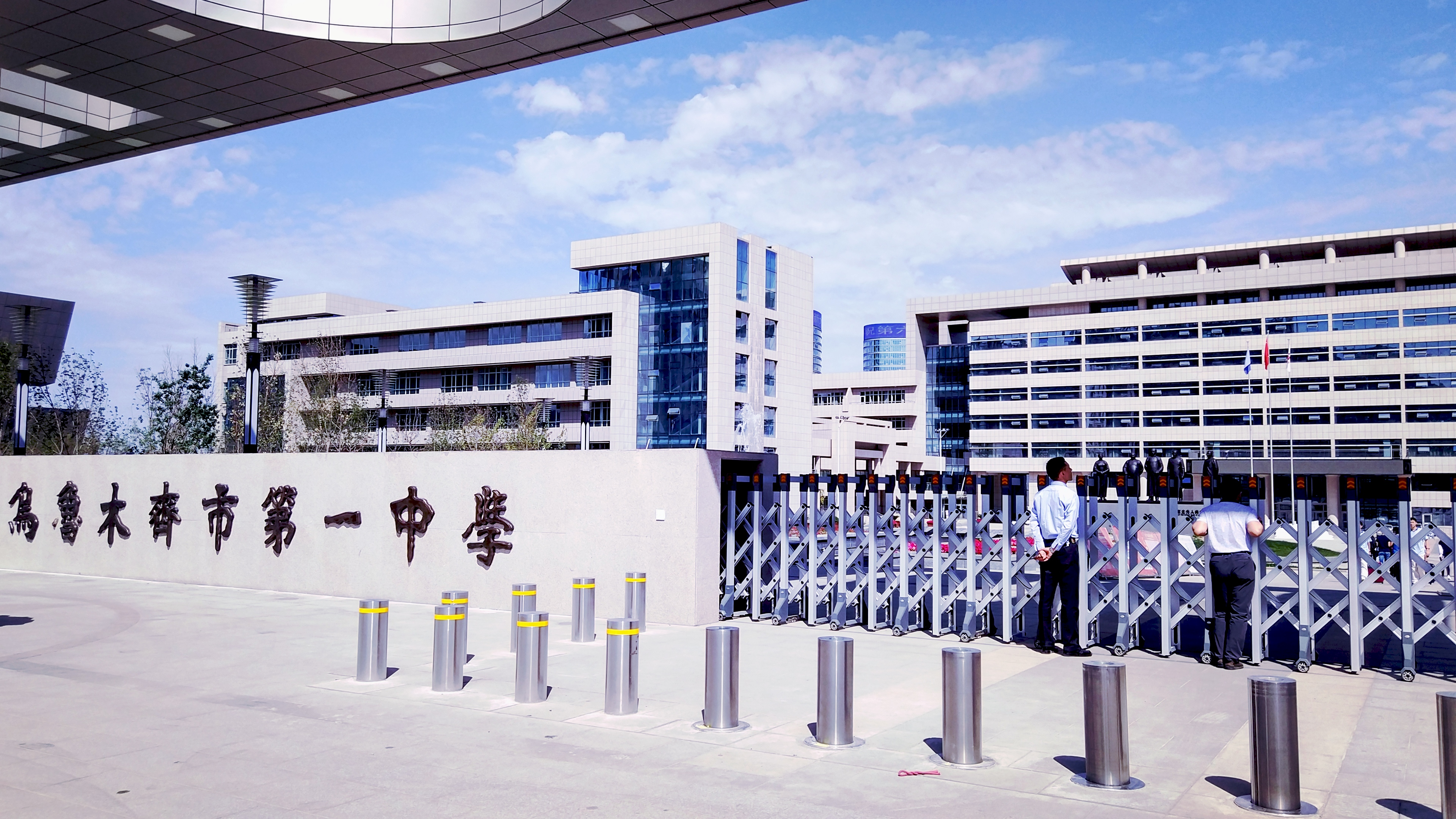
- The Front Gate of Urumqi No. 1 High School, Lvgu Campus

Location
- Toutunhe District; Urumqi; China
- Coordinates: 43.79798°N 87.61942°E

Information
- Type: Public
- Motto: 厚德、砺志、博学
- Established: 1891
- Principal: Luo Qunyan (罗群雁)
- Staff: 155
- Enrollment: 2132
- Colors: Blue, White
- Nickname: Yizhong (一中)
- Affiliations: Key high schools in Urumqi
- Website: Official website

The No. 1 Senior High School of Ürümqi (simplified Chinese: 乌鲁木齐市第一中学; traditional Chinese: 烏魯木齊市第一中學; pinyin: Wūlǔmùqí Shì Dìyīzhōngxué, Uyghur: ئۈرۈمچى شەھەرلىك 1-ئوتتۇرا مەكتەپ, Үрүмчи Шеһерлик Биринчи Оттура Мектеп, romanized: Ürümchi Sheherlik Birinchi Ottura Mektep), literally Ürümqi No. 1 High School, colloquially abbreviated as "乌鲁木齐一中" or "乌市一中", sometimes called No. 1 Middle School of Urumqi, is a public high school in Ürümqi, Xinjiang Uyghur Autonomous Region, China, under the jurisdiction of the Urumqi Municipal Education Bureau. Founded in 1891 during the Qing dynasty, it is the oldest school in Xinjiang.

Located in the downtown Bei Men (北门) at Jiankang Road (健康路) and North Jiefang Road (解放北路) in Tianshan District, Urumqi, the school is the accredited top-ranking high school in Urumqi city and in Xinjiang, and is considered a typical instance of local secondary education. All of the courses are in Chinese. The students are predominantly Han Chinese, with other ethnic groups including Hui, Uyghur, Kazakh, Mongol, etc.

Starting from August, 2024, the school begin using the new campus located in the Xi'er Street(西二巷) of Kanasihubei Road(喀纳斯湖北路). With an investment of more than 551 million yuan, the new campus covers an area of 14.5547 hectares and contains two Teaching Buildings, two Science Buildings(with three floors of Library), one Office Building, one Art Building, one Astronomy-Music Integrated Building, one Stadium, three Dormitory Buildings, one Standard Soccer Field, and one Dining Hall Building.

== History ==
The institutional predecessor, known as Bo Da Academy of Sinkiang (simplified Chinese: 新疆博达书院/博大书院; traditional Chinese: 新疆博達書院/博大書院)(lit. Sinkiang Academy of Erudition), was founded on August 14, 1891, by the then Qing dynasty, when it was 20 years before the establishment of the Republic of China.

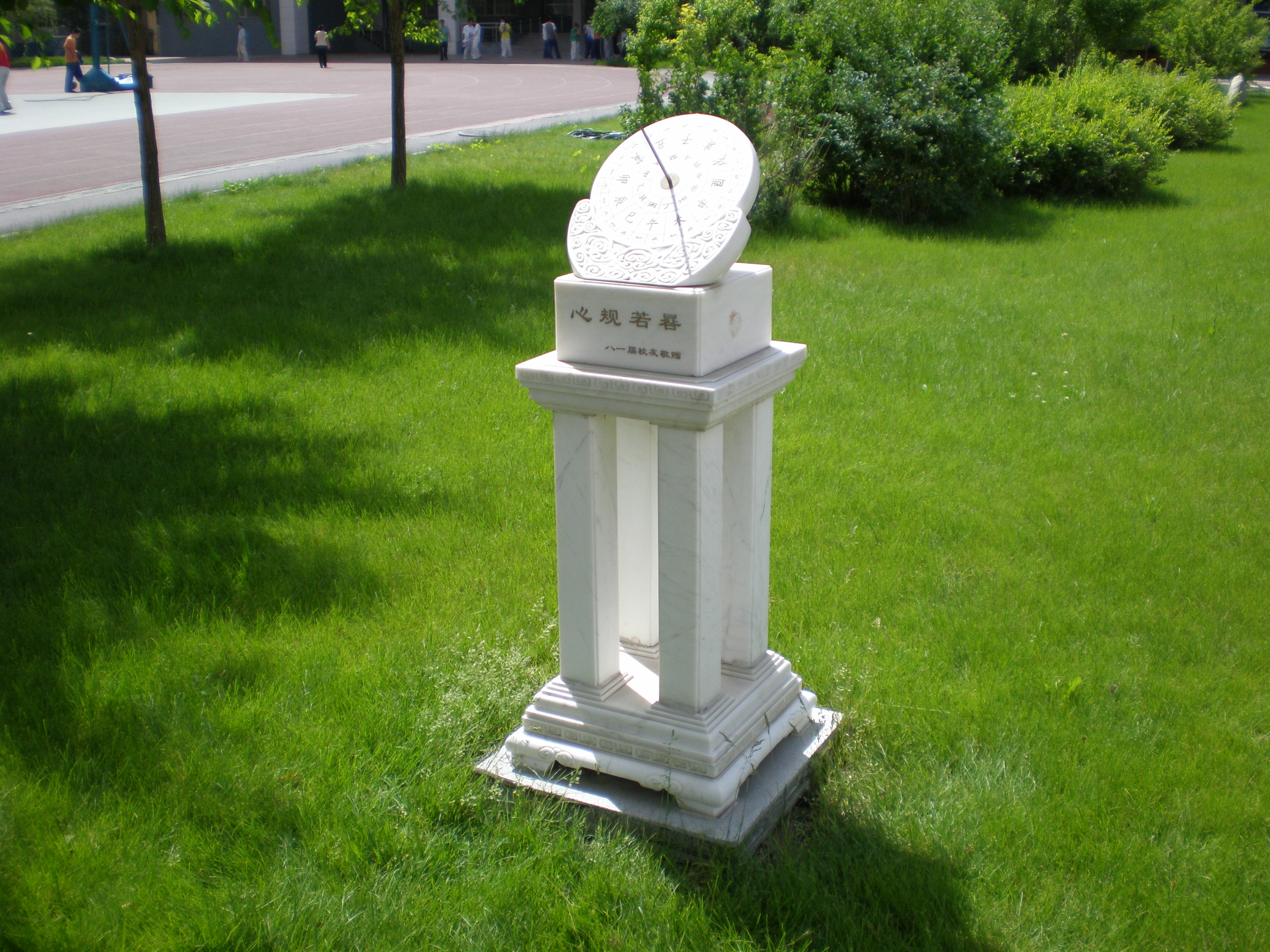
Xin Gui Ruo Gui (心规若晷) sundial presented by the 1981 graduates Symbolic front gate, exposed to North Jiefang Road (解放北路) side, Urumqi

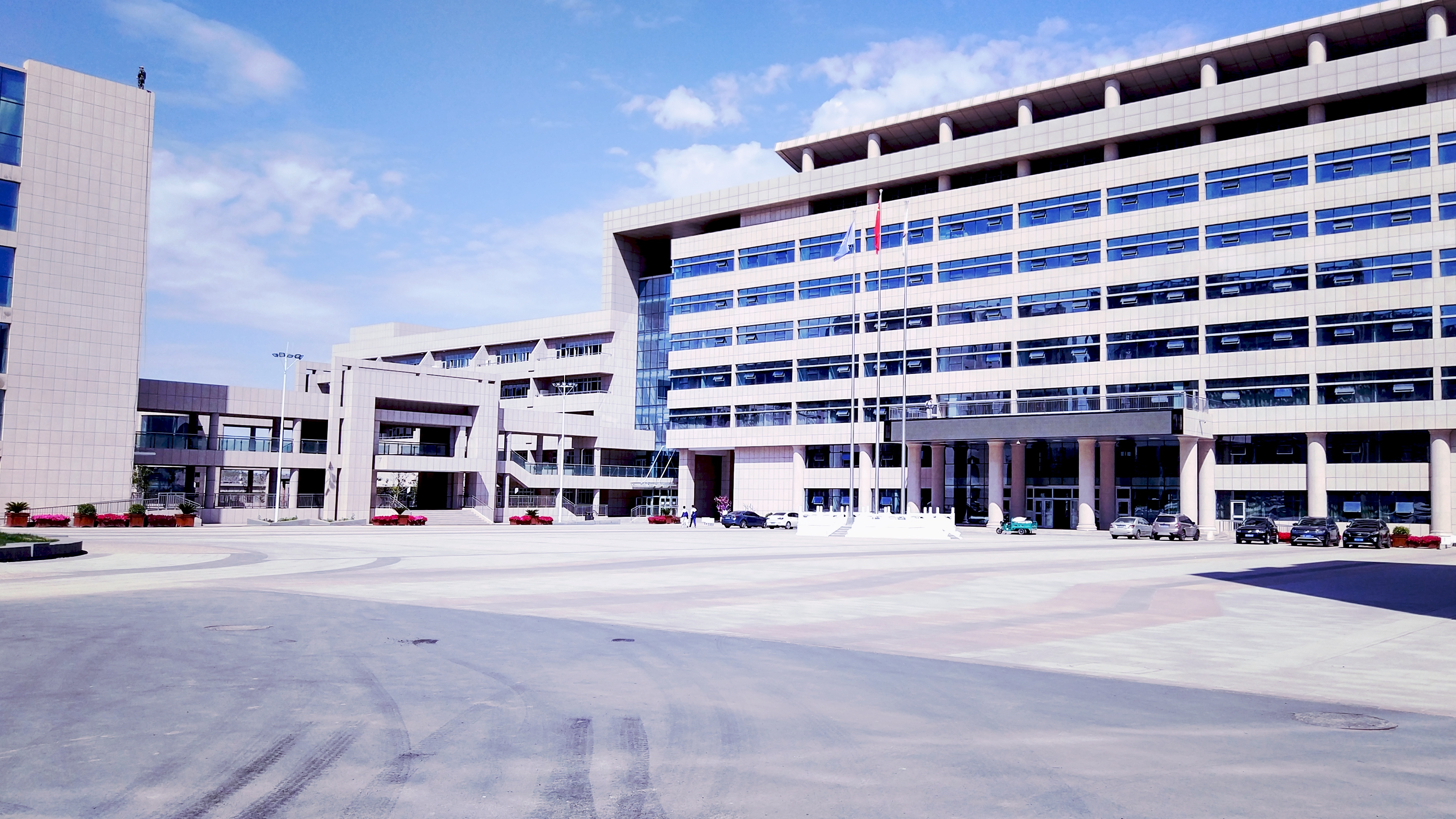
The New Campus

In 2004, a civil North School of the No. 1 Senior High School of Urumqi (乌鲁木齐市第一中学北校) was founded by the school authorities and their collaborative company known as Xinjiang Jun Fa Industrial & Investment Co. Ltd (新疆俊发实业投资有限责任公司).

Starting from August 2017, the school begin using the new campus located in the Xi'er Street (西二巷) of Kanasihubei Road(喀纳斯湖北路).

== Facilities ==
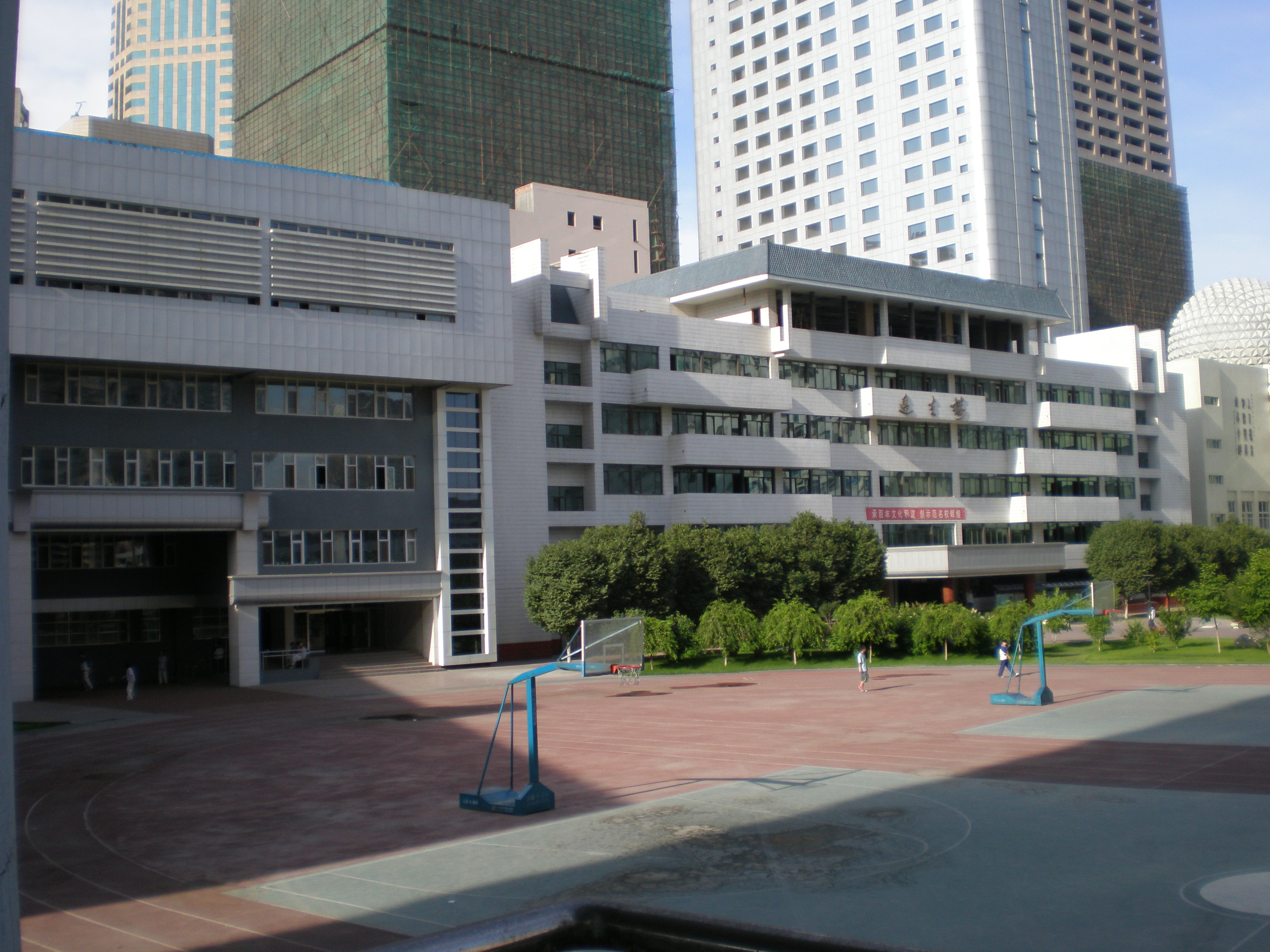
Urumqi No. 1 High School buildings on campus

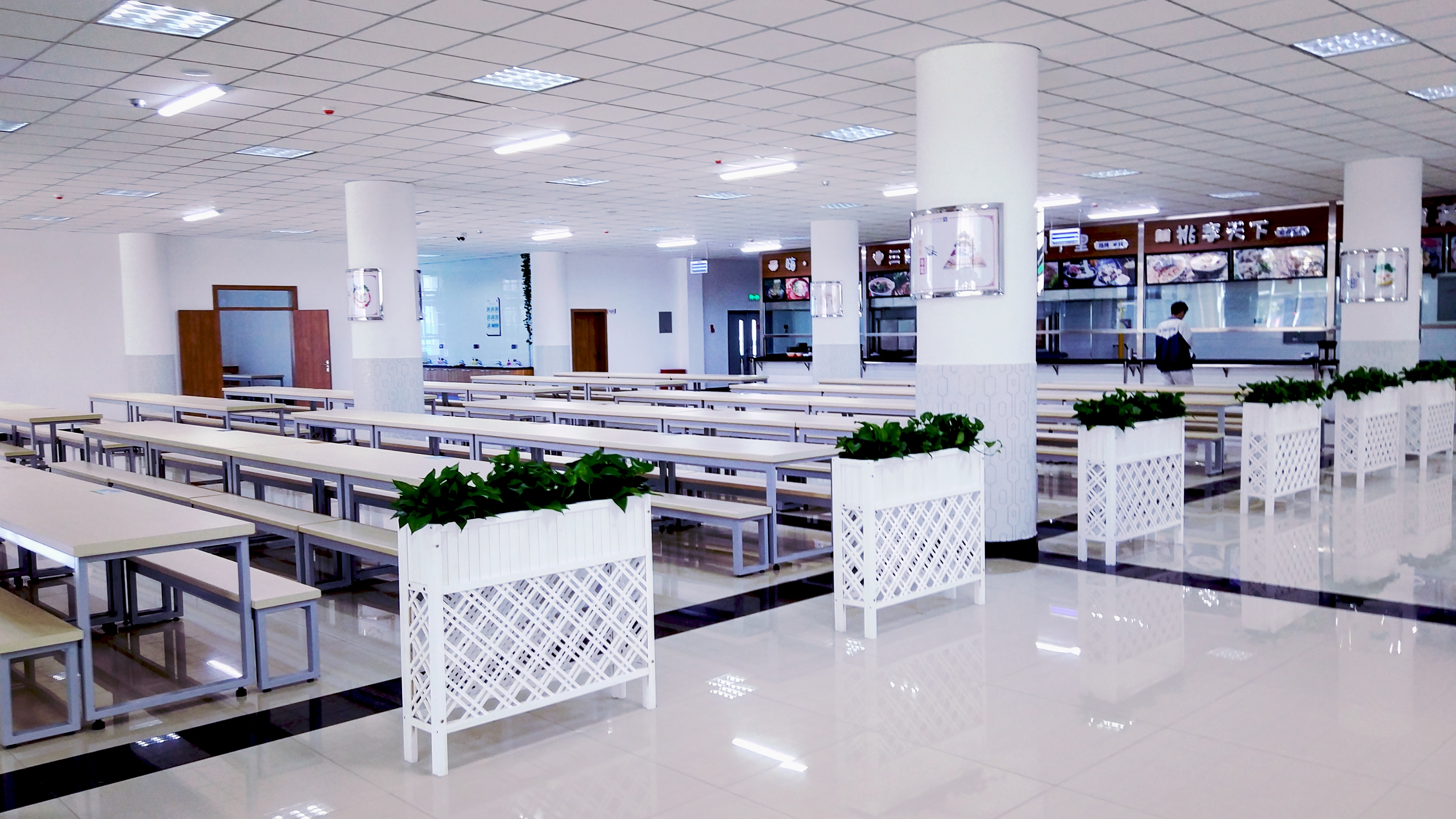
The new Dining Hall has three floors, capable of serving 3,000 people at the same time.

In 2017, the school moved to the Green-Valley Campus(绿谷校区). With an investment of more than 551 million yuan, the new campus covers an area of 14.5547 hectares and contains two Teaching Buildings, two Science Buildings(with three floors of Library), one Office Building, one Art Building, one Astronomy-Music Integrated Building, one Stadium, three Dormitory Buildings, one Standard Soccer Field, and one Dining Hall Building.

=== Library ===
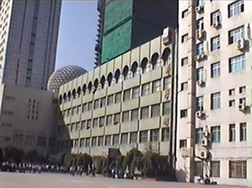
Science Building before renovation, September 2006

The school library is set in the Science Building and has over 90,000 books in store, offering thousands of magazines and newspapers in nearly 520 kinds. The former school library was the oldest high school library in Xinjiang. According to the school chronicles, the library had 5,641 books in 1931, making one of the most famous in the province (Xinjiang was formerly a province during ROC period). In 1966, the number of stored books turned 40,000; however, the Cultural Revolution (1966–1976) made an end to it, all its stored books having been looted.

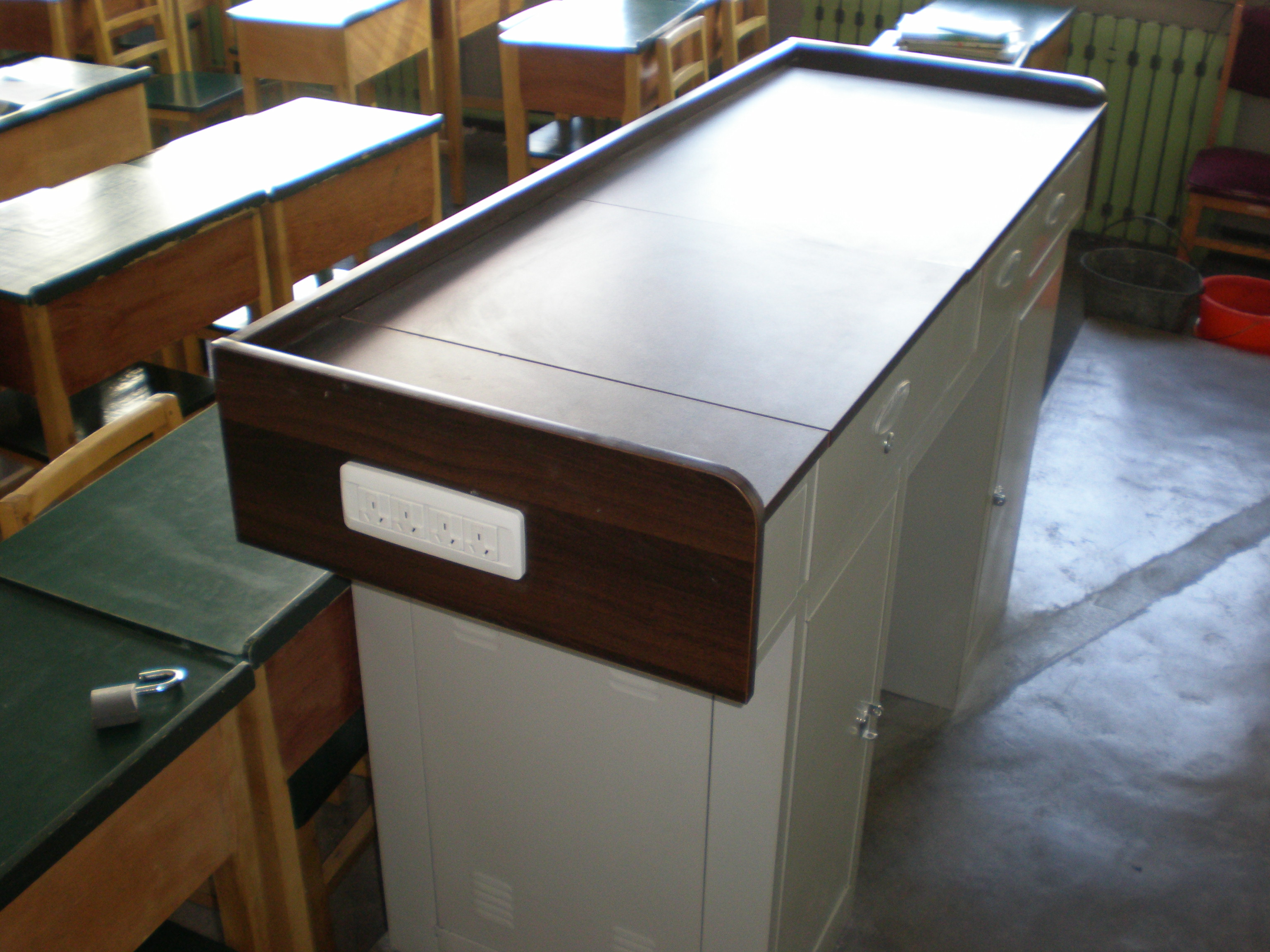
Computer-installed platform desk

In the late 1970s, the library was reestablished and underwent massive development during the 1980s. The present school library was built in 1989. The library currently occupies 802.12 m^{2} in area, with 195 seats in the reading room, available for 2 classes at the same time. It provides Senior 3 students with a room for individual study (自习室). Three librarians are in charge of the library.

The General Library Integrated System was adopted and put into service in September 2004.

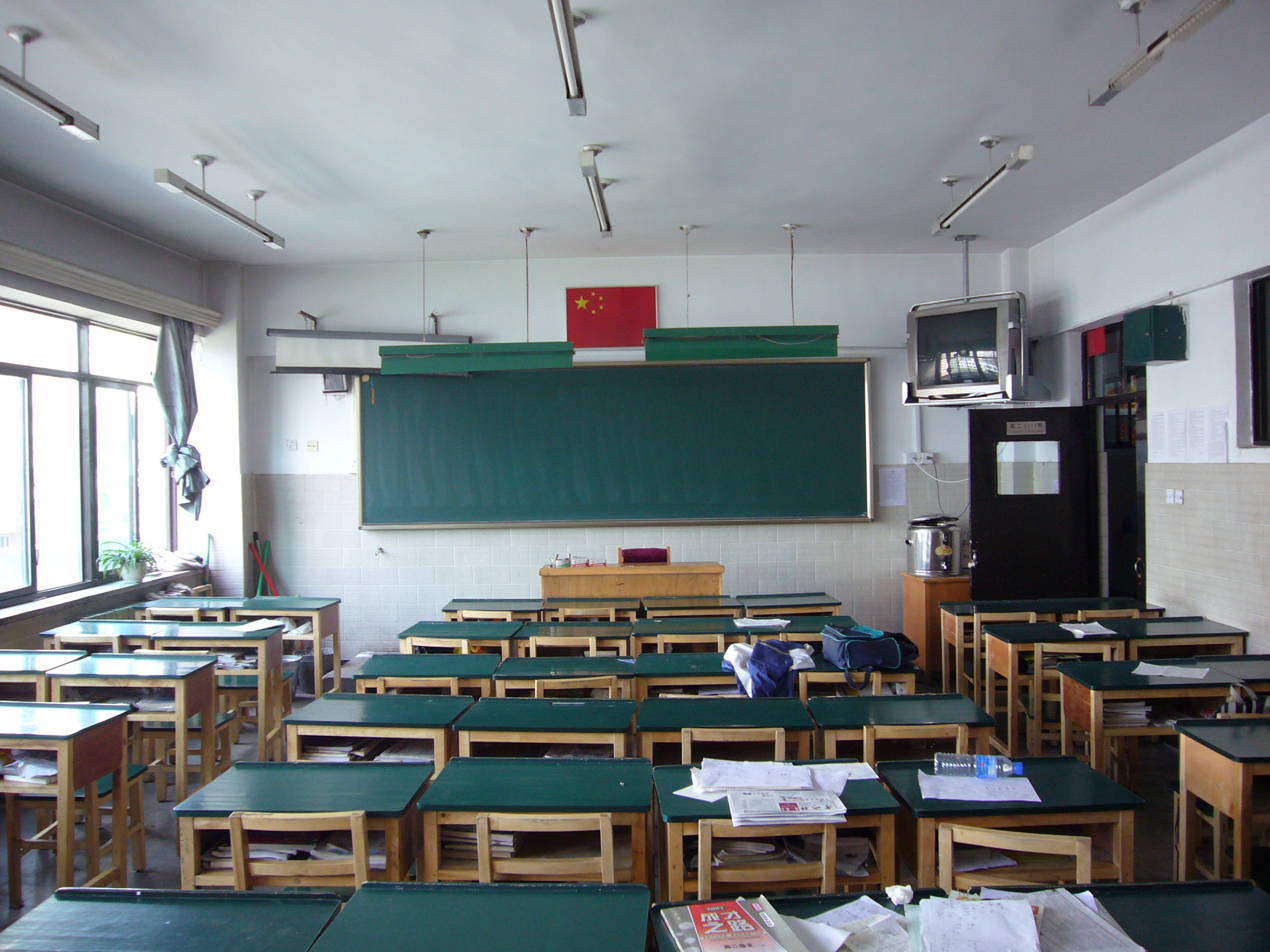
A classroom

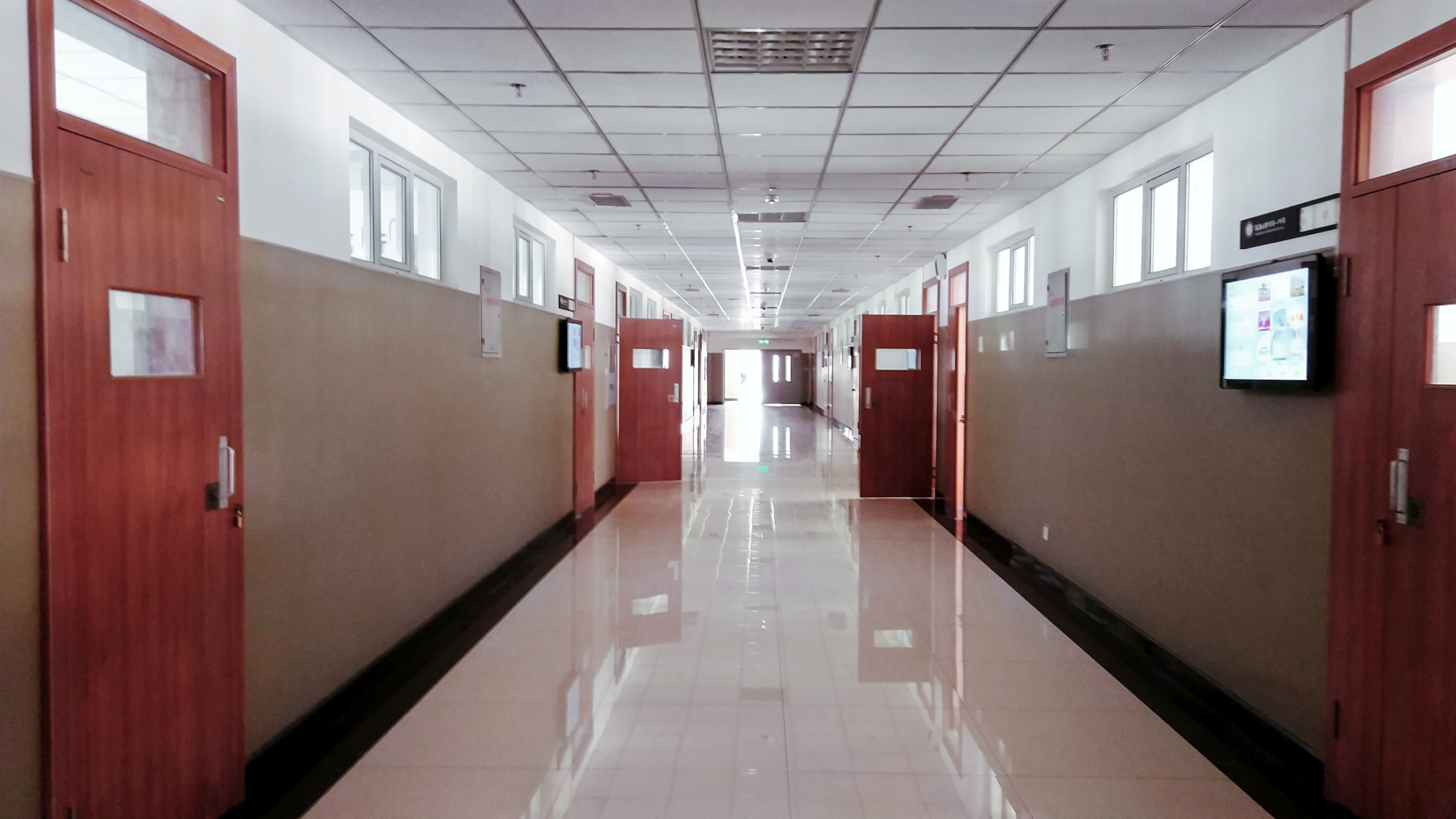
Inside the New Campus

== School leadership ==
Principal Luo Qunyan (罗群雁) Vice-Principal Yan Jingxia (闫锦霞)
Gao Yueqing (高月清) CPC General Branch Secretary Gao Ximei (高喜梅)

== Students ==
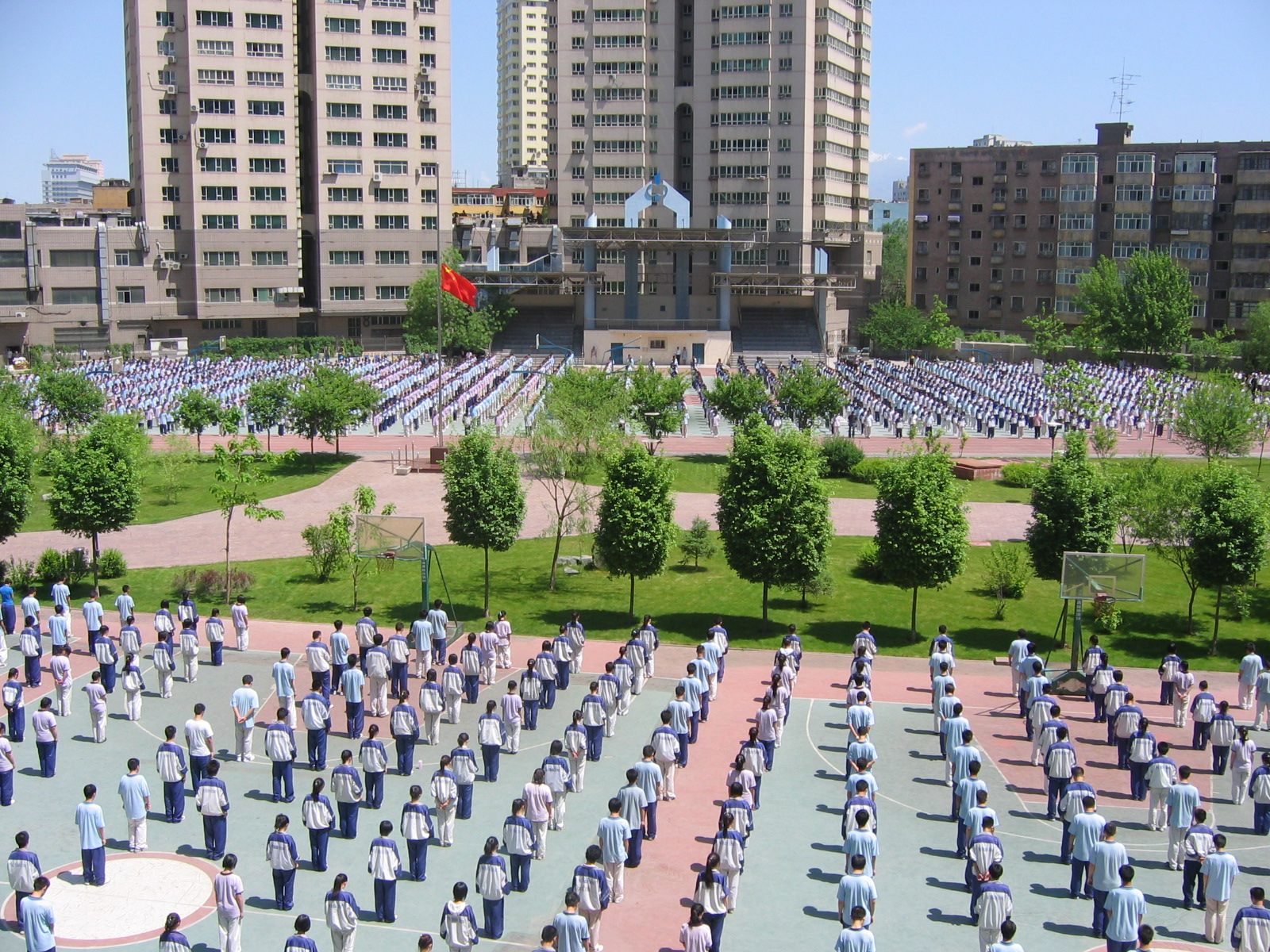
Students' silence tribute for deaths in Wenchuan earthquake, May 19, 2008

The school mainly enrolls junior middle school graduates of junior high schools in Urumqi, and a few excellent students from the other parts in the Xinjiang Uyghur Autonomous Region. The top students who passed its self-standardized difficult natural-science-oriented tests (including Chinese, mathematics, English, physics and Chemistry) will form several Natural-Scientific Strong-point Classes (理科特长班). At the end of Senior Grade 1, students who choose Social Sciences will have social-science-oriented tests (including Politics, History and Geography). The top students will form the Social-Scientific Strong-point Classes (文科特长班). Other students who are not adept at studies but have conspicuous abilities in athletics, basketball or fine arts can be also admissible if they pass the selective tests.

Statistics indicates that the school ranked 6th in 2006, and 2nd in 2008 on a nationwide ranking list by number of the number-one scholars (Chinese: 状元; pinyin: zhuàngyuán) graduates in the College Entrance Examination (CEE) every year. As of 2008, it had totally developed 10 number-one scholar graduates.

== Student organizations ==
- Astronomy group (乌鲁木齐市第一中学天文小组 ) routinely recruits students with enthusiasms about astronomy or astrophotography. It has conducted large number of astronomical observations. The group is headed by Gao Xing (高兴), a physics teacher and astronomy amateur who discovered several celestial bodies. This astronomy group is popular on the Internet, and plays an active part within the school. The current school's astronomy group, founded in 1998 (the initial one founded in the 1950s was intermitted by the Cultural Revolution), was set to typically aim for observation activities for affiliated students (it was also once disbanded in 2002, but later reestablished), and has accomplished many astronomical observation programs.

== See also ==
- Asteroid 546845 Wulumuqiyizhong, named in honor of the school
- Gao Xing
- Ürümqi
