= 324P/La Sagra =

Active asteroid

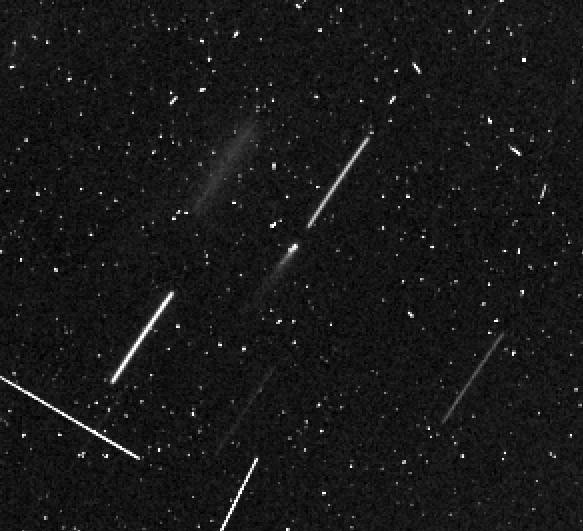
- Comet La Sagra imaged by the Hubble Space Telescope on 7 December 2015

Discovery
- Discovery site: La Sagra Observatory
- Discovery date: 14 September 2010

Designations
- MPC designation: P/2010 R2, P/2015 K3
- Alternative designations: La Sagra 4

Orbital characteristics
- Epoch: 9 June 2026 (JD 2461200.5)
- Observation arc: 16.05 years (Note: Observation arc from the Minor Planet Center database covering dates from 12 August 2010 until 30 August 2026.)
- Earliest precovery date: 12 August 2010
- Number of observations: 514
- Aphelion: 3.571 AU
- Perihelion: 2.625 AU
- Semi-major axis: 3.098 AU
- Eccentricity: 0.15381
- Orbital period: 5.453 years
- Inclination: 21.398°
- Longitude of ascending node: 270.57°
- Argument of periapsis: 57.316°
- Mean anomaly: 336.97°
- Last perihelion: 5 May 2021
- Next perihelion: 14 October 2026
- T_{Jupiter}: 3.100
- Earth MOID: 1.667 AU
- Jupiter MOID: 1.826 AU

Physical characteristics
- Mean radius: 0.55 ± 0.05 km (0.342 ± 0.031 mi)
- Geometric albedo: 0.010
- Comet total magnitude (M1): 7.9
- Comet nuclear magnitude (M2): 15.6

324P/La Sagra is an active asteroid with an orbital period of 5.44 years. It has been found to be active in more than one perihelia, indicating that the source of activity is sublimation.

== Discovery and observation ==
The asteroid was first noticed in images taken by La Sagra Observatory on 14 September 2010 with a 0.45-m f/2.8 reflector by J. Nomen, who also noticed it was diffuse. The asteroid was also found in images obtained in 13 August, but showed no cometary features. On 17 September was noticed that it has a coma with a diameter of 6 arcseconds and a tail 11 arcseconds long.

The comet was recovered on 21 March 2015 by Scott S. Sheppard at Las Campanas Observatory. The object was one magnitude brighter than expected, indicating dust production at a heliocentric distance of 2.8 AU (420 million km), and in May and June a dust tail was observed.

== Orbit ==
324P has an elliptical orbit around the Sun at an average distance of 3.09 AU (462 million km), placing it in the main asteroid belt. With an orbital eccentricity of 0.15, its distance from the Sun ranges from 2.62 AU at perihelion to 3.57 AU at aphelion. It has a high orbital inclination of 21.4° with respect to the ecliptic plane, unusual for a main-belt comet. It is associated with the Alauda family, a roughly 640 million year old asteroid family. Within the Alauda famiy is a small candidate subgroup of 39 asteroids associated with 324P.

== Physical characteristics ==
The nucleus of the comet has an effective radius of 0.55 ± 0.05 km (0.342 ± 0.031 mi). The source of activity is water ice sublimation from an area that covers about 0.2% of the surface of the nucleus. The mass loss of the comet is estimated to be 0.2 kg/s, and reached 4.0 kg/s during the 2010 perihelion.

It exhibits non-gravitational acceleration due to outgassing.

== Notes ==
Numbered comets
Previous; 323P/SOHO	324P/La Sagra	Next; 325P/Yang–Gao
