= Sebastian F. Hönig =

German astronomer

Sebastian Florian Hönig
- Born: 1978 (age 47–48)
- Education: Erich Kästner Gymnasium (Eislingen, Germany)
- Alma mater: Heidelberg University (Dr. rer. nat.); University of Bonn (Dipl.-Phys.)
- Scientific career
- Fields: Astronomy; Active galactic nucleii Physics; Comets and minor planets
- Institutions: University of Southampton; University of Copenhagen; Kiel University; University of California, Santa Barbara; Max Planck Institute for Radio Astronomy
- Thesis: Clumpy Dust Tori in Active Galactic Nuclei (2008)
- Doctoral advisor: Gerd Weigelt

Minor planets discovered: 568
see § List of discovered minor planets

Sebastian Florian Hönig (born 1978) is a German astronomer, Professor of Observational & Computational Astrophysics (and Head of School elect) in the astronomy group of the University of Southampton School of Physics & Astronomy, and discoverer of minor planets and comets.

== Career and research ==
Hönig works on the theory and observations of active galactic nuclei (AGN), dust tori and dusty winds. He received his PhD (Dr. rer. nat.) from the University of Bonn with work carried out in the Infrared Interferometry group at the Max Planck Institute for Radio Astronomy. During this time he developed a new Radiative transfer to interpret infrared observations of AGN. In 2010, Hönig received a DFG Fellowship and moved to the University of California, Santa Barbara working with Robert Antonucci. During this time, he used VLTI observations of two Seyfert galaxies to show that dusty winds contribute significantly to the infrared radiation from these objects. Hönig received a Marie Skłodowska-Curie (2014) and an ERC Starting Grant (2015) at the University of Southampton to study this phenomenon in more detail.

He is involved in the development of instruments for the Paranal Observatory of the European Southern Observatory (ESO). Hönig is Co-Investigator of GRAVITY+, an upgrade to the GRAVITY instrument. He is member of the Time Domain Extragalactic Survey (TiDES) using the 4MOST instrument at ESO's VISTA telescope and leads the AGN reverberation mapping sub-survey.

== Comets and minor planets ==
Hönig has identified numerous asteroids and correctly identified the periodic comet P/2007 R5 despite it having no tail. On 22 July 2002, he discovered comet C/2002 O4 and is credited by the MPC with the discovery of 560 numbered minor planets during 2001–2008.

On 7 January 2004, the outer main-belt asteroid 51983 Hönig, discovered by Charles Juels and Paulo R. Holvorcem in 2001, was named in his honor (M.P.C. 50465).

== List of discovered minor planets ==
| 68947 Brunofunk | 8 August 2002 | list |
| 68948 Mikeoates | 8 August 2002 | list |
| 73491 Robmatson | 8 August 2002 | list |
| 78115 Skiantonucci | 20 June 2002 | list |
| 78386 Deuzelur | 8 August 2002 | list |
| (78387) 2002 PD_{156} | 8 August 2002 | list |
| (78388) 2002 PT_{156} | 8 August 2002 | list |
| (78389) 2002 PP_{158} | 8 August 2002 | list |
| (78390) 2002 PQ_{163} | 8 August 2002 | list |
| 78391 Michaeljäger | 8 August 2002 | list |
| 78429 Baschek | 18 August 2002 | list |
| 78430 Andrewpearce | 18 August 2002 | list |
| 78433 Gertrudolf | 29 August 2002 | list |
| 84011 Jean-Claude | 23 July 2002 | list |
| (84073) 2002 PY_{158} | 8 August 2002 | list |
| (84074) 2002 PN_{163} | 8 August 2002 | list |
| 99861 Tscharnuter | 29 July 2002 | list |
| 99862 Kenlevin | 23 July 2002 | list |
| (99885) 2002 PR_{157} | 8 August 2002 | list |
| (99886) 2002 PV_{158} | 8 August 2002 | list |
| (99887) 2002 PC_{159} | 8 August 2002 | list |
| (99888) 2002 PK_{164} | 8 August 2002 | list |
| (99889) 2002 PS_{164} | 8 August 2002 | list |
| (99890) 2002 PZ_{164} | 8 August 2002 | list |
| (99902) 2002 QZ_{47} | 18 August 2002 | list |

| (99903) 2002 QG_{48} | 17 August 2002 | list |
| (99904) 2002 QH_{48} | 27 August 2002 | list |
| (112433) 2002 NC_{57} | 14 July 2002 | list |
| (112479) 2002 OE_{25} | 29 July 2002 | list |
| (112480) 2002 OF_{25} | 29 July 2002 | list |
| (112765) 2002 PR_{155} | 8 August 2002 | list |
| (112766) 2002 PJ_{156} | 8 August 2002 | list |
| (112767) 2002 PO_{156} | 8 August 2002 | list |
| (112768) 2002 PS_{156} | 8 August 2002 | list |
| (112769) 2002 PU_{156} | 8 August 2002 | list |
| (112770) 2002 PK_{157} | 8 August 2002 | list |
| (112771) 2002 PU_{157} | 8 August 2002 | list |
| (112772) 2002 PZ_{157} | 8 August 2002 | list |
| (112773) 2002 PD_{158} | 8 August 2002 | list |
| (112774) 2002 PQ_{158} | 8 August 2002 | list |
| (112775) 2002 PR_{158} | 8 August 2002 | list |
| (112776) 2002 PA_{159} | 8 August 2002 | list |
| (112777) 2002 PD_{159} | 8 August 2002 | list |
| (112778) 2002 PJ_{159} | 8 August 2002 | list |
| (112779) 2002 PK_{160} | 8 August 2002 | list |
| (112780) 2002 PO_{160} | 8 August 2002 | list |
| (112781) 2002 PR_{160} | 8 August 2002 | list |
| (112782) 2002 PU_{160} | 8 August 2002 | list |
| (112783) 2002 PC_{161} | 8 August 2002 | list |
| (112784) 2002 PD_{161} | 8 August 2002 | list |

| (112785) 2002 PK_{161} | 8 August 2002 | list |
| (112786) 2002 PM_{161} | 8 August 2002 | list |
| (112787) 2002 PH_{162} | 8 August 2002 | list |
| (112788) 2002 PC_{163} | 8 August 2002 | list |
| (112789) 2002 PR_{163} | 8 August 2002 | list |
| (112790) 2002 PC_{164} | 8 August 2002 | list |
| (112791) 2002 PE_{164} | 8 August 2002 | list |
| (112792) 2002 PF_{164} | 8 August 2002 | list |
| (112793) 2002 PH_{164} | 8 August 2002 | list |
| (112794) 2002 PV_{164} | 8 August 2002 | list |
| (112795) 2002 PC_{165} | 8 August 2002 | list |
| (112796) 2002 PE_{165} | 8 August 2002 | list |
| (112893) 2002 QF_{48} | 17 August 2002 | list |
| (112894) 2002 QM_{48} | 29 August 2002 | list |
| (112895) 2002 QQ_{48} | 18 August 2002 | list |
| (112896) 2002 QS_{48} | 18 August 2002 | list |
| (112902) 2002 QO_{52} | 29 August 2002 | list |
| (112903) 2002 QB_{53} | 29 August 2002 | list |
| (112904) 2002 QS_{53} | 29 August 2002 | list |
| (112905) 2002 QD_{54} | 29 August 2002 | list |
| (112906) 2002 QP_{54} | 29 August 2002 | list |
| (112908) 2002 QX_{54} | 29 August 2002 | list |
| (112909) 2002 QL_{56} | 29 August 2002 | list |
| (112910) 2002 QY_{56} | 29 August 2002 | list |
| (112912) 2002 QF_{58} | 29 August 2002 | list |

| (112913) 2002 QP_{58} | 18 August 2002 | list |
| (127452) 2002 PN_{156} | 8 August 2002 | list |
| (127453) 2002 PK_{163} | 8 August 2002 | list |
| (127547) 2002 XG_{94} | 3 December 2002 | list |
| (132662) 2002 LQ_{60} | 8 June 2002 | list |
| (132717) 2002 OT_{24} | 22 July 2002 | list |
| (132793) 2002 PJ_{155} | 8 August 2002 | list |
| (132794) 2002 PS_{155} | 8 August 2002 | list |
| (132795) 2002 PU_{161} | 8 August 2002 | list |
| (132796) 2002 PR_{162} | 8 August 2002 | list |
| (132816) 2002 QL_{49} | 29 August 2002 | list |
| (135740) 2002 PF_{158} | 8 August 2002 | list |
| (141996) 2002 PG_{156} | 8 August 2002 | list |
| (141997) 2002 PK_{156} | 8 August 2002 | list |
| (141998) 2002 PE_{157} | 8 August 2002 | list |
| (141999) 2002 PJ_{157} | 8 August 2002 | list |
| (142000) 2002 PZ_{158} | 8 August 2002 | list |
| (142001) 2002 PW_{159} | 8 August 2002 | list |
| (142002) 2002 PM_{160} | 8 August 2002 | list |
| (142003) 2002 PP_{160} | 8 August 2002 | list |
| (142004) 2002 PE_{161} | 8 August 2002 | list |
| (142005) 2002 PS_{161} | 8 August 2002 | list |
| (142006) 2002 PG_{162} | 8 August 2002 | list |
| (142007) 2002 PJ_{162} | 8 August 2002 | list |
| (142008) 2002 PT_{162} | 8 August 2002 | list |

| (142009) 2002 PS_{163} | 8 August 2002 | list |
| (142010) 2002 PX_{163} | 8 August 2002 | list |
| (142012) 2002 PF_{165} | 8 August 2002 | list |
| (142085) 2002 QB_{48} | 29 August 2002 | list |
| (142089) 2002 QE_{52} | 29 August 2002 | list |
| (142090) 2002 QL_{52} | 29 August 2002 | list |
| 142091 Omerblaes | 29 August 2002 | list |
| (142092) 2002 QT_{53} | 29 August 2002 | list |
| (142093) 2002 QM_{54} | 29 August 2002 | list |
| (142094) 2002 QR_{55} | 29 August 2002 | list |
| (142370) 2002 RZ_{239} | 15 September 2002 | list |
| (143074) 2002 WK_{19} | 25 November 2002 | list |
| 145558 Raiatea | 17 July 2006 | list |
| (149208) 2002 PP_{159} | 8 August 2002 | list |
| (149209) 2002 PH_{160} | 8 August 2002 | list |
| (149378) 2002 XF_{94} | 3 December 2002 | list |
| (150049) 2006 OE_{1} | 19 July 2006 | list |
| (150051) 2006 QM_{10} | 21 August 2006 | list |
| (150052) 2006 QO_{10} | 21 August 2006 | list |
| (150056) 2006 QN_{137} | 30 August 2006 | list |
| (151630) 2002 WO_{19} | 24 November 2002 | list |
| (151653) 2002 XB_{94} | 3 December 2002 | list |
| (159700) 2002 PS_{160} | 8 August 2002 | list |
| (160245) 2002 NZ_{56} | 14 July 2002 | list |
| 160259 Mareike | 29 August 2002 | list |

| (160505) 2007 JN_{16} | 11 May 2007 | list^{[A]} |
| (161110) 2002 QA_{54} | 29 August 2002 | list |
| (161111) 2002 QS_{56} | 29 August 2002 | list |
| (161112) 2002 QX_{57} | 29 August 2002 | list |
| (163386) 2002 PP_{156} | 11 August 2002 | list |
| (163398) 2002 QQ_{55} | 29 August 2002 | list |
| (163665) 2002 VN_{131} | 13 November 2002 | list |
| (166419) 2002 OA_{25} | 29 July 2002 | list |
| (166487) 2002 PG_{157} | 8 August 2002 | list |
| (166488) 2002 PO_{158} | 8 August 2002 | list |
| (166489) 2002 PS_{158} | 8 August 2002 | list |
| (166490) 2002 PH_{159} | 8 August 2002 | list |
| (166491) 2002 PQ_{161} | 8 August 2002 | list |
| (166492) 2002 PX_{162} | 8 August 2002 | list |
| (166514) 2002 QZ_{56} | 29 August 2002 | list |
| (166611) 2002 RT_{239} | 1 September 2002 | list |
| (168252) 2006 LA_{1} | 2 June 2006 | list^{[A]} |
| (169747) 2002 OY_{24} | 23 July 2002 | list |
| (169789) 2002 PZ_{156} | 8 August 2002 | list |
| (169790) 2002 PD_{157} | 8 August 2002 | list |
| (169791) 2002 PB_{158} | 8 August 2002 | list |
| (169792) 2002 PP_{161} | 8 August 2002 | list |
| (169793) 2002 PU_{164} | 8 August 2002 | list |
| (169816) 2002 QK_{55} | 29 August 2002 | list |
| (169817) 2002 QS_{55} | 29 August 2002 | list |

| (169818) 2002 QC_{56} | 29 August 2002 | list |
| (169819) 2002 QE_{57} | 29 August 2002 | list |
| (169821) 2002 QT_{57} | 29 August 2002 | list |
| (171379) 2006 OL_{9} | 24 July 2006 | list |
| (172192) 2002 PB_{156} | 8 August 2002 | list |
| (172193) 2002 PA_{160} | 8 August 2002 | list |
| (172194) 2002 PD_{162} | 8 August 2002 | list |
| (172204) 2002 QR_{52} | 29 August 2002 | list |
| (172205) 2002 QT_{52} | 29 August 2002 | list |
| (172206) 2002 QQ_{54} | 29 August 2002 | list |
| (174185) 2002 PP_{155} | 8 August 2002 | list |
| (174186) 2002 PY_{157} | 8 August 2002 | list |
| (174201) 2002 QO_{48} | 18 August 2002 | list |
| (174202) 2002 QQ_{49} | 18 August 2002 | list |
| (174266) 2002 RW_{239} | 4 September 2002 | list |
| (174427) 2002 WL_{19} | 25 November 2002 | list |
| (176691) 2002 PQ_{160} | 8 August 2002 | list |
| (176707) 2002 QZ_{51} | 18 August 2002 | list |
| (176708) 2002 QY_{53} | 29 August 2002 | list |
| (176709) 2002 QJ_{56} | 29 August 2002 | list |
| (176942) 2002 WZ_{19} | 24 November 2002 | list |
| (177971) 2006 QC | 17 August 2006 | list |
| (179648) 2002 PE_{156} | 8 August 2002 | list |
| (179649) 2002 PA_{157} | 8 August 2002 | list |
| (179650) 2002 PB_{165} | 8 August 2002 | list |

| (179761) 2002 RK_{240} | 1 September 2002 | list |
| (179957) 2002 WF_{20} | 25 November 2002 | list |
| (179958) 2002 WJ_{20} | 23 November 2002 | list |
| (183031) 2002 PD_{165} | 8 August 2002 | list |
| (183042) 2002 QH_{52} | 29 August 2002 | list |
| (183358) 2002 VM_{131} | 13 November 2002 | list |
| (183365) 2002 WK_{20} | 24 November 2002 | list |
| (186412) 2002 PE_{160} | 8 August 2002 | list |
| (188190) 2002 PV_{159} | 8 August 2002 | list |
| (188193) 2002 QV_{51} | 29 August 2002 | list |
| (192204) 2007 JN_{21} | 12 May 2007 | list^{[A]} |
| (195678) 2002 OX_{24} | 23 July 2002 | list |
| (195778) 2002 PC_{156} | 8 August 2002 | list |
| (195779) 2002 PM_{157} | 8 August 2002 | list |
| (195780) 2002 PN_{160} | 8 August 2002 | list |
| (195781) 2002 PL_{162} | 8 August 2002 | list |
| (195782) 2002 PS_{162} | 8 August 2002 | list |
| (195783) 2002 PO_{163} | 8 August 2002 | list |
| (195784) 2002 PZ_{163} | 8 August 2002 | list |
| (195785) 2002 PA_{164} | 8 August 2002 | list |
| (195827) 2002 QE_{48} | 27 August 2002 | list |
| (195828) 2002 QZ_{53} | 29 August 2002 | list |
| (195829) 2002 QH_{55} | 29 August 2002 | list |
| (195997) 2002 RS_{234} | 4 September 2002 | list |
| (196002) 2002 RU_{239} | 1 September 2002 | list |

| (196004) 2002 RN_{241} | 15 September 2002 | list |
| (199959) 2007 HJ_{44} | 23 April 2007 | list^{[A]} |
| (199987) 2007 JL_{21} | 12 May 2007 | list^{[A]} |
| (199988) 2007 JM_{21} | 12 May 2007 | list^{[A]} |
| (201205) 2002 PO_{155} | 8 August 2002 | list |
| (201218) 2002 QW_{56} | 29 August 2002 | list |
| (203712) 2002 PF_{159} | 8 August 2002 | list |
| (203713) 2002 PJ_{163} | 8 August 2002 | list |
| (203714) 2002 PP_{163} | 8 August 2002 | list |
| (203715) 2002 PY_{163} | 8 August 2002 | list |
| (203716) 2002 PA_{165} | 8 August 2002 | list |
| (203728) 2002 QM_{53} | 29 August 2002 | list |
| (203729) 2002 QR_{53} | 29 August 2002 | list |
| (203730) 2002 QV_{55} | 29 August 2002 | list |
| (204790) 2006 QN_{10} | 21 August 2006 | list |
| (204813) 2007 MM_{6} | 21 June 2007 | list^{[A]} |
| (204818) 2007 OE_{4} | 22 July 2007 | list^{[A]} |
| (204837) 2007 QM_{2} | 21 August 2007 | list^{[A]} |
| (205993) 2002 OZ_{24} | 23 July 2002 | list |
| (206017) 2002 PY_{156} | 8 August 2002 | list |
| (206018) 2002 PF_{162} | 8 August 2002 | list |
| (206019) 2002 PM_{162} | 8 August 2002 | list |
| (206239) 2002 WR_{19} | 25 November 2002 | list |
| (207567) 2006 PN_{4} | 14 August 2006 | list |
| (208776) 2002 PL_{156} | 8 August 2002 | list |

| (210038) 2006 OO_{9} | 24 July 2006 | list |
| (210202) 2007 PC_{29} | 15 August 2007 | list^{[A]} |
| (211233) 2002 PW_{155} | 8 August 2002 | list |
| (212425) 2006 MQ_{13} | 20 June 2006 | list |
| (212426) 2006 OB | 16 July 2006 | list^{[A]} |
| (213611) 2002 PX_{156} | 8 August 2002 | list |
| (213621) 2002 QH_{49} | 19 August 2002 | list |
| (213622) 2002 QZ_{54} | 29 August 2002 | list |
| (213625) 2002 QH_{56} | 29 August 2002 | list |
| (214535) 2006 MR_{3} | 19 June 2006 | list |
| (216294) 2007 KM_{4} | 24 May 2007 | list^{[A]} |
| (216599) 2002 PC_{158} | 8 August 2002 | list |
| (217167) 2002 PH_{155} | 8 August 2002 | list |
| (217494) 2006 RK_{2} | 14 September 2006 | list |
| (217561) 2007 OQ_{2} | 20 July 2007 | list^{[A]} |
| (220015) 2002 PU_{155} | 8 August 2002 | list |
| (221910) 2008 QT_{23} | 31 August 2008 | list^{[A]} |
| (222957) 2002 PR_{159} | 8 August 2002 | list |
| (222966) 2002 QY_{54} | 29 August 2002 | list |
| (223141) 2002 VL_{131} | 1 November 2002 | list |
| (225071) 2007 HE_{70} | 25 April 2007 | list^{[A]} |
| (225080) 2007 JA_{23} | 13 May 2007 | list^{[A]} |
| (226089) 2002 NA_{57} | 14 July 2002 | list |
| (226115) 2002 PF_{157} | 8 August 2002 | list |
| (226233) 2002 WG_{20} | 25 November 2002 | list |

| (228701) 2002 QR_{57} | 29 August 2002 | list |
| (229750) 2007 JC_{23} | 13 May 2007 | list^{[A]} |
| (229752) 2007 JL_{36} | 14 May 2007 | list^{[A]} |
| (229759) 2007 NZ_{2} | 14 July 2007 | list^{[A]} |
| (230436) 2002 PF_{156} | 8 August 2002 | list |
| (230437) 2002 PO_{159} | 8 August 2002 | list |
| (230438) 2002 PH_{161} | 8 August 2002 | list |
| (230439) 2002 PG_{163} | 8 August 2002 | list |
| (230441) 2002 QT_{51} | 29 August 2002 | list |
| (230522) 2002 WM_{19} | 24 November 2002 | list |
| (230523) 2002 WN_{19} | 24 November 2002 | list |
| (230524) 2002 WD_{20} | 25 November 2002 | list |
| (231490) 2008 QO_{7} | 25 August 2008 | list^{[A]} |
| (232260) 2002 PA_{161} | 8 August 2002 | list |
| (232261) 2002 PZ_{162} | 8 August 2002 | list |
| (232262) 2002 PD_{163} | 8 August 2002 | list |
| (232355) 2002 WC_{20} | 25 November 2002 | list |
| (233543) 2007 JJ_{21} | 12 May 2007 | list^{[A]} |
| (233558) 2007 OF_{5} | 23 July 2007 | list^{[A]} |
| (233645) 2008 OO_{10} | 28 July 2008 | list^{[A]} |
| (233647) 2008 PE_{2} | 3 August 2008 | list^{[A]} |
| (233656) 2008 QA_{20} | 30 August 2008 | list^{[A]} |
| (234777) 2002 PV_{157} | 8 August 2002 | list |
| (234778) 2002 PW_{162} | 8 August 2002 | list |
| (234794) 2002 QX_{53} | 29 August 2002 | list |

| (236669) 2006 PD_{1} | 14 August 2006 | list |
| (236753) 2007 MJ | 16 June 2007 | list^{[A]} |
| (236758) 2007 NC_{3} | 14 July 2007 | list^{[A]} |
| (237897) 2002 NJ_{57} | 4 July 2002 | list |
| (237933) 2002 QN_{55} | 29 August 2002 | list |
| (239211) 2006 QY_{23} | 22 August 2006 | list |
| (239274) 2007 KW_{1} | 18 May 2007 | list^{[A]} |
| (239275) 2007 KL_{7} | 28 May 2007 | list^{[A]} |
| (240181) 2002 QD_{55} | 29 August 2002 | list |
| (242015) 2002 PJ_{160} | 8 August 2002 | list |
| (242016) 2002 PZ_{160} | 8 August 2002 | list |
| (242025) 2002 QP_{53} | 29 August 2002 | list |
| (242913) 2006 MS_{13} | 27 June 2006 | list |
| (243079) 2007 JN_{35} | 13 May 2007 | list^{[A]} |
| (243089) 2007 QN_{2} | 21 August 2007 | list^{[A]} |
| (243090) 2007 QA_{3} | 22 August 2007 | list^{[A]} |
| (244422) 2002 QA_{50} | 18 August 2002 | list |
| (244423) 2002 QL_{55} | 29 August 2002 | list |
| (248704) 2006 MS_{14} | 30 June 2006 | list |
| (248840) 2006 TE | 1 October 2006 | list |
| (250128) 2002 PV_{155} | 8 August 2002 | list |
| (250132) 2002 QC_{52} | 29 August 2002 | list |
| (252968) 2002 PM_{155} | 8 August 2002 | list |
| (252969) 2002 PM_{158} | 8 August 2002 | list |
| (252970) 2002 PB_{159} | 8 August 2002 | list |

| (252971) 2002 PL_{163} | 8 August 2002 | list |
| (253170) 2002 WJ_{19} | 25 November 2002 | list |
| (255593) 2006 OW_{10} | 26 July 2006 | list |
| (255695) 2006 QZ_{65} | 25 August 2006 | list |
| (255792) 2006 ST_{7} | 18 September 2006 | list |
| (256551) 2007 OM_{3} | 21 July 2007 | list^{[A]} |
| (258861) 2002 PA_{156} | 8 August 2002 | list |
| (258862) 2002 PW_{160} | 8 August 2002 | list |
| (258863) 2002 PB_{163} | 8 August 2002 | list |
| (258864) 2002 PF_{163} | 8 August 2002 | list |
| (258865) 2002 PN_{164} | 8 August 2002 | list |
| (258884) 2002 QJ_{49} | 17 August 2002 | list |
| (258885) 2002 QP_{55} | 29 August 2002 | list |
| (259111) 2002 WF_{19} | 24 November 2002 | list |
| (261989) 2006 QO_{33} | 23 August 2006 | list |
| (264795) 2002 NE_{57} | 14 July 2002 | list |
| (264822) 2002 PH_{156} | 8 August 2002 | list |
| (264823) 2002 PF_{161} | 8 August 2002 | list |
| (264824) 2002 PR_{161} | 8 August 2002 | list |
| (264836) 2002 QP_{48} | 18 August 2002 | list |
| (266456) 2007 KS_{2} | 21 May 2007 | list^{[A]} |
| (266613) 2008 OQ_{10} | 31 July 2008 | list^{[A]} |
| (267546) 2002 PG_{158} | 8 August 2002 | list |
| (267547) 2002 PE_{163} | 8 August 2002 | list |
| (267564) 2002 QJ_{52} | 29 August 2002 | list |

| (267565) 2002 QM_{52} | 29 August 2002 | list |
| (267566) 2002 QD_{53} | 29 August 2002 | list |
| (267567) 2002 QA_{55} | 29 August 2002 | list |
| (269226) 2008 PO_{4} | 5 August 2008 | list^{[A]} |
| (270651) 2002 PX_{159} | 8 August 2002 | list |
| (270652) 2002 PT_{160} | 8 August 2002 | list |
| (270653) 2002 PX_{161} | 8 August 2002 | list |
| (270688) 2002 QK_{49} | 18 August 2002 | list |
| (270689) 2002 QW_{51} | 29 August 2002 | list |
| (270690) 2002 QF_{52} | 29 August 2002 | list |
| (270691) 2002 QK_{53} | 29 August 2002 | list |
| (270692) 2002 QB_{54} | 29 August 2002 | list |
| (270693) 2002 QO_{55} | 29 August 2002 | list |
| (270796) 2002 RX_{232} | 2 September 2002 | list |
| (270982) 2002 WS_{19} | 25 November 2002 | list |
| (273941) 2007 JB_{23} | 13 May 2007 | list^{[A]} |
| (273997) 2007 OT_{2} | 20 July 2007 | list^{[A]} |
| (274019) 2007 RL_{15} | 12 September 2007 | list^{[A]} |
| (274297) 2008 QN_{19} | 29 August 2008 | list^{[A]} |
| (274318) 2008 RK | 1 September 2008 | list^{[A]} |
| (274580) 2008 TU | 1 October 2008 | list^{[A]} |
| (276183) 2002 PX_{160} | 8 August 2002 | list |
| (276184) 2002 PU_{162} | 8 August 2002 | list |
| (276199) 2002 QN_{51} | 29 August 2002 | list |
| (276200) 2002 QZ_{52} | 29 August 2002 | list |

| (278362) 2007 KZ_{1} | 18 May 2007 | list^{[A]} |
| (278364) 2007 KL_{3} | 22 May 2007 | list^{[A]} |
| (278606) 2008 PU_{9} | 7 August 2008 | list^{[A]} |
| (278634) 2008 RJ | 1 September 2008 | list^{[A]} |
| (280153) 2002 PO_{161} | 8 August 2002 | list |
| (280154) 2002 PR_{164} | 8 August 2002 | list |
| (280259) 2002 XA_{94} | 3 December 2002 | list |
| (281386) 2008 PT_{9} | 7 August 2008 | list^{[A]} |
| (282790) 2006 ME_{12} | 20 June 2006 | list |
| (282794) 2006 OF_{14} | 27 July 2006 | list |
| (282918) 2007 NA_{3} | 14 July 2007 | list^{[A]} |
| (282968) 2007 SS | 18 September 2007 | list^{[A]} |
| (283671) 2002 PV_{163} | 8 August 2002 | list |
| (283677) 2002 QG_{49} | 19 August 2002 | list |
| (283678) 2002 QA_{57} | 29 August 2002 | list |
| (284483) 2007 JG_{21} | 11 May 2007 | list^{[A]} |
| (284495) 2007 OX_{1} | 19 July 2007 | list^{[A]} |
| (284510) 2007 RM_{15} | 12 September 2007 | list^{[A]} |
| (286939) 2002 PJ_{158} | 8 August 2002 | list |
| (286940) 2002 PZ_{159} | 8 August 2002 | list |
| (286941) 2002 PJ_{161} | 8 August 2002 | list |
| (286942) 2002 PZ_{161} | 8 August 2002 | list |
| (286943) 2002 PN_{162} | 8 August 2002 | list |
| (286944) 2002 PD_{164} | 8 August 2002 | list |
| (286945) 2002 PO_{165} | 8 August 2002 | list |

| (286987) 2002 QC_{48} | 18 August 2002 | list |
| (286989) 2002 QS_{51} | 29 August 2002 | list |
| (286990) 2002 QP_{52} | 29 August 2002 | list |
| (286991) 2002 QU_{53} | 29 August 2002 | list |
| (286994) 2002 QN_{54} | 29 August 2002 | list |
| (286995) 2002 QV_{54} | 29 August 2002 | list |
| (286996) 2002 QT_{56} | 29 August 2002 | list |
| (287161) 2002 RE_{240} | 11 September 2002 | list |
| (287162) 2002 RL_{240} | 11 September 2002 | list |
| (287420) 2002 WE_{20} | 25 November 2002 | list |
| (291844) 2006 ME_{13} | 24 June 2006 | list |
| (291853) 2006 OM_{9} | 24 July 2006 | list |
| (291940) 2006 QN_{33} | 23 August 2006 | list |
| (293589) 2007 JM_{16} | 11 May 2007 | list^{[A]} |
| (293607) 2007 KT_{2} | 21 May 2007 | list^{[A]} |
| (293621) 2007 MA | 16 June 2007 | list^{[A]} |
| (293622) 2007 MB | 16 June 2007 | list^{[A]} |
| (293631) 2007 NP_{5} | 15 July 2007 | list^{[A]} |
| (293632) 2007 OR_{2} | 20 July 2007 | list^{[A]} |
| (293678) 2007 PH_{27} | 10 August 2007 | list^{[A]} |
| (295469) 2008 QU_{7} | 26 August 2008 | list^{[A]} |
| (295652) 2008 TT | 1 October 2008 | list^{[A]} |
| (297993) 2002 ND_{57} | 14 July 2002 | list |
| (298034) 2002 PR_{156} | 8 August 2002 | list |
| (298035) 2002 PN_{161} | 8 August 2002 | list |

| (298036) 2002 PO_{162} | 8 August 2002 | list |
| (298037) 2002 PW_{163} | 8 August 2002 | list |
| (298038) 2002 PQ_{164} | 8 August 2002 | list |
| (298055) 2002 QM_{51} | 29 August 2002 | list |
| (298056) 2002 QC_{54} | 29 August 2002 | list |
| (298281) 2002 XD_{94} | 3 December 2002 | list |
| (300259) 2007 HJ_{16} | 23 April 2007 | list^{[A]} |
| (300284) 2007 NX_{2} | 14 July 2007 | list^{[A]} |
| (300324) 2007 QZ_{2} | 21 August 2007 | list^{[A]} |
| (302581) 2002 PK_{155} | 8 August 2002 | list |
| (302595) 2002 QC_{53} | 29 August 2002 | list |
| (302650) 2002 RX_{239} | 4 September 2002 | list |
| (302746) 2002 UW_{41} | 30 October 2002 | list |
| (304152) 2006 NH | 3 July 2006 | list |
| (304190) 2006 QY_{65} | 25 August 2006 | list |
| (304790) 2007 NE_{5} | 15 July 2007 | list^{[A]} |
| (304796) 2007 PS_{6} | 9 August 2007 | list^{[A]} |
| (304800) 2007 PH_{12} | 10 August 2007 | list^{[A]} |
| (307303) 2002 QO_{54} | 29 August 2002 | list |
| (308765) 2006 OD_{1} | 19 July 2006 | list |
| (308768) 2006 ON_{9} | 24 July 2006 | list |
| (310740) 2002 QN_{53} | 29 August 2002 | list |
| (310741) 2002 QQ_{53} | 29 August 2002 | list |
| (313409) 2002 PN_{155} | 8 August 2002 | list |
| (313410) 2002 PL_{159} | 8 August 2002 | list |

| (313422) 2002 QK_{48} | 29 August 2002 | list |
| (313424) 2002 QO_{53} | 29 August 2002 | list |
| (313425) 2002 QT_{54} | 29 August 2002 | list |
| (314708) 2006 SS_{6} | 17 September 2006 | list |
| (315192) 2007 PG_{27} | 10 August 2007 | list^{[A]} |
| (317408) 2002 PW_{158} | 8 August 2002 | list |
| (317409) 2002 PM_{159} | 8 August 2002 | list |
| (317480) 2002 RV_{239} | 1 September 2002 | list |
| (317583) 2002 WW_{19} | 24 November 2002 | list |
| (319460) 2006 NJ | 3 July 2006 | list |
| (320216) 2007 HK_{44} | 23 April 2007 | list^{[A]} |
| (320245) 2007 KH_{3} | 22 May 2007 | list^{[A]} |
| (321032) 2008 PL_{4} | 5 August 2008 | list^{[A]} |
| (323012) 2002 PQ_{155} | 8 August 2002 | list |
| (323013) 2002 PT_{161} | 8 August 2002 | list |
| (326557) 2002 PM_{156} | 8 August 2002 | list |
| (328027) 2007 KU_{2} | 21 May 2007 | list^{[A]} |
| (328367) 2008 QR_{7} | 25 August 2008 | list^{[A]} |
| (328369) 2008 QJ_{16} | 28 August 2008 | list^{[A]} |
| (329471) 2002 QL_{48} | 18 August 2002 | list |
| (330498) 2007 KY_{1} | 18 May 2007 | list^{[A]} |
| (331667) 2002 PP_{162} | 8 August 2002 | list |
| (332546) 2008 QH_{16} | 28 August 2008 | list^{[A]} |
| (334470) 2002 PM_{163} | 8 August 2002 | list |
| (334489) 2002 QY_{51} | 29 August 2002 | list |

| (335843) 2007 MN_{6} | 21 June 2007 | list^{[A]} |
| (336128) 2008 PU_{4} | 5 August 2008 | list^{[A]} |
| (336153) 2008 RH | 1 September 2008 | list^{[A]} |
| (338060) 2002 OS_{24} | 29 July 2002 | list |
| (338111) 2002 QD_{48} | 27 August 2002 | list |
| (338113) 2002 QJ_{55} | 29 August 2002 | list |
| (338114) 2002 QG_{56} | 29 August 2002 | list |
| (338342) 2002 WV_{19} | 24 November 2002 | list |
| (338343) 2002 WY_{19} | 24 November 2002 | list |
| (340575) 2006 MO_{14} | 29 June 2006 | list |
| (341125) 2007 MC | 16 June 2007 | list^{[A]} |
| (341126) 2007 ME | 16 June 2007 | list^{[A]} |
| (341141) 2007 PR_{6} | 9 August 2007 | list^{[A]} |
| (341933) 2008 OZ_{2} | 28 July 2008 | list^{[A]} |
| (341936) 2008 OD_{9} | 28 July 2008 | list^{[A]} |
| (341944) 2008 PC | 1 August 2008 | list^{[A]} |
| (341945) 2008 PE | 1 August 2008 | list^{[A]} |
| (343756) 2011 FF_{60} | 22 May 2007 | list^{[A]} |
| (343916) 2011 JE_{29} | 22 May 2007 | list^{[A]} |
| (344477) 2002 PB_{160} | 8 August 2002 | list |
| (344487) 2002 QR_{48} | 18 August 2002 | list |
| (344554) 2002 WG_{19} | 25 November 2002 | list |
| (345834) 2007 KK_{3} | 22 May 2007 | list^{[A]} |
| (345838) 2007 LL_{18} | 13 June 2007 | list^{[A]} |
| (345847) 2007 OW_{1} | 19 July 2007 | list^{[A]} |

| (345852) 2007 PT_{6} | 9 August 2007 | list^{[A]} |
| (346290) 2008 OF_{10} | 28 July 2008 | list^{[A]} |
| (346324) 2008 RF | 1 September 2008 | list^{[A]} |
| (346325) 2008 RN_{1} | 3 September 2008 | list^{[A]} |
| (347821) 2002 OM_{25} | 30 July 2002 | list |
| (349152) 2007 OM_{2} | 19 July 2007 | list^{[A]} |
| (349153) 2007 OS_{2} | 20 July 2007 | list^{[A]} |
| (349159) 2007 PA_{28} | 14 August 2007 | list^{[A]} |
| (349160) 2007 PB_{29} | 15 August 2007 | list^{[A]} |
| (349513) 2008 RS | 2 September 2008 | list^{[A]} |
| (350880) 2002 QK_{56} | 29 August 2002 | list |
| (350882) 2002 QS_{57} | 29 August 2002 | list |
| (352147) 2007 OD_{5} | 23 July 2007 | list^{[A]} |
| (354279) 2002 RD_{241} | 17 August 2002 | list |
| (355759) 2008 RE | 1 September 2008 | list^{[A]} |
| (357242) 2002 OG_{25} | 29 July 2002 | list |
| (357259) 2002 QX_{51} | 18 August 2002 | list |
| (360449) 2002 OR_{24} | 29 July 2002 | list |
| (360454) 2002 QM_{55} | 29 August 2002 | list |
| (363332) 2002 PN_{157} | 8 August 2002 | list |
| (363333) 2002 PQ_{157} | 8 August 2002 | list |
| (363345) 2002 QE_{56} | 29 August 2002 | list |
| (366509) 2002 PC_{157} | 8 August 2002 | list |
| (366510) 2002 PW_{157} | 8 August 2002 | list |
| (366531) 2002 QA_{48} | 27 August 2002 | list |

| (366532) 2002 QY_{55} | 29 August 2002 | list |
| (368321) 2002 PA_{163} | 8 August 2002 | list |
| (370239) 2002 PT_{155} | 8 August 2002 | list |
| (370240) 2002 PP_{157} | 8 August 2002 | list |
| (370241) 2002 PU_{163} | 8 August 2002 | list |
| (370242) 2002 PY_{164} | 8 August 2002 | list |
| (370268) 2002 QA_{52} | 18 August 2002 | list |
| (370269) 2002 QL_{54} | 29 August 2002 | list |
| (370270) 2002 QU_{57} | 29 August 2002 | list |
| (370271) 2002 QO_{58} | 18 August 2002 | list |
| (371777) 2007 HL_{44} | 24 April 2007 | list^{[A]} |
| (371790) 2007 ON_{3} | 21 July 2007 | list^{[A]} |
| (371793) 2007 PG_{12} | 10 August 2007 | list^{[A]} |
| (373656) 2002 QV_{56} | 29 August 2002 | list |
| (374676) 2006 QD | 17 August 2006 | list |
| (377001) 2002 QU_{54} | 29 August 2002 | list |
| (377101) 2002 WP_{19} | 24 November 2002 | list |
| (378356) 2007 KL_{2} | 19 May 2007 | list^{[A]} |
| (378458) 2007 ST | 18 September 2007 | list^{[A]} |
| (381488) 2008 SO_{82} | 25 September 2008 | list^{[A]} |
| (382707) 2002 WD_{19} | 24 November 2002 | list |
| (383623) 2007 PF_{12} | 10 August 2007 | list^{[A]} |
| (388556) 2007 OD_{2} | 19 July 2007 | list^{[A]} |
| (388863) 2008 PV_{9} | 7 August 2008 | list^{[A]} |
| (391492) 2007 MS_{20} | 24 June 2007 | list^{[A]} |

| (391778) 2008 PF_{7} | 6 August 2008 | list^{[A]} |
| (396668) 2002 PZ_{155} | 8 August 2002 | list |
| (397798) 2008 PD | 1 August 2008 | list^{[A]} |
| (397846) 2008 TS | 1 October 2008 | list^{[A]} |
| (399517) 2002 VO_{131} | 1 November 2002 | list |
| (400017) 2006 OX_{10} | 26 July 2006 | list |
| (400018) 2006 OG_{14} | 27 July 2006 | list |
| (413166) 2002 PY_{161} | 8 August 2002 | list |
| (416107) 2002 PA_{162} | 8 August 2002 | list |
| (416108) 2002 PY_{162} | 8 August 2002 | list |
| (422868) 2002 PC_{160} | 8 August 2002 | list |
| (422869) 2002 PW_{161} | 8 August 2002 | list |
| (422881) 2002 QX_{52} | 29 August 2002 | list |
| (428087) 2006 OP_{9} | 24 July 2006 | list |
| (430566) 2002 PK_{162} | 8 August 2002 | list |
| (430572) 2002 QV_{52} | 29 August 2002 | list |
| (430573) 2002 QU_{55} | 29 August 2002 | list |
| (430611) 2002 WT_{19} | 24 November 2002 | list |
| (431788) 2008 PH_{4} | 5 August 2008 | list^{[A]} |
| (434124) 2002 QD_{52} | 29 August 2002 | list |
| (434125) 2002 QA_{53} | 29 August 2002 | list |
| (434127) 2002 QF_{57} | 29 August 2002 | list |
| (435547) 2008 PX_{4} | 5 August 2008 | list^{[A]} |
| (437931) 2002 PX_{155} | 8 August 2002 | list |
| (437932) 2002 PG_{160} | 8 August 2002 | list |

| (440039) 2002 PL_{158} | 8 August 2002 | list |
| (440044) 2002 QM_{56} | 29 August 2002 | list |
| (443916) 2002 PO_{157} | 8 August 2002 | list |
| (452398) 2002 PS_{157} | 8 August 2002 | list |
| (452811) 2006 PO_{4} | 15 August 2006 | list |
| (453005) 2007 JO_{35} | 14 May 2007 | list^{[A]} |
| (455221) 2001 QJ_{331} | 27 August 2001 | list |
| (455325) 2002 OH_{25} | 29 July 2002 | list |
| (461463) 2002 QS_{52} | 29 August 2002 | list |
| (469454) 2002 PT_{164} | 8 August 2002 | list |
| (474350) 2002 QN_{52} | 29 August 2002 | list |
| (474351) 2002 QT_{55} | 29 August 2002 | list |
| (475970) 2007 JM_{36} | 15 May 2007 | list^{[A]} |
| (496020) 2008 PP_{15} | 10 August 2008 | list^{[A]} |
| (496967) 2002 PL_{155} | 8 August 2002 | list |
| (498700) 2008 TR | 1 October 2008 | list^{[A]} |
| (516413) 2002 QK_{52} | 29 August 2002 | list |
| (544295) 2014 UP_{28} | 28 August 2008 | list^{[A]} |
| (549487) 2011 KV_{2} | 25 August 2008 | list^{[A]} |
| (555244) 2013 TM_{129} | 25 August 2008 | list^{[A]} |
| 594032 Reyhersamuel | 23 August 2004 | list^{[B]} |
| (612400) 2002 QB_{49} | 18 August 2002 | list |
| (612403) 2002 QQ_{51} | 29 August 2002 | list |
| (612404) 2002 QB_{55} | 29 August 2002 | list |
| (612405) 2002 QC_{55} | 29 August 2002 | list |

| (613998) 2008 PS_{4} | 5 August 2008 | list^{[A]} |
| (643672) 2006 NG | 3 July 2006 | list^{[A]} |
| (647073) 2008 PJ_{4} | 5 August 2008 | list^{[A]} |
| (664434) 2008 PM_{4} | 5 August 2008 | list^{[A]} |
| (664468) 2008 RG | 1 September 2008 | list^{[A]} |
| (672934) 2014 YF_{31} | 20 August 2004 | list^{[B]} |
| (678080) 2017 HD_{1} | 2 September 2008 | list^{[A]} |
| (741665) 2006 QE_{137} | 29 August 2006 | list^{[A]} |
| (743234) 2008 QP_{7} | 25 August 2008 | list^{[A]} |
| (830544) 2008 PM_{3} | 4 August 2008 | list^{[A]} |
| (876460) 2008 PP_{4} | 5 August 2008 | list^{[A]} |
Co-discovery made with:^{A} N. Teamo^{B} W. J. Duschl

== See also ==
- List of minor planet discoverers
