= C/2023 F2 (SOHO) =

Meyer sungrazer comet

Discovery
- Discovered by: SOHO; Hanjie Tan
- Discovery date: 21 March 2023

Designations
- Alternative designations: SOHO-4658

Orbital characteristics
- Epoch: 21 March 2023 (JD 2460024.5)
- Observation arc: 1 day
- Earliest precovery date: 20 March 2023
- Number of observations: 164
- Orbit type: Meyer sungrazer
- Perihelion: 0.035 AU
- Eccentricity: 1.01293
- Inclination: 64.655°
- Longitude of ascending node: 81.953°
- Argument of periapsis: 48.215°
- Last perihelion: 21 March 2023
- Earth MOID: 0.522 AU
- Jupiter MOID: 3.479 AU

Physical characteristics
- Comet total magnitude (M1): 20.8
- Apparent magnitude: 5.5 (2023 apparition)

C/2023 F2 (SOHO), also known as SOHO-4658, is a sungrazing comet that was discovered by Chinese astronomer, Hanjie Tan, from images taken by the Solar and Heliospheric Observatory on 20 March 2023.

== Observational history ==
It is a member of the Meyer family, the second largest sungrazer group of comets after the Kreutz sungrazers, and is one of the brightest of 270 known of the group so far, having reached a peak magnitude of 6.5 during perihelion. This provided a possible opportunity to view it from ground observations, however attempts to locate the comet from the La Silla Observatory in April 2023 were unsuccessful.
