= 322P/SOHO =

Kracht sungrazer comet

Discovery
- Discovered by: SOHO: Terry Lovejoy; Kazimieras Černis; Bo Zhou; Sebastian F. Hönig
- Discovery date: 4 September 1999

Designations
- MPC designation: P/1999 R1; P/2003 R5; P/2007 R5; P/2011 R4
- Alternative designations: SOHO-85; SOHO-661

Orbital characteristics
- Epoch: 15 September 2015 (JD 2457280.5)
- Observation arc: 15.93 years
- Earliest precovery date: 27 November 254?
- Number of observations: 319
- Aphelion: 4.979 AU
- Perihelion: 0.0507 AU
- Semi-major axis: 2.516 AU
- Eccentricity: 0.97869
- Orbital period: 3.992 years
- Max. orbital speed: 186 km/s (2027)
- Min. orbital speed: 1.9 km/s (2017)
- Inclination: 12.583°
- Longitude of ascending node: 359.48°
- Argument of periapsis: 49.098°
- Mean anomaly: 2.700°
- Last perihelion: 21 August 2023
- Next perihelion: 11 August 2027
- T_{Jupiter}: 2.347
- Earth MOID: 0.092 AU
- Jupiter MOID: 1.044 AU

Physical characteristics
- Dimensions: ~150–320 m (490–1,050 ft)
- Mean density: ~1.00 g/cm^{3}
- Synodic rotation period: 2.8±0.3 hours
- Geometric albedo: 0.09–0.42
- Spectral type: (V–R) = 0.41±0.04 (R–I) = 0.24±0.09
- Comet total magnitude (M1): 19.0

322P/SOHO is the first periodic comet to be discovered using the automated telescopes of the Solar and Heliospheric Observatory (SOHO) spacecraft, and second to be given a numbered designation, after 321P/SOHO. At perihelion, it is six times closer to the Sun than the planet Mercury.

== Observational history ==
The comet was first spotted by Terry Lovejoy after analyzing SOHO imagery on 4 September 1999.

After Kazimieras Černis spotted another SOHO comet in 2003, Sebastian F. Hönig, later determined that both P/1999 R1 and P/2003 R5 might be the same object, where he predicted its return in 2007. His calculations were later proven correct when it was successfully recovered by Bo Zhou as P/2007 R5 after analyzing SOHO images on 10 September 2007. It became one of the first comets that SOHO has discovered that is confirmed to be periodic.

Bo Zhou recovered the comet once again on 6 September 2011. It was observed again in September 2019.

=== Possible connection with the Great Comet of 254 AD ===
It has been suggested that 322P/SOHO is associated with a comet observed in November–December 254 AD and is mentioned in East Asian sources to have an extremely long tail. If the association is correct, it is possible that the comet split in 254 AD, resulting in intense cometary activity, but activity decreased afterwards as the comet lost most of its volatiles, and no longer displays a tail or a prominent coma. Current activity is fueled by sodium sublimation.

== Physical characteristics ==
322P/SOHO is either an extinct comet or an active asteroid. Light-curve and infrared observations by Spitzer in 2016 suggest that its nucleus is probably only 150–320 m (490–1,050 ft) in diameter, with a rotation period lasting 2.8±0.3 hours.

== Orbit ==
Perihelion distance at different epochs
Perihelion date	Perihelion (AU)
1955-04-18	0.0651
1983-08-08	0.0597
1999-09-05	0.0563
2015-09-04	0.0535
2019-08-31	0.0506
2023-08-21	0.0501
2027-08-11	0.0505
2031-08-01	0.0479
2047-05-23	0.0451

322P/SOHO is a member of the Kracht sungrazer family of comets. On 11 April 1947, it passed about 7.1 ± 0.22 million km (4.4 ± 0.14 million mi) from Earth.

== Exploration ==
On 2 September 2019, NASA's Parker Solar Probe incidentally passed the tail of 322P/SOHO at a distance of 0.012 AU (1.8 million km), making direct measurements of the comet as it interacted with the solar wind.

== See also ==
- List of minor planets and comets visited by spacecraft

Numbered comets
Previous; 321P/SOHO	322P/SOHO	Next; 323P/SOHO
