= Comet Ryves =

Comet

C/1931 P1 (Ryves)
Discovery
- Discovered by: Percy Mayow Ryves
- Discovery site: Zaragoza, Spain
- Discovery date: 10 August 1931

Designations
- Alternative designations: 1931c 1931 IV

Orbital characteristics
- Epoch: 7 August 1931 (JD 2426560.5)
- Observation arc: 96 days
- Number of observations: 25
- Aphelion: 222.25 AU
- Perihelion: 0.0749 AU
- Semi-major axis: 111.16 AU
- Eccentricity: 0.999326
- Orbital period: 1,173 years
- Inclination: 169.29°
- Longitude of ascending node: 102.28°
- Argument of periapsis: 168.15°
- Last perihelion: 25 August 1931
- T_{Jupiter}: –0.287

Physical characteristics
- Apparent magnitude: 4.0 (1931 apparition)

Ryves's Comet, also known as C/1931 P1, 1931 IV or 1931c, was discovered by Percy Mayow Ryves, an English amateur astronomer, on 10 August 1931. The comet passed perihelion on 25 August 1931 at a distance of 0.075 AU (11.2 million km; 7.0 million mi) from the Sun.

== Observational history ==
The comet was discovered by amateur astronomer Percy Mayow Ryves on 10 August 1931. His find was made using a small telescope in Zaragoza, Spain. He noted that the comet was faintly visible with naked eye. The comet was later observed from the Yerkes Observatory and the University of California Leuschner Observatory. George van Biesbroeck observed the comet on 14 August 1931 and noted it had a tail one degree long and estimated its apparent magnitude to be 4.

It appeared as a ball of hot gas traveling at one hundred miles per second from the Naval Observatory. Soon the comet became unobservable as it passed between the Sun and Earth. The comet passed within 0.075 AU (11.2 million km; 7.0 million mi) of the Sun on August 25. It is estimated that became as bright as Venus, however it was too close to the Sun and the horizon to be observed. It then moved towards the far side of the Sun.

Ryves Comet was recovered in early October and its brightness was estimated to be of ninth magnitude by October 9, 1931, and was not observable with the naked eye. Astronomers at the Yerkes Observatory waited until just prior to dawn to observe and photograph it. The comet came into view just ahead of the Sun. Yerkes Observatory director, Edwin B. Frost, determined that Ryves's Comet was two hours east of the Sun and seven degrees removed from it. In October it was one hundred times fainter than when it was first observed in August. Its coma had then an estimated diameter of 3−4 arcminutes and its tail was estimated photographically to be three quarters of a degree long and facing towards the Sun.

Its orbit indicates that it approached Jupiter down to 0.15 AU (22 million km; 14 million mi) resulting to a hyperbolic orbit before perihelion.
