= 323P/SOHO =

Sungrazing comet

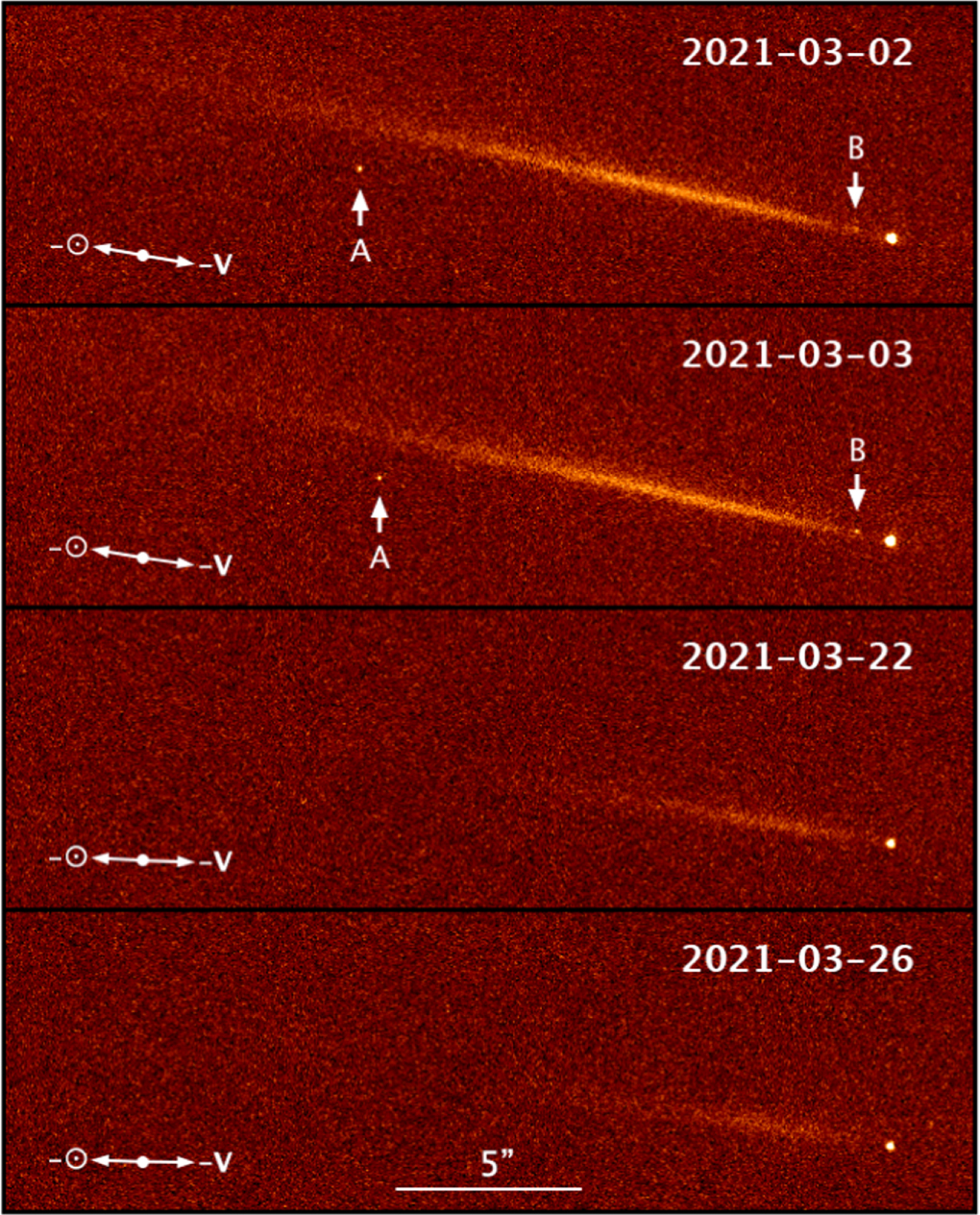
- Comet 323P SOHO by Hubble Space Telescope in March 2021

Discovery
- Discovered by: SOHO
- Discovery date: 12 March 2004

Designations
- Alternative designations: P/1999 X3, P/2004 E2, P/2008 K10, P/2012 Q2

Orbital characteristics
- Epoch: 12 February 2021
- Earliest precovery date: 12 December 1999
- Aphelion: 5.125 AU
- Perihelion: 0.039 AU
- Semi-major axis: 2.582 AU
- Eccentricity: 0.9848
- Orbital period: 4.15 years
- Inclination: 5.37°
- Longitude of ascending node: 324.23°
- Argument of periapsis: 353.17°
- Last perihelion: 14 March 2025; 17 January 2021
- Next perihelion: 12 February 2029 (Yoshida); 17 June 2029 (JPL)
- Earth MOID: 0.022 AU
- Jupiter MOID: 0.221 AU

Physical characteristics
- Mean diameter: 172±6 m
- Synodic rotation period: 0.522 hours
- Spectral type: (V–R) = 0.13±0.09
- Comet total magnitude (M1): 23.6

323P/SOHO is a periodic comet with an orbital period of 4.15 years discovered in images obtained by the Solar and Heliospheric Observatory (SOHO). It is considered to be a sungrazing comet due to its perihelion being very close to the Sun. 323P/SOHO has the smallest perihelion of all numbered comets. It should come to perihelion next around Feb–June 2029.

== Observational history ==
The comet was first noticed by Rainer Kracht in images obtained on 12 March 2004, getting the name C/2004 E2. In 2006 it was published that a very faint comet was visible in SOHO images obtained on 12 December 1999. R. Kracht identified these two objects as being the same comet that had been observed by SOHO on 30 May 2008, a link subsequently confirmed by Brian G. Marsden.

In late December 2020, the object was recovered at Subaru showing no cometary features on its way to perihelion. However, in postperihelion observations, it developed a long narrow tail mimicking a disintegrated comet. The ejecta, composed of at least millimeter-sized dust with a power law size distribution index of 3.2 ± 0.2, was impulsively produced shortly after the perihelion passage, during which ≳0.1%–10% of the nucleus mass was shed due to excessive thermal stress and rotational disruption. Two fragments of ~20 m in radius (assuming a geometric albedo of 0.15) were seen in Hubble Space Telescope observations from early March 2021.

== Physical characteristics ==
The comet has a convex shaped nucleus, based on its light curve, with approximate axis ratios of R2/R1 ≈ 0.8 and R3/R1 ≈ 0.7 and an equivalent radius of 86 ± 3 m (assuming a geometric albedo of 0.15). The comet has a rotation period of 0.522 hours, which is the shortest for known comets in the Solar System. The next fastest rotating comet is 322P/SOHO, with a period of 2.8 hours. The spin axis is oriented toward the southern ecliptic hemisphere.

On 13 February 2021, the g − r color turned redder as the aperture radius grew, suggesting that the dust ejecta was redder than the nucleus. However, on March 3, the trend became the opposite, which means that the nucleus was bluer than the dust ejecta. As for the r − i color, no strong spatial variation in the color measurements was noticed, indicative of similar colors between the dust ejecta and the nucleus, which is also consistent with the annular aperture measurements. The change of the color was possibly related to the mass loss around perihelion and intense solar heating.

== Orbit ==
323P approaches the Sun during perihelion at a distance of 0.04 AU (6.0 million km; 3.7 million mi) or ~8.4 solar radii, closer than any other numbered comet. Its orbital period is 4.15 years. The comet does not belong to any known group of near-Sun comets. 323P/SOHO was originally a Jupiter family comet, but its perihelion distance has been generically decreasing over the past two millennia. 323P has a likelihood of 99.7% to collide with the Sun within the next two millennia.

Numbered comets
Previous; 322P/SOHO	323P/SOHO	Next; 324P/La Sagra
