= 325P/Yang–Gao =

Jupiter-family comet

Discovery
- Discovered by: Yang Rui; Gao Xing
- Discovery site: Xingming Observatory
- Discovery date: 15 June 2009

Designations
- MPC designation: X/1951 K1; P/2009 L2; P/2015 J4

Orbital characteristics
- Epoch: 21 November 2025 (JD 2461000.5)
- Observation arc: 71.33 years (Note: Observation arc from the Minor Planet Center database covering dates from 28 May 1951 until 24 September 2022.)
- Earliest precovery date: 28 May 1951
- Number of observations: 1,380
- Aphelion: 5.634 AU
- Perihelion: 1.468 AU
- Semi-major axis: 3.551 AU
- Eccentricity: 0.58666
- Orbital period: 6.691 years
- Inclination: 16.840°
- Longitude of ascending node: 256.86°
- Argument of periapsis: 344.88°
- Mean anomaly: 197.28°
- Last perihelion: 29 March 2022
- Next perihelion: 29 November 2028
- T_{Jupiter}: 2.741
- Earth MOID: 0.269 AU
- Jupiter MOID: 0.086 AU

Physical characteristics
- Mean radius: 0.705 km (0.438 mi)
- Comet total magnitude (M1): 15.4

Comet Yang–Gao, also known as 325P/Yang–Gao, is a Jupiter-family comet with a 6.69-year orbit around the Sun. It was co-discovered by two Chinese astronomers, Yang Rui and Gao Xing.

== Observational history ==
Yang Rui and Gao Xing discovered a new object from photographic plates that Gao took from the Xingming Observatory on the night of 15 June 2009, with Yang identifying its cometary nature. Follow-up observations by Ernesto Guido and Leonid Elenin confirmed the existence of the new comet the following day, and Brian G. Marsden determined it to be a periodic comet with a 6.64-year orbit. Alexander Baransky and other astronomers at the Kyiv Observatory provided additional astrometry for the comet on July 2009.

Hirohisa Sato recovered Yang–Gao on its next apparition on 11 May 2015, only 0.1 days off from Marsden's predictions in 2009. The comet later received its official numerical designation (325P) on January 2017.

In 2020, Maik Meyer and Gary W. Kronk identified a previously lost comet, X/1951 K1, as an earlier apparition of 325P/Yang–Gao, where Meyer noted that the position of X/1951 K1 was surprisingly close to the predicted position of 325P at the time. It was observed from the McDonald Observatory by Cornelis Johannes van Houten on 28 May 1951 as a diffuse 14th-magnitude object in the night sky, however it wasn't reported until March 1954, nearly three years after it was first observed.

== Physical characteristics ==
Data from infrared observations conducted by NEOWISE, with supplemental data from the Spitzer Space Telescope, estimated that the nucleus of Comet Yang–Gao is no larger than 1.41 km (0.88 mi) in diameter.

== Notes ==
Numbered comets
Previous; 324P/La Sagra	325P/Yang–Gao	Next; 326P/Hill
