= List of minor planets: 36001–37000 =

The following is a partial list of minor planets, running from minor-planet number 36001 through 37000, inclusive. The primary data for this and other partial lists is based on JPL's "Small-Body Orbital Elements" and data available from the Minor Planet Center. Critical list information is also provided by the MPC, unless otherwise specified from Lowell Observatory. A detailed description of the table's columns and additional sources are given on the main page including a complete list of every page in this series, and a statistical break-up on the dynamical classification of minor planets.

Also see the summary list of all named bodies in numerical and alphabetical order, and the corresponding naming citations for the number range of this particular list. New namings may only be added to this list after official publication, as the preannouncement of names is condemned by the Working Group for Small Bodies Nomenclature of the International Astronomical Union.

Near-Earth obj.	MBA (inner)	MBA (outer)	Centaur
Mars-crosser	MBA (middle)	Jupiter trojan	Trans-Neptunian obj.
Unclassified

== 36001–36100 ==
Designation			Discovery			Properties		Ref
Permanent	Provisional	Named after	Date	Site	Discoverer(s)	Category	Diam.	Ref
36001	1999 ND_{23}	—	July 14, 1999	Socorro	LINEAR	GEF · slow	3.8 km	MPC · JPL
36002	1999 NA_{24}	—	July 14, 1999	Socorro	LINEAR	HNS	3.3 km	MPC · JPL
36003	1999 NX_{24}	—	July 14, 1999	Socorro	LINEAR	NYS	3.0 km	MPC · JPL
36004	1999 NB_{25}	—	July 14, 1999	Socorro	LINEAR	·	2.1 km	MPC · JPL
36005	1999 NH_{25}	—	July 14, 1999	Socorro	LINEAR	GEF	3.7 km	MPC · JPL
36006	1999 NS_{26}	—	July 14, 1999	Socorro	LINEAR	·	3.8 km	MPC · JPL
36007	1999 NJ_{31}	—	July 14, 1999	Socorro	LINEAR	NYS	3.4 km	MPC · JPL
36008	1999 NH_{32}	—	July 14, 1999	Socorro	LINEAR	·	3.6 km	MPC · JPL
36009	1999 NA_{35}	—	July 14, 1999	Socorro	LINEAR	·	9.6 km	MPC · JPL
36010	1999 NH_{37}	—	July 14, 1999	Socorro	LINEAR	EOS	6.7 km	MPC · JPL
36011	1999 NM_{37}	—	July 14, 1999	Socorro	LINEAR	EUN	3.6 km	MPC · JPL
36012	1999 NC_{39}	—	July 14, 1999	Socorro	LINEAR	·	9.9 km	MPC · JPL
36013	1999 NZ_{39}	—	July 14, 1999	Socorro	LINEAR	·	5.2 km	MPC · JPL
36014	1999 NJ_{40}	—	July 14, 1999	Socorro	LINEAR	·	3.7 km	MPC · JPL
36015	1999 NN_{40}	—	July 14, 1999	Socorro	LINEAR	GEF	3.0 km	MPC · JPL
36016	1999 ND_{41}	—	July 14, 1999	Socorro	LINEAR	·	5.0 km	MPC · JPL
36017	1999 ND_{43}	—	July 14, 1999	Socorro	LINEAR	AMO	490 m	MPC · JPL
36018	1999 NA_{46}	—	July 13, 1999	Socorro	LINEAR	·	13 km	MPC · JPL
36019	1999 NE_{48}	—	July 13, 1999	Socorro	LINEAR	EUN	5.0 km	MPC · JPL
36020	1999 NL_{48}	—	July 13, 1999	Socorro	LINEAR	EOS ·	4.3 km	MPC · JPL
36021	1999 NH_{49}	—	July 13, 1999	Socorro	LINEAR	V	3.3 km	MPC · JPL
36022	1999 NQ_{49}	—	July 13, 1999	Socorro	LINEAR	EUN	3.2 km	MPC · JPL
36023	1999 NS_{49}	—	July 13, 1999	Socorro	LINEAR	·	10 km	MPC · JPL
36024	1999 NW_{50}	—	July 14, 1999	Socorro	LINEAR	·	2.3 km	MPC · JPL
36025	1999 NY_{50}	—	July 14, 1999	Socorro	LINEAR	NYS	1.9 km	MPC · JPL
36026	1999 NZ_{52}	—	July 12, 1999	Socorro	LINEAR	·	15 km	MPC · JPL
36027	1999 NZ_{55}	—	July 12, 1999	Socorro	LINEAR	EUN	4.4 km	MPC · JPL
36028	1999 NA_{57}	—	July 12, 1999	Socorro	LINEAR	EUN	4.2 km	MPC · JPL
36029	1999 NF_{57}	—	July 12, 1999	Socorro	LINEAR	·	4.8 km	MPC · JPL
36030	1999 NR_{59}	—	July 13, 1999	Socorro	LINEAR	·	14 km	MPC · JPL
36031	1999 NG_{64}	—	July 10, 1999	Wise	Wise	·	4.6 km	MPC · JPL
36032	1999 OC	—	July 16, 1999	Višnjan Observatory	K. Korlević	·	6.7 km	MPC · JPL
36033 Viseggi	1999 OC_{1}	Viseggi	July 19, 1999	Monte Viseggi	Viseggi, Monte	fast	5.9 km	MPC · JPL
36034	1999 OK_{3}	—	July 24, 1999	Farra d'Isonzo	Farra d'Isonzo	·	5.1 km	MPC · JPL
36035 Petrvok	1999 PV	Petrvok	August 6, 1999	Kleť	J. Tichá, M. Tichý	EUN	5.8 km	MPC · JPL
36036 Bonucci	1999 PQ_{1}	Bonucci	August 8, 1999	Saji	Saji	KOR	3.5 km	MPC · JPL
36037 Linenschmidt	1999 PQ_{3}	Linenschmidt	August 13, 1999	Nacogdoches	Bruton, W. D., Stewart, C. F.	EOS	3.7 km	MPC · JPL
36038	1999 PU_{3}	—	August 13, 1999	Kitt Peak	Spacewatch	·	6.7 km	MPC · JPL
36039 Joandunham	1999 PA_{4}	Joandunham	August 13, 1999	Reedy Creek	J. Broughton	·	8.9 km	MPC · JPL
36040	1999 PF_{6}	—	August 13, 1999	Kitt Peak	Spacewatch	·	3.4 km	MPC · JPL
36041	1999 QU	—	August 17, 1999	Kitt Peak	Spacewatch	·	5.4 km	MPC · JPL
36042	1999 QB_{3}	—	August 21, 1999	Kitt Peak	Spacewatch	·	9.2 km	MPC · JPL
36043	1999 RN_{2}	—	September 4, 1999	Catalina	CSS	EOS	7.1 km	MPC · JPL
36044	1999 RA_{10}	—	September 7, 1999	Kitt Peak	Spacewatch	·	4.1 km	MPC · JPL
36045	1999 RZ_{12}	—	September 7, 1999	Socorro	LINEAR	EOS	5.8 km	MPC · JPL
36046	1999 RH_{14}	—	September 7, 1999	Socorro	LINEAR	EOS	5.2 km	MPC · JPL
36047	1999 RY_{14}	—	September 7, 1999	Socorro	LINEAR	EOS	4.9 km	MPC · JPL
36048	1999 RR_{17}	—	September 7, 1999	Socorro	LINEAR	GEF	3.5 km	MPC · JPL
36049	1999 RB_{18}	—	September 7, 1999	Socorro	LINEAR	·	5.5 km	MPC · JPL
36050	1999 RE_{18}	—	September 7, 1999	Socorro	LINEAR	·	5.5 km	MPC · JPL
36051	1999 RO_{19}	—	September 7, 1999	Socorro	LINEAR	(21344)	4.7 km	MPC · JPL
36052	1999 RS_{19}	—	September 7, 1999	Socorro	LINEAR	·	5.4 km	MPC · JPL
36053	1999 RY_{23}	—	September 7, 1999	Socorro	LINEAR	EOS	5.2 km	MPC · JPL
36054	1999 RJ_{24}	—	September 7, 1999	Socorro	LINEAR	·	5.0 km	MPC · JPL
36055	1999 RP_{31}	—	September 5, 1999	Ondřejov	L. Kotková	KOR	3.5 km	MPC · JPL
36056	1999 RX_{32}	—	September 8, 1999	Črni Vrh	Mikuž, H.	KOR	6.7 km	MPC · JPL
36057	1999 RC_{33}	—	September 10, 1999	Saint-Michel-sur-Meurthe	L. Bernasconi	·	5.8 km	MPC · JPL
36058	1999 RM_{35}	—	September 10, 1999	Višnjan Observatory	K. Korlević	·	8.8 km	MPC · JPL
36059	1999 RT_{39}	—	September 7, 1999	Catalina	CSS	EOS	6.3 km	MPC · JPL
36060 Babuška	1999 RM_{43}	Babuška	September 14, 1999	Ondřejov	P. Pravec, P. Kušnirák	·	3.0 km	MPC · JPL
36061 Haldane	1999 RJ_{44}	Haldane	September 11, 1999	Monte Agliale	Santangelo, M. M. M.	·	8.1 km	MPC · JPL
36062	1999 RB_{47}	—	September 7, 1999	Socorro	LINEAR	·	12 km	MPC · JPL
36063	1999 RD_{47}	—	September 7, 1999	Socorro	LINEAR	HNS	4.3 km	MPC · JPL
36064	1999 RR_{47}	—	September 7, 1999	Socorro	LINEAR	·	5.6 km	MPC · JPL
36065	1999 RX_{48}	—	September 7, 1999	Socorro	LINEAR	·	7.7 km	MPC · JPL
36066	1999 RW_{49}	—	September 7, 1999	Socorro	LINEAR	KOR	4.2 km	MPC · JPL
36067	1999 RD_{50}	—	September 7, 1999	Socorro	LINEAR	HYG	6.3 km	MPC · JPL
36068	1999 RN_{51}	—	September 7, 1999	Socorro	LINEAR	·	5.4 km	MPC · JPL
36069	1999 RV_{52}	—	September 7, 1999	Socorro	LINEAR	·	7.8 km	MPC · JPL
36070	1999 RQ_{53}	—	September 7, 1999	Socorro	LINEAR	·	11 km	MPC · JPL
36071	1999 RG_{56}	—	September 7, 1999	Kitt Peak	Spacewatch	·	3.0 km	MPC · JPL
36072	1999 RJ_{56}	—	September 7, 1999	Socorro	LINEAR	·	4.6 km	MPC · JPL
36073	1999 RX_{56}	—	September 7, 1999	Socorro	LINEAR	·	3.5 km	MPC · JPL
36074	1999 RF_{58}	—	September 7, 1999	Socorro	LINEAR	·	4.2 km	MPC · JPL
36075	1999 RU_{59}	—	September 7, 1999	Socorro	LINEAR	·	11 km	MPC · JPL
36076	1999 RW_{60}	—	September 7, 1999	Socorro	LINEAR	·	5.4 km	MPC · JPL
36077	1999 RL_{61}	—	September 7, 1999	Socorro	LINEAR	THM	8.0 km	MPC · JPL
36078	1999 RK_{62}	—	September 7, 1999	Socorro	LINEAR	·	6.2 km	MPC · JPL
36079	1999 RH_{63}	—	September 7, 1999	Socorro	LINEAR	·	3.1 km	MPC · JPL
36080	1999 RF_{64}	—	September 7, 1999	Socorro	LINEAR	EOS	4.7 km	MPC · JPL
36081	1999 RG_{71}	—	September 7, 1999	Socorro	LINEAR	EOS	8.4 km	MPC · JPL
36082	1999 RQ_{77}	—	September 7, 1999	Socorro	LINEAR	·	8.4 km	MPC · JPL
36083	1999 RV_{81}	—	September 7, 1999	Socorro	LINEAR	HYG	9.0 km	MPC · JPL
36084	1999 RR_{85}	—	September 7, 1999	Socorro	LINEAR	EOS	5.8 km	MPC · JPL
36085	1999 RT_{85}	—	September 7, 1999	Socorro	LINEAR	EOS · fast	7.0 km	MPC · JPL
36086	1999 RW_{86}	—	September 7, 1999	Socorro	LINEAR	·	10 km	MPC · JPL
36087	1999 RF_{88}	—	September 7, 1999	Socorro	LINEAR	·	6.7 km	MPC · JPL
36088	1999 RD_{92}	—	September 7, 1999	Socorro	LINEAR	·	5.0 km	MPC · JPL
36089	1999 RN_{92}	—	September 7, 1999	Socorro	LINEAR	THM	6.7 km	MPC · JPL
36090	1999 RN_{100}	—	September 8, 1999	Socorro	LINEAR	EOS	6.0 km	MPC · JPL
36091	1999 RS_{100}	—	September 8, 1999	Socorro	LINEAR	EOS	6.2 km	MPC · JPL
36092	1999 RS_{102}	—	September 8, 1999	Socorro	LINEAR	EOS	5.3 km	MPC · JPL
36093	1999 RA_{103}	—	September 8, 1999	Socorro	LINEAR	·	12 km	MPC · JPL
36094	1999 RM_{108}	—	September 8, 1999	Socorro	LINEAR	EOS ·	5.4 km	MPC · JPL
36095	1999 RL_{109}	—	September 8, 1999	Socorro	LINEAR	·	7.9 km	MPC · JPL
36096	1999 RU_{110}	—	September 8, 1999	Socorro	LINEAR	·	11 km	MPC · JPL
36097	1999 RH_{112}	—	September 9, 1999	Socorro	LINEAR	·	4.3 km	MPC · JPL
36098	1999 RW_{112}	—	September 9, 1999	Socorro	LINEAR	EOS	6.3 km	MPC · JPL
36099	1999 RE_{113}	—	September 9, 1999	Socorro	LINEAR	EUN	3.5 km	MPC · JPL
36100	1999 RC_{114}	—	September 9, 1999	Socorro	LINEAR	·	7.2 km	MPC · JPL

== 36101–36200 ==
back to top

Designation			Discovery			Properties		Ref
Permanent	Provisional	Named after	Date	Site	Discoverer(s)	Category	Diam.	Ref
36101	1999 RY_{115}	—	September 9, 1999	Socorro	LINEAR	EOS	7.8 km	MPC · JPL
36102	1999 RA_{116}	—	September 9, 1999	Socorro	LINEAR	·	4.4 km	MPC · JPL
36103	1999 RL_{116}	—	September 9, 1999	Socorro	LINEAR	EOS · slow	5.7 km	MPC · JPL
36104	1999 RY_{116}	—	September 9, 1999	Socorro	LINEAR	EUN	4.3 km	MPC · JPL
36105	1999 RF_{118}	—	September 9, 1999	Socorro	LINEAR	·	4.4 km	MPC · JPL
36106	1999 RN_{119}	—	September 9, 1999	Socorro	LINEAR	EUN	4.4 km	MPC · JPL
36107	1999 RV_{119}	—	September 9, 1999	Socorro	LINEAR	·	8.3 km	MPC · JPL
36108	1999 RK_{120}	—	September 9, 1999	Socorro	LINEAR	·	2.9 km	MPC · JPL
36109	1999 RB_{122}	—	September 9, 1999	Socorro	LINEAR	HYG	7.4 km	MPC · JPL
36110	1999 RV_{122}	—	September 9, 1999	Socorro	LINEAR	·	5.2 km	MPC · JPL
36111	1999 RL_{126}	—	September 9, 1999	Socorro	LINEAR	·	3.9 km	MPC · JPL
36112	1999 RB_{129}	—	September 9, 1999	Socorro	LINEAR	·	13 km	MPC · JPL
36113	1999 RY_{129}	—	September 9, 1999	Socorro	LINEAR	THM	8.2 km	MPC · JPL
36114	1999 RA_{130}	—	September 9, 1999	Socorro	LINEAR	NYS	2.5 km	MPC · JPL
36115	1999 RH_{133}	—	September 9, 1999	Socorro	LINEAR	GEF	4.4 km	MPC · JPL
36116	1999 RY_{133}	—	September 9, 1999	Socorro	LINEAR	·	8.2 km	MPC · JPL
36117	1999 RD_{135}	—	September 9, 1999	Socorro	LINEAR	EOS	7.5 km	MPC · JPL
36118	1999 RE_{135}	—	September 9, 1999	Socorro	LINEAR	·	5.0 km	MPC · JPL
36119	1999 RQ_{135}	—	September 9, 1999	Socorro	LINEAR	·	2.1 km	MPC · JPL
36120	1999 RS_{136}	—	September 9, 1999	Socorro	LINEAR	EOS	5.2 km	MPC · JPL
36121	1999 RO_{143}	—	September 9, 1999	Socorro	LINEAR	·	6.8 km	MPC · JPL
36122	1999 RG_{145}	—	September 9, 1999	Socorro	LINEAR	·	3.7 km	MPC · JPL
36123	1999 RS_{146}	—	September 9, 1999	Socorro	LINEAR	EOS	6.3 km	MPC · JPL
36124	1999 RF_{147}	—	September 9, 1999	Socorro	LINEAR	GEF	4.4 km	MPC · JPL
36125	1999 RG_{147}	—	September 9, 1999	Socorro	LINEAR	EOS	5.7 km	MPC · JPL
36126	1999 RH_{148}	—	September 9, 1999	Socorro	LINEAR	·	3.6 km	MPC · JPL
36127	1999 RJ_{150}	—	September 9, 1999	Socorro	LINEAR	·	5.9 km	MPC · JPL
36128	1999 RK_{151}	—	September 9, 1999	Socorro	LINEAR	KOR	4.8 km	MPC · JPL
36129	1999 RW_{156}	—	September 9, 1999	Socorro	LINEAR	KOR	4.8 km	MPC · JPL
36130	1999 RG_{157}	—	September 9, 1999	Socorro	LINEAR	·	5.4 km	MPC · JPL
36131	1999 RN_{158}	—	September 9, 1999	Socorro	LINEAR	EOS	5.2 km	MPC · JPL
36132	1999 RU_{158}	—	September 9, 1999	Socorro	LINEAR	EOS	7.2 km	MPC · JPL
36133	1999 RJ_{159}	—	September 9, 1999	Socorro	LINEAR	KOR	4.4 km	MPC · JPL
36134	1999 RS_{162}	—	September 9, 1999	Socorro	LINEAR	·	4.2 km	MPC · JPL
36135	1999 RO_{163}	—	September 9, 1999	Socorro	LINEAR	·	3.7 km	MPC · JPL
36136	1999 RR_{165}	—	September 9, 1999	Socorro	LINEAR	·	10 km	MPC · JPL
36137	1999 RV_{167}	—	September 9, 1999	Socorro	LINEAR	·	9.2 km	MPC · JPL
36138	1999 RW_{167}	—	September 9, 1999	Socorro	LINEAR	·	9.1 km	MPC · JPL
36139	1999 RY_{167}	—	September 9, 1999	Socorro	LINEAR	·	8.7 km	MPC · JPL
36140	1999 RC_{168}	—	September 9, 1999	Socorro	LINEAR	2:1J	6.9 km	MPC · JPL
36141	1999 RF_{170}	—	September 9, 1999	Socorro	LINEAR	·	6.4 km	MPC · JPL
36142	1999 RA_{173}	—	September 9, 1999	Socorro	LINEAR	·	9.6 km	MPC · JPL
36143	1999 RR_{173}	—	September 9, 1999	Socorro	LINEAR	EOS	7.7 km	MPC · JPL
36144	1999 RT_{173}	—	September 9, 1999	Socorro	LINEAR	·	8.2 km	MPC · JPL
36145	1999 RK_{178}	—	September 9, 1999	Socorro	LINEAR	·	12 km	MPC · JPL
36146	1999 RX_{181}	—	September 9, 1999	Socorro	LINEAR	·	11 km	MPC · JPL
36147	1999 RA_{186}	—	September 9, 1999	Socorro	LINEAR	THM	10 km	MPC · JPL
36148	1999 RF_{192}	—	September 13, 1999	Socorro	LINEAR	EOS	6.3 km	MPC · JPL
36149	1999 RQ_{192}	—	September 13, 1999	Socorro	LINEAR	·	5.8 km	MPC · JPL
36150	1999 RE_{193}	—	September 13, 1999	Socorro	LINEAR	·	12 km	MPC · JPL
36151	1999 RG_{193}	—	September 13, 1999	Socorro	LINEAR	EOS	11 km	MPC · JPL
36152	1999 RE_{196}	—	September 8, 1999	Socorro	LINEAR	EOS ·	6.4 km	MPC · JPL
36153	1999 RF_{201}	—	September 8, 1999	Socorro	LINEAR	·	8.7 km	MPC · JPL
36154	1999 RY_{202}	—	September 8, 1999	Socorro	LINEAR	·	10 km	MPC · JPL
36155	1999 RO_{206}	—	September 8, 1999	Socorro	LINEAR	·	12 km	MPC · JPL
36156	1999 RQ_{206}	—	September 8, 1999	Socorro	LINEAR	(1118)	18 km	MPC · JPL
36157	1999 RH_{210}	—	September 8, 1999	Socorro	LINEAR	EOS	7.2 km	MPC · JPL
36158	1999 RL_{216}	—	September 8, 1999	Socorro	LINEAR	·	10 km	MPC · JPL
36159	1999 RZ_{217}	—	September 4, 1999	Catalina	CSS	·	5.1 km	MPC · JPL
36160	1999 RZ_{218}	—	September 5, 1999	Anderson Mesa	LONEOS	EOS	6.2 km	MPC · JPL
36161	1999 RB_{220}	—	September 4, 1999	Anderson Mesa	LONEOS	EOS	6.2 km	MPC · JPL
36162	1999 RX_{221}	—	September 6, 1999	Catalina	CSS	·	8.2 km	MPC · JPL
36163	1999 RQ_{222}	—	September 7, 1999	Catalina	CSS	·	10 km	MPC · JPL
36164	1999 RN_{226}	—	September 5, 1999	Catalina	CSS	·	6.7 km	MPC · JPL
36165	1999 RB_{227}	—	September 5, 1999	Catalina	CSS	·	4.8 km	MPC · JPL
36166	1999 RY_{228}	—	September 5, 1999	Kitt Peak	Spacewatch	·	4.1 km	MPC · JPL
36167	1999 RG_{230}	—	September 8, 1999	Catalina	CSS	·	9.7 km	MPC · JPL
36168	1999 RF_{233}	—	September 8, 1999	Catalina	CSS	EOS	6.7 km	MPC · JPL
36169 Grosseteste	1999 RG_{240}	Grosseteste	September 11, 1999	Anderson Mesa	LONEOS	EOS	6.0 km	MPC · JPL
36170	1999 RC_{242}	—	September 12, 1999	Anderson Mesa	LONEOS	EOS	6.4 km	MPC · JPL
36171	1999 RM_{242}	—	September 4, 1999	Anderson Mesa	LONEOS	·	7.9 km	MPC · JPL
36172	1999 RH_{247}	—	September 4, 1999	Kitt Peak	Spacewatch	·	5.4 km	MPC · JPL
36173	1999 SN_{1}	—	September 17, 1999	Višnjan Observatory	K. Korlević	EUN	6.0 km	MPC · JPL
36174 Podolský	1999 SW_{2}	Podolský	September 23, 1999	Ondřejov	M. Wolf, L. Kotková	·	6.9 km	MPC · JPL
36175	1999 ST_{6}	—	September 30, 1999	Socorro	LINEAR	·	9.1 km	MPC · JPL
36176	1999 SR_{9}	—	September 29, 1999	Višnjan Observatory	K. Korlević	·	2.6 km	MPC · JPL
36177 Tonysharon	1999 SJ_{14}	Tonysharon	September 30, 1999	Socorro	LINEAR	·	7.6 km	MPC · JPL
36178	1999 SP_{16}	—	September 29, 1999	Catalina	CSS	·	9.3 km	MPC · JPL
36179	1999 SP_{19}	—	September 30, 1999	Socorro	LINEAR	·	7.7 km	MPC · JPL
36180	1999 SQ_{19}	—	September 30, 1999	Socorro	LINEAR	·	11 km	MPC · JPL
36181	1999 TT_{10}	—	October 8, 1999	Višnjan Observatory	K. Korlević, M. Jurić	EOS	9.8 km	MPC · JPL
36182 Montigiani	1999 TY_{12}	Montigiani	October 10, 1999	Monte Agliale	Santangelo, M. M. M.	3:2	12 km	MPC · JPL
36183	1999 TX_{16}	—	October 13, 1999	Socorro	LINEAR	AMO +1km	2.3 km	MPC · JPL
36184 Pavelbožek	1999 TQ_{17}	Pavelbožek	October 14, 1999	Ondřejov	L. Kotková	MAS	1.4 km	MPC · JPL
36185	1999 TG_{25}	—	October 3, 1999	Socorro	LINEAR	DOR	10 km	MPC · JPL
36186	1999 TC_{31}	—	October 4, 1999	Socorro	LINEAR	·	12 km	MPC · JPL
36187 Travisbarman	1999 TB_{37}	Travisbarman	October 13, 1999	Anderson Mesa	LONEOS	·	13 km	MPC · JPL
36188	1999 TD_{37}	—	October 13, 1999	Anderson Mesa	LONEOS	·	7.0 km	MPC · JPL
36189	1999 TS_{37}	—	October 1, 1999	Catalina	CSS	·	6.7 km	MPC · JPL
36190	1999 TG_{40}	—	October 5, 1999	Catalina	CSS	ADE	8.6 km	MPC · JPL
36191	1999 TY_{78}	—	October 11, 1999	Kitt Peak	Spacewatch	(3460)	6.1 km	MPC · JPL
36192	1999 TC_{89}	—	October 2, 1999	Socorro	LINEAR	CLO	7.1 km	MPC · JPL
36193	1999 TD_{89}	—	October 2, 1999	Socorro	LINEAR	·	7.7 km	MPC · JPL
36194	1999 TP_{89}	—	October 2, 1999	Socorro	LINEAR	·	4.5 km	MPC · JPL
36195	1999 TG_{90}	—	October 2, 1999	Socorro	LINEAR	·	4.7 km	MPC · JPL
36196	1999 TT_{90}	—	October 2, 1999	Socorro	LINEAR	EOS	7.2 km	MPC · JPL
36197	1999 TZ_{91}	—	October 2, 1999	Socorro	LINEAR	CLO	8.3 km	MPC · JPL
36198	1999 TF_{92}	—	October 2, 1999	Socorro	LINEAR	EOS	10 km	MPC · JPL
36199	1999 TD_{93}	—	October 2, 1999	Socorro	LINEAR	slow	6.4 km	MPC · JPL
36200	1999 TA_{97}	—	October 2, 1999	Socorro	LINEAR	·	6.2 km	MPC · JPL

== 36201–36300 ==
back to top

Designation			Discovery			Properties		Ref
Permanent	Provisional	Named after	Date	Site	Discoverer(s)	Category	Diam.	Ref
36201	1999 TE_{98}	—	October 2, 1999	Socorro	LINEAR	EOS	6.4 km	MPC · JPL
36202	1999 TG_{98}	—	October 2, 1999	Socorro	LINEAR	EOS	6.7 km	MPC · JPL
36203	1999 TZ_{98}	—	October 2, 1999	Socorro	LINEAR	·	11 km	MPC · JPL
36204	1999 TM_{101}	—	October 2, 1999	Socorro	LINEAR	·	14 km	MPC · JPL
36205	1999 TV_{101}	—	October 2, 1999	Socorro	LINEAR	·	15 km	MPC · JPL
36206	1999 TK_{107}	—	October 4, 1999	Socorro	LINEAR	·	4.8 km	MPC · JPL
36207	1999 TB_{110}	—	October 4, 1999	Socorro	LINEAR	·	6.0 km	MPC · JPL
36208	1999 TB_{120}	—	October 4, 1999	Socorro	LINEAR	·	12 km	MPC · JPL
36209	1999 TY_{130}	—	October 6, 1999	Socorro	LINEAR	·	5.2 km	MPC · JPL
36210	1999 TD_{144}	—	October 7, 1999	Socorro	LINEAR	EOS	7.3 km	MPC · JPL
36211	1999 TM_{152}	—	October 7, 1999	Socorro	LINEAR	·	9.0 km	MPC · JPL
36212	1999 TU_{154}	—	October 7, 1999	Socorro	LINEAR	HYG	10 km	MPC · JPL
36213 Robertotisgreen	1999 TU_{158}	Robertotisgreen	October 9, 1999	Socorro	LINEAR	·	6.6 km	MPC · JPL
36214	1999 TH_{201}	—	October 13, 1999	Socorro	LINEAR	·	8.1 km	MPC · JPL
36215	1999 TG_{214}	—	October 15, 1999	Socorro	LINEAR	·	8.4 km	MPC · JPL
36216	1999 TK_{215}	—	October 15, 1999	Socorro	LINEAR	THM	10 km	MPC · JPL
36217	1999 TN_{216}	—	October 15, 1999	Socorro	LINEAR	HYG	9.4 km	MPC · JPL
36218	1999 TK_{220}	—	October 1, 1999	Catalina	CSS	RAF	4.1 km	MPC · JPL
36219	1999 TM_{221}	—	October 2, 1999	Socorro	LINEAR	HYG	10 km	MPC · JPL
36220	1999 TW_{231}	—	October 5, 1999	Catalina	CSS	·	9.5 km	MPC · JPL
36221	1999 TS_{244}	—	October 7, 1999	Catalina	CSS	HYG	8.9 km	MPC · JPL
36222	1999 TG_{246}	—	October 8, 1999	Catalina	CSS	HYG	11 km	MPC · JPL
36223	1999 TJ_{267}	—	October 3, 1999	Socorro	LINEAR	EUN	3.6 km	MPC · JPL
36224	1999 TE_{268}	—	October 3, 1999	Socorro	LINEAR	·	8.8 km	MPC · JPL
36225	1999 TW_{270}	—	October 3, 1999	Socorro	LINEAR	·	7.5 km	MPC · JPL
36226 Mackerras	1999 UQ_{4}	Mackerras	October 31, 1999	Ondřejov	L. Kotková	HYG	9.4 km	MPC · JPL
36227	1999 UR_{5}	—	October 29, 1999	Catalina	CSS	slow?	15 km	MPC · JPL
36228	1999 UK_{9}	—	October 29, 1999	Catalina	CSS	HYG	9.0 km	MPC · JPL
36229	1999 UE_{13}	—	October 29, 1999	Catalina	CSS	·	7.5 km	MPC · JPL
36230	1999 UD_{15}	—	October 29, 1999	Catalina	CSS	EOS	9.9 km	MPC · JPL
36231	1999 UG_{16}	—	October 29, 1999	Catalina	CSS	EOS	7.1 km	MPC · JPL
36232	1999 US_{26}	—	October 30, 1999	Catalina	CSS	HYG	8.5 km	MPC · JPL
36233	1999 UJ_{27}	—	October 30, 1999	Kitt Peak	Spacewatch	·	5.9 km	MPC · JPL
36234	1999 UB_{42}	—	October 20, 1999	Socorro	LINEAR	·	7.8 km	MPC · JPL
36235 Sergebaudo	1999 VJ	Sergebaudo	November 1, 1999	Ondřejov	L. Kotková	MAR	3.3 km	MPC · JPL
36236	1999 VV	—	November 1, 1999	Socorro	LINEAR	APO +1km	2.3 km	MPC · JPL
36237	1999 VX_{11}	—	November 10, 1999	Fountain Hills	C. W. Juels	·	20 km	MPC · JPL
36238	1999 VX_{19}	—	November 8, 1999	Višnjan Observatory	K. Korlević	·	9.5 km	MPC · JPL
36239	1999 VA_{30}	—	November 3, 1999	Socorro	LINEAR	THM	8.1 km	MPC · JPL
36240	1999 VN_{44}	—	November 4, 1999	Catalina	CSS	·	9.4 km	MPC · JPL
36241	1999 VM_{48}	—	November 3, 1999	Socorro	LINEAR	HYG	9.1 km	MPC · JPL
36242	1999 VX_{71}	—	November 5, 1999	Xinglong	SCAP	EOS	6.8 km	MPC · JPL
36243	1999 VP_{81}	—	November 5, 1999	Socorro	LINEAR	·	7.0 km	MPC · JPL
36244	1999 VJ_{85}	—	November 5, 1999	Catalina	CSS	PHO	4.2 km	MPC · JPL
36245	1999 VP_{86}	—	November 5, 1999	Socorro	LINEAR	·	3.4 km	MPC · JPL
36246	1999 VN_{108}	—	November 9, 1999	Socorro	LINEAR	·	3.0 km	MPC · JPL
36247	1999 VY_{155}	—	November 12, 1999	Socorro	LINEAR	MAR	3.9 km	MPC · JPL
36248	1999 VA_{176}	—	November 2, 1999	Catalina	CSS	·	7.3 km	MPC · JPL
36249	1999 VT_{178}	—	November 6, 1999	Socorro	LINEAR	CYB	11 km	MPC · JPL
36250	1999 VB_{179}	—	November 6, 1999	Socorro	LINEAR	EOS	6.9 km	MPC · JPL
36251	1999 VB_{181}	—	November 6, 1999	Socorro	LINEAR	KOR	5.3 km	MPC · JPL
36252	1999 VS_{190}	—	November 15, 1999	Socorro	LINEAR	HOF	6.9 km	MPC · JPL
36253	1999 XT_{11}	—	December 6, 1999	Catalina	CSS	·	11 km	MPC · JPL
36254	1999 XM_{17}	—	December 2, 1999	Socorro	LINEAR	·	8.4 km	MPC · JPL
36255	1999 XR_{17}	—	December 2, 1999	Socorro	LINEAR	EUN	3.4 km	MPC · JPL
36256	1999 XT_{17}	—	December 3, 1999	Socorro	LINEAR	·	10 km	MPC · JPL
36257	1999 XT_{20}	—	December 5, 1999	Socorro	LINEAR	THM ·	5.5 km	MPC · JPL
36258	1999 XG_{73}	—	December 7, 1999	Socorro	LINEAR	NYS	3.2 km	MPC · JPL
36259	1999 XM_{74}	—	December 7, 1999	Socorro	LINEAR	L4	25 km	MPC · JPL
36260	1999 XQ_{111}	—	December 7, 1999	Socorro	LINEAR	·	10 km	MPC · JPL
36261	1999 XE_{116}	—	December 5, 1999	Catalina	CSS	·	5.8 km	MPC · JPL
36262	1999 XO_{117}	—	December 5, 1999	Catalina	CSS	·	13 km	MPC · JPL
36263	1999 XB_{147}	—	December 7, 1999	Kitt Peak	Spacewatch	RAF	3.5 km	MPC · JPL
36264 Kojimatsumoto	1999 XL_{152}	Kojimatsumoto	December 13, 1999	Anderson Mesa	LONEOS	EOS	7.0 km	MPC · JPL
36265	1999 XV_{156}	—	December 8, 1999	Socorro	LINEAR	L4	20 km	MPC · JPL
36266	1999 XA_{192}	—	December 12, 1999	Socorro	LINEAR	·	2.9 km	MPC · JPL
36267	1999 XB_{211}	—	December 13, 1999	Socorro	LINEAR	L4	39 km	MPC · JPL
36268	1999 XT_{213}	—	December 14, 1999	Socorro	LINEAR	L4	20 km	MPC · JPL
36269	1999 XB_{214}	—	December 14, 1999	Socorro	LINEAR	L4	30 km	MPC · JPL
36270	1999 XS_{248}	—	December 6, 1999	Socorro	LINEAR	L4	20 km	MPC · JPL
36271	2000 AV_{19}	—	January 3, 2000	Socorro	LINEAR	L4	20 km	MPC · JPL
36272	2000 AJ_{51}	—	January 4, 2000	Socorro	LINEAR	·	12 km	MPC · JPL
36273	2000 AM_{68}	—	January 5, 2000	Socorro	LINEAR	PAL ·	7.6 km	MPC · JPL
36274	2000 AV_{107}	—	January 5, 2000	Socorro	LINEAR	T_{j} (2.97) · 3:2	18 km	MPC · JPL
36275	2000 AO_{138}	—	January 5, 2000	Socorro	LINEAR	EOS	6.4 km	MPC · JPL
36276	2000 AE_{167}	—	January 8, 2000	Socorro	LINEAR	·	3.1 km	MPC · JPL
36277	2000 AG_{172}	—	January 7, 2000	Socorro	LINEAR	·	4.1 km	MPC · JPL
36278	2000 AG_{229}	—	January 3, 2000	Socorro	LINEAR	TIR	5.9 km	MPC · JPL
36279	2000 BQ_{5}	—	January 27, 2000	Socorro	LINEAR	L4	31 km	MPC · JPL
36280	2000 CJ_{77}	—	February 1, 2000	Ondřejov	P. Kušnirák	·	5.4 km	MPC · JPL
36281	2000 CN_{85}	—	February 4, 2000	Socorro	LINEAR	KOR	3.5 km	MPC · JPL
36282	2000 CT_{98}	—	February 8, 2000	Kitt Peak	Spacewatch	·	2.4 km	MPC · JPL
36283	2000 DV_{3}	—	February 26, 2000	Socorro	LINEAR	H	1.6 km	MPC · JPL
36284	2000 DM_{8}	—	February 27, 2000	Socorro	LINEAR	APO +1km	3.5 km	MPC · JPL
36285	2000 DW_{103}	—	February 29, 2000	Socorro	LINEAR	·	2.3 km	MPC · JPL
36286	2000 EL_{14}	—	March 5, 2000	Višnjan Observatory	K. Korlević	CLA	4.2 km	MPC · JPL
36287	2000 ER_{45}	—	March 9, 2000	Socorro	LINEAR	MAS	2.1 km	MPC · JPL
36288	2000 EQ_{170}	—	March 5, 2000	Socorro	LINEAR	·	3.3 km	MPC · JPL
36289	2000 FP_{11}	—	March 28, 2000	Socorro	LINEAR	URS	21 km	MPC · JPL
36290	2000 FM_{30}	—	March 27, 2000	Anderson Mesa	LONEOS	·	3.9 km	MPC · JPL
36291	2000 GG_{98}	—	April 7, 2000	Socorro	LINEAR	·	5.2 km	MPC · JPL
36292	2000 GX_{122}	—	April 11, 2000	Fountain Hills	C. W. Juels	·	2.2 km	MPC · JPL
36293	2000 GQ_{144}	—	April 7, 2000	Kitt Peak	Spacewatch	·	3.5 km	MPC · JPL
36294	2000 GS_{152}	—	April 6, 2000	Socorro	LINEAR	PHO	5.5 km	MPC · JPL
36295	2000 HV_{30}	—	April 28, 2000	Socorro	LINEAR	·	2.1 km	MPC · JPL
36296	2000 HP_{49}	—	April 29, 2000	Socorro	LINEAR	NYS	3.9 km	MPC · JPL
36297	2000 JM_{5}	—	May 5, 2000	Prescott	P. G. Comba	·	8.2 km	MPC · JPL
36298	2000 JF_{10}	—	May 3, 2000	Socorro	LINEAR	H	2.1 km	MPC · JPL
36299	2000 JA_{16}	—	May 6, 2000	Socorro	LINEAR	H	1.5 km	MPC · JPL
36300	2000 JE_{19}	—	May 3, 2000	Socorro	LINEAR	·	3.4 km	MPC · JPL

== 36301–36400 ==
back to top

Designation			Discovery			Properties		Ref
Permanent	Provisional	Named after	Date	Site	Discoverer(s)	Category	Diam.	Ref
36301	2000 JK_{21}	—	May 6, 2000	Socorro	LINEAR	NYS	3.4 km	MPC · JPL
36302	2000 JX_{33}	—	May 7, 2000	Socorro	LINEAR	NEM	5.1 km	MPC · JPL
36303	2000 JM_{54}	—	May 6, 2000	Socorro	LINEAR	·	2.6 km	MPC · JPL
36304	2000 JY_{56}	—	May 6, 2000	Socorro	LINEAR	(5)	4.3 km	MPC · JPL
36305	2000 JZ_{56}	—	May 6, 2000	Socorro	LINEAR	MAS	1.9 km	MPC · JPL
36306	2000 JK_{58}	—	May 6, 2000	Socorro	LINEAR	·	3.6 km	MPC · JPL
36307	2000 JY_{65}	—	May 6, 2000	Socorro	LINEAR	EUN	5.1 km	MPC · JPL
36308	2000 KX_{3}	—	May 27, 2000	Socorro	LINEAR	·	2.1 km	MPC · JPL
36309	2000 KS_{29}	—	May 28, 2000	Socorro	LINEAR	·	2.0 km	MPC · JPL
36310	2000 KN_{31}	—	May 28, 2000	Socorro	LINEAR	·	4.8 km	MPC · JPL
36311	2000 KK_{48}	—	May 27, 2000	Socorro	LINEAR	·	2.8 km	MPC · JPL
36312	2000 KO_{50}	—	May 27, 2000	Socorro	LINEAR	·	1.6 km	MPC · JPL
36313	2000 KE_{67}	—	May 31, 2000	Socorro	LINEAR	PHO	3.6 km	MPC · JPL
36314	2000 LH_{4}	—	June 4, 2000	Socorro	LINEAR	·	14 km	MPC · JPL
36315	2000 LP_{9}	—	June 5, 2000	Socorro	LINEAR	KOR	6.2 km	MPC · JPL
36316	2000 LC_{12}	—	June 4, 2000	Socorro	LINEAR	H	3.4 km	MPC · JPL
36317	2000 LL_{12}	—	June 5, 2000	Socorro	LINEAR	·	3.5 km	MPC · JPL
36318	2000 LJ_{18}	—	June 8, 2000	Socorro	LINEAR	·	6.2 km	MPC · JPL
36319	2000 LO_{20}	—	June 8, 2000	Socorro	LINEAR	·	2.3 km	MPC · JPL
36320	2000 LD_{23}	—	June 1, 2000	Anderson Mesa	LONEOS	·	2.6 km	MPC · JPL
36321	2000 LS_{23}	—	June 7, 2000	Socorro	LINEAR	PHO	4.2 km	MPC · JPL
36322	2000 LB_{26}	—	June 1, 2000	Socorro	LINEAR	·	2.4 km	MPC · JPL
36323	2000 LF_{27}	—	June 6, 2000	Anderson Mesa	LONEOS	NYS	2.9 km	MPC · JPL
36324	2000 LT_{27}	—	June 6, 2000	Anderson Mesa	LONEOS	(5)	3.6 km	MPC · JPL
36325	2000 LF_{29}	—	June 9, 2000	Anderson Mesa	LONEOS	·	4.0 km	MPC · JPL
36326	2000 LH_{29}	—	June 11, 2000	Anderson Mesa	LONEOS	·	3.3 km	MPC · JPL
36327	2000 LV_{33}	—	June 4, 2000	Haleakala	NEAT	·	2.4 km	MPC · JPL
36328	2000 LR_{35}	—	June 1, 2000	Anderson Mesa	LONEOS	·	2.2 km	MPC · JPL
36329 Philmetzger	2000 LU_{35}	Philmetzger	June 1, 2000	Anderson Mesa	LONEOS	·	4.6 km	MPC · JPL
36330	2000 MF_{5}	—	June 26, 2000	Socorro	LINEAR	·	2.5 km	MPC · JPL
36331	2000 MN_{5}	—	June 26, 2000	Socorro	LINEAR	NYS ·	5.2 km	MPC · JPL
36332	2000 ND_{1}	—	July 2, 2000	Kitt Peak	Spacewatch	(23255)	6.4 km	MPC · JPL
36333	2000 NV_{4}	—	July 7, 2000	Socorro	LINEAR	·	2.2 km	MPC · JPL
36334	2000 NZ_{4}	—	July 7, 2000	Socorro	LINEAR	·	3.7 km	MPC · JPL
36335	2000 NA_{5}	—	July 7, 2000	Socorro	LINEAR	NYS	4.4 km	MPC · JPL
36336	2000 ND_{5}	—	July 7, 2000	Socorro	LINEAR	·	3.5 km	MPC · JPL
36337	2000 NK_{7}	—	July 4, 2000	Kitt Peak	Spacewatch	·	2.1 km	MPC · JPL
36338	2000 NN_{9}	—	July 7, 2000	Socorro	LINEAR	·	10 km	MPC · JPL
36339	2000 NF_{10}	—	July 7, 2000	Ondřejov	P. Kušnirák	·	2.8 km	MPC · JPL
36340 Vaduvescu	2000 NT_{13}	Vaduvescu	July 5, 2000	Anderson Mesa	LONEOS	NYS	3.5 km	MPC · JPL
36341	2000 NS_{15}	—	July 5, 2000	Anderson Mesa	LONEOS	·	2.3 km	MPC · JPL
36342	2000 NX_{15}	—	July 5, 2000	Anderson Mesa	LONEOS	·	5.5 km	MPC · JPL
36343	2000 NZ_{15}	—	July 5, 2000	Anderson Mesa	LONEOS	·	7.6 km	MPC · JPL
36344	2000 NP_{19}	—	July 5, 2000	Anderson Mesa	LONEOS	·	2.5 km	MPC · JPL
36345	2000 NS_{19}	—	July 5, 2000	Anderson Mesa	LONEOS	(5)	2.7 km	MPC · JPL
36346	2000 NE_{20}	—	July 6, 2000	Kitt Peak	Spacewatch	·	8.0 km	MPC · JPL
36347	2000 NT_{21}	—	July 7, 2000	Socorro	LINEAR	·	3.7 km	MPC · JPL
36348	2000 NS_{23}	—	July 5, 2000	Anderson Mesa	LONEOS	·	8.6 km	MPC · JPL
36349	2000 NZ_{23}	—	July 5, 2000	Kitt Peak	Spacewatch	·	3.0 km	MPC · JPL
36350	2000 NP_{24}	—	July 4, 2000	Anderson Mesa	LONEOS	·	5.1 km	MPC · JPL
36351	2000 NW_{24}	—	July 4, 2000	Anderson Mesa	LONEOS	·	2.4 km	MPC · JPL
36352 Erickmeza	2000 NE_{25}	Erickmeza	July 4, 2000	Anderson Mesa	LONEOS	KOR	3.0 km	MPC · JPL
36353	2000 NP_{26}	—	July 4, 2000	Anderson Mesa	LONEOS	·	2.0 km	MPC · JPL
36354	2000 NE_{27}	—	July 4, 2000	Anderson Mesa	LONEOS	·	5.2 km	MPC · JPL
36355	2000 NJ_{27}	—	July 4, 2000	Anderson Mesa	LONEOS	·	2.2 km	MPC · JPL
36356	2000 NY_{28}	—	July 2, 2000	Kitt Peak	Spacewatch	·	2.6 km	MPC · JPL
36357	2000 OQ_{2}	—	July 28, 2000	Črni Vrh	Mikuž, H.	·	2.9 km	MPC · JPL
36358	2000 OY_{2}	—	July 29, 2000	Reedy Creek	J. Broughton	BRG	4.2 km	MPC · JPL
36359	2000 OE_{3}	—	July 23, 2000	Socorro	LINEAR	·	2.1 km	MPC · JPL
36360	2000 OH_{3}	—	July 23, 2000	Socorro	LINEAR	·	4.5 km	MPC · JPL
36361	2000 OS_{4}	—	July 24, 2000	Socorro	LINEAR	·	2.3 km	MPC · JPL
36362	2000 OV_{4}	—	July 24, 2000	Socorro	LINEAR	·	2.6 km	MPC · JPL
36363	2000 OB_{5}	—	July 24, 2000	Socorro	LINEAR	V	2.3 km	MPC · JPL
36364	2000 OT_{5}	—	July 24, 2000	Socorro	LINEAR	·	5.7 km	MPC · JPL
36365	2000 OO_{9}	—	July 30, 2000	Reedy Creek	J. Broughton	EUN	3.9 km	MPC · JPL
36366	2000 OA_{10}	—	July 23, 2000	Socorro	LINEAR	·	1.7 km	MPC · JPL
36367	2000 OF_{12}	—	July 23, 2000	Socorro	LINEAR	·	1.9 km	MPC · JPL
36368	2000 OG_{12}	—	July 23, 2000	Socorro	LINEAR	·	3.5 km	MPC · JPL
36369	2000 OD_{13}	—	July 23, 2000	Socorro	LINEAR	·	2.5 km	MPC · JPL
36370	2000 OT_{14}	—	July 23, 2000	Socorro	LINEAR	NYS	4.3 km	MPC · JPL
36371	2000 OA_{16}	—	July 23, 2000	Socorro	LINEAR	·	3.2 km	MPC · JPL
36372	2000 OD_{16}	—	July 23, 2000	Socorro	LINEAR	MAS	2.0 km	MPC · JPL
36373	2000 OJ_{16}	—	July 23, 2000	Socorro	LINEAR	·	2.9 km	MPC · JPL
36374	2000 OO_{16}	—	July 23, 2000	Socorro	LINEAR	·	2.3 km	MPC · JPL
36375	2000 OT_{16}	—	July 23, 2000	Socorro	LINEAR	·	2.4 km	MPC · JPL
36376	2000 OH_{17}	—	July 23, 2000	Socorro	LINEAR	·	3.2 km	MPC · JPL
36377	2000 OL_{18}	—	July 23, 2000	Socorro	LINEAR	·	2.0 km	MPC · JPL
36378	2000 OL_{19}	—	July 29, 2000	Socorro	LINEAR	·	5.8 km	MPC · JPL
36379	2000 OA_{24}	—	July 23, 2000	Socorro	LINEAR	·	8.0 km	MPC · JPL
36380	2000 OL_{27}	—	July 23, 2000	Socorro	LINEAR	·	5.4 km	MPC · JPL
36381	2000 OW_{27}	—	July 23, 2000	Socorro	LINEAR	·	2.4 km	MPC · JPL
36382	2000 OC_{28}	—	July 24, 2000	Socorro	LINEAR	V	2.0 km	MPC · JPL
36383	2000 OW_{28}	—	July 30, 2000	Socorro	LINEAR	·	3.5 km	MPC · JPL
36384	2000 OJ_{31}	—	July 30, 2000	Socorro	LINEAR	·	2.1 km	MPC · JPL
36385	2000 OT_{31}	—	July 30, 2000	Socorro	LINEAR	·	2.0 km	MPC · JPL
36386	2000 OE_{32}	—	July 30, 2000	Socorro	LINEAR	·	2.6 km	MPC · JPL
36387	2000 OR_{32}	—	July 30, 2000	Socorro	LINEAR	·	2.5 km	MPC · JPL
36388	2000 OY_{32}	—	July 30, 2000	Socorro	LINEAR	·	2.8 km	MPC · JPL
36389	2000 OT_{33}	—	July 30, 2000	Socorro	LINEAR	·	2.0 km	MPC · JPL
36390	2000 OV_{39}	—	July 30, 2000	Socorro	LINEAR	(194)	5.1 km	MPC · JPL
36391	2000 OO_{40}	—	July 30, 2000	Socorro	LINEAR	·	2.1 km	MPC · JPL
36392	2000 OZ_{40}	—	July 30, 2000	Socorro	LINEAR	·	10 km	MPC · JPL
36393	2000 OM_{42}	—	July 30, 2000	Socorro	LINEAR	·	2.5 km	MPC · JPL
36394	2000 OP_{42}	—	July 30, 2000	Socorro	LINEAR	·	3.3 km	MPC · JPL
36395	2000 OS_{42}	—	July 30, 2000	Socorro	LINEAR	(5)	3.3 km	MPC · JPL
36396	2000 OE_{44}	—	July 30, 2000	Socorro	LINEAR	V · slow	1.8 km	MPC · JPL
36397	2000 OL_{44}	—	July 30, 2000	Socorro	LINEAR	·	6.5 km	MPC · JPL
36398	2000 OQ_{45}	—	July 30, 2000	Socorro	LINEAR	·	4.7 km	MPC · JPL
36399	2000 OV_{46}	—	July 31, 2000	Socorro	LINEAR	·	2.7 km	MPC · JPL
36400	2000 OE_{47}	—	July 31, 2000	Socorro	LINEAR	·	2.9 km	MPC · JPL

== 36401–36500 ==
back to top

Designation			Discovery			Properties		Ref
Permanent	Provisional	Named after	Date	Site	Discoverer(s)	Category	Diam.	Ref
36401	2000 OK_{47}	—	July 31, 2000	Socorro	LINEAR	·	4.6 km	MPC · JPL
36402	2000 OT_{47}	—	July 31, 2000	Socorro	LINEAR	·	3.5 km	MPC · JPL
36403	2000 OW_{47}	—	July 31, 2000	Socorro	LINEAR	·	1.6 km	MPC · JPL
36404	2000 OZ_{47}	—	July 31, 2000	Socorro	LINEAR	·	6.0 km	MPC · JPL
36405	2000 OB_{48}	—	July 31, 2000	Socorro	LINEAR	·	2.6 km	MPC · JPL
36406	2000 OQ_{48}	—	July 31, 2000	Socorro	LINEAR	·	2.0 km	MPC · JPL
36407	2000 OZ_{48}	—	July 31, 2000	Socorro	LINEAR	(5)	3.0 km	MPC · JPL
36408	2000 OB_{49}	—	July 31, 2000	Socorro	LINEAR	NYS	3.1 km	MPC · JPL
36409	2000 OH_{49}	—	July 31, 2000	Socorro	LINEAR	NYS	2.9 km	MPC · JPL
36410	2000 OL_{49}	—	July 31, 2000	Socorro	LINEAR	V	1.9 km	MPC · JPL
36411	2000 OM_{49}	—	July 31, 2000	Socorro	LINEAR	MAR	4.6 km	MPC · JPL
36412	2000 OP_{49}	—	July 31, 2000	Socorro	LINEAR	·	3.0 km	MPC · JPL
36413	2000 OW_{49}	—	July 31, 2000	Socorro	LINEAR	·	4.3 km	MPC · JPL
36414	2000 OE_{50}	—	July 31, 2000	Socorro	LINEAR	·	4.5 km	MPC · JPL
36415	2000 OL_{50}	—	July 31, 2000	Socorro	LINEAR	·	3.8 km	MPC · JPL
36416	2000 OO_{50}	—	July 31, 2000	Socorro	LINEAR	·	7.5 km	MPC · JPL
36417	2000 OQ_{52}	—	July 31, 2000	Socorro	LINEAR	MAS	2.4 km	MPC · JPL
36418	2000 OC_{57}	—	July 29, 2000	Anderson Mesa	LONEOS	·	1.7 km	MPC · JPL
36419	2000 OF_{59}	—	July 29, 2000	Anderson Mesa	LONEOS	·	2.1 km	MPC · JPL
36420	2000 OG_{60}	—	July 29, 2000	Anderson Mesa	LONEOS	NYS ·	4.9 km	MPC · JPL
36421	2000 OM_{60}	—	July 29, 2000	Anderson Mesa	LONEOS	MAS	1.4 km	MPC · JPL
36422	2000 OS_{67}	—	July 23, 2000	Socorro	LINEAR	NYS	2.9 km	MPC · JPL
36423	2000 PJ_{2}	—	August 1, 2000	Socorro	LINEAR	·	2.6 km	MPC · JPL
36424 Satokokumasaki	2000 PZ_{3}	Satokokumasaki	August 3, 2000	Bisei SG Center	BATTeRS	·	2.6 km	MPC · JPL
36425	2000 PM_{5}	—	August 5, 2000	Prescott	P. G. Comba	L5	20 km	MPC · JPL
36426 Kakuda	2000 PJ_{7}	Kakuda	August 5, 2000	Bisei SG Center	BATTeRS	·	2.3 km	MPC · JPL
36427	2000 PR_{7}	—	August 2, 2000	Socorro	LINEAR	·	6.9 km	MPC · JPL
36428	2000 PV_{8}	—	August 9, 2000	Reedy Creek	J. Broughton	·	4.2 km	MPC · JPL
36429	2000 PX_{9}	—	August 1, 2000	Socorro	LINEAR	·	2.8 km	MPC · JPL
36430	2000 PN_{10}	—	August 1, 2000	Socorro	LINEAR	V	1.7 km	MPC · JPL
36431	2000 PJ_{12}	—	August 2, 2000	Socorro	LINEAR	V	2.6 km	MPC · JPL
36432	2000 PQ_{12}	—	August 3, 2000	Socorro	LINEAR	·	3.4 km	MPC · JPL
36433	2000 PR_{17}	—	August 1, 2000	Socorro	LINEAR	·	6.9 km	MPC · JPL
36434	2000 PA_{19}	—	August 1, 2000	Socorro	LINEAR	·	2.2 km	MPC · JPL
36435	2000 PQ_{20}	—	August 1, 2000	Socorro	LINEAR	·	2.8 km	MPC · JPL
36436	2000 PT_{22}	—	August 2, 2000	Socorro	LINEAR	·	1.8 km	MPC · JPL
36437	2000 PW_{23}	—	August 2, 2000	Socorro	LINEAR	·	2.5 km	MPC · JPL
36438	2000 PW_{24}	—	August 3, 2000	Socorro	LINEAR	·	6.6 km	MPC · JPL
36439	2000 PT_{26}	—	August 5, 2000	Haleakala	NEAT	·	4.8 km	MPC · JPL
36440	2000 PD_{27}	—	August 9, 2000	Socorro	LINEAR	·	3.4 km	MPC · JPL
36441	2000 PM_{28}	—	August 4, 2000	Haleakala	NEAT	·	5.2 km	MPC · JPL
36442	2000 PT_{28}	—	August 2, 2000	Socorro	LINEAR	·	1.9 km	MPC · JPL
36443	2000 PA_{29}	—	August 1, 2000	Socorro	LINEAR	·	5.5 km	MPC · JPL
36444 Clairblackburn	2000 PA_{31}	Clairblackburn	August 1, 2000	Cerro Tololo	M. W. Buie	·	2.2 km	MPC · JPL
36445 Smalley	2000 QU	Smalley	August 23, 2000	Olathe	Robinson, L.	·	4.5 km	MPC · JPL
36446 Cinodapistoia	2000 QV	Cinodapistoia	August 22, 2000	San Marcello	L. Tesi, A. Boattini	·	3.3 km	MPC · JPL
36447	2000 QB_{1}	—	August 23, 2000	Gnosca	S. Sposetti	(2076)	3.6 km	MPC · JPL
36448	2000 QE_{2}	—	August 24, 2000	Socorro	LINEAR	H	1.3 km	MPC · JPL
36449	2000 QA_{4}	—	August 24, 2000	Socorro	LINEAR	·	2.8 km	MPC · JPL
36450	2000 QL_{4}	—	August 24, 2000	Socorro	LINEAR	·	2.3 km	MPC · JPL
36451	2000 QQ_{4}	—	August 24, 2000	Socorro	LINEAR	HYG	7.5 km	MPC · JPL
36452	2000 QE_{5}	—	August 24, 2000	Socorro	LINEAR	·	5.9 km	MPC · JPL
36453	2000 QK_{5}	—	August 24, 2000	Socorro	LINEAR	·	1.9 km	MPC · JPL
36454	2000 QN_{5}	—	August 24, 2000	Socorro	LINEAR	·	2.7 km	MPC · JPL
36455	2000 QZ_{6}	—	August 24, 2000	Socorro	LINEAR	PHO	3.7 km	MPC · JPL
36456	2000 QC_{8}	—	August 25, 2000	Višnjan Observatory	K. Korlević, M. Jurić	·	3.2 km	MPC · JPL
36457	2000 QF_{8}	—	August 25, 2000	Višnjan Observatory	K. Korlević, M. Jurić	NYS	3.3 km	MPC · JPL
36458	2000 QO_{8}	—	August 25, 2000	Višnjan Observatory	K. Korlević, M. Jurić	·	2.3 km	MPC · JPL
36459	2000 QU_{8}	—	August 24, 2000	Črni Vrh	Skvarč, J.	V	2.3 km	MPC · JPL
36460	2000 QA_{9}	—	August 25, 2000	Črni Vrh	Mikuž, H.	·	4.1 km	MPC · JPL
36461	2000 QC_{9}	—	August 25, 2000	Črni Vrh	Mikuž, H.	·	6.6 km	MPC · JPL
36462	2000 QV_{11}	—	August 24, 2000	Socorro	LINEAR	·	4.2 km	MPC · JPL
36463	2000 QD_{14}	—	August 24, 2000	Socorro	LINEAR	·	6.1 km	MPC · JPL
36464	2000 QT_{14}	—	August 24, 2000	Socorro	LINEAR	AGN	3.1 km	MPC · JPL
36465	2000 QR_{19}	—	August 24, 2000	Socorro	LINEAR	NYS	4.9 km	MPC · JPL
36466	2000 QR_{22}	—	August 25, 2000	Socorro	LINEAR	MAS	2.1 km	MPC · JPL
36467	2000 QV_{22}	—	August 25, 2000	Socorro	LINEAR	·	1.8 km	MPC · JPL
36468	2000 QA_{23}	—	August 25, 2000	Socorro	LINEAR	·	5.2 km	MPC · JPL
36469	2000 QT_{23}	—	August 25, 2000	Socorro	LINEAR	·	5.0 km	MPC · JPL
36470	2000 QV_{24}	—	August 25, 2000	Socorro	LINEAR	·	4.2 km	MPC · JPL
36471	2000 QK_{26}	—	August 27, 2000	Ondřejov	P. Pravec, P. Kušnirák	·	6.6 km	MPC · JPL
36472 Ebina	2000 QQ_{26}	Ebina	August 27, 2000	Bisei SG Center	BATTeRS	·	2.3 km	MPC · JPL
36473	2000 QB_{27}	—	August 24, 2000	Socorro	LINEAR	NYS ·	4.5 km	MPC · JPL
36474	2000 QN_{28}	—	August 24, 2000	Socorro	LINEAR	·	3.3 km	MPC · JPL
36475	2000 QV_{28}	—	August 24, 2000	Socorro	LINEAR	V	2.1 km	MPC · JPL
36476	2000 QY_{28}	—	August 24, 2000	Socorro	LINEAR	·	5.3 km	MPC · JPL
36477	2000 QC_{29}	—	August 24, 2000	Socorro	LINEAR	THM	6.0 km	MPC · JPL
36478	2000 QQ_{29}	—	August 24, 2000	Socorro	LINEAR	·	6.5 km	MPC · JPL
36479	2000 QX_{29}	—	August 25, 2000	Socorro	LINEAR	·	3.4 km	MPC · JPL
36480	2000 QL_{30}	—	August 25, 2000	Socorro	LINEAR	V	2.0 km	MPC · JPL
36481	2000 QU_{30}	—	August 25, 2000	Socorro	LINEAR	·	3.3 km	MPC · JPL
36482	2000 QR_{31}	—	August 26, 2000	Socorro	LINEAR	·	2.4 km	MPC · JPL
36483	2000 QM_{32}	—	August 26, 2000	Socorro	LINEAR	HYG	6.4 km	MPC · JPL
36484	2000 QD_{37}	—	August 24, 2000	Socorro	LINEAR	·	3.2 km	MPC · JPL
36485	2000 QP_{39}	—	August 24, 2000	Socorro	LINEAR	SUL	6.6 km	MPC · JPL
36486	2000 QW_{40}	—	August 24, 2000	Socorro	LINEAR	·	1.8 km	MPC · JPL
36487	2000 QJ_{42}	—	August 24, 2000	Socorro	LINEAR	·	2.6 km	MPC · JPL
36488	2000 QW_{42}	—	August 24, 2000	Socorro	LINEAR	·	3.8 km	MPC · JPL
36489	2000 QC_{45}	—	August 24, 2000	Socorro	LINEAR	·	7.8 km	MPC · JPL
36490	2000 QJ_{45}	—	August 24, 2000	Socorro	LINEAR	NYS	2.1 km	MPC · JPL
36491	2000 QS_{46}	—	August 24, 2000	Socorro	LINEAR	NYS	3.4 km	MPC · JPL
36492	2000 QW_{46}	—	August 24, 2000	Socorro	LINEAR	(5)	3.4 km	MPC · JPL
36493	2000 QL_{47}	—	August 24, 2000	Socorro	LINEAR	·	6.6 km	MPC · JPL
36494	2000 QM_{47}	—	August 24, 2000	Socorro	LINEAR	·	5.2 km	MPC · JPL
36495	2000 QR_{48}	—	August 24, 2000	Socorro	LINEAR	·	4.7 km	MPC · JPL
36496	2000 QK_{49}	—	August 24, 2000	Socorro	LINEAR	NYS	3.9 km	MPC · JPL
36497	2000 QN_{49}	—	August 24, 2000	Socorro	LINEAR	AGN	3.0 km	MPC · JPL
36498	2000 QW_{53}	—	August 25, 2000	Socorro	LINEAR	·	3.2 km	MPC · JPL
36499	2000 QV_{55}	—	August 25, 2000	Socorro	LINEAR	·	2.2 km	MPC · JPL
36500	2000 QZ_{55}	—	August 25, 2000	Socorro	LINEAR	·	1.8 km	MPC · JPL

== 36501–36600 ==
back to top

Designation			Discovery			Properties		Ref
Permanent	Provisional	Named after	Date	Site	Discoverer(s)	Category	Diam.	Ref
36501	2000 QB_{57}	—	August 26, 2000	Socorro	LINEAR	·	9.6 km	MPC · JPL
36502	2000 QM_{57}	—	August 26, 2000	Socorro	LINEAR	·	1.6 km	MPC · JPL
36503	2000 QV_{60}	—	August 26, 2000	Socorro	LINEAR	·	3.3 km	MPC · JPL
36504	2000 QE_{61}	—	August 26, 2000	Socorro	LINEAR	·	7.4 km	MPC · JPL
36505	2000 QQ_{64}	—	August 28, 2000	Socorro	LINEAR	·	2.4 km	MPC · JPL
36506	2000 QS_{65}	—	August 28, 2000	Socorro	LINEAR	·	3.3 km	MPC · JPL
36507	2000 QW_{66}	—	August 28, 2000	Socorro	LINEAR	NAE	7.0 km	MPC · JPL
36508	2000 QP_{68}	—	August 27, 2000	Višnjan Observatory	K. Korlević	·	2.0 km	MPC · JPL
36509	2000 QD_{69}	—	August 24, 2000	Socorro	LINEAR	·	3.2 km	MPC · JPL
36510	2000 QM_{71}	—	August 24, 2000	Socorro	LINEAR	·	3.3 km	MPC · JPL
36511	2000 QL_{72}	—	August 24, 2000	Socorro	LINEAR	·	4.4 km	MPC · JPL
36512	2000 QS_{72}	—	August 24, 2000	Socorro	LINEAR	·	4.5 km	MPC · JPL
36513	2000 QG_{73}	—	August 24, 2000	Socorro	LINEAR	·	1.4 km	MPC · JPL
36514	2000 QA_{74}	—	August 24, 2000	Socorro	LINEAR	·	5.2 km	MPC · JPL
36515	2000 QJ_{74}	—	August 24, 2000	Socorro	LINEAR	V	2.1 km	MPC · JPL
36516	2000 QV_{74}	—	August 24, 2000	Socorro	LINEAR	·	3.5 km	MPC · JPL
36517	2000 QZ_{74}	—	August 24, 2000	Socorro	LINEAR	KOR	3.0 km	MPC · JPL
36518	2000 QC_{77}	—	August 24, 2000	Socorro	LINEAR	KOR	3.3 km	MPC · JPL
36519	2000 QU_{78}	—	August 24, 2000	Socorro	LINEAR	AGN	3.4 km	MPC · JPL
36520	2000 QV_{78}	—	August 24, 2000	Socorro	LINEAR	·	3.9 km	MPC · JPL
36521	2000 QR_{79}	—	August 24, 2000	Socorro	LINEAR	JUN	4.4 km	MPC · JPL
36522	2000 QZ_{79}	—	August 24, 2000	Socorro	LINEAR	·	2.9 km	MPC · JPL
36523	2000 QO_{80}	—	August 24, 2000	Socorro	LINEAR	·	2.7 km	MPC · JPL
36524	2000 QS_{80}	—	August 24, 2000	Socorro	LINEAR	·	3.8 km	MPC · JPL
36525	2000 QV_{80}	—	August 24, 2000	Socorro	LINEAR	·	1.9 km	MPC · JPL
36526	2000 QD_{81}	—	August 24, 2000	Socorro	LINEAR	·	3.0 km	MPC · JPL
36527	2000 QX_{81}	—	August 24, 2000	Socorro	LINEAR	·	4.3 km	MPC · JPL
36528	2000 QU_{82}	—	August 24, 2000	Socorro	LINEAR	MAS	1.6 km	MPC · JPL
36529	2000 QZ_{82}	—	August 24, 2000	Socorro	LINEAR	·	3.6 km	MPC · JPL
36530	2000 QA_{83}	—	August 24, 2000	Socorro	LINEAR	·	2.8 km	MPC · JPL
36531	2000 QF_{84}	—	August 24, 2000	Socorro	LINEAR	NYS ·	4.3 km	MPC · JPL
36532	2000 QC_{87}	—	August 25, 2000	Socorro	LINEAR	·	3.4 km	MPC · JPL
36533	2000 QF_{87}	—	August 25, 2000	Socorro	LINEAR	·	3.6 km	MPC · JPL
36534	2000 QV_{87}	—	August 25, 2000	Socorro	LINEAR	·	3.7 km	MPC · JPL
36535	2000 QS_{88}	—	August 25, 2000	Socorro	LINEAR	·	2.8 km	MPC · JPL
36536	2000 QO_{89}	—	August 25, 2000	Socorro	LINEAR	·	2.7 km	MPC · JPL
36537	2000 QW_{89}	—	August 25, 2000	Socorro	LINEAR	·	5.5 km	MPC · JPL
36538	2000 QD_{91}	—	August 25, 2000	Socorro	LINEAR	·	5.4 km	MPC · JPL
36539	2000 QZ_{92}	—	August 25, 2000	Socorro	LINEAR	V	2.2 km	MPC · JPL
36540	2000 QB_{93}	—	August 25, 2000	Socorro	LINEAR	THM	8.8 km	MPC · JPL
36541	2000 QJ_{95}	—	August 26, 2000	Socorro	LINEAR	·	1.8 km	MPC · JPL
36542	2000 QZ_{97}	—	August 28, 2000	Socorro	LINEAR	·	7.6 km	MPC · JPL
36543	2000 QD_{98}	—	August 28, 2000	Socorro	LINEAR	·	2.9 km	MPC · JPL
36544	2000 QK_{98}	—	August 28, 2000	Socorro	LINEAR	·	7.3 km	MPC · JPL
36545	2000 QM_{98}	—	August 28, 2000	Socorro	LINEAR	·	3.4 km	MPC · JPL
36546	2000 QN_{98}	—	August 28, 2000	Socorro	LINEAR	·	5.8 km	MPC · JPL
36547	2000 QV_{98}	—	August 28, 2000	Socorro	LINEAR	V	1.7 km	MPC · JPL
36548	2000 QN_{99}	—	August 28, 2000	Socorro	LINEAR	·	5.7 km	MPC · JPL
36549	2000 QP_{99}	—	August 28, 2000	Socorro	LINEAR	·	4.1 km	MPC · JPL
36550	2000 QM_{101}	—	August 28, 2000	Socorro	LINEAR	·	3.4 km	MPC · JPL
36551	2000 QR_{101}	—	August 28, 2000	Socorro	LINEAR	VER	8.8 km	MPC · JPL
36552	2000 QH_{102}	—	August 28, 2000	Socorro	LINEAR	·	2.6 km	MPC · JPL
36553	2000 QL_{102}	—	August 28, 2000	Socorro	LINEAR	·	7.1 km	MPC · JPL
36554	2000 QD_{103}	—	August 28, 2000	Socorro	LINEAR	·	8.4 km	MPC · JPL
36555	2000 QH_{103}	—	August 28, 2000	Socorro	LINEAR	·	2.2 km	MPC · JPL
36556	2000 QW_{104}	—	August 28, 2000	Socorro	LINEAR	·	4.8 km	MPC · JPL
36557	2000 QC_{105}	—	August 28, 2000	Socorro	LINEAR	EOS	4.4 km	MPC · JPL
36558	2000 QP_{105}	—	August 28, 2000	Socorro	LINEAR	·	2.7 km	MPC · JPL
36559	2000 QB_{106}	—	August 28, 2000	Socorro	LINEAR	PHO	3.6 km	MPC · JPL
36560	2000 QP_{107}	—	August 29, 2000	Socorro	LINEAR	(11882)	4.4 km	MPC · JPL
36561	2000 QJ_{109}	—	August 29, 2000	Socorro	LINEAR	·	2.3 km	MPC · JPL
36562	2000 QV_{109}	—	August 26, 2000	Bergisch Gladbach	W. Bickel	·	5.6 km	MPC · JPL
36563	2000 QW_{112}	—	August 24, 2000	Socorro	LINEAR	·	3.3 km	MPC · JPL
36564	2000 QD_{116}	—	August 28, 2000	Socorro	LINEAR	·	4.1 km	MPC · JPL
36565	2000 QG_{118}	—	August 25, 2000	Socorro	LINEAR	·	3.9 km	MPC · JPL
36566	2000 QK_{119}	—	August 25, 2000	Socorro	LINEAR	·	4.1 km	MPC · JPL
36567	2000 QF_{120}	—	August 25, 2000	Socorro	LINEAR	·	2.2 km	MPC · JPL
36568	2000 QO_{120}	—	August 25, 2000	Socorro	LINEAR	·	1.7 km	MPC · JPL
36569	2000 QB_{121}	—	August 25, 2000	Socorro	LINEAR	EUN	3.8 km	MPC · JPL
36570	2000 QC_{121}	—	August 25, 2000	Socorro	LINEAR	·	3.4 km	MPC · JPL
36571	2000 QQ_{121}	—	August 25, 2000	Socorro	LINEAR	·	3.4 km	MPC · JPL
36572	2000 QR_{121}	—	August 25, 2000	Socorro	LINEAR	MAR	6.1 km	MPC · JPL
36573	2000 QJ_{122}	—	August 25, 2000	Socorro	LINEAR	·	2.9 km	MPC · JPL
36574	2000 QA_{123}	—	August 25, 2000	Socorro	LINEAR	·	4.6 km	MPC · JPL
36575	2000 QH_{123}	—	August 25, 2000	Socorro	LINEAR	·	9.1 km	MPC · JPL
36576	2000 QN_{123}	—	August 25, 2000	Socorro	LINEAR	·	3.1 km	MPC · JPL
36577	2000 QX_{123}	—	August 25, 2000	Socorro	LINEAR	·	4.5 km	MPC · JPL
36578	2000 QQ_{124}	—	August 29, 2000	Socorro	LINEAR	·	2.8 km	MPC · JPL
36579	2000 QT_{124}	—	August 29, 2000	Socorro	LINEAR	·	1.7 km	MPC · JPL
36580	2000 QZ_{124}	—	August 29, 2000	Socorro	LINEAR	·	2.6 km	MPC · JPL
36581	2000 QB_{125}	—	August 29, 2000	Socorro	LINEAR	·	2.1 km	MPC · JPL
36582	2000 QM_{126}	—	August 31, 2000	Socorro	LINEAR	·	3.2 km	MPC · JPL
36583	2000 QP_{126}	—	August 31, 2000	Socorro	LINEAR	·	2.0 km	MPC · JPL
36584	2000 QE_{127}	—	August 24, 2000	Socorro	LINEAR	·	7.2 km	MPC · JPL
36585	2000 QJ_{127}	—	August 24, 2000	Socorro	LINEAR	NYS	3.9 km	MPC · JPL
36586	2000 QZ_{127}	—	August 24, 2000	Socorro	LINEAR	·	3.1 km	MPC · JPL
36587	2000 QM_{128}	—	August 24, 2000	Socorro	LINEAR	·	18 km	MPC · JPL
36588	2000 QA_{129}	—	August 26, 2000	Socorro	LINEAR	V	1.6 km	MPC · JPL
36589	2000 QS_{129}	—	August 30, 2000	Višnjan Observatory	K. Korlević	·	7.4 km	MPC · JPL
36590	2000 QG_{132}	—	August 26, 2000	Socorro	LINEAR	KOR	2.7 km	MPC · JPL
36591	2000 QJ_{132}	—	August 26, 2000	Socorro	LINEAR	·	4.6 km	MPC · JPL
36592	2000 QN_{132}	—	August 26, 2000	Socorro	LINEAR	·	8.2 km	MPC · JPL
36593	2000 QR_{133}	—	August 26, 2000	Socorro	LINEAR	·	4.9 km	MPC · JPL
36594	2000 QS_{133}	—	August 26, 2000	Socorro	LINEAR	·	1.6 km	MPC · JPL
36595	2000 QD_{134}	—	August 26, 2000	Socorro	LINEAR	·	4.0 km	MPC · JPL
36596	2000 QH_{134}	—	August 26, 2000	Socorro	LINEAR	fast	4.3 km	MPC · JPL
36597	2000 QB_{136}	—	August 28, 2000	Socorro	LINEAR	MIS	5.2 km	MPC · JPL
36598	2000 QX_{137}	—	August 31, 2000	Socorro	LINEAR	·	7.5 km	MPC · JPL
36599	2000 QB_{138}	—	August 31, 2000	Socorro	LINEAR	V	2.2 km	MPC · JPL
36600	2000 QP_{138}	—	August 31, 2000	Socorro	LINEAR	KOR	3.1 km	MPC · JPL

== 36601–36700 ==
back to top

Designation			Discovery			Properties		Ref
Permanent	Provisional	Named after	Date	Site	Discoverer(s)	Category	Diam.	Ref
36601	2000 QS_{138}	—	August 31, 2000	Socorro	LINEAR	·	5.0 km	MPC · JPL
36602	2000 QS_{139}	—	August 31, 2000	Socorro	LINEAR	·	3.1 km	MPC · JPL
36603	2000 QY_{141}	—	August 31, 2000	Socorro	LINEAR	MAS	2.2 km	MPC · JPL
36604	2000 QP_{142}	—	August 31, 2000	Socorro	LINEAR	·	2.9 km	MPC · JPL
36605	2000 QT_{142}	—	August 31, 2000	Socorro	LINEAR	PAD	4.4 km	MPC · JPL
36606	2000 QL_{143}	—	August 31, 2000	Socorro	LINEAR	·	3.5 km	MPC · JPL
36607	2000 QS_{143}	—	August 31, 2000	Socorro	LINEAR	·	2.5 km	MPC · JPL
36608	2000 QY_{143}	—	August 31, 2000	Socorro	LINEAR	MAS	2.8 km	MPC · JPL
36609	2000 QD_{144}	—	August 31, 2000	Socorro	LINEAR	KOR	3.3 km	MPC · JPL
36610	2000 QR_{144}	—	August 31, 2000	Socorro	LINEAR	(7744)	2.7 km	MPC · JPL
36611	2000 QF_{145}	—	August 31, 2000	Socorro	LINEAR	·	3.4 km	MPC · JPL
36612	2000 QQ_{145}	—	August 31, 2000	Socorro	LINEAR	·	4.8 km	MPC · JPL
36613	2000 QW_{145}	—	August 31, 2000	Socorro	LINEAR	·	4.6 km	MPC · JPL
36614 Saltis	2000 QU_{148}	Saltis	August 27, 2000	Stockholm	A. Brandeker	·	2.0 km	MPC · JPL
36615	2000 QL_{149}	—	August 24, 2000	Socorro	LINEAR	NYS	4.2 km	MPC · JPL
36616	2000 QZ_{149}	—	August 25, 2000	Socorro	LINEAR	·	2.4 km	MPC · JPL
36617	2000 QJ_{150}	—	August 25, 2000	Socorro	LINEAR	·	7.1 km	MPC · JPL
36618	2000 QB_{151}	—	August 25, 2000	Socorro	LINEAR	V	2.3 km	MPC · JPL
36619	2000 QE_{151}	—	August 25, 2000	Socorro	LINEAR	·	4.6 km	MPC · JPL
36620	2000 QM_{151}	—	August 25, 2000	Socorro	LINEAR	·	6.9 km	MPC · JPL
36621	2000 QN_{151}	—	August 25, 2000	Socorro	LINEAR	·	4.2 km	MPC · JPL
36622	2000 QE_{152}	—	August 28, 2000	Socorro	LINEAR	·	4.5 km	MPC · JPL
36623	2000 QS_{155}	—	August 31, 2000	Socorro	LINEAR	·	6.2 km	MPC · JPL
36624 Ablerus	2000 QA_{157}	Ablerus	August 31, 2000	Socorro	LINEAR	L5	32 km	MPC · JPL
36625	2000 QT_{158}	—	August 31, 2000	Socorro	LINEAR	slow	6.6 km	MPC · JPL
36626	2000 QN_{160}	—	August 31, 2000	Socorro	LINEAR	·	2.0 km	MPC · JPL
36627	2000 QM_{165}	—	August 31, 2000	Socorro	LINEAR	(5)	3.7 km	MPC · JPL
36628	2000 QV_{165}	—	August 31, 2000	Socorro	LINEAR	·	3.9 km	MPC · JPL
36629	2000 QJ_{168}	—	August 31, 2000	Socorro	LINEAR	·	2.1 km	MPC · JPL
36630	2000 QU_{170}	—	August 31, 2000	Socorro	LINEAR	·	2.4 km	MPC · JPL
36631	2000 QZ_{170}	—	August 31, 2000	Socorro	LINEAR	·	3.4 km	MPC · JPL
36632	2000 QB_{171}	—	August 31, 2000	Socorro	LINEAR	(1338) (FLO)	2.1 km	MPC · JPL
36633	2000 QG_{171}	—	August 31, 2000	Socorro	LINEAR	(5)	3.6 km	MPC · JPL
36634	2000 QP_{173}	—	August 31, 2000	Socorro	LINEAR	·	3.7 km	MPC · JPL
36635	2000 QX_{173}	—	August 31, 2000	Socorro	LINEAR	·	2.1 km	MPC · JPL
36636	2000 QP_{176}	—	August 31, 2000	Socorro	LINEAR	·	1.8 km	MPC · JPL
36637	2000 QB_{179}	—	August 31, 2000	Socorro	LINEAR	·	6.9 km	MPC · JPL
36638	2000 QO_{179}	—	August 31, 2000	Socorro	LINEAR	·	3.9 km	MPC · JPL
36639	2000 QC_{183}	—	August 31, 2000	Socorro	LINEAR	·	2.1 km	MPC · JPL
36640	2000 QR_{184}	—	August 26, 2000	Socorro	LINEAR	·	2.3 km	MPC · JPL
36641	2000 QY_{185}	—	August 26, 2000	Socorro	LINEAR	·	7.6 km	MPC · JPL
36642	2000 QU_{186}	—	August 26, 2000	Socorro	LINEAR	·	2.2 km	MPC · JPL
36643	2000 QW_{188}	—	August 26, 2000	Socorro	LINEAR	·	1.9 km	MPC · JPL
36644	2000 QR_{189}	—	August 26, 2000	Socorro	LINEAR	·	2.0 km	MPC · JPL
36645	2000 QV_{189}	—	August 26, 2000	Socorro	LINEAR	slow	4.1 km	MPC · JPL
36646	2000 QZ_{191}	—	August 26, 2000	Socorro	LINEAR	·	12 km	MPC · JPL
36647	2000 QD_{192}	—	August 26, 2000	Socorro	LINEAR	EOS	5.0 km	MPC · JPL
36648	2000 QM_{195}	—	August 26, 2000	Socorro	LINEAR	·	4.2 km	MPC · JPL
36649	2000 QR_{195}	—	August 26, 2000	Socorro	LINEAR	·	4.9 km	MPC · JPL
36650	2000 QJ_{198}	—	August 29, 2000	Socorro	LINEAR	·	2.3 km	MPC · JPL
36651	2000 QR_{198}	—	August 29, 2000	Socorro	LINEAR	·	1.7 km	MPC · JPL
36652	2000 QY_{198}	—	August 29, 2000	Socorro	LINEAR	·	2.3 km	MPC · JPL
36653	2000 QF_{200}	—	August 29, 2000	Socorro	LINEAR	·	4.4 km	MPC · JPL
36654	2000 QD_{202}	—	August 29, 2000	Socorro	LINEAR	·	2.9 km	MPC · JPL
36655	2000 QL_{202}	—	August 29, 2000	Socorro	LINEAR	·	3.9 km	MPC · JPL
36656	2000 QS_{202}	—	August 29, 2000	Socorro	LINEAR	·	8.0 km	MPC · JPL
36657	2000 QY_{202}	—	August 29, 2000	Socorro	LINEAR	·	3.1 km	MPC · JPL
36658	2000 QG_{204}	—	August 29, 2000	Socorro	LINEAR	(7744)	3.6 km	MPC · JPL
36659	2000 QB_{205}	—	August 31, 2000	Socorro	LINEAR	·	4.9 km	MPC · JPL
36660	2000 QF_{206}	—	August 31, 2000	Socorro	LINEAR	THM	6.4 km	MPC · JPL
36661	2000 QB_{208}	—	August 31, 2000	Socorro	LINEAR	·	3.9 km	MPC · JPL
36662	2000 QT_{208}	—	August 31, 2000	Socorro	LINEAR	·	5.6 km	MPC · JPL
36663	2000 QY_{210}	—	August 31, 2000	Socorro	LINEAR	·	5.1 km	MPC · JPL
36664	2000 QN_{211}	—	August 31, 2000	Socorro	LINEAR	·	3.7 km	MPC · JPL
36665	2000 QO_{211}	—	August 31, 2000	Socorro	LINEAR	·	2.2 km	MPC · JPL
36666	2000 QA_{212}	—	August 31, 2000	Socorro	LINEAR	·	4.2 km	MPC · JPL
36667	2000 QX_{212}	—	August 31, 2000	Socorro	LINEAR	MAS	1.9 km	MPC · JPL
36668	2000 QC_{216}	—	August 31, 2000	Socorro	LINEAR	GEF	3.3 km	MPC · JPL
36669	2000 QH_{217}	—	August 31, 2000	Socorro	LINEAR	·	9.9 km	MPC · JPL
36670	2000 QM_{217}	—	August 31, 2000	Socorro	LINEAR	·	4.7 km	MPC · JPL
36671	2000 QR_{217}	—	August 31, 2000	Socorro	LINEAR	·	4.4 km	MPC · JPL
36672 Sidi	2000 QR_{220}	Sidi	August 21, 2000	Anderson Mesa	LONEOS	·	3.9 km	MPC · JPL
36673	2000 QG_{221}	—	August 21, 2000	Anderson Mesa	LONEOS	·	6.7 km	MPC · JPL
36674	2000 QA_{222}	—	August 21, 2000	Anderson Mesa	LONEOS	·	1.9 km	MPC · JPL
36675	2000 QE_{222}	—	August 21, 2000	Anderson Mesa	LONEOS	GEF	3.4 km	MPC · JPL
36676	2000 QG_{222}	—	August 21, 2000	Anderson Mesa	LONEOS	·	6.8 km	MPC · JPL
36677	2000 QO_{224}	—	August 26, 2000	Kitt Peak	Spacewatch	·	4.2 km	MPC · JPL
36678	2000 QJ_{228}	—	August 31, 2000	Socorro	LINEAR	·	1.8 km	MPC · JPL
36679	2000 QH_{231}	—	August 29, 2000	Socorro	LINEAR	·	4.6 km	MPC · JPL
36680	2000 RK_{1}	—	September 1, 2000	Socorro	LINEAR	·	2.0 km	MPC · JPL
36681	2000 RQ_{1}	—	September 1, 2000	Socorro	LINEAR	PHO	5.7 km	MPC · JPL
36682	2000 RZ_{1}	—	September 1, 2000	Socorro	LINEAR	·	7.7 km	MPC · JPL
36683	2000 RG_{2}	—	September 1, 2000	Socorro	LINEAR	(5)	2.1 km	MPC · JPL
36684	2000 RJ_{2}	—	September 1, 2000	Socorro	LINEAR	·	2.2 km	MPC · JPL
36685	2000 RC_{3}	—	September 1, 2000	Socorro	LINEAR	·	4.2 km	MPC · JPL
36686	2000 RH_{4}	—	September 1, 2000	Socorro	LINEAR	·	4.6 km	MPC · JPL
36687	2000 RR_{4}	—	September 1, 2000	Socorro	LINEAR	·	2.5 km	MPC · JPL
36688	2000 RU_{4}	—	September 1, 2000	Socorro	LINEAR	·	3.8 km	MPC · JPL
36689	2000 RM_{5}	—	September 1, 2000	Socorro	LINEAR	·	4.2 km	MPC · JPL
36690	2000 RD_{7}	—	September 1, 2000	Socorro	LINEAR	·	6.9 km	MPC · JPL
36691	2000 RH_{7}	—	September 1, 2000	Socorro	LINEAR	·	2.9 km	MPC · JPL
36692	2000 RH_{10}	—	September 1, 2000	Socorro	LINEAR	·	3.8 km	MPC · JPL
36693	2000 RT_{14}	—	September 1, 2000	Socorro	LINEAR	GEF	2.7 km	MPC · JPL
36694	2000 RT_{15}	—	September 1, 2000	Socorro	LINEAR	EOS	5.7 km	MPC · JPL
36695	2000 RB_{16}	—	September 1, 2000	Socorro	LINEAR	slow	2.4 km	MPC · JPL
36696	2000 RX_{16}	—	September 1, 2000	Socorro	LINEAR	V	2.5 km	MPC · JPL
36697	2000 RC_{17}	—	September 1, 2000	Socorro	LINEAR	·	7.3 km	MPC · JPL
36698	2000 RN_{17}	—	September 1, 2000	Socorro	LINEAR	V	1.6 km	MPC · JPL
36699	2000 RQ_{17}	—	September 1, 2000	Socorro	LINEAR	·	5.4 km	MPC · JPL
36700	2000 RT_{17}	—	September 1, 2000	Socorro	LINEAR	·	3.0 km	MPC · JPL

== 36701–36800 ==
back to top

Designation			Discovery			Properties		Ref
Permanent	Provisional	Named after	Date	Site	Discoverer(s)	Category	Diam.	Ref
36701	2000 RY_{17}	—	September 1, 2000	Socorro	LINEAR	·	4.8 km	MPC · JPL
36702	2000 RC_{18}	—	September 1, 2000	Socorro	LINEAR	·	3.2 km	MPC · JPL
36703	2000 RO_{23}	—	September 1, 2000	Socorro	LINEAR	·	5.0 km	MPC · JPL
36704	2000 RQ_{23}	—	September 1, 2000	Socorro	LINEAR	·	2.9 km	MPC · JPL
36705	2000 RE_{25}	—	September 1, 2000	Socorro	LINEAR	EUN	4.4 km	MPC · JPL
36706	2000 RK_{29}	—	September 1, 2000	Socorro	LINEAR	·	4.3 km	MPC · JPL
36707	2000 RP_{29}	—	September 1, 2000	Socorro	LINEAR	slow	7.8 km	MPC · JPL
36708	2000 RG_{30}	—	September 1, 2000	Socorro	LINEAR	V	2.3 km	MPC · JPL
36709	2000 RO_{30}	—	September 1, 2000	Socorro	LINEAR	GEF	3.6 km	MPC · JPL
36710	2000 RR_{31}	—	September 1, 2000	Socorro	LINEAR	·	3.5 km	MPC · JPL
36711	2000 RF_{33}	—	September 1, 2000	Socorro	LINEAR	·	2.3 km	MPC · JPL
36712	2000 RS_{33}	—	September 1, 2000	Socorro	LINEAR	V	2.7 km	MPC · JPL
36713	2000 RV_{33}	—	September 1, 2000	Socorro	LINEAR	slow	6.3 km	MPC · JPL
36714	2000 RK_{35}	—	September 1, 2000	Socorro	LINEAR	·	4.6 km	MPC · JPL
36715	2000 RG_{39}	—	September 6, 2000	Elmira	Cecce, A. J.	·	2.4 km	MPC · JPL
36716	2000 RU_{39}	—	September 2, 2000	Socorro	LINEAR	EUN	2.6 km	MPC · JPL
36717	2000 RY_{40}	—	September 3, 2000	Socorro	LINEAR	·	3.0 km	MPC · JPL
36718	2000 RK_{41}	—	September 3, 2000	Socorro	LINEAR	·	12 km	MPC · JPL
36719	2000 RC_{42}	—	September 3, 2000	Socorro	LINEAR	MAR	4.7 km	MPC · JPL
36720	2000 RE_{42}	—	September 3, 2000	Socorro	LINEAR	·	3.5 km	MPC · JPL
36721	2000 RK_{42}	—	September 3, 2000	Socorro	LINEAR	·	9.3 km	MPC · JPL
36722	2000 RZ_{42}	—	September 3, 2000	Socorro	LINEAR	·	3.2 km	MPC · JPL
36723	2000 RE_{43}	—	September 3, 2000	Socorro	LINEAR	V	1.9 km	MPC · JPL
36724	2000 RS_{43}	—	September 3, 2000	Socorro	LINEAR	·	12 km	MPC · JPL
36725	2000 RB_{45}	—	September 3, 2000	Socorro	LINEAR	EUN	4.3 km	MPC · JPL
36726	2000 RS_{46}	—	September 3, 2000	Socorro	LINEAR	·	9.9 km	MPC · JPL
36727	2000 RV_{46}	—	September 3, 2000	Socorro	LINEAR	EUN	3.7 km	MPC · JPL
36728	2000 RD_{47}	—	September 3, 2000	Socorro	LINEAR	·	8.3 km	MPC · JPL
36729	2000 RV_{47}	—	September 3, 2000	Socorro	LINEAR	ADE	3.2 km	MPC · JPL
36730	2000 RV_{48}	—	September 3, 2000	Socorro	LINEAR	·	10 km	MPC · JPL
36731	2000 RR_{50}	—	September 5, 2000	Socorro	LINEAR	·	4.8 km	MPC · JPL
36732	2000 RS_{50}	—	September 5, 2000	Socorro	LINEAR	NYS	2.2 km	MPC · JPL
36733	2000 RY_{51}	—	September 5, 2000	Socorro	LINEAR	·	8.0 km	MPC · JPL
36734	2000 RZ_{54}	—	September 3, 2000	Socorro	LINEAR	·	3.6 km	MPC · JPL
36735	2000 RF_{55}	—	September 3, 2000	Socorro	LINEAR	·	18 km	MPC · JPL
36736	2000 RX_{58}	—	September 7, 2000	Kitt Peak	Spacewatch	·	5.1 km	MPC · JPL
36737	2000 RP_{60}	—	September 3, 2000	Socorro	LINEAR	·	4.2 km	MPC · JPL
36738	2000 RC_{61}	—	September 1, 2000	Socorro	LINEAR	·	4.5 km	MPC · JPL
36739	2000 RG_{61}	—	September 1, 2000	Socorro	LINEAR	·	8.0 km	MPC · JPL
36740	2000 RQ_{61}	—	September 1, 2000	Socorro	LINEAR	·	3.2 km	MPC · JPL
36741	2000 RL_{62}	—	September 1, 2000	Socorro	LINEAR	·	14 km	MPC · JPL
36742	2000 RM_{62}	—	September 1, 2000	Socorro	LINEAR	THM	7.9 km	MPC · JPL
36743	2000 RO_{62}	—	September 1, 2000	Socorro	LINEAR	·	6.4 km	MPC · JPL
36744	2000 RB_{63}	—	September 2, 2000	Socorro	LINEAR	·	2.2 km	MPC · JPL
36745	2000 RC_{64}	—	September 3, 2000	Socorro	LINEAR	RAF	3.6 km	MPC · JPL
36746	2000 RX_{64}	—	September 1, 2000	Socorro	LINEAR	·	1.7 km	MPC · JPL
36747	2000 RK_{65}	—	September 1, 2000	Socorro	LINEAR	·	2.6 km	MPC · JPL
36748	2000 RR_{65}	—	September 1, 2000	Socorro	LINEAR	·	7.0 km	MPC · JPL
36749	2000 RW_{65}	—	September 1, 2000	Socorro	LINEAR	·	3.0 km	MPC · JPL
36750	2000 RR_{68}	—	September 2, 2000	Socorro	LINEAR	·	4.6 km	MPC · JPL
36751	2000 RE_{69}	—	September 2, 2000	Socorro	LINEAR	·	1.8 km	MPC · JPL
36752	2000 RZ_{69}	—	September 2, 2000	Socorro	LINEAR	·	5.4 km	MPC · JPL
36753	2000 RH_{70}	—	September 2, 2000	Socorro	LINEAR	·	3.3 km	MPC · JPL
36754	2000 RL_{70}	—	September 2, 2000	Socorro	LINEAR	·	5.8 km	MPC · JPL
36755	2000 RT_{70}	—	September 2, 2000	Socorro	LINEAR	·	4.1 km	MPC · JPL
36756	2000 RG_{71}	—	September 2, 2000	Socorro	LINEAR	·	2.5 km	MPC · JPL
36757	2000 RY_{71}	—	September 2, 2000	Socorro	LINEAR	V	3.2 km	MPC · JPL
36758	2000 RG_{73}	—	September 2, 2000	Socorro	LINEAR	·	3.0 km	MPC · JPL
36759	2000 RO_{75}	—	September 3, 2000	Socorro	LINEAR	·	5.9 km	MPC · JPL
36760	2000 RS_{76}	—	September 4, 2000	Socorro	LINEAR	KOR	5.1 km	MPC · JPL
36761	2000 RW_{76}	—	September 4, 2000	Socorro	LINEAR	V	3.4 km	MPC · JPL
36762	2000 RU_{78}	—	September 10, 2000	Višnjan Observatory	K. Korlević	·	6.4 km	MPC · JPL
36763	2000 RJ_{82}	—	September 1, 2000	Socorro	LINEAR	·	3.0 km	MPC · JPL
36764	2000 RH_{83}	—	September 1, 2000	Socorro	LINEAR	NYS ·	5.8 km	MPC · JPL
36765	2000 RE_{86}	—	September 2, 2000	Socorro	LINEAR	PAD	4.5 km	MPC · JPL
36766	2000 RN_{91}	—	September 3, 2000	Socorro	LINEAR	·	2.4 km	MPC · JPL
36767	2000 RG_{92}	—	September 3, 2000	Socorro	LINEAR	·	2.1 km	MPC · JPL
36768	2000 RA_{93}	—	September 3, 2000	Socorro	LINEAR	·	5.3 km	MPC · JPL
36769	2000 RT_{94}	—	September 4, 2000	Anderson Mesa	LONEOS	·	3.8 km	MPC · JPL
36770	2000 RU_{94}	—	September 4, 2000	Anderson Mesa	LONEOS	·	3.6 km	MPC · JPL
36771	2000 RD_{97}	—	September 5, 2000	Anderson Mesa	LONEOS	H	5.6 km	MPC · JPL
36772	2000 RF_{99}	—	September 5, 2000	Anderson Mesa	LONEOS	·	19 km	MPC · JPL
36773 Tuttlekeane	2000 RQ_{99}	Tuttlekeane	September 5, 2000	Anderson Mesa	LONEOS	(18466)	5.4 km	MPC · JPL
36774 Kuittinen	2000 RK_{101}	Kuittinen	September 5, 2000	Anderson Mesa	LONEOS	·	6.9 km	MPC · JPL
36775	2000 RQ_{101}	—	September 5, 2000	Anderson Mesa	LONEOS	·	12 km	MPC · JPL
36776	2000 RV_{102}	—	September 5, 2000	Anderson Mesa	LONEOS	·	8.4 km	MPC · JPL
36777	2000 RP_{104}	—	September 6, 2000	Socorro	LINEAR	EUN	4.5 km	MPC · JPL
36778	2000 SU_{1}	—	September 19, 2000	Kvistaberg	Uppsala-DLR Asteroid Survey	fast	7.1 km	MPC · JPL
36779	2000 SW_{1}	—	September 20, 2000	Socorro	LINEAR	slow	2.1 km	MPC · JPL
36780	2000 SL_{2}	—	September 20, 2000	Socorro	LINEAR	·	12 km	MPC · JPL
36781	2000 SM_{2}	—	September 30, 2000	Socorro	LINEAR	·	1.9 km	MPC · JPL
36782 Okauchitakashige	2000 SR_{4}	Okauchitakashige	September 20, 2000	Bisei SG Center	BATTeRS	·	7.4 km	MPC · JPL
36783 Kagamino	2000 SD_{7}	Kagamino	September 23, 2000	Bisei SG Center	BATTeRS	·	4.2 km	MPC · JPL
36784	2000 SU_{11}	—	September 20, 2000	Socorro	LINEAR	NYS	2.8 km	MPC · JPL
36785	2000 SN_{12}	—	September 20, 2000	Socorro	LINEAR	HYG	7.9 km	MPC · JPL
36786	2000 SN_{14}	—	September 23, 2000	Socorro	LINEAR	EUN	3.9 km	MPC · JPL
36787	2000 ST_{16}	—	September 23, 2000	Socorro	LINEAR	·	1.9 km	MPC · JPL
36788	2000 SK_{18}	—	September 23, 2000	Socorro	LINEAR	·	4.4 km	MPC · JPL
36789	2000 SR_{19}	—	September 23, 2000	Socorro	LINEAR	·	4.0 km	MPC · JPL
36790	2000 SJ_{20}	—	September 23, 2000	Socorro	LINEAR	·	7.1 km	MPC · JPL
36791	2000 SQ_{22}	—	September 20, 2000	Haleakala	NEAT	·	3.9 km	MPC · JPL
36792	2000 SC_{23}	—	September 25, 2000	Višnjan Observatory	K. Korlević	MAR	4.4 km	MPC · JPL
36793	2000 SZ_{29}	—	September 24, 2000	Socorro	LINEAR	·	1.9 km	MPC · JPL
36794	2000 SA_{32}	—	September 24, 2000	Socorro	LINEAR	·	4.6 km	MPC · JPL
36795	2000 SM_{37}	—	September 24, 2000	Socorro	LINEAR	·	1.6 km	MPC · JPL
36796	2000 SU_{41}	—	September 24, 2000	Socorro	LINEAR	·	6.0 km	MPC · JPL
36797	2000 SK_{42}	—	September 25, 2000	Višnjan Observatory	K. Korlević	THM	8.4 km	MPC · JPL
36798	2000 SA_{43}	—	September 25, 2000	Črni Vrh	Mikuž, H.	·	1.6 km	MPC · JPL
36799	2000 SG_{43}	—	September 26, 2000	Črni Vrh	Mikuž, H.	·	1.9 km	MPC · JPL
36800 Katarinawitt	2000 SF_{45}	Katarinawitt	September 28, 2000	Drebach	J. Kandler	·	2.5 km	MPC · JPL

== 36801–36900 ==
back to top

Designation			Discovery			Properties		Ref
Permanent	Provisional	Named after	Date	Site	Discoverer(s)	Category	Diam.	Ref
36801	2000 SZ_{49}	—	September 23, 2000	Socorro	LINEAR	·	4.2 km	MPC · JPL
36802	2000 SJ_{54}	—	September 24, 2000	Socorro	LINEAR	·	4.1 km	MPC · JPL
36803	2000 ST_{54}	—	September 24, 2000	Socorro	LINEAR	·	3.6 km	MPC · JPL
36804	2000 SX_{61}	—	September 24, 2000	Socorro	LINEAR	·	3.1 km	MPC · JPL
36805	2000 SW_{62}	—	September 24, 2000	Socorro	LINEAR	·	3.5 km	MPC · JPL
36806	2000 SD_{63}	—	September 24, 2000	Socorro	LINEAR	·	3.1 km	MPC · JPL
36807	2000 SM_{67}	—	September 24, 2000	Socorro	LINEAR	·	2.5 km	MPC · JPL
36808	2000 SA_{68}	—	September 24, 2000	Socorro	LINEAR	·	1.7 km	MPC · JPL
36809	2000 SZ_{68}	—	September 24, 2000	Socorro	LINEAR	·	2.9 km	MPC · JPL
36810	2000 SN_{69}	—	September 24, 2000	Socorro	LINEAR	·	2.8 km	MPC · JPL
36811	2000 SA_{70}	—	September 24, 2000	Socorro	LINEAR	V	1.8 km	MPC · JPL
36812	2000 SN_{70}	—	September 24, 2000	Socorro	LINEAR	·	2.2 km	MPC · JPL
36813	2000 SS_{70}	—	September 24, 2000	Socorro	LINEAR	·	8.7 km	MPC · JPL
36814	2000 SX_{71}	—	September 24, 2000	Socorro	LINEAR	·	7.3 km	MPC · JPL
36815	2000 SX_{74}	—	September 24, 2000	Socorro	LINEAR	·	4.4 km	MPC · JPL
36816	2000 SD_{75}	—	September 24, 2000	Socorro	LINEAR	·	5.2 km	MPC · JPL
36817	2000 SL_{76}	—	September 24, 2000	Socorro	LINEAR	V	2.4 km	MPC · JPL
36818	2000 SG_{79}	—	September 24, 2000	Socorro	LINEAR	THM	4.8 km	MPC · JPL
36819	2000 SO_{80}	—	September 24, 2000	Socorro	LINEAR	·	6.1 km	MPC · JPL
36820	2000 SK_{82}	—	September 24, 2000	Socorro	LINEAR	·	5.2 km	MPC · JPL
36821	2000 SY_{84}	—	September 24, 2000	Socorro	LINEAR	·	6.3 km	MPC · JPL
36822	2000 SH_{86}	—	September 24, 2000	Socorro	LINEAR	·	3.1 km	MPC · JPL
36823	2000 SM_{86}	—	September 24, 2000	Socorro	LINEAR	·	3.4 km	MPC · JPL
36824	2000 SQ_{86}	—	September 24, 2000	Socorro	LINEAR	·	7.6 km	MPC · JPL
36825	2000 SL_{87}	—	September 24, 2000	Socorro	LINEAR	·	2.8 km	MPC · JPL
36826	2000 SS_{88}	—	September 24, 2000	Socorro	LINEAR	·	6.8 km	MPC · JPL
36827	2000 SP_{89}	—	September 22, 2000	Elmira	Cecce, A. J.	·	11 km	MPC · JPL
36828	2000 ST_{94}	—	September 23, 2000	Socorro	LINEAR	·	7.4 km	MPC · JPL
36829	2000 SQ_{99}	—	September 23, 2000	Socorro	LINEAR	·	6.1 km	MPC · JPL
36830	2000 SW_{100}	—	September 23, 2000	Socorro	LINEAR	·	12 km	MPC · JPL
36831	2000 SD_{101}	—	September 23, 2000	Socorro	LINEAR	EUN	3.4 km	MPC · JPL
36832	2000 SA_{102}	—	September 24, 2000	Socorro	LINEAR	·	6.1 km	MPC · JPL
36833	2000 SY_{103}	—	September 24, 2000	Socorro	LINEAR	·	7.6 km	MPC · JPL
36834	2000 SA_{106}	—	September 24, 2000	Socorro	LINEAR	·	2.7 km	MPC · JPL
36835	2000 SF_{109}	—	September 24, 2000	Socorro	LINEAR	·	4.2 km	MPC · JPL
36836	2000 SN_{109}	—	September 24, 2000	Socorro	LINEAR	·	2.7 km	MPC · JPL
36837	2000 SD_{110}	—	September 24, 2000	Socorro	LINEAR	KOR	3.6 km	MPC · JPL
36838	2000 SK_{110}	—	September 24, 2000	Socorro	LINEAR	KOR	3.5 km	MPC · JPL
36839	2000 SV_{110}	—	September 24, 2000	Socorro	LINEAR	·	3.0 km	MPC · JPL
36840	2000 SH_{112}	—	September 24, 2000	Socorro	LINEAR	·	2.6 km	MPC · JPL
36841	2000 SM_{113}	—	September 24, 2000	Socorro	LINEAR	THM	6.3 km	MPC · JPL
36842	2000 SJ_{114}	—	September 24, 2000	Socorro	LINEAR	·	3.7 km	MPC · JPL
36843	2000 SW_{116}	—	September 24, 2000	Socorro	LINEAR	·	3.8 km	MPC · JPL
36844	2000 SG_{117}	—	September 24, 2000	Socorro	LINEAR	·	6.7 km	MPC · JPL
36845	2000 SX_{119}	—	September 24, 2000	Socorro	LINEAR	·	7.8 km	MPC · JPL
36846	2000 SC_{121}	—	September 24, 2000	Socorro	LINEAR	MRX	3.8 km	MPC · JPL
36847	2000 SD_{121}	—	September 24, 2000	Socorro	LINEAR	·	3.8 km	MPC · JPL
36848	2000 SV_{121}	—	September 24, 2000	Socorro	LINEAR	·	5.6 km	MPC · JPL
36849	2000 SL_{122}	—	September 24, 2000	Socorro	LINEAR	·	4.9 km	MPC · JPL
36850	2000 SZ_{122}	—	September 24, 2000	Socorro	LINEAR	KOR	3.8 km	MPC · JPL
36851	2000 SS_{123}	—	September 24, 2000	Socorro	LINEAR	·	3.1 km	MPC · JPL
36852	2000 SA_{124}	—	September 24, 2000	Socorro	LINEAR	·	8.2 km	MPC · JPL
36853	2000 SU_{124}	—	September 24, 2000	Socorro	LINEAR	·	2.9 km	MPC · JPL
36854	2000 SA_{125}	—	September 24, 2000	Socorro	LINEAR	PAD	6.7 km	MPC · JPL
36855	2000 SB_{125}	—	September 24, 2000	Socorro	LINEAR	·	3.1 km	MPC · JPL
36856	2000 SP_{125}	—	September 24, 2000	Socorro	LINEAR	·	3.6 km	MPC · JPL
36857	2000 SL_{126}	—	September 24, 2000	Socorro	LINEAR	ERI	5.3 km	MPC · JPL
36858	2000 SO_{127}	—	September 24, 2000	Socorro	LINEAR	·	2.2 km	MPC · JPL
36859	2000 SC_{136}	—	September 23, 2000	Socorro	LINEAR	·	7.4 km	MPC · JPL
36860	2000 SP_{136}	—	September 23, 2000	Socorro	LINEAR	·	3.1 km	MPC · JPL
36861	2000 SG_{137}	—	September 23, 2000	Socorro	LINEAR	·	9.2 km	MPC · JPL
36862	2000 SH_{140}	—	September 23, 2000	Socorro	LINEAR	·	4.7 km	MPC · JPL
36863	2000 SW_{142}	—	September 23, 2000	Socorro	LINEAR	GEF	3.4 km	MPC · JPL
36864	2000 SO_{144}	—	September 24, 2000	Socorro	LINEAR	·	3.5 km	MPC · JPL
36865	2000 SQ_{146}	—	September 24, 2000	Socorro	LINEAR	·	2.4 km	MPC · JPL
36866	2000 SG_{147}	—	September 24, 2000	Socorro	LINEAR	·	2.3 km	MPC · JPL
36867	2000 SA_{149}	—	September 24, 2000	Socorro	LINEAR	THM	5.4 km	MPC · JPL
36868	2000 SP_{150}	—	September 24, 2000	Socorro	LINEAR	NYS ·	4.9 km	MPC · JPL
36869	2000 ST_{150}	—	September 24, 2000	Socorro	LINEAR	·	2.3 km	MPC · JPL
36870	2000 SU_{150}	—	September 24, 2000	Socorro	LINEAR	·	5.9 km	MPC · JPL
36871	2000 SV_{150}	—	September 24, 2000	Socorro	LINEAR	·	2.9 km	MPC · JPL
36872	2000 SB_{151}	—	September 24, 2000	Socorro	LINEAR	·	2.1 km	MPC · JPL
36873	2000 SD_{151}	—	September 24, 2000	Socorro	LINEAR	KOR	3.4 km	MPC · JPL
36874	2000 SF_{151}	—	September 24, 2000	Socorro	LINEAR	·	4.5 km	MPC · JPL
36875	2000 SS_{151}	—	September 24, 2000	Socorro	LINEAR	·	3.7 km	MPC · JPL
36876	2000 SS_{152}	—	September 24, 2000	Socorro	LINEAR	THM	9.1 km	MPC · JPL
36877	2000 SX_{152}	—	September 24, 2000	Socorro	LINEAR	·	3.3 km	MPC · JPL
36878	2000 SV_{153}	—	September 24, 2000	Socorro	LINEAR	HYG	11 km	MPC · JPL
36879	2000 SM_{154}	—	September 24, 2000	Socorro	LINEAR	·	7.6 km	MPC · JPL
36880	2000 SP_{154}	—	September 24, 2000	Socorro	LINEAR	·	5.8 km	MPC · JPL
36881	2000 SX_{154}	—	September 24, 2000	Socorro	LINEAR	·	3.7 km	MPC · JPL
36882	2000 SW_{155}	—	September 24, 2000	Socorro	LINEAR	·	9.3 km	MPC · JPL
36883	2000 SN_{156}	—	September 24, 2000	Socorro	LINEAR	·	4.6 km	MPC · JPL
36884	2000 SN_{158}	—	September 27, 2000	Socorro	LINEAR	KOR	3.6 km	MPC · JPL
36885	2000 SO_{159}	—	September 27, 2000	Kitt Peak	Spacewatch	·	2.9 km	MPC · JPL
36886	2000 SV_{161}	—	September 20, 2000	Haleakala	NEAT	EOS	5.8 km	MPC · JPL
36887	2000 SA_{162}	—	September 20, 2000	Haleakala	NEAT	·	5.0 km	MPC · JPL
36888 Škrabal	2000 SE_{163}	Škrabal	September 29, 2000	Ondřejov	P. Kušnirák, P. Pravec	·	2.6 km	MPC · JPL
36889	2000 SW_{166}	—	September 23, 2000	Socorro	LINEAR	EOS	6.5 km	MPC · JPL
36890	2000 SO_{167}	—	September 23, 2000	Socorro	LINEAR	MAR · slow	3.1 km	MPC · JPL
36891	2000 SJ_{168}	—	September 23, 2000	Socorro	LINEAR	·	5.2 km	MPC · JPL
36892	2000 SB_{169}	—	September 23, 2000	Socorro	LINEAR	·	2.6 km	MPC · JPL
36893	2000 SA_{170}	—	September 24, 2000	Socorro	LINEAR	·	3.1 km	MPC · JPL
36894	2000 SK_{170}	—	September 24, 2000	Socorro	LINEAR	·	5.0 km	MPC · JPL
36895	2000 SL_{171}	—	September 24, 2000	Socorro	LINEAR	EOS	5.9 km	MPC · JPL
36896	2000 SQ_{171}	—	September 25, 2000	Socorro	LINEAR	EOS	4.7 km	MPC · JPL
36897	2000 SB_{172}	—	September 27, 2000	Socorro	LINEAR	MAR	6.2 km	MPC · JPL
36898	2000 SE_{172}	—	September 27, 2000	Socorro	LINEAR	·	9.5 km	MPC · JPL
36899	2000 SW_{172}	—	September 27, 2000	Socorro	LINEAR	·	2.7 km	MPC · JPL
36900	2000 SZ_{176}	—	September 28, 2000	Socorro	LINEAR	EOS	5.0 km	MPC · JPL

== 36901–37000 ==
back to top

Designation			Discovery			Properties		Ref
Permanent	Provisional	Named after	Date	Site	Discoverer(s)	Category	Diam.	Ref
36901	2000 SK_{177}	—	September 28, 2000	Socorro	LINEAR	·	2.8 km	MPC · JPL
36902	2000 SN_{177}	—	September 28, 2000	Socorro	LINEAR	·	3.4 km	MPC · JPL
36903	2000 SO_{179}	—	September 28, 2000	Socorro	LINEAR	·	4.2 km	MPC · JPL
36904	2000 SS_{179}	—	September 28, 2000	Socorro	LINEAR	·	3.5 km	MPC · JPL
36905	2000 SX_{179}	—	September 28, 2000	Socorro	LINEAR	EMA	5.2 km	MPC · JPL
36906	2000 SZ_{179}	—	September 28, 2000	Socorro	LINEAR	·	4.2 km	MPC · JPL
36907	2000 SX_{181}	—	September 19, 2000	Haleakala	NEAT	EUN	3.6 km	MPC · JPL
36908	2000 SK_{182}	—	September 20, 2000	Socorro	LINEAR	·	2.6 km	MPC · JPL
36909	2000 SK_{185}	—	September 21, 2000	Kitt Peak	Spacewatch	NYS	2.1 km	MPC · JPL
36910	2000 SS_{187}	—	September 21, 2000	Haleakala	NEAT	EOS	5.6 km	MPC · JPL
36911	2000 SY_{187}	—	September 21, 2000	Haleakala	NEAT	AGN	2.6 km	MPC · JPL
36912	2000 SA_{188}	—	September 21, 2000	Haleakala	NEAT	PAD	4.9 km	MPC · JPL
36913	2000 SR_{188}	—	September 21, 2000	Haleakala	NEAT	·	2.8 km	MPC · JPL
36914	2000 SX_{191}	—	September 24, 2000	Socorro	LINEAR	THM	5.5 km	MPC · JPL
36915	2000 SP_{195}	—	September 24, 2000	Socorro	LINEAR	·	1.5 km	MPC · JPL
36916	2000 SW_{195}	—	September 24, 2000	Socorro	LINEAR	NYS	2.5 km	MPC · JPL
36917	2000 SJ_{205}	—	September 24, 2000	Socorro	LINEAR	AGN	2.5 km	MPC · JPL
36918	2000 SM_{205}	—	September 24, 2000	Socorro	LINEAR	·	2.0 km	MPC · JPL
36919	2000 SC_{207}	—	September 24, 2000	Socorro	LINEAR	MAS	2.2 km	MPC · JPL
36920	2000 SY_{207}	—	September 24, 2000	Socorro	LINEAR	THM	6.4 km	MPC · JPL
36921	2000 SB_{208}	—	September 24, 2000	Socorro	LINEAR	·	2.0 km	MPC · JPL
36922	2000 SN_{209}	—	September 25, 2000	Socorro	LINEAR	L5	18 km	MPC · JPL
36923	2000 SK_{211}	—	September 25, 2000	Socorro	LINEAR	·	2.8 km	MPC · JPL
36924	2000 SA_{212}	—	September 25, 2000	Socorro	LINEAR	·	9.0 km	MPC · JPL
36925	2000 SC_{212}	—	September 25, 2000	Socorro	LINEAR	V	4.0 km	MPC · JPL
36926	2000 SZ_{213}	—	September 25, 2000	Socorro	LINEAR	·	3.7 km	MPC · JPL
36927	2000 SJ_{216}	—	September 26, 2000	Socorro	LINEAR	RAF	3.3 km	MPC · JPL
36928	2000 SN_{216}	—	September 26, 2000	Socorro	LINEAR	·	2.8 km	MPC · JPL
36929	2000 SB_{217}	—	September 26, 2000	Socorro	LINEAR	·	4.0 km	MPC · JPL
36930	2000 SM_{217}	—	September 26, 2000	Socorro	LINEAR	EOS	5.2 km	MPC · JPL
36931	2000 SS_{220}	—	September 26, 2000	Socorro	LINEAR	V	2.8 km	MPC · JPL
36932	2000 SK_{221}	—	September 26, 2000	Socorro	LINEAR	·	6.2 km	MPC · JPL
36933	2000 SF_{222}	—	September 26, 2000	Socorro	LINEAR	EUN	3.2 km	MPC · JPL
36934	2000 SG_{226}	—	September 27, 2000	Socorro	LINEAR	·	2.7 km	MPC · JPL
36935	2000 SB_{227}	—	September 27, 2000	Socorro	LINEAR	V	2.2 km	MPC · JPL
36936	2000 SF_{227}	—	September 27, 2000	Socorro	LINEAR	EOS	7.3 km	MPC · JPL
36937	2000 SX_{229}	—	September 28, 2000	Socorro	LINEAR	·	4.8 km	MPC · JPL
36938	2000 SA_{234}	—	September 21, 2000	Socorro	LINEAR	·	2.0 km	MPC · JPL
36939	2000 SB_{237}	—	September 24, 2000	Socorro	LINEAR	THM	3.8 km	MPC · JPL
36940	2000 SA_{239}	—	September 26, 2000	Socorro	LINEAR	PHO	5.3 km	MPC · JPL
36941	2000 SV_{239}	—	September 28, 2000	Socorro	LINEAR	3:2	7.7 km	MPC · JPL
36942	2000 SK_{241}	—	September 24, 2000	Socorro	LINEAR	·	2.0 km	MPC · JPL
36943	2000 SF_{242}	—	September 24, 2000	Socorro	LINEAR	V	2.1 km	MPC · JPL
36944	2000 SD_{249}	—	September 24, 2000	Socorro	LINEAR	·	4.1 km	MPC · JPL
36945	2000 SM_{256}	—	September 24, 2000	Socorro	LINEAR	(16286)	3.8 km	MPC · JPL
36946	2000 SN_{256}	—	September 24, 2000	Socorro	LINEAR	·	3.9 km	MPC · JPL
36947	2000 SW_{258}	—	September 24, 2000	Socorro	LINEAR	·	2.0 km	MPC · JPL
36948	2000 SO_{259}	—	September 24, 2000	Socorro	LINEAR	·	3.0 km	MPC · JPL
36949	2000 SG_{260}	—	September 24, 2000	Socorro	LINEAR	·	3.4 km	MPC · JPL
36950	2000 SL_{260}	—	September 24, 2000	Socorro	LINEAR	·	4.4 km	MPC · JPL
36951	2000 SF_{261}	—	September 24, 2000	Socorro	LINEAR	·	5.4 km	MPC · JPL
36952	2000 SM_{266}	—	September 26, 2000	Socorro	LINEAR	·	3.9 km	MPC · JPL
36953	2000 SO_{267}	—	September 27, 2000	Socorro	LINEAR	KOR	3.3 km	MPC · JPL
36954	2000 SB_{269}	—	September 27, 2000	Socorro	LINEAR	·	4.4 km	MPC · JPL
36955	2000 SR_{270}	—	September 27, 2000	Socorro	LINEAR	·	4.5 km	MPC · JPL
36956	2000 SU_{273}	—	September 28, 2000	Socorro	LINEAR	·	6.1 km	MPC · JPL
36957	2000 SB_{275}	—	September 28, 2000	Socorro	LINEAR	·	4.8 km	MPC · JPL
36958	2000 SQ_{276}	—	September 30, 2000	Socorro	LINEAR	·	4.9 km	MPC · JPL
36959	2000 SS_{279}	—	September 25, 2000	Socorro	LINEAR	·	5.1 km	MPC · JPL
36960	2000 SV_{279}	—	September 25, 2000	Socorro	LINEAR	MAR	2.7 km	MPC · JPL
36961	2000 SL_{280}	—	September 30, 2000	Socorro	LINEAR	·	2.0 km	MPC · JPL
36962	2000 SM_{280}	—	September 30, 2000	Socorro	LINEAR	·	2.4 km	MPC · JPL
36963	2000 SF_{285}	—	September 23, 2000	Socorro	LINEAR	·	2.1 km	MPC · JPL
36964	2000 SK_{287}	—	September 26, 2000	Socorro	LINEAR	MAR	3.4 km	MPC · JPL
36965	2000 SU_{289}	—	September 27, 2000	Socorro	LINEAR	·	3.6 km	MPC · JPL
36966	2000 SA_{290}	—	September 27, 2000	Socorro	LINEAR	·	2.1 km	MPC · JPL
36967	2000 SV_{292}	—	September 27, 2000	Socorro	LINEAR	EOS	6.3 km	MPC · JPL
36968	2000 SD_{293}	—	September 27, 2000	Socorro	LINEAR	·	9.0 km	MPC · JPL
36969	2000 SH_{295}	—	September 27, 2000	Socorro	LINEAR	EUN	5.0 km	MPC · JPL
36970	2000 SX_{297}	—	September 28, 2000	Socorro	LINEAR	·	3.6 km	MPC · JPL
36971	2000 SX_{301}	—	September 28, 2000	Socorro	LINEAR	·	2.2 km	MPC · JPL
36972	2000 SF_{302}	—	September 28, 2000	Socorro	LINEAR	·	3.4 km	MPC · JPL
36973	2000 SY_{307}	—	September 30, 2000	Socorro	LINEAR	·	1.8 km	MPC · JPL
36974	2000 SP_{309}	—	September 24, 2000	Socorro	LINEAR	·	3.6 km	MPC · JPL
36975	2000 SR_{313}	—	September 27, 2000	Socorro	LINEAR	·	3.9 km	MPC · JPL
36976	2000 SU_{318}	—	September 26, 2000	Socorro	LINEAR	·	4.6 km	MPC · JPL
36977	2000 SK_{320}	—	September 29, 2000	Kitt Peak	Spacewatch	·	4.0 km	MPC · JPL
36978	2000 SL_{323}	—	September 28, 2000	Socorro	LINEAR	NYS	2.4 km	MPC · JPL
36979	2000 SP_{327}	—	September 30, 2000	Socorro	LINEAR	·	11 km	MPC · JPL
36980	2000 SE_{336}	—	September 26, 2000	Haleakala	NEAT	NYS	1.6 km	MPC · JPL
36981	2000 SW_{336}	—	September 26, 2000	Haleakala	NEAT	·	1.9 km	MPC · JPL
36982	2000 SX_{336}	—	September 26, 2000	Haleakala	NEAT	·	4.3 km	MPC · JPL
36983 Sumner	2000 SB_{346}	Sumner	September 21, 2000	Kitt Peak	M. W. Buie	·	6.5 km	MPC · JPL
36984	2000 SM_{348}	—	September 20, 2000	Socorro	LINEAR	MAR	3.0 km	MPC · JPL
36985	2000 SH_{349}	—	September 30, 2000	Anderson Mesa	LONEOS	·	2.2 km	MPC · JPL
36986 Stickle	2000 SP_{351}	Stickle	September 29, 2000	Anderson Mesa	LONEOS	·	6.3 km	MPC · JPL
36987	2000 ST_{351}	—	September 29, 2000	Anderson Mesa	LONEOS	·	6.8 km	MPC · JPL
36988	2000 SE_{353}	—	September 30, 2000	Anderson Mesa	LONEOS	·	3.7 km	MPC · JPL
36989	2000 SR_{355}	—	September 29, 2000	Anderson Mesa	LONEOS	·	4.9 km	MPC · JPL
36990	2000 SA_{359}	—	September 27, 2000	Socorro	LINEAR	·	3.8 km	MPC · JPL
36991	2000 SY_{360}	—	September 23, 2000	Anderson Mesa	LONEOS	·	3.3 km	MPC · JPL
36992 Jakubek	2000 SN_{361}	Jakubek	September 23, 2000	Anderson Mesa	LONEOS	·	3.3 km	MPC · JPL
36993	2000 SM_{364}	—	September 20, 2000	Socorro	LINEAR	EOS	5.4 km	MPC · JPL
36994 Pugel	2000 SP_{370}	Pugel	September 25, 2000	Anderson Mesa	LONEOS	·	4.3 km	MPC · JPL
36995	2000 TX_{4}	—	October 1, 2000	Socorro	LINEAR	·	4.5 km	MPC · JPL
36996	2000 TY_{15}	—	October 1, 2000	Socorro	LINEAR	·	3.6 km	MPC · JPL
36997	2000 TK_{17}	—	October 1, 2000	Socorro	LINEAR	·	7.7 km	MPC · JPL
36998	2000 TC_{21}	—	October 1, 2000	Socorro	LINEAR	EOS	5.2 km	MPC · JPL
36999	2000 TN_{22}	—	October 4, 2000	Haleakala	NEAT	·	4.1 km	MPC · JPL
37000	2000 TG_{25}	—	October 2, 2000	Socorro	LINEAR	(5)	3.6 km	MPC · JPL

back to top

== See also ==
- Meanings of minor-planet names: 36001–37000
