= Meanings of minor-planet names: 36001–37000 =

As minor planet discoveries are confirmed, they are given a permanent number by the IAU's Minor Planet Center (MPC), and the discoverers can then submit names for them, following the IAU's naming conventions. The list below concerns those minor planets in the specified number-range that have received names, and explains the meanings of those names.

Official naming citations of newly named small Solar System bodies are approved and published in a bulletin by IAU's Working Group for Small Bodies Nomenclature (WGSBN). Before May 2021, citations were published in MPC's Minor Planet Circulars for many decades. Recent citations can also be found on the JPL Small-Body Database (SBDB). Until his death in 2016, German astronomer Lutz D. Schmadel compiled these citations into the Dictionary of Minor Planet Names (DMP) and regularly updated the collection.

Based on Paul Herget's The Names of the Minor Planets, Schmadel also researched the unclear origin of numerous asteroids, most of which had been named prior to World War II. This article incorporates text from this source, which is in the public domain: SBDB New namings may only be added to this list below after official publication as the preannouncement of names is condemned. The WGSBN publishes a comprehensive guideline for the naming rules of non-cometary small Solar System bodies.

== 36001–36100 ==
Named minor planet	Provisional	This minor planet was named for...	Ref; Catalog
36033 Viseggi	1999 OC_{1}	Mount Viseggi in Italy, on top of which the discovering Monte Viseggi Observatory (126) is located.	JPL · 36033
36035 Petrvok	1999 PV	Peter Vok of Rosenberg (1539–1611; Czech: Petr Vok z Rožmberka), a Czech nobleman and the last member of the medieval South Bohemian Rosenberg family	JPL · 36035
36036 Bonucci	1999 PQ_{1}	Arturo Bonucci (1954–2002), an Italian cellist and amateur astrophotographer	JPL · 36036
36037 Linenschmidt	1999 PQ_{3}	Robb Linenschmidt (1970–1993), American aerospace engineer and friend of the discoverers, Dan Bruton and Carlton F. Stewart	JPL · 36037
36039 Joandunham	1999 PA_{4}	Joan Dunham (b. 1944) has a PhD in aerospace engineering and is the Secretary/Treasurer of the International Occultation Timing Association. She has been active in the field since 1966 when she began observing and analyzing occultations at the US Naval Observatory. This work continued during subsequent employment with NASA contractors and into retirement.	IAU · 36039
36060 Babuška	1999 RM_{43}	Ivo Babuška (born 1926), Czech-American mathematician, founder of the journal Applications of Mathematics, honorary member of the Czech Learned Society	JPL · 36060
36061 Haldane	1999 RJ_{44}	J. B. S. Haldane (1892–1964), British biologist and philosopher of science	JPL · 36061

== 36101–36200 ==
back to top

Named minor planet	Provisional	This minor planet was named for...	Ref; Catalog
36169 Grosseteste	1999 RG_{240}	Robert Grosseteste, an English statesman, natural philosopher and theologian.	JPL · 36169
36174 Podolský	1999 SW_{2}	Jiří Podolský (born 1963), Czech theoretical physicist and professor at the Charles University in Prague.	JPL · 36174
36177 Tonysharon	1999 SJ_{14}	Anthony P. Sharon, Deputy Executive Vice President of MIT.	JPL · 36177
36182 Montigiani	1999 TY_{12}	Montigiani Roberto, Italian amateur astronomer and friend of the discoverer	JPL · 36182
36184 Pavelbožek	1999 TQ_{17}	Pavel Božek (born 1958) is a respected surgeon from Břeclav, Czech Republic. He is interested in astronomy and cosmonautics.	JPL · 36184
36187 Travisbarman	1999 TB_{37}	Travis Barman, assistant astronomer at Lowell Observatory	JPL · 36187

== 36201–36300 ==
back to top

Named minor planet	Provisional	This minor planet was named for...	Ref; Catalog
36213 Robertotisgreen	1999 TU_{158}	Robert Otis Green (born 1960) has provided leadership and expertise in imaging spectroscopy for Earth and Planetary Science since joining the JPL in 1983. His knowledge of phenomenology and instrumentation is deep and broad, his science is first class, and his passion for discovery is infectious.	JPL · 36213
36226 Mackerras	1999 UQ_{4}	Sir Charles Mackerras, Australian-American orchestra conductor	JPL · 36226
36235 Sergebaudo	1999 VJ	Serge Baudo, French orchestra conductor	JPL · 36235
36264 Kojimatsumoto	1999 XL_{152}	Koji Matsumoto (born 1968) is a Japanese planetary geodesist. He has contributed to the SELENE mission analysis of the lunar gravity field and to the Hayabusa2 mission analysis of the spacecraft trajectory using LIDAR data.	IAU · 36264

== 36301–36400 ==
back to top

Named minor planet	Provisional	This minor planet was named for...	Ref; Catalog
36329 Philmetzger	2000 LU_{35}	Philip Metzger (born 1962) is an Associate Scientist at the Florida Space Institute (Orlando, Florida) and a leader in the study of the mechanical properties of Lunar and asteroid regoliths including how rocket exhaust interacts with regolith and requirements to protect Apollo sites from damage.	IAU · 36329
36340 Vaduvescu	2000 NT_{13}	Ovidiu Vaduvescu (born 1967) is a Romanian astronomer at ING (La Palma, Spain) whose career has spanned several countries. A dedicated observer, he has worked on near-Earth asteroids and dwarf galaxies. Many students and amateur astronomers have benefited from his teaching skills.	IAU · 36340
36352 Erickmeza	2000 NE_{25}	Erick Meza (born 1980) is the principal researcher for a new 1-m telescope at the Peruvian Space Agency, CONIDA (Moquegua, Peru). His work includes telescope commissioning, astrometry for stellar occultation predictions, and studying Pluto's atmosphere.	IAU · 36352

== 36401–36500 ==
back to top

Named minor planet	Provisional	This minor planet was named for...	Ref; Catalog
36424 Satokokumasaki	2000 PZ_{3}	Satoko Kumasaki (born 1958) has devoted herself to elementary education since 1992. She organized the Primary Education Study Group at the Kawai Institute for Culture and Education.	JPL · 36424
36426 Kakuda	2000 PJ_{7}	Kakuda is a city in Miyagi Prefecture, Japan	JPL · 36426
36444 Clairblackburn	2000 PA_{31}	Clair Blackburn (1940–2018) was a tireless and infectiously positive force for astronomy education and outreach in Tonopah, Nevada. He was an early adopter and supporter of the Research and Education Collaborative Occultation Network.	JPL · 36444
36445 Smalley	2000 QU	Kyle Smalley, American amateur astronomer and team member of the Powell Observatory Near-Earth-Object follow-up program	JPL · 36445
36446 Cinodapistoia	2000 QV	Cino da Pistoia (Guittoncino dei Sinibaldi or Sighibuldi), mediaeval Tuscan jurist and poet, friend of Dante Alighieri and Francesco Petrarch	JPL · 36446
36472 Ebina	2000 QQ_{26}	Ebina, a town in central Kanagawa Prefecture.	JPL · 36472

== 36501–36600 ==
back to top

Named minor planet	Provisional	This minor planet was named for...	Ref; Catalog
There are no named minor planets in this number range

== 36601–36700 ==
back to top

Named minor planet	Provisional	This minor planet was named for...	Ref; Catalog
36614 Saltis	2000 QU_{148}	Saltis, a nickname for the discovering Stockholm Observatory at Saltsjöbaden, Sweden	JPL · 36614
36624 Ablerus	2000 QA_{157}	Ablerus, a Trojan warrior mentioned in Homer’s Iliad.	IAU · 36624
36672 Sidi	2000 QR_{220}	Sidonie Adlersburg (1933–1943), an Austrian Roma victim of Auschwitz, memorialized in Erich Hackl's novel Abschied von Sidonie	JPL · 36672

== 36701–36800 ==
back to top

Named minor planet	Provisional	This minor planet was named for...	Ref; Catalog
36773 Tuttlekeane	2000 RQ_{99}	James Tuttle Keane (born 1987) is a postdoctoral researcher at the California Institute of Technology studying the tidal evolution of solar system planets, satellites, and small bodies, who also has a talent for clear illustration of planetary processes.	IAU · 36773
36774 Kuittinen	2000 RK_{101}	Risto Kuittinen, Director General of the Finnish Geodetic Institute during 1998–2011	JPL · 36774
36782 Okauchitakashige	2000 SR_{4}	Takashige Okauchi (born 1938) contributed to the recovery and investigation of the meteorite "Kokubunji Inseki". He participated in the activities of the Japan Spaceguard Association, such as "Spaceguard Tanteidan".	JPL · 36782
36783 Kagamino	2000 SD_{7}	Kagamino Town is in the northern part of Okayama Prefecture in Japan. JPL	MPC · 36783
36800 Katarinawitt	2000 SF_{45}	Katarina Witt, German figure skater, olympic champion, four-time World Figure Skating champion, German "Ice Skater of the Century"	JPL · 36800

== 36801–36900 ==
back to top

Named minor planet	Provisional	This minor planet was named for...	Ref; Catalog
36888 Škrabal	2000 SE_{163}	Emil Škrabal, Czech construction engineer and amateur astronomer, member of the Czech Society for Interplanetary Matter and an honorary member of the Czech Astronomical Society	JPL · 36888

== 36901–37000 ==
back to top

Named minor planet	Provisional	This minor planet was named for...	Ref; Catalog
36983 Sumner	2000 SB_{346}	James Edward (Red) Sumner Jr. (born 1948) has distinguished himself as a stellar occultation observer. In particular, he has provided essential education and outreach support for the Research and Education Collaborative Occultation Network.	JPL · 36983
36986 Stickle	2000 SP_{351}	Angela M. Stickle (born 1984) is a planetary scientist at Johns Hopkins University Applied Physics Laboratory. Dr. Stickle specializes in impact physics and kinetic asteroid deflection.	IAU · 36986
36992 Jakubek	2000 SN_{361}	Ryan Scott Jakubek (b. 1990), an American planetary scientist	IAU · 36992
36994 Pugel	2000 SP_{370}	Betsy Pugel (b. 1973), an American scientist.	IAU · 36994

back to top

Preceded by 35,001–36,000	Meanings of minor-planet names List of minor planets: 36,001–37,000	Succeeded by 37,001–38,000
