= Comet Garradd =

Comet Garradd or Garradd's Comet refers to any of the 17 comets discovered by Australian astronomer, Gordon J. Garradd, below:

- 186P/Garradd
- 259P/Garradd
- 296P/Garradd
- 436P/Garradd
- C/2006 L1 (Garradd)
- C/2006 O2 (Garradd)
- C/2007 E1 (Garradd)
- C/2007 Q1 (Garradd)
- C/2008 E3 (Garradd)
- C/2008 J5 (Garradd)
- C/2008 P1 (Garradd)
- C/2008 Q3 (Garradd)
- C/2009 P1 (Garradd)
- C/2009 U1 (Garradd)
- C/2010 E1 (Garradd)
- C/2010 FB87 (WISE–Garradd)
- C/2010 H1 (Garradd)
