= List of minor planets: 691001–692000 =

The following is a partial list of minor planets, running from minor-planet number 691001 through 692000, inclusive. The primary data for this and other partial lists is based on JPL's "Small-Body Orbital Elements" and data available from the Minor Planet Center. Critical list information is also provided by the MPC, unless otherwise specified from Lowell Observatory. A detailed description of the table's columns and additional sources are given on the main page including a complete list of every page in this series, and a statistical break-up on the dynamical classification of minor planets.

Also see the summary list of all named bodies in numerical and alphabetical order, and the corresponding naming citations for the number range of this particular list. New namings may only be added to this list after official publication, as the preannouncement of names is condemned by the Working Group for Small Bodies Nomenclature of the International Astronomical Union.

Near-Earth obj.	MBA (inner)	MBA (outer)	Centaur
Mars-crosser	MBA (middle)	Jupiter trojan	Trans-Neptunian obj.
Unclassified

== 691001–691100 ==
Designation			Discovery			Properties		Ref
Permanent	Provisional	Named after	Date	Site	Discoverer(s)	Category	Diam.	Ref
691001	2014 OP_{62}	—	September 24, 2009	Mount Lemmon	Mount Lemmon Survey	·	2.5 km	MPC · JPL
691002	2014 OV_{62}	—	May 8, 2013	Haleakala	Pan-STARRS 1	·	2.6 km	MPC · JPL
691003	2014 OK_{64}	—	October 25, 2001	Apache Point	SDSS Collaboration	PAD	1.4 km	MPC · JPL
691004	2014 OP_{65}	—	September 28, 2003	Apache Point	SDSS Collaboration	·	2.5 km	MPC · JPL
691005	2014 OV_{66}	—	March 9, 2008	Kitt Peak	Spacewatch	·	2.0 km	MPC · JPL
691006	2014 OQ_{67}	—	April 11, 2013	Mount Lemmon	Mount Lemmon Survey	·	2.8 km	MPC · JPL
691007	2014 OU_{70}	—	April 4, 2008	Kitt Peak	Spacewatch	·	1.5 km	MPC · JPL
691008	2014 OA_{75}	—	June 27, 2014	Haleakala	Pan-STARRS 1	·	2.6 km	MPC · JPL
691009	2014 OP_{77}	—	April 8, 2013	Mount Lemmon	Mount Lemmon Survey	HYG	2.3 km	MPC · JPL
691010	2014 OB_{79}	—	July 26, 2014	Haleakala	Pan-STARRS 1	·	2.1 km	MPC · JPL
691011	2014 OB_{80}	—	July 26, 2014	Haleakala	Pan-STARRS 1	ELF	2.5 km	MPC · JPL
691012	2014 OW_{80}	—	June 30, 2014	Haleakala	Pan-STARRS 1	AGN	1 km	MPC · JPL
691013	2014 OJ_{83}	—	June 20, 2014	Haleakala	Pan-STARRS 1	·	2.6 km	MPC · JPL
691014	2014 OP_{83}	—	July 26, 2014	Haleakala	Pan-STARRS 1	·	1.5 km	MPC · JPL
691015	2014 OL_{84}	—	September 1, 2005	Kitt Peak	Spacewatch	·	1.7 km	MPC · JPL
691016	2014 OH_{85}	—	July 26, 2014	Haleakala	Pan-STARRS 1	·	2.1 km	MPC · JPL
691017	2014 OH_{86}	—	November 3, 2005	Kitt Peak	Spacewatch	EOS	1.7 km	MPC · JPL
691018	2014 OR_{87}	—	July 2, 2014	Haleakala	Pan-STARRS 1	·	2.5 km	MPC · JPL
691019	2014 OZ_{87}	—	April 13, 2013	Haleakala	Pan-STARRS 1	·	2.2 km	MPC · JPL
691020	2014 OK_{88}	—	August 10, 2007	Kitt Peak	Spacewatch	·	700 m	MPC · JPL
691021	2014 OH_{91}	—	February 13, 2008	Kitt Peak	Spacewatch	·	1.4 km	MPC · JPL
691022	2014 OJ_{93}	—	April 10, 2013	Haleakala	Pan-STARRS 1	·	2.0 km	MPC · JPL
691023	2014 OK_{93}	—	February 13, 2002	Apache Point	SDSS Collaboration	·	1.8 km	MPC · JPL
691024	2014 OQ_{93}	—	July 26, 2014	Haleakala	Pan-STARRS 1	·	2.2 km	MPC · JPL
691025	2014 OF_{94}	—	July 26, 2014	Haleakala	Pan-STARRS 1	·	1.8 km	MPC · JPL
691026	2014 OD_{99}	—	July 26, 2014	Haleakala	Pan-STARRS 1	·	2.1 km	MPC · JPL
691027	2014 OC_{101}	—	July 29, 2008	Mount Lemmon	Mount Lemmon Survey	·	2.7 km	MPC · JPL
691028	2014 OY_{105}	—	July 27, 2014	Haleakala	Pan-STARRS 1	·	1.4 km	MPC · JPL
691029	2014 OF_{106}	—	June 27, 2014	Haleakala	Pan-STARRS 1	·	1.8 km	MPC · JPL
691030	2014 OH_{106}	—	July 25, 2014	Haleakala	Pan-STARRS 1	·	1.9 km	MPC · JPL
691031	2014 OJ_{109}	—	July 27, 2014	Haleakala	Pan-STARRS 1	EUN	860 m	MPC · JPL
691032	2014 OY_{109}	—	July 27, 2014	Haleakala	Pan-STARRS 1	·	1.8 km	MPC · JPL
691033	2014 OR_{111}	—	September 24, 2009	Mount Lemmon	Mount Lemmon Survey	·	2.2 km	MPC · JPL
691034	2014 OT_{113}	—	December 30, 2011	Kitt Peak	Spacewatch	·	2.4 km	MPC · JPL
691035	2014 OX_{113}	—	July 25, 2014	Haleakala	Pan-STARRS 1	·	2.2 km	MPC · JPL
691036	2014 OF_{114}	—	January 19, 2012	Haleakala	Pan-STARRS 1	EOS	1.7 km	MPC · JPL
691037	2014 OL_{114}	—	February 15, 2012	Haleakala	Pan-STARRS 1	EOS	1.6 km	MPC · JPL
691038	2014 OR_{114}	—	February 13, 2002	Kitt Peak	Spacewatch	·	1.9 km	MPC · JPL
691039	2014 OA_{115}	—	July 4, 2014	Haleakala	Pan-STARRS 1	·	2.2 km	MPC · JPL
691040	2014 OA_{117}	—	June 24, 2014	Mount Lemmon	Mount Lemmon Survey	·	2.1 km	MPC · JPL
691041	2014 OJ_{118}	—	July 25, 2014	Haleakala	Pan-STARRS 1	·	1.5 km	MPC · JPL
691042	2014 OC_{120}	—	January 19, 2012	Haleakala	Pan-STARRS 1	·	2.4 km	MPC · JPL
691043	2014 OE_{121}	—	February 3, 2008	Kitt Peak	Spacewatch	·	1.2 km	MPC · JPL
691044	2014 OY_{122}	—	July 25, 2014	Haleakala	Pan-STARRS 1	·	1.4 km	MPC · JPL
691045	2014 OD_{123}	—	July 3, 2014	Haleakala	Pan-STARRS 1	·	2.6 km	MPC · JPL
691046	2014 OW_{124}	—	April 7, 2013	Mount Lemmon	Mount Lemmon Survey	·	1.8 km	MPC · JPL
691047	2014 OT_{125}	—	July 25, 2014	Haleakala	Pan-STARRS 1	THM	1.8 km	MPC · JPL
691048	2014 OO_{126}	—	July 25, 2014	Haleakala	Pan-STARRS 1	·	2.3 km	MPC · JPL
691049	2014 OM_{132}	—	March 16, 2013	Kitt Peak	Spacewatch	·	1.7 km	MPC · JPL
691050	2014 OD_{135}	—	March 9, 2007	Mount Lemmon	Mount Lemmon Survey	·	2.2 km	MPC · JPL
691051	2014 OF_{135}	—	November 27, 2010	Mount Lemmon	Mount Lemmon Survey	·	1.9 km	MPC · JPL
691052	2014 ON_{135}	—	January 30, 2006	Kitt Peak	Spacewatch	EOS	1.6 km	MPC · JPL
691053	2014 OD_{137}	—	July 25, 2014	Haleakala	Pan-STARRS 1	·	2.4 km	MPC · JPL
691054	2014 OD_{138}	—	March 16, 2012	Haleakala	Pan-STARRS 1	VER	2.4 km	MPC · JPL
691055	2014 OZ_{140}	—	July 3, 2014	Haleakala	Pan-STARRS 1	·	2.3 km	MPC · JPL
691056	2014 OH_{141}	—	May 27, 2008	Kitt Peak	Spacewatch	·	2.0 km	MPC · JPL
691057	2014 OW_{142}	—	July 27, 2014	Haleakala	Pan-STARRS 1	·	1.5 km	MPC · JPL
691058	2014 OB_{145}	—	July 27, 2014	Haleakala	Pan-STARRS 1	·	2.2 km	MPC · JPL
691059	2014 OX_{145}	—	October 23, 2006	Mount Lemmon	Mount Lemmon Survey	·	1.6 km	MPC · JPL
691060	2014 ON_{147}	—	July 27, 2014	Haleakala	Pan-STARRS 1	·	2.1 km	MPC · JPL
691061	2014 OO_{147}	—	January 19, 2012	Haleakala	Pan-STARRS 1	·	2.4 km	MPC · JPL
691062	2014 OK_{149}	—	January 4, 2006	Kitt Peak	Spacewatch	·	2.2 km	MPC · JPL
691063	2014 OO_{149}	—	July 25, 2014	Haleakala	Pan-STARRS 1	·	2.2 km	MPC · JPL
691064	2014 OZ_{149}	—	September 29, 2010	Mount Lemmon	Mount Lemmon Survey	·	1.4 km	MPC · JPL
691065	2014 OQ_{150}	—	March 20, 2010	Mount Lemmon	Mount Lemmon Survey	·	580 m	MPC · JPL
691066	2014 OB_{153}	—	August 17, 2009	Kitt Peak	Spacewatch	·	2.2 km	MPC · JPL
691067	2014 OH_{154}	—	April 10, 2013	Mount Lemmon	Mount Lemmon Survey	·	2.3 km	MPC · JPL
691068	2014 OM_{155}	—	July 27, 2005	Palomar	NEAT	·	2.0 km	MPC · JPL
691069	2014 OD_{157}	—	July 27, 2014	Haleakala	Pan-STARRS 1	·	2.5 km	MPC · JPL
691070	2014 ON_{157}	—	June 30, 2014	Haleakala	Pan-STARRS 1	·	800 m	MPC · JPL
691071	2014 OQ_{157}	—	July 27, 2014	Haleakala	Pan-STARRS 1	·	2.0 km	MPC · JPL
691072	2014 OR_{157}	—	June 30, 2014	Haleakala	Pan-STARRS 1	·	2.6 km	MPC · JPL
691073	2014 OV_{157}	—	May 3, 2008	Mount Lemmon	Mount Lemmon Survey	EOS	1.7 km	MPC · JPL
691074	2014 OP_{158}	—	July 27, 2014	Haleakala	Pan-STARRS 1	EOS	1.5 km	MPC · JPL
691075	2014 OL_{159}	—	June 30, 2014	Haleakala	Pan-STARRS 1	·	2.3 km	MPC · JPL
691076	2014 OO_{159}	—	July 27, 2014	Haleakala	Pan-STARRS 1	·	810 m	MPC · JPL
691077	2014 OX_{161}	—	March 4, 2008	Kitt Peak	Spacewatch	·	1.8 km	MPC · JPL
691078	2014 ON_{164}	—	April 17, 2010	Mount Lemmon	Mount Lemmon Survey	·	720 m	MPC · JPL
691079	2014 OM_{165}	—	July 27, 2014	Haleakala	Pan-STARRS 1	·	2.1 km	MPC · JPL
691080	2014 OR_{166}	—	March 19, 2013	Palomar	Palomar Transient Factory	·	1.7 km	MPC · JPL
691081	2014 OB_{167}	—	August 15, 2004	Cerro Tololo	Deep Ecliptic Survey	·	1.8 km	MPC · JPL
691082	2014 OX_{170}	—	July 27, 2014	Haleakala	Pan-STARRS 1	·	910 m	MPC · JPL
691083	2014 OF_{173}	—	November 2, 2010	Mount Lemmon	Mount Lemmon Survey	·	1.8 km	MPC · JPL
691084	2014 OA_{176}	—	July 27, 2014	Haleakala	Pan-STARRS 1	·	2.1 km	MPC · JPL
691085	2014 OT_{177}	—	February 20, 2001	Kitt Peak	Spacewatch	·	2.6 km	MPC · JPL
691086	2014 OO_{179}	—	July 27, 2014	Haleakala	Pan-STARRS 1	EOS	1.6 km	MPC · JPL
691087	2014 OR_{182}	—	March 9, 2007	Mount Lemmon	Mount Lemmon Survey	·	2.2 km	MPC · JPL
691088	2014 OH_{183}	—	May 15, 2008	Mount Lemmon	Mount Lemmon Survey	·	1.9 km	MPC · JPL
691089	2014 OT_{183}	—	July 27, 2014	Haleakala	Pan-STARRS 1	·	2.0 km	MPC · JPL
691090	2014 OG_{186}	—	January 23, 2006	Kitt Peak	Spacewatch	·	2.3 km	MPC · JPL
691091	2014 OP_{186}	—	September 22, 2003	Anderson Mesa	LONEOS	TIR	2.5 km	MPC · JPL
691092	2014 OC_{190}	—	March 13, 2012	Mount Lemmon	Mount Lemmon Survey	·	2.2 km	MPC · JPL
691093	2014 OD_{190}	—	October 16, 2003	Palomar	NEAT	·	2.1 km	MPC · JPL
691094	2014 OL_{190}	—	July 27, 2014	Haleakala	Pan-STARRS 1	·	1.9 km	MPC · JPL
691095	2014 OZ_{191}	—	July 28, 2008	Mount Lemmon	Mount Lemmon Survey	·	2.8 km	MPC · JPL
691096	2014 OK_{192}	—	November 11, 2009	Kitt Peak	Spacewatch	·	2.1 km	MPC · JPL
691097	2014 OF_{194}	—	July 27, 2014	Haleakala	Pan-STARRS 1	H	430 m	MPC · JPL
691098	2014 OW_{197}	—	July 27, 2014	Haleakala	Pan-STARRS 1	·	770 m	MPC · JPL
691099	2014 OQ_{199}	—	August 24, 2009	Altschwendt	W. Ries	·	2.6 km	MPC · JPL
691100	2014 OZ_{200}	—	April 10, 2010	Mount Lemmon	Mount Lemmon Survey	·	480 m	MPC · JPL

== 691101–691200 ==
back to top

Designation			Discovery			Properties		Ref
Permanent	Provisional	Named after	Date	Site	Discoverer(s)	Category	Diam.	Ref
691101	2014 OW_{201}	—	November 2, 2010	Mount Lemmon	Mount Lemmon Survey	KOR	1.1 km	MPC · JPL
691102	2014 OD_{202}	—	July 28, 2014	Haleakala	Pan-STARRS 1	·	2.5 km	MPC · JPL
691103	2014 OF_{203}	—	July 28, 2014	Haleakala	Pan-STARRS 1	KOR	1.1 km	MPC · JPL
691104	2014 OG_{203}	—	January 16, 2011	Mount Lemmon	Mount Lemmon Survey	·	2.3 km	MPC · JPL
691105	2014 OR_{203}	—	November 3, 2005	Mount Lemmon	Mount Lemmon Survey	·	1.4 km	MPC · JPL
691106	2014 OS_{203}	—	March 18, 2013	Mount Lemmon	Mount Lemmon Survey	THM	2.1 km	MPC · JPL
691107	2014 ON_{204}	—	March 5, 2008	Mount Lemmon	Mount Lemmon Survey	WIT	810 m	MPC · JPL
691108	2014 OP_{204}	—	January 26, 2006	Kitt Peak	Spacewatch	ELF	2.7 km	MPC · JPL
691109	2014 OG_{206}	—	July 8, 2014	Haleakala	Pan-STARRS 1	·	2.0 km	MPC · JPL
691110	2014 OY_{206}	—	June 21, 2014	Mount Lemmon	Mount Lemmon Survey	·	2.5 km	MPC · JPL
691111	2014 OD_{207}	—	May 2, 2013	Kitt Peak	Spacewatch	·	2.7 km	MPC · JPL
691112	2014 OC_{208}	—	May 25, 2014	Haleakala	Pan-STARRS 1	·	2.2 km	MPC · JPL
691113	2014 OY_{208}	—	December 6, 2011	Haleakala	Pan-STARRS 1	NYS	850 m	MPC · JPL
691114	2014 OQ_{214}	—	February 10, 2008	Mount Lemmon	Mount Lemmon Survey	AGN	930 m	MPC · JPL
691115	2014 OY_{214}	—	July 27, 2014	Haleakala	Pan-STARRS 1	VER	2.2 km	MPC · JPL
691116	2014 OD_{218}	—	February 28, 2008	Mount Lemmon	Mount Lemmon Survey	·	1.4 km	MPC · JPL
691117	2014 OA_{219}	—	July 27, 2014	Haleakala	Pan-STARRS 1	·	2.8 km	MPC · JPL
691118	2014 OV_{219}	—	July 27, 2014	Haleakala	Pan-STARRS 1	·	2.3 km	MPC · JPL
691119	2014 OY_{219}	—	November 8, 2010	Mount Lemmon	Mount Lemmon Survey	·	2.3 km	MPC · JPL
691120	2014 OA_{221}	—	February 9, 2013	Haleakala	Pan-STARRS 1	·	910 m	MPC · JPL
691121	2014 OR_{222}	—	February 3, 2012	Haleakala	Pan-STARRS 1	EOS	1.5 km	MPC · JPL
691122	2014 OQ_{223}	—	January 29, 2011	Mount Lemmon	Mount Lemmon Survey	·	2.9 km	MPC · JPL
691123	2014 OP_{224}	—	December 4, 2010	Mount Lemmon	Mount Lemmon Survey	·	2.5 km	MPC · JPL
691124	2014 OO_{227}	—	July 27, 2014	Haleakala	Pan-STARRS 1	·	2.5 km	MPC · JPL
691125	2014 OX_{227}	—	April 15, 2007	Kitt Peak	Spacewatch	·	2.8 km	MPC · JPL
691126	2014 OZ_{227}	—	March 13, 2002	Palomar	NEAT	TIR	2.9 km	MPC · JPL
691127	2014 OG_{229}	—	May 12, 2013	Haleakala	Pan-STARRS 1	·	2.0 km	MPC · JPL
691128	2014 OR_{230}	—	March 14, 2007	Kitt Peak	Spacewatch	·	2.1 km	MPC · JPL
691129	2014 OA_{233}	—	July 27, 2014	Haleakala	Pan-STARRS 1	EUP	2.2 km	MPC · JPL
691130	2014 ON_{233}	—	July 28, 2014	Haleakala	Pan-STARRS 1	·	490 m	MPC · JPL
691131	2014 OX_{235}	—	June 21, 2010	Mount Lemmon	Mount Lemmon Survey	·	1.8 km	MPC · JPL
691132	2014 OL_{237}	—	August 10, 2007	Kitt Peak	Spacewatch	·	750 m	MPC · JPL
691133	2014 ON_{237}	—	July 2, 2014	Haleakala	Pan-STARRS 1	VER	1.9 km	MPC · JPL
691134	2014 OA_{239}	—	November 10, 2010	Mount Lemmon	Mount Lemmon Survey	KOR	1.1 km	MPC · JPL
691135	2014 OO_{240}	—	April 4, 2008	Kitt Peak	Spacewatch	·	1.6 km	MPC · JPL
691136	2014 OL_{242}	—	July 29, 2014	Haleakala	Pan-STARRS 1	·	1.8 km	MPC · JPL
691137	2014 OK_{243}	—	June 30, 2014	Haleakala	Pan-STARRS 1	·	2.2 km	MPC · JPL
691138	2014 ON_{243}	—	November 5, 2010	Mount Lemmon	Mount Lemmon Survey	·	2.4 km	MPC · JPL
691139	2014 OX_{243}	—	October 20, 2011	Mayhill-ISON	L. Elenin	V	550 m	MPC · JPL
691140	2014 OG_{245}	—	February 28, 2008	Mount Lemmon	Mount Lemmon Survey	HOF	2.3 km	MPC · JPL
691141	2014 OZ_{245}	—	July 29, 2014	Haleakala	Pan-STARRS 1	V	410 m	MPC · JPL
691142	2014 OM_{247}	—	March 13, 2013	Mount Lemmon	Mount Lemmon Survey	·	760 m	MPC · JPL
691143	2014 OZ_{248}	—	April 16, 2013	Cerro Tololo	DECam	·	1.9 km	MPC · JPL
691144	2014 OD_{249}	—	July 29, 2014	Haleakala	Pan-STARRS 1	·	2.1 km	MPC · JPL
691145	2014 OZ_{249}	—	February 15, 2012	Haleakala	Pan-STARRS 1	EOS	1.8 km	MPC · JPL
691146	2014 OV_{251}	—	July 29, 2014	Haleakala	Pan-STARRS 1	HYG	2.0 km	MPC · JPL
691147	2014 OK_{252}	—	July 27, 2014	Haleakala	Pan-STARRS 1	·	2.1 km	MPC · JPL
691148	2014 OH_{253}	—	July 29, 2014	Haleakala	Pan-STARRS 1	·	460 m	MPC · JPL
691149	2014 ON_{255}	—	July 29, 2014	Haleakala	Pan-STARRS 1	VER	2.2 km	MPC · JPL
691150	2014 OD_{256}	—	July 27, 2014	Haleakala	Pan-STARRS 1	·	2.0 km	MPC · JPL
691151	2014 OE_{256}	—	July 3, 2014	Haleakala	Pan-STARRS 1	·	2.1 km	MPC · JPL
691152	2014 OX_{256}	—	March 9, 2002	Kitt Peak	Spacewatch	EOS	2.1 km	MPC · JPL
691153	2014 OE_{257}	—	October 10, 2004	Kitt Peak	Spacewatch	·	1.7 km	MPC · JPL
691154	2014 OH_{258}	—	September 21, 2009	Catalina	CSS	TIR	2.9 km	MPC · JPL
691155	2014 ON_{259}	—	December 25, 2010	Mount Lemmon	Mount Lemmon Survey	·	2.4 km	MPC · JPL
691156	2014 OQ_{260}	—	April 12, 2013	Haleakala	Pan-STARRS 1	VER	2.4 km	MPC · JPL
691157	2014 OW_{261}	—	January 18, 2009	Kitt Peak	Spacewatch	V	460 m	MPC · JPL
691158	2014 OR_{264}	—	May 1, 2013	Mount Lemmon	Mount Lemmon Survey	·	2.2 km	MPC · JPL
691159	2014 OB_{265}	—	July 29, 2014	Haleakala	Pan-STARRS 1	·	2.3 km	MPC · JPL
691160	2014 OF_{265}	—	July 29, 2014	Haleakala	Pan-STARRS 1	·	2.3 km	MPC · JPL
691161	2014 OL_{265}	—	February 13, 2008	Mount Lemmon	Mount Lemmon Survey	·	1.4 km	MPC · JPL
691162	2014 OW_{266}	—	June 29, 2014	Haleakala	Pan-STARRS 1	·	2.0 km	MPC · JPL
691163	2014 OY_{268}	—	November 21, 2005	Kitt Peak	Spacewatch	EOS	1.4 km	MPC · JPL
691164	2014 OM_{269}	—	May 13, 2013	Mount Lemmon	Mount Lemmon Survey	·	2.5 km	MPC · JPL
691165	2014 OJ_{271}	—	July 29, 2014	Haleakala	Pan-STARRS 1	·	2.4 km	MPC · JPL
691166	2014 OY_{271}	—	June 29, 2014	Haleakala	Pan-STARRS 1	·	2.4 km	MPC · JPL
691167	2014 OK_{272}	—	July 29, 2014	Haleakala	Pan-STARRS 1	·	2.4 km	MPC · JPL
691168	2014 OP_{272}	—	September 26, 2009	Kitt Peak	Spacewatch	·	2.4 km	MPC · JPL
691169	2014 OU_{272}	—	June 29, 2014	Haleakala	Pan-STARRS 1	·	660 m	MPC · JPL
691170	2014 OZ_{272}	—	October 23, 2006	Mount Lemmon	Mount Lemmon Survey	·	2.1 km	MPC · JPL
691171	2014 OX_{273}	—	July 29, 2014	Haleakala	Pan-STARRS 1	·	2.1 km	MPC · JPL
691172	2014 OV_{274}	—	July 29, 2014	Haleakala	Pan-STARRS 1	·	2.2 km	MPC · JPL
691173	2014 OZ_{274}	—	June 27, 2014	Haleakala	Pan-STARRS 1	HYG	2.5 km	MPC · JPL
691174	2014 OB_{276}	—	June 29, 2014	Haleakala	Pan-STARRS 1	·	2.5 km	MPC · JPL
691175	2014 OX_{276}	—	February 15, 2012	Haleakala	Pan-STARRS 1	·	2.2 km	MPC · JPL
691176	2014 OD_{277}	—	April 12, 2013	Haleakala	Pan-STARRS 1	·	1.5 km	MPC · JPL
691177	2014 OE_{279}	—	July 29, 2014	Haleakala	Pan-STARRS 1	·	2.2 km	MPC · JPL
691178	2014 OC_{280}	—	September 26, 2009	Kitt Peak	Spacewatch	·	2.8 km	MPC · JPL
691179	2014 OF_{281}	—	December 14, 2006	Kitt Peak	Spacewatch	·	2.3 km	MPC · JPL
691180	2014 OQ_{281}	—	July 6, 2014	Haleakala	Pan-STARRS 1	·	2.1 km	MPC · JPL
691181	2014 OO_{289}	—	July 29, 2014	Haleakala	Pan-STARRS 1	·	660 m	MPC · JPL
691182	2014 OP_{290}	—	March 21, 2012	Mount Lemmon	Mount Lemmon Survey	·	2.6 km	MPC · JPL
691183	2014 OA_{291}	—	September 5, 2007	Mauna Kea	D. D. Balam, K. M. Perrett	PHO	680 m	MPC · JPL
691184	2014 OH_{292}	—	September 18, 2010	Mount Lemmon	Mount Lemmon Survey	·	1.5 km	MPC · JPL
691185	2014 OY_{292}	—	February 24, 2012	Haleakala	Pan-STARRS 1	·	3.0 km	MPC · JPL
691186	2014 OH_{295}	—	May 1, 2003	Kitt Peak	Spacewatch	·	640 m	MPC · JPL
691187	2014 OU_{296}	—	July 29, 2014	Haleakala	Pan-STARRS 1	·	2.5 km	MPC · JPL
691188	2014 OB_{297}	—	January 19, 2012	Haleakala	Pan-STARRS 1	·	1.1 km	MPC · JPL
691189	2014 OT_{298}	—	July 29, 2014	Haleakala	Pan-STARRS 1	·	2.2 km	MPC · JPL
691190	2014 OW_{300}	—	March 9, 2008	Mount Lemmon	Mount Lemmon Survey	HOF	2.3 km	MPC · JPL
691191	2014 OZ_{300}	—	May 29, 2008	Kitt Peak	Spacewatch	·	2.3 km	MPC · JPL
691192	2014 OA_{302}	—	January 26, 2012	Mount Lemmon	Mount Lemmon Survey	·	2.3 km	MPC · JPL
691193	2014 OQ_{302}	—	February 3, 2012	Haleakala	Pan-STARRS 1	·	1.8 km	MPC · JPL
691194	2014 OT_{302}	—	July 25, 2014	Haleakala	Pan-STARRS 1	·	2.3 km	MPC · JPL
691195	2014 OD_{303}	—	July 25, 2014	Haleakala	Pan-STARRS 1	EUP	2.8 km	MPC · JPL
691196	2014 OV_{303}	—	June 27, 2014	Haleakala	Pan-STARRS 1	·	1.9 km	MPC · JPL
691197	2014 OP_{304}	—	June 27, 2014	Haleakala	Pan-STARRS 1	KOR	1.1 km	MPC · JPL
691198	2014 OX_{305}	—	July 25, 2014	Haleakala	Pan-STARRS 1	·	1.9 km	MPC · JPL
691199	2014 OZ_{307}	—	July 27, 2014	Haleakala	Pan-STARRS 1	HYG	2.0 km	MPC · JPL
691200	2014 OA_{308}	—	February 8, 1999	Mauna Kea	Anderson, J., Veillet, C.	AGN	970 m	MPC · JPL

== 691201–691300 ==
back to top

Designation			Discovery			Properties		Ref
Permanent	Provisional	Named after	Date	Site	Discoverer(s)	Category	Diam.	Ref
691201	2014 OT_{308}	—	January 22, 2006	Mount Lemmon	Mount Lemmon Survey	·	2.2 km	MPC · JPL
691202	2014 OZ_{308}	—	December 27, 2011	Mount Lemmon	Mount Lemmon Survey	·	1.6 km	MPC · JPL
691203	2014 OG_{310}	—	July 27, 2014	Haleakala	Pan-STARRS 1	·	2.1 km	MPC · JPL
691204	2014 OL_{310}	—	July 27, 2014	Haleakala	Pan-STARRS 1	LIX	2.7 km	MPC · JPL
691205	2014 OJ_{311}	—	April 13, 2013	Haleakala	Pan-STARRS 1	THM	1.7 km	MPC · JPL
691206	2014 OO_{311}	—	July 27, 2014	Haleakala	Pan-STARRS 1	·	2.1 km	MPC · JPL
691207	2014 OX_{311}	—	December 13, 2010	Mount Lemmon	Mount Lemmon Survey	·	2.0 km	MPC · JPL
691208	2014 OA_{312}	—	February 9, 2013	Haleakala	Pan-STARRS 1	V	410 m	MPC · JPL
691209	2014 OQ_{312}	—	June 2, 2014	Haleakala	Pan-STARRS 1	·	2.0 km	MPC · JPL
691210	2014 OH_{313}	—	July 27, 2014	Haleakala	Pan-STARRS 1	(5)	840 m	MPC · JPL
691211	2014 OM_{313}	—	December 27, 2011	Mount Lemmon	Mount Lemmon Survey	·	1.5 km	MPC · JPL
691212	2014 OL_{314}	—	July 27, 2014	Haleakala	Pan-STARRS 1	·	2.3 km	MPC · JPL
691213	2014 OH_{315}	—	December 14, 2010	Mount Lemmon	Mount Lemmon Survey	·	2.6 km	MPC · JPL
691214	2014 OT_{318}	—	June 27, 2014	ESA OGS	ESA OGS	·	1.5 km	MPC · JPL
691215	2014 ON_{320}	—	July 29, 2014	Haleakala	Pan-STARRS 1	·	2.1 km	MPC · JPL
691216	2014 OE_{321}	—	April 17, 2010	Mount Lemmon	Mount Lemmon Survey	·	610 m	MPC · JPL
691217	2014 OF_{322}	—	July 29, 2014	Haleakala	Pan-STARRS 1	·	1.9 km	MPC · JPL
691218	2014 OS_{323}	—	January 19, 2007	Mauna Kea	P. A. Wiegert	KOR	1.1 km	MPC · JPL
691219	2014 OK_{325}	—	July 27, 2014	Haleakala	Pan-STARRS 1	·	2.1 km	MPC · JPL
691220	2014 OS_{325}	—	June 27, 2014	Haleakala	Pan-STARRS 1	·	2.0 km	MPC · JPL
691221	2014 OU_{330}	—	June 25, 2014	Mount Lemmon	Mount Lemmon Survey	·	2.2 km	MPC · JPL
691222	2014 OT_{331}	—	December 25, 2011	Kitt Peak	Spacewatch	·	2.2 km	MPC · JPL
691223	2014 ON_{332}	—	September 23, 2011	Haleakala	Pan-STARRS 1	MAS	640 m	MPC · JPL
691224	2014 OM_{333}	—	December 1, 2005	Kitt Peak	Spacewatch	EOS	1.7 km	MPC · JPL
691225	2014 OC_{335}	—	July 4, 2014	Haleakala	Pan-STARRS 1	·	680 m	MPC · JPL
691226	2014 OG_{335}	—	November 15, 2010	Mount Lemmon	Mount Lemmon Survey	LUT	3.6 km	MPC · JPL
691227	2014 OW_{335}	—	June 30, 2014	Haleakala	Pan-STARRS 1	·	2.2 km	MPC · JPL
691228	2014 OK_{336}	—	May 9, 2013	Haleakala	Pan-STARRS 1	EOS	1.6 km	MPC · JPL
691229	2014 OS_{336}	—	July 30, 2014	Haleakala	Pan-STARRS 1	VER	2.3 km	MPC · JPL
691230	2014 OX_{339}	—	April 11, 2008	Mount Lemmon	Mount Lemmon Survey	·	1.4 km	MPC · JPL
691231	2014 OZ_{341}	—	November 19, 2006	Kitt Peak	Spacewatch	·	1.7 km	MPC · JPL
691232	2014 OO_{342}	—	March 11, 2008	Mount Lemmon	Mount Lemmon Survey	·	1.8 km	MPC · JPL
691233	2014 OX_{344}	—	March 19, 2013	Haleakala	Pan-STARRS 1	·	1.3 km	MPC · JPL
691234	2014 OJ_{345}	—	July 27, 2014	Haleakala	Pan-STARRS 1	·	2.5 km	MPC · JPL
691235	2014 OR_{345}	—	October 24, 2011	Haleakala	Pan-STARRS 1	·	520 m	MPC · JPL
691236	2014 OZ_{345}	—	December 29, 2005	Kitt Peak	Spacewatch	VER	2.2 km	MPC · JPL
691237	2014 OC_{346}	—	January 21, 2012	Kitt Peak	Spacewatch	·	2.4 km	MPC · JPL
691238	2014 OG_{346}	—	July 2, 2014	Haleakala	Pan-STARRS 1	·	2.3 km	MPC · JPL
691239	2014 OH_{346}	—	July 4, 2014	Haleakala	Pan-STARRS 1	·	2.3 km	MPC · JPL
691240	2014 OK_{346}	—	July 4, 2014	Haleakala	Pan-STARRS 1	·	2.0 km	MPC · JPL
691241	2014 OE_{348}	—	July 28, 2014	Haleakala	Pan-STARRS 1	·	2.2 km	MPC · JPL
691242	2014 OC_{350}	—	September 10, 2007	Kitt Peak	Spacewatch	·	820 m	MPC · JPL
691243	2014 OL_{351}	—	February 3, 2006	Mauna Kea	P. A. Wiegert, R. Rasmussen	·	2.7 km	MPC · JPL
691244	2014 OG_{352}	—	July 28, 2014	Haleakala	Pan-STARRS 1	·	2.0 km	MPC · JPL
691245	2014 OX_{352}	—	October 19, 2011	Mount Lemmon	Mount Lemmon Survey	·	700 m	MPC · JPL
691246	2014 OA_{353}	—	July 28, 2014	Haleakala	Pan-STARRS 1	·	2.3 km	MPC · JPL
691247	2014 OJ_{357}	—	March 18, 2013	Kitt Peak	Spacewatch	·	1.5 km	MPC · JPL
691248	2014 OO_{359}	—	July 28, 2014	Haleakala	Pan-STARRS 1	·	1.4 km	MPC · JPL
691249	2014 OD_{361}	—	March 12, 2013	Mount Lemmon	Mount Lemmon Survey	·	1.9 km	MPC · JPL
691250	2014 OB_{362}	—	October 12, 2010	Mount Lemmon	Mount Lemmon Survey	KOR	1.0 km	MPC · JPL
691251	2014 OL_{362}	—	September 24, 2009	Mount Lemmon	Mount Lemmon Survey	THM	2.0 km	MPC · JPL
691252	2014 OQ_{363}	—	July 25, 2014	Haleakala	Pan-STARRS 1	·	2.4 km	MPC · JPL
691253	2014 OF_{365}	—	July 30, 2014	Haleakala	Pan-STARRS 1	·	1.5 km	MPC · JPL
691254	2014 OZ_{365}	—	September 15, 2010	Kitt Peak	Spacewatch	·	1.8 km	MPC · JPL
691255	2014 OV_{366}	—	September 17, 2009	Mount Lemmon	Mount Lemmon Survey	VER	2.2 km	MPC · JPL
691256	2014 OA_{368}	—	October 28, 2010	Mount Lemmon	Mount Lemmon Survey	·	1.3 km	MPC · JPL
691257	2014 OC_{368}	—	February 15, 2012	Haleakala	Pan-STARRS 1	TIR	1.9 km	MPC · JPL
691258	2014 OF_{374}	—	May 31, 2014	Haleakala	Pan-STARRS 1	H	330 m	MPC · JPL
691259	2014 OZ_{374}	—	July 3, 2014	Haleakala	Pan-STARRS 1	·	620 m	MPC · JPL
691260	2014 OR_{375}	—	December 14, 2010	Mount Lemmon	Mount Lemmon Survey	HYG	2.2 km	MPC · JPL
691261	2014 OK_{376}	—	July 25, 2014	Haleakala	Pan-STARRS 1	·	1.7 km	MPC · JPL
691262	2014 OO_{376}	—	September 15, 2009	Kitt Peak	Spacewatch	·	2.2 km	MPC · JPL
691263	2014 OG_{378}	—	September 15, 2009	Kitt Peak	Spacewatch	·	2.4 km	MPC · JPL
691264	2014 OC_{379}	—	June 28, 2014	Haleakala	Pan-STARRS 1	THM	1.9 km	MPC · JPL
691265	2014 OB_{382}	—	November 7, 2005	Mauna Kea	A. Boattini	·	2.6 km	MPC · JPL
691266	2014 OX_{386}	—	June 2, 2014	Mount Lemmon	Mount Lemmon Survey	·	2.3 km	MPC · JPL
691267	2014 OP_{387}	—	April 1, 2013	Mount Lemmon	Mount Lemmon Survey	·	2.2 km	MPC · JPL
691268	2014 OR_{387}	—	March 19, 2013	Haleakala	Pan-STARRS 1	·	2.0 km	MPC · JPL
691269	2014 OE_{388}	—	July 6, 2014	Haleakala	Pan-STARRS 1	·	2.3 km	MPC · JPL
691270	2014 OA_{399}	—	December 21, 2006	Kitt Peak	L. H. Wasserman, M. W. Buie	KOR	1.0 km	MPC · JPL
691271	2014 OH_{401}	—	July 1, 2008	Kitt Peak	Spacewatch	·	2.6 km	MPC · JPL
691272	2014 OC_{402}	—	November 8, 2010	Mount Lemmon	Mount Lemmon Survey	·	2.0 km	MPC · JPL
691273	2014 OH_{403}	—	October 16, 2009	Mount Lemmon	Mount Lemmon Survey	·	1.8 km	MPC · JPL
691274	2014 ON_{403}	—	September 15, 2009	Kitt Peak	Spacewatch	·	2.2 km	MPC · JPL
691275	2014 OS_{403}	—	November 3, 2010	Mount Lemmon	Mount Lemmon Survey	·	1.8 km	MPC · JPL
691276	2014 OH_{404}	—	July 25, 2014	Haleakala	Pan-STARRS 1	·	2.1 km	MPC · JPL
691277	2014 OK_{404}	—	August 25, 2003	Cerro Tololo	Deep Ecliptic Survey	THM	1.5 km	MPC · JPL
691278	2014 OE_{406}	—	July 25, 2014	Haleakala	Pan-STARRS 1	WIT	830 m	MPC · JPL
691279	2014 OC_{407}	—	September 28, 2009	Kitt Peak	Spacewatch	HYG	2.3 km	MPC · JPL
691280	2014 OT_{408}	—	February 3, 2012	Haleakala	Pan-STARRS 1	HYG	2.3 km	MPC · JPL
691281	2014 OV_{408}	—	July 25, 2014	Haleakala	Pan-STARRS 1	·	800 m	MPC · JPL
691282	2014 OY_{409}	—	July 25, 2014	Haleakala	Pan-STARRS 1	VER	2.0 km	MPC · JPL
691283	2014 OO_{410}	—	July 4, 2014	Haleakala	Pan-STARRS 1	·	2.4 km	MPC · JPL
691284	2014 OX_{412}	—	January 2, 2011	Mount Lemmon	Mount Lemmon Survey	·	2.4 km	MPC · JPL
691285	2014 OZ_{412}	—	July 29, 2014	Haleakala	Pan-STARRS 1	·	2.2 km	MPC · JPL
691286	2014 OJ_{413}	—	July 30, 2014	Kitt Peak	Spacewatch	THM	1.7 km	MPC · JPL
691287	2014 OU_{413}	—	July 30, 2014	Haleakala	Pan-STARRS 1	WIT	750 m	MPC · JPL
691288	2014 OX_{414}	—	July 31, 2014	Haleakala	Pan-STARRS 1	·	1.9 km	MPC · JPL
691289	2014 OA_{415}	—	May 25, 2006	Kitt Peak	Spacewatch	·	950 m	MPC · JPL
691290	2014 OE_{415}	—	July 31, 2014	Haleakala	Pan-STARRS 1	VER	2.3 km	MPC · JPL
691291	2014 OO_{415}	—	July 25, 2014	Haleakala	Pan-STARRS 1	·	1.6 km	MPC · JPL
691292	2014 OQ_{415}	—	July 29, 2014	Haleakala	Pan-STARRS 1	EOS	1.5 km	MPC · JPL
691293	2014 OV_{415}	—	July 30, 2014	Kitt Peak	Spacewatch	THM	1.8 km	MPC · JPL
691294	2014 OB_{417}	—	July 31, 2014	Haleakala	Pan-STARRS 1	ELF	2.8 km	MPC · JPL
691295	2014 OE_{417}	—	July 30, 2014	Kitt Peak	Spacewatch	EUP	2.7 km	MPC · JPL
691296	2014 OM_{417}	—	July 29, 2014	Haleakala	Pan-STARRS 1	·	2.2 km	MPC · JPL
691297	2014 OG_{419}	—	July 31, 2014	Haleakala	Pan-STARRS 1	T_{j} (2.99) · 3:2	4.0 km	MPC · JPL
691298	2014 OD_{432}	—	July 25, 2014	Haleakala	Pan-STARRS 1	·	960 m	MPC · JPL
691299	2014 OQ_{432}	—	July 27, 2014	Haleakala	Pan-STARRS 1	V	430 m	MPC · JPL
691300	2014 OS_{432}	—	July 25, 2014	Haleakala	Pan-STARRS 1	·	2.2 km	MPC · JPL

== 691301–691400 ==
back to top

Designation			Discovery			Properties		Ref
Permanent	Provisional	Named after	Date	Site	Discoverer(s)	Category	Diam.	Ref
691301	2014 OP_{435}	—	July 28, 2014	Haleakala	Pan-STARRS 1	KOR	970 m	MPC · JPL
691302	2014 OU_{435}	—	July 27, 2014	Haleakala	Pan-STARRS 1	·	1.9 km	MPC · JPL
691303	2014 OX_{435}	—	July 25, 2014	Haleakala	Pan-STARRS 1	VER	2.3 km	MPC · JPL
691304	2014 OE_{436}	—	July 29, 2014	Haleakala	Pan-STARRS 1	·	2.1 km	MPC · JPL
691305	2014 OA_{437}	—	July 28, 2014	Haleakala	Pan-STARRS 1	ELF	3.0 km	MPC · JPL
691306	2014 OP_{437}	—	July 30, 2014	Kitt Peak	Spacewatch	·	2.3 km	MPC · JPL
691307	2014 OE_{438}	—	July 28, 2014	Haleakala	Pan-STARRS 1	·	2.5 km	MPC · JPL
691308	2014 OV_{438}	—	July 25, 2014	Haleakala	Pan-STARRS 1	·	1.9 km	MPC · JPL
691309	2014 OK_{439}	—	July 28, 2014	Haleakala	Pan-STARRS 1	·	1.9 km	MPC · JPL
691310	2014 OB_{440}	—	July 29, 2014	Haleakala	Pan-STARRS 1	·	2.1 km	MPC · JPL
691311	2014 OL_{445}	—	July 28, 2014	Haleakala	Pan-STARRS 1	·	2.4 km	MPC · JPL
691312	2014 OW_{446}	—	July 28, 2014	Haleakala	Pan-STARRS 1	·	2.1 km	MPC · JPL
691313	2014 OD_{450}	—	August 16, 2009	Kitt Peak	Spacewatch	·	2.6 km	MPC · JPL
691314	2014 OJ_{453}	—	July 31, 2014	Haleakala	Pan-STARRS 1	·	920 m	MPC · JPL
691315	2014 OW_{455}	—	July 28, 2014	Haleakala	Pan-STARRS 1	·	670 m	MPC · JPL
691316	2014 OP_{458}	—	October 23, 2011	Mount Lemmon	Mount Lemmon Survey	·	510 m	MPC · JPL
691317	2014 OH_{462}	—	July 26, 2014	Haleakala	Pan-STARRS 1	·	2.0 km	MPC · JPL
691318	2014 OW_{469}	—	July 25, 2014	Haleakala	Pan-STARRS 1	·	890 m	MPC · JPL
691319	2014 OD_{470}	—	July 28, 2014	Haleakala	Pan-STARRS 1	PHO	670 m	MPC · JPL
691320	2014 OK_{470}	—	July 25, 2014	Haleakala	Pan-STARRS 1	·	2.1 km	MPC · JPL
691321	2014 OY_{477}	—	July 25, 2014	Haleakala	Pan-STARRS 1	·	2.8 km	MPC · JPL
691322	2014 PX	—	January 10, 2008	Mount Lemmon	Mount Lemmon Survey	H	390 m	MPC · JPL
691323	2014 PF_{5}	—	June 27, 2014	Haleakala	Pan-STARRS 1	·	2.2 km	MPC · JPL
691324	2014 PJ_{6}	—	June 2, 2014	Mount Lemmon	Mount Lemmon Survey	·	2.6 km	MPC · JPL
691325	2014 PK_{8}	—	August 4, 2014	Haleakala	Pan-STARRS 1	·	2.4 km	MPC · JPL
691326	2014 PB_{10}	—	August 4, 2014	Haleakala	Pan-STARRS 1	·	2.2 km	MPC · JPL
691327	2014 PD_{10}	—	July 28, 2014	Haleakala	Pan-STARRS 1	·	1.0 km	MPC · JPL
691328	2014 PP_{10}	—	January 26, 2006	Kitt Peak	Spacewatch	·	2.4 km	MPC · JPL
691329	2014 PC_{12}	—	September 20, 2009	Kitt Peak	Spacewatch	THM	1.7 km	MPC · JPL
691330	2014 PO_{12}	—	January 1, 2009	Kitt Peak	Spacewatch	·	850 m	MPC · JPL
691331	2014 PZ_{13}	—	February 3, 2012	Haleakala	Pan-STARRS 1	·	2.1 km	MPC · JPL
691332	2014 PJ_{17}	—	July 27, 2014	ESA OGS	ESA OGS	·	1.9 km	MPC · JPL
691333	2014 PQ_{17}	—	October 17, 2010	Mount Lemmon	Mount Lemmon Survey	·	1.6 km	MPC · JPL
691334	2014 PN_{18}	—	October 11, 2009	Mount Lemmon	Mount Lemmon Survey	·	2.1 km	MPC · JPL
691335	2014 PQ_{20}	—	November 4, 2007	Mount Lemmon	Mount Lemmon Survey	·	760 m	MPC · JPL
691336	2014 PK_{21}	—	July 26, 2014	ESA OGS	ESA OGS	·	840 m	MPC · JPL
691337	2014 PR_{24}	—	February 25, 2011	Mount Lemmon	Mount Lemmon Survey	·	2.3 km	MPC · JPL
691338	2014 PQ_{25}	—	August 28, 2005	Kitt Peak	Spacewatch	·	1.6 km	MPC · JPL
691339	2014 PW_{29}	—	December 23, 2006	Mount Lemmon	Mount Lemmon Survey	MRX	1.2 km	MPC · JPL
691340	2014 PC_{31}	—	January 25, 2009	Kitt Peak	Spacewatch	·	650 m	MPC · JPL
691341	2014 PV_{33}	—	June 23, 2014	Mount Lemmon	Mount Lemmon Survey	·	2.9 km	MPC · JPL
691342	2014 PR_{35}	—	July 25, 2014	Haleakala	Pan-STARRS 1	·	2.7 km	MPC · JPL
691343	2014 PY_{36}	—	June 23, 2014	Mount Lemmon	Mount Lemmon Survey	·	2.5 km	MPC · JPL
691344	2014 PJ_{37}	—	September 27, 2005	Kitt Peak	Spacewatch	·	1.6 km	MPC · JPL
691345	2014 PM_{39}	—	June 28, 2014	Mount Lemmon	Mount Lemmon Survey	·	2.4 km	MPC · JPL
691346	2014 PX_{40}	—	July 7, 2014	Haleakala	Pan-STARRS 1	HOF	1.9 km	MPC · JPL
691347	2014 PN_{42}	—	October 21, 2009	Kitt Peak	Spacewatch	·	2.3 km	MPC · JPL
691348	2014 PY_{42}	—	April 9, 2003	Kitt Peak	Spacewatch	·	720 m	MPC · JPL
691349	2014 PD_{45}	—	September 10, 2007	Mount Lemmon	Mount Lemmon Survey	·	900 m	MPC · JPL
691350	2014 PG_{46}	—	July 25, 2014	Haleakala	Pan-STARRS 1	·	2.3 km	MPC · JPL
691351	2014 PC_{47}	—	January 27, 2007	Mount Lemmon	Mount Lemmon Survey	·	2.5 km	MPC · JPL
691352	2014 PL_{49}	—	August 4, 2014	Haleakala	Pan-STARRS 1	·	2.2 km	MPC · JPL
691353	2014 PN_{49}	—	September 19, 2009	Kitt Peak	Spacewatch	·	2.8 km	MPC · JPL
691354	2014 PO_{49}	—	July 25, 2014	Haleakala	Pan-STARRS 1	(1118)	2.6 km	MPC · JPL
691355	2014 PS_{50}	—	August 4, 2014	Haleakala	Pan-STARRS 1	·	2.8 km	MPC · JPL
691356	2014 PT_{52}	—	September 18, 2009	Mount Lemmon	Mount Lemmon Survey	·	1.6 km	MPC · JPL
691357	2014 PO_{53}	—	July 28, 2014	Haleakala	Pan-STARRS 1	·	2.5 km	MPC · JPL
691358	2014 PX_{54}	—	April 21, 2013	Mount Lemmon	Mount Lemmon Survey	HYG	2.5 km	MPC · JPL
691359	2014 PQ_{55}	—	July 7, 2014	Haleakala	Pan-STARRS 1	·	600 m	MPC · JPL
691360	2014 PO_{56}	—	July 25, 2003	Palomar	NEAT	·	2.7 km	MPC · JPL
691361	2014 PN_{62}	—	January 20, 2009	Kitt Peak	Spacewatch	·	710 m	MPC · JPL
691362	2014 PS_{67}	—	December 31, 2008	Kitt Peak	Spacewatch	·	900 m	MPC · JPL
691363	2014 PU_{69}	—	August 27, 2001	Anderson Mesa	LONEOS	·	610 m	MPC · JPL
691364	2014 PX_{72}	—	May 16, 2013	Haleakala	Pan-STARRS 1	LIX	3.0 km	MPC · JPL
691365	2014 PR_{73}	—	August 3, 2014	Haleakala	Pan-STARRS 1	·	1.8 km	MPC · JPL
691366	2014 PS_{73}	—	August 3, 2014	Haleakala	Pan-STARRS 1	V	510 m	MPC · JPL
691367	2014 PZ_{73}	—	October 9, 2005	Kitt Peak	Spacewatch	HOF	2.3 km	MPC · JPL
691368	2014 PC_{77}	—	August 4, 2014	Haleakala	Pan-STARRS 1	·	2.4 km	MPC · JPL
691369	2014 PK_{79}	—	September 22, 2009	Kitt Peak	Spacewatch	·	2.6 km	MPC · JPL
691370	2014 PP_{79}	—	February 14, 2012	Haleakala	Pan-STARRS 1	·	1.7 km	MPC · JPL
691371	2014 PL_{80}	—	July 28, 2014	Haleakala	Pan-STARRS 1	MAS	580 m	MPC · JPL
691372	2014 PV_{82}	—	August 6, 2014	Haleakala	Pan-STARRS 1	V	610 m	MPC · JPL
691373	2014 PU_{84}	—	August 4, 2014	Haleakala	Pan-STARRS 1	·	1.2 km	MPC · JPL
691374	2014 PJ_{89}	—	August 3, 2014	Haleakala	Pan-STARRS 1	URS	2.4 km	MPC · JPL
691375	2014 PO_{89}	—	August 3, 2014	Haleakala	Pan-STARRS 1	·	700 m	MPC · JPL
691376	2014 PD_{90}	—	August 14, 2014	Haleakala	Pan-STARRS 1	EOS	1.5 km	MPC · JPL
691377	2014 PG_{90}	—	August 15, 2014	Haleakala	Pan-STARRS 1	·	2.2 km	MPC · JPL
691378	2014 PR_{90}	—	August 15, 2014	Haleakala	Pan-STARRS 1	KOR	1.1 km	MPC · JPL
691379	2014 PT_{93}	—	August 15, 2014	Haleakala	Pan-STARRS 1	·	2.2 km	MPC · JPL
691380	2014 PA_{99}	—	August 3, 2014	Haleakala	Pan-STARRS 1	VER	1.9 km	MPC · JPL
691381	2014 PF_{100}	—	August 3, 2014	Haleakala	Pan-STARRS 1	·	2.0 km	MPC · JPL
691382	2014 PN_{101}	—	August 3, 2014	Haleakala	Pan-STARRS 1	KOR	1 km	MPC · JPL
691383	2014 PU_{101}	—	August 5, 2014	Haleakala	Pan-STARRS 1	·	2.3 km	MPC · JPL
691384	2014 PR_{105}	—	August 3, 2014	Haleakala	Pan-STARRS 1	URS	2.2 km	MPC · JPL
691385	2014 QH_{5}	—	March 4, 2013	Haleakala	Pan-STARRS 1	EUN	1.1 km	MPC · JPL
691386	2014 QU_{5}	—	October 14, 2010	Mount Lemmon	Mount Lemmon Survey	·	2.9 km	MPC · JPL
691387	2014 QK_{6}	—	August 18, 2014	Haleakala	Pan-STARRS 1	·	2.6 km	MPC · JPL
691388	2014 QX_{7}	—	July 3, 2014	Haleakala	Pan-STARRS 1	EUN	710 m	MPC · JPL
691389	2014 QQ_{8}	—	October 13, 2010	Mount Lemmon	Mount Lemmon Survey	·	3.0 km	MPC · JPL
691390	2014 QY_{10}	—	August 18, 2014	Haleakala	Pan-STARRS 1	·	2.5 km	MPC · JPL
691391	2014 QF_{12}	—	July 5, 2014	Haleakala	Pan-STARRS 1	·	2.1 km	MPC · JPL
691392	2014 QL_{13}	—	August 18, 2014	Haleakala	Pan-STARRS 1	·	2.1 km	MPC · JPL
691393	2014 QV_{13}	—	August 18, 2014	Haleakala	Pan-STARRS 1	·	2.4 km	MPC · JPL
691394	2014 QA_{14}	—	August 18, 2014	Haleakala	Pan-STARRS 1	·	2.3 km	MPC · JPL
691395	2014 QY_{14}	—	January 20, 2012	Haleakala	Pan-STARRS 1	·	3.1 km	MPC · JPL
691396	2014 QF_{15}	—	August 30, 2005	Kitt Peak	Spacewatch	·	1.8 km	MPC · JPL
691397	2014 QU_{15}	—	June 7, 2013	Haleakala	Pan-STARRS 1	·	3.0 km	MPC · JPL
691398	2014 QE_{16}	—	December 6, 2010	Kitt Peak	Spacewatch	EOS	1.6 km	MPC · JPL
691399	2014 QT_{16}	—	May 8, 2013	Haleakala	Pan-STARRS 1	·	2.2 km	MPC · JPL
691400	2014 QQ_{17}	—	September 30, 2009	Mount Lemmon	Mount Lemmon Survey	·	3.2 km	MPC · JPL

== 691401–691500 ==
back to top

Designation			Discovery			Properties		Ref
Permanent	Provisional	Named after	Date	Site	Discoverer(s)	Category	Diam.	Ref
691401	2014 QU_{17}	—	June 9, 2014	Mount Lemmon	Mount Lemmon Survey	·	1.4 km	MPC · JPL
691402	2014 QT_{18}	—	September 18, 2003	Kitt Peak	Spacewatch	·	2.0 km	MPC · JPL
691403	2014 QM_{20}	—	September 15, 2009	Kitt Peak	Spacewatch	EOS	1.5 km	MPC · JPL
691404	2014 QR_{23}	—	October 19, 2003	Socorro	LINEAR	·	3.2 km	MPC · JPL
691405	2014 QU_{23}	—	September 18, 2003	Kitt Peak	Spacewatch	·	2.4 km	MPC · JPL
691406	2014 QO_{24}	—	February 28, 2012	Haleakala	Pan-STARRS 1	·	2.8 km	MPC · JPL
691407	2014 QM_{26}	—	October 21, 2003	Kitt Peak	Spacewatch	·	2.2 km	MPC · JPL
691408	2014 QW_{27}	—	September 29, 2009	Mount Lemmon	Mount Lemmon Survey	·	2.3 km	MPC · JPL
691409	2014 QM_{29}	—	August 18, 2014	Haleakala	Pan-STARRS 1	·	1.8 km	MPC · JPL
691410	2014 QW_{29}	—	October 10, 2010	Palomar	Palomar Transient Factory	·	1.1 km	MPC · JPL
691411	2014 QU_{30}	—	August 18, 2014	Haleakala	Pan-STARRS 1	·	2.5 km	MPC · JPL
691412	2014 QJ_{32}	—	August 20, 2014	Haleakala	Pan-STARRS 1	H	410 m	MPC · JPL
691413	2014 QQ_{36}	—	November 27, 2010	Mount Lemmon	Mount Lemmon Survey	·	1.3 km	MPC · JPL
691414	2014 QH_{37}	—	June 2, 2014	Haleakala	Pan-STARRS 1	·	670 m	MPC · JPL
691415	2014 QV_{38}	—	August 18, 2014	Haleakala	Pan-STARRS 1	URS	2.9 km	MPC · JPL
691416	2014 QY_{38}	—	September 16, 2009	Kitt Peak	Spacewatch	·	2.2 km	MPC · JPL
691417	2014 QV_{40}	—	July 31, 2014	Haleakala	Pan-STARRS 1	·	2.3 km	MPC · JPL
691418	2014 QH_{43}	—	July 26, 2014	Haleakala	Pan-STARRS 1	·	740 m	MPC · JPL
691419	2014 QO_{43}	—	July 28, 2014	Haleakala	Pan-STARRS 1	·	1.9 km	MPC · JPL
691420	2014 QV_{44}	—	February 13, 2007	Mount Lemmon	Mount Lemmon Survey	·	2.1 km	MPC · JPL
691421	2014 QX_{45}	—	January 19, 2012	Haleakala	Pan-STARRS 1	·	2.1 km	MPC · JPL
691422	2014 QY_{46}	—	July 2, 2014	Haleakala	Pan-STARRS 1	HYG	2.1 km	MPC · JPL
691423	2014 QW_{48}	—	November 25, 2005	Kitt Peak	Spacewatch	·	1.7 km	MPC · JPL
691424	2014 QL_{49}	—	August 16, 2014	Haleakala	Pan-STARRS 1	·	500 m	MPC · JPL
691425	2014 QP_{50}	—	January 7, 2006	Kitt Peak	Spacewatch	·	2.6 km	MPC · JPL
691426	2014 QK_{51}	—	July 7, 2014	Haleakala	Pan-STARRS 1	·	790 m	MPC · JPL
691427	2014 QN_{51}	—	December 2, 2005	Mount Lemmon	Mount Lemmon Survey	·	1.3 km	MPC · JPL
691428	2014 QL_{52}	—	February 17, 2007	Mount Lemmon	Mount Lemmon Survey	·	1.4 km	MPC · JPL
691429	2014 QK_{57}	—	December 3, 2010	Mount Lemmon	Mount Lemmon Survey	·	1.9 km	MPC · JPL
691430	2014 QC_{58}	—	April 12, 2013	Haleakala	Pan-STARRS 1	·	2.0 km	MPC · JPL
691431	2014 QS_{58}	—	February 15, 2013	Haleakala	Pan-STARRS 1	V	420 m	MPC · JPL
691432	2014 QD_{61}	—	September 19, 2007	Mount Lemmon	Mount Lemmon Survey	·	770 m	MPC · JPL
691433	2014 QF_{62}	—	February 4, 2012	Haleakala	Pan-STARRS 1	·	2.4 km	MPC · JPL
691434	2014 QL_{62}	—	January 1, 2012	Mount Lemmon	Mount Lemmon Survey	·	1.4 km	MPC · JPL
691435	2014 QB_{63}	—	February 25, 2007	Kitt Peak	Spacewatch	·	1.7 km	MPC · JPL
691436	2014 QE_{63}	—	July 28, 2014	Haleakala	Pan-STARRS 1	·	2.2 km	MPC · JPL
691437	2014 QH_{63}	—	February 11, 2012	Mount Lemmon	Mount Lemmon Survey	EOS	1.4 km	MPC · JPL
691438	2014 QP_{64}	—	July 1, 2014	Haleakala	Pan-STARRS 1	·	2.1 km	MPC · JPL
691439	2014 QA_{66}	—	April 16, 2013	Haleakala	Pan-STARRS 1	EOS	1.5 km	MPC · JPL
691440	2014 QA_{67}	—	December 4, 2010	Mount Lemmon	Mount Lemmon Survey	·	2.6 km	MPC · JPL
691441	2014 QO_{68}	—	August 20, 2014	Haleakala	Pan-STARRS 1	·	2.6 km	MPC · JPL
691442	2014 QR_{68}	—	July 1, 2014	Haleakala	Pan-STARRS 1	·	2.5 km	MPC · JPL
691443	2014 QF_{70}	—	June 3, 2014	Haleakala	Pan-STARRS 1	·	1.3 km	MPC · JPL
691444	2014 QJ_{70}	—	August 20, 2014	Haleakala	Pan-STARRS 1	·	1.5 km	MPC · JPL
691445	2014 QA_{71}	—	August 20, 2014	Haleakala	Pan-STARRS 1	·	2.4 km	MPC · JPL
691446	2014 QO_{71}	—	March 13, 2012	Mount Lemmon	Mount Lemmon Survey	·	2.2 km	MPC · JPL
691447	2014 QP_{72}	—	July 1, 2014	Haleakala	Pan-STARRS 1	·	1.9 km	MPC · JPL
691448	2014 QX_{72}	—	August 20, 2014	Haleakala	Pan-STARRS 1	EOS	1.7 km	MPC · JPL
691449	2014 QC_{73}	—	September 19, 2009	Kitt Peak	Spacewatch	VER	1.9 km	MPC · JPL
691450	2014 QE_{74}	—	November 9, 2004	Mauna Kea	Veillet, C.	·	2.6 km	MPC · JPL
691451	2014 QH_{74}	—	September 15, 2009	Kitt Peak	Spacewatch	·	3.0 km	MPC · JPL
691452	2014 QA_{75}	—	September 21, 2009	Catalina	CSS	·	2.0 km	MPC · JPL
691453	2014 QE_{75}	—	September 15, 2009	Kitt Peak	Spacewatch	·	2.0 km	MPC · JPL
691454	2014 QL_{75}	—	July 1, 2014	Haleakala	Pan-STARRS 1	·	2.6 km	MPC · JPL
691455	2014 QZ_{75}	—	August 20, 2014	Haleakala	Pan-STARRS 1	VER	2.1 km	MPC · JPL
691456	2014 QC_{76}	—	August 20, 2014	Haleakala	Pan-STARRS 1	·	2.7 km	MPC · JPL
691457	2014 QA_{77}	—	January 7, 2006	Kitt Peak	Spacewatch	·	2.2 km	MPC · JPL
691458	2014 QW_{77}	—	December 28, 2005	Mount Lemmon	Mount Lemmon Survey	EOS	1.1 km	MPC · JPL
691459	2014 QL_{78}	—	October 18, 2004	Kitt Peak	Deep Ecliptic Survey	·	2.6 km	MPC · JPL
691460	2014 QA_{80}	—	January 2, 2012	Mount Lemmon	Mount Lemmon Survey	WIT	750 m	MPC · JPL
691461	2014 QP_{80}	—	June 3, 2014	Haleakala	Pan-STARRS 1	·	2.9 km	MPC · JPL
691462	2014 QM_{81}	—	August 20, 2014	Haleakala	Pan-STARRS 1	EOS	1.3 km	MPC · JPL
691463	2014 QT_{81}	—	April 19, 2013	Haleakala	Pan-STARRS 1	·	2.6 km	MPC · JPL
691464	2014 QB_{82}	—	August 20, 2014	Haleakala	Pan-STARRS 1	PHO	730 m	MPC · JPL
691465	2014 QS_{82}	—	January 1, 2012	Mount Lemmon	Mount Lemmon Survey	·	2.8 km	MPC · JPL
691466	2014 QT_{83}	—	August 20, 2014	Haleakala	Pan-STARRS 1	·	740 m	MPC · JPL
691467	2014 QV_{85}	—	July 5, 2014	Haleakala	Pan-STARRS 1	·	2.4 km	MPC · JPL
691468	2014 QW_{85}	—	August 20, 2014	Haleakala	Pan-STARRS 1	·	2.8 km	MPC · JPL
691469	2014 QY_{85}	—	June 3, 2014	Haleakala	Pan-STARRS 1	·	2.6 km	MPC · JPL
691470	2014 QV_{87}	—	August 20, 2014	Haleakala	Pan-STARRS 1	·	2.6 km	MPC · JPL
691471	2014 QG_{88}	—	June 24, 2014	Haleakala	Pan-STARRS 1	·	2.6 km	MPC · JPL
691472	2014 QU_{88}	—	February 27, 2012	Haleakala	Pan-STARRS 1	VER	1.9 km	MPC · JPL
691473	2014 QJ_{89}	—	November 25, 2011	Haleakala	Pan-STARRS 1	·	1.1 km	MPC · JPL
691474	2014 QF_{90}	—	March 16, 2007	Kitt Peak	Spacewatch	·	2.4 km	MPC · JPL
691475	2014 QJ_{92}	—	June 7, 2013	Haleakala	Pan-STARRS 1	VER	2.0 km	MPC · JPL
691476	2014 QY_{92}	—	February 27, 2012	Haleakala	Pan-STARRS 1	·	2.3 km	MPC · JPL
691477	2014 QZ_{95}	—	August 20, 2014	Haleakala	Pan-STARRS 1	·	2.2 km	MPC · JPL
691478	2014 QU_{96}	—	April 18, 2009	Siding Spring	SSS	EUN	1.2 km	MPC · JPL
691479	2014 QT_{98}	—	June 23, 2014	Mount Lemmon	Mount Lemmon Survey	EUN	980 m	MPC · JPL
691480	2014 QC_{99}	—	January 27, 2006	Mount Lemmon	Mount Lemmon Survey	·	2.5 km	MPC · JPL
691481	2014 QW_{99}	—	September 19, 2003	Kitt Peak	Spacewatch	·	2.7 km	MPC · JPL
691482	2014 QJ_{101}	—	September 16, 2003	Kitt Peak	Spacewatch	VER	2.0 km	MPC · JPL
691483	2014 QZ_{101}	—	November 3, 2010	Kitt Peak	Spacewatch	·	1.9 km	MPC · JPL
691484	2014 QF_{102}	—	February 16, 2013	Mount Lemmon	Mount Lemmon Survey	·	710 m	MPC · JPL
691485	2014 QK_{102}	—	March 18, 2007	Kitt Peak	Spacewatch	·	2.4 km	MPC · JPL
691486	2014 QV_{102}	—	August 20, 2014	Haleakala	Pan-STARRS 1	PHO	620 m	MPC · JPL
691487	2014 QT_{103}	—	July 25, 2014	Haleakala	Pan-STARRS 1	·	2.4 km	MPC · JPL
691488	2014 QV_{103}	—	August 20, 2014	Haleakala	Pan-STARRS 1	·	1.3 km	MPC · JPL
691489	2014 QA_{105}	—	September 26, 2009	Kitt Peak	Spacewatch	·	2.5 km	MPC · JPL
691490	2014 QD_{107}	—	February 14, 2012	Haleakala	Pan-STARRS 1	·	2.5 km	MPC · JPL
691491	2014 QK_{107}	—	August 29, 2009	Kitt Peak	Spacewatch	·	1.9 km	MPC · JPL
691492	2014 QH_{108}	—	April 30, 2013	Mount Lemmon	Mount Lemmon Survey	EOS	1.7 km	MPC · JPL
691493	2014 QS_{111}	—	August 20, 2014	Haleakala	Pan-STARRS 1	·	1.7 km	MPC · JPL
691494	2014 QB_{114}	—	June 30, 2014	Haleakala	Pan-STARRS 1	·	2.6 km	MPC · JPL
691495	2014 QF_{114}	—	August 18, 2014	Mayhill-ISON	L. Elenin	·	1.1 km	MPC · JPL
691496	2014 QB_{115}	—	September 19, 2003	Kitt Peak	Spacewatch	·	2.5 km	MPC · JPL
691497	2014 QF_{115}	—	March 16, 2012	Mount Lemmon	Mount Lemmon Survey	·	2.3 km	MPC · JPL
691498	2014 QB_{117}	—	September 22, 2009	Kitt Peak	Spacewatch	·	2.3 km	MPC · JPL
691499	2014 QH_{120}	—	July 28, 2014	Haleakala	Pan-STARRS 1	·	2.3 km	MPC · JPL
691500	2014 QQ_{120}	—	August 20, 2014	Haleakala	Pan-STARRS 1	·	2.5 km	MPC · JPL

== 691501–691600 ==
back to top

Designation			Discovery			Properties		Ref
Permanent	Provisional	Named after	Date	Site	Discoverer(s)	Category	Diam.	Ref
691501	2014 QM_{123}	—	October 13, 2010	Mount Lemmon	Mount Lemmon Survey	·	1.5 km	MPC · JPL
691502	2014 QA_{125}	—	August 20, 2014	Haleakala	Pan-STARRS 1	·	2.0 km	MPC · JPL
691503	2014 QH_{126}	—	February 3, 2012	Haleakala	Pan-STARRS 1	·	1.5 km	MPC · JPL
691504	2014 QN_{130}	—	August 20, 2014	Haleakala	Pan-STARRS 1	·	930 m	MPC · JPL
691505	2014 QX_{131}	—	August 20, 2014	Haleakala	Pan-STARRS 1	·	1.4 km	MPC · JPL
691506	2014 QF_{132}	—	August 20, 2014	Haleakala	Pan-STARRS 1	VER	1.9 km	MPC · JPL
691507	2014 QG_{132}	—	June 7, 2013	Haleakala	Pan-STARRS 1	·	1.5 km	MPC · JPL
691508	2014 QF_{133}	—	September 20, 2009	Mount Lemmon	Mount Lemmon Survey	·	1.4 km	MPC · JPL
691509	2014 QY_{133}	—	October 6, 2007	Kitt Peak	Spacewatch	MAS	610 m	MPC · JPL
691510	2014 QA_{134}	—	August 20, 2014	Haleakala	Pan-STARRS 1	·	1.1 km	MPC · JPL
691511	2014 QE_{134}	—	August 3, 2014	Haleakala	Pan-STARRS 1	·	2.3 km	MPC · JPL
691512	2014 QD_{136}	—	September 4, 2003	Kitt Peak	Spacewatch	·	2.5 km	MPC · JPL
691513	2014 QG_{138}	—	March 13, 2012	Mount Lemmon	Mount Lemmon Survey	(895)	2.6 km	MPC · JPL
691514	2014 QF_{140}	—	August 20, 2014	Haleakala	Pan-STARRS 1	·	800 m	MPC · JPL
691515	2014 QZ_{140}	—	August 20, 2014	Haleakala	Pan-STARRS 1	·	710 m	MPC · JPL
691516	2014 QT_{141}	—	August 20, 2014	Haleakala	Pan-STARRS 1	·	2.7 km	MPC · JPL
691517	2014 QE_{142}	—	July 31, 2014	Haleakala	Pan-STARRS 1	·	2.4 km	MPC · JPL
691518	2014 QV_{144}	—	August 20, 2014	Haleakala	Pan-STARRS 1	·	2.2 km	MPC · JPL
691519	2014 QY_{147}	—	August 5, 2014	Haleakala	Pan-STARRS 1	·	2.4 km	MPC · JPL
691520	2014 QJ_{150}	—	June 1, 2013	Mount Lemmon	Mount Lemmon Survey	KOR	1.1 km	MPC · JPL
691521	2014 QN_{152}	—	June 24, 2014	Haleakala	Pan-STARRS 1	·	3.4 km	MPC · JPL
691522	2014 QK_{154}	—	March 15, 2013	Mount Lemmon	Mount Lemmon Survey	·	1.9 km	MPC · JPL
691523	2014 QV_{154}	—	November 3, 2010	Catalina	CSS	·	1.9 km	MPC · JPL
691524	2014 QZ_{154}	—	June 27, 2014	Haleakala	Pan-STARRS 1	·	990 m	MPC · JPL
691525	2014 QA_{156}	—	April 10, 2013	Haleakala	Pan-STARRS 1	EOS	1.6 km	MPC · JPL
691526	2014 QB_{156}	—	October 6, 2005	Kitt Peak	Spacewatch	·	1.6 km	MPC · JPL
691527	2014 QD_{156}	—	November 18, 2006	Mount Lemmon	Mount Lemmon Survey	·	1.9 km	MPC · JPL
691528	2014 QH_{156}	—	November 17, 2004	Campo Imperatore	CINEOS	·	2.2 km	MPC · JPL
691529	2014 QY_{157}	—	April 13, 2013	Haleakala	Pan-STARRS 1	·	2.8 km	MPC · JPL
691530	2014 QN_{158}	—	June 29, 2014	Haleakala	Pan-STARRS 1	·	2.2 km	MPC · JPL
691531	2014 QL_{159}	—	October 9, 2009	Kitt Peak	Spacewatch	·	2.3 km	MPC · JPL
691532	2014 QS_{159}	—	May 12, 2013	Haleakala	Pan-STARRS 1	·	2.4 km	MPC · JPL
691533	2014 QH_{160}	—	August 22, 2014	Haleakala	Pan-STARRS 1	·	2.1 km	MPC · JPL
691534	2014 QH_{161}	—	July 30, 2014	Haleakala	Pan-STARRS 1	·	2.6 km	MPC · JPL
691535	2014 QK_{161}	—	May 4, 2013	Haleakala	Pan-STARRS 1	EOS	1.7 km	MPC · JPL
691536	2014 QQ_{163}	—	June 29, 2014	Haleakala	Pan-STARRS 1	LUT	3.3 km	MPC · JPL
691537	2014 QB_{165}	—	January 27, 2007	Mount Lemmon	Mount Lemmon Survey	·	2.2 km	MPC · JPL
691538	2014 QM_{166}	—	August 22, 2014	Haleakala	Pan-STARRS 1	·	470 m	MPC · JPL
691539	2014 QH_{167}	—	August 22, 2014	Haleakala	Pan-STARRS 1	·	2.9 km	MPC · JPL
691540	2014 QP_{176}	—	March 11, 2007	Mount Lemmon	Mount Lemmon Survey	KOR	1.2 km	MPC · JPL
691541	2014 QG_{178}	—	February 21, 2007	Kitt Peak	Spacewatch	·	1.9 km	MPC · JPL
691542	2014 QB_{180}	—	June 30, 2014	Haleakala	Pan-STARRS 1	·	1.9 km	MPC · JPL
691543	2014 QH_{180}	—	September 4, 2003	Kitt Peak	Spacewatch	·	3.1 km	MPC · JPL
691544	2014 QP_{180}	—	April 16, 2013	Cerro Tololo	DECam	·	1.8 km	MPC · JPL
691545	2014 QA_{181}	—	August 22, 2014	Haleakala	Pan-STARRS 1	·	2.3 km	MPC · JPL
691546	2014 QO_{182}	—	January 19, 2012	Haleakala	Pan-STARRS 1	·	1.7 km	MPC · JPL
691547	2014 QM_{183}	—	April 19, 2007	Mount Lemmon	Mount Lemmon Survey	·	2.2 km	MPC · JPL
691548	2014 QC_{184}	—	August 22, 2014	Haleakala	Pan-STARRS 1	·	2.0 km	MPC · JPL
691549	2014 QK_{184}	—	August 22, 2014	Haleakala	Pan-STARRS 1	·	1.3 km	MPC · JPL
691550	2014 QJ_{185}	—	September 3, 2005	Palomar	NEAT	·	2.2 km	MPC · JPL
691551	2014 QO_{185}	—	August 22, 2014	Haleakala	Pan-STARRS 1	·	1.6 km	MPC · JPL
691552	2014 QQ_{186}	—	January 18, 2009	Kitt Peak	Spacewatch	·	960 m	MPC · JPL
691553	2014 QL_{188}	—	September 18, 2009	Kitt Peak	Spacewatch	·	2.2 km	MPC · JPL
691554	2014 QH_{189}	—	April 15, 2013	Haleakala	Pan-STARRS 1	·	2.1 km	MPC · JPL
691555	2014 QN_{191}	—	August 17, 2009	Kitt Peak	Spacewatch	·	1.7 km	MPC · JPL
691556	2014 QU_{192}	—	September 22, 2009	Kitt Peak	Spacewatch	·	1.9 km	MPC · JPL
691557	2014 QC_{194}	—	February 28, 2012	Haleakala	Pan-STARRS 1	·	2.4 km	MPC · JPL
691558	2014 QW_{194}	—	September 17, 2003	Palomar	NEAT	·	3.0 km	MPC · JPL
691559	2014 QN_{195}	—	August 22, 2014	Haleakala	Pan-STARRS 1	·	2.3 km	MPC · JPL
691560	2014 QQ_{201}	—	January 30, 2012	Mount Lemmon	Mount Lemmon Survey	EUP	3.2 km	MPC · JPL
691561	2014 QV_{205}	—	October 17, 2003	Kitt Peak	Spacewatch	·	2.0 km	MPC · JPL
691562	2014 QX_{205}	—	March 26, 2008	Mount Lemmon	Mount Lemmon Survey	·	1.3 km	MPC · JPL
691563	2014 QK_{209}	—	March 1, 2008	Kitt Peak	Spacewatch	·	1.5 km	MPC · JPL
691564	2014 QM_{209}	—	March 9, 2005	Kitt Peak	Spacewatch	·	1.1 km	MPC · JPL
691565	2014 QU_{210}	—	January 30, 2006	Kitt Peak	Spacewatch	·	2.6 km	MPC · JPL
691566	2014 QA_{211}	—	June 24, 2014	Haleakala	Pan-STARRS 1	·	1.0 km	MPC · JPL
691567	2014 QC_{215}	—	July 28, 2014	Haleakala	Pan-STARRS 1	·	660 m	MPC · JPL
691568	2014 QL_{215}	—	August 22, 2014	Haleakala	Pan-STARRS 1	·	620 m	MPC · JPL
691569	2014 QT_{216}	—	September 26, 2003	Apache Point	SDSS Collaboration	·	1.1 km	MPC · JPL
691570	2014 QL_{220}	—	August 22, 2014	Haleakala	Pan-STARRS 1	·	2.1 km	MPC · JPL
691571	2014 QX_{220}	—	April 27, 2006	Cerro Tololo	Deep Ecliptic Survey	·	540 m	MPC · JPL
691572	2014 QZ_{220}	—	April 16, 2013	Haleakala	Pan-STARRS 1	·	2.2 km	MPC · JPL
691573	2014 QH_{221}	—	September 12, 2009	Kitt Peak	Spacewatch	·	2.1 km	MPC · JPL
691574	2014 QW_{222}	—	February 3, 2012	Haleakala	Pan-STARRS 1	·	1.5 km	MPC · JPL
691575	2014 QX_{222}	—	February 25, 2006	Kitt Peak	Spacewatch	·	2.3 km	MPC · JPL
691576	2014 QM_{225}	—	September 17, 2003	Kitt Peak	Spacewatch	·	2.5 km	MPC · JPL
691577	2014 QR_{229}	—	August 22, 2014	Haleakala	Pan-STARRS 1	·	2.5 km	MPC · JPL
691578	2014 QW_{229}	—	February 27, 2012	Haleakala	Pan-STARRS 1	·	2.5 km	MPC · JPL
691579	2014 QC_{230}	—	August 22, 2014	Haleakala	Pan-STARRS 1	·	950 m	MPC · JPL
691580	2014 QG_{231}	—	September 20, 2009	Kitt Peak	Spacewatch	·	2.2 km	MPC · JPL
691581	2014 QR_{232}	—	January 30, 2006	Kitt Peak	Spacewatch	·	2.7 km	MPC · JPL
691582	2014 QS_{233}	—	May 8, 2013	Calar Alto	F. Hormuth	·	1.0 km	MPC · JPL
691583	2014 QE_{234}	—	July 28, 2014	Haleakala	Pan-STARRS 1	·	2.2 km	MPC · JPL
691584	2014 QH_{234}	—	July 7, 2014	Haleakala	Pan-STARRS 1	·	1.6 km	MPC · JPL
691585	2014 QB_{236}	—	September 16, 2003	Kitt Peak	Spacewatch	THM	1.8 km	MPC · JPL
691586	2014 QC_{236}	—	October 15, 2007	Kitt Peak	Spacewatch	·	800 m	MPC · JPL
691587	2014 QN_{240}	—	July 16, 2004	Cerro Tololo	Deep Ecliptic Survey	KOR	1.2 km	MPC · JPL
691588	2014 QO_{241}	—	September 14, 2007	Mount Lemmon	Mount Lemmon Survey	MAS	600 m	MPC · JPL
691589	2014 QG_{242}	—	January 15, 2013	ESA OGS	ESA OGS	·	950 m	MPC · JPL
691590	2014 QC_{244}	—	October 18, 2009	Mount Lemmon	Mount Lemmon Survey	VER	2.1 km	MPC · JPL
691591	2014 QG_{245}	—	August 22, 2014	Haleakala	Pan-STARRS 1	·	2.4 km	MPC · JPL
691592	2014 QZ_{245}	—	August 22, 2014	Haleakala	Pan-STARRS 1	·	2.9 km	MPC · JPL
691593	2014 QP_{246}	—	February 8, 2011	Mount Lemmon	Mount Lemmon Survey	·	2.9 km	MPC · JPL
691594	2014 QC_{248}	—	January 23, 2006	Kitt Peak	Spacewatch	·	800 m	MPC · JPL
691595	2014 QR_{248}	—	August 22, 2014	Haleakala	Pan-STARRS 1	·	2.2 km	MPC · JPL
691596	2014 QW_{250}	—	August 22, 2014	Haleakala	Pan-STARRS 1	·	2.1 km	MPC · JPL
691597	2014 QC_{251}	—	December 8, 2010	Kitt Peak	Spacewatch	·	3.2 km	MPC · JPL
691598	2014 QX_{252}	—	September 28, 2009	Mount Lemmon	Mount Lemmon Survey	·	2.6 km	MPC · JPL
691599	2014 QF_{254}	—	January 29, 2011	Mount Lemmon	Mount Lemmon Survey	EOS	1.7 km	MPC · JPL
691600	2014 QM_{256}	—	December 10, 2010	Mount Lemmon	Mount Lemmon Survey	·	2.6 km	MPC · JPL

== 691601–691700 ==
back to top

Designation			Discovery			Properties		Ref
Permanent	Provisional	Named after	Date	Site	Discoverer(s)	Category	Diam.	Ref
691601	2014 QQ_{256}	—	August 22, 2014	Haleakala	Pan-STARRS 1	·	1.6 km	MPC · JPL
691602	2014 QZ_{256}	—	November 18, 2011	Mount Lemmon	Mount Lemmon Survey	·	1.2 km	MPC · JPL
691603	2014 QL_{258}	—	September 22, 2009	Mount Lemmon	Mount Lemmon Survey	·	3.2 km	MPC · JPL
691604	2014 QN_{258}	—	August 22, 2014	Haleakala	Pan-STARRS 1	ADE	1.9 km	MPC · JPL
691605	2014 QS_{259}	—	February 12, 2011	Mount Lemmon	Mount Lemmon Survey	EOS	2.0 km	MPC · JPL
691606	2014 QV_{259}	—	April 11, 2013	Oukaïmeden	C. Rinner	·	2.1 km	MPC · JPL
691607	2014 QY_{259}	—	February 1, 2006	Kitt Peak	Spacewatch	EOS	1.7 km	MPC · JPL
691608	2014 QA_{260}	—	January 23, 2011	Mount Lemmon	Mount Lemmon Survey	·	2.4 km	MPC · JPL
691609	2014 QU_{260}	—	October 25, 2009	Kitt Peak	Spacewatch	·	2.4 km	MPC · JPL
691610	2014 QJ_{262}	—	August 22, 2014	Haleakala	Pan-STARRS 1	·	990 m	MPC · JPL
691611	2014 QE_{263}	—	August 22, 2014	Haleakala	Pan-STARRS 1	VER	1.8 km	MPC · JPL
691612	2014 QD_{265}	—	August 22, 2014	Haleakala	Pan-STARRS 1	VER	2.1 km	MPC · JPL
691613	2014 QT_{266}	—	August 20, 2003	Haleakala	NEAT	·	2.8 km	MPC · JPL
691614	2014 QM_{268}	—	August 27, 2009	Kitt Peak	Spacewatch	·	1.9 km	MPC · JPL
691615	2014 QE_{271}	—	August 22, 2014	Haleakala	Pan-STARRS 1	·	1.7 km	MPC · JPL
691616	2014 QX_{275}	—	August 18, 2009	Kitt Peak	Spacewatch	·	2.3 km	MPC · JPL
691617	2014 QE_{276}	—	September 21, 2009	Mount Lemmon	Mount Lemmon Survey	THM	2.0 km	MPC · JPL
691618	2014 QW_{277}	—	October 23, 2011	Haleakala	Pan-STARRS 1	·	600 m	MPC · JPL
691619	2014 QS_{280}	—	August 15, 2014	Haleakala	Pan-STARRS 1	VER	2.6 km	MPC · JPL
691620	2014 QC_{282}	—	June 3, 2014	Haleakala	Pan-STARRS 1	·	2.2 km	MPC · JPL
691621	2014 QG_{282}	—	March 1, 2005	Kitt Peak	Spacewatch	·	940 m	MPC · JPL
691622	2014 QT_{282}	—	September 16, 2009	Mount Lemmon	Mount Lemmon Survey	·	2.7 km	MPC · JPL
691623	2014 QJ_{285}	—	June 4, 2013	Haleakala	Pan-STARRS 1	·	1.8 km	MPC · JPL
691624	2014 QD_{286}	—	September 17, 2009	Catalina	CSS	·	2.1 km	MPC · JPL
691625	2014 QL_{286}	—	August 25, 2014	Haleakala	Pan-STARRS 1	·	2.4 km	MPC · JPL
691626	2014 QT_{288}	—	April 12, 2013	Haleakala	Pan-STARRS 1	·	2.2 km	MPC · JPL
691627	2014 QK_{289}	—	March 16, 2007	Mount Lemmon	Mount Lemmon Survey	·	2.4 km	MPC · JPL
691628	2014 QX_{305}	—	July 7, 2014	Haleakala	Pan-STARRS 1	·	880 m	MPC · JPL
691629	2014 QQ_{308}	—	September 15, 2009	Kitt Peak	Spacewatch	THM	1.8 km	MPC · JPL
691630	2014 QT_{317}	—	July 8, 2014	Haleakala	Pan-STARRS 1	·	2.4 km	MPC · JPL
691631	2014 QH_{318}	—	February 25, 2007	Mount Lemmon	Mount Lemmon Survey	THM	2.0 km	MPC · JPL
691632	2014 QS_{319}	—	September 17, 2010	Mount Lemmon	Mount Lemmon Survey	AGN	900 m	MPC · JPL
691633	2014 QL_{322}	—	September 19, 2010	Kitt Peak	Spacewatch	·	820 m	MPC · JPL
691634	2014 QA_{323}	—	August 7, 2008	Kitt Peak	Spacewatch	·	2.1 km	MPC · JPL
691635	2014 QY_{323}	—	August 25, 2014	Haleakala	Pan-STARRS 1	·	2.9 km	MPC · JPL
691636	2014 QL_{328}	—	August 25, 2014	Haleakala	Pan-STARRS 1	·	3.4 km	MPC · JPL
691637	2014 QK_{329}	—	August 25, 2014	Haleakala	Pan-STARRS 1	·	2.7 km	MPC · JPL
691638	2014 QQ_{331}	—	September 7, 2008	Mount Lemmon	Mount Lemmon Survey	·	2.5 km	MPC · JPL
691639	2014 QY_{331}	—	February 5, 2011	Haleakala	Pan-STARRS 1	·	2.3 km	MPC · JPL
691640	2014 QW_{333}	—	August 25, 2014	Haleakala	Pan-STARRS 1	·	660 m	MPC · JPL
691641	2014 QB_{334}	—	August 25, 2014	Haleakala	Pan-STARRS 1	·	2.6 km	MPC · JPL
691642	2014 QE_{334}	—	August 25, 2014	Haleakala	Pan-STARRS 1	·	1.5 km	MPC · JPL
691643	2014 QA_{335}	—	August 25, 2014	Haleakala	Pan-STARRS 1	·	1.8 km	MPC · JPL
691644	2014 QM_{335}	—	October 8, 2007	Mount Lemmon	Mount Lemmon Survey	·	830 m	MPC · JPL
691645	2014 QM_{338}	—	September 15, 2009	Kitt Peak	Spacewatch	·	2.0 km	MPC · JPL
691646	2014 QT_{338}	—	October 15, 2009	Mount Lemmon	Mount Lemmon Survey	THM	1.8 km	MPC · JPL
691647	2014 QW_{338}	—	July 28, 2014	Haleakala	Pan-STARRS 1	KOR	1.1 km	MPC · JPL
691648	2014 QV_{339}	—	July 25, 2014	Haleakala	Pan-STARRS 1	·	3.0 km	MPC · JPL
691649	2014 QQ_{342}	—	July 25, 2014	Haleakala	Pan-STARRS 1	·	650 m	MPC · JPL
691650	2014 QF_{343}	—	September 19, 1998	Apache Point	SDSS	·	900 m	MPC · JPL
691651	2014 QY_{344}	—	August 15, 2009	Kitt Peak	Spacewatch	·	1.4 km	MPC · JPL
691652	2014 QE_{345}	—	December 6, 2005	Kitt Peak	Spacewatch	·	2.2 km	MPC · JPL
691653	2014 QL_{345}	—	April 15, 2013	Haleakala	Pan-STARRS 1	·	3.1 km	MPC · JPL
691654	2014 QP_{345}	—	August 26, 2014	Haleakala	Pan-STARRS 1	ARM	2.8 km	MPC · JPL
691655	2014 QS_{346}	—	August 26, 2014	Haleakala	Pan-STARRS 1	·	2.9 km	MPC · JPL
691656	2014 QY_{348}	—	February 23, 2007	Kitt Peak	Spacewatch	·	2.1 km	MPC · JPL
691657	2014 QH_{349}	—	October 16, 2003	Kitt Peak	Spacewatch	THM	2.1 km	MPC · JPL
691658	2014 QE_{350}	—	October 19, 2003	Kitt Peak	Spacewatch	·	2.1 km	MPC · JPL
691659	2014 QV_{350}	—	March 27, 2001	Kitt Peak	Spacewatch	·	2.7 km	MPC · JPL
691660	2014 QM_{352}	—	August 27, 2014	Haleakala	Pan-STARRS 1	V	550 m	MPC · JPL
691661	2014 QE_{354}	—	March 26, 2009	Kitt Peak	Spacewatch	·	810 m	MPC · JPL
691662	2014 QW_{355}	—	June 4, 2013	Mount Lemmon	Mount Lemmon Survey	·	2.2 km	MPC · JPL
691663	2014 QW_{356}	—	August 27, 2014	Haleakala	Pan-STARRS 1	·	2.3 km	MPC · JPL
691664	2014 QJ_{357}	—	August 30, 2002	Palomar	NEAT	THM	2.0 km	MPC · JPL
691665	2014 QX_{357}	—	November 2, 2007	Mount Lemmon	Mount Lemmon Survey	·	800 m	MPC · JPL
691666	2014 QW_{365}	—	October 24, 2003	Kitt Peak	Spacewatch	·	3.4 km	MPC · JPL
691667	2014 QL_{366}	—	December 28, 2011	Kitt Peak	Spacewatch	V	700 m	MPC · JPL
691668	2014 QO_{370}	—	August 20, 2014	Haleakala	Pan-STARRS 1	·	2.4 km	MPC · JPL
691669	2014 QR_{370}	—	September 15, 2006	Kitt Peak	Spacewatch	·	780 m	MPC · JPL
691670	2014 QA_{373}	—	November 26, 2003	Kitt Peak	Spacewatch	·	860 m	MPC · JPL
691671	2014 QQ_{374}	—	July 31, 2014	Haleakala	Pan-STARRS 1	(2076)	800 m	MPC · JPL
691672	2014 QC_{380}	—	March 14, 2000	Kitt Peak	Spacewatch	H	410 m	MPC · JPL
691673	2014 QB_{381}	—	March 10, 2007	Mount Lemmon	Mount Lemmon Survey	·	3.0 km	MPC · JPL
691674	2014 QE_{382}	—	August 28, 2014	ESA OGS	ESA OGS	·	910 m	MPC · JPL
691675	2014 QA_{383}	—	November 8, 2007	Kitt Peak	Spacewatch	NYS	910 m	MPC · JPL
691676	2014 QS_{384}	—	September 23, 2003	Haleakala	NEAT	·	2.4 km	MPC · JPL
691677	2014 QF_{388}	—	July 25, 2014	Haleakala	Pan-STARRS 1	·	1.7 km	MPC · JPL
691678	2014 QJ_{388}	—	March 16, 2012	Mount Lemmon	Mount Lemmon Survey	·	1.4 km	MPC · JPL
691679	2014 QH_{389}	—	August 30, 2014	Mount Lemmon	Mount Lemmon Survey	·	660 m	MPC · JPL
691680	2014 QX_{389}	—	August 30, 2014	Mount Lemmon	Mount Lemmon Survey	·	2.2 km	MPC · JPL
691681	2014 QZ_{389}	—	December 6, 2010	Mount Lemmon	Mount Lemmon Survey	·	2.8 km	MPC · JPL
691682	2014 QS_{390}	—	June 30, 2014	Haleakala	Pan-STARRS 1	H	520 m	MPC · JPL
691683	2014 QB_{393}	—	October 19, 2003	Kitt Peak	Spacewatch	·	2.8 km	MPC · JPL
691684	2014 QB_{394}	—	October 19, 2003	Apache Point	SDSS Collaboration	(8737)	2.6 km	MPC · JPL
691685	2014 QJ_{394}	—	August 20, 2014	Haleakala	Pan-STARRS 1	·	2.3 km	MPC · JPL
691686	2014 QP_{394}	—	August 21, 2008	Kitt Peak	Spacewatch	·	2.2 km	MPC · JPL
691687	2014 QQ_{394}	—	October 2, 2008	Kitt Peak	Spacewatch	·	2.8 km	MPC · JPL
691688	2014 QM_{395}	—	March 25, 2006	Kitt Peak	Spacewatch	·	2.8 km	MPC · JPL
691689	2014 QT_{395}	—	September 14, 2007	Mount Lemmon	Mount Lemmon Survey	·	690 m	MPC · JPL
691690	2014 QU_{397}	—	November 9, 2007	Mount Lemmon	Mount Lemmon Survey	·	780 m	MPC · JPL
691691	2014 QG_{399}	—	September 28, 2009	Mount Lemmon	Mount Lemmon Survey	·	2.7 km	MPC · JPL
691692	2014 QV_{401}	—	August 28, 2014	Haleakala	Pan-STARRS 1	·	2.7 km	MPC · JPL
691693	2014 QA_{402}	—	July 1, 2008	Kitt Peak	Spacewatch	·	2.9 km	MPC · JPL
691694	2014 QJ_{402}	—	September 18, 2003	Kitt Peak	Spacewatch	·	2.3 km	MPC · JPL
691695	2014 QF_{404}	—	January 14, 2011	Mount Lemmon	Mount Lemmon Survey	·	2.4 km	MPC · JPL
691696	2014 QT_{404}	—	January 15, 2008	Mount Lemmon	Mount Lemmon Survey	·	1.2 km	MPC · JPL
691697	2014 QB_{406}	—	August 6, 2014	Haleakala	Pan-STARRS 1	·	2.5 km	MPC · JPL
691698	2014 QH_{410}	—	September 5, 2003	Siding Spring	G. J. Garradd, R. H. McNaught	·	2.6 km	MPC · JPL
691699	2014 QD_{411}	—	August 30, 2014	Mount Lemmon	Mount Lemmon Survey	·	1.8 km	MPC · JPL
691700	2014 QY_{411}	—	February 23, 2012	Mount Lemmon	Mount Lemmon Survey	·	1.9 km	MPC · JPL

== 691701–691800 ==
back to top

Designation			Discovery			Properties		Ref
Permanent	Provisional	Named after	Date	Site	Discoverer(s)	Category	Diam.	Ref
691701	2014 QB_{412}	—	September 30, 2003	Kitt Peak	Spacewatch	·	2.2 km	MPC · JPL
691702	2014 QD_{412}	—	February 16, 2012	Haleakala	Pan-STARRS 1	NAE	1.7 km	MPC · JPL
691703	2014 QJ_{412}	—	March 15, 2012	Mount Lemmon	Mount Lemmon Survey	·	2.4 km	MPC · JPL
691704	2014 QT_{414}	—	February 4, 2000	Kitt Peak	Spacewatch	HYG	2.5 km	MPC · JPL
691705	2014 QZ_{414}	—	September 18, 2009	Mount Lemmon	Mount Lemmon Survey	EOS	1.4 km	MPC · JPL
691706	2014 QV_{415}	—	May 15, 2013	Haleakala	Pan-STARRS 1	·	2.5 km	MPC · JPL
691707	2014 QX_{415}	—	August 25, 2004	Kitt Peak	Spacewatch	·	550 m	MPC · JPL
691708	2014 QF_{418}	—	February 5, 2006	Mount Lemmon	Mount Lemmon Survey	·	2.0 km	MPC · JPL
691709	2014 QG_{419}	—	September 5, 2010	Mount Lemmon	Mount Lemmon Survey	·	1.0 km	MPC · JPL
691710	2014 QW_{422}	—	August 6, 2014	Kitt Peak	Spacewatch	NYS	850 m	MPC · JPL
691711	2014 QX_{422}	—	May 16, 2013	Mount Lemmon	Mount Lemmon Survey	·	1.8 km	MPC · JPL
691712	2014 QM_{425}	—	February 23, 2012	Mount Lemmon	Mount Lemmon Survey	AST	1.2 km	MPC · JPL
691713	2014 QY_{426}	—	July 27, 2014	Haleakala	Pan-STARRS 1	H	370 m	MPC · JPL
691714	2014 QV_{427}	—	October 4, 2005	Mount Lemmon	Mount Lemmon Survey	HOF	2.3 km	MPC · JPL
691715	2014 QK_{428}	—	May 11, 2007	Mount Lemmon	Mount Lemmon Survey	·	2.6 km	MPC · JPL
691716	2014 QO_{428}	—	August 31, 2014	Haleakala	Pan-STARRS 1	VER	2.1 km	MPC · JPL
691717	2014 QU_{429}	—	August 31, 2014	Haleakala	Pan-STARRS 1	·	760 m	MPC · JPL
691718	2014 QJ_{435}	—	August 28, 2014	Haleakala	Pan-STARRS 1	·	1.8 km	MPC · JPL
691719	2014 QF_{437}	—	June 30, 2014	Haleakala	Pan-STARRS 1	EOS	1.7 km	MPC · JPL
691720	2014 QQ_{441}	—	January 10, 2006	Kitt Peak	Spacewatch	EOS	1.8 km	MPC · JPL
691721	2014 QY_{441}	—	November 2, 2005	Kitt Peak	Trilling, D. E.	res · 3:4	264 km	MPC · JPL
691722	2014 QC_{444}	—	August 18, 2014	Haleakala	Pan-STARRS 1	·	2.3 km	MPC · JPL
691723	2014 QJ_{449}	—	March 16, 2007	Mount Lemmon	Mount Lemmon Survey	THM	1.6 km	MPC · JPL
691724	2014 QV_{450}	—	August 23, 2014	Haleakala	Pan-STARRS 1	·	950 m	MPC · JPL
691725	2014 QZ_{450}	—	August 26, 2014	Haleakala	Pan-STARRS 1	·	1.8 km	MPC · JPL
691726	2014 QJ_{451}	—	February 8, 2011	Mount Lemmon	Mount Lemmon Survey	·	2.5 km	MPC · JPL
691727	2014 QU_{452}	—	August 28, 2014	Haleakala	Pan-STARRS 1	·	2.6 km	MPC · JPL
691728	2014 QF_{453}	—	September 30, 2003	Kitt Peak	Spacewatch	·	2.4 km	MPC · JPL
691729	2014 QU_{453}	—	September 20, 2009	Mount Lemmon	Mount Lemmon Survey	·	2.5 km	MPC · JPL
691730	2014 QP_{454}	—	December 3, 2010	Mount Lemmon	Mount Lemmon Survey	EOS	1.7 km	MPC · JPL
691731	2014 QV_{454}	—	August 16, 2014	Haleakala	Pan-STARRS 1	·	2.6 km	MPC · JPL
691732	2014 QE_{455}	—	October 27, 2005	Mount Lemmon	Mount Lemmon Survey	·	2.0 km	MPC · JPL
691733	2014 QG_{456}	—	August 31, 2014	Haleakala	Pan-STARRS 1	·	1.6 km	MPC · JPL
691734	2014 QL_{456}	—	April 21, 2012	Mount Lemmon	Mount Lemmon Survey	·	2.6 km	MPC · JPL
691735	2014 QN_{456}	—	June 7, 2013	Haleakala	Pan-STARRS 1	·	2.3 km	MPC · JPL
691736	2014 QR_{456}	—	September 18, 2003	Kitt Peak	Spacewatch	TIR	2.0 km	MPC · JPL
691737	2014 QW_{456}	—	September 28, 2003	Kitt Peak	Spacewatch	·	2.6 km	MPC · JPL
691738	2014 QC_{457}	—	March 11, 2007	Kitt Peak	Spacewatch	·	3.0 km	MPC · JPL
691739	2014 QH_{457}	—	September 29, 2003	Kitt Peak	Spacewatch	·	2.1 km	MPC · JPL
691740	2014 QM_{457}	—	August 26, 2014	ESA OGS	ESA OGS	·	2.3 km	MPC · JPL
691741	2014 QQ_{457}	—	February 10, 2011	Mount Lemmon	Mount Lemmon Survey	·	2.2 km	MPC · JPL
691742	2014 QA_{460}	—	December 26, 2006	Kitt Peak	Spacewatch	HOF	2.0 km	MPC · JPL
691743	2014 QM_{460}	—	September 19, 2003	Kitt Peak	Spacewatch	THM	1.4 km	MPC · JPL
691744	2014 QO_{460}	—	August 20, 2014	Haleakala	Pan-STARRS 1	·	890 m	MPC · JPL
691745	2014 QX_{460}	—	August 20, 2014	Haleakala	Pan-STARRS 1	HOF	1.9 km	MPC · JPL
691746	2014 QS_{461}	—	June 10, 2013	Mount Lemmon	Mount Lemmon Survey	·	2.4 km	MPC · JPL
691747	2014 QF_{462}	—	March 29, 2008	Mount Lemmon	Mount Lemmon Survey	HOF	1.9 km	MPC · JPL
691748	2014 QO_{462}	—	September 21, 2003	Kitt Peak	Spacewatch	·	2.1 km	MPC · JPL
691749	2014 QR_{463}	—	August 22, 2014	Haleakala	Pan-STARRS 1	TIR	2.2 km	MPC · JPL
691750	2014 QH_{464}	—	August 23, 2014	Haleakala	Pan-STARRS 1	·	1.3 km	MPC · JPL
691751	2014 QS_{465}	—	August 24, 2014	Piszkéstető	K. Sárneczky	·	2.4 km	MPC · JPL
691752	2014 QT_{465}	—	April 10, 2013	Mount Lemmon	Mount Lemmon Survey	·	2.5 km	MPC · JPL
691753	2014 QV_{466}	—	March 22, 2012	Mount Lemmon	Mount Lemmon Survey	·	2.5 km	MPC · JPL
691754	2014 QW_{467}	—	August 27, 2014	Haleakala	Pan-STARRS 1	·	2.1 km	MPC · JPL
691755	2014 QA_{468}	—	August 27, 2014	Haleakala	Pan-STARRS 1	HOF	2.3 km	MPC · JPL
691756	2014 QJ_{468}	—	August 27, 2014	Haleakala	Pan-STARRS 1	PHO	610 m	MPC · JPL
691757	2014 QA_{469}	—	August 27, 2014	Haleakala	Pan-STARRS 1	·	2.0 km	MPC · JPL
691758	2014 QQ_{469}	—	August 28, 2014	Haleakala	Pan-STARRS 1	·	1.7 km	MPC · JPL
691759	2014 QO_{470}	—	August 28, 2014	Haleakala	Pan-STARRS 1	·	2.3 km	MPC · JPL
691760	2014 QH_{471}	—	August 29, 2014	Haleakala	Pan-STARRS 1	·	3.0 km	MPC · JPL
691761	2014 QZ_{474}	—	October 11, 2010	Mount Lemmon	Mount Lemmon Survey	·	1.7 km	MPC · JPL
691762	2014 QF_{475}	—	October 8, 2004	Kitt Peak	Spacewatch	·	2.2 km	MPC · JPL
691763	2014 QL_{476}	—	October 18, 2003	Apache Point	SDSS Collaboration	·	2.3 km	MPC · JPL
691764	2014 QB_{477}	—	September 17, 2009	Mount Lemmon	Mount Lemmon Survey	HYG	1.9 km	MPC · JPL
691765	2014 QB_{478}	—	December 3, 2004	Kitt Peak	Spacewatch	THM	2.0 km	MPC · JPL
691766	2014 QF_{479}	—	January 23, 2011	Mount Lemmon	Mount Lemmon Survey	·	2.4 km	MPC · JPL
691767	2014 QQ_{479}	—	September 30, 2005	Mount Lemmon	Mount Lemmon Survey	AGN	1 km	MPC · JPL
691768	2014 QE_{483}	—	March 3, 2006	Kitt Peak	Spacewatch	VER	2.4 km	MPC · JPL
691769	2014 QB_{484}	—	August 20, 2014	Haleakala	Pan-STARRS 1	MAS	550 m	MPC · JPL
691770	2014 QC_{484}	—	November 16, 2009	Mount Lemmon	Mount Lemmon Survey	·	2.6 km	MPC · JPL
691771	2014 QD_{484}	—	February 13, 2002	Kitt Peak	Spacewatch	KOR	1.2 km	MPC · JPL
691772	2014 QX_{485}	—	January 28, 2006	Kitt Peak	Spacewatch	EOS	1.8 km	MPC · JPL
691773	2014 QY_{485}	—	September 22, 2009	Mount Lemmon	Mount Lemmon Survey	HYG	2.4 km	MPC · JPL
691774	2014 QS_{486}	—	September 26, 2003	Apache Point	SDSS Collaboration	VER	2.2 km	MPC · JPL
691775	2014 QU_{486}	—	August 20, 2014	Haleakala	Pan-STARRS 1	·	2.1 km	MPC · JPL
691776	2014 QP_{487}	—	September 14, 2005	Kitt Peak	Spacewatch	·	1.7 km	MPC · JPL
691777	2014 QW_{488}	—	February 14, 2007	Mauna Kea	P. A. Wiegert	KOR	1.2 km	MPC · JPL
691778	2014 QW_{489}	—	January 23, 2006	Kitt Peak	Spacewatch	VER	2.1 km	MPC · JPL
691779	2014 QJ_{490}	—	September 17, 2009	Mount Lemmon	Mount Lemmon Survey	·	2.7 km	MPC · JPL
691780	2014 QD_{491}	—	April 7, 2008	Kitt Peak	Spacewatch	·	1.7 km	MPC · JPL
691781	2014 QJ_{492}	—	September 25, 2005	Kitt Peak	Spacewatch	·	1.8 km	MPC · JPL
691782	2014 QF_{495}	—	August 23, 2014	Haleakala	Pan-STARRS 1	EOS	1.5 km	MPC · JPL
691783	2014 QQ_{496}	—	August 30, 2014	Haleakala	Pan-STARRS 1	H	400 m	MPC · JPL
691784	2014 QF_{505}	—	August 30, 2014	Mount Lemmon	Mount Lemmon Survey	·	2.2 km	MPC · JPL
691785	2014 QG_{505}	—	August 25, 2014	Haleakala	Pan-STARRS 1	·	2.3 km	MPC · JPL
691786	2014 QV_{518}	—	August 22, 2014	Haleakala	Pan-STARRS 1	EOS	2.0 km	MPC · JPL
691787	2014 QM_{522}	—	August 20, 2014	Haleakala	Pan-STARRS 1	V	520 m	MPC · JPL
691788	2014 QN_{527}	—	August 28, 2014	Haleakala	Pan-STARRS 1	·	820 m	MPC · JPL
691789	2014 QS_{528}	—	August 21, 2014	Haleakala	Pan-STARRS 1	·	2.1 km	MPC · JPL
691790	2014 QX_{528}	—	November 20, 2003	Kitt Peak	Spacewatch	PHO	770 m	MPC · JPL
691791	2014 QB_{529}	—	August 28, 2014	Haleakala	Pan-STARRS 1	·	2.1 km	MPC · JPL
691792	2014 QE_{531}	—	August 28, 2014	Haleakala	Pan-STARRS 1	VER	2.0 km	MPC · JPL
691793	2014 QZ_{531}	—	August 28, 2014	Haleakala	Pan-STARRS 1	·	2.9 km	MPC · JPL
691794	2014 QC_{534}	—	August 28, 2014	Haleakala	Pan-STARRS 1	EOS	1.9 km	MPC · JPL
691795	2014 QL_{534}	—	August 27, 2014	Haleakala	Pan-STARRS 1	·	710 m	MPC · JPL
691796	2014 QJ_{536}	—	August 22, 2014	Haleakala	Pan-STARRS 1	·	2.6 km	MPC · JPL
691797	2014 QW_{539}	—	August 27, 2014	Haleakala	Pan-STARRS 1	·	2.6 km	MPC · JPL
691798	2014 QG_{541}	—	August 22, 2014	Haleakala	Pan-STARRS 1	V	470 m	MPC · JPL
691799	2014 QF_{544}	—	August 25, 2014	Haleakala	Pan-STARRS 1	·	2.8 km	MPC · JPL
691800	2014 QH_{544}	—	August 23, 2014	Haleakala	Pan-STARRS 1	·	2.3 km	MPC · JPL

== 691801–691900 ==
back to top

Designation			Discovery			Properties		Ref
Permanent	Provisional	Named after	Date	Site	Discoverer(s)	Category	Diam.	Ref
691801	2014 QR_{544}	—	August 28, 2014	Haleakala	Pan-STARRS 1	·	2.5 km	MPC · JPL
691802	2014 QU_{546}	—	August 28, 2014	Haleakala	Pan-STARRS 1	·	1.8 km	MPC · JPL
691803	2014 QZ_{546}	—	August 31, 2014	Mount Lemmon	Mount Lemmon Survey	EOS	1.4 km	MPC · JPL
691804	2014 QH_{558}	—	August 22, 2014	Haleakala	Pan-STARRS 1	V	420 m	MPC · JPL
691805	2014 QE_{560}	—	August 22, 2014	Haleakala	Pan-STARRS 1	·	500 m	MPC · JPL
691806	2014 QF_{560}	—	August 25, 2014	Haleakala	Pan-STARRS 1	V	430 m	MPC · JPL
691807	2014 QQ_{563}	—	August 25, 2014	Haleakala	Pan-STARRS 1	·	2.1 km	MPC · JPL
691808	2014 QP_{564}	—	August 18, 2014	Haleakala	Pan-STARRS 1	·	880 m	MPC · JPL
691809	2014 QJ_{566}	—	August 22, 2014	Haleakala	Pan-STARRS 1	·	3.0 km	MPC · JPL
691810	2014 QO_{568}	—	August 31, 2014	Haleakala	Pan-STARRS 1	·	830 m	MPC · JPL
691811	2014 QZ_{576}	—	August 31, 2014	Haleakala	Pan-STARRS 1	·	1.3 km	MPC · JPL
691812	2014 QV_{584}	—	August 23, 2014	Haleakala	Pan-STARRS 1	·	1 km	MPC · JPL
691813	2014 QZ_{584}	—	February 27, 2006	Mount Lemmon	Mount Lemmon Survey	·	2.3 km	MPC · JPL
691814	2014 QS_{597}	—	August 22, 2014	Haleakala	Pan-STARRS 1	·	2.5 km	MPC · JPL
691815	2014 QM_{598}	—	August 25, 2014	Haleakala	Pan-STARRS 1	·	2.5 km	MPC · JPL
691816	2014 QZ_{598}	—	April 18, 2007	Kitt Peak	Spacewatch	VER	2.3 km	MPC · JPL
691817	2014 RA_{1}	—	April 15, 2008	Mount Lemmon	Mount Lemmon Survey	·	2.0 km	MPC · JPL
691818	2014 RA_{3}	—	September 1, 2014	Mount Lemmon	Mount Lemmon Survey	·	1.0 km	MPC · JPL
691819	2014 RZ_{3}	—	July 30, 2014	Haleakala	Pan-STARRS 1	V	410 m	MPC · JPL
691820	2014 RA_{4}	—	April 21, 2002	Palomar	NEAT	·	2.5 km	MPC · JPL
691821	2014 RC_{4}	—	April 22, 2007	Kitt Peak	Spacewatch	EOS	1.8 km	MPC · JPL
691822	2014 RD_{5}	—	November 7, 2005	Mauna Kea	A. Boattini	·	1.9 km	MPC · JPL
691823	2014 RZ_{5}	—	September 1, 2014	Mount Lemmon	Mount Lemmon Survey	·	3.2 km	MPC · JPL
691824	2014 RC_{9}	—	September 24, 2000	Socorro	LINEAR	·	2.0 km	MPC · JPL
691825	2014 RS_{9}	—	September 30, 2003	Kitt Peak	Spacewatch	·	2.0 km	MPC · JPL
691826	2014 RV_{9}	—	September 27, 2003	Kitt Peak	Spacewatch	·	2.7 km	MPC · JPL
691827	2014 RK_{13}	—	June 12, 2008	Kitt Peak	Spacewatch	·	2.9 km	MPC · JPL
691828	2014 RB_{14}	—	September 22, 2008	Mount Lemmon	Mount Lemmon Survey	·	690 m	MPC · JPL
691829	2014 RM_{14}	—	January 5, 2011	Mount Lemmon	Mount Lemmon Survey	EMA	3.3 km	MPC · JPL
691830	2014 RN_{15}	—	September 1, 2014	Mount Lemmon	Mount Lemmon Survey	·	3.0 km	MPC · JPL
691831	2014 RM_{17}	—	September 18, 2006	Catalina	CSS	H	400 m	MPC · JPL
691832	2014 RP_{17}	—	February 9, 2013	Sayan Solar	Karavaev, Y., Mishina, M.	H	480 m	MPC · JPL
691833	2014 RQ_{19}	—	July 7, 2014	Haleakala	Pan-STARRS 1	·	2.7 km	MPC · JPL
691834	2014 RR_{19}	—	June 24, 2014	Haleakala	Pan-STARRS 1	·	600 m	MPC · JPL
691835	2014 RW_{19}	—	August 4, 2014	Haleakala	Pan-STARRS 1	·	2.2 km	MPC · JPL
691836	2014 RV_{21}	—	October 2, 2010	Mount Lemmon	Mount Lemmon Survey	·	1.3 km	MPC · JPL
691837	2014 RF_{23}	—	September 18, 2010	Mount Lemmon	Mount Lemmon Survey	·	1.4 km	MPC · JPL
691838	2014 RC_{24}	—	July 10, 2014	Haleakala	Pan-STARRS 1	EUN	960 m	MPC · JPL
691839	2014 RU_{24}	—	April 13, 2013	Haleakala	Pan-STARRS 1	·	2.7 km	MPC · JPL
691840	2014 RO_{25}	—	September 25, 2009	Catalina	CSS	·	1.8 km	MPC · JPL
691841	2014 RE_{26}	—	November 2, 2008	Mount Lemmon	Mount Lemmon Survey	·	570 m	MPC · JPL
691842	2014 RJ_{26}	—	November 24, 2009	XuYi	PMO NEO Survey Program	·	2.5 km	MPC · JPL
691843	2014 RZ_{26}	—	April 12, 2013	Haleakala	Pan-STARRS 1	·	2.9 km	MPC · JPL
691844	2014 RC_{27}	—	September 25, 2003	Palomar	NEAT	·	2.2 km	MPC · JPL
691845	2014 RV_{27}	—	August 3, 2014	Haleakala	Pan-STARRS 1	·	2.1 km	MPC · JPL
691846	2014 RF_{29}	—	April 11, 2013	Kitt Peak	Spacewatch	·	1.9 km	MPC · JPL
691847	2014 RJ_{30}	—	October 14, 2009	Mount Lemmon	Mount Lemmon Survey	·	2.1 km	MPC · JPL
691848	2014 RB_{33}	—	August 20, 2014	Haleakala	Pan-STARRS 1	·	2.2 km	MPC · JPL
691849	2014 RJ_{34}	—	July 7, 2014	Haleakala	Pan-STARRS 1	·	2.4 km	MPC · JPL
691850	2014 RD_{37}	—	May 8, 2013	Haleakala	Pan-STARRS 1	·	2.1 km	MPC · JPL
691851	2014 RH_{37}	—	July 7, 2014	Haleakala	Pan-STARRS 1	·	2.2 km	MPC · JPL
691852	2014 RV_{38}	—	September 22, 2011	Kitt Peak	Spacewatch	·	570 m	MPC · JPL
691853	2014 RC_{39}	—	October 16, 2003	Kitt Peak	Spacewatch	THM	2.2 km	MPC · JPL
691854	2014 RS_{39}	—	September 18, 2003	Kitt Peak	Spacewatch	·	2.4 km	MPC · JPL
691855	2014 RG_{40}	—	October 14, 2009	Mount Lemmon	Mount Lemmon Survey	VER	2.4 km	MPC · JPL
691856	2014 RN_{45}	—	February 26, 2011	Mount Lemmon	Mount Lemmon Survey	·	2.3 km	MPC · JPL
691857	2014 RY_{46}	—	April 16, 2013	Cerro Tololo	DECam	·	820 m	MPC · JPL
691858	2014 RP_{50}	—	September 28, 2003	Kitt Peak	Spacewatch	THM	2.1 km	MPC · JPL
691859	2014 RR_{51}	—	August 20, 2014	Haleakala	Pan-STARRS 1	·	2.3 km	MPC · JPL
691860	2014 RE_{52}	—	October 29, 2005	Kitt Peak	Spacewatch	KOR	1.2 km	MPC · JPL
691861	2014 RH_{52}	—	August 29, 2009	Kitt Peak	Spacewatch	·	2.1 km	MPC · JPL
691862	2014 RY_{52}	—	August 27, 2009	Kitt Peak	Spacewatch	·	1.4 km	MPC · JPL
691863	2014 RH_{54}	—	July 28, 2014	Haleakala	Pan-STARRS 1	·	2.6 km	MPC · JPL
691864	2014 RW_{54}	—	March 15, 2012	Mount Lemmon	Mount Lemmon Survey	·	1.9 km	MPC · JPL
691865	2014 RJ_{58}	—	August 7, 2008	Kitt Peak	Spacewatch	·	2.3 km	MPC · JPL
691866	2014 RY_{58}	—	November 25, 2005	Kitt Peak	Spacewatch	KOR	1.4 km	MPC · JPL
691867	2014 RF_{59}	—	August 27, 2014	Haleakala	Pan-STARRS 1	·	2.2 km	MPC · JPL
691868	2014 RU_{59}	—	December 31, 2008	Mount Lemmon	Mount Lemmon Survey	·	440 m	MPC · JPL
691869	2014 RM_{60}	—	September 15, 2014	Mount Lemmon	Mount Lemmon Survey	·	2.5 km	MPC · JPL
691870	2014 RN_{60}	—	November 16, 2009	Mount Lemmon	Mount Lemmon Survey	·	2.7 km	MPC · JPL
691871	2014 RN_{61}	—	August 28, 2014	Haleakala	Pan-STARRS 1	·	3.0 km	MPC · JPL
691872	2014 RN_{62}	—	July 5, 2003	Kitt Peak	Spacewatch	·	2.9 km	MPC · JPL
691873	2014 RR_{64}	—	February 8, 2011	Mount Lemmon	Mount Lemmon Survey	·	2.6 km	MPC · JPL
691874	2014 RC_{65}	—	September 12, 2014	Haleakala	Pan-STARRS 1	·	2.1 km	MPC · JPL
691875	2014 RZ_{65}	—	December 17, 2009	Mount Lemmon	Mount Lemmon Survey	T_{j} (2.99) · EUP	3.0 km	MPC · JPL
691876	2014 RR_{66}	—	October 2, 2003	Kitt Peak	Spacewatch	TIR	2.1 km	MPC · JPL
691877	2014 RB_{69}	—	September 7, 2014	Haleakala	Pan-STARRS 1	·	2.7 km	MPC · JPL
691878	2014 RN_{71}	—	September 1, 2014	Mount Lemmon	Mount Lemmon Survey	·	630 m	MPC · JPL
691879	2014 RR_{71}	—	September 11, 2014	Haleakala	Pan-STARRS 1	·	2.5 km	MPC · JPL
691880	2014 RV_{73}	—	September 2, 2014	Haleakala	Pan-STARRS 1	·	970 m	MPC · JPL
691881	2014 RB_{79}	—	September 2, 2014	Haleakala	Pan-STARRS 1	ELF	2.7 km	MPC · JPL
691882	2014 RJ_{79}	—	September 1, 2014	Mount Lemmon	Mount Lemmon Survey	·	2.2 km	MPC · JPL
691883	2014 RZ_{80}	—	September 2, 2014	Haleakala	Pan-STARRS 1	·	1.8 km	MPC · JPL
691884	2014 RD_{83}	—	September 12, 2014	Haleakala	Pan-STARRS 1	VER	2.4 km	MPC · JPL
691885	2014 RJ_{84}	—	September 2, 2014	Haleakala	Pan-STARRS 1	EOS	1.1 km	MPC · JPL
691886	2014 RT_{85}	—	September 2, 2014	Haleakala	Pan-STARRS 1	·	760 m	MPC · JPL
691887	2014 RW_{85}	—	September 14, 2014	Mount Lemmon	Mount Lemmon Survey	(2076)	760 m	MPC · JPL
691888	2014 RT_{87}	—	September 3, 2014	Mount Lemmon	Mount Lemmon Survey	·	2.7 km	MPC · JPL
691889	2014 RL_{91}	—	September 6, 2014	Mount Lemmon	Mount Lemmon Survey	H	390 m	MPC · JPL
691890	2014 SH_{2}	—	December 25, 2010	Mount Lemmon	Mount Lemmon Survey	·	2.0 km	MPC · JPL
691891	2014 SM_{4}	—	November 17, 2009	Catalina	CSS	·	2.8 km	MPC · JPL
691892	2014 SN_{4}	—	January 14, 2011	Mount Lemmon	Mount Lemmon Survey	·	2.8 km	MPC · JPL
691893	2014 SG_{6}	—	March 24, 2012	Kitt Peak	Spacewatch	·	2.4 km	MPC · JPL
691894	2014 SC_{9}	—	February 27, 2012	Haleakala	Pan-STARRS 1	·	3.0 km	MPC · JPL
691895	2014 ST_{9}	—	April 18, 2007	Kitt Peak	Spacewatch	·	2.8 km	MPC · JPL
691896	2014 SN_{10}	—	August 18, 2014	Haleakala	Pan-STARRS 1	·	2.3 km	MPC · JPL
691897	2014 SX_{12}	—	August 27, 2009	Kitt Peak	Spacewatch	·	1.6 km	MPC · JPL
691898	2014 SM_{13}	—	August 20, 2014	Haleakala	Pan-STARRS 1	·	1.5 km	MPC · JPL
691899	2014 SG_{16}	—	January 23, 2006	Kitt Peak	Spacewatch	·	2.9 km	MPC · JPL
691900	2014 ST_{17}	—	October 10, 2007	Mount Lemmon	Mount Lemmon Survey	·	950 m	MPC · JPL

== 691901–692000 ==
back to top

Designation			Discovery			Properties		Ref
Permanent	Provisional	Named after	Date	Site	Discoverer(s)	Category	Diam.	Ref
691901	2014 SW_{21}	—	September 17, 2003	Kitt Peak	Spacewatch	·	2.4 km	MPC · JPL
691902	2014 SR_{24}	—	August 27, 2014	Haleakala	Pan-STARRS 1	·	1.0 km	MPC · JPL
691903	2014 SZ_{24}	—	August 27, 2014	Haleakala	Pan-STARRS 1	·	600 m	MPC · JPL
691904	2014 SW_{25}	—	August 27, 2014	Haleakala	Pan-STARRS 1	·	2.4 km	MPC · JPL
691905	2014 SU_{27}	—	February 8, 2011	Mount Lemmon	Mount Lemmon Survey	·	2.6 km	MPC · JPL
691906	2014 SA_{30}	—	August 27, 2014	Haleakala	Pan-STARRS 1	·	960 m	MPC · JPL
691907	2014 SR_{30}	—	June 7, 2013	Haleakala	Pan-STARRS 1	·	2.2 km	MPC · JPL
691908	2014 SW_{30}	—	August 27, 2014	Haleakala	Pan-STARRS 1	(5)	880 m	MPC · JPL
691909	2014 ST_{31}	—	March 28, 2008	Kitt Peak	Spacewatch	·	1.7 km	MPC · JPL
691910	2014 SJ_{32}	—	September 29, 2008	Mount Lemmon	Mount Lemmon Survey	·	2.8 km	MPC · JPL
691911	2014 SL_{32}	—	September 12, 2007	Mount Lemmon	Mount Lemmon Survey	·	580 m	MPC · JPL
691912	2014 SL_{33}	—	September 12, 2014	Haleakala	Pan-STARRS 1	·	590 m	MPC · JPL
691913	2014 SP_{33}	—	February 27, 2012	Haleakala	Pan-STARRS 1	·	1.7 km	MPC · JPL
691914	2014 SK_{36}	—	April 10, 2013	Haleakala	Pan-STARRS 1	·	820 m	MPC · JPL
691915	2014 SS_{38}	—	September 17, 2014	Haleakala	Pan-STARRS 1	·	1.3 km	MPC · JPL
691916	2014 SV_{38}	—	September 17, 2014	Haleakala	Pan-STARRS 1	(43176)	2.7 km	MPC · JPL
691917	2014 SU_{39}	—	September 17, 2014	Haleakala	Pan-STARRS 1	·	2.5 km	MPC · JPL
691918	2014 SW_{39}	—	January 26, 2011	Mount Lemmon	Mount Lemmon Survey	·	2.4 km	MPC · JPL
691919	2014 SL_{40}	—	September 17, 2009	Kitt Peak	Spacewatch	·	2.4 km	MPC · JPL
691920	2014 SQ_{43}	—	September 17, 2014	Haleakala	Pan-STARRS 1	·	810 m	MPC · JPL
691921	2014 SB_{46}	—	April 18, 2007	Mount Lemmon	Mount Lemmon Survey	·	2.5 km	MPC · JPL
691922	2014 SK_{47}	—	May 17, 2002	Kitt Peak	Spacewatch	LIX	3.2 km	MPC · JPL
691923	2014 SD_{48}	—	November 18, 2009	Mount Lemmon	Mount Lemmon Survey	·	2.1 km	MPC · JPL
691924	2014 SJ_{49}	—	August 1, 2001	Palomar	NEAT	·	590 m	MPC · JPL
691925	2014 SH_{50}	—	April 14, 2008	Mount Lemmon	Mount Lemmon Survey	·	1.6 km	MPC · JPL
691926	2014 SX_{50}	—	September 19, 1998	Apache Point	SDSS Collaboration	·	2.0 km	MPC · JPL
691927	2014 SH_{55}	—	June 7, 2013	Haleakala	Pan-STARRS 1	·	2.1 km	MPC · JPL
691928	2014 SC_{56}	—	September 28, 2009	Kitt Peak	Spacewatch	EOS	1.3 km	MPC · JPL
691929	2014 SR_{58}	—	March 28, 2008	Kitt Peak	Spacewatch	·	2.1 km	MPC · JPL
691930	2014 SO_{63}	—	November 25, 2011	Haleakala	Pan-STARRS 1	·	640 m	MPC · JPL
691931	2014 SW_{67}	—	September 20, 2009	Kitt Peak	Spacewatch	·	2.3 km	MPC · JPL
691932	2014 SZ_{68}	—	August 28, 2005	Kitt Peak	Spacewatch	·	1.6 km	MPC · JPL
691933	2014 SP_{69}	—	September 18, 2014	Haleakala	Pan-STARRS 1	·	2.4 km	MPC · JPL
691934	2014 SZ_{70}	—	September 18, 2014	Haleakala	Pan-STARRS 1	·	1.4 km	MPC · JPL
691935	2014 SV_{71}	—	September 11, 2014	Haleakala	Pan-STARRS 1	·	2.4 km	MPC · JPL
691936	2014 SD_{72}	—	December 21, 2006	Kitt Peak	L. H. Wasserman, M. W. Buie	HOF	2.1 km	MPC · JPL
691937	2014 SN_{72}	—	September 6, 2014	Mount Lemmon	Mount Lemmon Survey	WIT	820 m	MPC · JPL
691938	2014 SA_{73}	—	February 14, 2012	Haleakala	Pan-STARRS 1	·	2.0 km	MPC · JPL
691939	2014 SZ_{73}	—	September 18, 2014	Haleakala	Pan-STARRS 1	·	1.0 km	MPC · JPL
691940	2014 SD_{74}	—	June 26, 2014	Haleakala	Pan-STARRS 1	(2076)	680 m	MPC · JPL
691941	2014 SS_{74}	—	October 10, 2004	Kitt Peak	Spacewatch	·	2.4 km	MPC · JPL
691942	2014 SF_{75}	—	February 7, 2011	Mount Lemmon	Mount Lemmon Survey	·	2.7 km	MPC · JPL
691943	2014 SN_{75}	—	June 5, 2013	Mount Lemmon	Mount Lemmon Survey	·	2.5 km	MPC · JPL
691944	2014 SG_{76}	—	August 28, 2014	Haleakala	Pan-STARRS 1	·	2.3 km	MPC · JPL
691945	2014 SV_{76}	—	March 25, 2007	Mount Lemmon	Mount Lemmon Survey	·	2.5 km	MPC · JPL
691946	2014 SQ_{77}	—	February 20, 2012	Haleakala	Pan-STARRS 1	·	2.5 km	MPC · JPL
691947	2014 SN_{78}	—	September 24, 2009	Mount Lemmon	Mount Lemmon Survey	·	2.1 km	MPC · JPL
691948	2014 SK_{89}	—	September 3, 2014	Kitt Peak	Spacewatch	VER	2.2 km	MPC · JPL
691949	2014 SX_{90}	—	September 18, 2014	Haleakala	Pan-STARRS 1	·	760 m	MPC · JPL
691950	2014 SM_{91}	—	November 18, 2009	Mount Lemmon	Mount Lemmon Survey	·	2.5 km	MPC · JPL
691951	2014 SS_{92}	—	March 28, 2012	Mount Lemmon	Mount Lemmon Survey	·	2.2 km	MPC · JPL
691952	2014 SW_{93}	—	June 7, 2013	Haleakala	Pan-STARRS 1	·	1.3 km	MPC · JPL
691953	2014 SY_{96}	—	April 10, 2013	Haleakala	Pan-STARRS 1	·	870 m	MPC · JPL
691954	2014 SG_{109}	—	August 27, 2009	Kitt Peak	Spacewatch	KOR	970 m	MPC · JPL
691955	2014 SS_{110}	—	June 1, 2013	Mount Lemmon	Mount Lemmon Survey	·	990 m	MPC · JPL
691956	2014 SB_{116}	—	March 30, 2004	Kitt Peak	Spacewatch	·	1.4 km	MPC · JPL
691957	2014 SD_{120}	—	October 16, 2009	Mount Lemmon	Mount Lemmon Survey	·	1.7 km	MPC · JPL
691958	2014 SW_{125}	—	September 18, 2014	Haleakala	Pan-STARRS 1	·	2.2 km	MPC · JPL
691959	2014 SL_{127}	—	March 30, 2012	Mount Lemmon	Mount Lemmon Survey	·	1.8 km	MPC · JPL
691960	2014 SZ_{129}	—	September 18, 2014	Haleakala	Pan-STARRS 1	·	970 m	MPC · JPL
691961	2014 SB_{130}	—	March 24, 2006	Mount Lemmon	Mount Lemmon Survey	·	2.2 km	MPC · JPL
691962	2014 SY_{135}	—	May 25, 2006	Mauna Kea	P. A. Wiegert	MAS	640 m	MPC · JPL
691963	2014 SH_{141}	—	September 5, 2007	Catalina	CSS	·	690 m	MPC · JPL
691964	2014 SA_{146}	—	August 27, 2014	Haleakala	Pan-STARRS 1	·	390 m	MPC · JPL
691965	2014 SN_{148}	—	September 20, 2008	Mount Lemmon	Mount Lemmon Survey	·	1.9 km	MPC · JPL
691966	2014 SA_{149}	—	July 7, 2014	Haleakala	Pan-STARRS 1	·	2.0 km	MPC · JPL
691967	2014 SV_{149}	—	July 7, 2014	Haleakala	Pan-STARRS 1	BRA	1.3 km	MPC · JPL
691968	2014 SR_{150}	—	July 31, 2014	Haleakala	Pan-STARRS 1	·	1.1 km	MPC · JPL
691969	2014 SQ_{156}	—	September 19, 2014	Haleakala	Pan-STARRS 1	·	820 m	MPC · JPL
691970	2014 SX_{157}	—	September 19, 2014	Haleakala	Pan-STARRS 1	·	2.8 km	MPC · JPL
691971	2014 SN_{160}	—	January 17, 2013	Haleakala	Pan-STARRS 1	T_{j} (2.99) · EUP	2.8 km	MPC · JPL
691972	2014 SC_{164}	—	September 19, 2014	Haleakala	Pan-STARRS 1	HYG	2.4 km	MPC · JPL
691973	2014 SE_{167}	—	November 24, 2009	Kitt Peak	Spacewatch	VER	2.0 km	MPC · JPL
691974	2014 SN_{167}	—	August 22, 2014	Haleakala	Pan-STARRS 1	·	1.6 km	MPC · JPL
691975	2014 SR_{169}	—	September 20, 2003	Palomar	NEAT	·	2.6 km	MPC · JPL
691976	2014 SF_{175}	—	December 4, 2010	Mount Lemmon	Mount Lemmon Survey	HOF	2.0 km	MPC · JPL
691977	2014 SL_{177}	—	January 19, 2012	Mount Lemmon	Mount Lemmon Survey	MAS	580 m	MPC · JPL
691978	2014 SF_{179}	—	August 20, 2014	Haleakala	Pan-STARRS 1	V	470 m	MPC · JPL
691979	2014 SA_{180}	—	July 31, 2014	Haleakala	Pan-STARRS 1	V	510 m	MPC · JPL
691980	2014 SG_{181}	—	February 4, 2006	Mount Lemmon	Mount Lemmon Survey	·	2.2 km	MPC · JPL
691981	2014 SK_{181}	—	November 11, 2010	Mount Lemmon	Mount Lemmon Survey	·	1.6 km	MPC · JPL
691982	2014 SC_{182}	—	October 31, 2010	Mount Lemmon	Mount Lemmon Survey	(5)	620 m	MPC · JPL
691983	2014 SU_{183}	—	April 7, 2013	Kitt Peak	Spacewatch	·	880 m	MPC · JPL
691984	2014 SN_{187}	—	March 8, 2013	Haleakala	Pan-STARRS 1	·	800 m	MPC · JPL
691985	2014 SL_{188}	—	September 17, 2009	Mount Lemmon	Mount Lemmon Survey	·	2.3 km	MPC · JPL
691986	2014 SU_{189}	—	March 29, 2008	Kitt Peak	Spacewatch	HOF	2.4 km	MPC · JPL
691987	2014 SL_{192}	—	October 7, 2007	Mount Lemmon	Mount Lemmon Survey	·	1.0 km	MPC · JPL
691988	2014 ST_{192}	—	April 19, 2013	Mount Lemmon	Mount Lemmon Survey	TIR	2.2 km	MPC · JPL
691989	2014 SU_{193}	—	July 31, 2014	Haleakala	Pan-STARRS 1	·	1.6 km	MPC · JPL
691990	2014 SR_{195}	—	September 7, 2008	Mount Lemmon	Mount Lemmon Survey	·	2.7 km	MPC · JPL
691991	2014 SQ_{200}	—	April 26, 2006	Kitt Peak	Spacewatch	·	3.4 km	MPC · JPL
691992	2014 SS_{203}	—	October 19, 2007	Kitt Peak	Spacewatch	·	880 m	MPC · JPL
691993	2014 SS_{207}	—	March 29, 2011	Mount Lemmon	Mount Lemmon Survey	·	1.9 km	MPC · JPL
691994	2014 ST_{211}	—	September 23, 2008	Mount Lemmon	Mount Lemmon Survey	VER	2.6 km	MPC · JPL
691995	2014 SS_{216}	—	October 11, 2010	Mayhill-ISON	L. Elenin	·	1.1 km	MPC · JPL
691996	2014 SZ_{218}	—	September 20, 2014	Haleakala	Pan-STARRS 1	·	1.1 km	MPC · JPL
691997	2014 SF_{220}	—	June 18, 2013	Haleakala	Pan-STARRS 1	·	2.6 km	MPC · JPL
691998	2014 SO_{221}	—	November 23, 2009	Kitt Peak	Spacewatch	·	2.9 km	MPC · JPL
691999	2014 SN_{224}	—	November 18, 2006	Kitt Peak	Spacewatch	·	1.2 km	MPC · JPL
692000	2014 SQ_{226}	—	December 6, 2010	Mount Lemmon	Mount Lemmon Survey	·	1.5 km	MPC · JPL

back to top
