= C/2009 P1 (Garradd) =

Hyperbolic comet

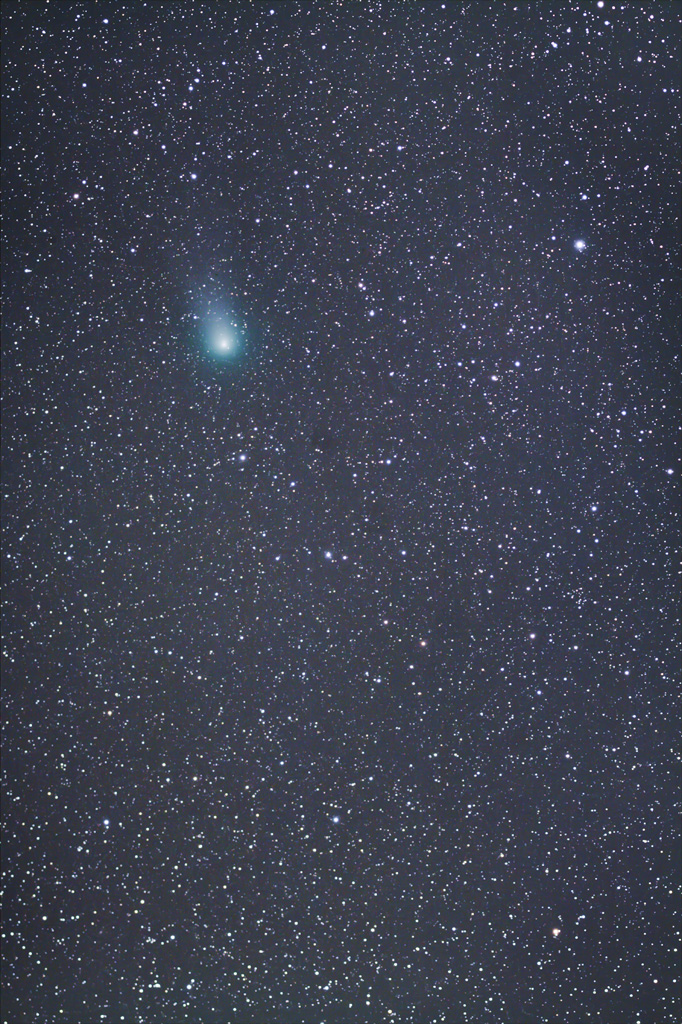
- Comet C/2009 P1 (Garradd) imaged from Italy on 23 September 2011

Discovery
- Discovered by: Gordon J. Garradd
- Discovery site: Siding Spring Observatory
- Discovery date: 10 August 2009

Orbital characteristics
- Epoch: 22 November 2011 (JD 2455887.5)
- Observation arc: 5.42 years
- Earliest precovery date: 27 September 2008
- Number of observations: 9,044
- Aphelion: ~4,770 AU (inbound); ~12,000 AU (outbound)
- Perihelion: 1.551 AU
- Eccentricity: 0.99935 (inbound); 0.99974 (outbound)
- Orbital period: ~116,000 years (inbound); ~462,000 years (outbound)
- Inclination: 106.18°
- Longitude of ascending node: 325.99°
- Argument of periapsis: 90.747°
- Mean anomaly: –0.0005°
- Last perihelion: 23 December 2011
- T_{Jupiter}: –0.432
- Earth MOID: 1.253 AU
- Jupiter MOID: 1.307 AU

Physical characteristics
- Dimensions: 3.2–6.8 km (2.0–4.2 mi)
- Mean diameter: 5.0 km (3.1 mi)
- Mean density: 450±60 kg/m^{3}
- Synodic rotation period: 11.0±0.8 hours
- Comet total magnitude (M1): 8.8
- Apparent magnitude: 5.8 (2012 apparition)

Comet Garradd, formal designation C/2009 P1, is a non-periodic comet that was observed between September 2008 and March 2013. It is one of 17 comets discovered by Australian astronomer, Gordon J. Garradd.

== Physical characteristics ==
Ultraviolet observations from the Swift Observatory revealed that the comet lost about 4.0×10^{11} kg of ice and dust during its most recent apparition. It was previously described as having one of the highest dust-to-gas ratios ever observed from a comet since Hale–Bopp in 1997.

Optical spectrometer observations conducted at SAO revealed molecular emissions of organic chemicals, particularly diatomic carbon (C_{2}) and tricarbon (C_{3}), cyanogens (CN and CN_{2}), hydrocarbons (CH and CH+), and carbon monoxide (CO+), within the comet's coma, where the gas production rate of C_{2} and C_{3} atoms were measured at 4.84×10^{26} and 2.16×10^{25} mol/sec, respectively.

The nucleus of C/2009 P1 (Garradd) is estimated to have an effective diameter of 5.0 km (3.1 mi), rotating once around its axis every 11.0±0.8 hours.
