= 259P/Garradd =

Periodic comet and active asteroid

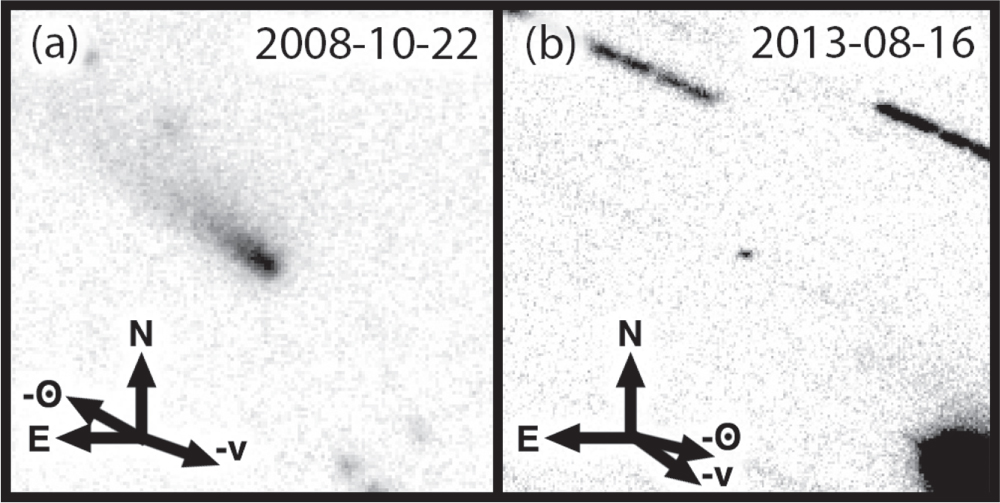
- Comet 259P/Garradd in two different dates, one that was active (left) and one in which it appears inactive (right)

Discovery
- Discovered by: Gordon J. Garradd
- Discovery site: Siding Spring Observatory
- Discovery date: 2 September 2008

Designations
- MPC designation: P/2008 R1
- Alternative designations: Garradd 4

Orbital characteristics
- Epoch: 26 July 2017 (JD 2457960.5)
- Observation arc: 17.86 years (Note: Observation arc from the JPL Small-Body Database covering dates from 2 September 2008 until 12 July 2026.)
- Number of observations: 77
- Aphelion: 3.654 AU
- Perihelion: 1.809 AU
- Semi-major axis: 2.731 AU
- Eccentricity: 0.33771
- Orbital period: 4.514 years
- Inclination: 15.889°
- Longitude of ascending node: 51.484°
- Argument of periapsis: 257.50°
- Mean anomaly: 358.03°
- Last perihelion: 11 August 2026
- Next perihelion: ~2031
- T_{Jupiter}: 3.217
- Earth MOID: 0.858 AU
- Jupiter MOID: 1.925 AU

Physical characteristics
- Mean radius: 0.30 ± 0.02 km (0.186 ± 0.012 mi)
- Geometric albedo: 0.05 (assumed)
- Comet total magnitude (M1): 13.7
- Comet nuclear magnitude (M2): 18.9

259P/Garradd is an Encke-type comet and active asteroid with an orbital period of 4.5 years. It was discovered in images obtained on 2 September 2008 as part of the Siding Spring Survey by Gordon J. Garradd.

== Physical characteristics ==
The comet upon discovery had an apparent magnitude of 18.5 and a coma about 15 arcseconds across. The comet dimmed by 1.5 magnitudes until mid November 2008. The spectrum of the comet during that period indicated a lack of gaseous emission lines and the mass loss rate was estimated to be less than 1.5 kg/s. The comet was observed in 2011-12, when it was inactive, with the observations indicating an effective radius of about 0.3 km (0.19 mi) assuming a geometric albedo of 0.05.

The comet was observed to be active again during the 2017 perihelion, indicating that the source of activity is sublimation. The activity started to be detected when the comet was about 2 AU from the Sun, indicating that volatile ices are located deeper under the surface, as they have been probably more depleted due to the fact that it approaches closer to the Sun during perihelion than other active asteroids. Its reactivation of activity in 2026 further solidify its status as a main-belt comet.

== Orbit ==
The orbit of the comet is unstable within a timescale of tens of millions years. It lies near the 3:8 orbital resonance with Jupiter. It has a Jupiter Tisserand parameter of over three, indicating that it originates from the main asteroid belt instead of the Kuiper belt. It does not belong to a known asteroid family.

== Notes ==
Numbered comets
Previous; 258P/PANSTARRS	259P/Garradd	Next; 260P/McNaught
