= Gordon J. Garradd =

Australian astronomer and photographer

Minor planets discovered: 31
6027 Waratah	23 September 1993	IAU
(6874) 1994 JO1	9 May 1994	MPC
(8201) 1994 AH2	5 January 1994	MPC
(10150) 1994 PN	7 August 1994	MPC
(10180) 1996 EE_{2}	15 March 1996	MPC
(10578) 1995 LH	5 June 1995	MPC
(10824) 1993 SW_{3}	24 September 1993	MPC
(14916) 1993 VV_{7}	10 November 1993	MPC
(14921) 1994 QA	16 August 1994	MPC
(23621) 1996 PA	5 August 1996	MPC
(24814) 1994 VW_{1}	10 November 1994	MPC
(26895) 1995 MC	23 June 1995	MPC
(30956) 1994 QP	27 August 1994	MPC
(37651) 1994 GX	3 April 1994	MPC
(55820) 1995 FW	25 March 1995	MPC
(55843) 1996 PD_{1}	9 August 1996	MPC
61342 Lovejoy	3 August 2000	MPC
(65757) 1994 FV	21 March 1994	MPC
(69350) 1993 YP	17 December 1993	MPC
(69357) 1994 FU	21 March 1994	MPC
(96298) 1996 RE_{26}	9 September 1996	MPC
(100210) 1994 LD_{1}	15 June 1994	MPC
(100211) 1994 PF_{1}	7 August 1994	MPC
(100244) 1994 QB	16 August 1994	MPC
(102530) 1999 UF_{4}	30 October 1999	MPC
(123302) 2000 UW_{112}	19 October 2000	MPC
(162037) 1996 BW_{3}	26 January 1996	MPC
(178680) 2000 RB_{9}	2 September 2000	MPC
(228215) 1996 DD_{2}	26 February 1996	MPC
(412983) 1996 FO_{3}	24 March 1996	MPC

Gordon John Garradd (/ˈɡærəd/; born 1959) is an Australian amateur astronomer and photographer from Loomberah, New South Wales. He has discovered numerous asteroids and comets, including the hyperbolic comet C/2009 P1, and four novae in the Large Magellanic Cloud. The asteroid and Mars-crosser, 5066 Garradd, was named in his honour.

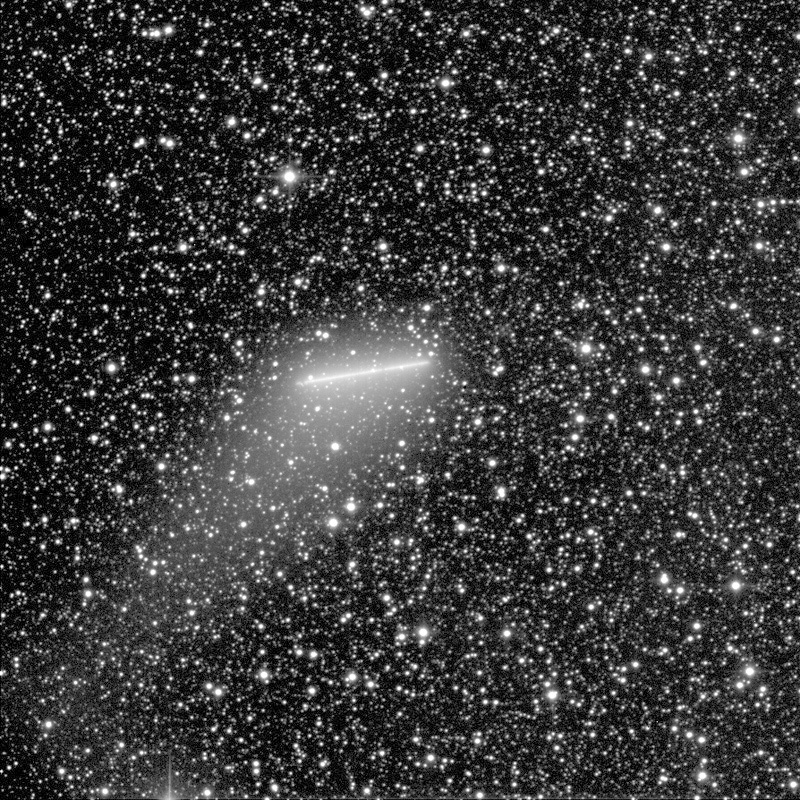
Comet C/2009 P1 (Garradd)

He has worked for a number of astronomical institutions in the US and Australia, most recently at Siding Spring Observatory on the Siding Spring Survey, part of the NASA-funded Catalina Sky Survey for near-Earth objects (2002–2011). As of 2016, the Minor Planet Center credits him with the discovery of 31 minor planets (see table). There are 16 comets and an asteroid that bear his name. His cometary discoveries include 186P/Garradd (comet Garradd 1), a Jupiter-family comet, and 259P/Garradd (comet Garradd 4), an Encke-type comet.

Garradd was born in Australia and lived his early life in Sydney, Canberra, Oberon, and Tamworth. Astronomy has been an interest since his childhood, and he has built many telescopes himself, starting with a 20 cm (8") f/7 Newtonian while still in high school, graduating to making mirrors up to 46 cm (18″) diameter and mounts up to the fork mount for the 46 cm f/5.4 Newtonian, and German equatorial mounted 25 cm (10") f/4.1 that he used for observing near-Earth asteroids and comets.

His initial profession was as an accountant, but he left that in 1984 to pursue astronomy and photography full-time. He lives with his wife Hether, off the power grid, using solar and wind power. He is a photographer, mountain bike rider, and solar- and wind-power enthusiast.
