= Lovejoy =

Lovejoy may refer to:

- Lovejoy (TV series) a British television series starring Ian McShane
- Lovejoy (novel series), a series of novels by Jonathon Gash, from which the television series was adapted

== Places ==
- Lovejoy, California
- Lovejoy, Georgia
- Lovejoy, Illinois or Brooklyn
- Lovejoy Lake, a lake in Minnesota
- Lovejoy, Missouri

== Comets ==
- C/2007 K5 (Lovejoy), a comet discovered in 2007
- C/2007 E2 (Lovejoy), a comet discovered in 2007
- C/2011 W3 (Lovejoy), a comet discovered in 2011 which was noted for its pass through the Sun's corona
- C/2013 R1 (Lovejoy), a comet visible to the naked eye in 2013
- C/2014 Q2 (Lovejoy), a comet discovered in 2014
- C/2017 E4 (Lovejoy), a comet discovered in 2017 by Terry Lovejoy

== Other uses ==
- Lovejoy (surname)
- A Lovejoy, a 2016 album by Omar Rodríguez-López
- Lovejoy (album)
- Lovejoy (band), English indie rock band

== See also ==
- Lovejoy coupling, a power transmission coupling
- Battle of Lovejoy’s Station in the American Civil War
- East Lovejoy, Buffalo, New York
