= Comet Lovejoy =

Comet Lovejoy may refer to any comets below discovered by Terry Lovejoy:

- C/2007 E2 (Lovejoy), a comet discovered in March 2007
- C/2007 K5 (Lovejoy), a comet discovered in May 2007
- C/2011 W3 (Lovejoy), a comet discovered in 2011, noted for its pass through the Sun's corona
- C/2013 R1 (Lovejoy), a comet discovered and visible to the naked eye in 2013
- C/2014 Q2 (Lovejoy), a comet discovered in 2014
- C/2017 E4 (Lovejoy), a comet discovered in 2017
