= C/2024 G3 (ATLAS) =

Great Comet of 2025

C/2024 G3 (ATLAS) (Great Comet of 2025)
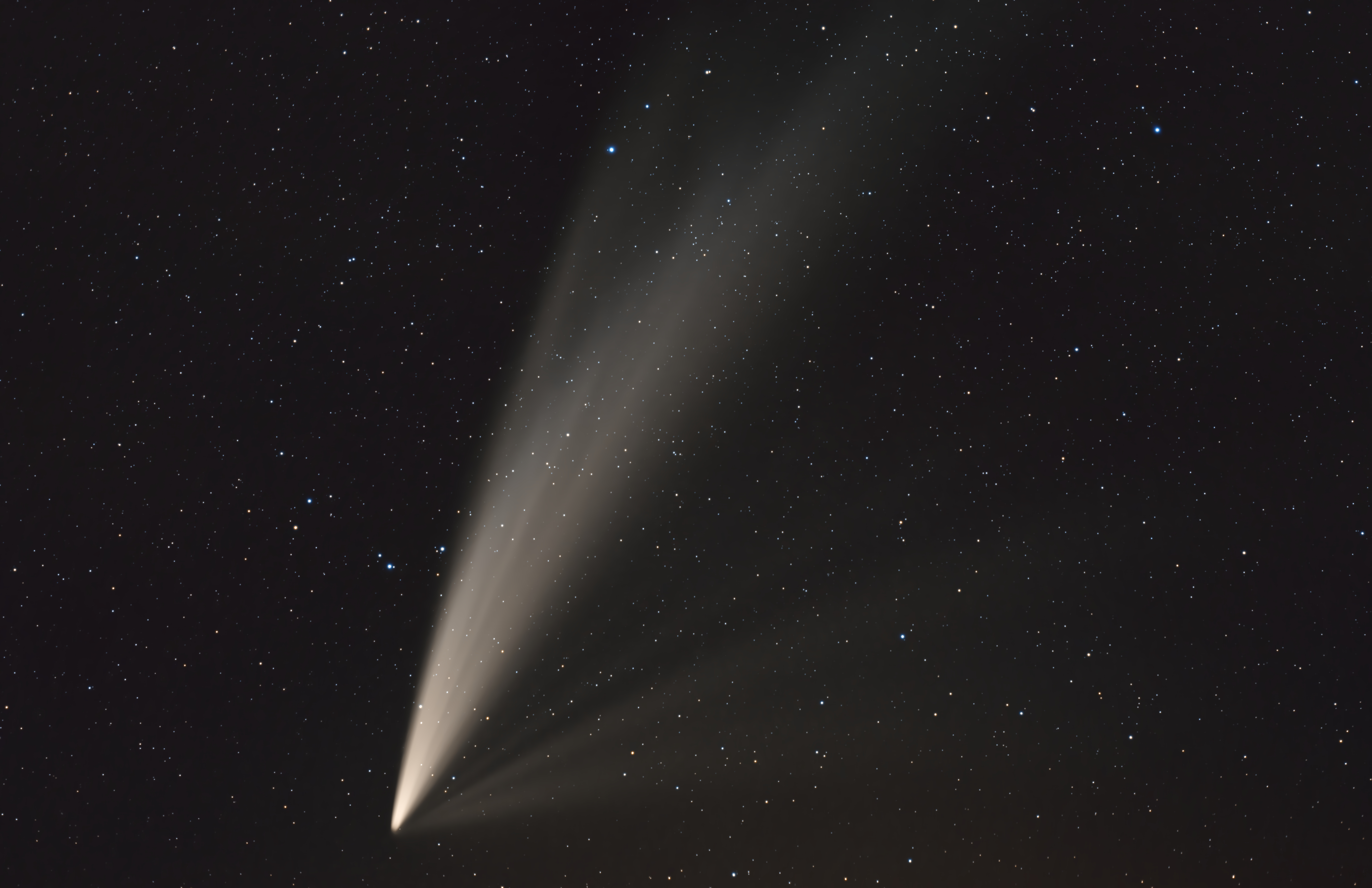
- Comet ATLAS photographed from the Paranal Observatory on 25 January 2025

Discovery
- Discovery site: ATLAS–CHL (W68)
- Discovery date: 5 April 2024

Orbital characteristics
- Epoch: Present: 16 June 2024 (JD 2460477.5); Inbound: 1 January 1800 (JD 2378496.5); Outbound: 1 January 2200 (JD 2524593.5)
- Observation arc: 271 days
- Number of observations: 299
- Aphelion: 6,391 AU (Inbound); 14,234 AU (Outbound)
- Perihelion: 0.093 AU
- Semi-major axis: 3,196 AU (Inbound); 7,117 AU (Outbound)
- Eccentricity: 0.999970 (Inbound); 1.000013 (Present); 0.999987 (Outbound)
- Orbital period: ≈180,000 years (Inbound) ≈600,000 years (Outbound)
- Inclination: 116.851°
- Longitude of ascending node: 220.331°
- Argument of periapsis: 108.125°
- Mean anomaly: –0.0003°
- Last perihelion: 13 January 2025
- Next perihelion: Disintegrated
- Earth MOID: 0.482 AU
- Jupiter MOID: 3.837 AU

Physical characteristics
- Comet total magnitude (M1): 7.6
- Comet nuclear magnitude (M2): 12.4
- Apparent magnitude: –3.8 (2025 apparition)

C/2024 G3 (ATLAS) is a partially disintegrated non-periodic comet, which reached perihelion on 13 January 2025, at a distance of 0.09 AU (13 million km) from the Sun. Dubbed the Great Comet of 2025, it was the brightest comet of 2025, with an apparent magnitude reaching −3.8 on the day of its perihelion. The comet was visible in the southern hemisphere before and after perihelion. It was only observed in the daytime sky around perihelion in the northern hemisphere.

== Observational history ==
The comet was discovered by the Asteroid Terrestrial-impact Last Alert System (ATLAS) survey on 5 April 2024, in images obtained with a 0.5-m reflector telescope located in Río Hurtado, Chile. The comet at the time was a magnitude 19 object about 4.38 AU (655 million km) from Earth. Further observations indicated it had a diffuse coma about 4.5 arcseconds across and a straight tail.

By 30 October 2024, the comet had an apparent magnitude of 11.9 per reported observations at the Comet Observation Database (COBS), visible with large telescopes. By mid December 2024 it had brightened to 8th magnitude and was located in Scorpius, visible at dawn in the southern and equatorial regions. By the end of the month, its magnitude was reported to be between 5 and 5.5, having a coma about two arcminutes across and a tail up to 18 arcminutes long.

On 2 January 2025, Terry Lovejoy reported that the comet experienced an outburst, estimating its magnitude to be 3.7 photographically and 3.2 visually. On 3 January the comet had brightened to a magnitude of 2–2.4. The comet was reported to have a nuclear shadow, a dark lane in the tail, and was marginally visible with naked eye on that day. On 7 January the comet was reported to be of first magnitude, with a tail about 20 arcminutes long. The comet was photographed by cosmonaut Ivan Vagner onboard the International Space Station on 10 January. The comet was also observed aboard the station by astronaut Donald Pettit on the following day.

The comet entered the field of view of the LASCO C3 coronograph on SOHO on 11 January and was visible until 15 January. In case of this comet, it was very difficult to predict peak brightness (spread more than 10 mag). G. van Buitenen predicted −4 magnitude, accounting for forward scattering, however it was just 5 degrees from Sun at peak magnitude. The comet became bright enough to photograph in broad daylight, and was reported to be visible with the naked eye. This made the comet the fifth comet in the last 100 years to have been observed in the daylight with the naked eye, joining Skjellerup-Maristany in 1927, Ikeya-Seki in 1965, West in 1976, and McNaught in 2007. After perihelion the comet headed southwards, while in mid northern latitudes was low, being 2 degrees above the horizon at the end of the civil twilight.

After perihelion the comet reappeared in the southern hemisphere. It became clearly visible with naked eye and on 18 January its tail was reported to be 4 degrees long, while its magnitude was estimated to be −0.9. However, on 19 January, Hungarian astrophotographer Lionel Majzik reported that a bright streamer appeared within the tail while its head became less prominent, indicating that the comet could have disintegrated. Reports of an earlier fragmentation event were recorded as early as 12 January, and while the exact cause of the comet's breakup were currently unknown, it is likely that intense solar heating during perihelion had caused jetting and outgassing from the nucleus, leading to its eventual fragmentation. Despite this, the comet retained the shape of its tail, now resulting in a "headless" comet similar to Comet Lovejoy in 2011.

John Bortle considers the comet due to its brightness and night time appearance as the Great Comet of 2025.

== Orbit ==
At the time of discovery, it was assumed that this was a new comet from the Oort cloud, and with an absolute magnitude (H=9), there was very little to no chance that it would survive perihelion. But as the orbit was refined, it was found to be likely a dynamically old comet, having made close approaches to the Sun before.

Some media report C/2024 G3 (ATLAS) approaches the Sun once every 160,000 years. However, according to long-term orbital calculations by the JPL Horizons On-Line Ephemeris System, after approach to the Sun in 2025, aphelion distance of the comet will be more than twice as far away as before, and its orbital period will be about 600,000 years.

== Physical characteristics ==
C/2024 G3 is the first known Oort cloud comet observed to have a significant trail of debris at perihelion, primarily due to its sodium emission and possibly composed of several subkilometer fragments that were formed while it was in the Oort cloud by Galactic tides that decelerated the comet itself. Additionally, alongside C/2020 F3 (NEOWISE) it has the strongest measured NaI and KI emission lines of any comet at distances greater than 0.4 AU (60 million km) from the Sun since Ikeya–Seki in 1965, where its NaI/KI ratio was measured to be at 26±8 for C/2024 G3.

The color of the comet's dust tail appeared to be different locally as it branches out into multiple parts, which was attributed to increasing solar pressure as it approached perihelion.

== Gallery ==
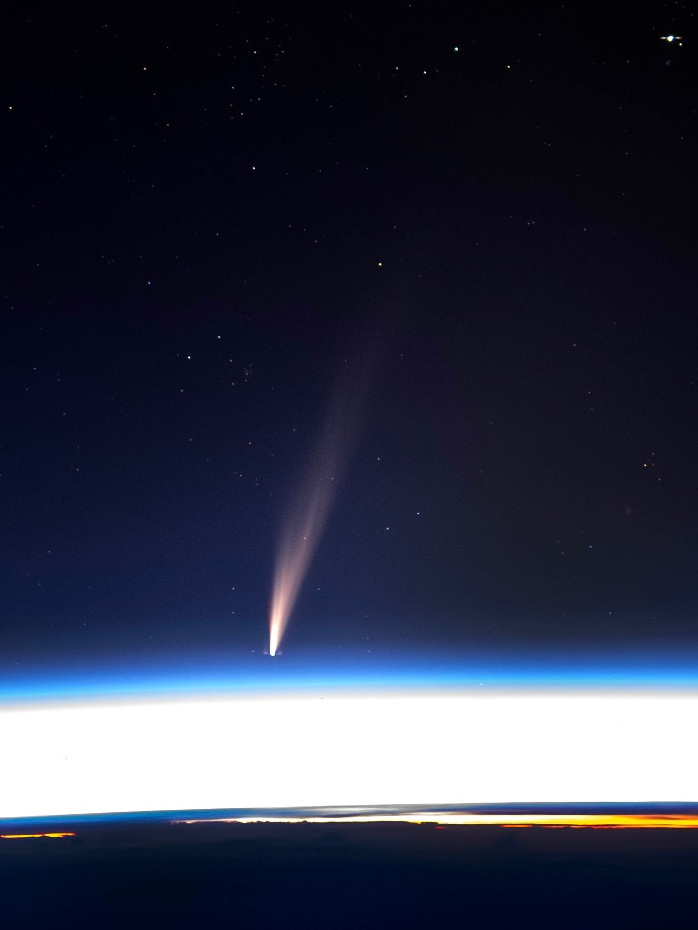
On 11 January, taken by Donald Pettit aboard the ISS.

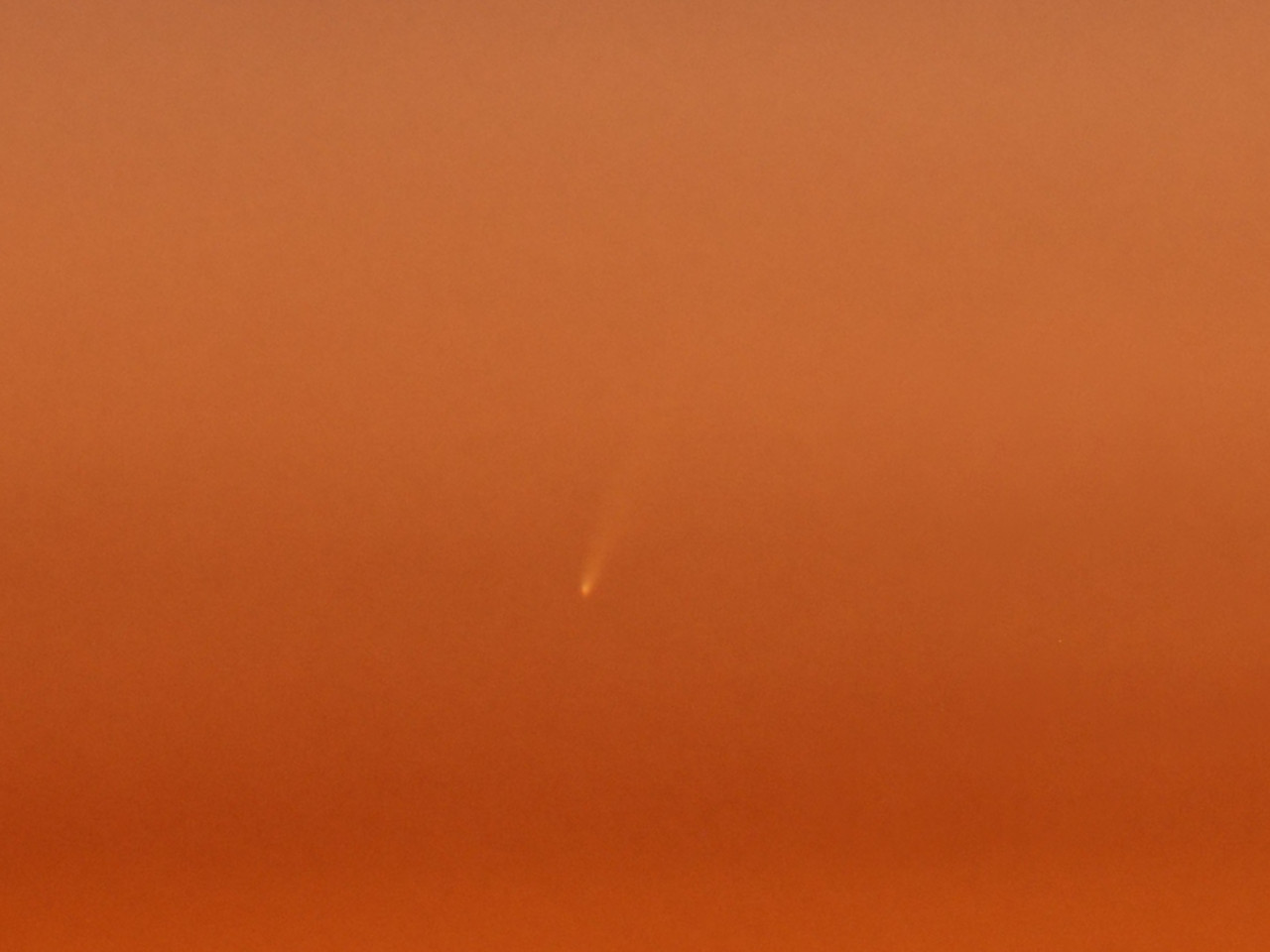
On 11 January from Crete, Greece.

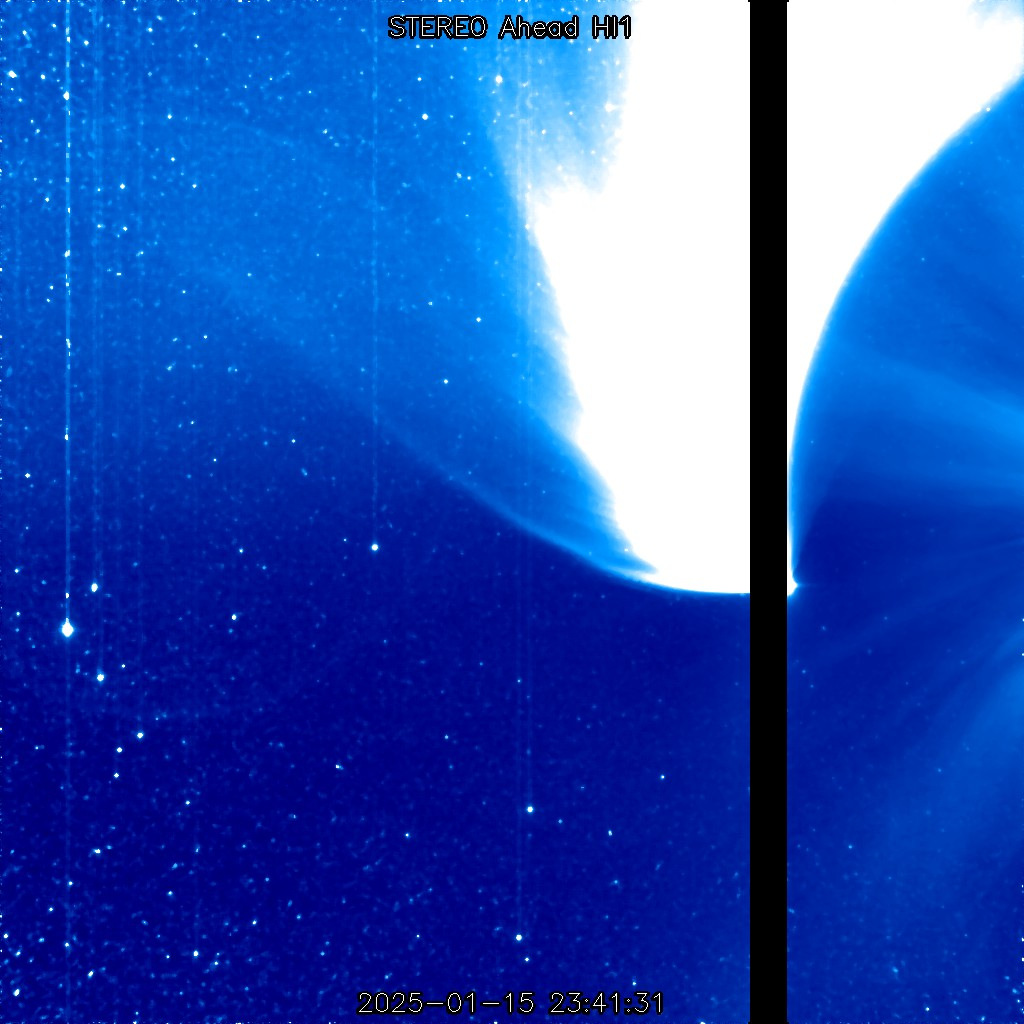
On 15 January taken by the STEREO-A probe.

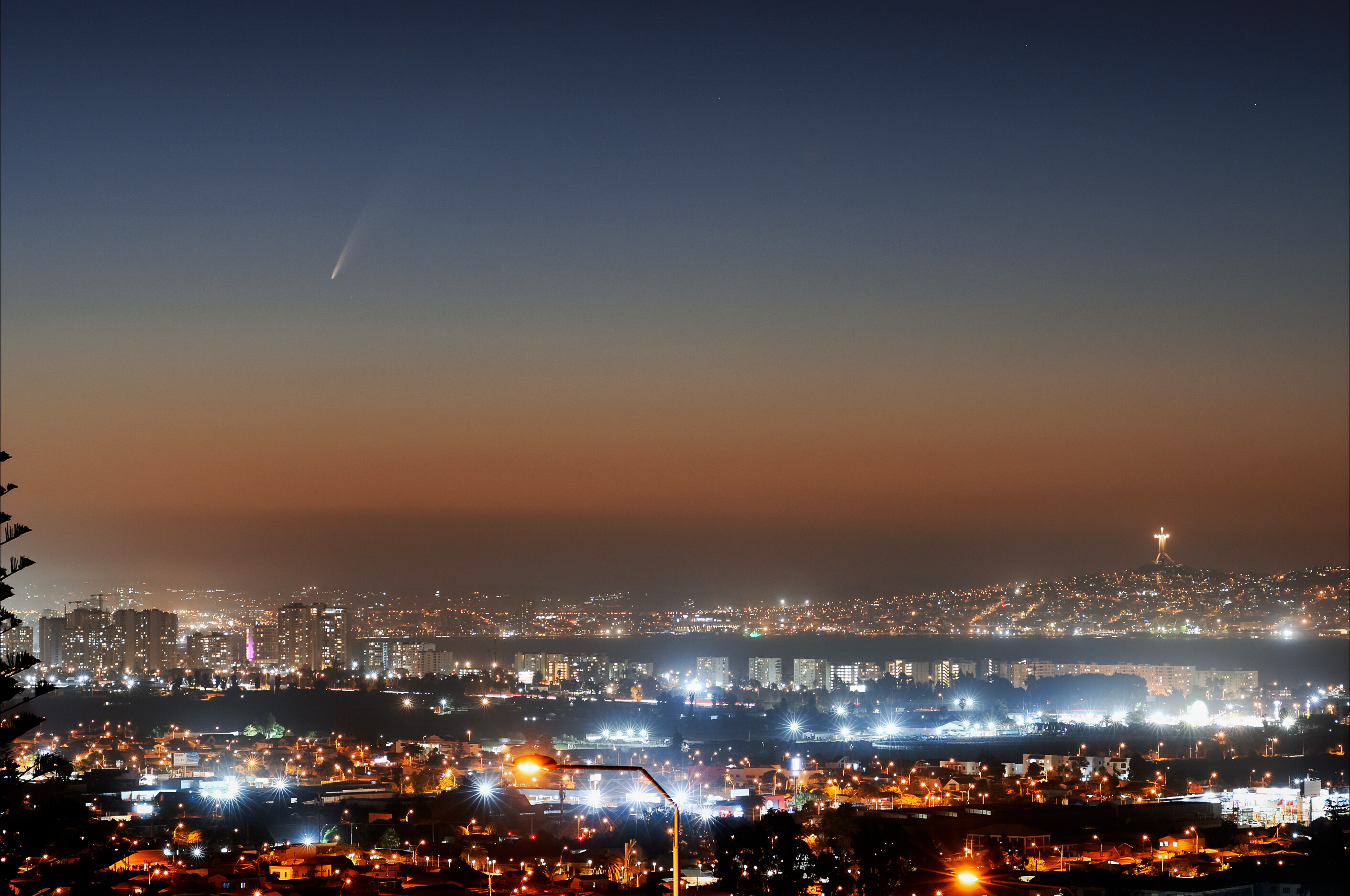
On 18 January from La Serena, Chile.

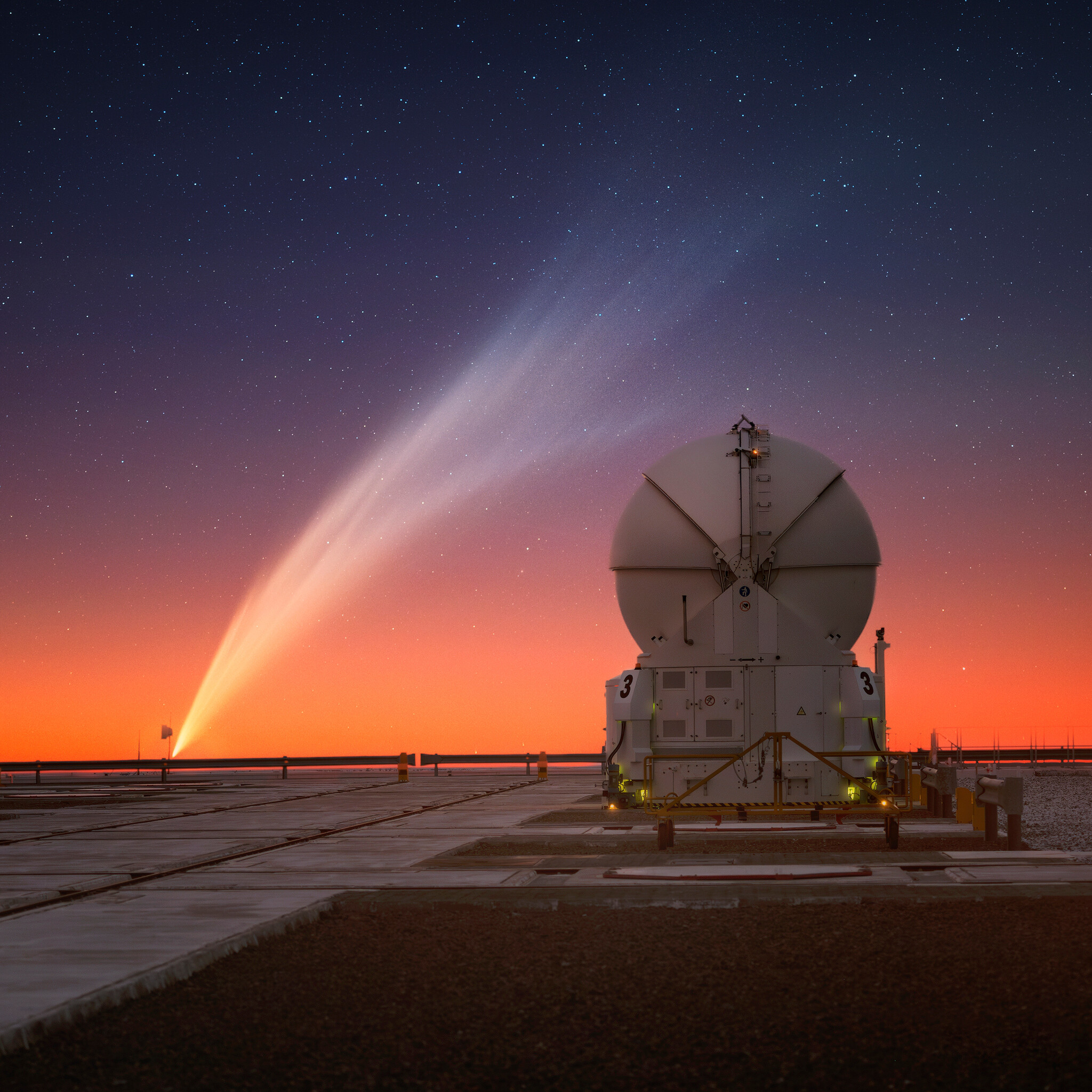
On 19 January from the Paranal Observatory, Chile.

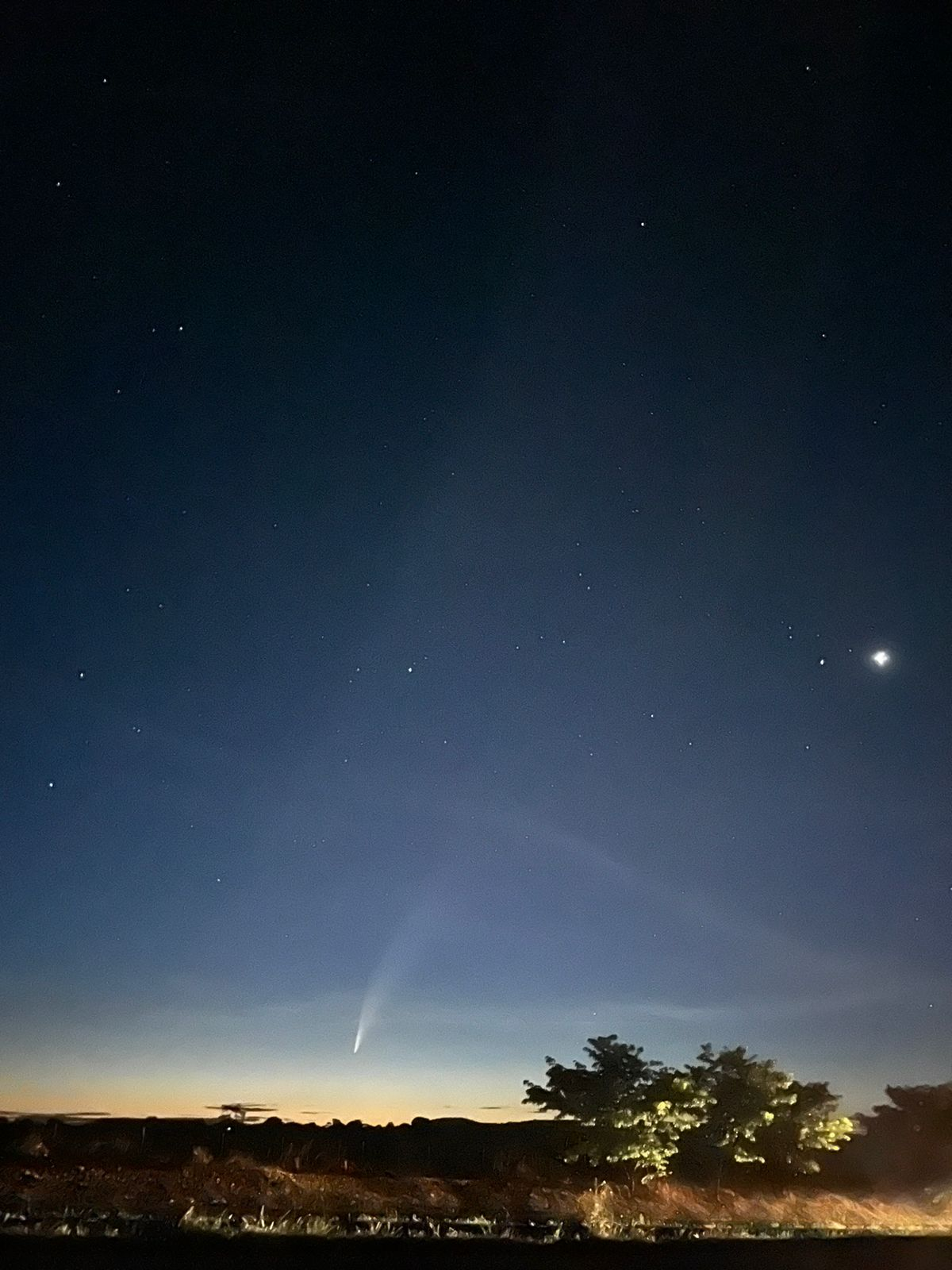
On 20 January from Itauçu, Brazil.

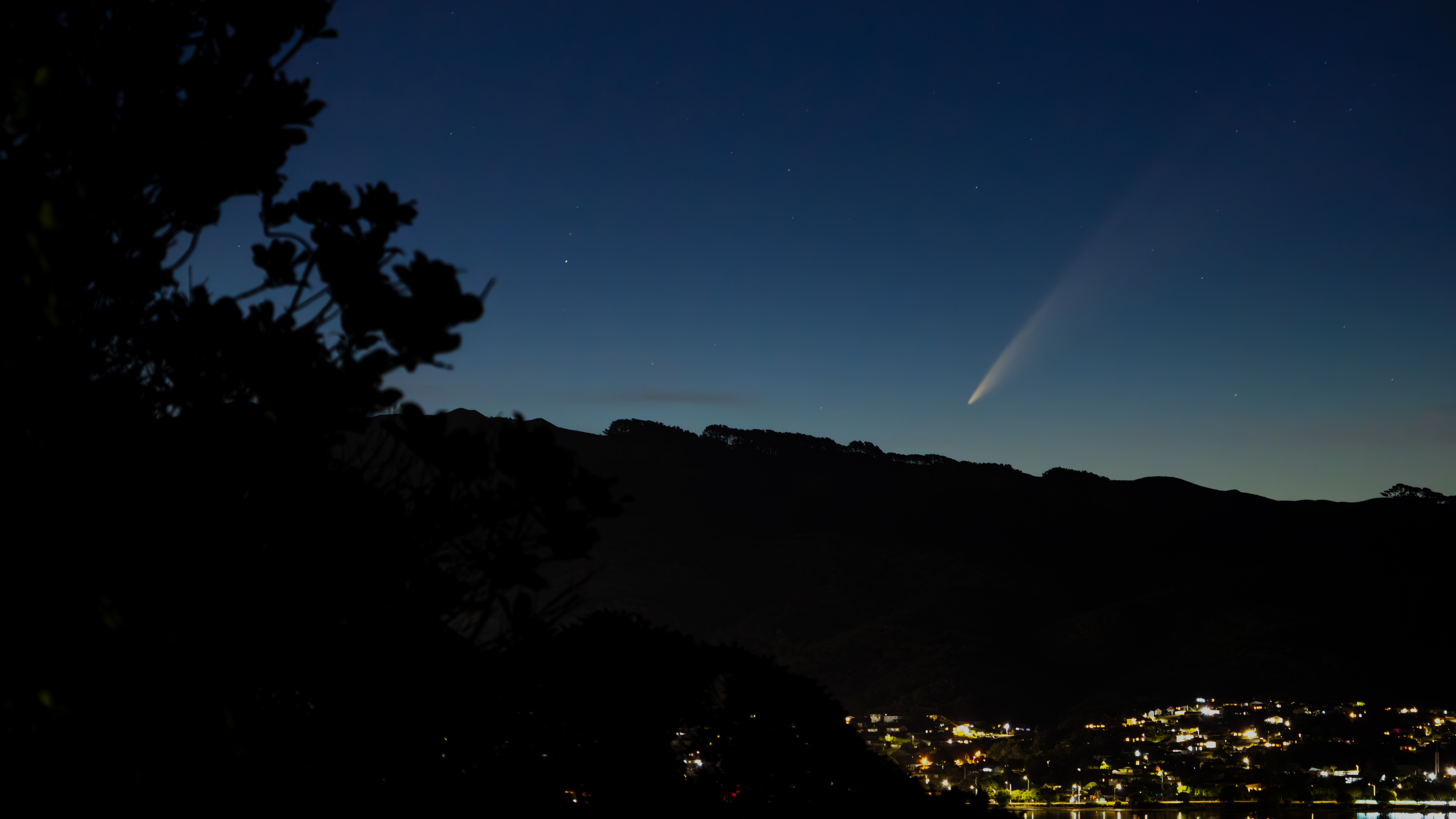
On 21 January from Porirua, New Zealand.

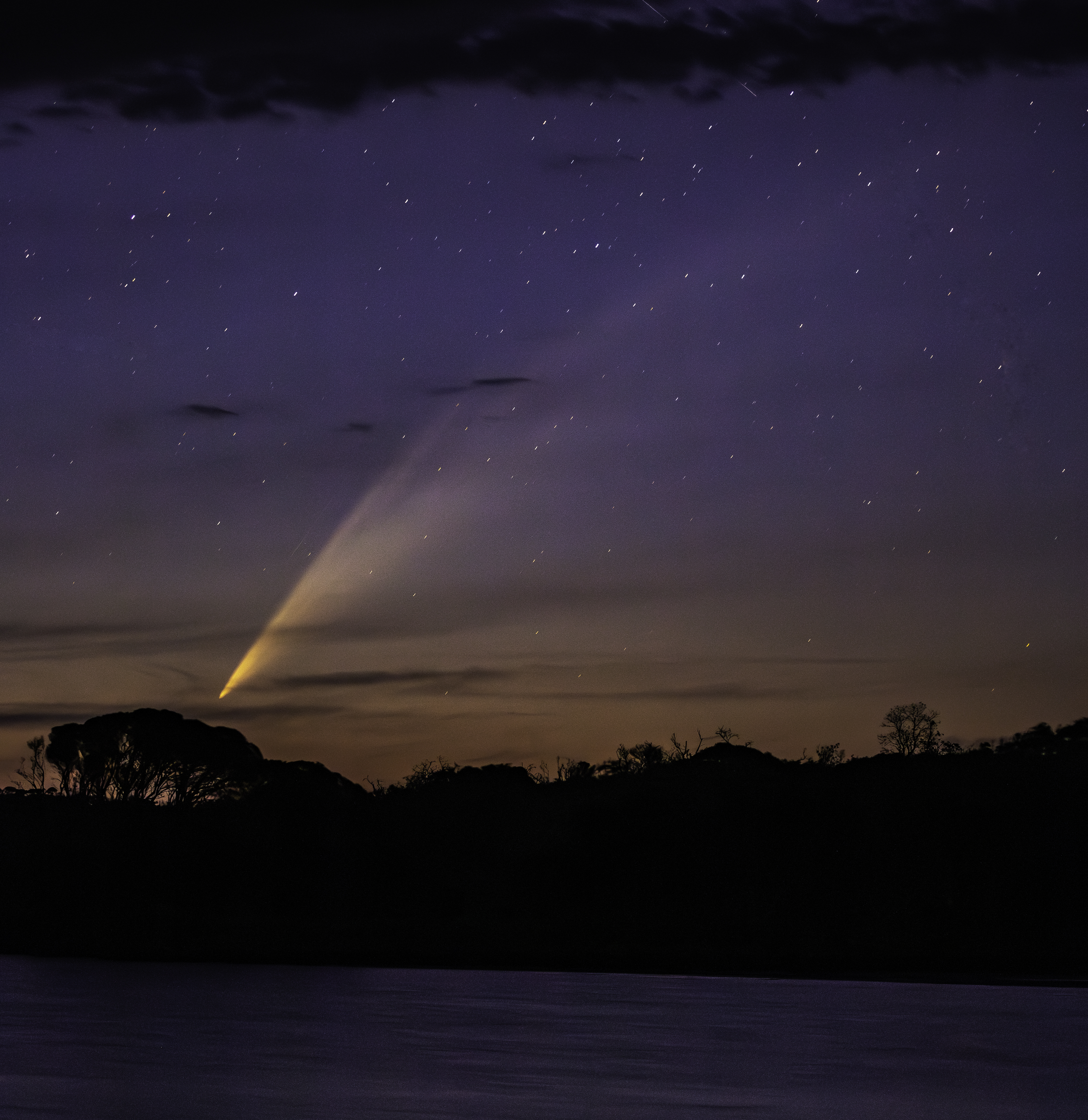
On 21 January from Mallacoota, Australia.

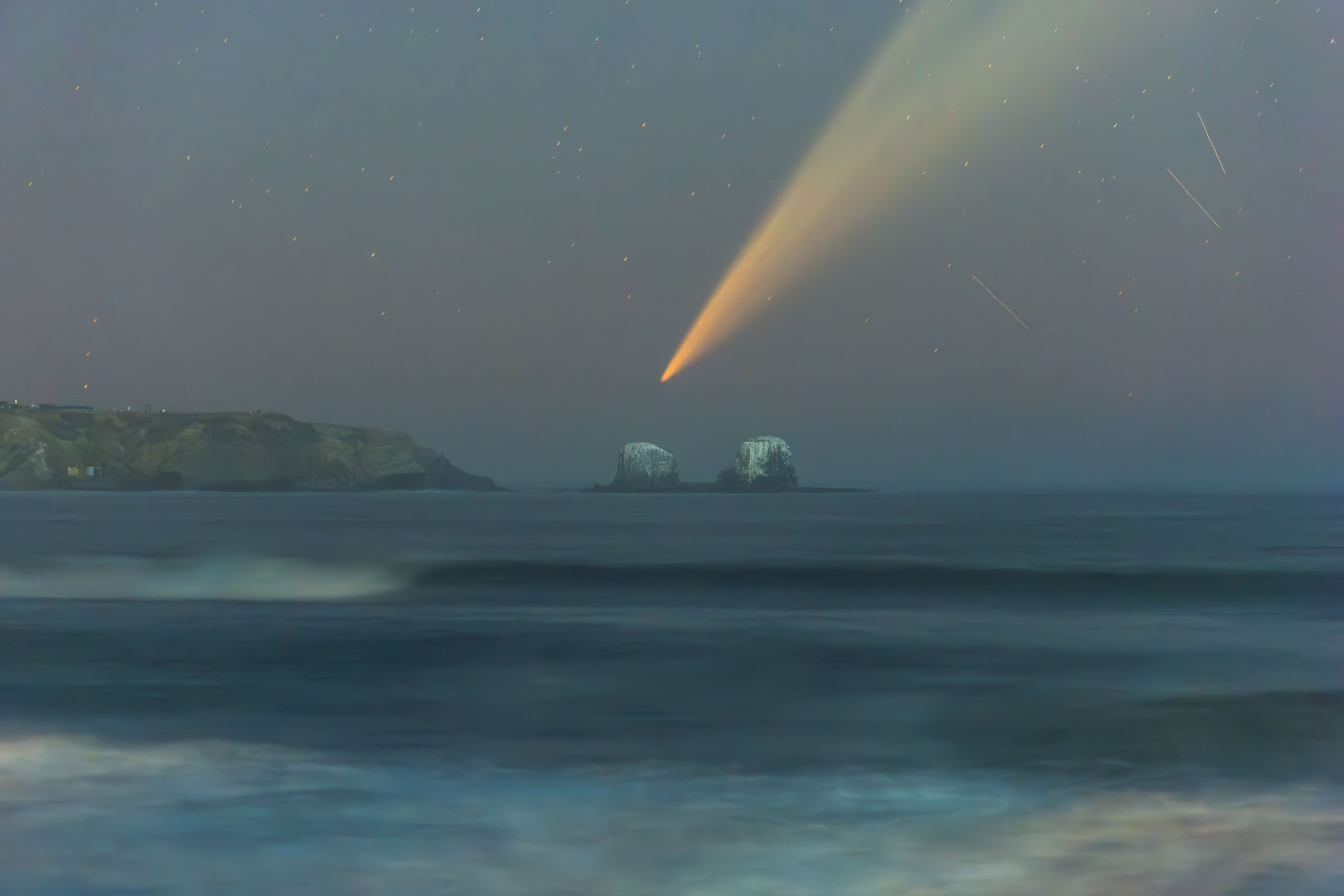
On 21 January from Punta de Lobos, Chile.

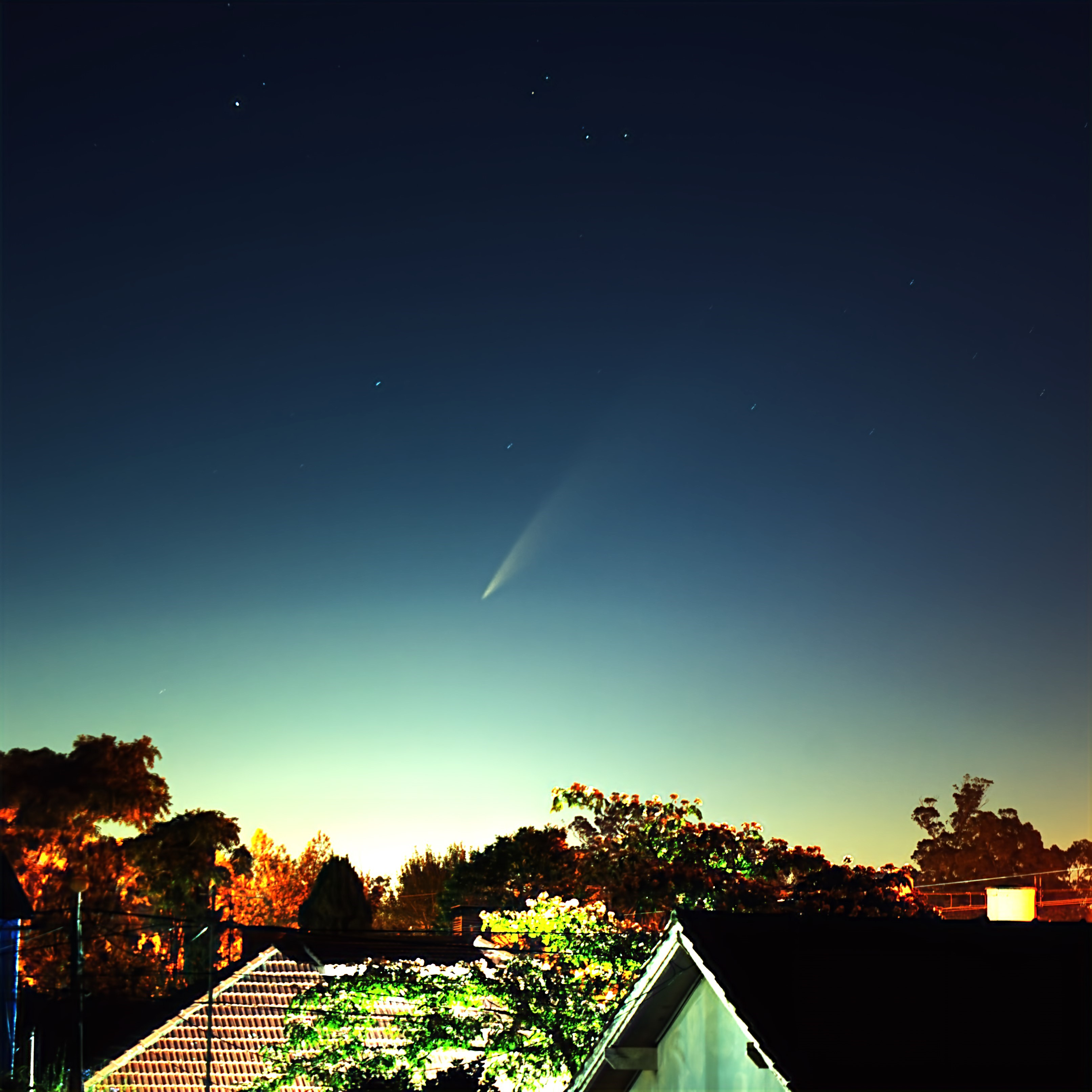
On 22 January from Mar del Plata, Argentina.

== See also ==
- C/1910 A1, the Great January Comet of 1910, also a daylight comet.
- C/1962 C1 (Seki–Lines), a bright comet that John Bortle compared its similarity in appearance to C/2024 G3.
- C/2011 W3 (Lovejoy), a bright Kreutz sungrazer comet that also disintegrated after perihelion.
- C/2023 A3 (Tsuchinshan–ATLAS), a comet that became visible to the naked eye about three months before C/2024 G3.
