= C/2013 R1 (Lovejoy) =

Non-periodic comet

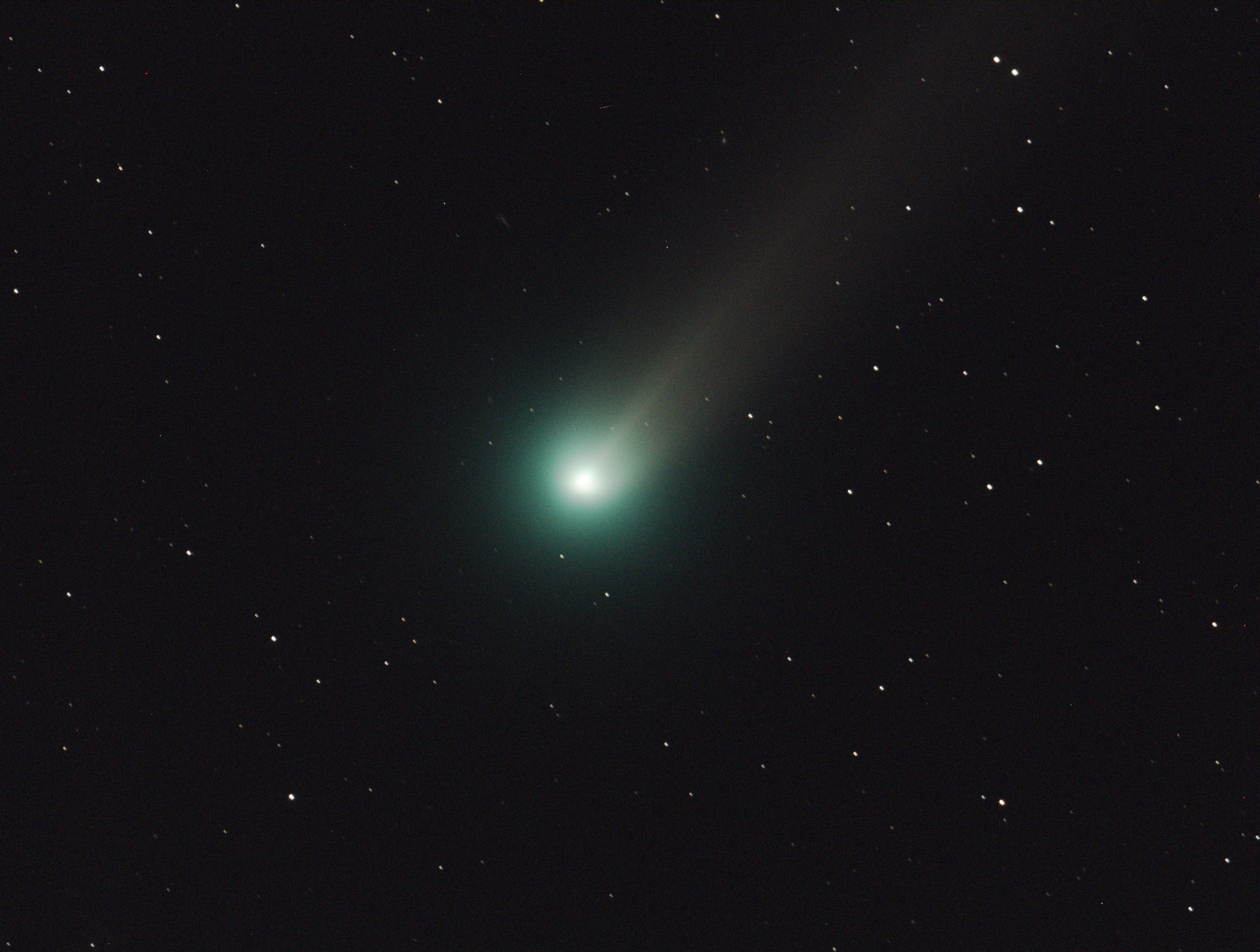
- C/2013 R1 (Lovejoy) from a 3-minute exposure taken using a 6" refractor on 28 November 2013

Discovery
- Discovered by: Terry Lovejoy
- Discovery site: Thornlands, Australia
- Discovery date: 7 September 2013

Designations
- Alternative designations: CK13R010

Orbital characteristics
- Epoch: 29 December 2013 (JD 2456655.5)
- Observation arc: 372 days (1.02 years)
- Number of observations: 3,894
- Aphelion: ~830 AU (outbound)
- Perihelion: 0.812 AU
- Eccentricity: 0.99843
- Orbital period: ~6,900 years (inbound); ~8,500 years (outbound)
- Inclination: 64.041°
- Longitude of ascending node: 70.711°
- Argument of periapsis: 67.166°
- Mean anomaly: 0.001°
- Last perihelion: 22 December 2013
- T_{Jupiter}: 0.499
- Earth MOID: 0.146 AU
- Jupiter MOID: 1.564 AU

Physical characteristics
- Mean radius: 1.266 ± 0.10 km (0.787 ± 0.062 mi)
- Mean density: 480±70 kg/m^{3}
- Synodic rotation period: 47.8±1.2 hours
- Comet total magnitude (M1): 11.5
- Apparent magnitude: 4.0 (2013 apparition)

C/2013 R1 (Lovejoy) is a non-periodic comet discovered on 7 September 2013 using a 0.2 m (7.9 in) Schmidt–Cassegrain telescope. It is the fourth comet discovered by Terry Lovejoy. It crossed the celestial equator on 14 October 2013, which made it better observed from the Northern Hemisphere.

== Observational history ==
By 1 November 2013, the comet was visible to the naked eye near the Beehive Cluster (M44), about halfway between Jupiter and Regulus. It became more impressive than C/2012 S1 (ISON). In binoculars, the comet has the appearance of a green, unresolved globular cluster.

C/2013 R1 made its closest approach to Earth on 19 November 2013 at a distance of 0.3967 AU (59.35 million km), and reached an apparent magnitude of about 4.5. On 27 November 2013 the comet was in the constellation of Canes Venatici, near the bottom of the handle of the Big Dipper. From 28 November until 4 December 2013, the comet was in the constellation Boötes. On 1 December 2013 it passed the star Beta Boötis. From 4 December until 12 December 2013, the comet was in the constellation Corona Borealis.

From 12 December until 14 January 2014, the comet was in the constellation Hercules. On 14 December 2013, it passed the star Zeta Herculis. The comet came to perihelion (closest approach to the Sun) on 22 December 2013 at a distance of 0.81 AU (121,000,000 km; 75,000,000 mi) from the Sun. At perihelion, the comet had an elongation of 51 degrees from the Sun. By September 2014, the comet had faded to magnitude 18.

== Physical characteristics ==
=== Chemical composition ===
Narrow-band spectroscopy of the comet in December 2013 revealed that the coma of C/2013 R1 has a relatively high abundance in H_{2}O and CO_{2} molecules. Additional photometry from TRAPPIST until July 2014 determined that the detected organic compounds on its coma (OH, NH, CN, C_{3}, and C_{2}) were partly caused by the breakdown of HCN outgassing from the comet.

Infrared observations from the Keck Observatory detected enriched amounts of CO, as well as hydrocarbons like CH_{4}, C_{2}H_{6}, and CH_{3}OH, indicating the variability of chemicals found in other Oort cloud comets. Other complex organic compounds, such as HCOOH, CH_{3}CHO, (CH_{2}OH)_{2} and NH_{2}CHO, were also detected from the comet.

=== Nucleus size and rotation ===
The nucleus of C/2013 R1 is estimated to be about 1.266±0.10 km in radius, with a low bulk density of roughly about 480±70 kg/m^{3}. Measurements of the dust emission structures around the comet determined that it has a rotation period about 47.8±1.2 hours in length.
