= Diatomic carbon =

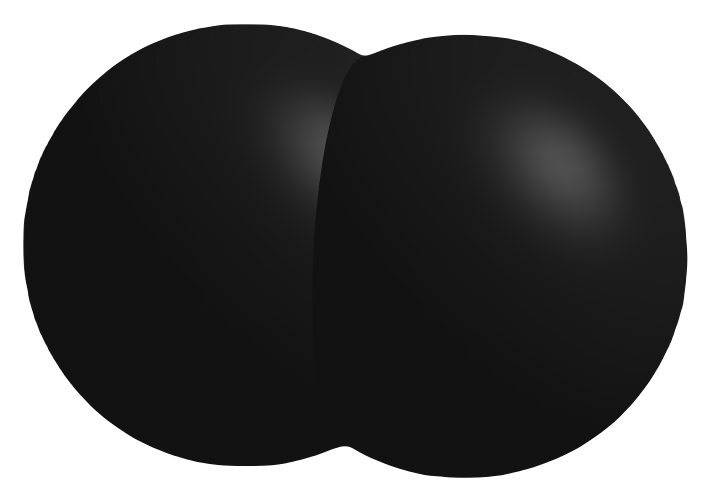

Names
- IUPAC name Diatomic carbon
- Systematic IUPAC name Ethenediylidene (substitutive); Dicarbon(C—C) (additive)

Identifiers
CAS Number	12070-15-4
3D model (JSmol)	Interactive image
ChEBI	CHEBI:30083
ChemSpider	122807
Gmelin Reference	196
PubChem CID	139247
CompTox Dashboard (EPA)	DTXSID101027115
- InChI: InChI=1S/C2/c1-2 Key: LBVWYGNGGJURHQ-UHFFFAOYSA-N
- SMILES: [C]=[C]

Properties
Chemical formula	C_{2}
Molar mass	24.022 g·mol^{−1}
- Except where otherwise noted, data are given for materials in their standard state (at 25 °C [77 °F], 100 kPa). Infobox references

Diatomic carbon (systematically named dicarbon and 1λ^{2},2λ^{2}-ethene), is a green, gaseous inorganic chemical with the chemical formula C=C (also written [C_{2}] or C_{2}). It is kinetically unstable at ambient temperature and pressure, being removed through autopolymerisation. It occurs in carbon vapor, for example in electric arcs; in comets, stellar atmospheres, and the interstellar medium; and in blue hydrocarbon flames. Diatomic carbon is the second simplest of the allotropes of carbon (after atomic carbon), and is an intermediate participant in the genesis of fullerenes.

== Properties ==
C_{2} is a component of carbon vapor. One paper estimates that carbon vapor is around 28% diatomic, but theoretically this depends on the temperature and pressure.

=== Electromagnetic properties ===
The electrons in diatomic carbon are distributed among the molecular orbitals according to the Aufbau principle to produce unique quantum states, with corresponding energy levels. The state with the lowest energy level, or ground state, is a singlet state (^{1}Σ^{+}_{g}), which is systematically named ethene-1,2-diylidene or dicarbon(0•). There are several excited singlet and triplet states that are relatively close in energy to the ground state, which form significant proportions of a sample of dicarbon under ambient conditions. When most of these excited states undergo photochemical relaxation, they emit in the infrared region of the electromagnetic spectrum. However, one state in particular emits in the green region. That state is a triplet state (^{3}Π_{g}), which is systematically named ethene-μ,μ-diyl-μ-ylidene or dicarbon(2•). In addition, there is an excited state somewhat further in energy from the ground state, which only form a significant proportion of a sample of dicarbon under mid-ultraviolet irradiation. Upon relaxation, this excited state fluoresces in the violet region and phosphoresces in the blue region. This state is also a singlet state (^{1}Π_{g}), which is also named ethene-μ,μ-diyl-μ-ylidene or dicarbon(2•).

State	Excitation enthalpy (kJ mol^{−1})	Relaxation transition	Relaxation wavelength	Relaxation EM-region
X^{1}Σ^{+}_{g}	0	–	–	–
a^{3}Π_{u}	8.5	a^{3}Π_{u}→X^{1}Σ^{+}_{g}	14.0 μm	Long-wavelength infrared
b^{3}Σ^{−}_{g}	77.0	b^{3}Σ^{−}_{g}→a^{3}Π_{u}	1.7 μm	Short-wavelength infrared
A^{1}Π_{u}	100.4	A^{1}Π_{u}→X^{1}Σ^{+}_{g} A^{1}Π_{u}→b^{3}Σ^{−}_{g}	1.2 μm 5.1 μm	Near infrared Mid-wavelength infrared
B^{1}Σ^{+}_{g}	?	B^{1}Σ^{+}_{g}→A^{1}Π_{u} B^{1}Σ^{+}_{g}→a^{3}Π_{u}	? ?	? ?
c^{3}Σ^{+}_{u}	159.3	c^{3}Σ^{+}_{u}→b^{3}Σ^{−}_{g} c^{3}Σ^{+}_{u}→X^{1}Σ^{+}_{g} c^{3}Σ^{+}_{u}→B^{1}Σ^{+}_{g}	1.5 μm 751.0 nm ?	Short-wavelength infrared Near infrared ?
d^{3}Π_{g}	239.5	d^{3}Π_{g}→a^{3}Π_{u} d^{3}Π_{g}→c^{3}Σ^{+}_{u} d^{3}Π_{g}→A^{1}Π_{u}	518.0 nm 1.5 μm 860.0 nm	Green; Short-wavelength infrared Near infrared
C^{1}Π_{g}	409.9	C^{1}Π_{g}→A^{1}Π_{u} C^{1}Π_{g}→a^{3}Π_{u} C^{1}Π_{g}→c^{3}Σ^{+}_{u}	386.6 nm 298.0 nm 477.4 nm	Violet; Mid-ultraviolet; Blue

Molecular orbital theory shows that there are two sets of paired electrons in a degenerate pi bonding set of orbitals. This gives a bond order of 2, meaning that there should exist a double bond between the two carbon atoms in a C_{2} molecule. One analysis suggested instead that a quadruple bond exists, an interpretation that was disputed. CASSCF calculations indicate that the quadruple bond based on molecular orbital theory is also reasonable. Bond dissociation energies (BDE) of B_{2}, C_{2}, and N_{2} show increasing BDE, indicating single, double, and triple bonds, respectively.

In certain forms of crystalline carbon, such as diamond and graphite, a saddle point or "hump" occurs at the bond site in the charge density. The triplet state of C_{2} does follow this trend. However, the singlet state of C_{2} acts more like silicon or germanium; that is, the charge density has a maximum at the bond site.

== Reactions ==
Diatomic carbon will react with acetone and acetaldehyde to produce acetylene by two different pathways.

- Triplet C_{2} molecules will react through an intermolecular pathway, which is shown to exhibit diradical character. The intermediate for this pathway is the ethylene radical. Its abstraction is correlated with bond energies.
- Singlet C_{2} molecules will react through an intramolecular, nonradical pathway in which two hydrogen atoms will be taken away from one molecule. The intermediate for this pathway is singlet vinylidene. The singlet reaction can happen through a 1,1-diabstraction or a 1,2-diabstraction. This reaction is insensitive to isotope substitution. The different abstractions are possibly due to the spatial orientations of the collisions rather than the bond energies.
- Singlet C_{2} will also react with alkenes. Acetylene is a main product; however, it appears C_{2} will insert into carbon-hydrogen bonds.
- C_{2} is 2.5 times more likely to insert into a methyl group as into methylene groups.
- There is a disputed possible room-temperature chemical synthesis via alkynyl-λ^{3}-iodane.

== Comets ==
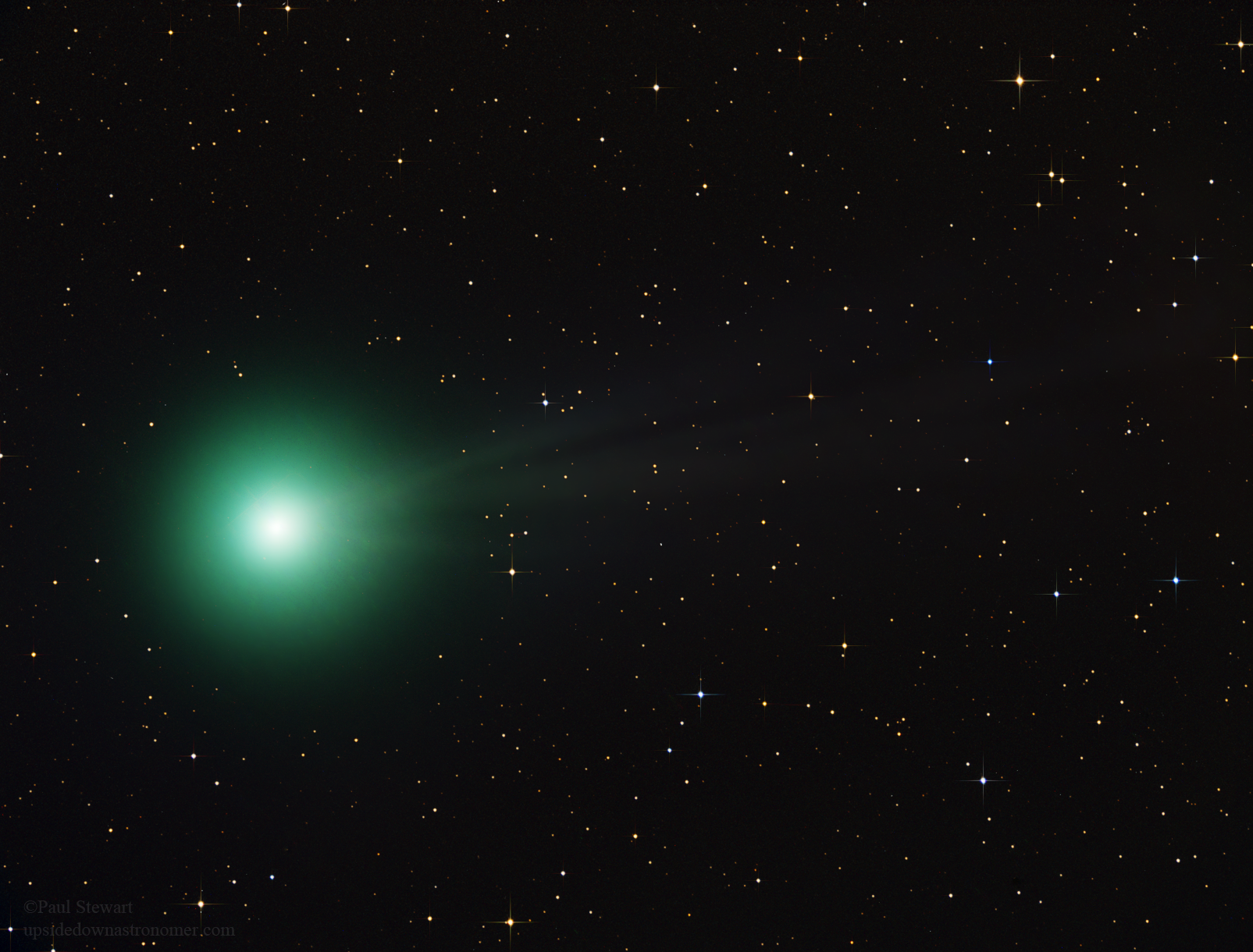
C/2014 Q2 (Lovejoy) glows green due to diatomic carbon.

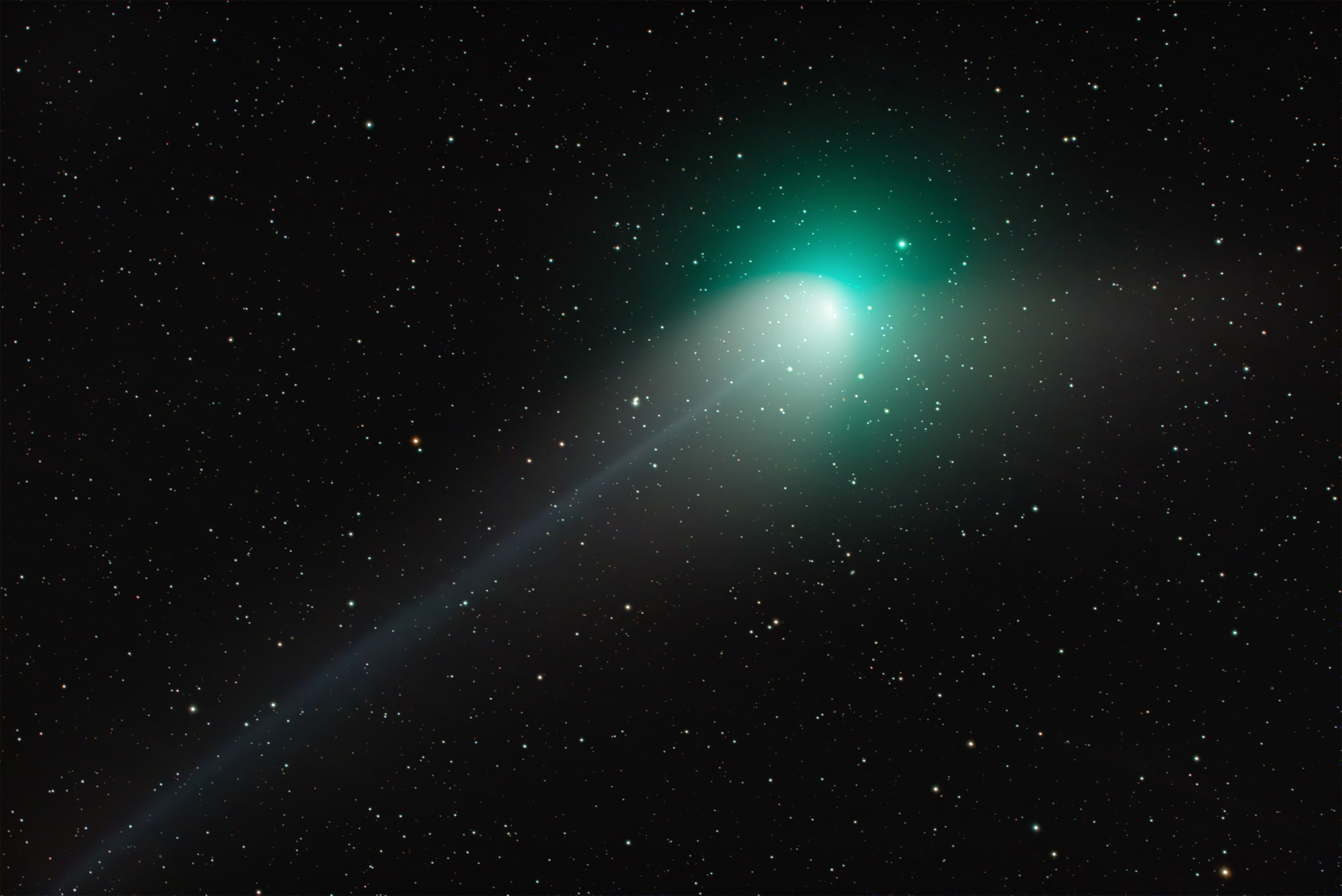
C/2022 E3 (ZTF) also looks green.

The light of gas-rich comets mainly originates from the emission of diatomic carbon. An example is C/2014 Q2 (Lovejoy), where there are several lines of C_{2} light, mostly in the visible spectrum, forming the Swan bands. C/2022 E3 (ZTF), visible in early 2023, also exhibits green color due to the presence of diatomic carbon.

== See also ==
- Acetylide – a related chemical with the formula C^{2−}_{2}
