= Lovejoy, Missouri =

Human settlement in Missouri, United States of America

Coordinates: 37°32′00″N 89°31′41″W

Lovejoy is an extinct town in Cape Girardeau County, in the U.S. state of Missouri. The GNIS classifies it as a populated place.

A post office called Lovejoy was established in 1887, and remained in operation until 1894. The community took its name from nearby Lovejoy Creek.
