= Foothill Observatory =

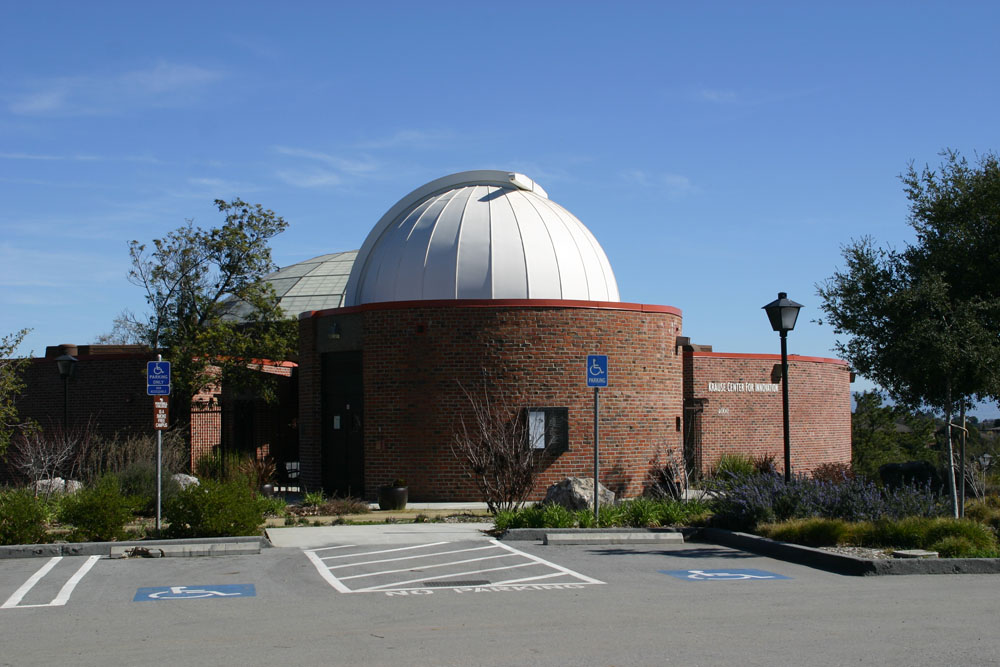
- The observatory at the Space Science Center and Krause Center for Innovation

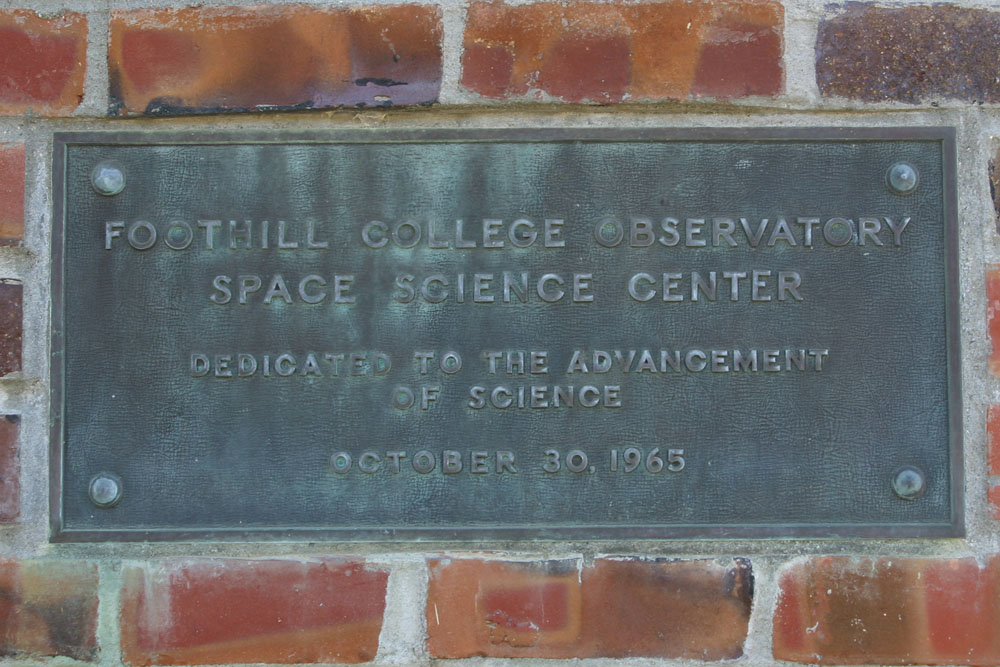
- Organization: Peninsula Astronomical Society
- Location: Los Altos Hills, California, US
- Coordinates: 37°21′47.25″N 122°7′53.45″W
- Established: 1965

Telescopes
- Meade LX200: 16" Schmidt-Cassegrain
- Related media on Commons

Foothill Observatory is an astronomical observatory owned and operated by Peninsula Astronomical Society (PAS) and Foothill College. It is located on the college's campus in Los Altos Hills, California (US). The observatory is used by students enrolled in the introductory astronomy lab on campus, which is part of the college's thriving astronomy for non-scientists program, serving over 800 students per year. A 16-inch (410 mm) Schmidt-Cassegrain telescope was donated to the observatory and went into operation in 2007.

Conditions permitting, the PAS opens the observatory for public viewing every clear Friday night from 9 p.m. to about 11 p.m., and for solar viewing every clear Saturday morning from 10 a.m. to 12 p.m.

== See also ==
- List of observatories
- Andrew Fraknoi, former Chair of the Astronomy Department at Foothill College (retired 2017)
