= Lovejoy Lake =

Lake in the state of Minnesota, United States

- Location within Minnesota
- Location: Wadena County, Minnesota
- Coordinates: 46°24′54″N 94°51′12″W
- Type: lake

Lovejoy Lake is a lake in Wadena County, in the U.S. state of Minnesota.

Lovejoy Lake bears the name of Charles O. Lovejoy, a pioneer who settled there.

== See also ==
- List of lakes in Minnesota
