= Lovejoy, California =

Lovejoy
- Former settlement
- Location in California
- Coordinates: 39°56′43″N 120°39′30″W
- Country: United States
- State: California
- County: Plumas
- Elevation: 5,810 ft (1,770 m)

Lovejoy (also, Lovejoys) is a former settlement in Plumas County, California, United States. It lay at an elevation of 5807 feet (1770 m). Lovejoy is located 4 miles (6.4 km) south-southwest of Mount Ingalls. It still appeared on maps as of 1897.
