= C/2011 W3 (Lovejoy) =

Great Comet of 2011

C/2011 W3 (Lovejoy) (Great Comet of 2011)
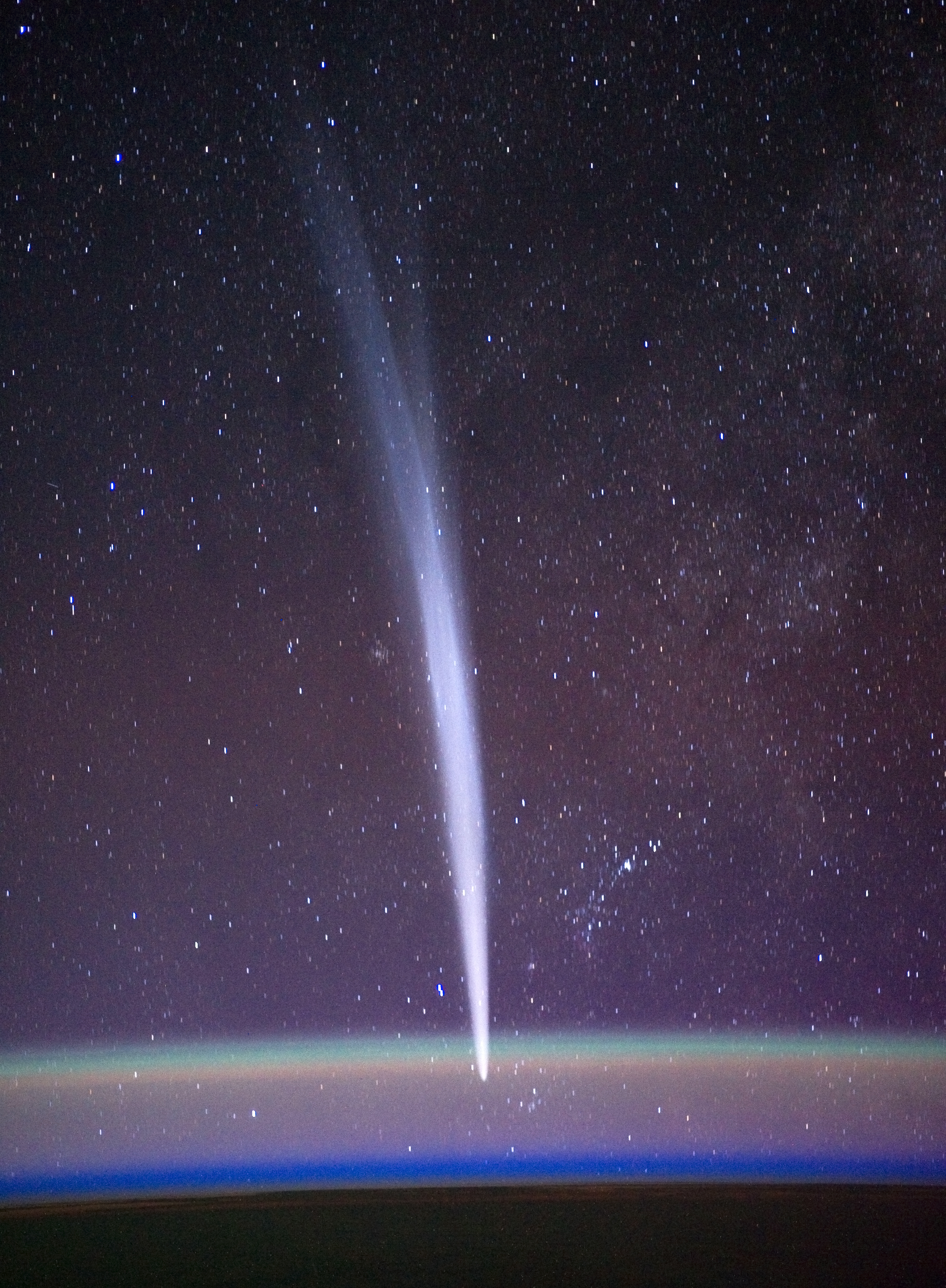
- Comet Lovejoy photographed by Dan Burbank aboard the ISS, 21 December 2011

Discovery
- Discovered by: Terry Lovejoy
- Discovery site: Queensland, Australia
- Discovery date: 27 November 2011

Orbital characteristics
- Epoch: 6 December 2011 (JD 2455901.5)
- Observation arc: 40 days
- Orbit type: Kreutz sungrazer
- Aphelion: 157.4±0.5 AU
- Perihelion: 0.00555 AU (1.19 R_{☉})
- Semi-major axis: 78.7±0.2 AU
- Eccentricity: 0.99993
- Orbital period: ~622 years (outbound)
- Max. orbital speed: 565 km/s
- Inclination: 134.36°
- Longitude of ascending node: 326.37°
- Argument of periapsis: 53.51°
- Mean anomaly: 359.99°
- Last perihelion: 16 December 2011
- Next perihelion: ~2633?
- T_{Jupiter}: 0.002
- Earth MOID: 0.490 AU

Physical characteristics
- Dimensions: 0.2–7.7 km (0.12–4.78 mi)
- Comet total magnitude (M1): 15.3
- Comet nuclear magnitude (M2): 20.6
- Apparent magnitude: –4.0 (2011 apparition)

Comet Lovejoy, formally designated C/2011 W3 (Lovejoy), was a long-period comet and Kreutz sungrazer. It was discovered in November 2011 by Australian amateur astronomer Terry Lovejoy. The comet's perihelion took it through the Sun's corona on 16 December 2011, after which it either emerged intact, though greatly impacted by the event, or disintegrated.

As Comet Lovejoy was announced on the 16th anniversary of the SOHO satellite's launch it became known as "The Great Birthday Comet of 2011", and because it was visible from Earth during the Christmas holiday it was also nicknamed "The Great Christmas Comet of 2011". Lovejoy was retroactively dubbed the Great Comet of 2011.

== Discovery ==
Comet Lovejoy was discovered on 27 November 2011 by Terry Lovejoy of Thornlands, Queensland, during a comet survey using a 20 cm (7 7/8 in) Schmidt–Cassegrain telescope and a QHY9 CCD camera. It is the third comet discovered by Terry Lovejoy. He reported that it was "a rapidly moving fuzzy object" of 13th magnitude, and additional observations were made by him over the next couple of nights.

Independent confirmation of the comet did not come until 1 December, when it was observed by Alan Gilmore and Pamela Kilmartin at the Mount John University Observatory in New Zealand, using its 100 cm (39 in) McLellan Telescope. Upon confirmation, an official report was made to the Central Bureau for Astronomical Telegrams, and the comet's existence was announced by the Minor Planet Center on 2 December. It is the first Kreutz-group comet discovered by ground-based observation in 40 years.

== Observations ==
The first orbital elements using an assumed parabolic trajectory were published by Gareth Williams of the Minor Planet Center on 2 December, with an estimated perihelion of 0.0059 AU occurring near midnight UTC of 15/16 December. Further refinements were published during subsequent days, including one on 5 December, estimating perihelion at 0.0056 AU just before midnight on 15 December. On 11 December the first elliptical orbit was published, estimating perihelion at 0.0055 AU just after midnight on 16 December.

In space, the comet first became visible to the STEREO-A spacecraft on 3 December, and to the SOHO spacecraft on 14 December. As the comet approached the Sun it was observed by eighteen instruments on six satellites: STEREO-A and -B, SOHO, SDO, Hinode and PROBA2.

A small companion comet, called SOHO-2203, was detected in SOHO images on 14 December by Zhijian Xu, and later spotted by the twin STEREO spacecraft. It is believed to be a fragment of Comet Lovejoy that broke away several decades ago. This discovery was not unexpected, as Kreutz-group comets are often found with smaller companions.

At its brightest, Comet Lovejoy had an apparent magnitude of between –3 and –4, which is about as bright as the planet Venus. It is the brightest sungrazing comet ever observed by SOHO, and the brightest comet to appear since Comet McNaught of 2007, which shone at visual magnitude –5.5. Nevertheless, Lovejoy was largely invisible to the naked eye during its peak brightness due to its proximity to the Sun.

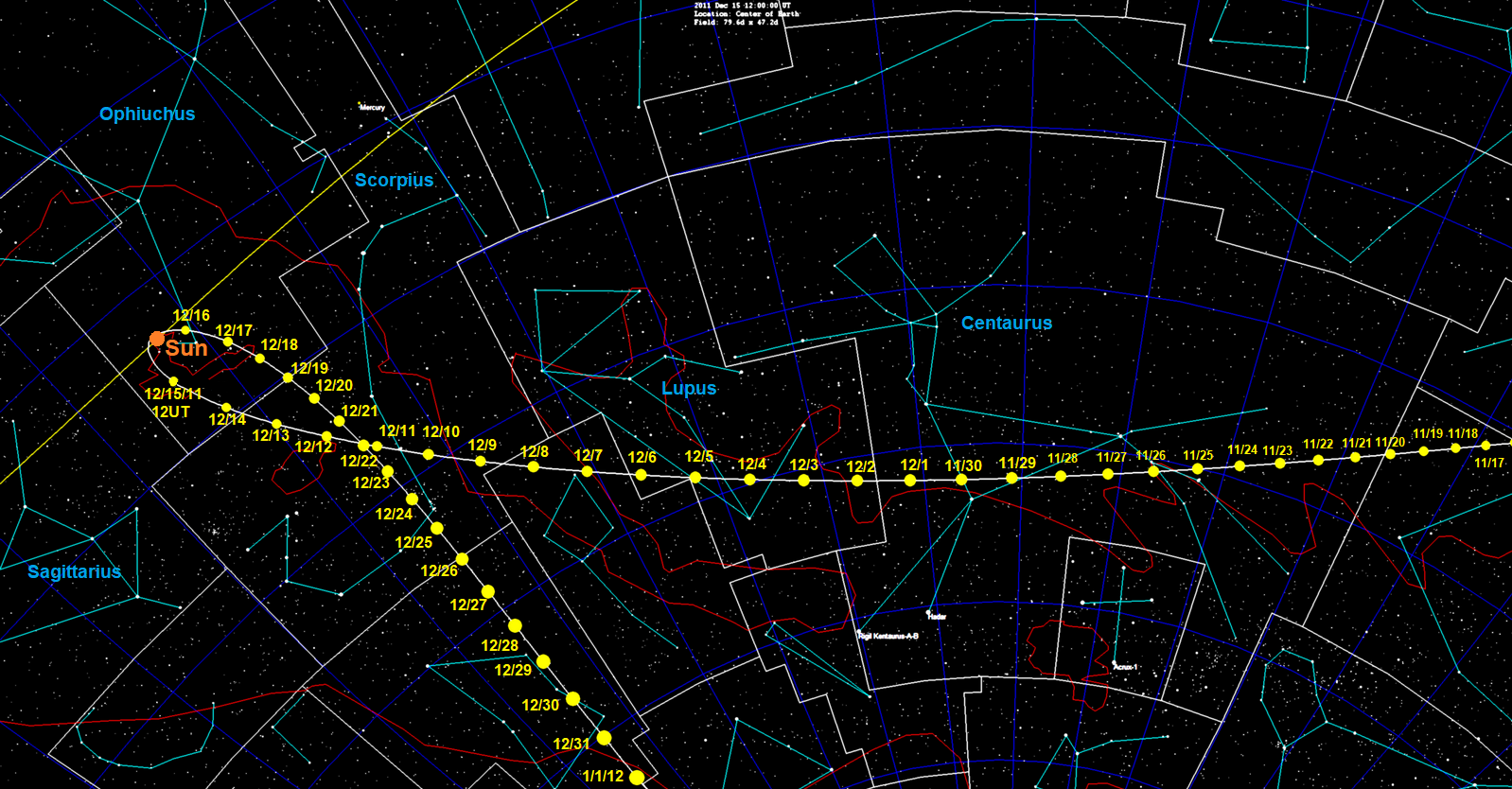
Sky trajectory and daily motion

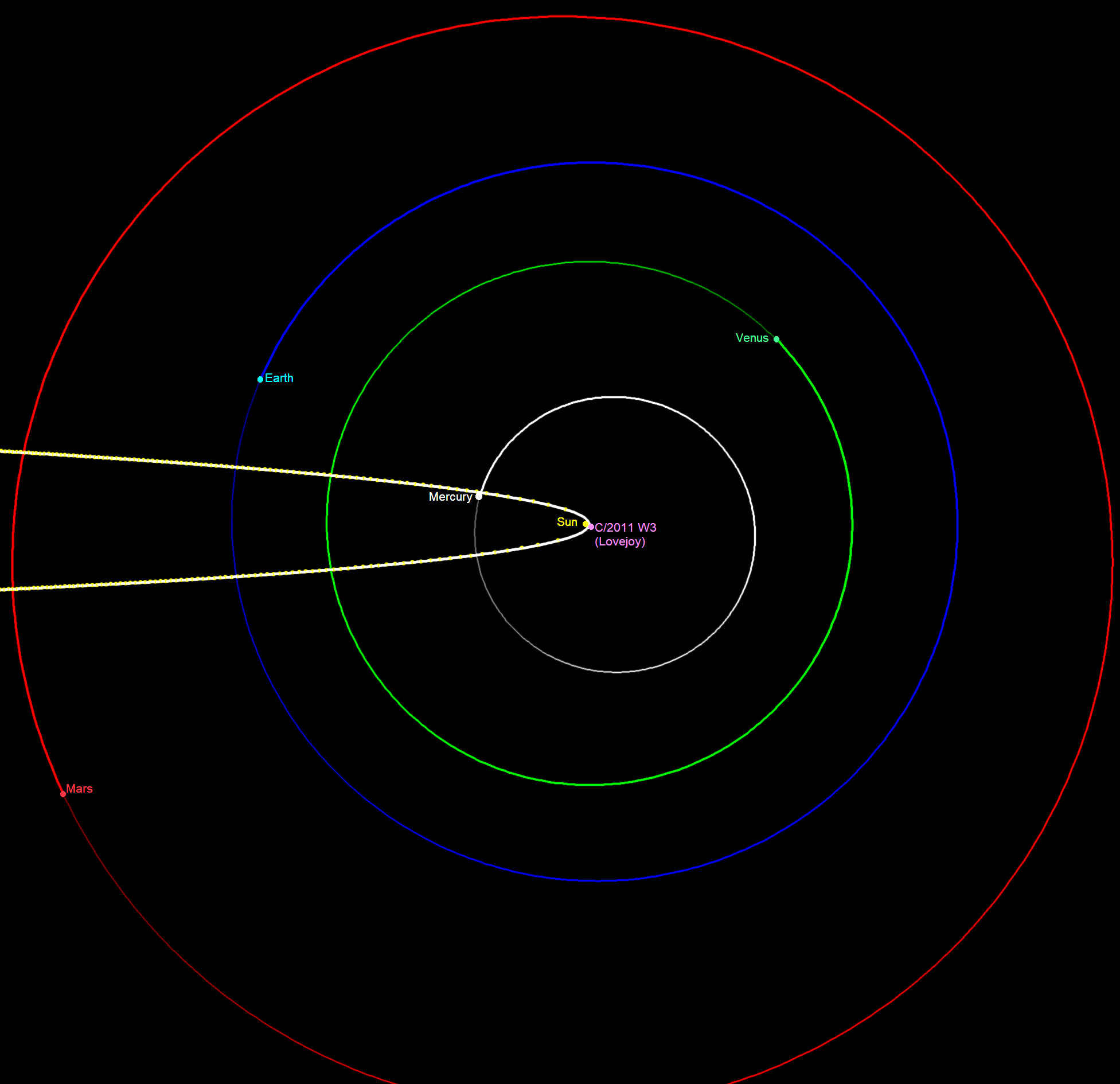
Orbit viewed above ecliptic plane

== Perihelion ==
Comet Lovejoy reached perihelion on 16 December 2011 at 00:17 UTC, as it passed approximately 140,000 kilometres (87,000 mi) above the Sun's surface at a speed of 536 km/s (333 mi/s; 1.93 million km/h; 1.20 million mph), or 0.18% the speed of light. It was not expected to survive the encounter due to extreme conditions in the corona, such as temperatures reaching more than one million kelvins and the exposure time of nearly an hour. However, the Solar Dynamics Observatory (SDO), as well as other Sun-monitoring spacecraft, observed the comet emerge from the corona intact. The STEREO and SOHO spacecraft continued to observe the comet as it moved away from the Sun.

Before perihelion, the nucleus of Comet Lovejoy had been estimated to be between 100 and 200 metres (330 and 660 ft) in diameter. Since the comet survived perihelion, it is thought that the nucleus must have been larger, perhaps up to 500 metres (1,600 ft). During the coronal passage, it is believed that a significant fraction of the comet's mass evaporated.

== Outbound flight ==
The first ground-based observation of Comet Lovejoy post-perihelion occurred on 16 December at 19:55 UTC, when it was seen by Rick Baldridge and Brian Day of the Foothill Observatory. Baldridge estimated the comet at magnitude −1. The comet's discoverer, Terry Lovejoy, made a pair of observations on 17 December at 01:12 and 20:24 UTC, with apparent magnitudes estimated at −1.2 and −0.8, respectively.

Images taken on 20 December around 08:00 UTC suggested that the comet had undergone significant changes. Taken by Czech astronomer Jakub Černý using the robotic FRAM telescope at Pierre Auger Observatory, the images indicated that "the nucleus had apparently become bar-shaped and was accompanied by a bright tail ray."

Comet Lovejoy re-emerged as a naked eye object in the Southern Hemisphere around 21–22 December, when astronaut Dan Burbank photographed it from the International Space Station. Ground-based photographers continued to capture images of the comet, which had dimmed to around 4th magnitude. While Lovejoy would have continued to be visible to Southern Hemisphere observers into early 2012, large telescopes would have been required to see the comet by the time it crossed into the Northern Hemisphere in February.

Some concern was expressed after perihelion that the stresses induced in the comet by its close approach to the Sun might result in its disintegration. That observers were unable to locate a distinct nucleus amidst the more visible tail furthered this idea; using observations from the Pierre Auger Observatory, Zdeněk Sekanina and Paul Chodas determined that, while the nucleus did survive perihelion for several days, following a significant outburst of dust on 19 December, the nucleus underwent a "cataclysmic fragmentation" event on 20 December and completely disappeared.

Lovejoy (C/2011 W3) closest Earth approach on 7 January 2012
Date and time of closest approach	Earth distance (AU)	Sun distance (AU)	Velocity relative to Earth (km/s)	Velocity relative to Sun (km/s)	Uncertainty region (3-sigma)	Solar elongation
7 January 2012 ≈18:56	0.499 AU (74.6 million km; 46.4 million mi; 194 LD)	0.877 AU (131.2 million km; 81.5 million mi; 341 LD)	53.8	44.8	± 6300 km	63°

In the event that some portion of the nucleus did survive, the eccentricity and inclination of Comet Lovejoy's orbit avoids significant perturbation from planets, which leaves the possibility that the comet may return for another perihelion. Using an epoch 2050 solution, Comet Lovejoy is estimated to have about a 622-year orbit and a return to perihelion around the year 2633.

== Possible fragmentation history ==
An elliptical orbit calculated by Sekanina and Chodas in 2012 indicates that Comet Lovejoy is a fragment of an unrecorded sungrazer that reached perihelion around 1329. The fragmentation history suggested by these authors is that a parent sungrazer, likely the comet observed in 467 CE, split near the Sun due to tidal forces during its pass. The principal fragment – or a non-tidally fragmented portion of it – returned as the Great Comet of 1106, but a secondary fragment was imparted a longer orbital period and returned about 1329. This secondary also split at perihelion and its principal fragment will return around 2200, likely as a cluster of further fragments. A secondary fragment of this event left on a shorter period that theoretically should have brought it back to the inner solar system during the early years of the 21st century. At some point after perihelion, this secondary fragment broke apart due to non-tidal forces and one of the resulting fragments became Comet Lovejoy. Other similar fragments may also exist and might return as sungrazers in the near future.

== Gallery ==
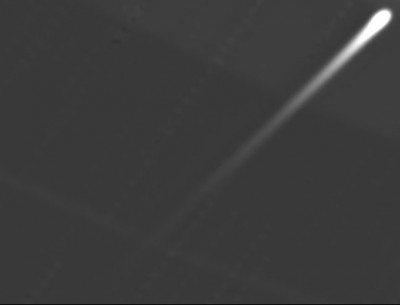
STEREO-A close-up of Comet Lovejoy before perihelion
14 December 2011

STEREO-A sequence of Comet Lovejoy approaching the Sun
14 December 2011

SDO witnesses Comet Lovejoy survive the Sun's corona
16 December 2011

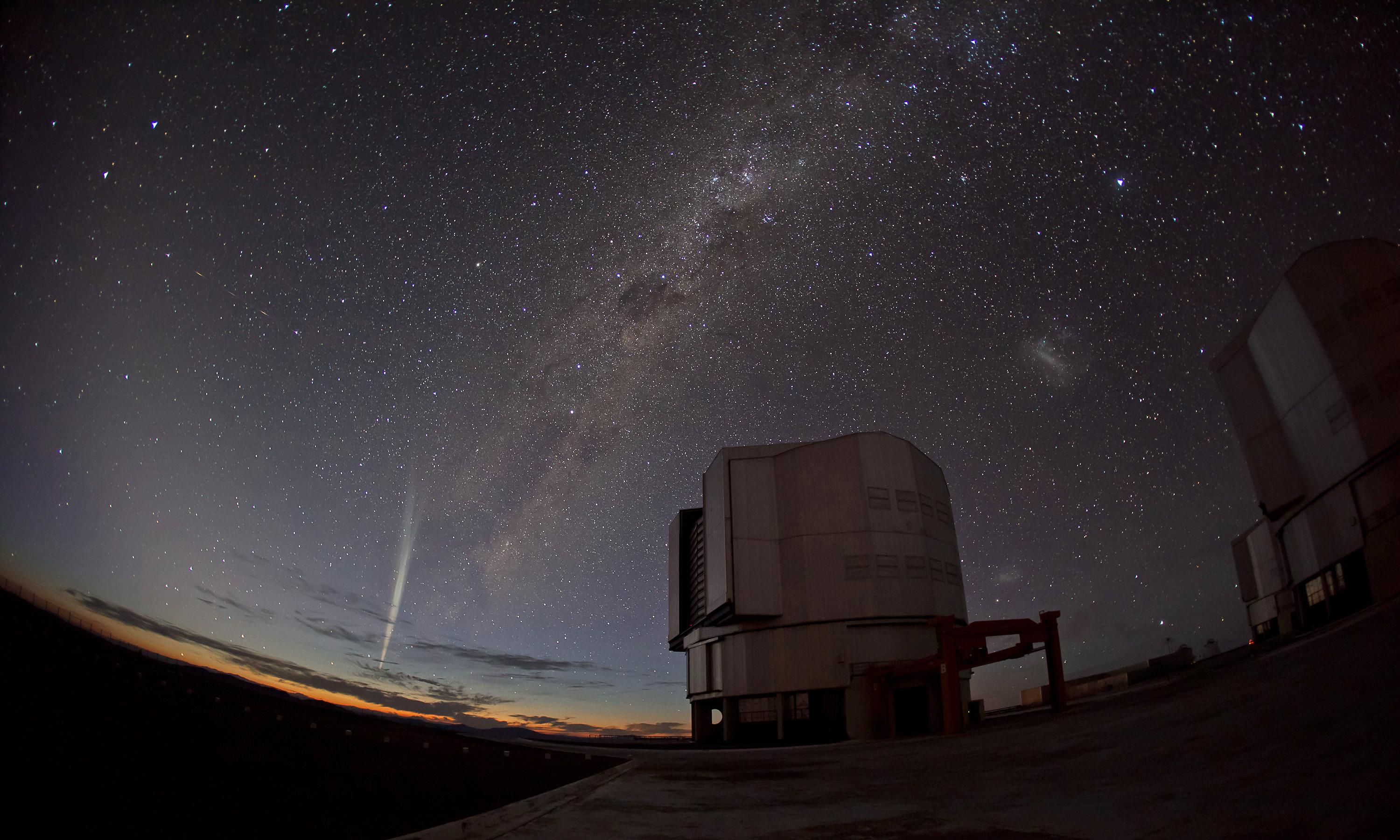
Christmas Comet Lovejoy Captured at Paranal Observatory
22 December 2011

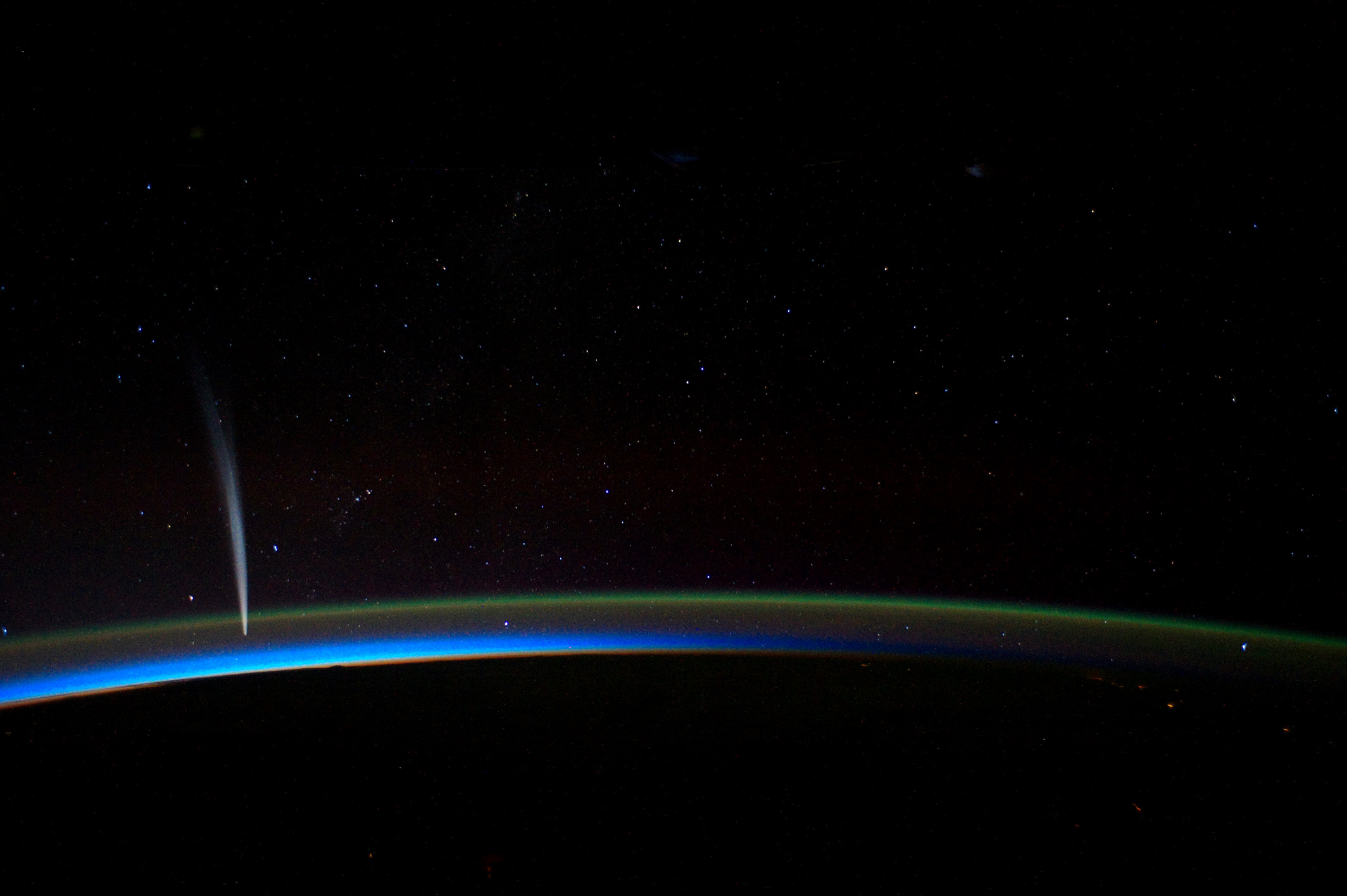
View of the comet from the ISS in Earth orbit
22 December 2011

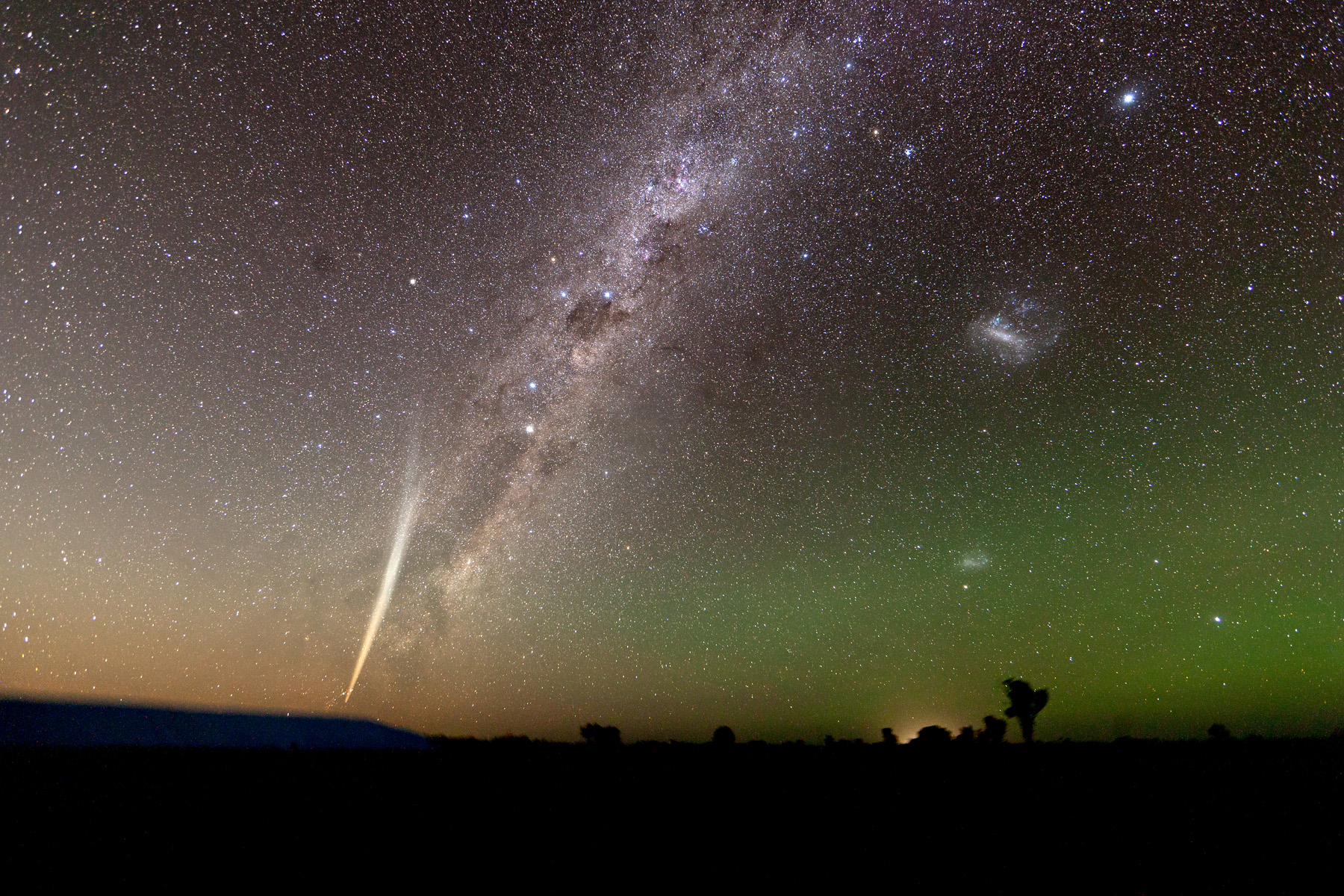
Wide field photo at sunrise with Zodiacal light and airglow
25 December 2011
