= C/2007 E2 (Lovejoy) =

Non-periodic comet

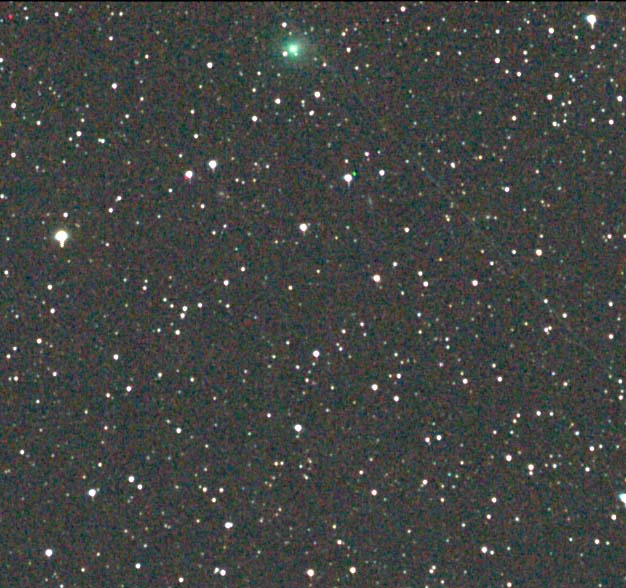
- Comet C/2007 E2 (Lovejoy) discovery frame

Discovery
- Discovered by: Terry Lovejoy
- Discovery date: 15 March 2007

Orbital characteristics
- Epoch: 2454230.5 (10 May 2007)
- Aphelion: 1838 AU (inbound); 1554 AU (outbound)
- Perihelion: 1.09294 AU
- Eccentricity: 0.999233
- Orbital period: ~28000 yr (inbound); ~22000 yr (outbound)
- Inclination: 95.8835°
- Last perihelion: 27 March 2007

Physical characteristics
- Mean radius: 0.624 km (0.388 mi) (Note: Calculated mean radius using the formula: $\log_{10}\,(\,R\,)\ =\;0.9 +\;0.13 (\,H\,)$ Where $\,H\,$ is the comet's absolute total magnitude (M1))
- Comet total magnitude (M1): 8.5

C/2007 E2 (Lovejoy) is a non-periodic comet discovered by Terry Lovejoy on 15 March 2007. Its perihelion was 27 March 2007, while its closest approach to Earth was 25 April 2007 in Hercules at a distance of 0.44 AU. Maximum apparent magnitude was approximately +8.

The discovery was made using a Canon EOS 350D consumer grade digital camera, and not a CCD survey camera.

== Image gallery ==
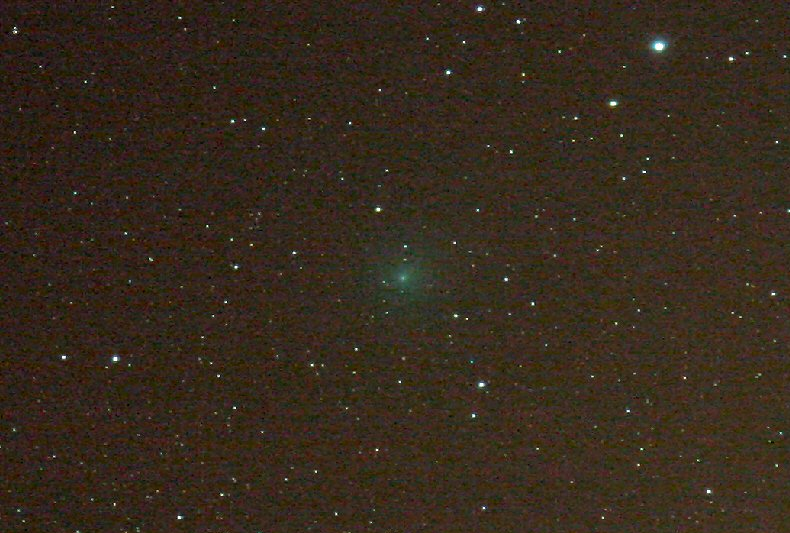
C/2007 E2 on 21 April 2007 from Mount Laguna, California

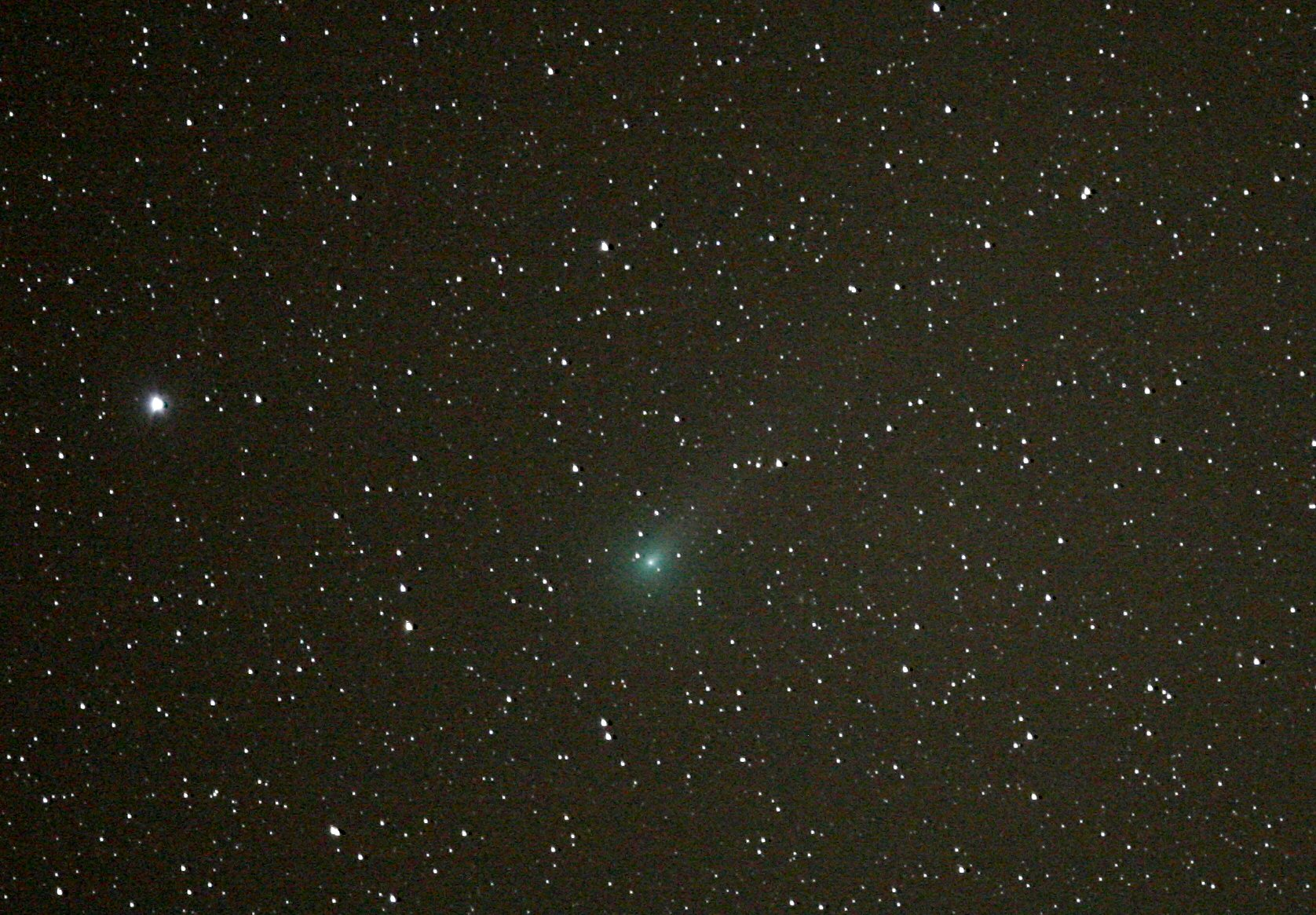
Sporting a vague tail to the 2 o'clock on 9 May 2007 from Mount Laguna. The star is Mu Draconis (mag 4.90)
