= C/2014 Q2 (Lovejoy) =

Non-periodic comet

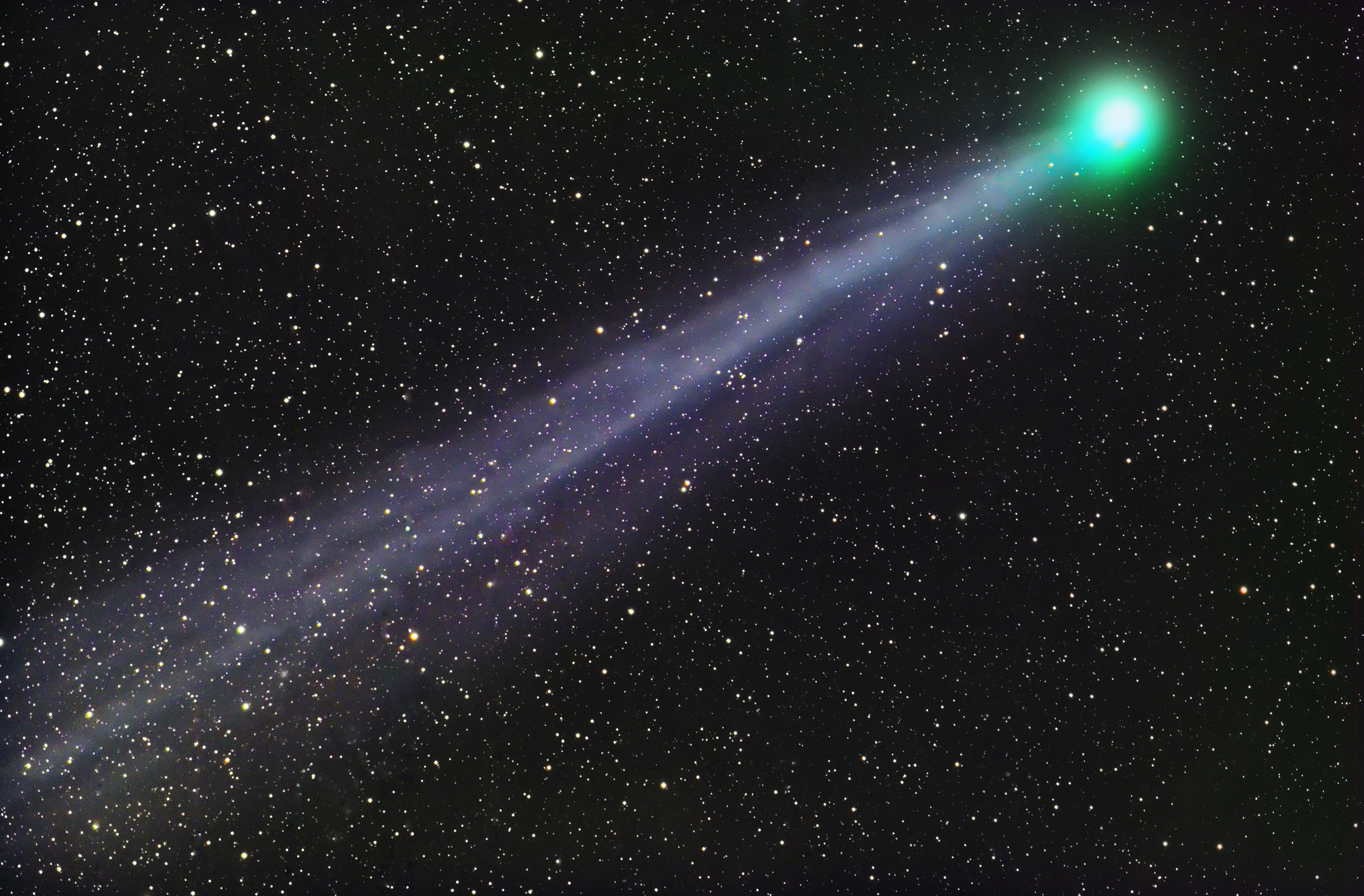
- Comet Lovejoy on 19 January 2015

Discovery
- Discovered by: Terry Lovejoy; 0.2-m Schmidt
- Discovery site: Birkdale Observatory (Q80)
- Discovery date: 17 August 2014

Designations
- Alternative designations: CK14Q020

Orbital characteristics
- Epoch: 30 March 2015 (JD 2457111.5)
- Observation arc: 2.2 years (802 days)
- Earliest precovery date: 1 July 2014
- Number of observations: 7,890
- Aphelion: ~1,160 AU
- Perihelion: 1.291 AU
- Semi-major axis: ~580 AU
- Eccentricity: 0.99811
- Orbital period: ~11,000 years (inbound); ~8,000 years (outbound)
- Inclination: 80.301°
- Longitude of ascending node: 94.975°
- Argument of periapsis: 12.395°
- Mean anomaly: 0.004°
- Last perihelion: 30 January 2015
- T_{Jupiter}: 0.246
- Earth MOID: 0.320 AU
- Jupiter MOID: 3.811 AU

Physical characteristics
- Mean radius: 6.0 km (3.7 mi)
- Mean density: 450±60 kg/m^{3}
- Synodic rotation period: 17.89±0.17 hours
- Comet total magnitude (M1): 9.1
- Apparent magnitude: 4.0 (2015 apparition)

C/2014 Q2 (Lovejoy) is a non-periodic comet discovered on 17 August 2014 by Terry Lovejoy using a 0.2-meter (8 in) Schmidt–Cassegrain telescope. It was discovered as a 15th-magnitude object in the southern constellation of Puppis. It is the fifth comet discovered by Terry Lovejoy.

== Observational history ==
By December 2014, the comet had brightened to roughly magnitude 7.4, making it a small telescope and binoculars target. By mid-December, the comet was visible to the naked eye for experienced observers with dark skies and keen eyesight. On 28–29 December 2014, the comet passed 1/3° from globular cluster Messier 79. In January 2015, it brightened to roughly magnitude 4, and became one of the brightest comets located high in a dark sky since comet C/1995 O1 (Hale–Bopp) in 1997. On 7 January 2015, the comet passed 0.469 AU (70.2 million km; 43.6 million mi) from Earth. It crossed the celestial equator on 9 January 2015, becoming better seen from the Northern Hemisphere. The comet came to perihelion (closest approach to the Sun) on 30 January 2015, at a distance of 1.29 AU (193 million km; 120 million mi) from the Sun. At perihelion, its water production rate exceeded 20 metric tons per second.

== Orbit ==
C/2014 Q2 originated from the Oort cloud, but is not a dynamically new comet. Before entering the planetary region (epoch 1950), C/2014 Q2 had an orbital period of about 11000 years, with an aphelion about 995 AU (148.8 billion km; 92.5 billion mi) from the Sun. After leaving the planetary region (epoch 2050), it will have an orbital period of about 8,000 years, with aphelion of about 800 AU.

== Physical characteristics ==
=== Nucleus size and rotation ===
The nucleus of Comet Lovejoy was estimated to be 6.0 km (3.7 mi) in radius, with a rotation period that is completed once every 17.89±0.17 hours.

=== Chemical composition ===
The comet was observed to release 21 different organic molecules in gas, including ethanol and glycolaldehyde, a simple sugar. The presence of organic molecules suggests that they are preserved materials synthesized in the outskirts of the solar nebula or at earlier stages of the Solar System formation. The observed gas production rate from the comet was relatively high, estimated to be approximately 5×10^{29} molecules/sec, which caused the density of ionized water vapor to be effectively constant throughout its inner coma.

Its blue-green glow is the result of organic molecules (mostly diatomic carbon) and water released by the comet fluorescing under the intense UV and optical light of the Sun as it passes through space.

== Gallery ==
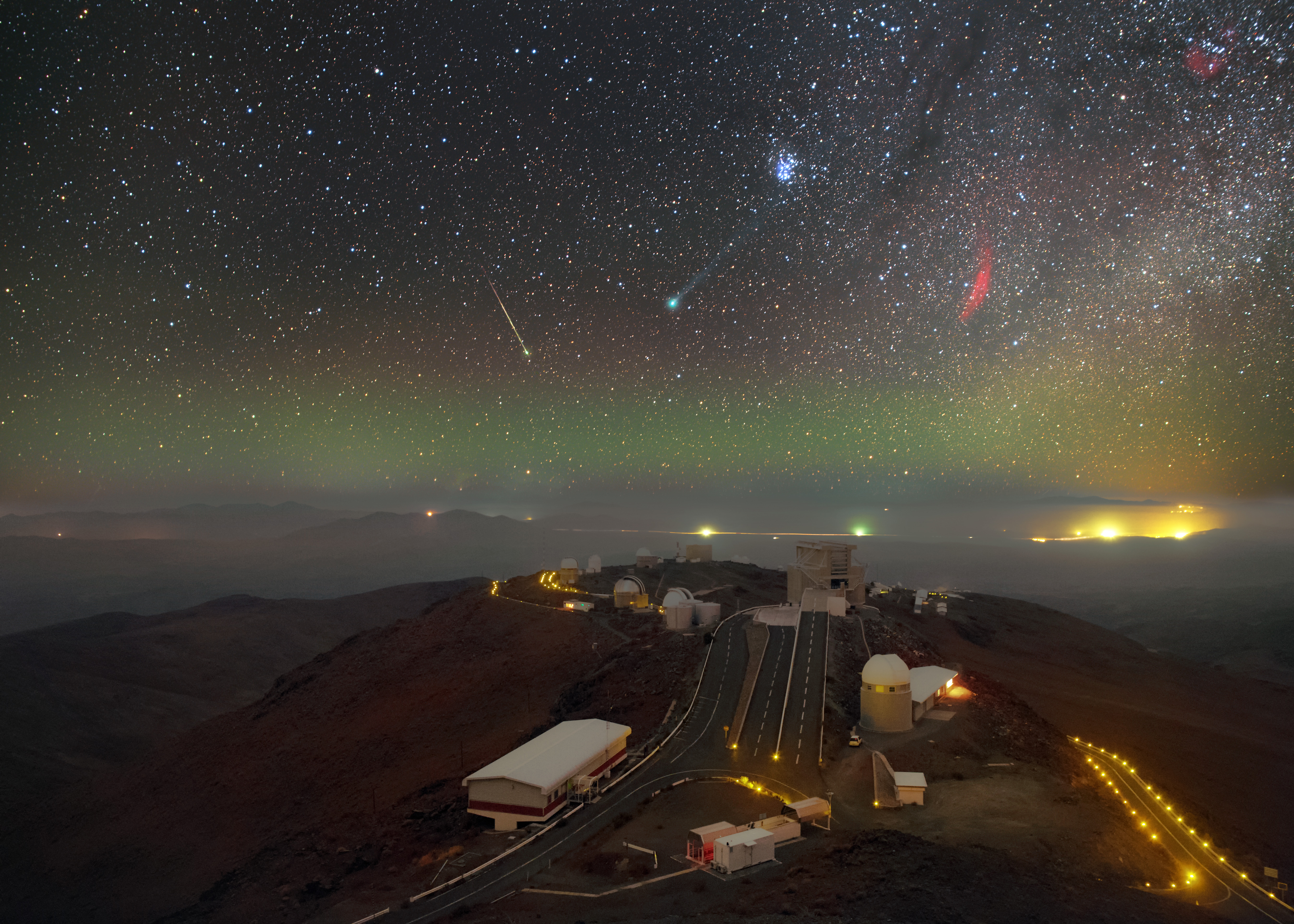
C/2014 Q2 glowing green over La Silla Observatory

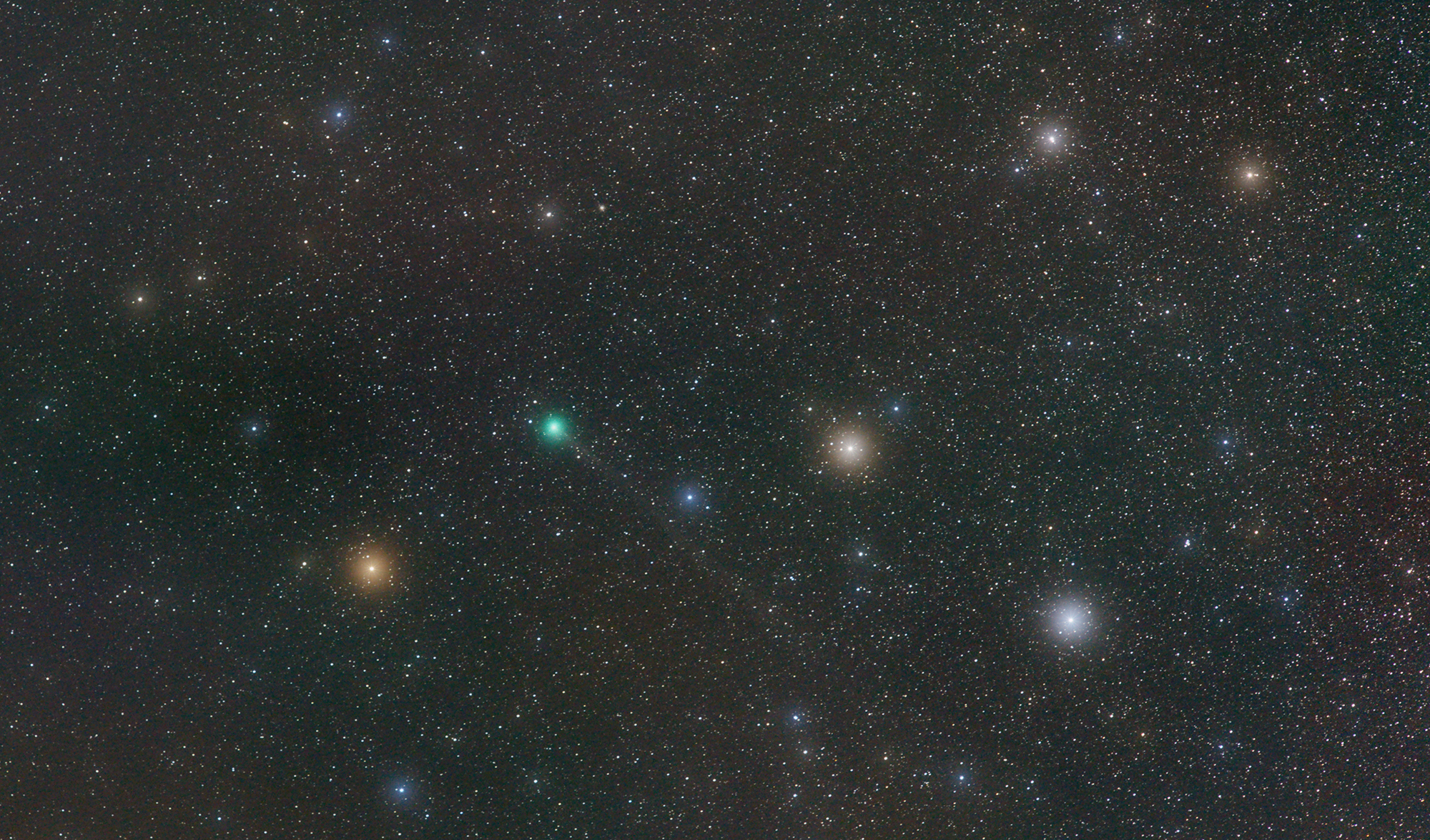
C/2014 Q2 seen passing through Lepus, 29 December 2014

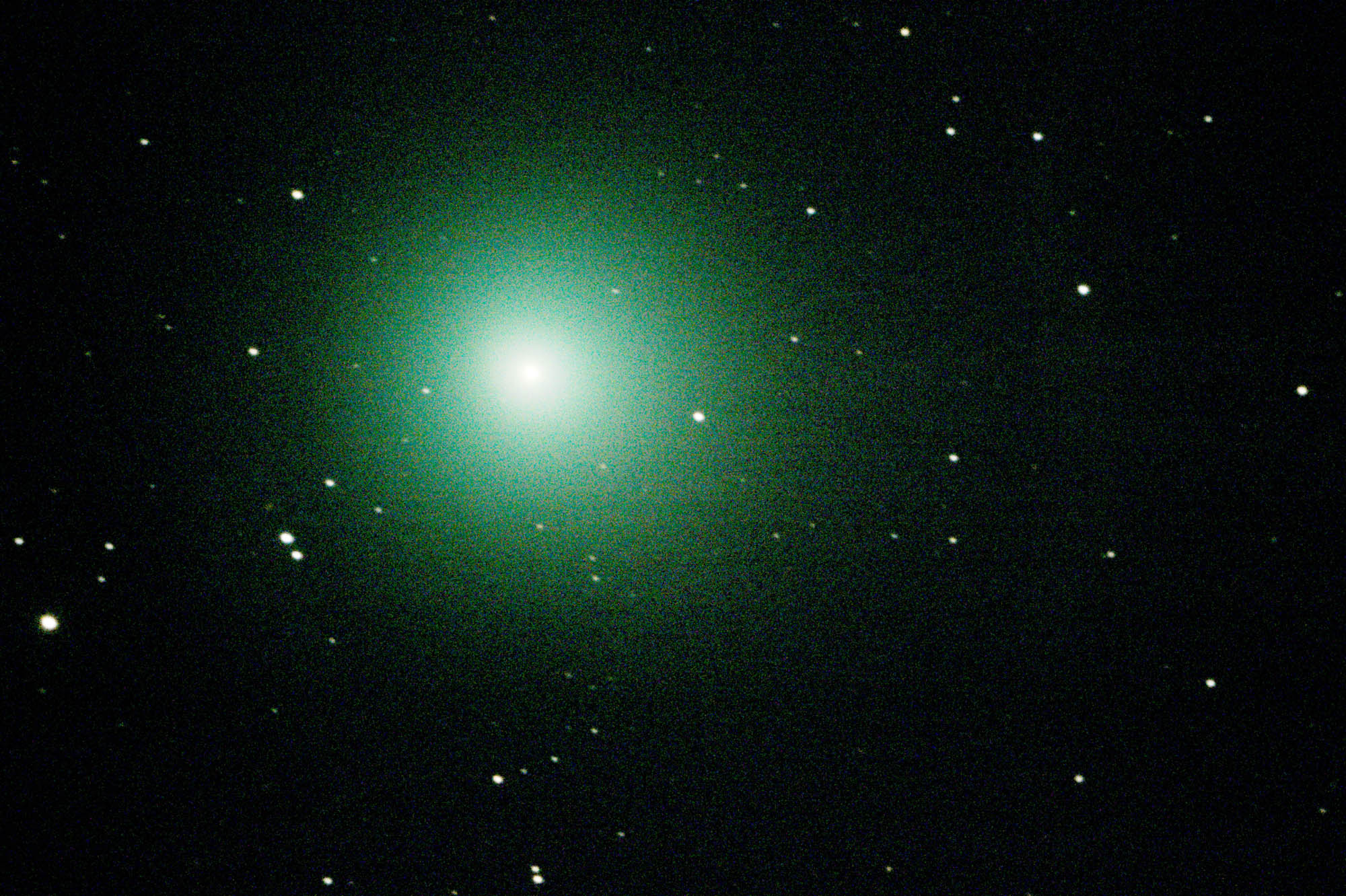
C/2014 Q2, 17 January 2015, with an 8" Schmidt–Cassegrain telescope

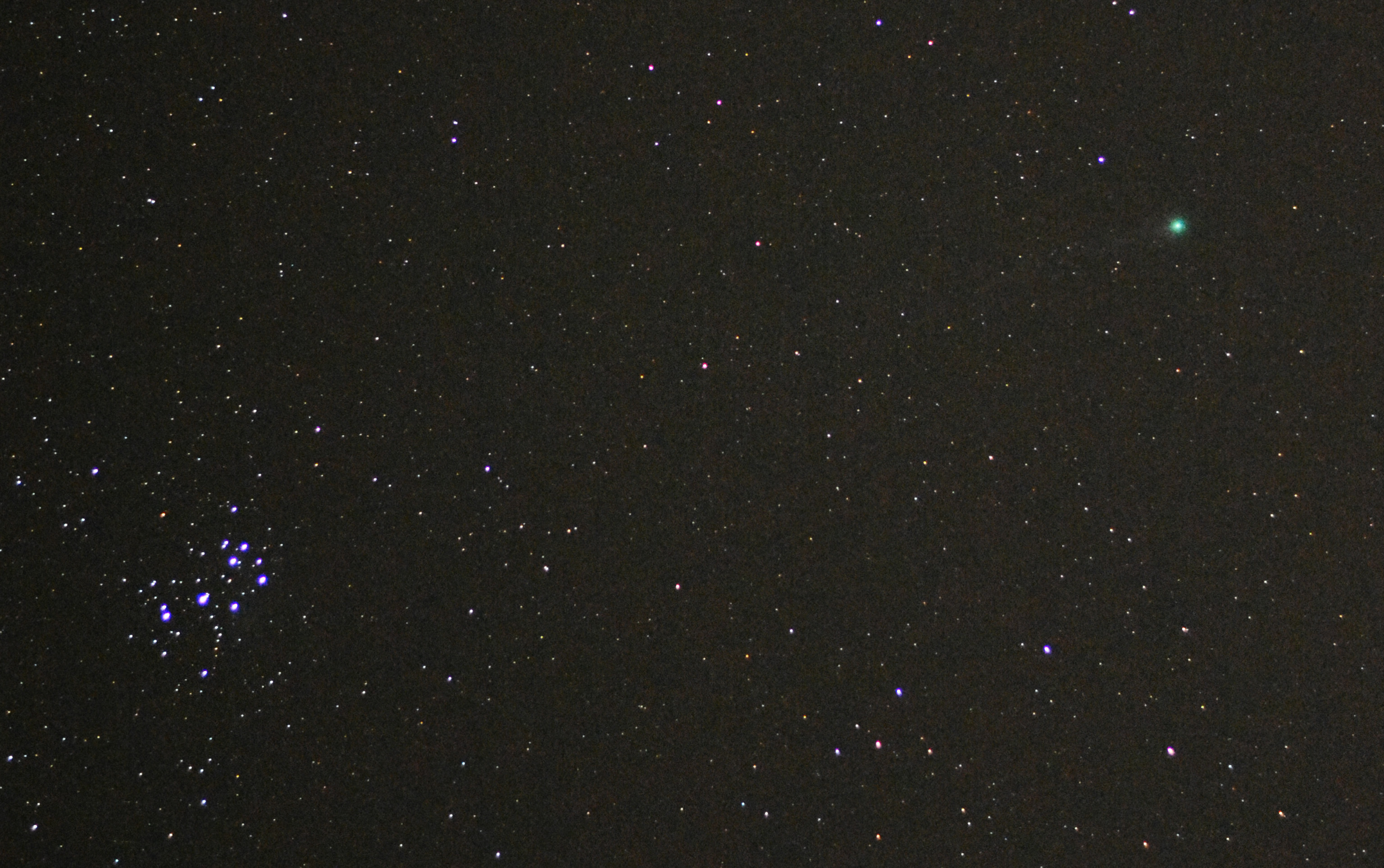
C/2014 Q2 and the Pleiades star cluster, 19 January 2015, with a DSLR

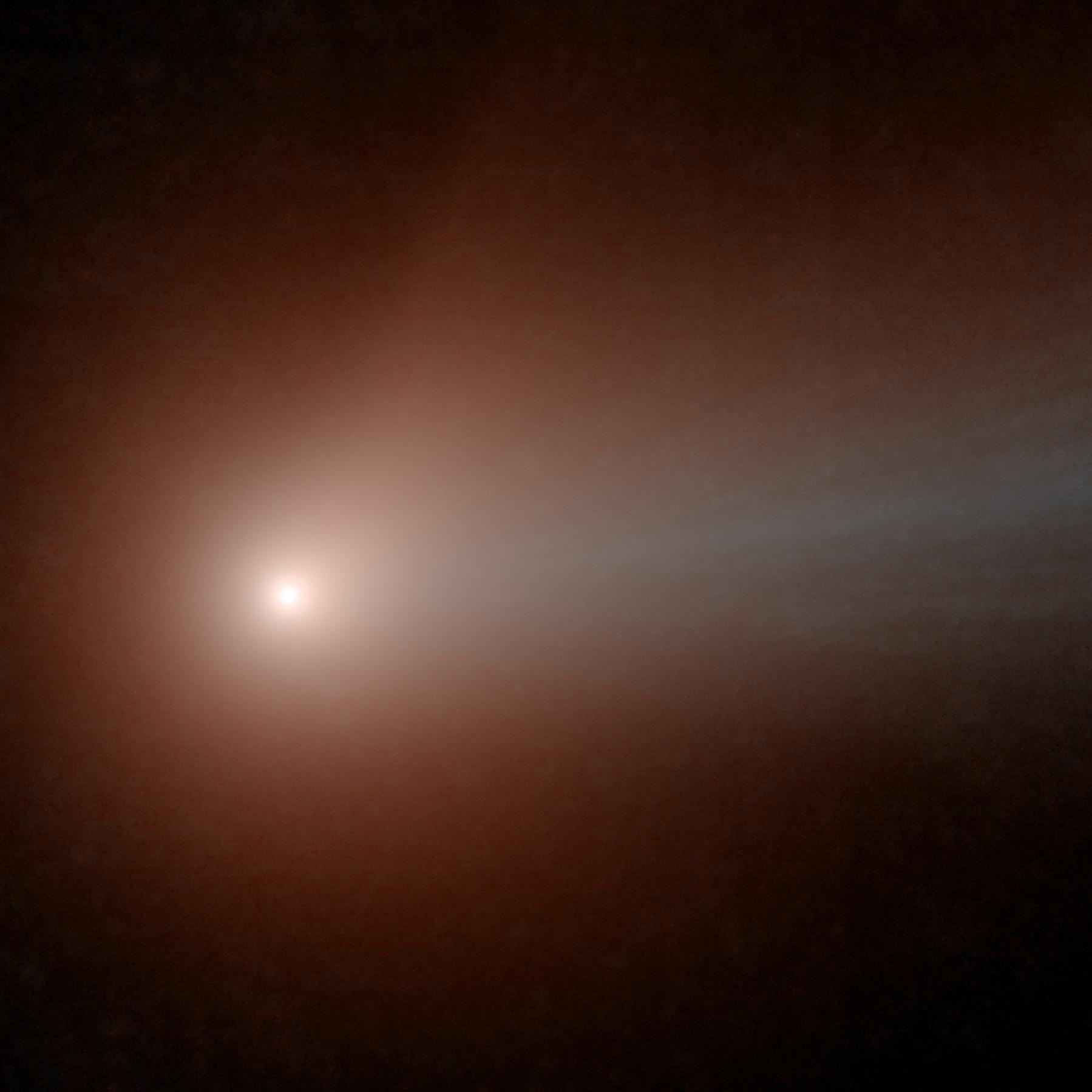
C/2014 Q2, 30 January 2015, NEOWISE
