= Terry Lovejoy =

Australian information technologist

- Born: 20 November 1966 (age 59); Thornlands, Queensland, Australia
- Occupation: Information technologist
- Known for: Digital camera astrophotography
- Notable work: C/2007 E2 (Lovejoy), C/2007 K5 (Lovejoy), C/2011 W3 (Lovejoy), C/2013 R1 (Lovejoy), C/2014 Q2 (Lovejoy), C/2017 E4 (Lovejoy)

Discoveries

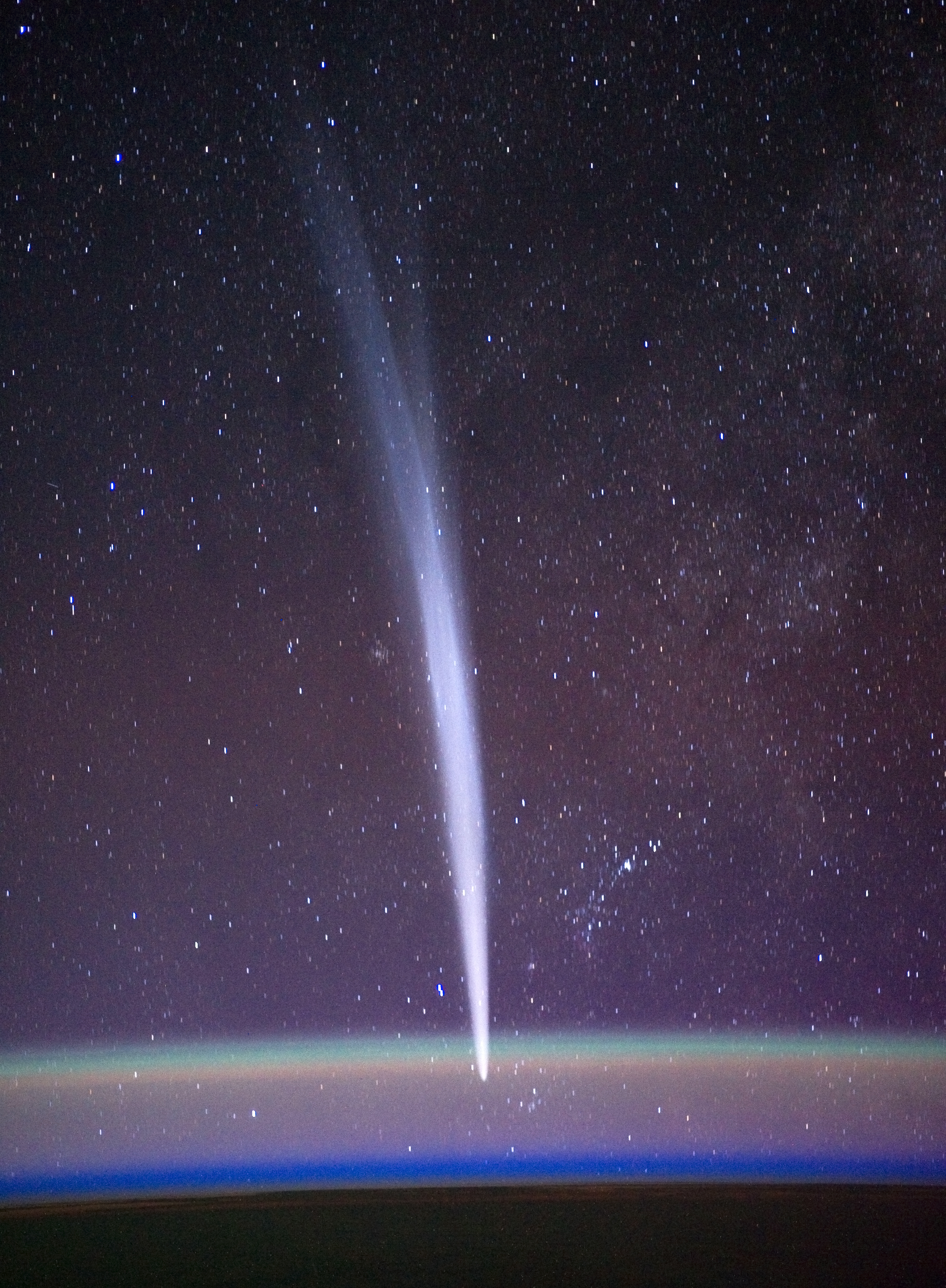
C/2011 W3 (Lovejoy)

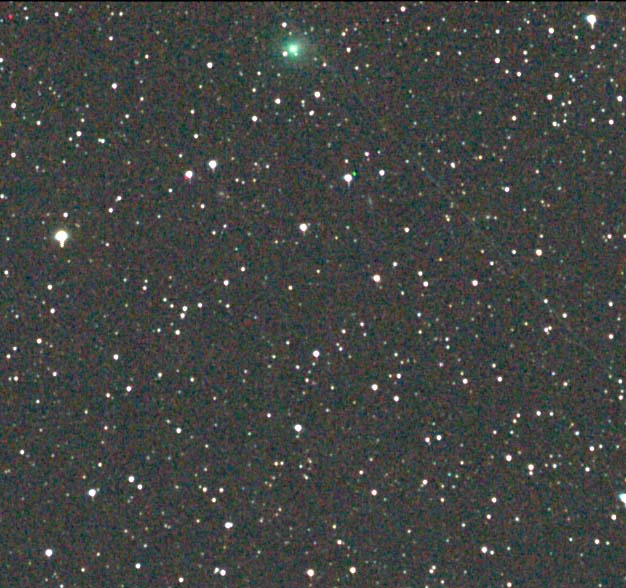
C/2007 E2 (Lovejoy) discovery frame

Terry Lovejoy (born 20 November 1966) is an information technologist from Thornlands, Queensland, Australia, most widely known as an amateur astronomer. He has discovered six comets, including C/2011 W3 (Lovejoy), the first Kreutz Sungrazing comet discovered by ground-based observation in over 40 years. He is also known for popularizing procedures for modifying consumer-grade digital cameras so that they can be used for digital camera astrophotography.

== Astrophotography ==
Lovejoy is known among amateur astronomers for identifying modifications to digital cameras needed for astrophotography. Such cameras come configured with built-in filters that cut off infrared light. They also cut off some of the red light that many deep space objects emit. After he published procedures to modify those filters, many amateur astronomers were able to improve their deep space photography.

Gordon J. Garradd named 61342 Lovejoy in honor of Lovejoy after discovering it on 3 August 2000.

On 15 March 2007, Lovejoy used a standard camera to discover the comet C/2007 E2 (Lovejoy). Two months later, he discovered another comet, designated C/2007 K5 (Lovejoy) using the modified camera.

On 27 November 2011, with his discovery of C/2011 W3 (Lovejoy), he became the first astronomer in over 40 years to discover a Kreutz Sungrazing comet from a ground-based observation. The discovery was made using a Celestron C8 Schmidt–Cassegrain telescope working at f/2.1 with a QHY9 CCD camera.

On 7 September 2013, Lovejoy discovered comet C/2013 R1 (Lovejoy) which became visible to the naked eye in November 2013.

On 17 August 2014, Lovejoy discovered comet C/2014 Q2 (Lovejoy) in the constellation Puppis.

His most recent discovery, C/2017 E4 (Lovejoy), was confirmed on 13 March 2017.

== Gallery ==
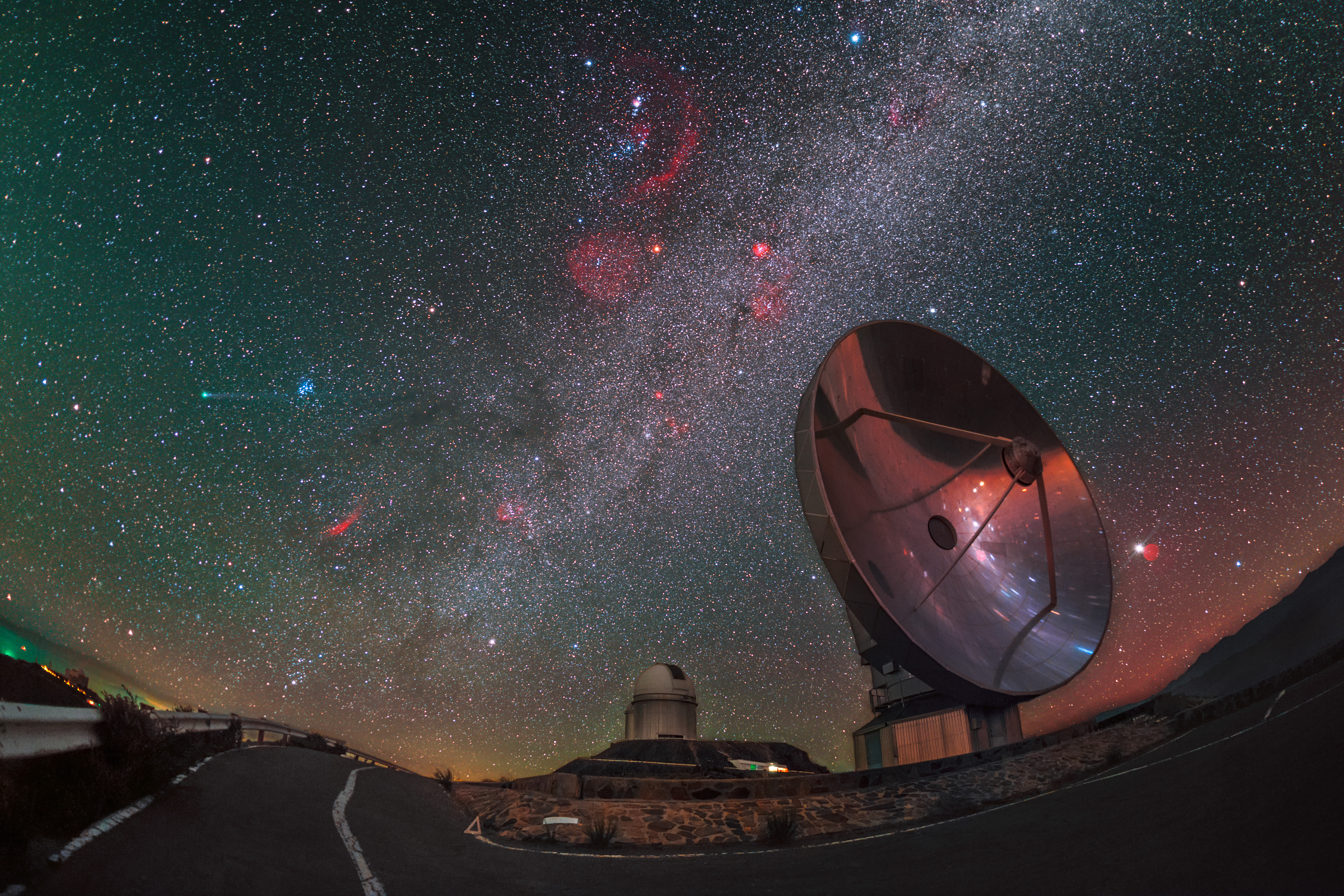
Comet Lovejoy over La Silla Observatory.
