= Comet Ikeya =

Comet Ikeya, or Ikeya's Comet may refer to any of the seven comets discovered by Kaoru Ikeya below:

- 153P/Ikeya–Zhang, the only long-period comet that is given a periodic number.
- 332P/Ikeya–Murakami
- C/1963 A1 (Ikeya)
- C/1964 N1 (Ikeya)
- C/1965 S1 (Ikeya–Seki), also known as the Great Comet of 1965
- C/1966 R1 (Ikeya–Everhart)
- C/1967 Y1 (Ikeya–Seki)
