= List of long-period comets =

Comets with a period from 200 to 1000 years

The following list is of comets with very long orbital periods, defined as between 200 and 1000 years. These comets come from the Kuiper belt and scattered disk, beyond the orbit of Pluto, with possible origins in the Oort cloud for many. For comets with an orbital period of over 1000 years (semi-major axis greater than ~100 AU), see the List of near-parabolic comets.

== 19th century ==
Comet designation	Name/ discoverer(s)	Period (years)	e	a (AU)	q (AU)	i (°)	Abs. mag (M1)	Nucleus radii	Last observed perihelion	Next perihelion	Ref.
C/1811 W1	Pons	755	0.9809	82.881	1.5817	31.2554			1811/11/11	2566	MPC · JPL
C/1840 U1	Bremiker	286	0.9659	43.453	1.48	57.9043			1840/11/14	2126	MPC · JPL
C/1843 D1	Great Comet of 1843	513	0.999914	64.267	0.005527	144.3548	4.9	24.75 km	1843/02/27	2356	MPC · JPL
C/1846 J1	Brorsen	538	0.990414	66.1131	0.63376	150.6809	8.1		1846/06/05	2384	MPC · JPL
C/1853 G1	Schweizer	781	0.989286	84.8136	0.908693	122.1955	6.0		1853/05/10	2634	MPC · JPL
C/1855 G1	Schweizer	500	0.965185	63.0052	2.193526	128.5764			1855/02/05	2355	MPC · JPL
C/1855 L1	Donati	252	0.98578	39.9131	0.567564	156.8707	11.3		1855/05/30	2107	MPC · JPL
C/1857 O1	Peters	235	0.980414	38.1315	0.746843	32.7565			1857/08/24	2092	MPC · JPL
C/1861 G1	Thatcher	415	0.983465	55.6819	0.9207	79.7733			1861/06/03	2276	MPC · JPL
C/1861 J1	Tebbutt	409	0.98507	55.0827	0.822384	85.4424	3.9		1861/06/12	2270	MPC · JPL
C/1874 Q1	Coggia	306	0.962822	45.4028	1.687985	34.1267			1874/07/18	2180	MPC · JPL
C/1882 R1	Great September Comet of 1882	–	–	–	–	–	0.8	29.65 km	1882/09/17	–	MPC · JPL
C/1882 R1-A	Great September Comet of 1882	669	0.999899	76.7327	0.00775	142.0112		9.15 km	1882/09/17	2551	MPC · JPL
C/1882 R1-B	Great September Comet of 1882	759	0.999907	83.3441	0.007751	142.0111		6.0 km	1882/09/17	2641	MPC · JPL
C/1882 R1-C	Great September Comet of 1882	874	0.999915	91.1882	0.007751	142.0105		3.05 km	1882/09/17	2756	MPC · JPL
C/1882 R1-D	Great September Comet of 1882	952	0.99992	96.8625	0.007749	142.0093		3.25 km	1882/09/17	2834	MPC · JPL
C/1882 R1-E	Great September Comet of 1882	–	–	–	–	–		1.5 km	1882/09/17	–	
C/1882 R1-F	Great September Comet of 1882	–	–	–	–	–		6.7 km	1882/09/17	–	
C/1885 R1	Brooks	275	0.982264	42.2389	0.749149	59.097			1885/08/10	2160	MPC · JPL
C/1886 H1	Brooks	768	0.996783	83.8679	0.269803	33.8679			1886/06/07	2654	MPC · JPL
C/1887 B2	Brooks	999	0.983694	99.9721	1.630145	104.2738			1887/03/17	2986	MPC · JPL
C/1894 G1	Gale	958	0.989884	97.176	0.983032	86.9666			1894/04/13	2852	MPC · JPL
C/1898 F1	Perrine	419	0.980454	56.035	1.095261	72.5292			1898/03/17	2317	MPC · JPL

== 20th century ==
=== 1900s to 1950s ===
Comet designation	Name/ discoverer(s)	Period (years)	e	a (AU)	q (AU)	i (°)	Abs. mag (M1)	Nucleus radii	Last observed perihelion	Next perihelion	Ref.
C/1905 F1	Giacobini	220	0.9	36	1.11	40			1905/04/04	2125	MPC · JPL
C/1906 V1	Thiele	420	0.979	56	1.2122	56.35			1906/11/21	2300	MPC · JPL
C/1907 G1	Grigg–Mellish	493	0.98521	62.42	0.924	109.95	10.0		1907/03/28	2400	MPC · JPL
C/1930 F1	Wilk	485	0.992194	61.723	0.48181	67.1409			1930/03/28	2415	MPC · JPL
C/1931 O1	Nagata	357	0.979203	50.3391	1.046903	42.2957	5.7		1931/06/11	2288	MPC · JPL
C/1932 G1	Houghton–Ensor	302	0.972127	45.0052	1.254431	74.2776			1932/02/28	2234	MPC · JPL
C/1932 P1	Peltier–Whipple	291	0.976369	43.8914	1.037198	71.7195	8.1		1932/09/01	2223	MPC · JPL
C/1932 Y1	Dodwell–Forbes	262	0.972386	40.9498	1.130788	24.5025	9.1		1932/12/30	2194	MPC · JPL
C/1935 A1	Johnson	901	0.991304	93.2783	0.811148	65.4251	9.5		1935/02/26	2836	MPC · JPL
C/1936 O1	Kaho–Kozik–Lis	888	0.994389	92.3905	0.518403	121.9417			1936/06/15	2824	MPC · JPL
C/1937 P1	Hubble	599	0.972499	71.0395	1.953657	11.5806			1936/11/14	2535	MPC · JPL
C/1940 O1	Whipple–Paraskevopoulos	425	0.980843	56.4926	1.082228	54.6906			1940/10/08	2365	MPC · JPL
C/1941 B1	Friend–Reese–Honda	355	0.981221	50.1552	0.941864	26.2756			1941/01/20	2296	MPC · JPL

=== 1950s to 1990s ===
Comet designation	Name/ discoverer(s)	Period (years)	e	a (AU)	q (AU)	i (°)	Abs. mag (M1)	Nucleus radii	Last observed perihelion	Next perihelion	Ref.
C/1952 H1	Mrkos	645	0.982816	74.6448	1.282696	112.0282	5.5		1952/06/08	2597	MPC · JPL
C/1955 L1	Mrkos	356	0.989361	50.2321	0.534419	86.5016			1955/06/04	2311	MPC · JPL
C/1961 T1	Seki	759	0.991812	83.1862	0.681129	155.707	16.7		1961/10/10	2720	MPC · JPL
C/1963 A1	Ikeya	932	0.993377	95.446	0.632139	160.6487			1963/03/21	2895	MPC · JPL
C/1963 R1	Pereyra	903	0.999946	93.7963	0.005065	133.5821	5.5	13.7 km	1963/08/23	2866	MPC · JPL
C/1964 N1	Ikeya	391	0.984643	53.5099	0.821752	171.92			1964/08/01	2355	MPC · JPL
C/1965 S1-A	Ikeya–Seki	880	0.999915	91.6	0.007786	141.8642	6.2	4.3 km	1965/10/21	2845	MPC · JPL
C/1973 H1	Huchra	829	0.972977	88.2336	2.384337	48.329	9.3		1973/03/11	2802	MPC · JPL
C/1974 O1	Cesco	551	0.979579	67.2323	1.372951	173.1585			1974/05/12	2525	MPC · JPL
C/1975 T2	Suzuki–Saigusa–Mori	446	0.985653	58.4127	0.838047	118.2332	9.7		1975/10/15	2421	MPC · JPL
C/1979 S1	Meier	391	0.973197	53.4299	1.432081	67.084	4.8		1979/10/17	2370	MPC · JPL
C/1979 Y1	Bradfield	303	0.98792	45.1	0.54526	148.6024	8.4		1979/12/21	2282	MPC · JPL
C/1983 H1	IRAS–Araki–Alcock	968	0.98987	97.86	0.9913399	73.2526	12.599	3.4 km	1983/05/21	2951	MPC · JPL
C/1984 U2	Shoemaker	270	0.970905	41.7429	1.21451	13.8812	10.1		1985/01/03	2255	MPC · JPL
C/1985 T1	Thiele	700	0.983297	78.8565	1.31714	139.0692	9.1		1985/12/19	2685	MPC · JPL
C/1986 E1	Shoemaker	555	0.94678	67.5284	3.593864	159.809			1986/03/11	2541	MPC · JPL
C/1987 B2	Terasako	724	0.995125	80.6195	0.39302	40.8543			1986/12/24	2710	MPC · JPL
C/1992 Q2	Helin–Lawrence	452	0.965365	58.8554	2.038458	106.8481	6.0		1993/03/15	2445	MPC · JPL
C/1992 W1	Ohshita	719	0.99721	80.2191	0.664134	115.1232	12.3		1992/11/01	2711	MPC · JPL
C/1994 E1	Mueller	408	0.968171	55.0218	1.75129	145.1425	11.0		1993/11/28	2401	MPC · JPL
C/1995 Q2	Hartley–Drinkwater	424	0.966518	56.4229	1.889153	168.0075	9.7		1995/08/02	2419	MPC · JPL
C/1997 O1	Tilbrook	811	0.98422	86.96	1.371807	115.8024	8		1997/07/13	2808	MPC · JPL
C/1998 K1	Mueller	491	0.94511	62.2	3.41659	35.6361	8		1998/09/01	2489	MPC · JPL
C/1998 K5	LINEAR	616	0.98669	72.39	0.9635469	9.92714	16.1	0.55 km	1998/07/17	2613	MPC · JPL
C/1999 L3	LINEAR	683.5	0.97437	77.59	1.988917	166.09928	8.8		2000/01/04	2683/06/01	MPC · JPL

== 21st century ==
=== 2000s ===
Comet designation	Name/ discoverer(s)	Period (years)	e	a (AU)	q (AU)	i (°)	Abs. mag (M1)	Nucleus radii	Last observed perihelion	Next perihelion	Ref.
C/2000 J1	Ferris	370	0.951	51	2.5417	98.78	14.2		2000/05/11	2370	MPC · JPL
C/2001 S1	Skiff	388	0.9295	53.2	3.749	139.1322	5.9		2001/06/02	2389	MPC · JPL
C/2002 Q2	LINEAR	420	0.977	56	1.3029	96.76	16.4		2002/08/17	~2450	MPC · JPL
C/2003 H2	LINEAR	235.9	0.94293	38.18	2.17853	72.218	14.2		2003/05/17	2239/05/01	MPC · JPL
C/2003 K1	Spacewatch	250	0.947	40	2.086	129.81	14.4		2002/12/20	2250	MPC · JPL
C/2003 S4-A	LINEAR	224	0.895	36.9	3.874	40.71	12.3		2004/05/30	2230	MPC · JPL
C/2003 S4-B	LINEAR	253	0.904	40	3.84	40.43	12.4		2004/05/23	2250	MPC · JPL
C/2004 DZ_{61}	Catalina–LINEAR	309.81	0.956027	45.786	2.01333	66.80929	12.4	2.5 km	2004/05/26	2314/04/01	MPC · JPL
C/2004 HV_{60}	Spacewatch	347.80	0.938	49.46	3.07	92.53	13	1.7 km	2003/12/16	2351	MPC · JPL
C/2004 K3	LINEAR	438	0.9809	57.7	1.10334	111.9279	16.9	0.7 km	2004/06/30	2440	MPC · JPL
C/2005 H1	LINEAR	314.4	0.89687	46.24	4.7686	81.5121	9.8		2004/10/28	2319/04/01	MPC · JPL
C/2005 N4	Catalina	444	0.9604	58.2	2.30373	116.6298	14.2		2005/07/02	2450	MPC · JPL
C/2005 O1	NEAT	365	0.9297	51.1	3.5909	155.981	6.3		2005/05/17	2370	MPC · JPL
C/2005 P3	SWAN	279	0.98768	42.7	0.52578	89.708	14.2		2005/08/09	2285	MPC · JPL
C/2006 S5	Hill	961.7	0.973002	97.430	2.630434	10.13138	9.6		2007/12/09	2969/08/28	MPC · JPL
C/2007 D2	Spacewatch	420	0.97771	56	1.2457	178.618	15.4	0.9 km	2006/11/24	2425	MPC · JPL
C/2007 E1	Garradd	524.06	0.980218	65.001	1.2858628	174.394	13.7		2007/05/23	2531/06/01	MPC · JPL
C/2007 H2	Skiff	351.67	0.9717	49.822	1.4105	52.191	15.9		2007/02/17	2358	MPC · JPL
C/2007 K5	Lovejoy	340	0.9766	49	1.1491	64.884	12		2007/05/01	2350	MPC · JPL
C/2007 T5	Gibbs	320.98	0.91362	46.88	4.049254	45.61521	10		2008/05/24	2328/05/01	MPC · JPL
C/2008 H1	LINEAR	371	0.9465	51.6	2.76026	75.492	10.4		2008/03/16	2380	MPC · JPL
C/2008 J5	Garradd	616	0.97288	72.4	1.96384	93.271	10.6		2008/04/01	2625	MPC · JPL
C/2008 X3	LINEAR	289.6	0.95654	43.77	1.90213	66.4751	11.8		2008/10/10	2298	MPC · JPL
C/2009 B2	LINEAR	270	0.9443	41.8	2.32762	156.873	13		2009/03/07	2279	MPC · JPL
C/2009 E1	Itagaki	254.67	0.985073	40.177	0.5997215	127.4534	13.5		2009/04/07	2263/12/01	MPC · JPL
C/2009 F5	McNaught	718	0.972	80.2	2.24534	84.9905	10.2	8.355 km	2008/11/04	2726	MPC · JPL
C/2009 K4	Gibbs	268	0.9628	41.6	1.5489	34.8248	13.8		2009/06/19	2280	MPC · JPL

=== 2010s ===
Comet designation	Name/ discoverer(s)	Period (years)	e	a (AU)	q (AU)	i (°)	Abs. mag (M1)	Nucleus radii	Last observed perihelion	Next perihelion	Ref.
C/2010 D4	WISE	520.1	0.88947	64.67	7.14822	105.65965	8.4	12.8 km	2009/03/30	2519/05/01	MPC · JPL
C/2010 DG_{56}	WISE	555	0.97644	67.54	1.591452	160.41734	14.3	0.755 km	2010/05/15	2565	MPC · JPL
C/2010 F1	Boattini	566	0.9476	68.4	3.58752	64.936	6.3	4.575 km	2009/11/10	2575	MPC · JPL
C/2010 F3	Scotti	497.7	0.91327	62.8	5.44669	4.64758	9.8		2010/08/04	2508	MPC · JPL
C/2010 G2	Hill	943.41	0.9794077	96.19	1.9807735	103.745293	9	3.37 km	2011/09/02	2955/02/01	MPC · JPL
C/2010 J1	Boattini	222.5	0.9538	36.72	1.69566	134.3849	11.4	2.485 km	2010/02/04	2232	MPC · JPL
C/2010 KW_{7}	WISE	997.7	0.97425	99.84	2.570441	147.06087	12.3	2.845 km	2010/10/11	3008	MPC · JPL
C/2010 L4	WISE	717	0.9647	80.1	2.8255	102.818	12.8	1.7 km	2010/02/23	2726	MPC · JPL
C/2011 KP36	Spacewatch	238.03	0.872862	38.4077	4.883081	18.985920	7.3	27.55 km	2016/05/27	2254/06/05	MPC · JPL
C/2011 Q4	SWAN	282.35	0.974157	43.039	1.112228	147.84307	11.8		2011/09/21	2294/01/27	MPC · JPL
C/2011 W3	Lovejoy	698	0.9999294	78.7	0.0055538	134.356	15.3	0.455 km	2011/12/16	2710	MPC · JPL
C/2012 F1	Gibbs	630	0.965	74	2.5509	129.3968	13.8		2012/02/19	2645	MPC · JPL
C/2012 Y1	LINEAR	233.8	0.94687	37.95	2.0162	20.9594	15.1		2013/01/18	2246	MPC · JPL
C/2013 J6	Catalina	463	0.9596	59.9	2.41572	85.055	12.7		2013/04/09	2475	MPC · JPL
C/2013 K1	Christensen	713	0.98811	79.8	0.948263	42.3415	18.4		2013/05/30	2725	MPC · JPL
C/2013 N4	Borisov	333	0.974805	48.04	1.210405	37.03523	10.6	2.64 km	2013/08/21	2346	MPC · JPL
C/2013 PE_{67}	Catalina–Spacewatch	415.1	0.966806	55.64	1.847072	116.71754	13.3	3.25 km	2013/12/09	2429/01/01	MPC · JPL
C/2013 UQ4	Catalina	471.43	0.9821538	60.572	1.08097487	145.25856	11.4	3.085 km	2014/07/05	2485/12/09	MPC · JPL
C/2014 G3	PanSTARRS	421	0.9164	56.2	4.6986	155.8268	5.5		2015/02/02	2436	MPC · JPL
C/2014 S3	PanSTARRS	900	0.977	90	2.049	169.321	17.7	0.25–0.7 km	2014/08/13	2900	MPC · JPL
C/2015 D4	Borisov	700	0.98907	78.8	0.86168	77.3017	9.4		2014/10/28	2714	MPC · JPL
C/2015 F2	Polonia	237.6	0.96844	38.36	1.210552	28.6937	14.9	1.3 km	2015/04/28	2252/11/29	MPC · JPL
C/2015 T4	PanSTARRS	812.2	0.973620	87.05	2.296376	87.91718	7.0	3.78 km	2016/06/18	2828	MPC · JPL
C/2016 A8	LINEAR	207.6	0.94635	35.06	1.881129	148.21184	10.3	0.877 km	2016/08/30	2224	MPC · JPL
C/2016 C2	NEOWISE	512	0.97563	64.00	1.559751	38.1565	13.8	1.755 km	2016/04/19	2528	MPC · JPL
C/2016 R3	Borisov	997.76	0.9955	99.849	0.4468	53.067	18.1		2016/10/10	3014	MPC · JPL
C/2017 A1	PanSTARRS	800	0.974	90	2.290	49.81	13.1		2017/05/17	2800	MPC · JPL
C/2017 A3	Elenin	285.45	0.911	43.35	3.8545	98.5	9.7		2017/01/30	2302	MPC · JPL
C/2017 C2	PanSTARRS	976.33	0.9753	98.414	2.431	118.584	12		2017/01/21	2993	MPC · JPL
C/2018 E1	ATLAS	403.05	0.9504	54.5634	2.7055	72.4796	11.7		2018/4/17	2421	MPC · JPL
C/2019 A9	PanSTARRS	242.22	0.9633	38.8574	1.4264	84.3402	9.0		2019/07/26	2261	MPC · JPL
C/2019 J1	Lemmon	609.24	0.96551	71.8650	2.4788	24.5502	11.8		2019/04/09	2628	MPC · JPL
C/2019 O2	PanSTARRS	434.1	0.8311	57.22	9.683	93.287	10.1		2023/04/07	2457	MPC · JPL
C/2019 Y4-D	ATLAS	491.16	0.996	62.25	0.25	45.88	13.5		2020/05/31	2511	MPC · JPL

=== 2020s ===
Comet designation	Name/ discoverer(s)	Period (years)	e	a (AU)	q (AU)	i (°)	Abs. mag (M1)	Nucleus radii	Last observed perihelion	Next perihelion	Ref.
C/2020 B2	Lemmon	559.27	0.959	67.88	2.768	55.704	17.2		2020/01/26	2579	MPC · JPL
C/2020 K4	PanSTARRS	299.66	0.9604	44.7795	1.7723	125.907	16.9		2020/03/06	2320	MPC · JPL
C/2020 PV_{6}	PanSTARRS	269.29	0.94495	41.702	2.296	128.24	7.5	12.01 km	2021/09/25	2290	MPC · JPL
C/2020 Q1	Borisov	454.78	0.97776	59.137	1.315	142.924	11.6	1.306 km	2020/08/14	2501	MPC · JPL
C/2020 R4	ATLAS	933.77	0.98924	95.5331	1.0283	164.462	16.0	2.01 km	2021/03/01	2955	MPC · JPL
C/2020 U3	Rankin	519.34	0.96477	64.61	2.2762	30.177	11.9		2021/02/05	2540	MPC · JPL
C/2020 X4	Leonard	312.03	0.88679	46.00	5.2083	80.4859	9.1		2020/11/11	2332	MPC · JPL
C/2021 A4	NEOWISE	280.22	0.97325	42.82	1.1455	111.57	13.7	1.165 km	2021/03/20	2301	MPC · JPL
C/2021 A10	NEOWISE	894.04	0.98633	92.804	1.269	151.52	19.6	1.275 km	2021/03/15	2915	MPC · JPL
C/2021 B2	NEOWISE	206.66	0.9382	34.953	2.160	119.49	13.9		2021/03/10	2227	MPC · JPL
C/2021 C3	Catalina	503.89	0.9640	63.321	2.2765	122.16	16.1		2021/02/12	2525	MPC · JPL
C/2021 D1	SWAN	947.05	0.9904	96.44	0.9018	31.27	13.3		2021/02/27	2969	MPC · JPL
C/2021 G1	Leonard	646.49	0.9547	75.535	3.424	131.57	13.7		2021/07/22	2667	MPC · JPL
C/2021 Q3	ATLAS	641.70	0.9300	74.396	5.205	77.78	6.8		2022/01/26	2662	MPC · JPL
C/2021 U4	Leonard	300.59	0.9601	44.872	1.787	152.88	18.8		2021/12/21	2322	MPC · JPL
C/2022 J1	Maury–Attard	329.62	0.9664	47.716	1.604	105.93	11.9	1.685 km	2022/02/19	2351	MPC · JPL
C/2022 J2	Bok	877.30	0.9801	91.642	1.827	149.09	18.3	2.215 km	2022/10/27	2900	MPC · JPL
C/2022 JK_{5}	PanSTARRS	283.53	0.9377	43.158	2.687	16.83	13.46	11.59 km	2023/04/28	2306	MPC · JPL
C/2022 N1	Attard–Maury	224.28	0.9599	36.913	1.482	164.74	14.9	1.085 km	2022/09/10	2247	MPC · JPL
C/2022 U2	ATLAS	937.03	0.9861	95.755	1.328	48.25	13.5	1.95 km	2023/01/14	2960	MPC · JPL
C/2022 V2	Lemmon	223.12	0.944	36.786	2.064	98.91	13.6	4.29 km	2023/11/01	2246	MPC · JPL
C/2023 P1	Nishimura	434.7	0.996	57.386	0.225	132.47	12.7	3.015 km	2023/09/17	2431	MPC · JPL
C/2023 TD_{22}	Lemmon	334.1	0.951	48.18	2.356	170.49	12.7		2024/09/16	2358	MPC · JPL
C/2024 C4	ATLAS	774.2	0.983	84.31	1.471	79.29	13.2		2024/01/20	2798	MPC · JPL
C/2024 E2	Bok	382.1	0.854	52.66	7.692	155.66	8.6		2023/10/22	2405	MPC · JPL
C/2024 Q4	PanSTARRS	349.25	0.893	49.593	5.328	3.34	10.2		2024/12/18	2373	MPC · JPL
C/2024 S1	ATLAS	946.47	0.99992	96.397	0.0080	141.90	15.3	0.6 km	2024/10/28	–	MPC · JPL
C/2025 K4	Siverd	256.7	0.937	40.39	2.534	38.499	13.7		2025/07/27	2312	MPC · JPL
C/2025 R1	ATLAS	341.5	0.95965	48.86	1.975	110.03	13.9		2025/11/24	2367	MPC · JPL
C/2025 R2	SWAN	619	0.99306	72.65	0.504	4.47	12.2	0.3–1.0 km	2025/09/12	2644	MPC · JPL
C/2026 AZ_{17}	Bok	520.67	0.96179	64.72	2.472	36.23	9.1		2026/11/23	2548	MPC · JPL
C/2026 B2	Sun–Gao	228.5	0.96582	37.37	1.277	59.70	13.7		2026/01/09	2254	MPC · JPL
C/2026 M5	PanSTARRS	685.1	0.93587	77.71	4.984	147.5	8.8		2026/10/28	2712	MPC · JPL
C/2026 Q1	ATLAS	234.9	0.94425	38.07	2.123	65.77	12.5		2026/07/17	2261	MPC · JPL
Used sources: 1. MPC—List Periodic Comet Numbers; 2. IAU–CBAT: 200 Most Recent IAUCs; 3. IAU–CBAT: Astronomical Headlines; 4. PDS SBN—Planetary Data System Small Bodies Node: Periodic Comet Names and Designations; 5. JPL Small-Body Database Browser

== See also ==
- List of comets by type
  - List of numbered comets
  - List of Halley-type comets
  - List of periodic comets
  - List of near-parabolic comets
  - List of parabolic and hyperbolic comets
  - List of Kreutz sungrazers
  - List of comets with no meaningful orbit
