= Comet Seki =

Comet Seki or Seki's Comet may refer to any of the six comets discovered by Tsutomu Seki below:

- C/1961 T1 (Seki)
- C/1962 C1 (Seki–Lines), also known as the Great Comet of 1962
- C/1965 S1 (Ikeya–Seki), also known as the Great Comet of 1965
- C/1967 C1 (Seki)
- C/1967 Y1 (Ikeya–Seki)
- C/1970 U1 (Suzuki–Sato–Seki)
