= Comet Donati (disambiguation) =

Comet Donati, formally designated as C/1858 L1, is a great comet that appeared in 1858. Comet Donati may also refer to:

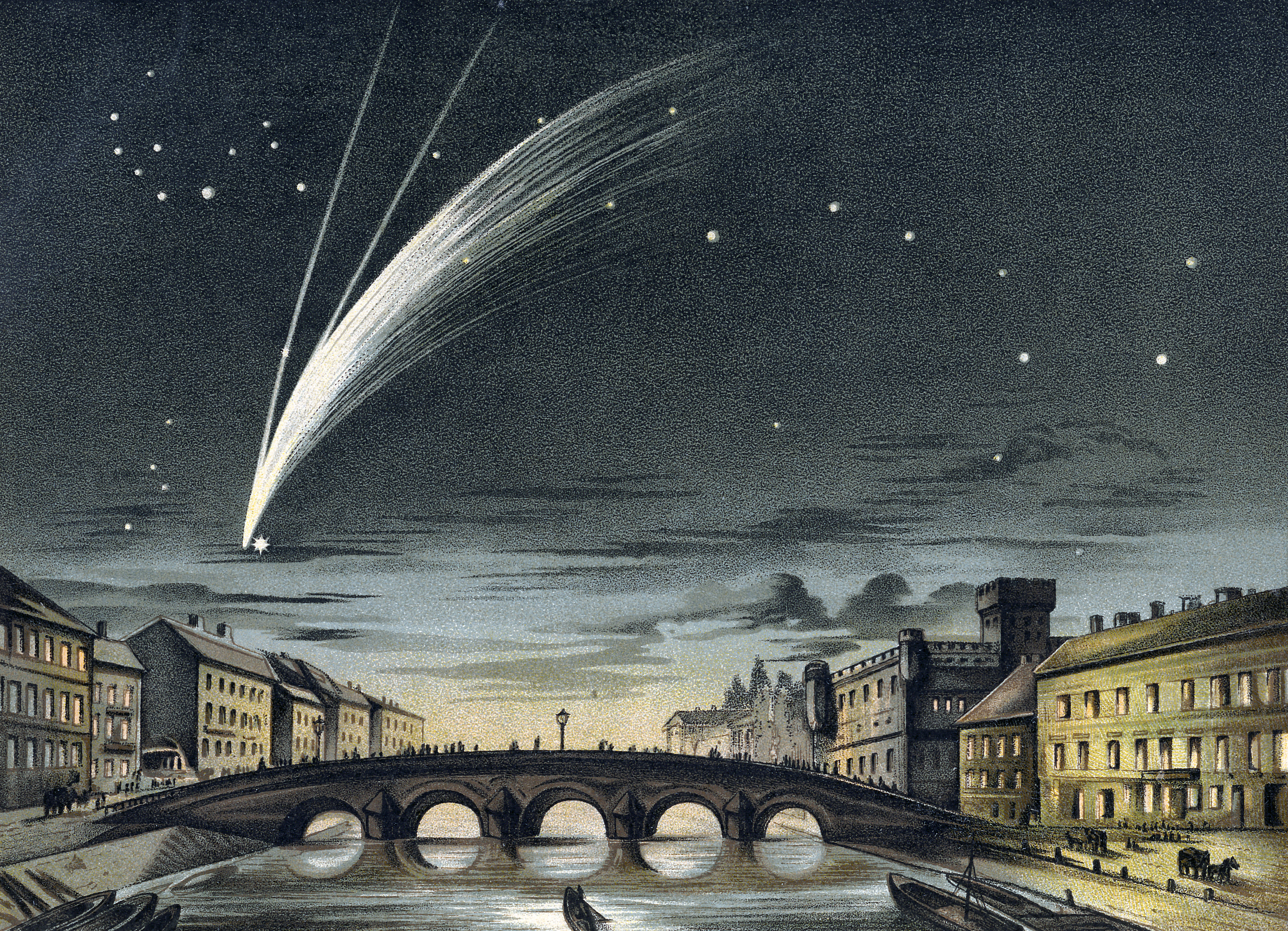
C/1858 L1 (Donati)

- C/1855 L1 (Donati), a long-period comet discovered in 1855
- C/1857 V1 (Donati–van Arsdale), a parabolic comet discovered by Giovanni Battista Donati and Robert van Arsdale in 1857
- C/1864 O1 (Donati–Toussaint), a non-periodic comet discovered by Giovanni Battista Donati and Carlo Toussaint in 1864
- C/1864 R1 (Donati), a parabolic comet discovered in 1864
