= List of comets discovered by the Catalina Sky Survey =

These are all the comets discovered by the Catalina Sky Survey since 1998.

== Periodic comets ==
- 257P/Catalina
- 300P/Catalina
- 330P/Catalina
- 346P/Catalina
- 367P/Catalina
- 403P/Catalina
- 459P/Catalina
- 499P/Catalina
- P/1999 XN120 (Catalina)
- P/2007 C2 (Catalina)
- P/2009 WX51 (Catalina)
- P/2013 AL76 (Catalina)
- P/2015 W2 (Catalina)

== Non-periodic comets ==
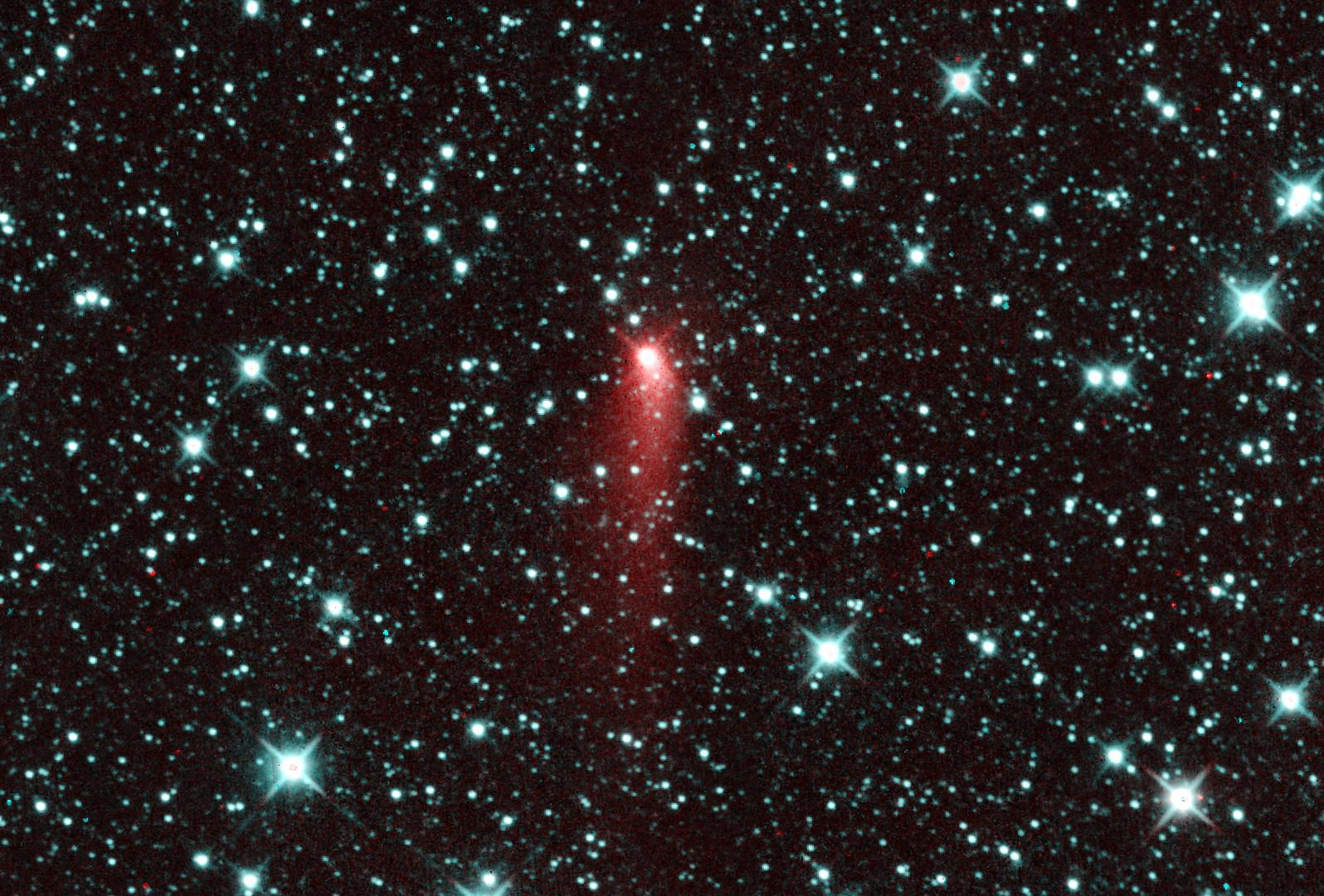
C/2013 UQ4

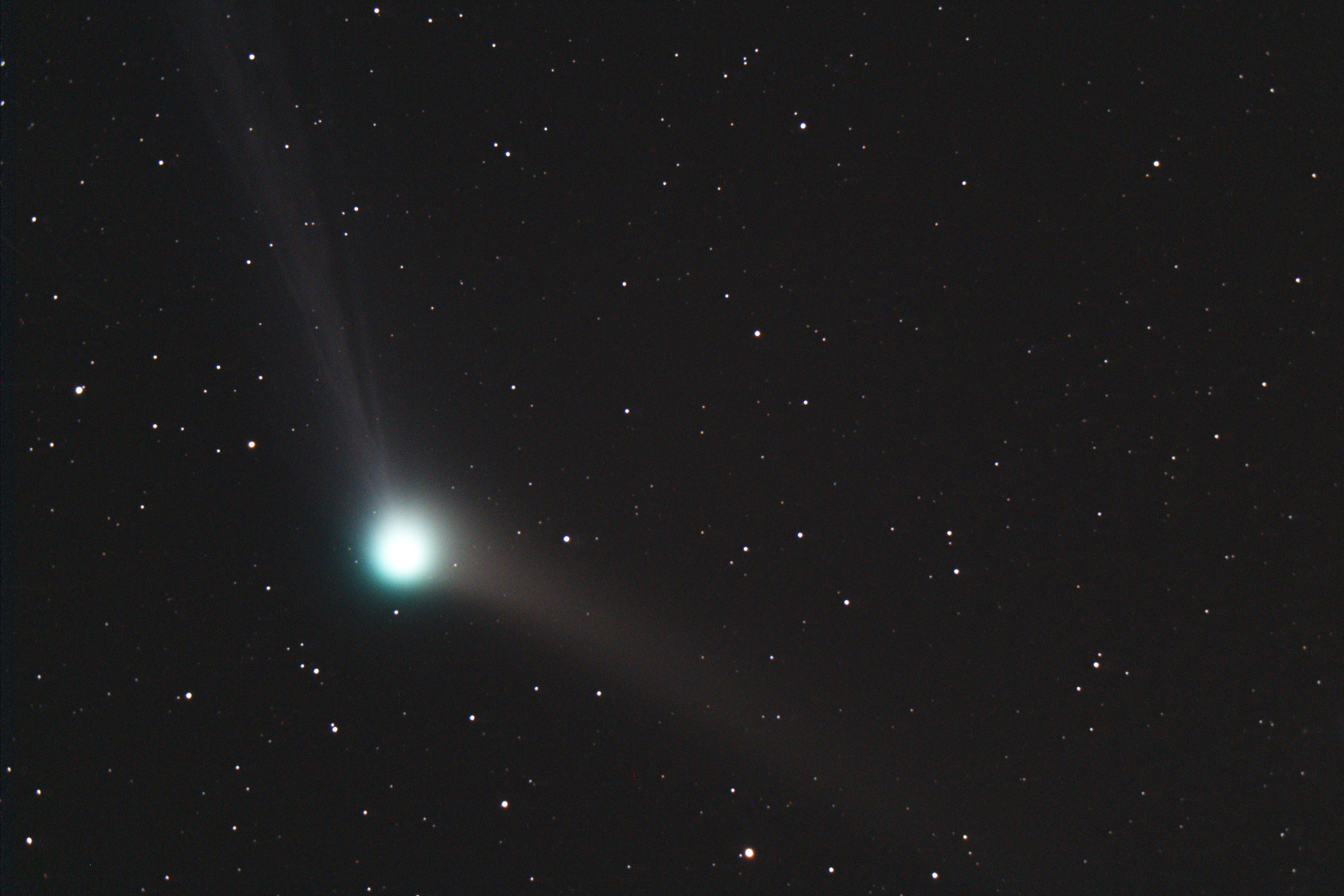
C/2013 US10

- C/1999 F1 (Catalina)
- C/2004 K1 (Catalina)
- C/2005 J2 (Catalina)
- C/2005 N4 (Catalina)
- C/2005 N5 (Catalina)
- C/2006 A2 (Catalina)
- C/2006 CK10 (Catalina)
- C/2006 V1 (Catalina)
- C/2007 M2 (Catalina)
- C/2008 E1 (Catalina)
- C/2009 K2 (Catalina)
- C/2009 O2 (Catalina)
- C/2009 Y1 (Catalina)
- C/2010 L3 (Catalina)
- C/2012 J1 (Catalina)
- C/2013 B2 (Catalina)
- C/2013 F2 (Catalina)
- C/2013 G5 (Catalina)
- C/2013 J6 (Catalina)
- C/2013 L2 (Catalina)
- C/2013 S1 (Catalina)
- C/2013 U1 (Catalina)
- C/2013 UQ4 (Catalina)
- C/2013 US10 (Catalina)
- C/2013 V4 (Catalina)
- C/2014 AA52 (Catalina)
- C/2014 J1 (Catalina)
- C/2014 M3 (Catalina)
- C/2014 TG64 (Catalina)
- C/2014 W6 (Catalina)
- C/2015 X2 (Catalina)
- C/2016 KA (Catalina)
- C/2017 S6 (Catalina)
- C/2018 M1 (Catalina)
- C/2018 W1 (Catalina)
- C/2021 C3 (Catalina)
- C/2021 K3 (Catalina)
- C/2021 U5 (Catalina)
- C/2022 L1 (Catalina)

== Others ==
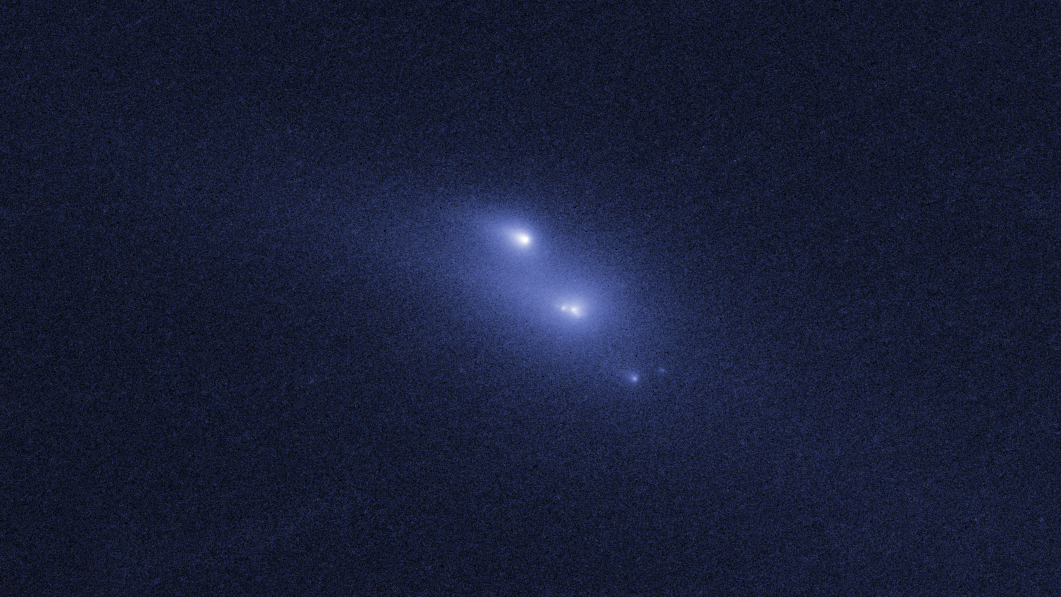
P/2013 R3

Comet Catalina may also refer to a partial reference to any comets co-discovered with the Catalina Sky Survey:

- 227P/Catalina–LINEAR
- 299P/Catalina–PANSTARRS
- 319P/Catalina–McNaught
- 329P/LINEAR–Catalina
- 395P/Catalina–NEAT
- C/1999 U4 (Catalina–Skiff)
- C/2006 YC (Catalina–Christensen)
- P/2013 R3 (Catalina–PANSTARRS)
- C/2020 K8 (Catalina–ATLAS)
