= NGC 3675 =

Galaxy in the constellation Ursa Major

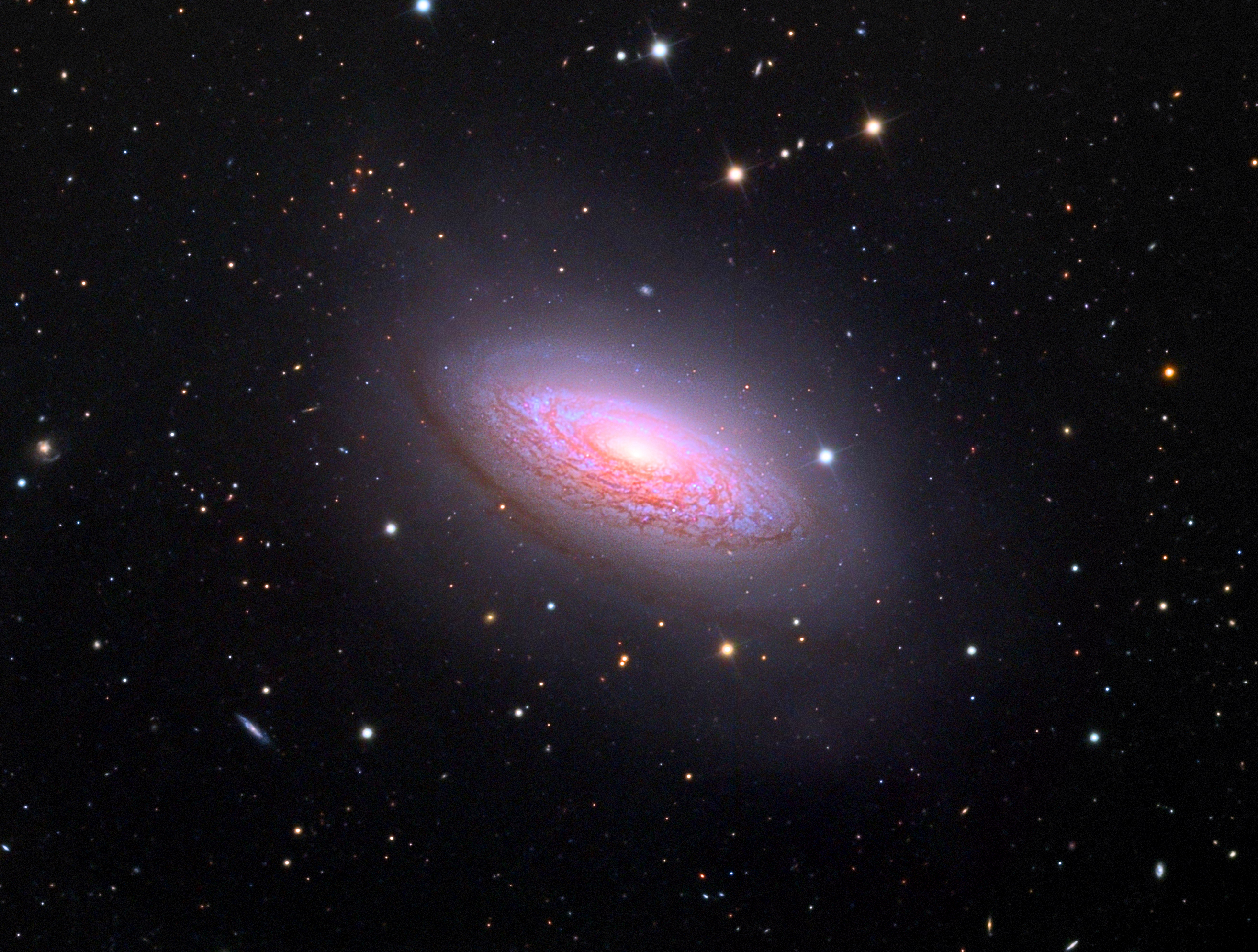
- NGC 3675 in Schulman telescope

Observation data (J2000 epoch)
- Constellation: Ursa Major
- Right ascension: 11^{h} 26^{m} 08.5689^{s}
- Declination: +43° 35′ 09.696″
- Redshift: 0.002568
- Heliocentric radial velocity: 770±1 km/s
- Distance: 53 ± 10 Mly (16.2 ± 3.1 Mpc)
- Apparent magnitude (V): 10.0

Characteristics
- Type: SA(s)b
- Size: ~105,700 ly (32.41 kpc) (estimated)
- Apparent size (V): 5.9′ × 3.1′

Other designations
- IRAS 11234+4351, NGC 3675, UGC 6439, MCG +07-24-004, PGC 35164, CGCG 214-005

NGC 3675 is a spiral galaxy located in the northern constellation of Ursa Major. It is located at a distance of about 50 million light years from Earth, which, given its apparent dimensions, means that NGC 3675 is about 100,000 light years across. It was discovered by German-British astronomer William Herschel on 14 January 1788. NGC 3675 belongs to the Ursa Major Cluster, part of the Virgo Supercluster.

It hosts a low-ionization nuclear emission-line region (LINER). In the nucleus lies a supermassive black hole with an estimated mass of 10-39 million M_{☉}, based on the intrinsic velocity dispersion as measured by the Hubble Space Telescope. Although the galaxy was reported to have a strong bar visible in infrared images, there has been no indication of a bar in further observations. Its spiral disk is of type III and there is a dust structure which is more prominent to the east. The galaxy features two ring structures, with diameter 1.62 and 2.42 arcminutes. The spiral arms are tightly wound and form an inner pseudoring and they continue for one revolution outside the ring. The outer arms are very patchy and filamentary.

== Supernova ==
One supernova has been observed in NGC 3675: SN 1984R (type unknown, mag. 13) was discovered by Kaoru Ikeya on 2 December 1984.

== Gallery ==
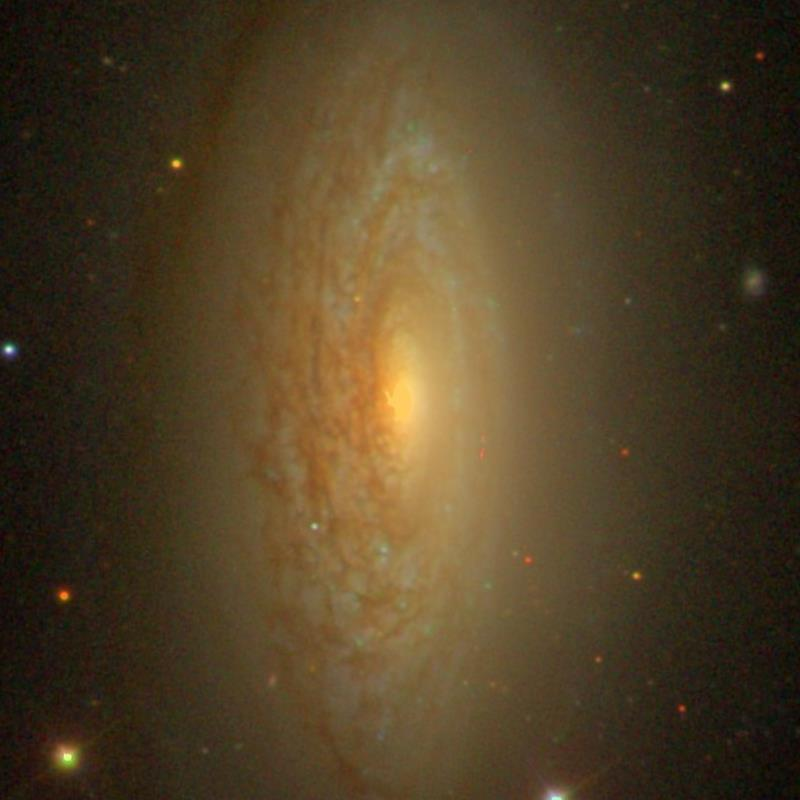
NGC 3675 (SDSS DR14)

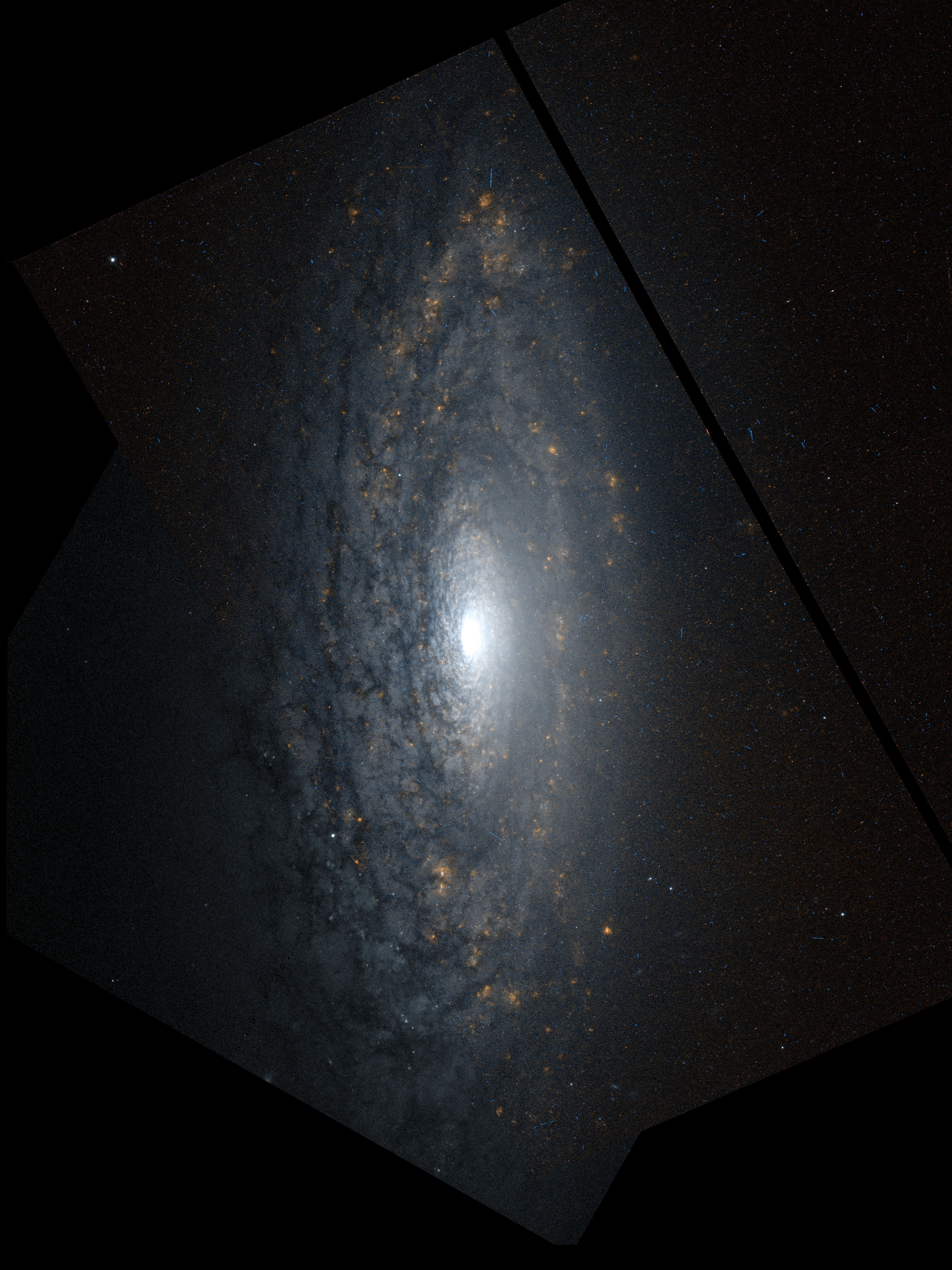
NGC 3675 (HST)

== See also ==
- List of NGC objects (3001–4000)
