= C/1975 T2 (Suzuki–Saigusa–Mori) =

Long-period comet

Discovery
- Discovered by: Shigenori Suzuki; Yoshikazu Saigusa; Hiroaki Mori
- Discovery site: Japan
- Discovery date: 5 October 1975

Designations
- Alternative designations: 1975 X, 1975k

Orbital characteristics
- Epoch: 31 October 1975 (JD 2442716.5)
- Observation arc: 90 days
- Number of observations: 112
- Aphelion: 115.6 AU
- Perihelion: 0.838 AU
- Semi-major axis: 58.2 AU
- Eccentricity: 0.9856
- Orbital period: 444 years
- Inclination: 118.233°
- Longitude of ascending node: 216.805°
- Argument of periapsis: 152.020°
- Last perihelion: 15 October 1975
- Next perihelion: ~2410
- T_{Jupiter}: -0.446
- Earth MOID: 0.099 AU
- Jupiter MOID: 1.28 AU
- Comet total magnitude (M1): 9.7

C/1975 T2 (Suzuki–Saigusa–Mori) is a long-period comet discovered on 5 October 1975. The comet approached Earth at a distance of 0.1 AU (15 million km) on 31 October 1975 and became visible with the naked eye. The comet has been associated with the lambda Ursae Majorids meteor shower.

== Observational history ==
The comet was discovered independently on 5 October 1975 by five Japanese observers, Shigenori Suzuki from Aichi, Yoshikazu Saigusa from Kofu, Yamanashi, Hiroaki Mori from Mugegawa, Gifu, Kiyomi Okazaki from Kahoku, Yamagata and Shigeru Furuyama from Tone, Ibaraki, all within 30 minutes. By international agreement, comets bear the names of the three discoverers whose telegrams arrive first at the Central Bureau for Astronomical Telegrams. C/1975 T2 therefore is appended Suzuki–Saigusa–Mori.

Mori had also co-discovered another comet, C/1975 T1 (Mori–Sato–Fujikawa), 70 minutes before spotting C/1975 T2, the first time a person discovered two comets in one night. Mori was using 20×120 binoculars while the other discovers were using reflector telescopes. The comet was also discovered independently by Giovanni Casari from Novi di Modena on 6 October.

Upon discovery the comet was described as diffuse, without central concentration or tail, and an apparent magnitude of 9. The comet displayed very little apparent motion, as it was heading towards Earth. The comet brightened rapidly as it passed perihelion on 15 October and then moved towards Earth, with the closest approach taking place on 31 October. On 20 October 1975 the comet had brightened to a magnitude of 8. On 22 October John Bortle estimated its magnitude to be 6.8. On 28 October he estimated its magnitude to 5.5, while the coma had increased in size from 5 arcminutes on 12 October to 12 arcminutes on 28 October. Also on 28 October, Bortle reported that the comet had a tail about one degree long and a diffuse halo about one degree across.

As the comet approached Earth, it moved between the Sun and Earth, and on 31 October it was at a solar elongation of 5 degrees. On 31 October was also the closest approach to Earth, passing at a distance of 0.104 AU (15.6 million km; 9.7 million mi) on 31 October 1975, 14:43 (UTC). That was, along with the equally close approach of C/1961 T1 (Seki), the closest observed approach of a comet to Earth since 1930. The comet was moving southwards and was recovered on 3 November. On 4 November T. Morgan from Sydney Observatory estimated its magnitude to be 4. On 6 November David Seargent spotted the comet with the naked eye, estimating an apparent magnitude of 4.8. By 12 November the comet the comet had faded to a magnitude of 7.2. On December 2 the magnitude had dropped to 9.5. The comet was last detected on 4 January 1976.

== Meteor showers ==
The possibility that the comet could produce a meteor shower was suggested by Vladimir Guth and I. Hasegawa on 30 October 1975, as the comet approached its ascending node. However no definite activity was observed. Meteors that could have been created by the comet were detected in cameras of the Croatian Meteor Network and the SonotaCo from 2007 to 2011 and were named the λ Ursae Majorids. The shower peaks on 28 October. The link was confirmed with numerical models. The comet has also been suggested to be the parent body of the October Ursae Majorids, which were first observed in 2006.

== See also ==
- C/2023 H2 (Lemmon) – a comet with similar orbit
