= C/1964 N1 (Ikeya) =

Long-period comet

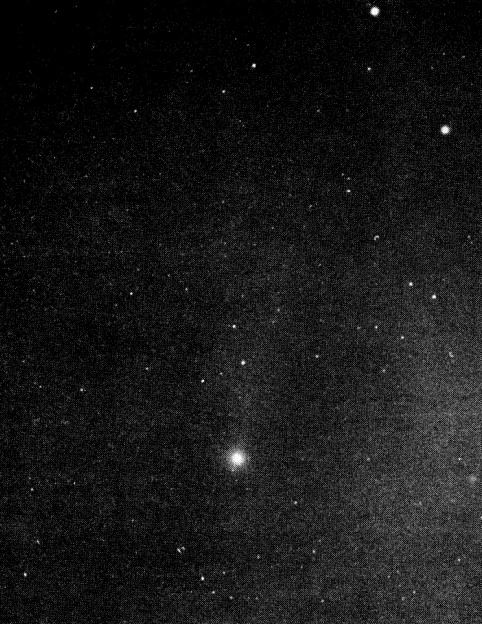
- Comet Ikeya (1964f) photographed by Dennis Milon on 27 July 1964

Discovery
- Discovered by: Kaoru Ikeya
- Discovery date: 3 July 1964

Designations
- Alternative designations: 1964f

Orbital characteristics
- Epoch: 1964-Jul-28.0
- Observation arc: 56 days
- Number of observations: 36
- Aphelion: 110.97 AU
- Perihelion: 0.822 AU
- Semi-major axis: 55.90 AU
- Eccentricity: 0.9853
- Orbital period: 418 years
- Inclination: 171.92°
- Longitude of ascending node: 269.95°
- Argument of periapsis: 290.77°
- Last perihelion: 1 August 1964
- Earth MOID: 0.041 AU
- Jupiter MOID: 0.267 AU

Physical characteristics
- Comet nuclear magnitude (M2): 16.0
- Apparent magnitude: 2.7 (1964 apparition)

C/1964 N1 (Ikeya), also known as Comet 1964f, is a long-period comet discovered by Kaoru Ikeya on 3 July 1964. The comet last passed perihelion on 1 August 1964, when it reached an apparent magnitude of 2.7.

== Observational history ==
The comet was discovered by the Japanese amateur astronomer Kaoru Ikeya on 3 July 1964. It was the second comet discovered by Kaoru Ikeya, after C/1963 A1. The comet was located in the morning sky, in the constellation of Taurus, at the star cluster Hyades, and had an estimated apparent magnitude of 8. The comet was moving southeast.

The comet brightened during July and was observed with the naked eye on July 19 by Jim Young from the Table Mountain Observatory. It reached perihelion on 1 August 1964. By 6 August it was visible by naked eye while it passed 1-2° from Rigel. After that it was difficult to observe, being located in the morning twilight. The closest approach to Earth was on August 12, at a distance of about 0.2 AU (30 million km; 19 million mi) and at a solar elongation of 31°. On August 15 the comet was reported by S. Archer from Australia to have a magnitude of 2.8 and its tail to be 4.5 degrees long. The comet became visible from the northern hemisphere in the evening sky in late August, located low, near the horizon, and had faded noticeably.

On 2 September the comet was estimated to have a magnitude of 6.5 and by 12 September it was 8.5. The comet was last detected on 7 October 1964, when it had a magnitude of 10.4.

== Scientific results ==
The spectrum of the comet was obtained on 29 and 30 July by the Mount Wilson Observatory and photoelectric measurements made it possible to measure the relative abundances. The spectrum revealed the presence of C2, C3, CH, and CN. The N(CH)/N(CN) and N(C3)/N(CN) were both about 0.3 in the coma near the cometary nucleus.

== Meteor showers ==
The comet is thought to be the parent body of a number of meteor showers, as it has been modeled to create four streams that intersect with the orbit of Earth. The first meteor shower to be associated with C/1964 N1 (Ikeya) is the July ξ Arietids. The comet is also believed to be the parent of body of the meteor shower ϵ-Geminids and it is also possible that it could be the parent body of ξ-Geminids. All these showers are diffuse and have few meteors.
