= Zhang Daqing =

Chinese amateur astronomer (born 1969)

Zhang Daqing (Chinese: 张大庆) (born October 23, 1969) is a Chinese amateur astronomer. He is from Henan province.

He co-discovered periodic comet 153P/Ikeya–Zhang. He is the first Chinese amateur astronomer who has a comet named after him. He is also a telescope maker. Periodic comet 153P/Ikeya-Zhang was discovered by his self-made telescope on February 1, 2002.
