= C/2020 R4 (ATLAS) =

Long-period comet

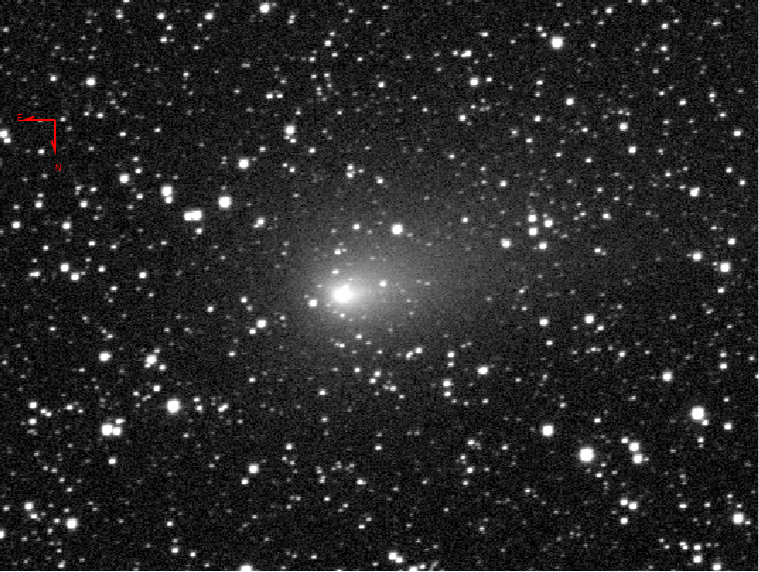
- Comet C/2020 R4 (ATLAS) photographed by the Zwicky Transient Facility on 2 April 2021.

Discovery
- Discovery site: ATLAS–MLO (T08)
- Discovery date: 12 September 2020

Designations
- Alternative designations: CK20R040

Orbital characteristics
- Epoch: 13 March 2021 (JD 2459286.5)
- Observation arc: 1.50 years
- Earliest precovery date: 29 August 2020
- Number of observations: 2,399
- Aphelion: 192.40 AU
- Perihelion: 1.029 AU
- Semi-major axis: 96.713 AU
- Eccentricity: 0.98936
- Orbital period: ~950 years
- Inclination: 164.46°
- Longitude of ascending node: 323.27°
- Argument of periapsis: 46.708°
- Mean anomaly: 0.011°
- Last perihelion: 1 March 2021
- Next perihelion: ~2970s
- T_{Jupiter}: –1.155
- Earth MOID: 0.117 AU
- Jupiter MOID: 0.023 AU

Physical characteristics
- Mean radius: 2.01 km (1.25 mi)
- Comet total magnitude (M1): 12.8
- Comet nuclear magnitude (M2): 15.6

C/2020 R4 (ATLAS) is a long-period comet with a roughly 950-year orbit around the Sun. It is one of many comets discovered by the Asteroid Terrestrial-impact Last Alert System (ATLAS).

== Observational history ==
On 12 September 2020, James E. Robinson reported the discovery of the comet taken by the ATLAS facility of the Mauna Loa Observatory in Hawaii, where he noted that a coma about 10 arcseconds wide was present at the time. Precovery images as early as 29 August were later found. Initially, it was predicted to become only a faint comet, until an unexpected outburst in December 2020 had increased its brightness by a hundred-fold, from magnitude 18 to 13.

The comet reached perihelion on 1 March 2021. By 13 March, it was an 8th-magnitude object within the constellation Aquila.

During its outbound flight, three outbursts were recorded between 20 April and 6 May 2021, with the first event being the strongest of the outbursts observed. Spectral and morphological analysis taken shortly after the first outburst on 22 April revealed that its nucleus had one active area producing jets of material asymmetrically to its inner coma. Its closest approach to Earth occurred on the next day, at a distance of 0.464 AU (69.4 million km).
