= C/1937 P1 (Hubble) =

Long-period comet

Discovery
- Discovered by: Edwin P. Hubble
- Discovery site: Mount Wilson Observatory
- Discovery date: 4 August 1937

Designations
- Alternative designations: 1936 V, 1937g

Orbital characteristics
- Epoch: 8 November 1936 (JD 2428480.5)
- Observation arc: 85 days
- Number of observations: 58
- Aphelion: ~140 AU
- Perihelion: 1.954 AU
- Semi-major axis: 71.039 AU
- Eccentricity: 0.97249
- Orbital period: ~600 years
- Inclination: 11.581°
- Longitude of ascending node: 97.796°
- Argument of periapsis: 147.49°
- Mean anomaly: –0.010°
- Last perihelion: 14 November 1936
- Next perihelion: ~2530s
- T_{Jupiter}: 1.759

Physical characteristics
- Apparent magnitude: 13.5 (1937 apparition)

Comet Hubble, formally designated C/1937 P1, is a long-period comet with a roughly 600-year orbit around the Sun. It is the first and only comet discovered by astronomer Edwin Hubble.

== Observational history ==
The comet was already on its outbound flight when it was first spotted in August 1937 as a magnitude 13.5 object in the constellation Aquarius. (Note: Reported initial position upon discovery was: α = 22^{h} 49.3^{m} , δ = –21° 00′) Initially, the comet was reported to be diffuse without a central condensation or nucleus. It is the fourth comet discovered in 1937.

Follow-up observations were noticeably difficult due to its apparent close proximity to the Sun and low altitude over the horizon. Despite being faint in the entirety of its visibility, numerous observations were conducted at the Union Observatory in Johannesburg, South Africa. By 7 September 1937, the comet continued to fade at apparent magnitude 14.5 as reported from the Crossley telescope. C/1937 P1 was last seen on 28 October 1937.

== Orbit ==
The first orbital calculations were made by L. E. Cunningham and A. D. Maxwell on 9 August 1937, and the comet was later known to have an elliptical orbit by 1938. At one point, it was briefly considered to be the same object as 9P/Tempel, which at the time was considered lost. Further calculations in 1952 showed that the comet came to perihelion on 14 November 1936, about nine months prior to discovery, and has a long-periodic orbit of about 600 years.
