= C/2023 H2 (Lemmon) =

Non-periodic comet

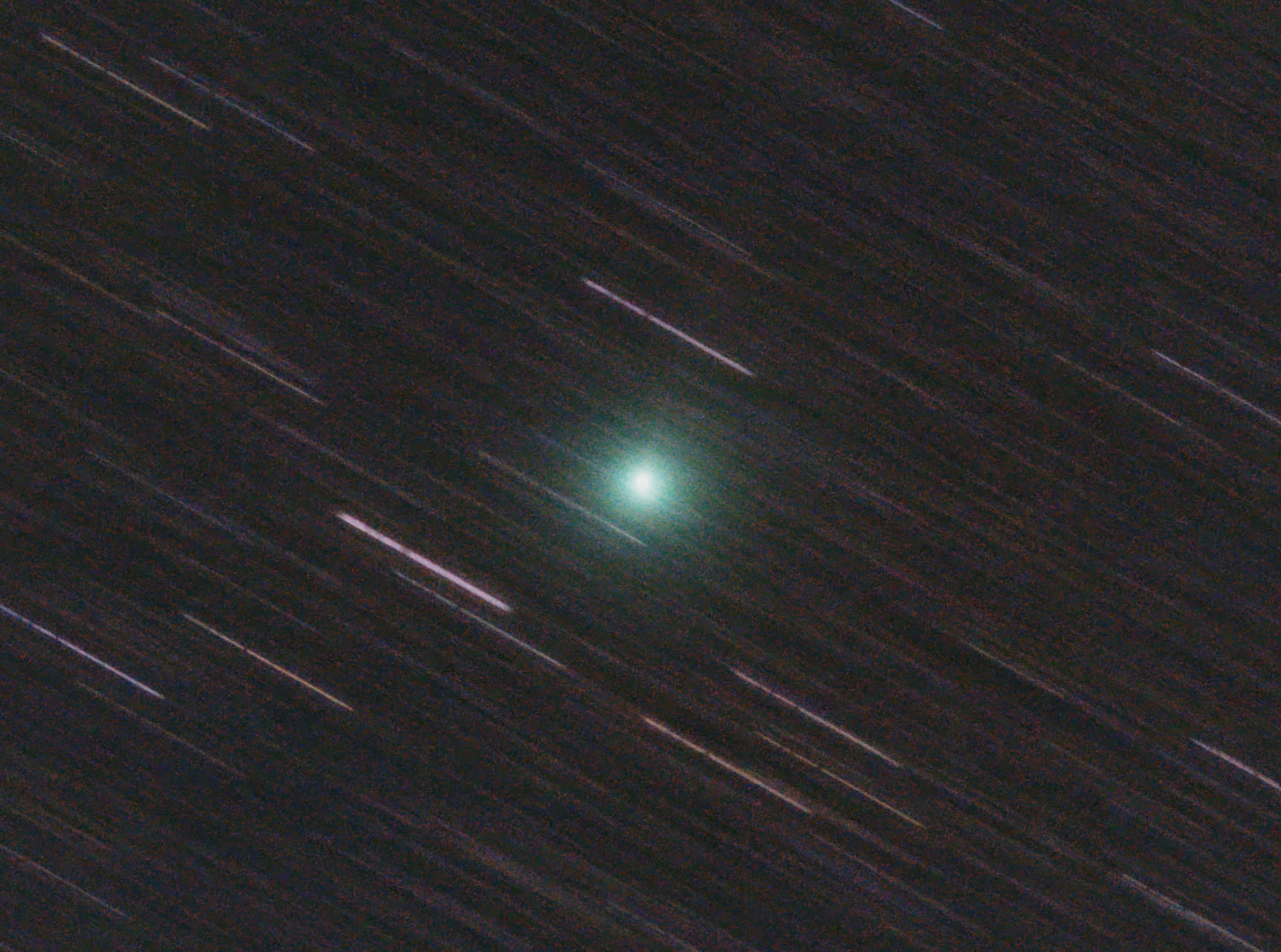
- The comet on 13 November 2023

Discovery
- Discovered by: Mount Lemmon Survey
- Discovery date: 23 April 2023

Designations
- Alternative designations: CK23H020

Orbital characteristics
- Epoch: 7 October 2023 (JD 2460224.5)
- Observation arc: 292 days
- Earliest precovery date: 26 March 2023
- Number of observations: 724
- Aphelion: 480.2 AU
- Perihelion: 0.894 AU
- Semi-major axis: 240.6 AU
- Eccentricity: 0.9963
- Orbital period: 3,731 years
- Inclination: 113.75°
- Longitude of ascending node: 217.04°
- Argument of periapsis: 150.65°
- Last perihelion: 29 October 2023
- T_{Jupiter}: –0.450
- Earth MOID: 0.036 AU
- Jupiter MOID: 1.411 AU

Physical characteristics
- Comet total magnitude (M1): 16.1
- Apparent magnitude: 6.0 (2023 apparition)

C/2023 H2 (Lemmon) is a non-periodic comet discovered by the Mount Lemmon Survey in images obtained on 23 April 2023. It passed perihelion on 29 October 2023 and on 10 November 2023 approached Earth to a distance of 0.19 AU (28 million km) brightening to an apparent magnitude of 6.

== Discovery and observations ==
The comet was discovered as an asteroidal object with an apparent magnitude of about 21 by the Mount Lemmon Survey in images obtained on 23 April 2023. Consequently, precovery images by PanSTARRS dating from 26 March 2023. Cometary activity was observed on 14 May, when the comet had a coma about 12 arcseconds across. The comet reached perihelion on 29 October 2023 and on 10 November 2023 approached Earth to a distance of 0.19 AU (28 million km). On that day the comet moved nine degrees across the sky. The comet brightened far above the expectations up to an apparent magnitude of 6, showing also a weak ion tail.

== Physical characteristics ==
The close encounter with Earth provided the rare opportunity to measure the composition of an otherwise faint comet. The water production rate was estimated to be (59±7)×10^{26} mol/s, which is unusually low compared to that measured in other Oort Cloud comets at similar heliocentric distances. The comet had also low production rate for hydroxyl radical and low dust signal. However, C/2023 H2 displays very high mixing ratio with respect to water of carbon monoxide (16.3±0.6%), as well as high abundances of ethane, methane, hydrogen cyanide, and methanol. The hyper-volatile species CO, C_{2}H_{6}, and CH_{4} probably play an important role in the activity of this comet.

== See also ==
- C/1975 T2 (Suzuki–Saigusa–Mori) - a comet with similar orbit
