= C/1853 G1 (Schweizer) =

Long period comet

Discovery
- Discovered by: Kaspar Gottfried Schweizer
- Discovery date: 5 April 1853

Designations
- Alternative designations: 1853 II

Orbital characteristics
- Epoch: 27 May 1853 (JD 2398000.5)
- Observation arc: 57 days
- Number of observations: 80
- Aphelion: 169 AU
- Perihelion: 0.909 AU
- Semi-major axis: 85 AU
- Eccentricity: 0.9893
- Orbital period: 781 years
- Inclination: 122.20°
- Longitude of ascending node: 43.02°
- Argument of periapsis: 199.23°
- Last perihelion: 10 May 1853
- T_{Jupiter}: -0.567

Physical characteristics
- Comet total magnitude (M1): 6
- Apparent magnitude: 1 (1853 apparition)

C/1853 G1 (Schweizer) is a long period comet discovered by Kaspar Gottfried Schweizer on 5 April 1853. The comet has an orbital period of about 780 years and has been associated with two weak meteor showers.

== Observational history ==
Kaspar Gottfried Schweizer found the comet near rho Aquilae while observing from Moscow and described it as small and round, about 3 arcminutes across, with no tail. The comet then was moving towards Earth and thus was moving slowly in the sky. The closest approach to Earth took place on 29 April, at a distance of 0.084 AU. That day the comet moved 24 degrees in the sky.

After that it appeared in the southern hemisphere. Its tail was reported to be up to 10 degrees long and the nucleus was as bright as a third or fourth magnitude star. On May 1 the comet was reported to be of first magnitude. The comet faded rapidly and by May it was no longer visible with naked eye. Perihelion took place on 10 May. The comet was last detected on 11 June 1853.

== Meteors ==
The minimum orbital intersection distance of the comet with Earth is 0.07 AU. The comet has been associated with the weak γ Aquilids meteor shower, which peaks on 4 May. A second meteor shower associated with the comet is the 52 Herculids. That shower could be the same as the R Lyrids.
