= 153P/Ikeya–Zhang =

Long-period comet

153P/Ikeya-Zhang
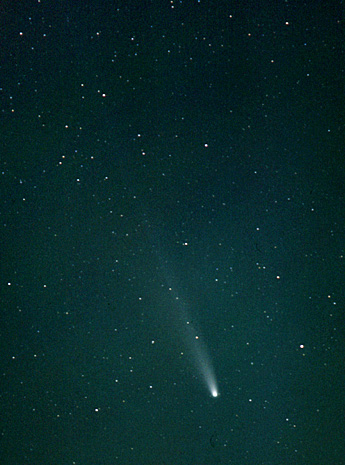
- Comet Ikeya–Zhang photographed by Philipp Salzgeber on 1 April 2002

Discovery
- Discovered by: Kaoru Ikeya; Zhang Daqing
- Discovery date: 1 February 2002

Designations
- MPC designation: X/877 L1; X/1273 G1; C/1661 C1; C/2002 C1

Orbital characteristics
- Epoch: 8 May 2002 (JD 2452402.5)
- Observation arc: 341–1,125 years
- Earliest precovery date: February 877; 3 February 1661
- Number of observations: 1,893
- Aphelion: 101.73 AU
- Perihelion: 0.507 AU
- Semi-major axis: 51.119 AU
- Eccentricity: 0.99008
- Orbital period: 365.49 years
- Max. orbital speed: 59 km/s (2002-03-18)
- Min. orbital speed: 0.29 km/s (Note: v = 42.1219 √1/r − 0.5/a, where r is the distance from the Sun, and a is the major semi-axis.) (2182-Nov-24)
- Inclination: 28.121°
- Longitude of ascending node: 93.369°
- Argument of periapsis: 34.668°
- Mean anomaly: 0.135°
- Last perihelion: 18 March 2002; 29 January 1661
- Next perihelion: 1 September 2362; 14 March 2363
- T_{Jupiter}: 0.879
- Earth MOID: 0.332 AU
- Jupiter MOID: 0.011 AU

Physical characteristics
- Mean diameter: 5.09 km (3.16 mi)
- Synodic rotation period: 1.48±0.2 days
- Geometric albedo: 0.3
- Comet total magnitude (M1): 4.0
- Apparent magnitude: 2.9 (2002 apparition)

Comet Ikeya–Zhang (Japanese, Chinese: 池谷-張彗星, officially designated 153P/Ikeya–Zhang) is a long-period comet discovered independently by two astronomers from Japan and China in 2002. It has by far the longest orbital period of the numbered periodic comets. It was last observed in October 2002 when it was about 3.3 AU (490 million km) from the Sun.

== Discovery and observations ==
On 1 February 2002, Chinese astronomer Zhang Daqing from Kaifeng discovered a new comet in the constellation Cetus, and reported it to the IAU. He found that Japanese astronomer Kaoru Ikeya had discovered it earlier than he had, as the time of sunset is earlier than China. According to tradition, since they discovered the new comet independently, the comet was named after both of them. The comet was initially designated as C/2002 C1 (Ikeya–Zhang).

The comet was observed in 1661, 341 years earlier, by Polish astronomer Johannes Hevelius. A bright comet had also been recorded by Chinese astronomers in 1661. Further research by Ichiro Hasegawa and Shuichi Nakano concluded that historical comets recorded in AD 877 and 1273 were likely previous apparitions of Ikeya–Zhang as well.

The permanent designation "153P" was given to the comet. It has the longest known orbital period of any periodic comet (366.51 years). Its orbital speed around the Sun varies from 59 km/s (37 mi/s) at perihelion to 0.29 km/s (0.18 mi/s) at aphelion.

The comet passed perihelion on 18 March 2002, and with apparent magnitude 2.9. With a multi-hundred year orbit involving asymmetric outgassing, the next perihelion passage is expected between 2362–2363. During March–April 2002, protons from the comet tail may have been detected by the Cassini–Huygens spacecraft. This data suggested the comet tail had a length greater than 7.5 AU (1.12 billion km), making it the longest yet detected.

== Orbit ==
The orbits of three periodic comets, Halley, Borrelly and Ikeya–Zhang, set against the orbits of the outer planets. Ikeya–Zhang is to the right.

== See also ==
- Johannes Hevelius
- List of Solar System objects by greatest aphelion

== Bibliography ==
- Kronk, Gary W.; Meyer, Maik; Seargent, David A. J. (1999). Cometography: A Catalog of Comets. Vol. 1: Ancient–1799. Cambridge University Press. ISBN 978-0-521-58504-0.

Numbered comets
Previous; 152P/Helin–Lawrence	153P/Ikeya–Zhang	Next; 154P/Brewington
