= C/1967 Y1 (Ikeya–Seki) =

Non-periodic comet

Discovery
- Discovered by: Kaoru Ikeya; Tsutomu Seki
- Discovery site: Japan
- Discovery date: 28 December 1967

Designations
- Alternative designations: 1968 I, 1967n

Orbital characteristics
- Epoch: 18 March 1968 (JD 2439933.5)
- Observation arc: 676 days (1.85 years)
- Number of observations: 300
- Aphelion: 4,020 AU
- Perihelion: 1.697 AU
- Semi-major axis: 2,011 AU
- Eccentricity: 0.99916
- Orbital period: 90,185 years
- Inclination: 129.315°
- Longitude of ascending node: 255.321°
- Argument of periapsis: 70.864°
- Last perihelion: 25 February 1968
- T_{Jupiter}: –1.02
- Earth MOID: 1.0675 AU
- Jupiter MOID: 0.0276 AU

Physical characteristics
- Comet total magnitude (M1): 4.0
- Apparent magnitude: 6.3 (1968 apparition)

Comet Ikeya-Seki, formally designated as C/1967 Y1, is a retrograde non-periodic comet discovered by Kaoru Ikeya and Tsutomu Seki on 1967. It is the second comet discovered by the two Japanese astronomers after C/1965 S1.

== Discovery and observations ==
C/1967 Y1 was the 14th comet discovered in 1967 when both Kaoru Ikeya and Tsutomu Seki spotted on the evening of 28 December. At the time, it was a 9th-magnitude object within the constellation Ophiuchus. (Note: Reported initial position upon discovery was: α = 16^{h} 32^{m} , δ = –2° 36′) The comet's position remained circumpolar throughout its last perihelion, thus giving astronomers a rare opportunity to observe it all night long.

It reached its peak brightness of 6.3 on 4 February. By 25 February 1968, the comet faded to an apparent magnitude of 7.1 and developed a very faint tail. Photometric spectroscopy of the comet's tail together with comets C/1968 L1 and C/1968 N1 has shown its forward scattering to be gray in the 3500–6300 Å spectrum, in contrast to the reddening of the dust tail seen in other comets. The comet was last observed from the Kitt Peak Observatory on 4 November 1969.
