= C/1992 W1 (Ohshita) =

Long-period comet

Discovery
- Discovered by: Nobuo Ohshita
- Discovery site: Furukawa, Gifu, Japan
- Discovery date: 24 November 1992

Designations
- Alternative designations: 1992 XXVII, 1992a1

Orbital characteristics
- Epoch: 18 December 1992 (JD 2448974.5)
- Observation arc: 79 days
- Earliest precovery date: 21 November 1992
- Number of observations: 85
- Aphelion: ~190 AU
- Perihelion: 0.665 AU
- Semi-major axis: 95.147 AU
- Eccentricity: 0.99301
- Orbital period: ~930 years
- Inclination: 115.14°
- Longitude of ascending node: 138.40°
- Argument of periapsis: 310.17°
- Mean anomaly: 0.049°
- Last perihelion: 11 November 1992
- Next perihelion: ~2920s
- T_{Jupiter}: –0.374
- Earth MOID: 0.161 AU
- Jupiter MOID: 0.643 AU

Physical characteristics
- Comet total magnitude (M1): 12.3
- Apparent magnitude: 10.6 (1992 apparition)

C/1992 W1 (Ohshita), is a long-period comet with a 930-year orbit around the Sun. It is the only comet discovered by Japanese astronomer, Nobuo Ohshita.

== Observational history ==
Nobuo Ohshita discovered this comet using a pair of 25×150 binoculars on the night of 24 November 1992. At the time, it was an 11th-magnitude object within the constellation Coma Berenices, (Note: Reported initial position upon discovery was: α = 13^{h} 05.3^{m} , δ = –5° 46′) however his discovery was not confirmed until he photographed the comet on three subsequent nights between 28 and 30 November 1992. Precovery images of the comet were taken by S. Horiguchi about three days earlier on 21 November 1992, which was reported to the International Astronomical Union (IAU) nearly a month later.

== Meteor shower ==
Orbital reconstructions in 2020 revealed that C/1992 W1 (Ohshita) is the parent body of at least one meteor shower group, the χ-Andromedids. In addition, another meteor shower group known as the January α-Ursae Majorids have similar orbital properties as the χ-Andromedids, suggesting that these may also originate from Comet Ohshita as well.

== Orbit ==
Comet Ohshita reached perihelion on 1 November 1992 at a distance of 0.668 AU (99.9 million km), indicating that it was already on its outbound trajectory when it was discovered nearly 23 days later. The comet made its closest approach to Earth on 23 December 1992 at a distance of 0.8181 AU (122.39 million km).

Both Brian G. Marsden and Shuichi Nakano calculated that the comet has a retrograde elliptical orbit lasting nearly 684 to 737 years around the Sun, later revised to approximately 928 years. All calculations have taken planetary perturbations into account.
