= C/1912 R1 (Gale) =

Non-periodic comet

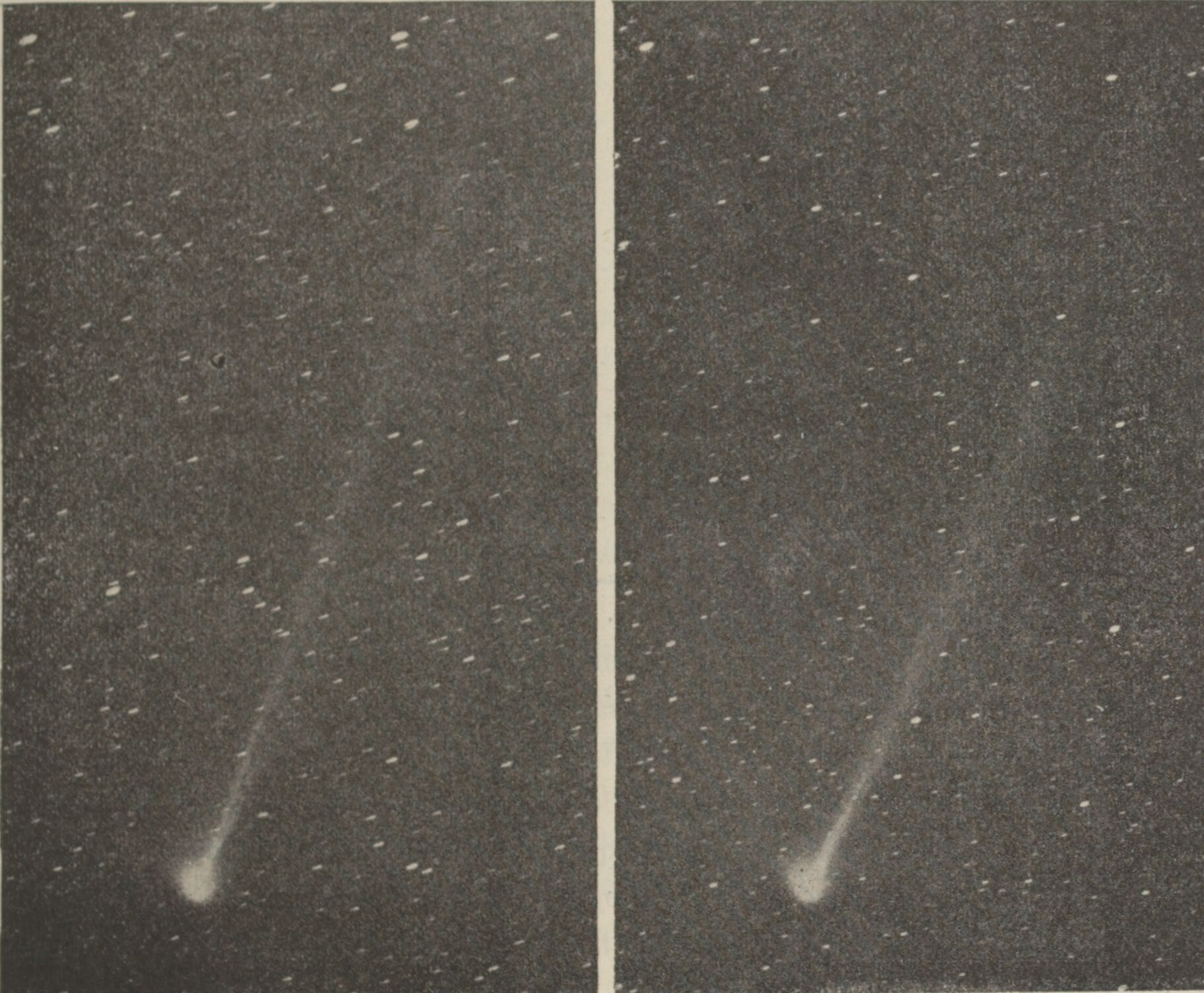
- Gale's Comet photographed by Ferdinand Quénisset on 14–16 October 1912.

Discovery
- Discovered by: Walter Frederick Gale
- Discovery site: Sydney, Australia
- Discovery date: 9 September 1912

Designations
- Alternative designations: 1912 II, 1912a

Orbital characteristics
- Epoch: 19 November 1912 (JD 2419725.5)
- Observation arc: 207 days
- Number of observations: 30
- Perihelion: 0.716 AU
- Eccentricity: 1.00045
- Orbital period: 3.3 million years (inbound)
- Inclination: 79.810°
- Longitude of ascending node: 298.25°
- Argument of periapsis: 25.623°
- Mean anomaly: 0.0007°
- Last perihelion: 5 October 1912
- Earth MOID: 0.257 AU
- Jupiter MOID: 1.523 AU

Physical characteristics
- Comet total magnitude (M1): 6.1
- Apparent magnitude: 4.0 (1912 apparition)

C/1912 R1 (Gale) is a non-periodic comet that was observed between September 1912 and May 1913. It is the second of three comets discovered by Australian astronomer, Walter Frederick Gale.
