= C/1894 G1 (Gale) =

Long-period comet

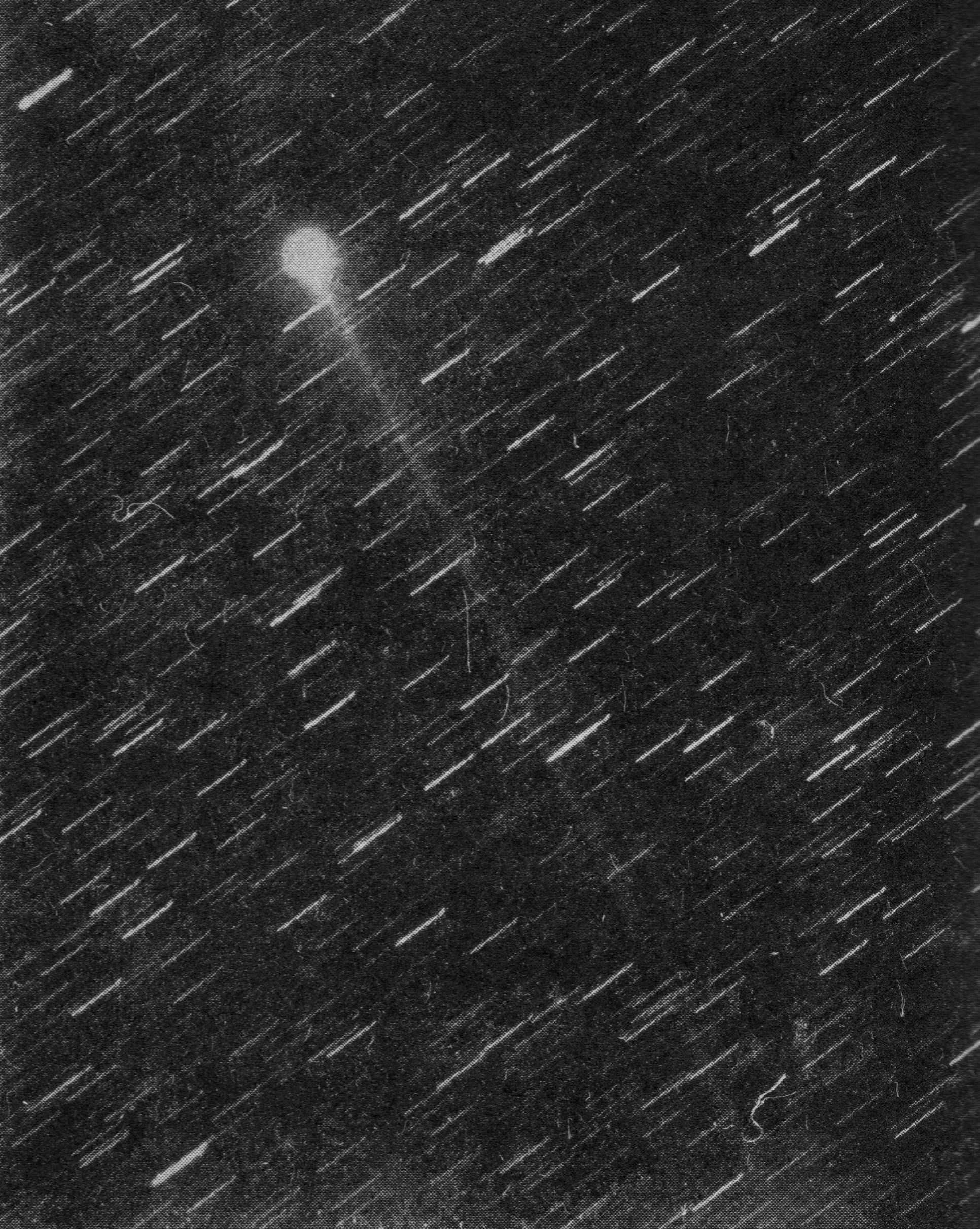
- Comet Gale (1894 II) photographed by Edward E. Barnard from the Lick Observatory on 5 May 1894

Discovery
- Discovered by: Walter F. Gale
- Discovery site: Sydney, Australia
- Discovery date: 1 April 1894

Designations
- Alternative designations: 1894 II, 1894b

Orbital characteristics
- Epoch: 4 June 1894 (JD 2412983.5)
- Observation arc: 82 days
- Number of observations: 45
- Aphelion: 176.85 AU
- Perihelion: 0.983 AU
- Semi-major axis: 88.914 AU
- Eccentricity: 0.98298
- Orbital period: 838.42 years
- Inclination: 86.959°
- Longitude of ascending node: 207.89°
- Argument of periapsis: 324.17°
- Mean anomaly: 0.060°
- Last perihelion: 13 April 1894
- T_{Jupiter}: 0.124
- Earth MOID: 0.076 AU
- Jupiter MOID: 1.230 AU

Physical characteristics
- Comet nuclear magnitude (M2): 6.3
- Apparent magnitude: 3.0 (1894 apparition)

C/1894 G1 (Gale), also known formerly as 1894 II, is a long-period comet that became barely visible to the naked eye in May 1894. It is the first of three comets discovered by Australian astronomer Walter Frederick Gale.

== Possible meteor shower ==
The comet's small minimum orbit intersection distance with Earth (0.076 AU) led scientists in 2021 to suggest that C/1894 G1 might potentially be the progenitor of a meteor shower known as the December Iota Ursae Majorids, however no definite link has yet been found between that particular shower and the comet.
