= C/2011 KP36 (Spacewatch) =

Long-period comet

C/2011 KP_{36} (Spacewatch)
Discovery
- Discovered by: Spacewatch; Terrence H. Bressi
- Discovery site: Kitt Peak Observatory
- Discovery date: 21 May 2011

Designations
- Alternative designations: CK11K36P

Orbital characteristics
- Epoch: 22 June 2016 (JD 2457561.5)
- Observation arc: 8.83 years
- Number of observations: 3,711
- Aphelion: 71.939 AU
- Perihelion: 4.883 AU
- Semi-major axis: 38.411 AU
- Eccentricity: 0.87287
- Orbital period: 238.07 years
- Inclination: 18.987°
- Longitude of ascending node: 173.40°
- Argument of periapsis: 180.59°
- Mean anomaly: 0.108°
- Last perihelion: 26 May 2016
- Next perihelion: 5 June 2254
- T_{Jupiter}: 2.643
- Earth MOID: 3.879 AU
- Jupiter MOID: 0.079 AU

Physical characteristics
- Mean diameter: 55.1 km (34.2 mi)
- Geometric albedo: 0.101
- Spectral type: (B–R) = 1.9±0.3
- Comet total magnitude (M1): 7.5
- Comet nuclear magnitude (M2): 9.5

C/2011 KP_{36} (Spacewatch) is a distant long-period comet that completes an orbit once every 238 years around the Sun. With a nucleus diameter of 55.1 km (34.2 mi), it is one of the largest comets ever discovered.

== Observational history ==
It was initially thought to be an asteroid-like object with a very eccentric orbit at the time of its discovery on 21 May 2011. A series of stacked images obtained from observations taken between April and May 2012 showed signs of diffuse cometary activity, with a coma about 6 arcseconds in diameter and a faint tail about 9 arcseconds in length.

Observations in July 2015 from the Leoncito Astronomical Complex (CASLEO) in Argentina showed that the comet had a dust mass-loss rate of about 282.86 kg/s (623.6 lb/s) in average.

== Orbit ==
Orbital calculations of the comet showed that it has a very eccentric orbit whose perihelion is around 4.88 AU (730 million km) from the Sun and an aphelion of 71.94 AU (10.762 billion km), almost twice that of Neptune.

NASA / JPL considers this comet as part of the Jupiter-family of comets, however this is highly unlikely as it takes roughly 238 years to complete one full orbit around the Sun. Some astronomers even consider this comet a scattered disc object, however Dr. Yan R. Fernandez concluded that 2011 KP_{36} belongs to the “group of long-period comets that are nearly Halley-type” despite its Tisserand parameter being around 2.64.
