= C/1857 V1 (Donati–van Arsdale) =

Parabolic comet

Discovery
- Discovered by: Giovanni B. Donati; Robert van Arsdale
- Discovery date: 10 November 1857

Designations
- Alternative designations: 1857 VI

Orbital characteristics
- Epoch: 19 November 1857 (JD 2399638.0641)
- Observation arc: 39 days
- Number of observations: 69
- Perihelion: 1.009 AU
- Eccentricity: ~1.000
- Inclination: 142.156°
- Longitude of ascending node: 141.307°
- Argument of periapsis: 95.102°
- Last perihelion: 19 November 1857
- Comet total magnitude (M1): 9.9

Comet Donati–van Arsdale, formally designated as C/1857 V1, is a parabolic comet co-discovered by Giovanni Battista Donati and Robert van Arsdale a few hours apart on 10 November 1857. It was calculated to have a retrograde trajectory around the Sun.
