= Walter Frederick Gale =

Australian banker and astronomer

- Born: 27 November 1865; Paddington, Sydney, New South Wales
- Died: 1 June 1945 (aged 79); Waverley, New South Wales
- Occupations: banker, astronomer

Walter Frederick Gale (27 November 1865 – 1 June 1945) was an Australian banker. Gale was born in Paddington, Sydney, New South Wales. He had a strong interest in astronomy and built his first telescope in 1884.

He discovered a total of three comets, including the lost periodic comet 34D/Gale, C/1894 G1 and C/1912 R1. He also discovered five southern double stars with the prefix GLE, and several dark sky objects, including the planetary nebula, IC 5148 in Grus. In 1892, he described oases and canals on Mars. He was awarded the Jackson-Gwilt Medal of the Royal Astronomical Society in 1935 for "discoveries of comets and his work for astronomy in New South Wales."

A crater on Mars, Gale, was named in his honour. It was selected as the August 6, 2012, landing site for the Curiosity rover.
