= Spacewatch =

Astronomical survey that specializes in the study of minor planets

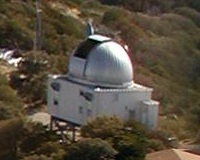
- Spacewatch 1.8-meter telescope
- Coordinates: 31°57′44″N 111°36′01″W
- Observatory code: 691
- Website: spacewatch.lpl.arizona.edu

Minor planets discovered: 169,873
see Category:Discoveries by the Spacewatch project

The Spacewatch Project is an astronomical survey that specializes in the study of minor planets, including various types of asteroids and comets at University of Arizona telescopes on Kitt Peak near Tucson, Arizona. The Spacewatch Project has been active longer than any other similar currently active programs.

Spacewatch was founded in 1980 by Tom Gehrels and Robert S. McMillan, and is currently led by astronomer Melissa Brucker at the University of Arizona. Spacewatch uses three telescopes of apertures 0.9-m, 1.8-m, and 2.3-m. These telescopes are located on Kitt Peak, with the first two dedicated to the purpose of locating Near-Earth Objects (NEOs).

The 36 inch (0.9 meter) telescope on Kitt Peak has been in use by Spacewatch since 1984, and since 2000 the 72 inch (1.8 meter) Spacewatch telescope. Spacewatch's 1.8-meter telescope is the largest in the world that is used exclusively for asteroids and comets. It can find asteroids and comets anywhere from the space near Earth to regions beyond the orbit of Neptune, and do astrometry on the fainter of objects that are already known. The telescope uses a CCD camera at folded prime focus.

The 0.9-meter telescope complements these deep observations using an array of four CCDs to cover a much larger field of view, 2.9 square degrees compared to the ~ 0.1 square degrees of the 1.8-meter.

Each year, Spacewatch observes approximately 35 radar targets, 50 near-Earth objects, and 100 potential spacecraft rendezvous destinations. From 2013 to 2016, Spacewatch observed half of all NEOs and potentially hazardous asteroids (PHAs) observed by anyone in that time. As of 2022, Spacewatch had discovered over 179,000 minor planets numbered by the Minor Planet Center.

== History ==
The 1.8 meter Spacewatch telescope and its building on Kitt Peak were dedicated on June 7, 1997 for the purpose of finding previously unknown asteroids and comets. Since January 1, 2003, Spacewatch has made ~2400 separate-night detections of Near-Earth Objects.

There was an upgrade to the 0.9 meter which was funded by NASA and the Kirsch Foundation.

The Spacewatch Project is the longest-running of all present programs of astrometry of solar system objects, and was the first to use CCDs to survey the sky for comets and asteroids.

== Spacewatch in action ==
Spacewatch conducted a survey that was proposed May 12, 2006, and accepted on November 13, 2006. This survey used data taken over 34 months by the University of Arizona’s Spacewatch Project based at Steward Observatory, Kitt Peak. Spacewatch revisited the same sky area every three to seven nights in order to track cohorts of main-belt asteroids. This survey discovered one new large Kuiper Belt Object (KBO) and detected six others. This proved that new sweeps of the sky are productive even if they have been previously examined simply due to the complexities of running large surveys over many nights and variable conditions.

== Notable discoveries ==
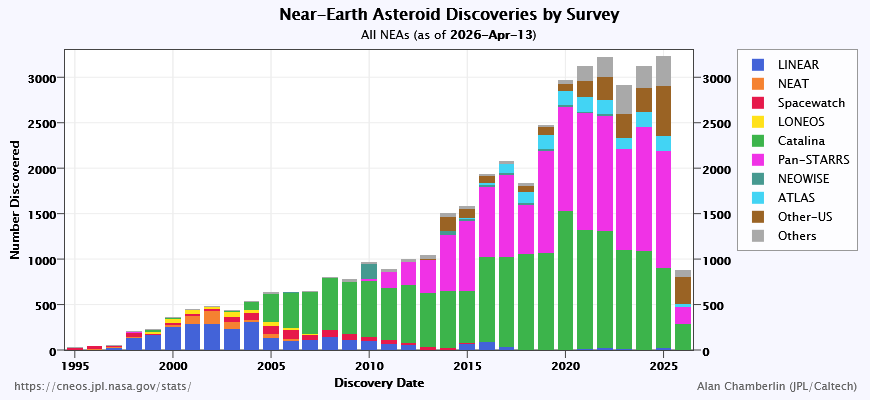
Number of NEOs detected by various projects: LINEAR; NEAT; Spacewatch; LONEOS / CSS; Pan-STARRS; NEOWISE; All others

- Callirrhoe
- 5145 Pholus
- 9965 GNU
- 9885 Linux
- 9882 Stallman
- 9793 Torvalds
- 20000 Varuna
- 60558 Echeclus
- 1998 KY26, target of JAXA's Hayabusa2 extended mission.
- 65803 Didymos, target of the DART mission
- (35396) 1997 XF11
- (48639) 1995 TL8
- (136617) 1994 CC
- C/1992 J1
- C/2011 KP_{36}
- 125P/Spacewatch
- 174567 Varda
- 2013 BS45
- The project rediscovered 719 Albert, a long-lost asteroid.

== See also ==
- Planetary Data System (PDS)
- Spaceguard
- List of near-Earth object observation projects
