= C/2012 J1 (Catalina) =

Parabolic comet

Discovery
- Discovered by: Catalina Sky Survey: Alex R. Gibbs
- Discovery site: Steward Observatory
- Discovery date: 14 May 2012

Orbital characteristics
- Epoch: 16 November 2012 (JD 2456247.5)
- Observation arc: 1.85 years
- Earliest precovery date: 13 May 2012
- Number of observations: 4,405
- Aphelion: ~8,300 AU (inbound)
- Perihelion: 3.159 AU
- Semi-major axis: ~4,150 AU (inbound)
- Eccentricity: 0.99924 (inbound); 1.00102 (outbound)
- Orbital period: ~268,000 years (inbound)
- Inclination: 34.186°
- Longitude of ascending node: 235.22°
- Argument of periapsis: 147.27°
- Last perihelion: 7 December 2012
- T_{Jupiter}: 1.824
- Earth MOID: 2.219 AU
- Jupiter MOID: 1.382 AU

Physical characteristics
- Mean radius: 3.3 km (2.1 mi)
- Mean density: 470±60 kg/m^{3}
- Geometric albedo: 0.04 (assumed)
- Comet total magnitude (M1): 7.2
- Comet nuclear magnitude (M2): 10.5

C/2012 J1 (Catalina) is a distant non-periodic comet that only came within 3.16 AU (473 million km) from the Sun during its perihelion in December 2012. It is one of several comets discovered by the Catalina Sky Survey.

== Physical characteristics ==
Observations conducted between March 2013 and May 2014 recorded three outburst events that brightened the comet between 0.2 and 2.99 magnitudes temporarily. Assuming a geometric albedo of 0.04, its nucleus is estimated to have an effective radius of around 3.3 km (2.1 mi). Spectroscopic and polarimetric analysis of the comet had determined a gas production rate of around 3.7×10^{23} molecules per second during perihelion.
