= C/1855 L1 (Donati) =

Long-period comet

Discovery
- Discovered by: Giovanni B. Donati
- Discovery site: Florence, Italy
- Discovery date: 3 June 1855

Designations
- Alternative designations: 1855 II

Orbital characteristics
- Epoch: 17 May 1855 (JD 2398720.5)
- Observation arc: 14 days
- Number of observations: 49
- Aphelion: 79.259 AU
- Perihelion: 0.5676 AU
- Semi-major axis: 39.913 AU
- Eccentricity: 0.98578
- Orbital period: 252 years
- Inclination: 156.871°
- Longitude of ascending node: 262.231°
- Argument of periapsis: 22.488°
- Last perihelion: 30 May 1855
- Next perihelion: ~2097
- T_{Jupiter}: –0.726

Physical characteristics
- Comet total magnitude (M1): 11.3
- Apparent magnitude: 8.0 (1855 apparition)

Comet Donati, formally designated as C/1855 L1, is a long-period comet that has an orbital period of approximately 252 years. It was the second comet discovered in 1855, and the first of five comets discovered by Italian astronomer, Giovanni Battista Donati.

== Discovery and observations ==
The comet was discovered by Giovanni Battista Donati on the night of 3 June 1855, describing the comet without a nucleus nor a tail, which was seemingly fainter than Messier 13. Independent observations were also made by Charles Dien, Jr. and Wilhelm Klinkerfues the following day.

The comet was already on its outbound flight upon discovery, where observers noted it had faded significantly by June 14. It was last observed from Germany on 30 June 1855.

== Orbit ==
The first orbital calculations by Karl Christian Bruhns and Donati initially yielded an orbital period lasting 493 years, where the latter had concluded its similarity with C/1362 E1 and may had indicated its possible return to the inner Solar System. However, in 1916, George van Biesbroeck later revised this to 252 years, with gravitational perturbations of Venus and Saturn being considered, and thus concluded that it is unlikely that the comets of 1362 and 1855 were the same object.
