= C/2013 UQ4 (Catalina) =

Long-period comet

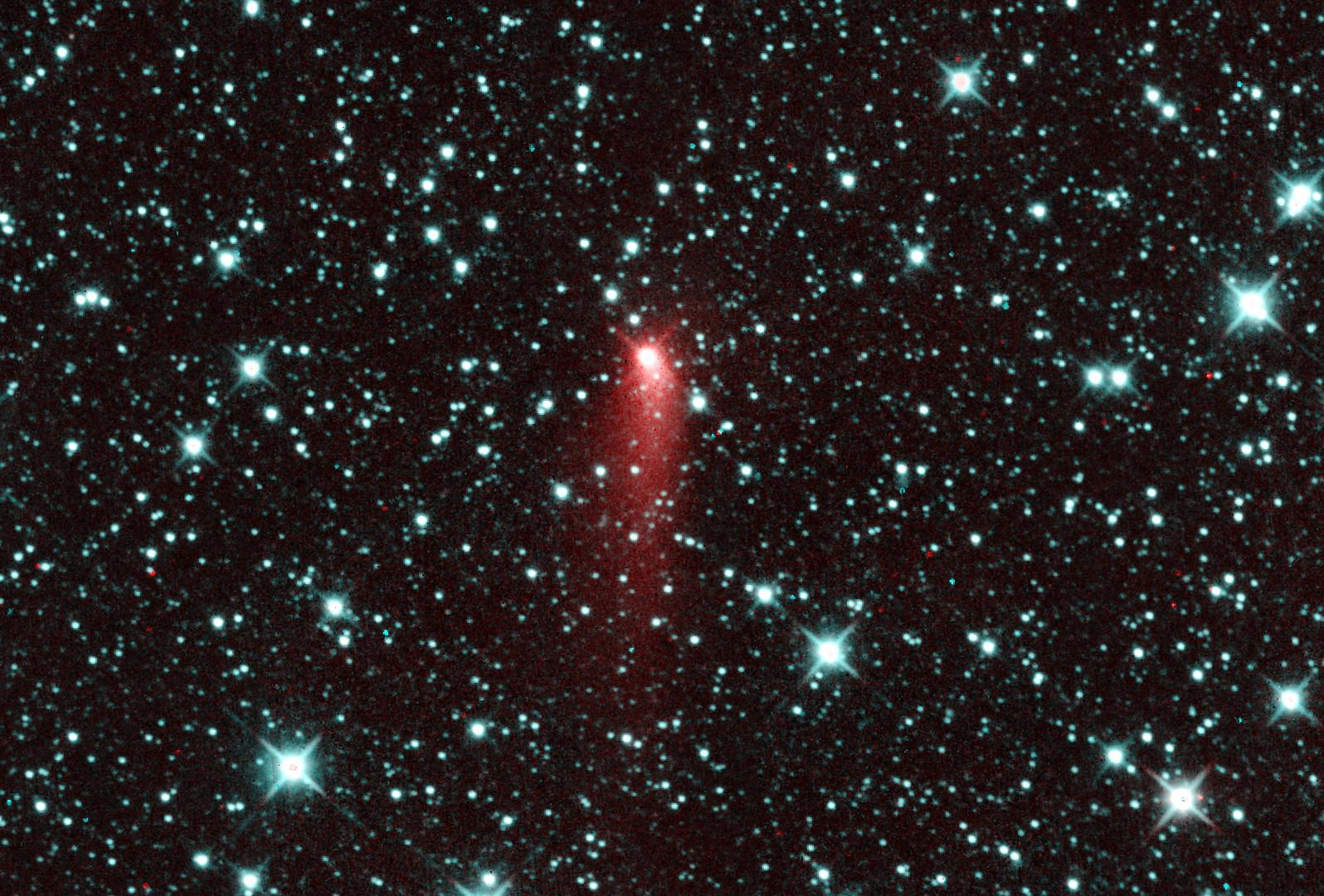
- C/2013 UQ4 in infrared by NEOWISE on 7 July 2014

Discovery
- Discovered by: Catalina Sky Survey
- Discovery date: 23 October 2013

Orbital characteristics
- Epoch: 12 July 2014
- Observation arc: 862 days
- Aphelion: 120.06 AU
- Perihelion: 1.081 AU
- Semi-major axis: 60.57 AU
- Eccentricity: 0.982
- Orbital period: 471 years
- Inclination: 145.26°
- Longitude of ascending node: 317.66°
- Argument of periapsis: 23.31°
- Last perihelion: 5 July 2014
- Earth MOID: 0.106 AU

Physical characteristics
- Mean diameter: 23.5 km
- Comet total magnitude (M1): 13.8
- Comet nuclear magnitude (M2): 17.5

C/2013 UQ_{4} (Catalina) is a Solar System comet that came close to the Earth on July 10, 2014, at a distance of 0.314 AU (47,000,000 km; 29,200,000 mi).

== Discovery and identification ==
The object was discovered on October 23, 2013, by Catalina Sky Survey, in Arizona in the United States, with an estimated apparent magnitude around 18.5. The object, that had an asteroid-like appearance but a comet-like orbit, was named 2013 UQ_{4}. On 26 April 2014 the object was spotted by astronomer Michael Mattiazzo to be slightly diffuse in two minute exposures obtained with a Canon EOS 5D Mark II and a 400mm f/2.8 lens. On May 7, 2014, astronomers A. Novichonok and T. Prystavski noticed too a fuzzy, coma-like aspect, revealing it was indeed a comet (with total brightness 13.5 mag and coma diameter of 1.5'). The object was then given a comet designation of C/2013 UQ_{4} (Catalina).

== Approach to Sun and Earth ==
The comet reached its perihelion (the point that is closest to the Sun) on June 5, 2014, and then its perigee (the point that is closest to Earth) on July 10, 2014, at a distance of about 47 million kilometres. The comet peaked around apparent magnitude 9 and was visible in small telescopes. The comet was also observed by the NEOWISE mission on 7 July 2014 in the infrared, and was noted that the comet had a tail measuring 100.000 kilometers in length. From late July 2014 until March 2015, as seen from Earth, the comet appeared near Arcturus.

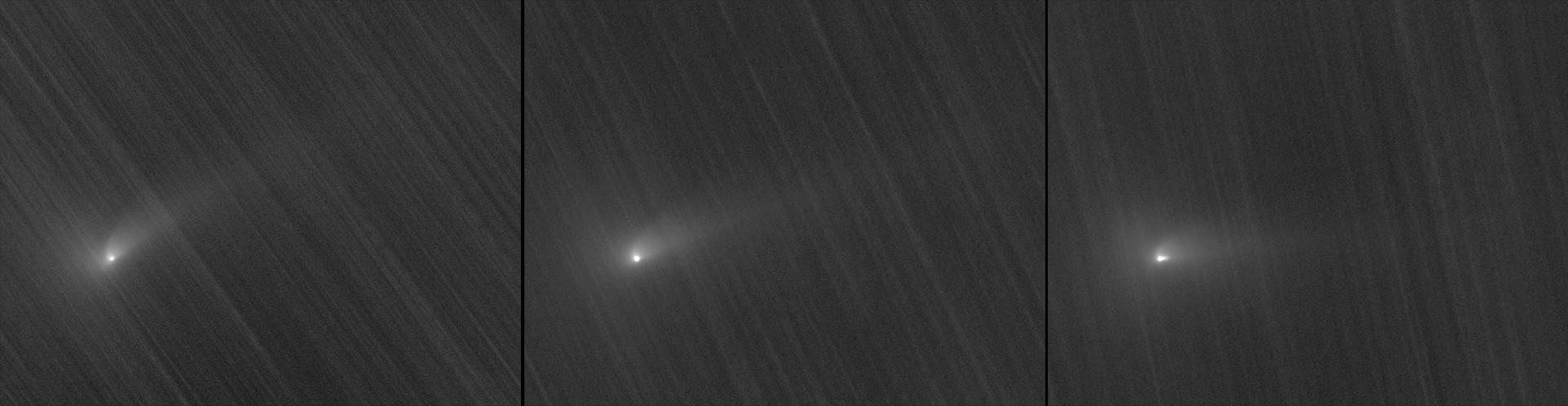
Comet C/2013 UQ_{4} (Catalina), images from July 9th, 10th and 11th 2014, showing the evolution of the shape of the comet with its relative position to Earth (i.e. perigee was on July 10th, at a distance of 47 million kilometres (29 million miles)
