= C/1963 A1 (Ikeya) =

Long-period comet

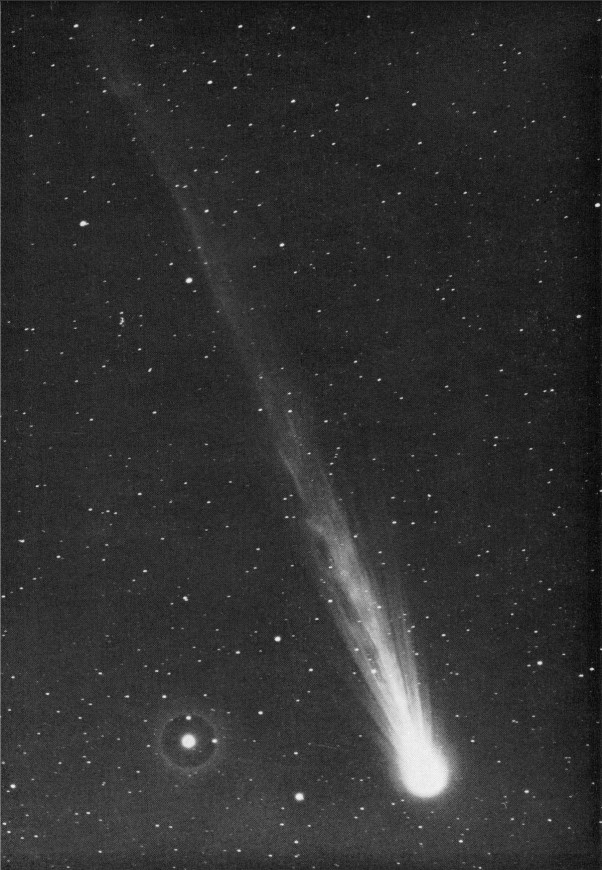
- Comet Ikeya next to α Piscium on 14 March 1963

Discovery
- Discovered by: Kaoru Ikeya
- Discovery site: Maisaka, Japan
- Discovery date: 2 January 1963

Designations
- Alternative designations: 1963 I, 1963a

Orbital characteristics
- Epoch: 26 April 1963 (JD 2438145.5)
- Observation arc: 278 days
- Number of observations: 33
- Aphelion: 190.5 AU
- Perihelion: 0.632 AU
- Semi-major axis: 95.55 AU
- Eccentricity: 0.99338
- Orbital period: ~934 years
- Inclination: 160.64°
- Longitude of ascending node: 53.22°
- Argument of periapsis: 336.30°
- Last perihelion: 21 March 1963
- Next perihelion: ~2890s
- T_{Jupiter}: –0.874
- Earth MOID: 0.2364 AU
- Jupiter MOID: 0.5942 AU

Physical characteristics
- Comet nuclear magnitude (M2): 15.0
- Apparent magnitude: 2.8 (1963 apparition)

C/1963 A1 (Ikeya) is a long period comet discovered by Kaoru Ikeya on 2 January 1963. The comet last passed perihelion on 21 March 1963, when it reached an apparent magnitude of 2.8.

== Observational history ==
The comet was discovered by the Japanese amateur astronomer Kaoru Ikeya on 2 January 1963. At that time Kaoru Ikeya was 19 years old and used a self-made 8-inch telescope. The comet was then located three degrees southwest of π Hydrae, (Note: Reported initial position upon discovery was: α = 13^{h} 53^{m} , δ = –27° 15′) had an estimated magnitude of 12 and was diffuse. He confirmed his finding the next day and telegraphed his discovery to the Tokyo Astronomical Observatory, and the new comet was photographed with the Brashear Astrograph.

The comet at discovery was moving rapidly southwards and after 25 January could not be observed from the northern hemisphere. The comet became circumpolar in the southern sky and between February 11 and February 13 was in the constellation of Octans, near the south celestial pole, and then moved northwards. The comet was brightening during February and 15 February was the day of the closest approach of the comet to Earth, at a distance of 0.327 AU (48.9 million km; 30.4 million mi). The comet grew a tail that photographically was estimated to be 8 degrees long on 18 February, while it reached third magnitude and was visible with naked eye. The tail originally had a simple straight form but its structure became more complex by the end of the month.

By March 1963 the comet again became visible in the northern hemisphere. By 10 March, the apparent magnitude of the comet was estimated to be 4.5. The length of the tail was reported to be as long as nearly 20 degrees on 21 March, the date of the perihelion. After perihelion the comet was in conjunction with the Sun and could not be observed. It reached its minimum elongation of 4° on 12 April.

The comet was recovered in mid-May in the morning sky and was brighter than expected, as the comet faded at a slower rate than it brightened, having a magnitude of 7 to 8. The brighter than expected comet led to some reports that this was a new comet, but photographic observations revealed that there was only one comet in the region, comet Ikeya. In long exposure photographs in mid-June the tail was more than half a degree long. The comet faded rapidly in September and October and was last observed on 12 October.

== Scientific results ==
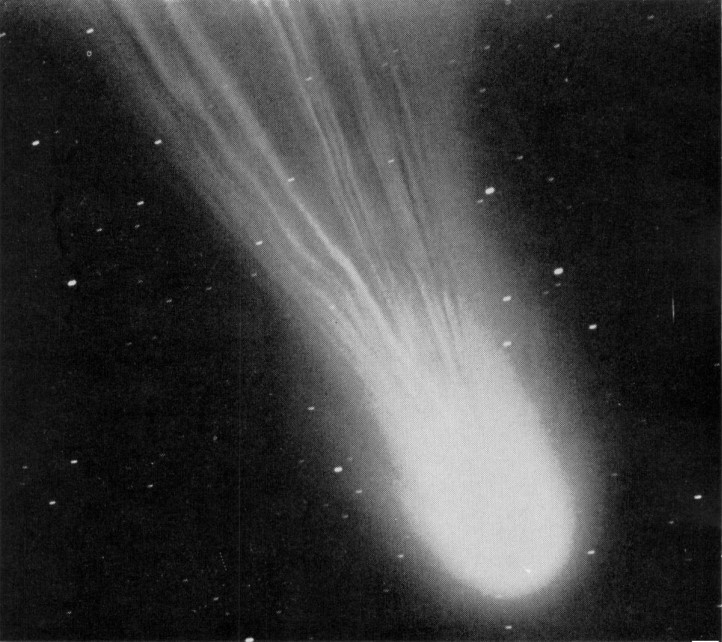
The head of the comet on 20 March 1963

On 5–6 March 1963, spectrograms of the comet were taken at the Palomar Observatory in California, showing the emission lines of CN, C_{2} and C_{3}. The ratio of the isotopes C_{12} and C_{13} were also determined from the intensities. The value was in a range comparable to that on Earth. Additional spectrum obtained from the Lick Observatory showed the presence of NH_{2} and also featured a strong line in λ 6200.

== Meteor showers ==
The comet is considered to be the parent body of a number of meteor showers, as it has been modeled to create five streams that intersect with the orbit of Earth. Two of these meteor showers have been identified as π-Hydrids and δ-Corvids. Also the meteor shower of α-Sextantids could also be associated with comet Ikeya. One more meteor shower visible in the data of the Cameras for Allsky Meteor Surveillance, named θ-Leonids is also a good match with the predicted meteor streams.
