= Kaspar Gottfried Schweizer =

Swiss astronomer

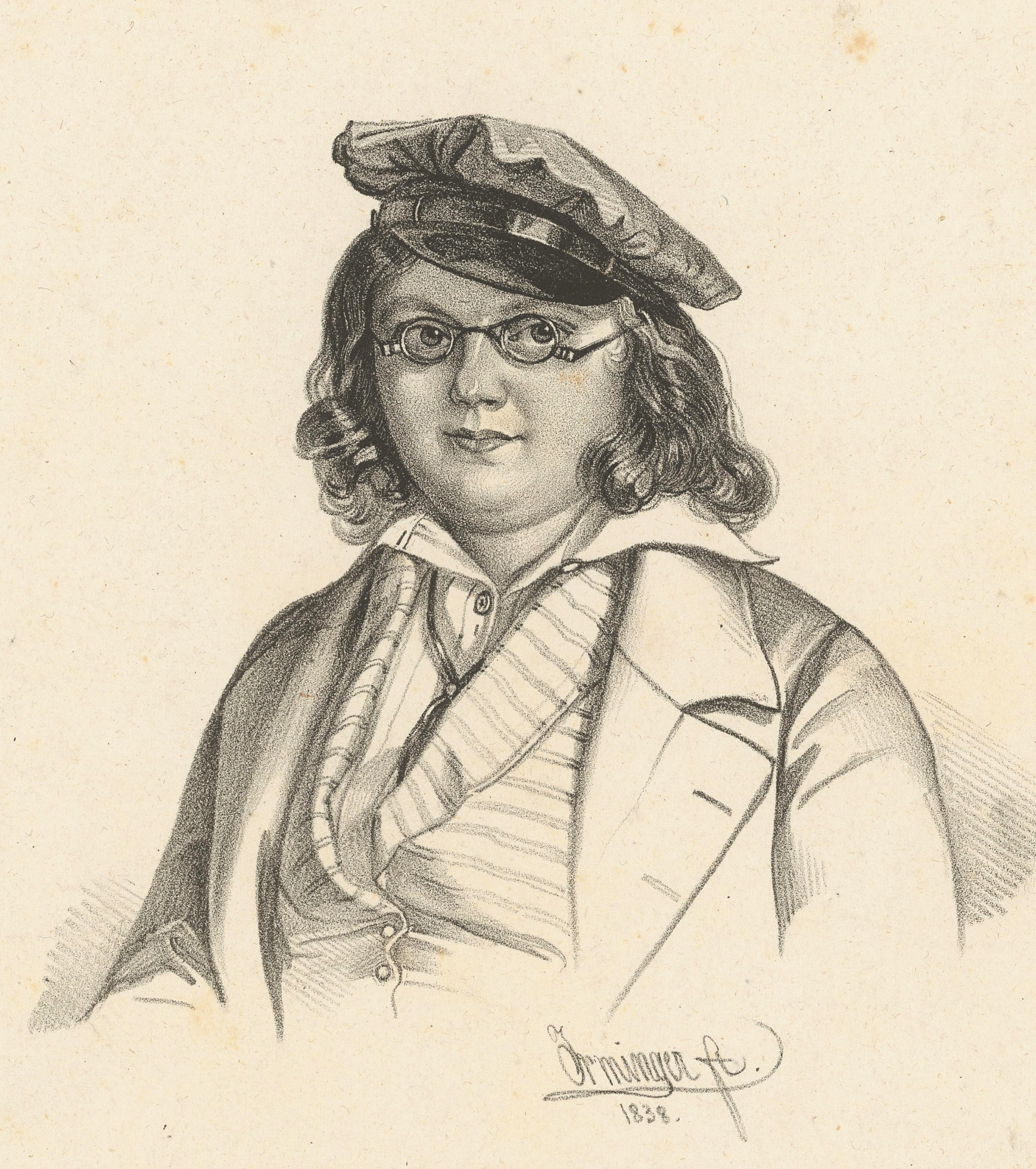
- Kaspar Schweizer in 1838
- Born: 16 February 1816; Wila, Switzerland
- Died: 6 July 1873 (aged 57)
- Occupation: Astronomer
- Known for: Discovering five comets, foundation of NGC 7804

Kaspar Gottfried Schweizer (16 February 1816 – 6 July 1873) was a Swiss astronomer who travelled to Moscow in 1845 to become Professor of Mathematics and Astronomy at the Survey Institute, and later director of the Moscow University Observatory.

Schweizer was born in 1816 as the son of a pastor at Wila, Switzerland. In 1839, he went to Königsberg to assist Friedrich Wilhelm Bessel. From 1841 to 1845 he worked at Pulkovo Observatory under Friedrich Georg Wilhelm von Struve. Schweizer discovered five comets, and found one NGC object, NGC 7804, on 11 November 1864.
