= C/1961 T1 (Seki) =

Long-period comet

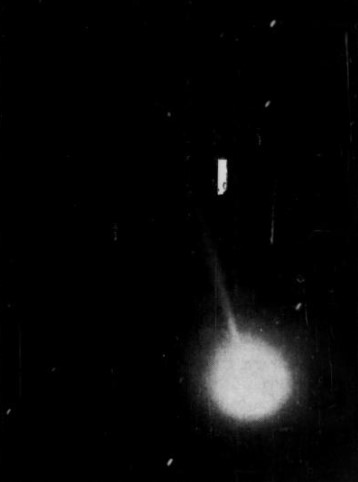
- Comet Seki photographed by Elizabeth Roemer on 18 October 1961

Discovery
- Discovered by: Tsutomu Seki
- Discovery date: 10 October 1961

Designations
- Alternative designations: 1961f 1961 VIII

Orbital characteristics
- Epoch: 12 November 1961 (JD 2437615.5)
- Observation arc: 75 days
- Number of observations: 15
- Aphelion: 173 AU
- Perihelion: 0.681 AU
- Semi-major axis: 86.8 AU
- Eccentricity: 0.9921
- Orbital period: ~810 years
- Inclination: 155.71°
- Longitude of ascending node: 247.36°
- Argument of periapsis: 126.59°
- Last perihelion: 10 October 1961
- T_{Jupiter}: -0.871
- Earth MOID: 0.084 AU
- Jupiter MOID: 0.490 AU

Physical characteristics
- Apparent magnitude: 4

C/1961 T1 (Seki) is a long-period comet discovered by Tsutomu Seki on 10 October 1961. The comet has been identified as the parent body of the December ρ-Virginids meteor shower.

== Observational history ==
The comet was discovered on 10 October 1961 by Tsutomu Seki from Kochi, Japan. He used a 9-cm refractor, which had a larger field of view than his previous reflector telescope, to sweep the southeastern sky before the start of twilight. He quickly spotted the comet 10 degrees above the horizon in the constellation of Leo and estimated its magnitude at 7–8. The comet was then at perihelion and at an elongation of 31 degrees.

The presence of the comet was confirmed by Minoru Honda on 11 October, and he described the comet as diffuse, with central concentration and a magnitude of 8. The comet reached its northernmost declination on 14 October, at 14° north. On that day the comet was reported by Ahnert to have a tail 4 degrees long, while George Alcock estimated the comet to have an apparent magnitude of 7. Elias and Phocas observed the comet from Athens Observatory and noted that the nucleus had split in three on 17 October and there were bright condensations around the nucleus on 19 October. On the 25 October Elizabeth Roemer estimated using binoculars, that the comet had an apparent magnitude of 6.5.

The comet brightened in November, as it approached Earth, and was moving rapidly southwards. The comet was first reported to be visible with the naked eye on 11 November, with brightness estimates between 4.5 and 5.5. The comet approached Earth to a distance of 0.102 AU on 15 November 1961. S. Archer from Rhodes University, South Africa, estimated that the comet peaked at an apparent magnitude of 4.3 and its coma was up to 40 arcminutes across. John Caister Bennett estimated the comet had an apparent magnitude of 4 on 13 and 15 November. The comet reached its southernmost declination of 16 November, at -69°. After that the comet faded quickly and on 4 December its magnitude was reported to be 8.4. It was last detected on 29 December 1961.

== Meteor showers ==
The comet approaches Earth to a distance of 0.08 AU and thus it was suggested from 1961 that is could be a source of meteors. Mathematical models indicate that the meteor stream of the comet evolved into two filaments. The shower associated with the first filament was identified as the December ρ-Virginids, while the other shower was identified as the γ-Sagittariids.
