= Comet Ikeya–Seki =

Great Comet of 1965

C/1965 S1 (Ikeya–Seki) (Great Comet of 1965)
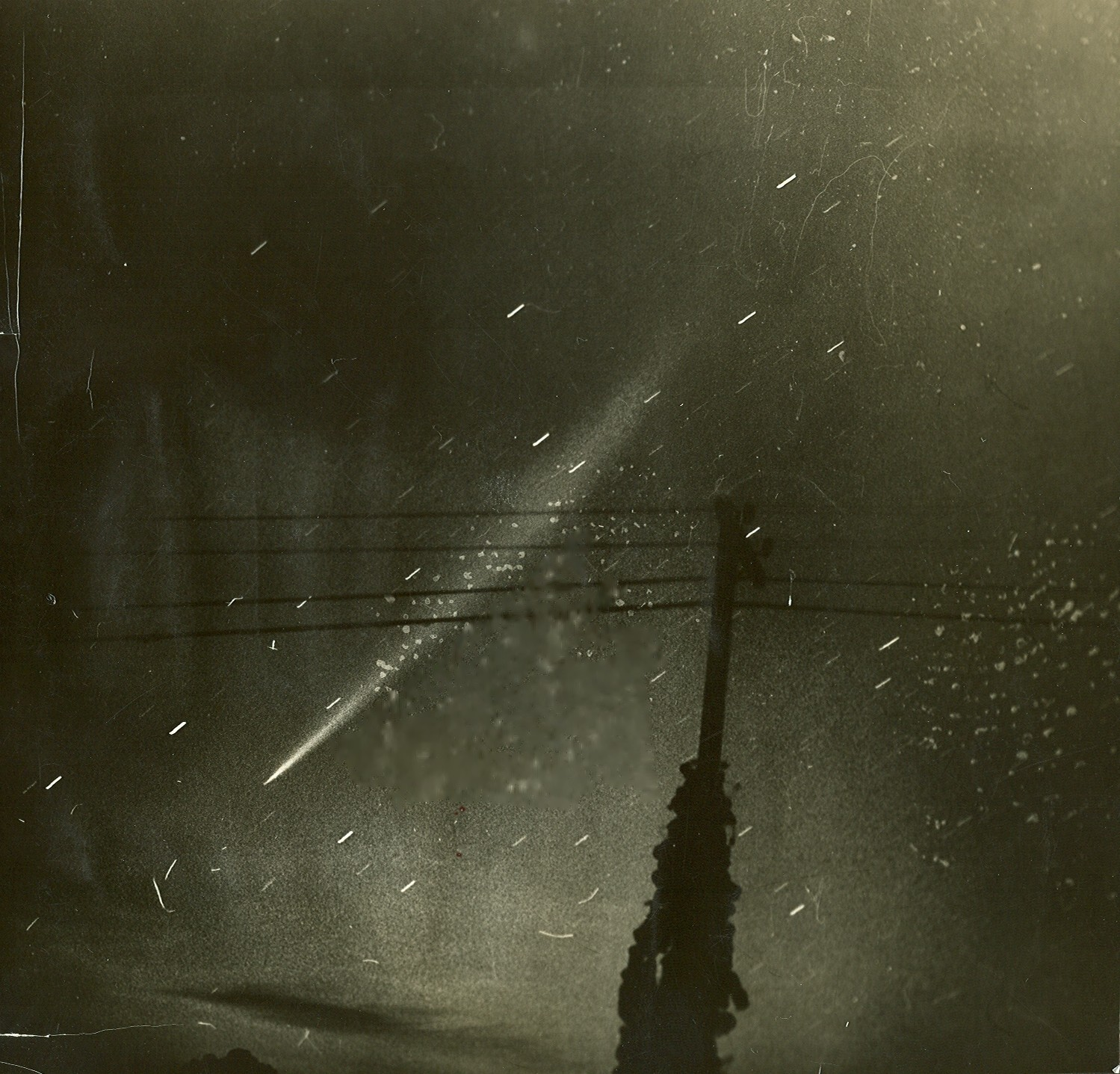
- Comet Ikeya–Seki photographed by Maynard Pittendreigh sometime in 1965

Discovery
- Discovered by: Kaoru Ikeya; Tsutomu Seki
- Discovery site: Japan
- Discovery date: 18 September 1965

Designations
- Alternative designations: 1965 VIII, 1965f

Orbital characteristics
- Epoch: 7 October 1965 (JD 2439040.5)
- Observation arc: 115 days
- Number of observations: 101–119
- Orbit type: Kreutz sungrazer (Population II)
- Aphelion: 183 AU (A); 207 AU (B)
- Perihelion: 0.007786 AU (A); 0.007778 AU (B)
- Semi-major axis: 91.6 AU (A); 103.7 AU (B)
- Eccentricity: 0.999915 (A); 0.999925 (B)
- Orbital period: 795 years (A); 946 years (B)
- Inclination: 141.864° (A); 141.861° (B)
- Longitude of ascending node: 346.995° (A); 346.981° (B)
- Argument of periapsis: 69.049° (A); 69.034° (B)
- Last perihelion: 21 October 1965

Physical characteristics
- Mean radius: 4.3 km (2.7 mi) (pre-perihelion)
- Mass: 1.20×10^{17} kg
- Mean density: 0.35 g/cm^{3} (assumed)
- Comet total magnitude (M1): 6.2
- Apparent magnitude: –10.0 (1965 apparition)

Comet Ikeya–Seki, formally designated C/1965 S1, 1965 VIII, and 1965f, was a long-period comet discovered independently by Kaoru Ikeya and Tsutomu Seki. First observed as a faint telescopic object on 18 September 1965, the first calculations of its orbit suggested that on October 21, it would pass just 450,000 km (280,000 mi) above the Sun's surface, and would probably become extremely bright.

Comets can defy such predictions, but Ikeya–Seki performed as expected. As it approached perihelion observers reported that it was clearly visible in the daytime sky next to the Sun. In Japan, where it reached perihelion at local noon, it was seen shining at magnitude −10. It proved to be one of the brightest comets seen in the last thousand years, and is sometimes known as the Great Comet of 1965.

The comet was seen to break into three pieces just before its perihelion passage. The three pieces continued in almost identical orbits, and the comet re-appeared in the morning sky in late October, showing a very bright tail. By early 1966, it had faded from view as it receded into the outer Solar System.

Ikeya–Seki is a member of the Kreutz sungrazers, which are suggested to be fragments of a large comet that had broken apart.

== Discovery and observations ==
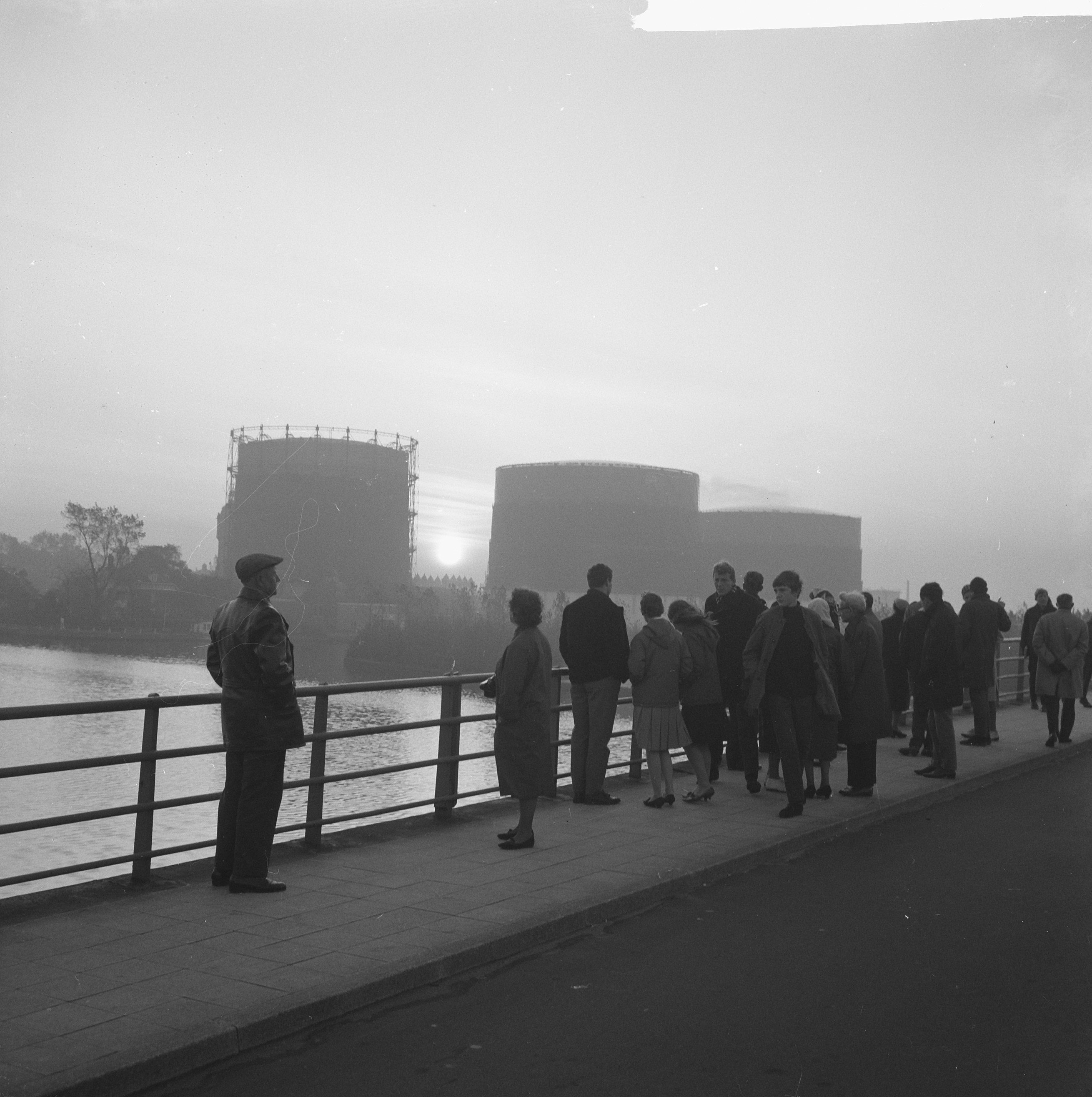
Onlookers in Amsterdam awaiting the comet's apparition on 21 October 1965

Comet Ikeya–Seki was independently discovered on 18 September 1965 by Japanese amateur astronomers Kaoru Ikeya and Tsutomu Seki within roughly 15 minutes of each other. The recent passage of a typhoon had afforded favorably clear conditions for identifying the comet. Upon discovery, the comet was an 8th-magnitude (Note: Unless otherwise noted, all observations of comet magnitude refer to apparent magnitude in visible light. A more negative value for apparent magnitude indicates a brighter object.) object visually located 10° west of α Hydrae, (Note: Reported initial position upon discovery was: α = 8^{h} 45.4^{m} , δ = –8° 38′) moving east across the sky at around 1° per day; acceleration of the comet and significant brightening was observed shortly afterwards. Based on preliminary estimations of Ikeya–Seki's orbit, Fred Whipple of the Smithsonian Astrophysical Observatory conjectured that Ikeya–Seki was a sungrazing comet. Subsequent and more accurate computations of the comet's orbital properties showed a close similarity between Ikeya–Seki and the Great Comet of 1882, including the calculated perihelion of 0.0079 AU (1.2 million km, 0.7 million mi). Leading up to perihelion, Ikeya–Seki's light curve was also similar to the 1882 comet. The comet brightened to magnitude +4 by 7 October, with a tail extending to over 1° in length. By mid-October, the tail had extended to a length of 10°. The comet's approach of the Sun visually placed the comet at increasingly lower altitude and brighter skies, leading to greater difficulty in estimating the comet's brightness as perihelion drew nearer. Nonetheless, Ikeya–Seki's increasing luminosity remained apparent; in the Southern Hemisphere, where visibility of the comet was most favorable around the time of perihelion, observers reported Ikeya–Seki to be as bright as magnitude 0 by 18 October. The comet brightened considerably in the 60 hours after 18 October. By 20 October, the comet had become easily visible with the naked eye in daylight. Ikeya–Seki continued to brighten as perihelion approached, becoming comparable in brightness to the full Moon. The comet also projected a slightly curved tail; 2° of the tail was sufficiently visible to the naked eye with manual obscuration of the Sun. In October–November 1965 the observation was conducted from Mauna Kea, Hawaii. One of the key findings from this study was the documentation of the comet's rapid brightening and the detection of fragmentation in its nucleus. The images obtained provided evidence of the comet's intense interaction with solar radiation and its effects on the comet's physical structure.

Ikeya–Seki reached perihelion at 21:18 UTC on 21 October. As viewed from Earth, the comet and the Sun were separated by only a few arcminutes. Observations indicated that the comet's nucleus began to break apart near the time of perihelion, with Japanese observers noting two small fragments detaching from the primary nucleus that later evaporated soon after. The comet faded after perihelion as it receded from the Sun, with the coma dimming to magnitude +3 by 26 October. However, its tail elongated, reaching a length of at least 15° by 26 October and reaching a maximum of nearly 30° in early November 1965. While the fragmented nucleus of Ikeya–Seki had hitherto remained close together, by 6 November two primary components had become visually distinct in both separation and brightness. Though the comet's coma had dimmed to magnitude 7.4 by 27 November, a tail spanning 10° remained visible to the naked eye. The comet dimmed below naked-eye visibility by early December. The two components of Ikeya–Seki's fractured nucleus remained apparent with increasing visual separation, moving apart at approximately 14 m/s (31 mph); one was brighter but more diffuse in appearance than the other. Extrapolation of the observed positions of the two nuclei calculated by Zdenek Sekanina suggested that the nuclei broke apart on 26 October. Similar calculations by H. Pohn of the United States Geological Survey yielded 26 October as the date of separation, though Sekanina believed Pohn's calculation used different cometary fragments. By 1966, the two fragments were separated by nearly a full arcminute. Although Ikeya–Seki's brightness closely paralleled the Great Comet of 1882, Ikeya–Seki dimmed much more rapidly after perihelion; while the 1882 comet was observed for up to eight months following perihelion, the last photographs of Ikeya–Seki were taken prior to mid-February 1966, after which the comet became fainter than magnitude +13. Ikeya–Seki was indiscernible in a 60-second exposure using a 40-inch reflector telescope at the United States Naval Observatory Flagstaff Station in mid-March 1966.

== Structure and composition ==
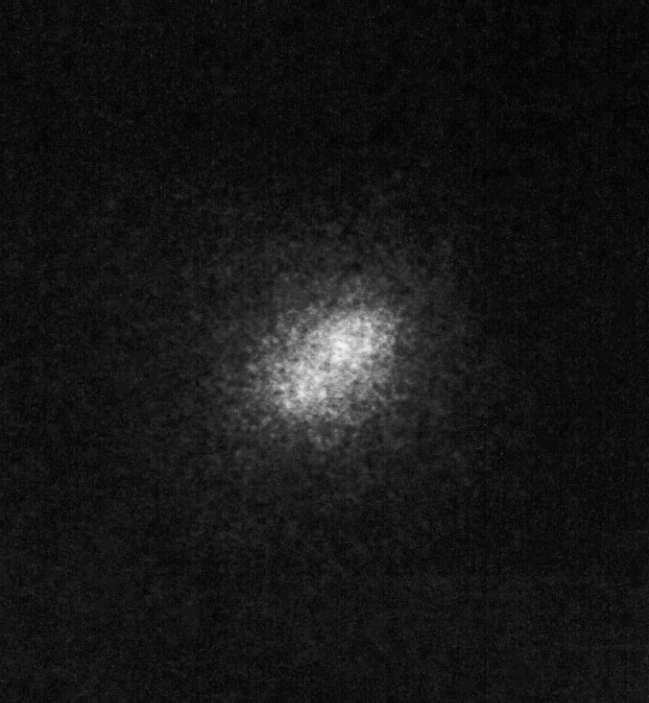
A 6-minute exposure of Ikeya–Seki's nucleus on 6 November 1965, faintly resolving the two primary components of the comet's fractured nucleus

Observations obtained by the McMath–Pierce solar telescope at Kitt Peak National Observatory detected emission lines associated with ionized calcium, chromium, cobalt, copper, iron, manganese, nickel, sodium, vanadium, and cyanide in Ikeya–Seki's coma. The properties of the ionized iron and nickel lines suggested Ikeya–Seki reached an effective temperature of around 4800 K around perihelion.

It is estimated that its nucleus had an effective radius of 4.3 km (2.7 mi) before fragmenting.

== Observing campaigns ==
Ikeya–Seki's perihelion presented a unique opportunity for astrophysical observations to be taken of a bright comet passing extremely close to the Sun. Additionally, the orientation of the comet's orbit with respect to Earth's was virtually ideal for observation of Ikeya–Seki. Several observatories – including Kitt Peak National Observatory, Lick Observatory, and Haute-Provence Observatory – performed spectrographic observations of the comet near perihelion, documenting strong emission lines associated with ionized calcium, iron, sodium, and other metals. Spectrograms were also obtained by a rocket launched from the White Sands Missile Range to observe the comet in ultraviolet. A pair of rocket launches from Wallops Island intended to provide similar data proved unsuccessful. Efforts at MIT and Harvard to detect radio emission from the comet yielded negative results. A Convair 990 operated by NASA out of Hawaii and a Boeing 707 with scientists from Los Alamos National Laboratory were also involved in observational efforts targeting Ikeya–Seki. Gemini 6A was also planned to incorporate observation of the comet until the loss of the Agena target vehicle led to the cancellation of the original mission. Elizabeth Roemer remarked of the breadth of observational data in Publications of the Astronomical Society of the Pacific that "There seems no doubt that the appearance of Comet Ikeya–Seki will stand as a landmark in cometary physics."

== Gallery ==
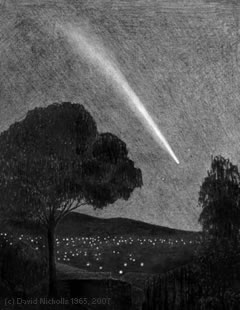
Comet Ikeya–Seki, seen from Canberra, 31 October 1965. Drawing by David Nicholls.

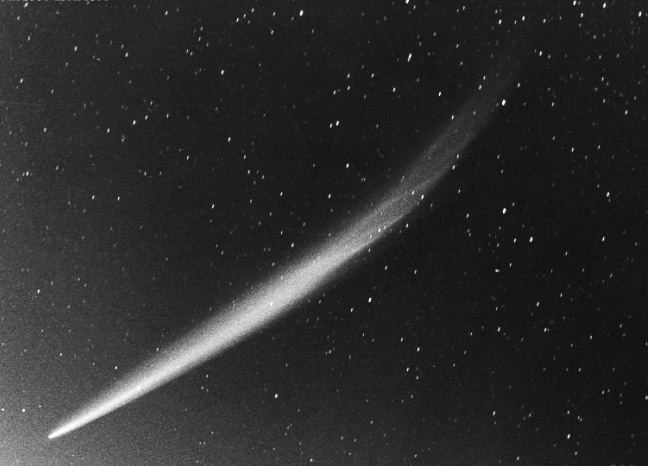
Comet Ikeya–Seki, 30 October 1965. Photo by James W. Young (TMO/JPL/NASA)

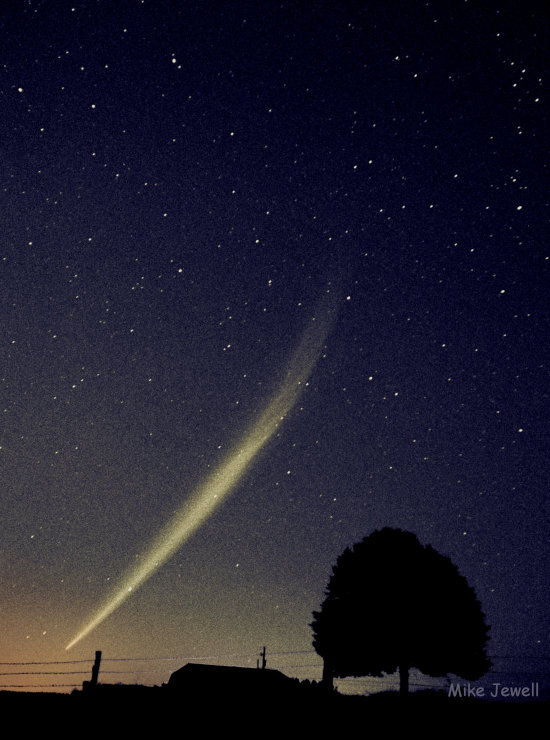
Comet Ikeya-Seki (1965f), Oct 30, 1965. Photo by Michael B Jewell
