= Kaoru Ikeya =

Japanese astronomer

Kaoru Ikeya (池谷 薫, Ikeya Kaoru; born 1943) is a Japanese amateur astronomer who discovered a number of comets.

As a young adult, Ikeya lived near Lake Hamana and worked for a piano factory. During his employment there, he made his first discovery in 1963 with an optical telescope he built himself within his low budget. Two years later, he discovered the bright comet C/1965 S1 (Ikeya-Seki). Ikeya discovered the periodic comet 153P/Ikeya-Zhang on February 1, 2002, in Mori, Hokkaidō. The asteroid 4037 Ikeya is also named after Ikeya. On November 13, 2010, Ikeya and Shigeki Murakami co-discovered the comet P/2010 V1, now known as 332P/Ikeya-Murakami, using an optical telescope, rare in an era with access to digital imaging technology.

Ikeya contributed his skill to the perfectly ground optics used in the construction of the Pentax 40 cm Cassegrain reflector telescope installed at the Singapore Science Centre Observatory in March, 1989.
