= Comet Hyakutake =

Great Comet of 1996

C/1996 B2 (Hyakutake) (Great Comet of 1996)
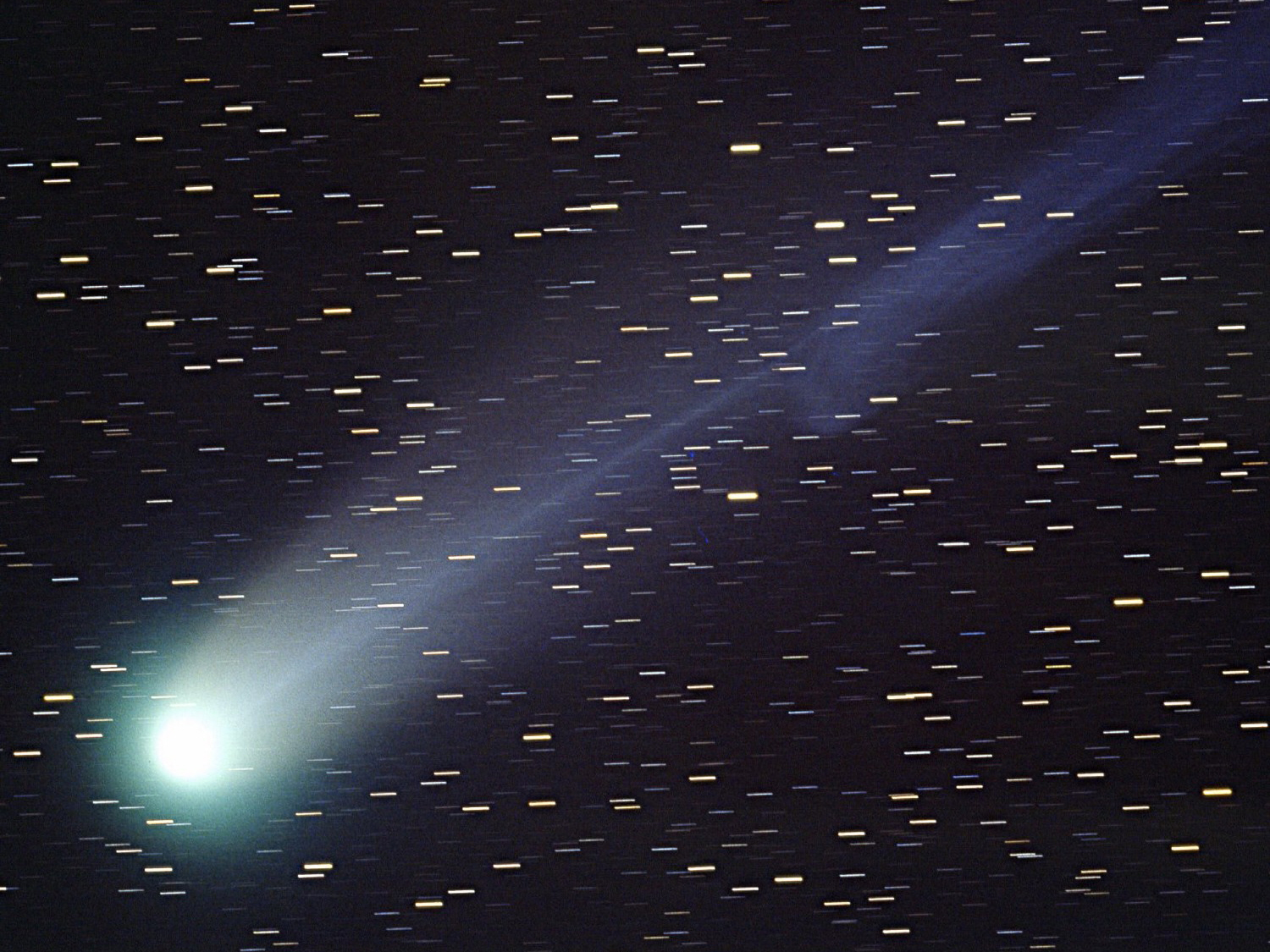
- Comet Hyakutake pictured during its closest approach to Earth on 25 March 1996

Discovery
- Discovered by: Yuji Hyakutake
- Discovery site: Kagoshima, Japan
- Discovery date: 31 January 1996

Designations
- Pronunciation: Japanese pronunciation: [çakɯ̥take]

Orbital characteristics
- Epoch: 15 March 1996 (JD 2450157.5)
- Aphelion: ~1,320 AU (inbound)^{[a]} ~3,500 AU (outbound)
- Perihelion: 0.230 AU
- Semi-major axis: 1,700 AU (outbound)^{[a]}
- Eccentricity: 0.99989
- Orbital period: ~17,000 years (inbound)^{[a]} ~72,000 years (outbound)
- Inclination: 124.922°
- Longitude of ascending node: 188.045°
- Argument of periapsis: 130.175°
- Last perihelion: 1 May 1996
- T_{Jupiter}: –0.338
- Earth MOID: 0.101 AU
- Jupiter MOID: 1.991 AU

Physical characteristics
- Dimensions: 4.2 km (2.6 mi)
- Mass: 1.9×10^{12} kg
- Mean density: 450±90 kg/m^{3}
- Sidereal rotation period: 6.273±0.007 hours
- Comet total magnitude (M1): 7.4
- Comet nuclear magnitude (M2): 11.1
- Apparent magnitude: 0.0 (1996 apparition)

Comet Hyakutake (formally designated C/1996 B2) is a comet discovered on 31 January 1996. It was dubbed the Great Comet of 1996; its passage to within 0.1 AU (15 Gm) of the Earth on 25 March was one of the closest cometary approaches of the previous 200 years. Reaching an apparent visual magnitude of zero and spanning nearly 80°, Hyakutake appeared very bright in the night sky and was widely seen around the world. The comet temporarily upstaged the much anticipated Comet Hale–Bopp, which was approaching the inner Solar System at the time.

Hyakutake is a long-period comet that passed perihelion on 1 May 1996. Before its most recent passage through the Solar System, its orbital period was about 17,000 years, but the gravitational perturbation of the giant planets has increased this period to 70,000 years. This is the first comet to have an X-ray emission detected, which is most likely the result of ionised solar wind particles interacting with neutral atoms in the coma of the comet. The Ulysses spacecraft fortuitously crossed the comet's tail at a distance of more than 500 million km (3.3 AU; 310 million mi) from the nucleus, showing that Hyakutake had the longest tail known for a comet.

== Discovery ==
The comet was discovered on 30 January 1996, by Yuji Hyakutake, an amateur astronomer from southern Japan. He had been searching for comets for years and had moved to Kagoshima Prefecture partly for the dark skies in nearby rural areas. He was using a powerful set of binoculars with 150 mm (6 in) objective lenses to scan the skies on the night of the discovery.

This comet was actually the second Comet Hyakutake; Hyakutake had discovered comet C/1995 Y1 several weeks earlier. While re-observing his first comet (which never became visible to the naked eye) and the surrounding patch of sky, Hyakutake was surprised to find another comet in almost the same position as the first had been. Hardly believing a second discovery so soon after the first, Hyakutake reported his observation to the National Astronomical Observatory of Japan the following morning. Later that day, the discovery was confirmed by independent observations.

At the time of its discovery, the comet was shining at magnitude 11.0 and had a coma approximately 2.5 arcminutes across. It was approximately 2 astronomical units (AU) from the Sun. Later, a precovery image of the comet was found on a photograph taken on 1 January, when the comet was about 2.4 AU from the Sun and had a magnitude of 13.3.

== Orbit ==
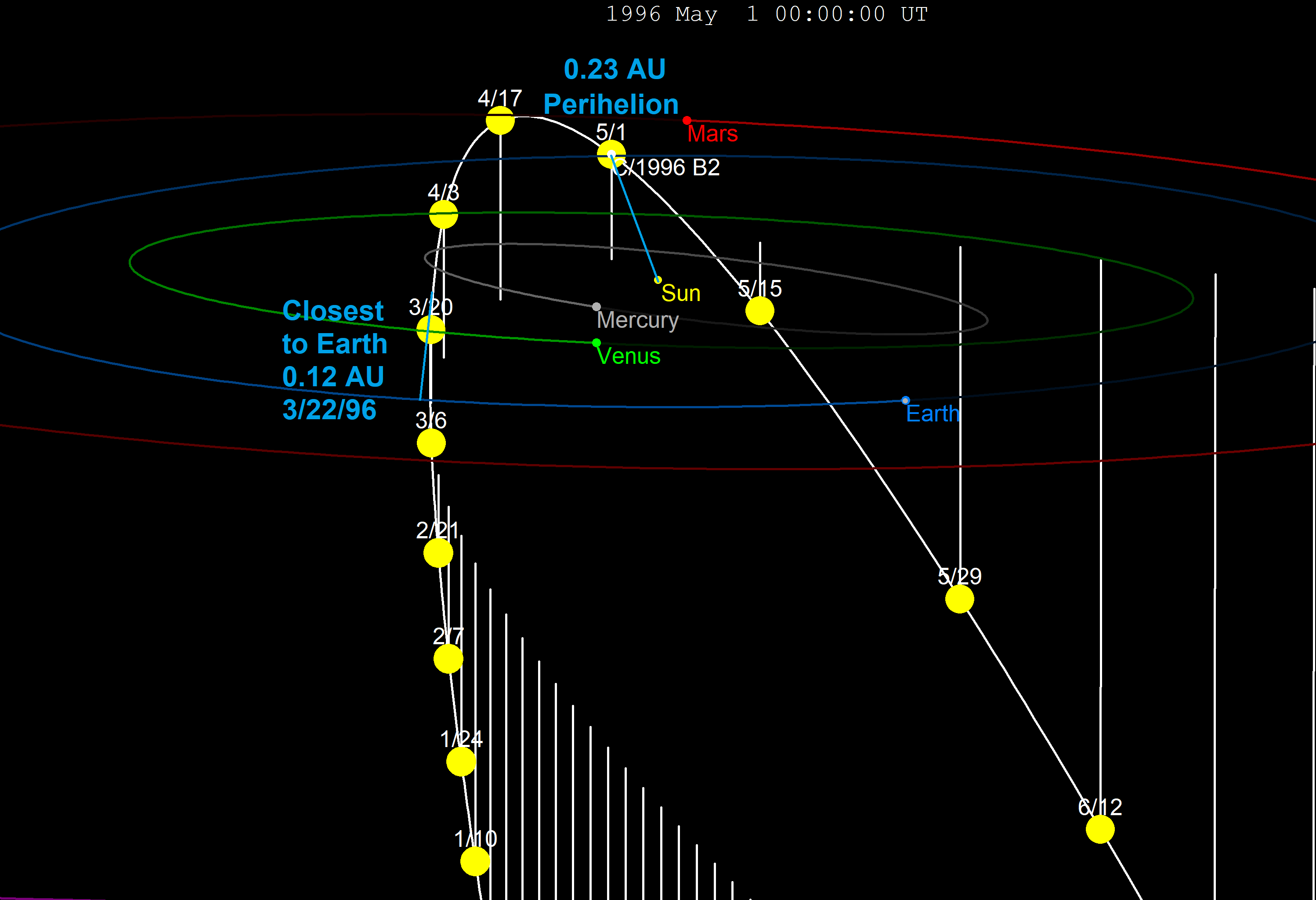
Comet Hyakutake's trajectory through the inner solar system, with a high inclination, passed closest to the Earth in late March 1996, passing over Earth's north pole. It was at perihelion on 1 May.

When the first calculations of the comet's orbit were made, scientists realized that it was going to pass just 0.1 AU from Earth on 25 March. Only four comets in the previous century had passed closer. Comet Hale–Bopp was already being discussed as a possible "great comet"; the astronomical community eventually realised that Hyakutake might also become spectacular because of its close approach.

Moreover, Comet Hyakutake's orbit meant that it had last been to the inner Solar System approximately 17,000 years earlier. Because it had probably passed close to the Sun several times before, the approach in 1996 would not be a maiden arrival from the Oort cloud, a place from where comets with orbital periods of millions of years come. Comets entering the inner Solar System for the first time may brighten rapidly before fading as they near the Sun, because a layer of highly volatile material evaporates. This was the case with Comet Kohoutek in 1973; it was initially touted as potentially spectacular, but only appeared moderately bright. Older comets show a more consistent brightening pattern. Thus, all indications suggested Comet Hyakutake would be bright.

Besides approaching close to Earth, the comet would also be visible throughout the night to Northern Hemisphere observers at its closest approach because of its path, passing very close to the pole star. This would be an unusual occurrence, because most comets are close to the Sun in the sky when the comets are at their brightest, leading to the comets appearing in a sky not completely dark.

== Earth passage ==
Hyakutake became visible to the naked eye in early March 1996. By mid-March, the comet was still fairly unremarkable, shining at 4th magnitude with a tail about 5 degrees long. As it neared its closest approach to Earth, it rapidly became brighter, and its tail grew in length. By 24 March, the comet was one of the brightest objects in the night sky, and its tail stretched 35 degrees. The comet had a notably bluish-green colour.

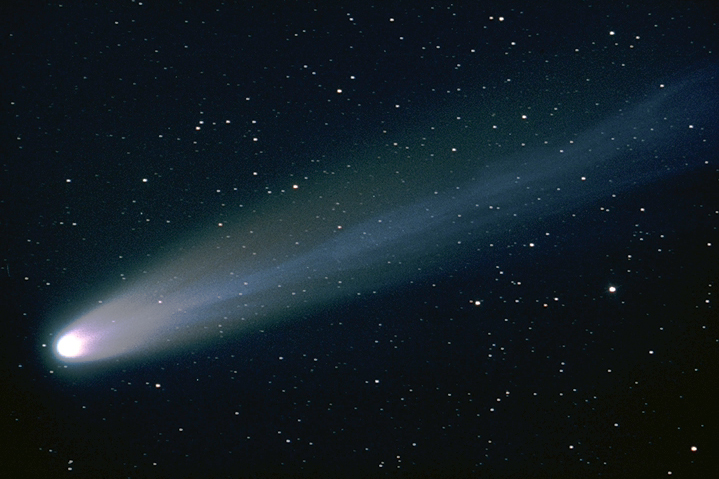
Comet Hyakutake photographed by Franz Haar in March 1996

The closest approach occurred on 25 March at a distance of 0.1 AU (15 million km; 39 LD). Hyakutake was moving so rapidly across the night sky that its movement could be detected against the stars in just a few minutes; it covered the diameter of a full moon (half a degree) every 30 minutes. Observers estimated its magnitude as around 0, and tail lengths of up to 80 degrees were reported. Its coma, now close to the zenith for observers at mid-northern latitudes, appeared approximately 1.5 to 2 degrees across, roughly four times the diameter of the full moon. The comet's head appeared distinctly blue-green, possibly due to emissions from diatomic carbon (C_{2}) combined with sunlight reflected from dust grains.

Because Hyakutake was at its brightest for only a few days, it did not have time to permeate the public imagination in the way that Comet Hale–Bopp did the following year. Many European observers in particular did not see the comet at its peak because of unfavourable weather conditions.

== Perihelion and afterwards ==
After its close approach to the Earth, the comet faded to about 2nd magnitude. It reached perihelion on 1 May 1996, brightening again and exhibiting a dust tail in addition to the gas tail seen as it passed the Earth. By this time, however, it was close to the Sun and was not seen as easily. It was observed passing perihelion by the SOHO Sun-observing satellite, which also recorded a large coronal mass ejection being formed at the same time. The comet's distance from the Sun at perihelion was 0.23 AU, well inside the orbit of Mercury.

After its perihelion passage, Hyakutake faded rapidly and was lost to naked-eye visibility by the end of May. Its orbital path carried it rapidly into the southern skies, but following perihelion it became much less monitored. The last known observation of the comet took place on 2 November.

Hyakutake had passed through the inner Solar System approximately 17,000 years ago; gravitational interactions with the gas giants during its 1996 passage stretched its orbit greatly, and barycentric fits to the comet's orbit predict it will not return to the inner Solar System again for approximately 70,000 years.^{[a]}

== Scientific results ==
=== Spacecraft passes through the tail ===
Animation of Ulysses' trajectory from 6 October 1990 to 29 June 2009 Ulysses · Earth · Jupiter · C/2006 P1 · C/1996 B2 · C/1999 T1

The Ulysses spacecraft made an unexpected pass through the tail of the comet on 1 May 1996. Evidence of the encounter was not noticed until 1998. Astronomers analysing old data found that Ulysses' instruments had detected a large drop in the number of protons passing, as well as a change in the direction and strength of the local magnetic field. This implied that the spacecraft had crossed the 'wake' of an object, most likely a comet; the object responsible was not immediately identified.

In 2000, two teams independently analyzed the same event. The magnetometer team realized that the changes in the direction of the magnetic field mentioned above agreed with the "draping" pattern expected in a comet's ion, or plasma tail. The magnetometer team looked for likely suspects. No known comets were located near the satellite, but looking further afield, they found that Hyakutake, 500 million km (3.3 AU) away, had crossed Ulysses' orbital plane on 23 April 1996. The solar wind had a velocity at the time of about 750 km/s (470 mi/s), at which speed it would have taken eight days for the tail to be carried out to where the spacecraft was situated at 3.73 AU, approximately 45 degrees out of the ecliptic plane. The orientation of the ion tail inferred from the magnetic field measurements agreed with the source lying in Comet Hyakutake's orbital plane.

The other team, working on data from the spacecraft's ion composition spectrometer, discovered a sudden large spike in detected levels of ionised particles at the same time. The relative abundances of chemical elements detected indicated that the object responsible was definitely a comet.

Based on the Ulysses encounter, the comet's tail is known to have been at least 570 million km (360 million miles; 3.8 AU) long. This is almost twice as long as the previous longest-known cometary tail, that of the Great Comet of 1843, which was 2 AU long. This record was broken in 2002 by comet 153P/Ikeya–Zhang, which had a tail-length of at least 7.46 AU.

=== Composition ===
Terrestrial observers found ethane and methane in the comet, the first time either of these gases had been detected in a comet. Chemical analysis showed that the abundances of ethane and methane were roughly equal, which may imply that its ices formed in interstellar space, away from the Sun, which would have evaporated these volatile molecules. Hyakutake's ices must have formed at temperatures of 20 K or less, indicating that it probably formed in a denser-than-average interstellar cloud.

The amount of deuterium in the comet's water ices was determined through spectroscopic observations. It was found that the ratio of deuterium to hydrogen (known as the D/H ratio) was about 3×10^{−4}, which compares to a value in Earth's oceans of about 1.5×10^{−4}. It has been proposed that cometary collisions with Earth might have supplied a large proportion of the water in the oceans, but the high D–H ratio measured in Hyakutake and other comets such as Hale–Bopp and Halley's Comet have caused problems for this theory.

=== X-ray emission ===
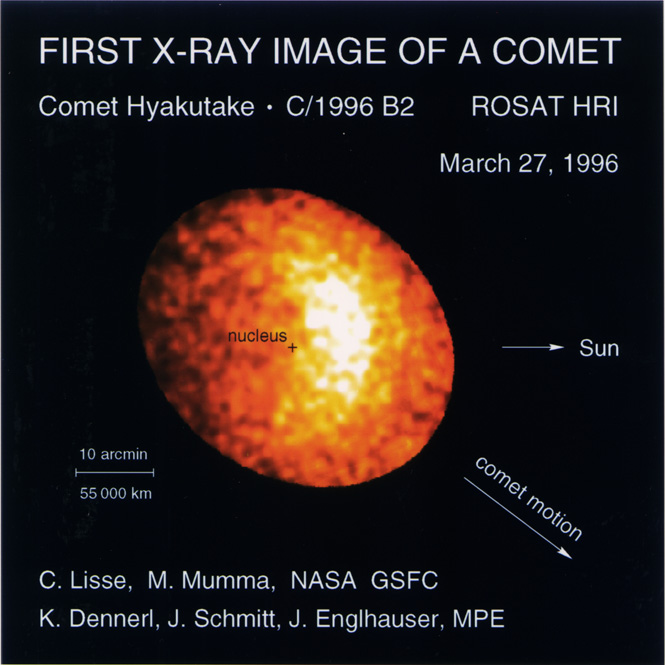
X-ray emission from Hyakutake, as seen by the ROSAT satellite

One of the great surprises of Hyakutake's passage through the inner Solar System was the discovery that it was emitting X-rays, with observations made using the ROSAT satellite revealing very strong X-ray emission. This was the first time a comet had been seen to do so, but astronomers soon found that almost every comet they looked at was emitting X-rays. The emission from Hyakutake was brightest in a crescent shape surrounding the nucleus with the ends of the crescent pointing away from the Sun.

The cause of the X-ray emission is thought to be a combination of two mechanisms. Interactions between energetic solar wind particles and cometary material evaporating from the nucleus is likely to contribute significantly to this effect. Thomas E. Cravens was the first to propose an explanation in early 1997. Reflection of solar X-rays is seen in other Solar System objects such as the Moon, but a simple calculation assuming even the highest X-ray reflectivity possible per molecule or dust grain is not able to explain the majority of the observed flux from Hyakutake, as the comet's atmosphere is very tenuous and diffuse. Observations of comet C/1999 S4 (LINEAR) with the Chandra satellite in 2000 determined that X-rays observed from that comet were produced predominantly by charge exchange collisions between highly charged carbon, oxygen and nitrogen minor ions in the solar wind, and neutral water, oxygen and hydrogen in the comet's coma.

=== Nucleus size and activity ===
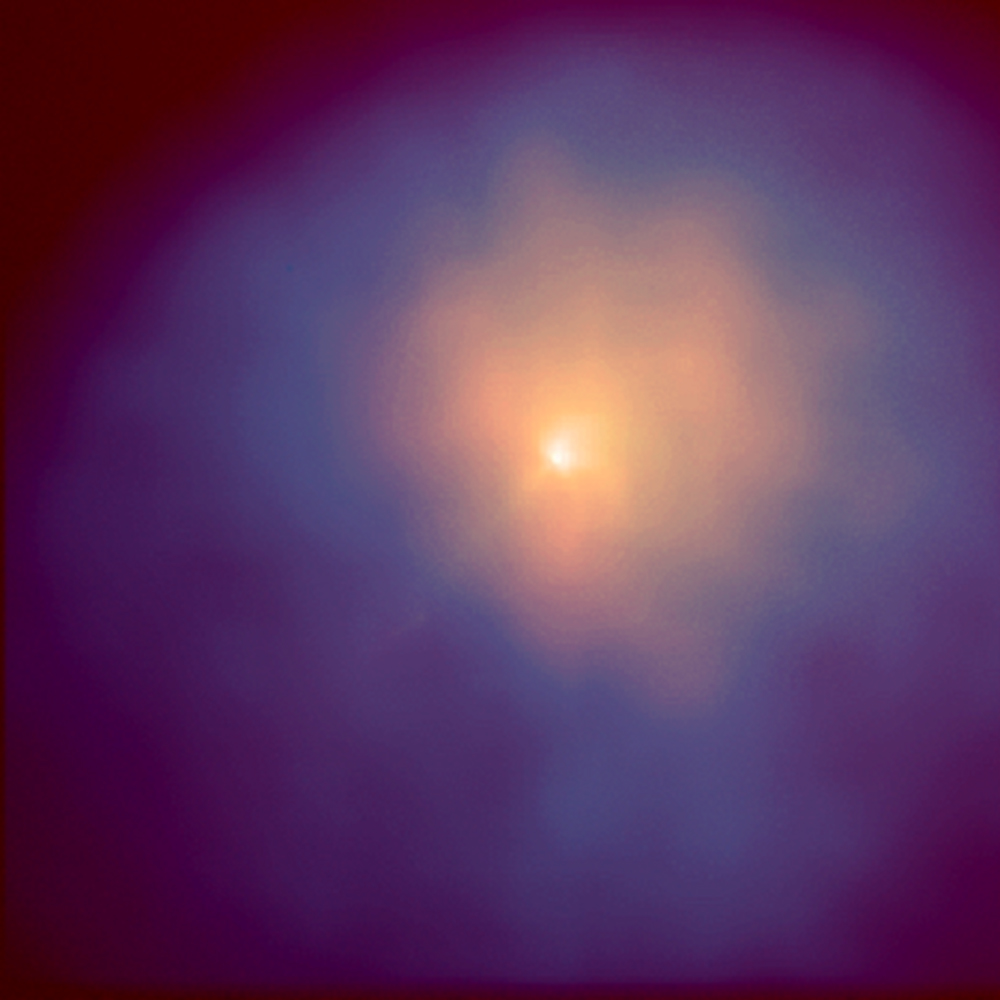
Comet Hyakutake captured by the Hubble Space Telescope on 4 April 1996, with an infrared filter

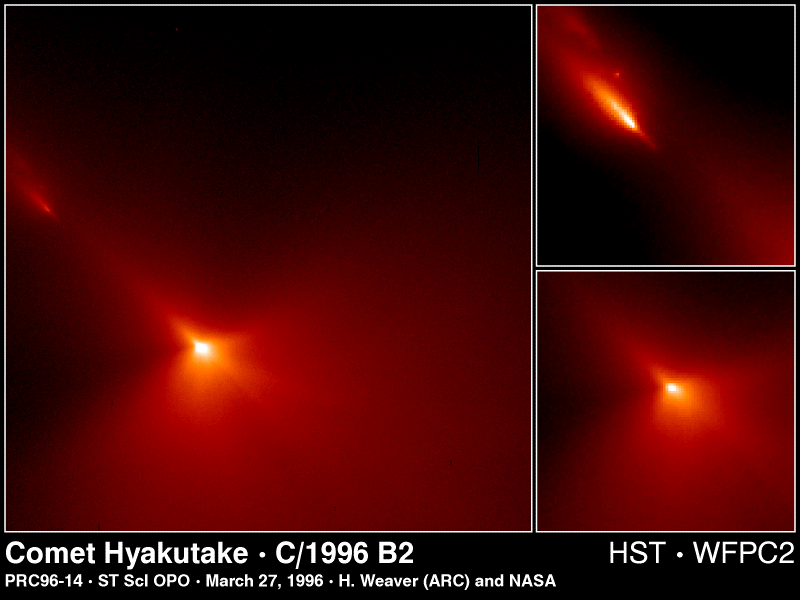
The region around the nucleus of Comet Hyakutake, as seen by the Hubble Space Telescope. Some fragments can be seen breaking off.

Radar results from the Arecibo Observatory indicated that the comet nucleus was about 4.8 km (3 mi) across, and surrounded by a flurry of pebble-sized particles ejected at a few metres per second. This size measurement corresponded well with indirect estimates using infrared emission and radio observations.

The small size of the nucleus (Halley's Comet is about 15 km (9.3 mi) across, while Comet Hale–Bopp was about 60 km (37 mi) across) implies that Hyakutake must have been very active to become as bright as it did. Most comets undergo outgassing from a small proportion of their surface, but most or all of Hyakutake's surface seemed to have been active. The dust production rate was estimated to be about 2×10^{3} kg/s at the beginning of March, rising to 3×10^{4} kg/s as the comet approached perihelion. During the same period, dust ejection velocities increased from 50 m/s to 500 m/s.

Observations of material being ejected from the nucleus allowed astronomers to establish its rotation period. As the comet passed the Earth, a large puff or blob of material was observed being ejected in the sunward direction every 6.23 hours. A second smaller ejection with the same period confirmed this as the rotation period of the nucleus.

== See also ==
- Lists of comets

== Notes ==
1. Solution using the Solar System Barycenter. For objects at such high eccentricity, the Sun's barycentric coordinates are more stable than heliocentric coordinates.
