= C/1999 T1 (McNaught–Hartley) =

Non-periodic comet

C/1999 T1 (McNaught-Hartley)
Discovery
- Discovered by: Robert H. McNaught; Malcolm Hartley
- Discovery site: Siding Spring Observatory
- Discovery date: 7 October 1999

Designations
- Alternative designations: Comet McNaught-Hartley

Orbital characteristics
- Epoch: 2 December 2000 (JD 2451880.5)
- Observation arc: 787 days (2.15 years)
- Number of observations: 661
- Aphelion: 16,247 AU
- Perihelion: 1.172 AU
- Semi-major axis: 8,124 AU
- Eccentricity: 0.99985
- Orbital period: 732,246 years
- Inclination: 79.975°
- Longitude of ascending node: 182.483°
- Argument of periapsis: 344.758°
- Last perihelion: 13 December 2000
- T_{Jupiter}: 0.234
- Earth MOID: 0.19397 AU
- Jupiter MOID: 3.41621 AU

Physical characteristics
- Synodic rotation period: 1–10 days
- Comet total magnitude (M1): 8.3

C/1999 T1 (McNaught–Hartley) is a near-parabolic long-period comet, discovered by Robert H. McNaught and Malcolm Hartley at the Siding Spring Observatory in 1999.

== Observations ==
Comet McNaught–Hartley was a magnitude 15 object upon discovery on October 7, 1999. Gas emissions were measured in x-ray light by the Chandra observatory (alongside C/1999 S4 (LINEAR)) between 8–14 January 2001. Observations of its coma between January 26 and February 5, 2001 show that the nucleus has a rotation period between 1 and 10 days.

== Exploration ==
Research published in 2004 found that the Ulysses spacecraft had likely detected ions from the comet tail of C/1999 T1. This was the spacecraft's second encounter with a comet tail, after Comet Hyakutake in 1996.

== See also ==
- Comet McNaught
