= Ulysses (spacecraft) =

NASA/ESA solar probe launched in 1990

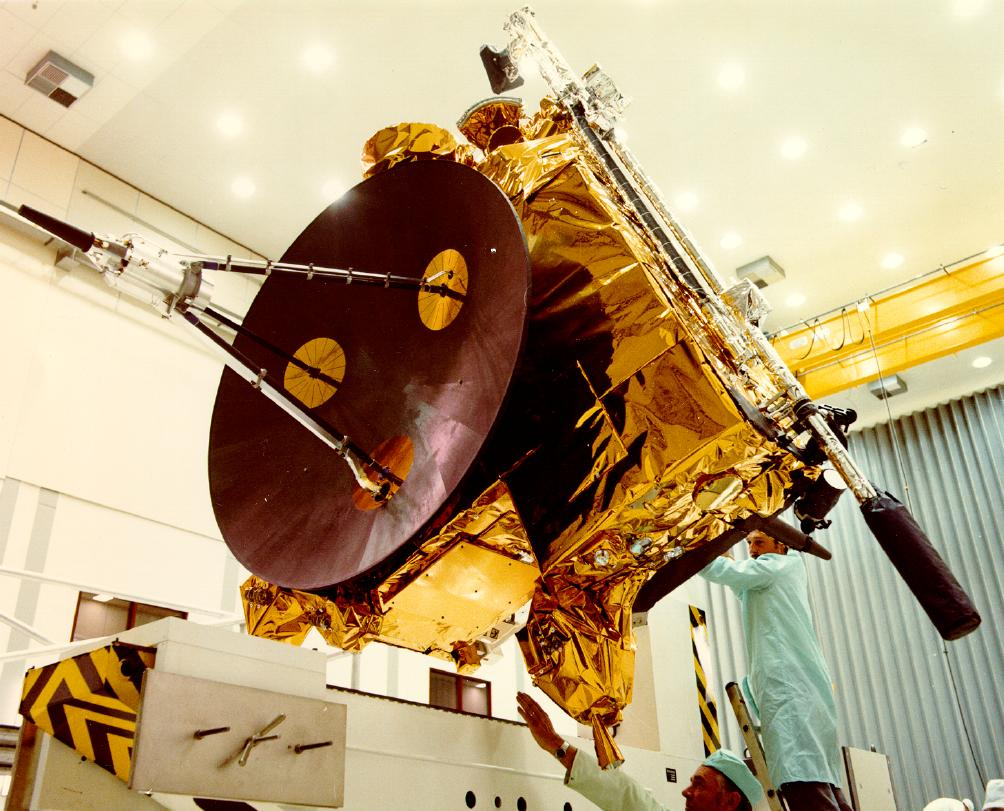
- Ulysses spacecraft
- Names: Odysseus
- Mission type: High-inclination solar orbiter
- Operator: NASA / ESA
- COSPAR ID: 1990-090B
- SATCAT no.: 20842
- Website: NASA Page; ESA Page
- Mission duration: 18 years, 8 months, 24 days

Spacecraft properties
- Manufacturer: Astrium GmbH, Friedrichshafen (formerly Dornier Systems)
- Launch mass: 371 kg (818 lb)
- Payload mass: 55 kg (121 lb)
- Dimensions: 3.2 m × 3.3 m × 2.1 m (10.5 ft × 10.8 ft × 6.9 ft)
- Power: 285 watts

Start of mission
- Launch date: 6 October 1990, 11:47:16 UTC
- Rocket: Space Shuttle Discovery (STS-41) with Inertial Upper Stage and PAM-S
- Launch site: Kennedy Space Center, LC-39B
- Contractor: NASA

End of mission
- Disposal: Decommissioned
- Deactivated: 30 June 2009

Orbital parameters
- Reference system: Heliocentric orbit
- Perihelion altitude: 1.35 AU
- Aphelion altitude: 5.40 AU
- Inclination: 79.11°
- Period: 2,264.26 days (6.2 years)

Flyby of Jupiter (gravity assist)
- Closest approach: 8 February 1992
- Distance: 440,439 km (6.3 Jupiter radii)
- Contemporary ESA insignia (2000s)

Ulysses (/juːˈlɪsiːz/ yoo-LISS-eez, UK also /ˈjuːlɪsiːz/ YOO-liss-eez) was a robotic space probe whose primary mission was to orbit the Sun and study it at all latitudes. It was launched in 1990 and made three "fast latitude scans" of the Sun in 1994/1995, 2000/2001, and 2007/2008. In addition, the probe studied several comets. Ulysses was a joint venture of the European Space Agency (ESA) and the United States' National Aeronautics and Space Administration (NASA), under leadership of ESA with participation from Canada's National Research Council. The last day for mission operations on Ulysses was 30 June 2009.

To study the Sun at all latitudes, the probe needed to change its orbital inclination and leave the plane of the Solar System. To change the orbital inclination of a spacecraft to about 80° requires a large change in heliocentric velocity, the energy to achieve which far exceeded the capabilities of any launch vehicle. To reach the desired orbit around the Sun, the mission's planners chose a gravity assist maneuver around Jupiter, but this Jupiter encounter meant that Ulysses could not be powered by solar cells. The probe was powered instead by a General-Purpose Heat Source Radioisotope Thermoelectric Generator (GPHS-RTG).

The spacecraft was originally named Odysseus, because of its lengthy and indirect trajectory to study the solar poles. It was renamed Ulysses, the Latin translation of "Odysseus", at ESA's request in honor not only of Homer's mythological hero but also of Dante's character in the Inferno. Ulysses was originally scheduled for launch in May 1986 aboard the Space Shuttle Challenger on STS-61-F. Due to the 28 January 1986 loss of Challenger, the launch of Ulysses was delayed until 6 October 1990 aboard Discovery (mission STS-41).

== Spacecraft ==
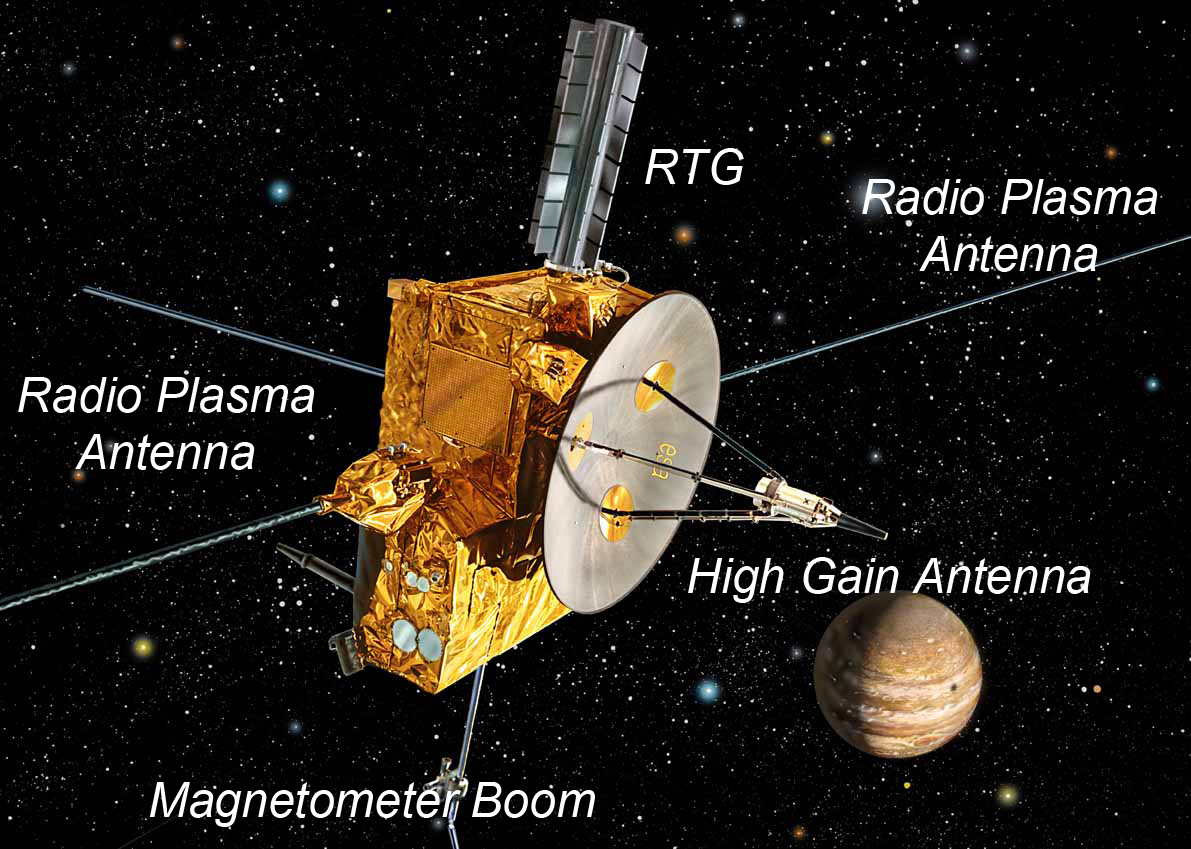
Ulysses spacecraft

The spacecraft was designed by ESA and built by Dornier Systems, a German aircraft manufacturer. The body was roughly a box, approximately 3.2 m × 3.3 m × 2.1 m (10.5 ft × 10.8 ft × 6.9 ft) in size. The box mounted the 1.65 m (5 ft 5 in) dish antenna and the GPHS-RTG radioisotope thermoelectric generator (RTG) power source. The box was divided into noisy and quiet sections. The noisy section abutted the RTG; the quiet section housed the instrument electronics. Particularly "loud" components, such as the preamps for the radio dipole, were mounted outside the structure entirely, and the box acted as a Faraday cage.

Ulysses was spin-stabilised about its z-axis which roughly coincides with the axis of the dish antenna. The RTG, whip antennas, and instrument boom were placed to stabilize this axis, with the spin rate nominally at 5 rpm. Inside the body was a hydrazine fuel tank. Hydrazine monopropellant was used for course corrections inbound to Jupiter, and later used exclusively to repoint the spin axis (and thus, the antenna) at Earth. The spacecraft was controlled by eight thrusters in two blocks. Thrusters were pulsed in the time domain to perform rotation or translation. Four Sun sensors detected orientation. For fine attitude control, the S-band antenna feed was mounted slightly off-axis. This offset feed combined with the spacecraft spin introduced an apparent oscillation to a radio signal transmitted from Earth when received on board the spacecraft. The amplitude and phase of this oscillation were proportional to the orientation of the spin axis relative to the Earth direction. This method of determining the relative orientation is called conical scanning and was used by early radars for automated tracking of targets and was also very common in early infrared guided missiles.

The spacecraft used S-band for uplinked commands and downlinked telemetry, through dual redundant 5-watt transceivers. The spacecraft used X-band for science return (downlink only), using dual 20 watts TWTAs until the failure of the last remaining TWTA in January 2008. Both bands used the dish antenna with prime-focus feeds, unlike the Cassegrain feeds of most other spacecraft dishes.

Dual tape recorders, each of approximately 45-megabit capacity, stored science data between the nominal eight-hour communications sessions during the prime and extended mission phases.

The spacecraft was designed to withstand both the heat of the inner Solar System and the cold at Jupiter's distance. Extensive blanketing and electric heaters protected the probe against the cold temperatures of the outer Solar System.

Multiple computer systems (CPUs/microprocessors/Data Processing Units) are used in several of the scientific instruments, including several radiation-hardened RCA CDP1802 microprocessors. Documented 1802 usage includes dual-redundant 1802s in the COSPIN, and at least one 1802 each in the GRB, HI-SCALE, SWICS, SWOOPS and URAP instruments, with other possible microprocessors incorporated elsewhere.

Total mass at launch was 371 kg (818 lb), of which 33.5 kg was hydrazine propellant used for attitude control and orbit correction.

== Instruments ==
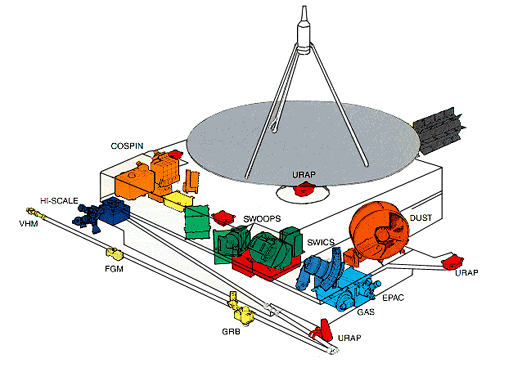
Ulysses instruments

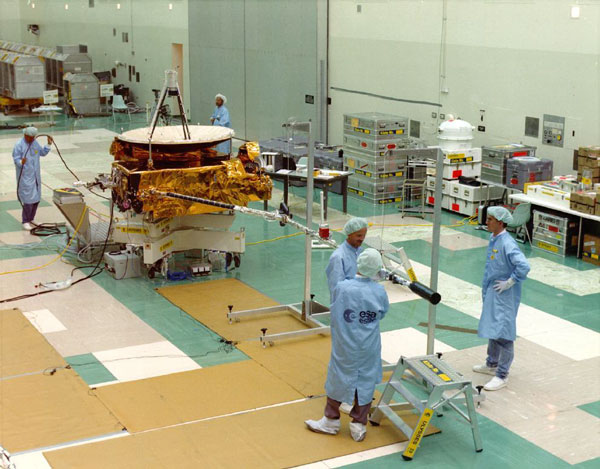
Ulysses radial boom test

The twelve different Instruments came from ESA and NASA. The first design was based on two probes, one by NASA and one by ESA, but the probe of NASA was defunded and in the end the instruments of the cancelled probe were mounted on Ulysses.

- Radio/Plasma antennas: Two beryllium copper antennas were unreeled outwards from the body, perpendicular to the RTG and spin axis. Together this dipole spanned 72 meters (236.2 ft). A third antenna, of hollow beryllium copper, was deployed from the body, along the spin axis opposite the dish. It was a monopole antenna, 7.5 meters (24.6 ft) long. These measured radio waves generated by plasma releases, or the plasma itself as it passed over the spacecraft. This receiver ensemble was sensitive from DC to 1 MHz.
- Experiment Boom: A third type of boom, shorter and much more rigid, extended from the last side of the spacecraft, opposite the RTG. This was a hollow carbon-fiber tube, of 50 mm (2 in.) diameter. It can be seen in the photo as the silver rod stowed alongside the body. It carried four types of instruments: a solid-state X-ray instrument, composed of two silicon detectors, to study X-rays from solar flares and Jupiter's aurorae; the Gamma-Ray Burst experiment, consisting of two CsI scintillator crystals with photomultipliers; two different magnetometers, a helium vector magnetometer and a fluxgate magnetometer; and a two-axis magnetic search coil antenna measured AC magnetic fields.
- Body-Mounted Instruments: Detectors for electrons, ions, neutral gas, dust, and cosmic rays were mounted on the spacecraft body around the quiet section.
- Lastly, the radio communications link could be used to search for gravitational waves (through Doppler shifts) and to probe the Sun's atmosphere through radio occultation. No gravitational waves were detected.
- Total instrument mass was 55 kg.
- Magnetometer (MAG): MAG measured the magnetic field in the heliosphere. Measurements of Jupiter's magnetic field were also performed. Two magnetometers performed Ulysses' magnetic field measurements, the Vector Helium Magnetometer and the Fluxgate Magnetometer.
- Solar Wind Plasma Experiment (SWOOPS): detected the solar wind at all solar distances and latitudes and in three dimensions. It measured positive ions and electrons.
- Solar Wind Ion Composition Instrument (SWICS): determined composition, temperature and speed of the atoms and ions that comprise the solar wind.
- Unified Radio and Plasma Wave Instrument (URAP): picked up radio waves from the Sun and electromagnetic waves generated in the solar wind close to the spacecraft.
- Energetic Particle Instrument (EPAC) and GAS: EPAC investigated the energy, fluxes and distribution of energetic particles in the heliosphere. GAS studied the uncharged gases (helium) of interstellar origin.
- Low-Energy Ion and Electron Experiment (HI-SCALE): investigated the energy, fluxes and distribution of energetic particles in the heliosphere.
- Cosmic Ray and Solar Particle Instrument (COSPIN): investigated the energy, fluxes and distribution of energetic particles and galactic cosmic rays in the heliosphere.
- Solar X-ray and Cosmic Gamma-Ray Burst Instrument (GRB): studied cosmic gamma ray bursts and X-rays from solar flares.
- Dust Experiment (DUST): Direct measurements of interplanetary and interstellar dust grains to investigate their properties as functions of the distance from the Sun and solar latitude.

== Mission ==
=== Planning ===
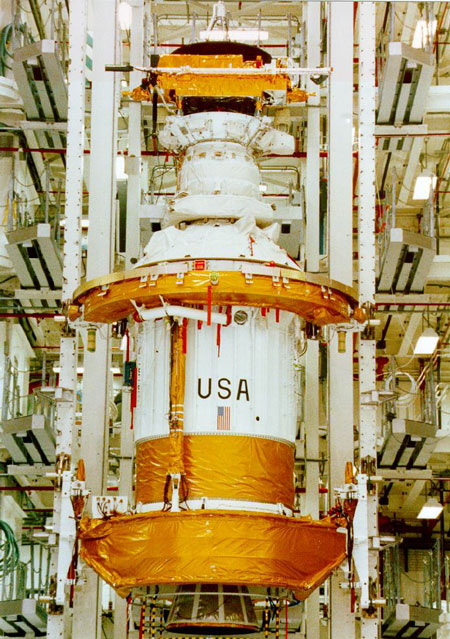
Ulysses sits atop the PAM-S and IUS combination

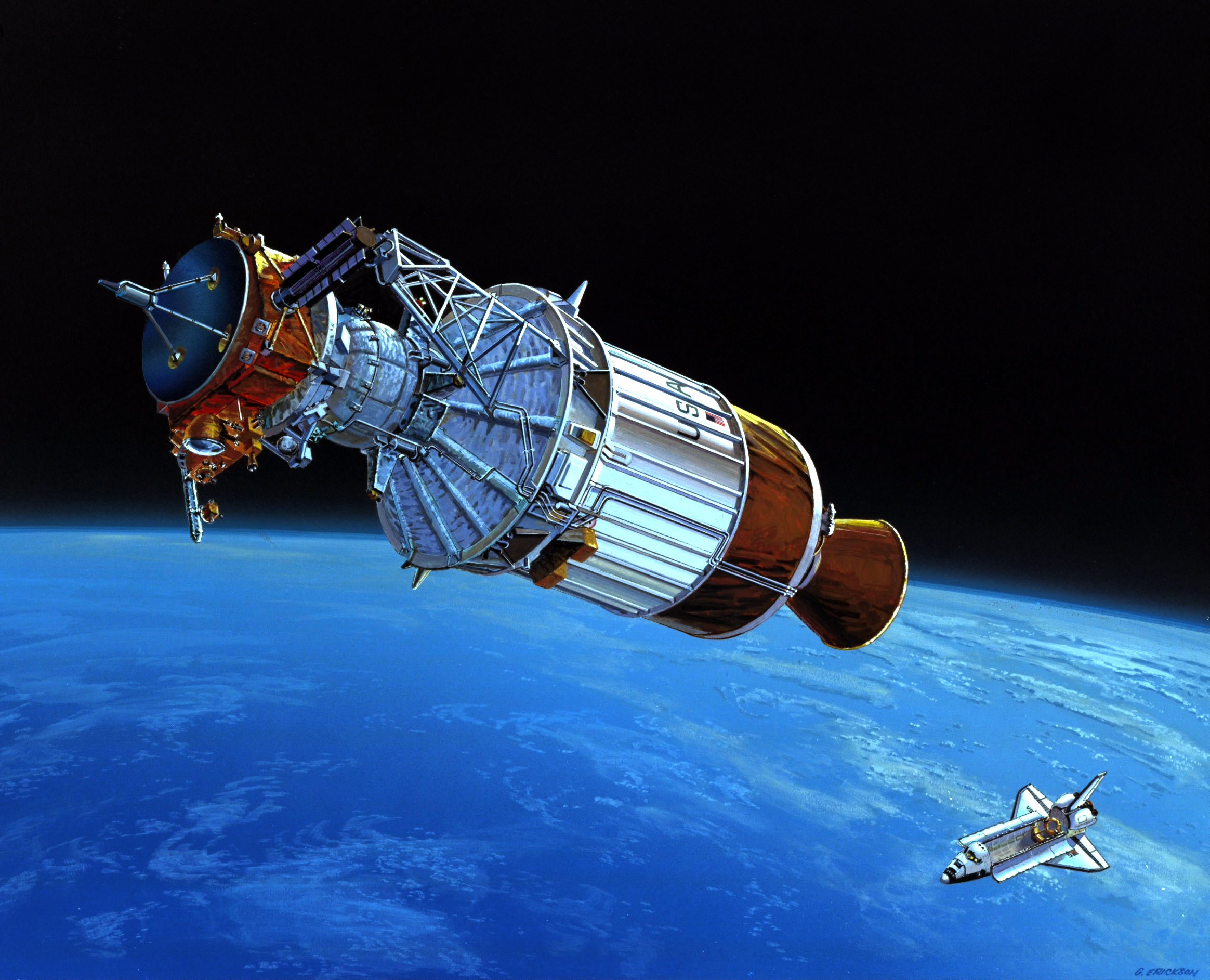
Illustration of Ulysses after deployment

A 1980 drawing of NASA's probe for the ISPM. This would be cancelled in February 1981, primarily due to severe funding issues.

A 1980 drawing of ESA's probe for the ISPM. This design would evolve into Ulysses.

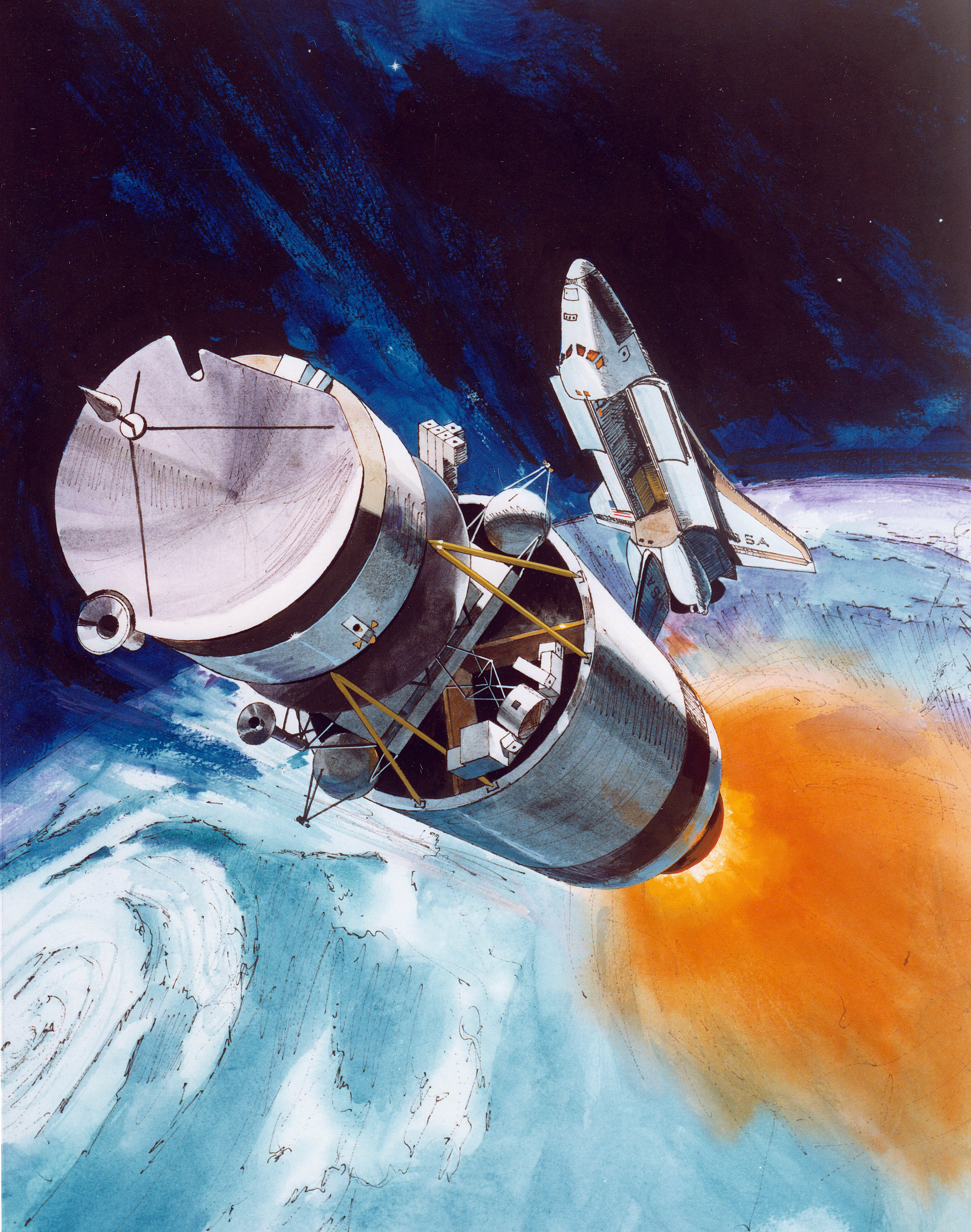
Illustration of Solar Polar on IUS

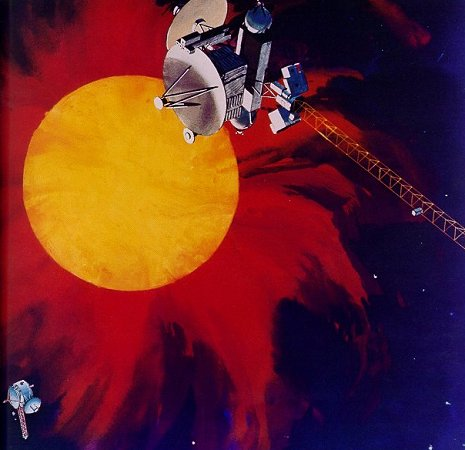
1981 concept showing one of two ISPM probes orbiting the Sun

Until Ulysses, the Sun had only been observed from low solar latitudes. The Earth's orbit defines the ecliptic plane, which differs from the Sun's equatorial plane by only 7.25°. Even spacecraft directly orbiting the Sun do so in planes close to the ecliptic because a direct launch into a high-inclination solar orbit would require a prohibitively large launch vehicle.

Several spacecraft (Mariner 10, Pioneer 11, and Voyagers 1 and 2) had performed gravity assist maneuvers in the 1970s. Those maneuvers were to reach other planets also orbiting close to the ecliptic, so they were mostly in-plane changes. However, gravity assists are not limited to in-plane maneuvers; a suitable flyby of Jupiter could produce a significant plane change. An Out-Of-The-Ecliptic mission (OOE) was thereby proposed.

Originally, two spacecraft were to be built by NASA and ESA, as the International Solar Polar Mission. One would be sent over Jupiter, then under the Sun. The other would fly under Jupiter, then over the Sun. This would provide simultaneous coverage. Due to cutbacks, the U.S. spacecraft was cancelled in 1981. One spacecraft was designed, and the project recast as Ulysses, due to the indirect and untried flight path. NASA would provide the Radioisotope Thermoelectric Generator (RTG) and launch services, ESA would build the spacecraft assigned to Astrium GmbH, Friedrichshafen, Germany (formerly Dornier Systems). The instruments would be split into teams from universities and research institutes in Europe and the United States. This process provided the 12 instruments on board.

The changes delayed launch from February 1983 to May 1986 when it was to be deployed by the Space Shuttle Challenger (boosted by the proposed Centaur G Prime upper stage). However, the Challenger disaster forced a two-and-a-half year stand down of the shuttle fleet, mandated the cancellation of the Centaur-G upper stage, and pushed the launch date to October 1990.

=== Launch ===
Ulysses was deployed into low Earth orbit from the Space Shuttle Discovery. From there, it was propelled on a trajectory to Jupiter by a combination of solid rocket motors. This upper stage consisted of a two-stage Boeing IUS (Inertial Upper Stage), plus a McDonnell Douglas PAM-S (Payload Assist Module-Special). The IUS was inertially stabilised and actively guided during its burn. The PAM-S was unguided and it and Ulysses were spun up to 80 rpm for stability at the start of its burn. On burnout of the PAM-S, the motor and spacecraft stack was yo-yo de-spun (weights deployed at the end of cables) to below 8 rpm prior to separation of the spacecraft. On leaving Earth, the spacecraft became the fastest ever artificially-accelerated spacecraft, and held that title until the New Horizons probe was launched.

On its way to Jupiter, the spacecraft was in an elliptical non-Hohmann transfer orbit. At this time, Ulysses had a low orbital inclination to the ecliptic.

=== Jupiter swing-by ===
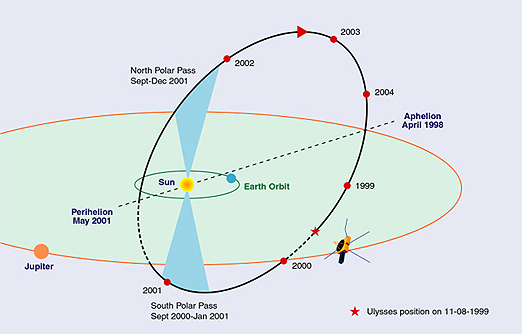
Ulysses' second orbit (1999–2004)

Animation of Ulysses's trajectory from 6 October 1990 to 29 June 2009 Ulysses · Earth · Jupiter · C/2006 P1 · C/1996 B2 · C/1999 T1

It made its closest approach of 6.31 planetary radii from Jupiter on 8 February 1992 during a swing-by maneuver that increased its inclination to the ecliptic by 80.2°. The giant planet's gravity bent the spacecraft's flight path southward and away from the ecliptic plane. This put it into a final orbit around the Sun that would take it past the Sun's north and south poles. The size and shape of the orbit were adjusted to a much smaller degree so that aphelion remained at approximately 5 AU, Jupiter's distance from the Sun, and perihelion was somewhat greater than 1 AU, the Earth's distance from the Sun. The orbital period is approximately six years.

=== Polar regions of the Sun ===
Between 1994 and 1995 it explored both the southern and northern polar regions of the Sun, respectively.

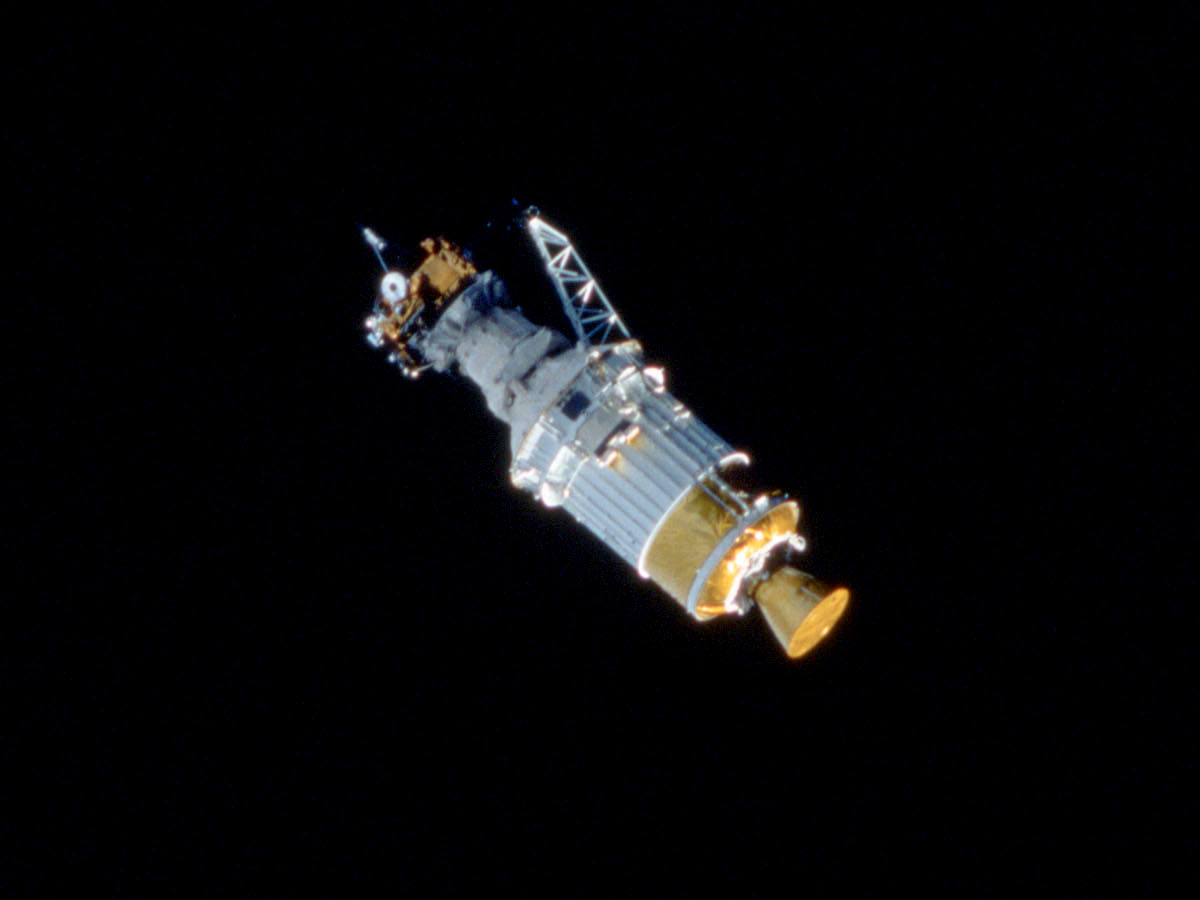
Ulysses after deployment from STS-41

=== Comet C/1996 B2 (Hyakutake) ===
On 1 May 1996, the spacecraft unexpectedly crossed the ion tail of Comet Hyakutake (C/1996 B2), revealing the tail to be at least 3.8 AU in length.

=== Comet C/1999 T1 (McNaught–Hartley) ===
An encounter with a comet tail happened again in 2004 when Ulysses flew through the ion tailings of C/1999 T1 (McNaught-Hartley). A coronal mass ejection carried the cometary material to Ulysses.

=== Second Jupiter encounter ===
Ulysses approached aphelion in 2003/2004 and made further distant observations of Jupiter.

=== Comet C/2006 P1 (McNaught) ===
In 2007, Ulysses passed through the tail of comet C/2006 P1 (McNaught). The results were surprisingly different from its pass through Hyakutake's tail, with the measured solar wind velocity dropping from approximately 700 kilometers per second (1,566,000 mph) to less than 400 kilometers per second (895,000 mph).

=== Extended mission ===
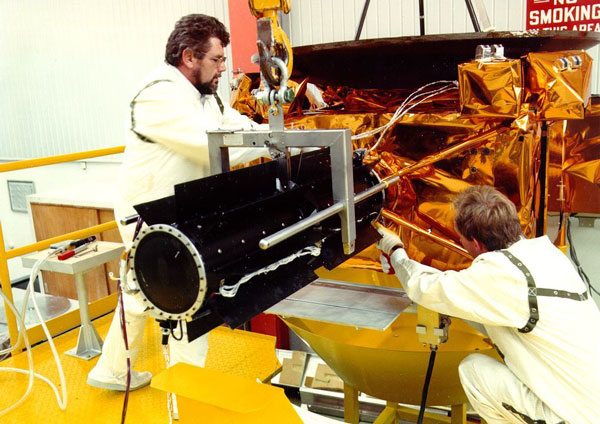
Ulysses Radioisotope thermoelectric generator

ESA's Science Program Committee approved the fourth extension of the Ulysses mission to March 2004 thereby allowing it to operate over the Sun's poles for the third time in 2007 and 2008. After it became clear that the power output from the spacecraft's RTG would be insufficient to operate science instruments and keep the attitude control fuel, hydrazine, from freezing, instrument power sharing was initiated. Up until then, the most important instruments had been kept online constantly, whilst others were deactivated. When the probe neared the Sun, its power-hungry heaters were turned off and all instruments were turned on.

On 22 February 2008, 17 years and 4 months after the launch of the spacecraft, ESA and NASA announced that the mission operations for Ulysses would likely cease within a few months. On 12 April 2008, NASA announced that the end date would be 1 July 2008.

The spacecraft operated successfully for over four times its design life. A component within the last remaining working chain of X-band downlink subsystem failed on 15 January 2008. The other chain in the X-band subsystem had previously failed in 2003.

Downlink to Earth resumed on S-band, but the beamwidth of the high gain antenna in the S-band was not as narrow as in the X–band, so that the received downlink signal was much weaker, hence reducing the achievable data rate. As the spacecraft traveled on its outbound trajectory to the orbit of Jupiter, the downlink signal would have eventually fallen below the receiving capability of even the largest antennas (70 meters - 229.7 feet - in diameter) of the Deep Space Network.

Even before the downlink signal was lost due to distance, the hydrazine attitude control fuel on board the spacecraft was considered likely to freeze, as the radioisotope thermal generators (RTGs) failed to generate enough power for the heaters to overcome radiative heat loss into space. Once the hydrazine froze, the spacecraft would no longer be able to maneuver to keep its high gain antenna pointing towards Earth, and the downlink signal would then be lost in a matter of days. The failure of the X-band communications subsystem hastened this, because the coldest part of the fuel pipework was routed over the X-band traveling-wave tube amplifiers, because they generated enough heat during operation to keep the propellant plumbing warm.

The previously announced mission end date of 1 July 2008, came and went but mission operations continued albeit in a reduced capacity. The availability of science data gathering was limited to only when Ulysses was in contact with a ground station due to the deteriorating S-band downlink margin no longer being able to support simultaneous real-time data and tape recorder playback. When the spacecraft was out of contact with a ground station, the S-band transmitter was switched off and the power was diverted to the internal heaters to add to the warming of the hydrazine. On 30 June 2009, ground controllers sent commands to switch to the low gain antennas. This stopped communications with the spacecraft, in combination with previous commands to shut down its transmitter entirely.

== Results ==
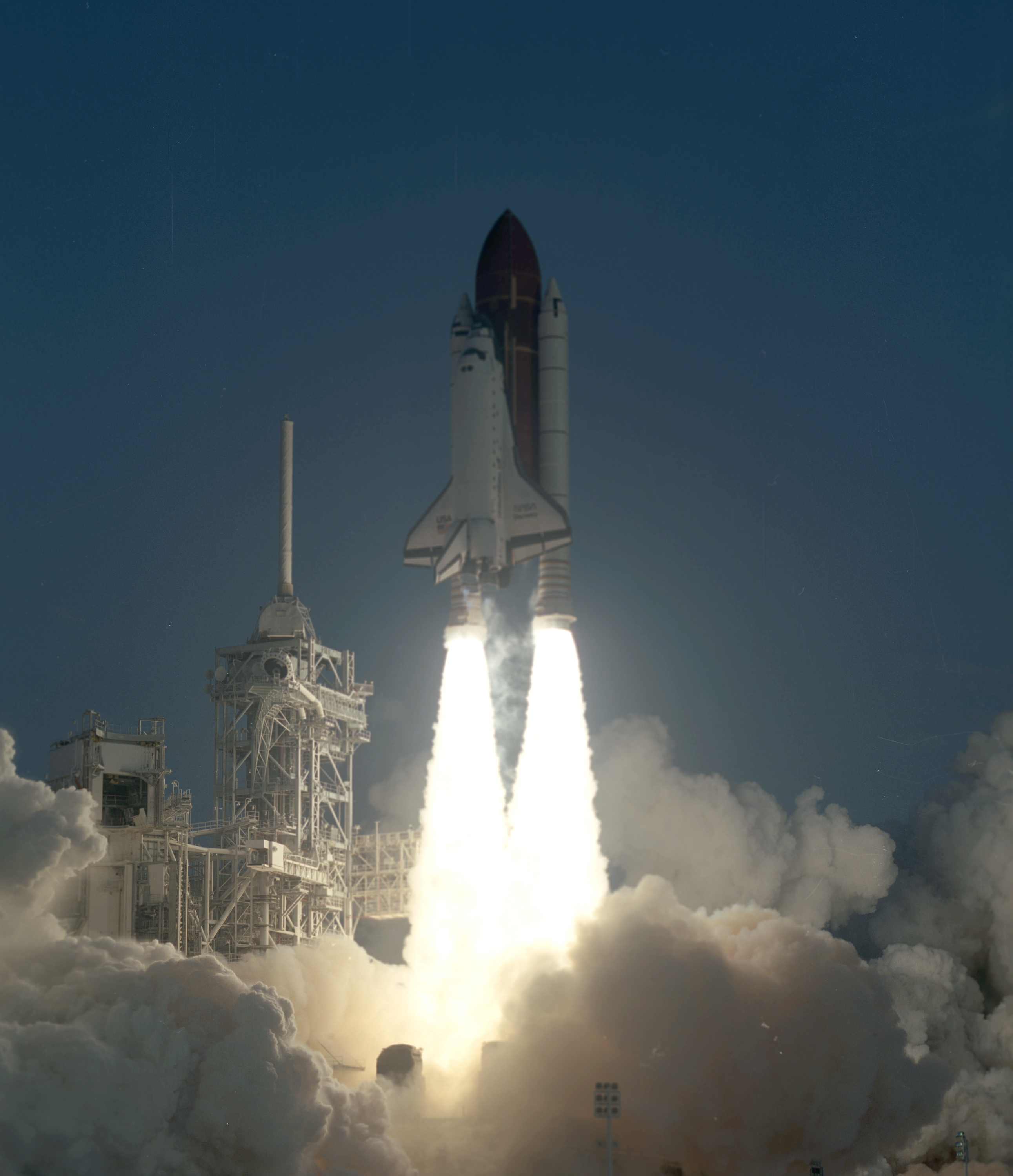
STS-41 launches from Kennedy Space Center, 6 October 1990.

During cruise phases, Ulysses provided unique data. As the only spacecraft out of the ecliptic with a gamma-ray instrument, Ulysses was an important part of the InterPlanetary Network (IPN). The IPN detects gamma ray bursts (GRBs); since gamma rays cannot be focused with mirrors, it was very difficult to locate GRBs with enough accuracy to study them further. Instead, several spacecraft can locate the burst through multilateration. Each spacecraft has a gamma-ray detector, with readouts noted in tiny fractions of a second. By comparing the arrival times of gamma showers with the separations of the spacecraft, a location can be determined, for follow-up with other telescopes. Because gamma rays travel at the speed of light, wide separations are needed. Typically, a determination came from comparing: one of several spacecraft orbiting the Earth, an inner-Solar-System probe (to Mars, Venus, or an asteroid), and Ulysses. When Ulysses crossed the ecliptic twice per orbit, many GRB determinations lost accuracy.

Additional discoveries:

- Data provided by Ulysses led to the discovery that the Sun's magnetic field interacts with the Solar System in a more complex fashion than previously assumed.
- Data provided by Ulysses led to the discovery that dust coming into the Solar System from deep space was 30 times more abundant than previously expected.
- In 2007–2008 data provided by Ulysses led to the determination that the magnetic field emanating from the Sun's poles is much weaker than previously observed.
- That the solar wind has "grown progressively weaker during the mission and is currently at its weakest since the start of the Space Age".

== Fate ==
Ulysses will most likely continue in heliocentric orbit around the Sun indefinitely. However, there is a chance that in one of its re-encounters with Jupiter a close fly-by with one of the Jovian moons would be enough to alter its course and so the probe would enter a hyperbolic trajectory around the Sun and leave the Solar System.

== See also ==
- Advanced Composition Explorer – NASA satellite of the Explorer program, at SE-L1 from 1997
- List of heliophysics missions
- List of missions to the outer planets
- Parker Solar Probe – NASA probe of the Sun's outer corona
- Solar and Heliospheric Observatory – European space observatory
- STEREO – NASA solar observation mission launched in 2006
- TRACE – NASA satellite of the Explorer program
- WIND – NASA probe to study solar wind, at L1 since 1995
- Solar Orbiter – European space-based solar observatory
- Solar Polar Orbit Observatory – Planned Chinese solar orbiter
- Pioneer H
