= Yuji Hyakutake =

Japanese amateur astronomer

- Born: July 7, 1950; Shimabara, Nagasaki, Japan
- Died: April 10, 2002 (aged 51); Kokubu, Kagoshima, Japan

Yuji Hyakutake (百武 裕司, Hyakutake Yūji; July 7, 1950 – April 10, 2002) was a Japanese amateur astronomer who discovered Comet C/1996 B2, also known as Comet Hyakutake on January 31, 1996, while using 25×150 binoculars.

Hyakutake graduated from the Kyushu Sangyo University as a photography major and started working at a newspaper in Fukuoka. He first became interested in astronomy after seeing Comet Ikeya–Seki in 1965. He began searching for comets in 1989. In 1993, he moved to Hayato because “the skies were much clearer there” and so he could better continue his search for comets. His first discovery was Comet C/1995 Y1, on December 26, 1995.

Hyakutake discovered C/1996 B2 while looking for C/1995 Y1, a comet he had discovered a few weeks before.

He died in Kokubu, Kagoshima, in 2002 at age 51 of an aneurysm which had led to internal bleeding.

Asteroid 7291 Hyakutake is named after him.
