= Thomas E. Cravens =

American space physicist

- Education: Harvard University (Ph.D.); State University of New York at Stony Brook (B.A.)
- Known for: Cometary X-ray emission model Solar wind interactions with planets and comets
- Awards: Fellow of the AAAS (2018); Higuchi Award (2005); Fellow of AGU (2001); AGU Editors' Citation for Excellence in Refereeing (2003)
- Scientific career
- Fields: Space physics, Planetary science
- Workplaces: University of Kansas; University of Michigan
- Doctoral advisor: Alex Dalgarno

Thomas E. Cravens is an American space physicist and Professor Emeritus in the Department of Physics and Astronomy at the University of Kansas. He is known for developing the widely accepted model explaining the emission of X-rays from comets, a phenomenon discovered unexpectedly in 1996.

== Early life and education ==
Cravens received his B.A. in physics from State University of New York at Stony Brook in 1970. He then pursued graduate studies at Harvard University, where he earned his Ph.D. in astronomy in 1975 under the supervision of Alex Dalgarno. His doctoral dissertation was titled "Astrophysical Applications of Electron Energy Deposition in Molecular Hydrogen.".

== Career ==
After receiving his Ph.D., Cravens worked at the Space Physics Research Laboratory at the University of Michigan. He later joined the faculty of the University of Kansas Department of Physics and Astronomy, where he is currently a Professor Emeritus.

His research spans a range of topics in space plasma physics, focusing on the interactions of the solar wind with planets (including Earth, Mars, Venus, and the outer planets) and comets. He also investigates the physics of planetary ionospheres and magnetospheres, and the interstellar medium.

== Cometary X-ray emission ==
A significant contribution by Cravens is his model explaining the emission of X-rays from comets. Prior to the observation of X-rays from Comet Hyakutake in 1996 by the ROSAT satellite, cold bodies like comets were not generally expected to be significant X-ray sources.

Cravens proposed that the primary mechanism is charge exchange (also known as charge transfer) between highly charged heavy ions in the solar wind and neutral atoms and molecules in the cometary coma. The solar wind contains ions such as O^{6+}, O^{7+}, C^{5+}, and C^{6+}. When these ions encounter the neutral gas sublimating from the comet's nucleus (the coma), they can capture electrons from the neutral species (e.g., H_{2}O, CO_{2}, CO).

The process can be represented as:

X^{q+} + M → X^{(q-1)+}\* + M^{+}

where X^{q+} is a highly charged solar wind ion, M is a neutral cometary molecule, X^{(q-1)+}\* is the resulting ion in an excited state after capturing an electron, and M^{+} is the newly ionized cometary molecule.

The excited ion (X^{(q-1)+}\*) rapidly relaxes to a lower energy state by emitting a photon, typically in the X-ray or extreme ultraviolet (EUV) part of the spectrum. The photon's energy reflects the large energy difference between the ion's states.

Cravens' model successfully explained the observed spectral characteristics and spatial distribution of cometary X-rays. This discovery provided a new tool for studying both cometary atmospheres and the composition (particularly the heavy ion component) of the solar wind. The charge exchange mechanism identified by Cravens is now recognized as an important X-ray emission process in various astrophysical environments, such as planetary atmospheres and the heliosphere.

== Other research ==
Cravens has contributed significantly to other areas of space physics, including:

- Planetary Ionospheres and Magnetospheres: His work includes modeling the ionospheres and magnetospheres of Earth, Mars, Venus, Jupiter, Saturn, Uranus, and Neptune, studying processes like ionization, chemistry, energy transport, and auroral phenomena.
- Mars: He has developed models of the Martian upper atmosphere and ionosphere relevant to understanding atmospheric escape (including water loss) and the evolution of the Martian climate. He was a co-investigator on NASA's MAVEN (Mars Atmosphere and Volatile EvolutioN) mission.* Outer Planets: He has studied auroral processes and atmospheric interactions at Jupiter and Saturn.
- Saturn: Cravens was co-investigator on the Cassini Ion and Neutral Mass Spectrometer (INMS) of the Cassini–Huygens mission to Saturn. This instrument was key in postulating a much younger age for the rings of Saturn than previously thought.

== Awards and recognition ==
- 2018: Fellow of the AAAS
- 2005: Higuchi Award (Higuchi-KU Endowment Research Achievement Award), University of Kansas
- 2003: Editors' Citation for Excellence in Refereeing, AGU (for Journal of Geophysical Research–Space Physics)
- 2001: Fellow of the AGU

== Selected publications ==
Cravens has authored or co-authored numerous publications in space physics and planetary science, including:

- Cravens, T. E. (1997). "Comet Hyakutake x-ray source: Charge transfer of solar wind heavy ions". Geophysical Research Letters. 24 (1): 105–108. Bibcode:1997GeoRL..24..105C. doi:10.1029/96GL03780.
- Cravens, T. E. (1997). Physics of Solar System Plasmas. Cambridge University Press. ISBN 978-0-521-35280-2.
- Kunin, Calvin M. (2001). "Perspectives of a Long-Time Observer". The Journal of Infectious Diseases. 183: S9–S11. doi:10.1086/318856. PMID 11171004.
- Gulkis, Samuel; Allen, Mark; Backus, Charles; Beaudin, Gérard; Biver, Nicolas; Bockelée-Morvan, Dominique; Crovisier, Jacques; Despois, Didier; Encrenaz, Pierre; Frerking, Margaret; Hofstadter, Mark; Hartogh, Paul; Ip, Wing; Janssen, Mike; Kamp, Lucas; Koch, Timothy; Lellouch, Emmanuel; Mann, Ingrid; Muhleman, Duane; Rauer, Heike; Schloerb, Peter; Spilker, Thomas (2007). "Remote sensing of a comet at millimeter and submillimeter wavelengths from an orbiting spacecraft". Planetary and Space Science. 55 (9): 1050–1057. Bibcode:2007P&SS...55.1050G. doi:10.1016/j.pss.2006.11.011.
- Cravens, T.E.; Lindgren, C.J.; Ledvina, S.A. (October 1998). "A two-dimensional multifluid MHD model of Titan's plasma environment". Planetary and Space Science. 46 (9–10): 1193–1205. Bibcode:1998P&SS...46.1193C. doi:10.1016/S0032-0633(98)00051-8.

A more extensive list of publications is available through databases such as NASA Astrophysics Data System. and Google Scholar.
