= Comet McNaught =

Great Comet of 2007

C/2006 P1 (McNaught) (Great Comet of 2007)
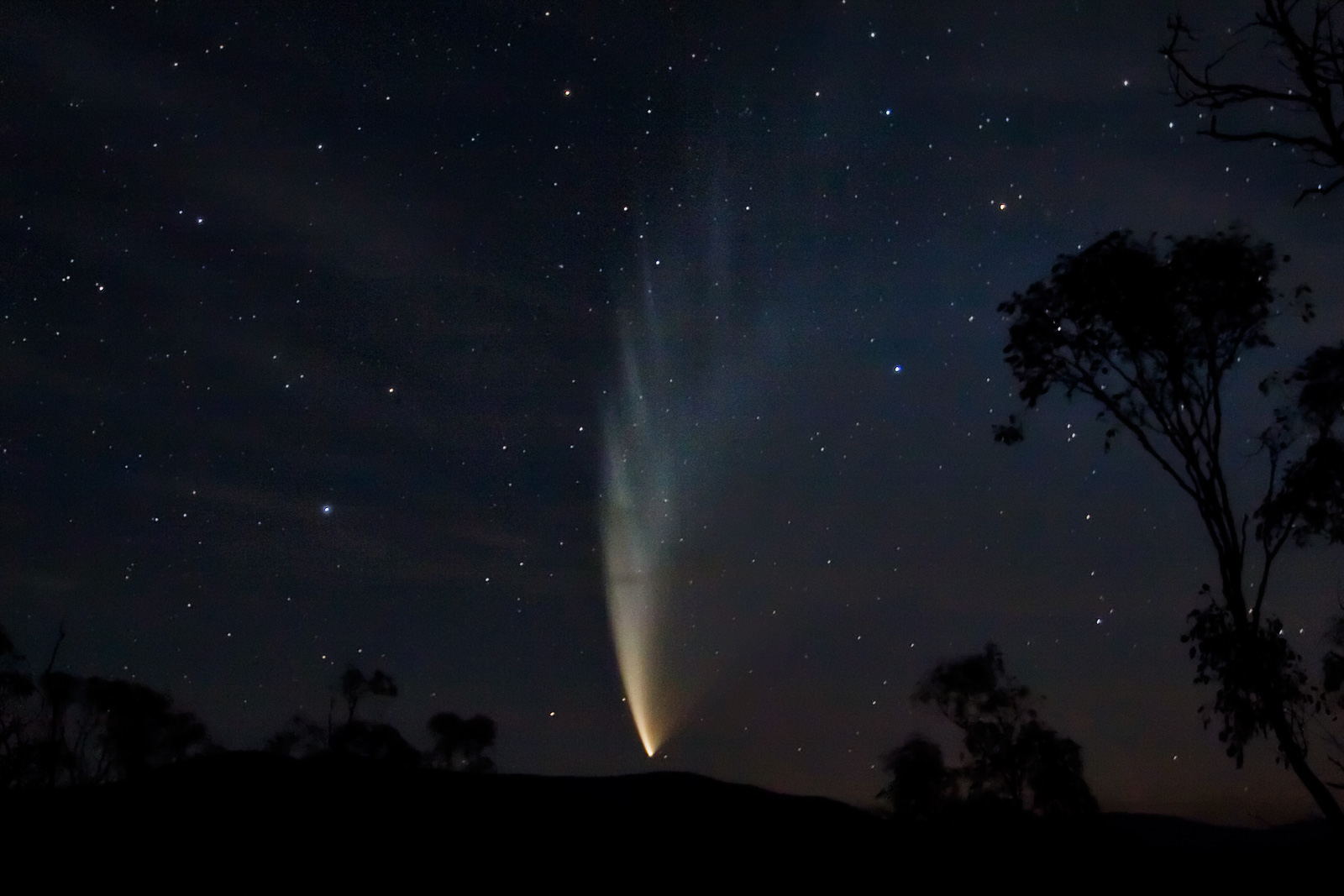
- Comet McNaught as seen from Swift's Creek, Victoria on 23 January 2007

Discovery
- Discovered by: Robert H. McNaught
- Discovery site: Siding Spring Observatory (Uppsala Southern Schmidt Telescope)
- Discovery date: 7 August 2006

Orbital characteristics
- Epoch: 26 November 2006 (JD 2454065.5)
- Observation arc: 338 days
- Number of observations: 331
- Orbit type: Oort cloud
- Aphelion: ~67,000 AU (inbound); ~4,100 AU (outbound)
- Perihelion: 0.171 AU
- Semi-major axis: ~33,000 AU (inbound); ~2,000 AU (outbound)
- Eccentricity: 1.000019 (inbound); 0.99917 (outbound)
- Orbital period: ~6 million years (inbound); ~92,600 years (outbound)
- Max. orbital speed: 101.9 km/s (63.3 mi/s)
- Inclination: 77.837°
- Longitude of ascending node: 267.41°
- Argument of periapsis: 155.97°
- Last perihelion: 12 January 2007
- Earth MOID: 0.409 AU
- Jupiter MOID: 0.316 AU

Physical characteristics
- Mean radius: 1.58 km (0.98 mi) (Note: Calculated mean radius using the formula: $\log_{10}\,(\,R\,)\ =\;0.9 +\;0.13 (\,H\,)$ Where $\,H\,$ is the comet's absolute total magnitude (M1))
- Synodic rotation period: 11.8 hours
- Comet total magnitude (M1): 5.4
- Comet nuclear magnitude (M2): 12.9
- Apparent magnitude: –5.5 (2007 apparition)

Comet McNaught, also known as the Great Comet of 2007 and given the designation C/2006 P1, is a non-periodic comet discovered on 7 August 2006 by British-Australian astronomer Robert H. McNaught using the Uppsala Southern Schmidt Telescope. It was the brightest comet in over 40 years, and was easily visible to the naked eye for observers in the Southern Hemisphere in January and February 2007.

With an estimated peak magnitude of −5.5, the comet was the second-brightest since 1935. Around perihelion on 12 January, it was visible worldwide in broad daylight. Its tail measured an estimated at 74.935 million km (0.501 AU) in length and stretched 35 degrees across the sky at its peak.

The brightness of C/2006 P1 near perihelion was enhanced by forward scattering.

== Discovery ==
McNaught discovered the comet in a CCD image on 7 August 2006 during the course of routine observations for the Siding Spring Survey, which searched for Near-Earth Objects that might represent a collision threat to Earth. The comet was discovered in Ophiuchus, shining very dimly at a magnitude of about +17. From August through November 2006, the comet was imaged and tracked as it moved through Ophiuchus and Scorpius, brightening as high as magnitude +9, still too dim to be seen with the unaided eye. Then, for most of December, the comet was lost in the glare of the Sun.

Upon recovery, it became apparent that the comet was brightening very fast, reaching naked-eye visibility in early January 2007. It was visible to northern hemisphere observers, in Sagittarius and surrounding constellations, until about 13 January. Perihelion was 12 January at a distance of 0.17 AU (25 million km). This was close enough to the Sun to be observed by the space-based Solar and Heliospheric Observatory (SOHO). The comet entered SOHO's LASCO C3 camera's field of view on 12 January, and was viewable on the web in near real-time. The comet left SOHO's field of view on 16 January. Due to its proximity to the Sun, the Northern Hemisphere ground-based viewers had a short window for viewing, and the comet could be spotted only during bright twilight.

As it reached perihelion on 12 January, it became the brightest comet since Comet Ikeya–Seki in 1965. The comet was dubbed the Great Comet of 2007 by Space.com. On 13 and 14 January 2007, the comet attained an estimated maximum apparent magnitude of −5.5. It was bright enough to be visible in daylight about 5°–10° southeast of the Sun from 12 to 14 January. The closest approach to the Earth occurred on 15 January 2007, at a distance of 0.82 AU.

After passing the Sun, McNaught became visible in the Southern Hemisphere. In Australia, according to Siding Spring Observatory at Coonabarabran, where the comet was discovered, it was to have reached its theoretical peak in brightness on Sunday 14 January just after sunset, when it would have been visible for 23 minutes. On 15 January the comet was observed at Perth Observatory with an estimated apparent magnitude of −4.0.

== Exploration ==
Animation of Ulysses' trajectory from 6 October 1990 to 29 June 2009 Ulysses · Earth · Jupiter · C/2006 P1 · C/1996 B2 · C/1999 T1

The Ulysses spacecraft made an unexpected pass through the tail of the comet on 3 February 2007. Evidence of the encounter was published in the 1 October 2007 issue of The Astrophysical Journal. Ulysses flew through McNaught's ion tail 260 million km (1.7 AU) from the comet's core and instrument readings showed that there was "complex chemistry" in the region.

The Solar Wind Ion Composition Spectrometer (SWICS) aboard Ulysses measured Comet McNaught's tail composition and detected unexpected ions. It was the first time that O^{3+} oxygen ions were detected near a comet. This suggested that the solar wind ions, which did not originally have most of their electrons, gained some electrons while passing through the comet's atmosphere.

SWICS also measured the speed of the solar wind, and found that even at 260 million kilometres (160 million miles) from the comet's nucleus, the tail had slowed the solar wind to half its normal speed. The solar wind should usually be about 700 km (430 mi) per second at that distance from the Sun, but inside the comet's ion tail, it was less than 401 km (249 mi) per second.

This was very surprising to me. Way past the orbit of Mars, the solar wind felt the disturbance of this little comet. It will be a serious challenge for us theoreticians and computer modellers to figure out the physics

— Michael Combi,

Prof. George Gloeckler, the principal investigator on the Solar Wind Ion Composition Spectrometer (SWICS), said the discovery was important as the composition of comets told them about conditions approximately 4.5 billion years ago when the Solar System was formed.

Here we got a direct sample of this ancient material which gives us the best information on cometary composition. We're still in the process of figuring out what it tells us. We're contributing part of the whole puzzle. The benefits of such an observation are important. They constrain the interactions of such comets with the Sun, including how the comets lose mass. They also examine the question of how a sudden injection of neutral and cold material interacts with hot solar-like plasmas. That occurs in other places of the universe and we were able to study it right here

— Thomas Zurbuchen,

== Orbit ==
Comet C/2006 P1 took millions of years coming directly from the Oort cloud. It follows a hyperbolic trajectory (with an osculating eccentricity larger than 1) during its passage through the inner Solar System, but the eccentricity will drop below 1 after it leaves the influence of the planets and it will remain bound to the Solar System as an Oort cloud comet.

Given the orbital eccentricity of this object, different epochs can generate quite different heliocentric unperturbed two-body best-fit solutions to the aphelion distance (maximum distance) of this object.^{[b]} For objects at such high eccentricity, the Sun's barycentric coordinates are more stable than heliocentric coordinates. Using JPL Horizons, the barycentric orbital elements for epoch 2050 generate a semi-major axis of 2050 AU and a period of approximately 92,700 years.

== Physical characteristics ==
=== Rotation period ===
Studies in 2010 revealed that the observed striae on Comet McNaught's tail was likely caused by three local active domains on its nucleus where there is increased outflow of material as it rotates, initially calculated to be happening every 21 hours. Morphological analysis through narrowband imaging taken from the La Silla Observatory in Chile revealed that McNaught has a faster rotational period of 11.8 hours.

== Gallery ==
Images of Comet McNaught in January 2007

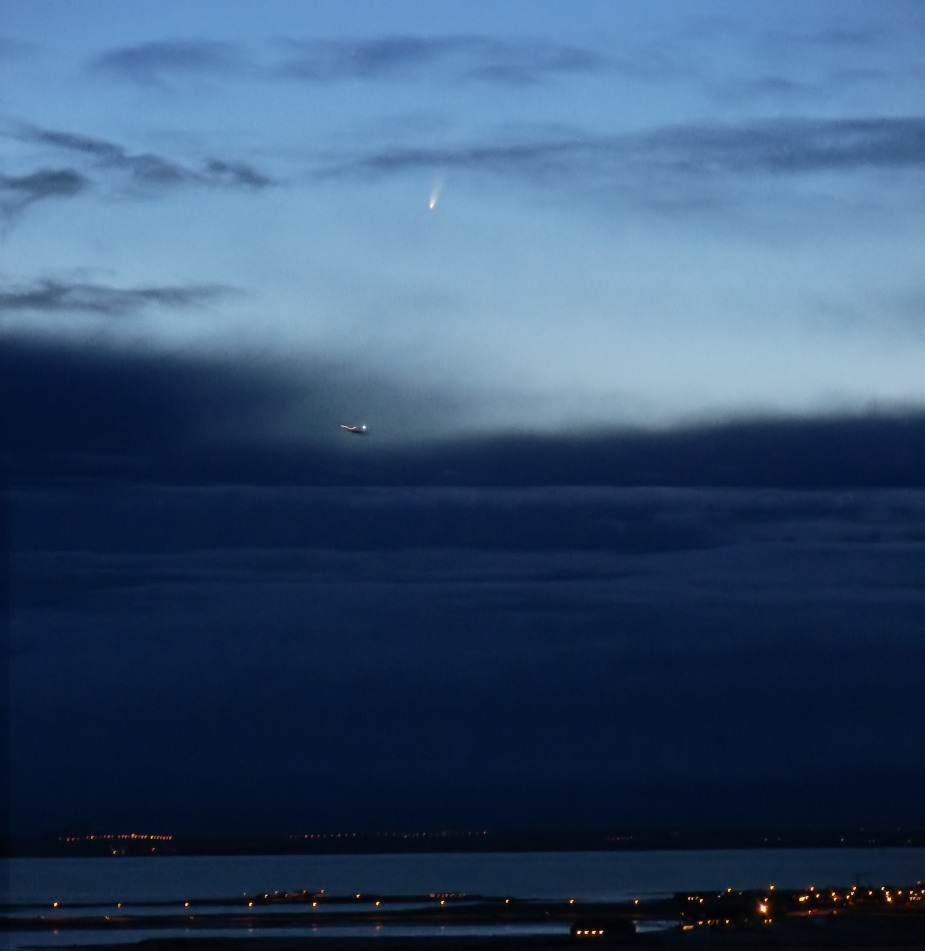
Over Iceland on 9 January

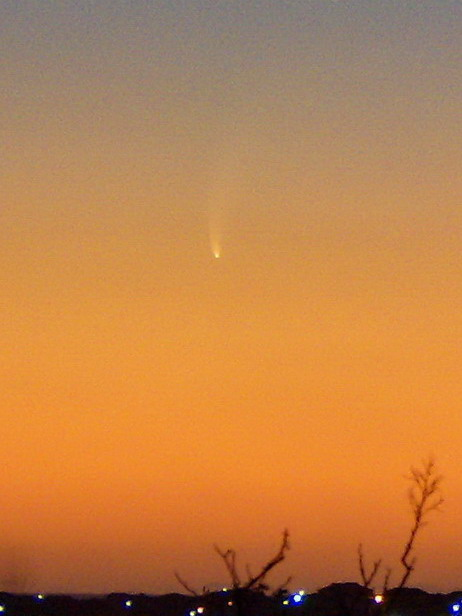
Just after sunset from Perth, Western Australia on 16 January

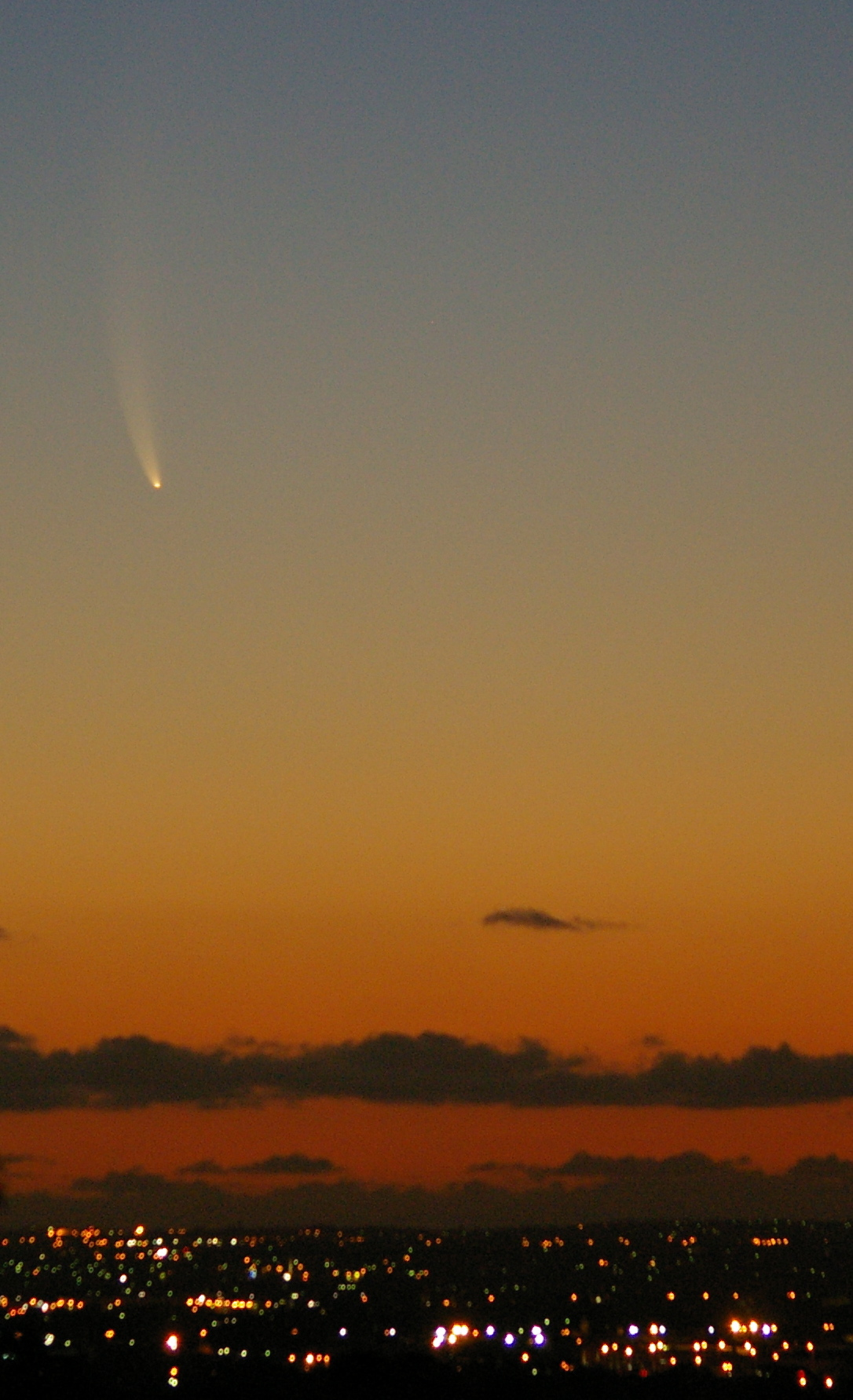
Over Perth, Western Australia at 9 p.m. on 17 January

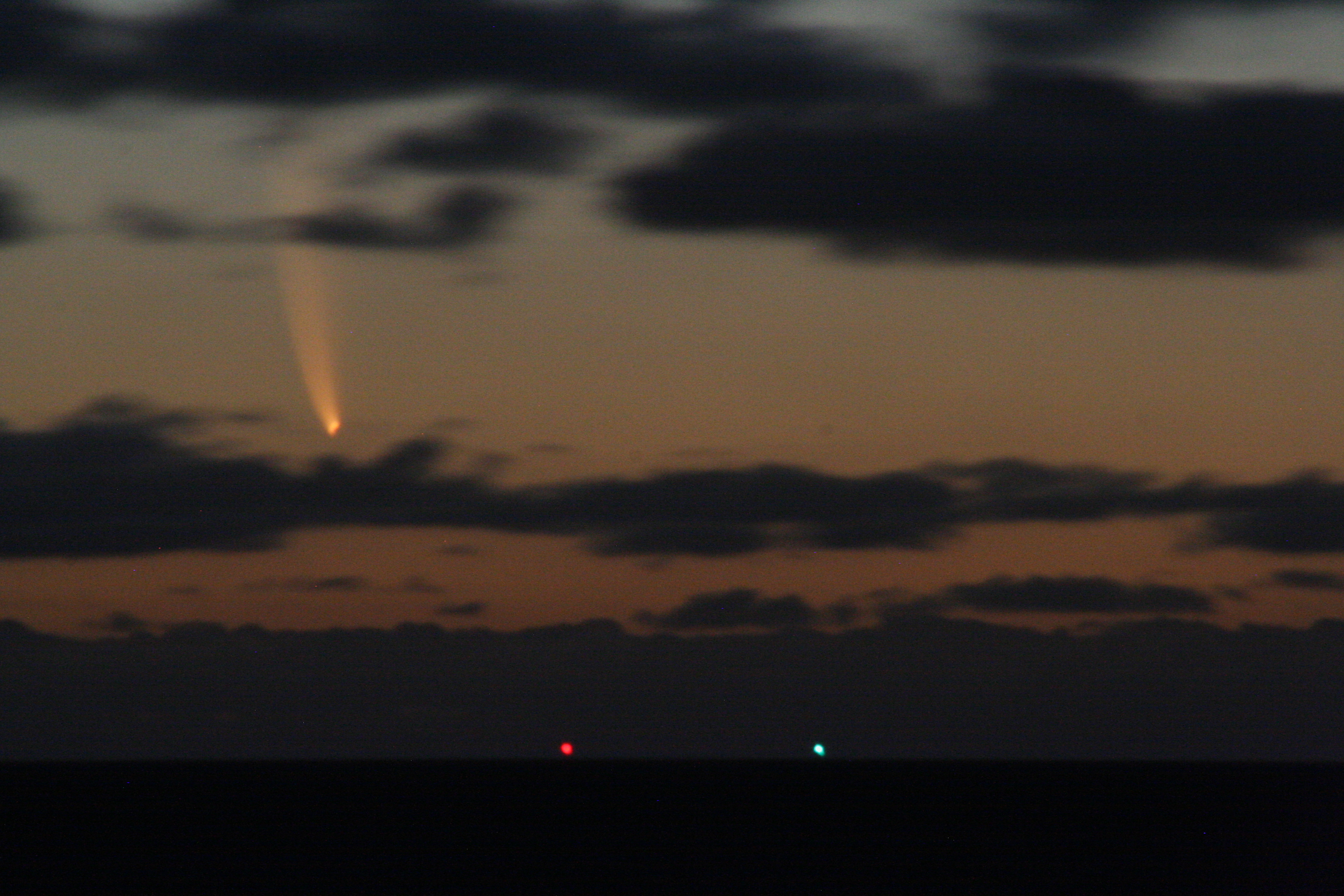
Seen from South Beach, Fremantle, Western Australia on 17 January. The lights at the bottom are navigation lights in Gage Roads.

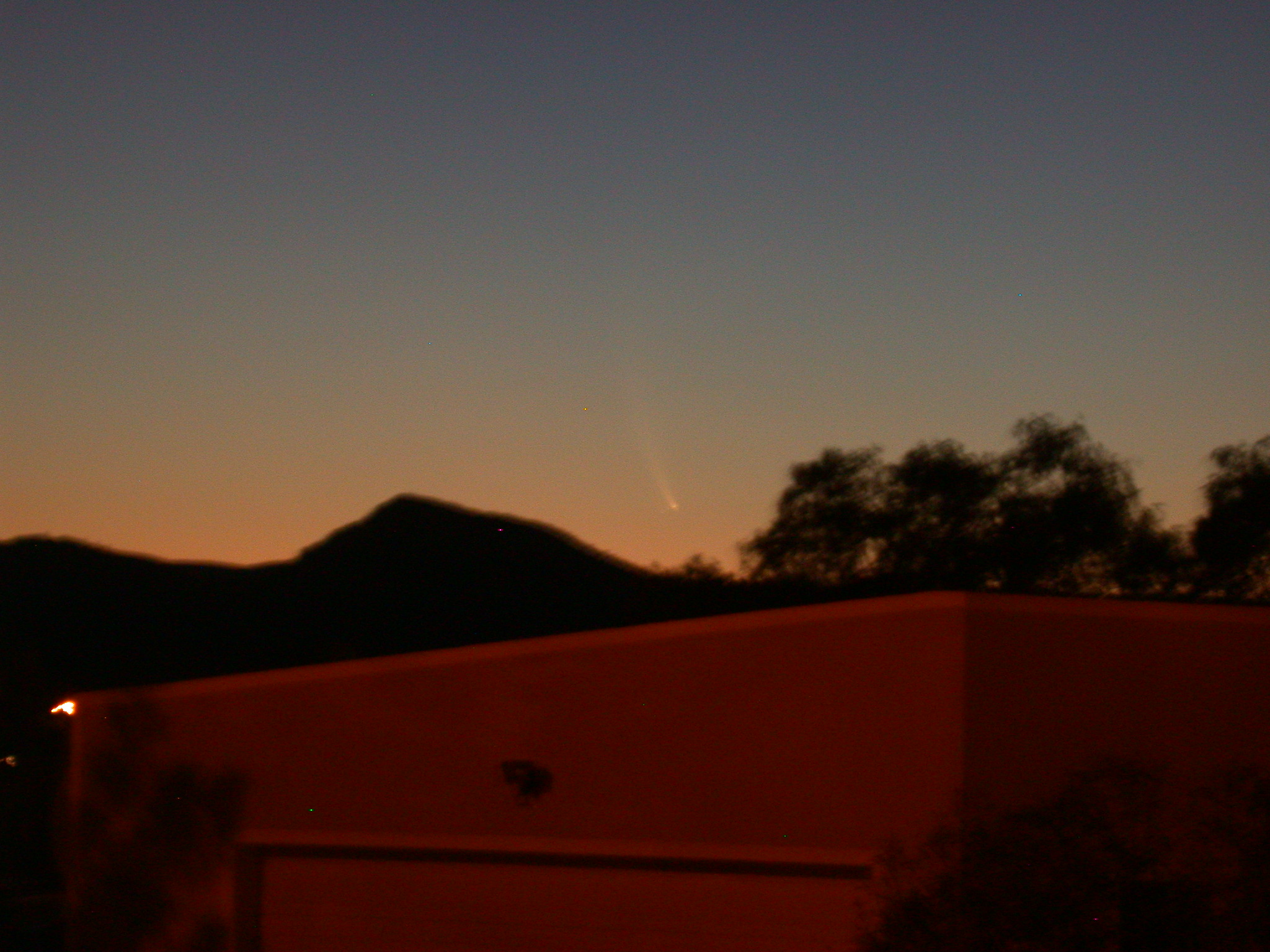
Windhoek, Namibia on 17 January at 8 p.m. local time

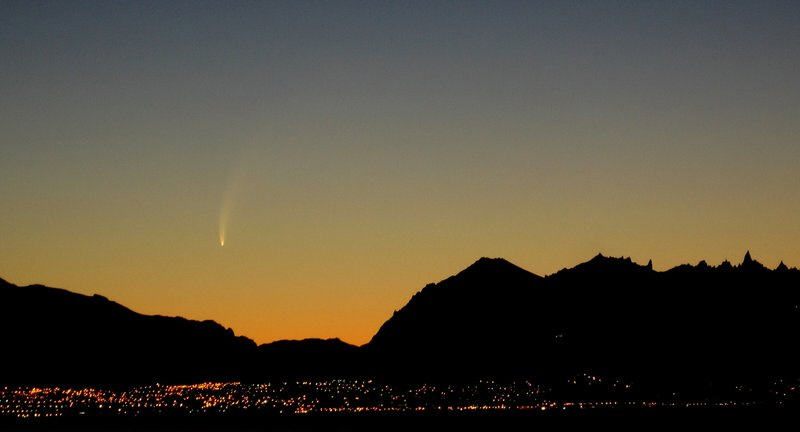
Setting behind the Andes, at Bariloche, Argentina, on 17 January

18 January from Pukekohe, New Zealand

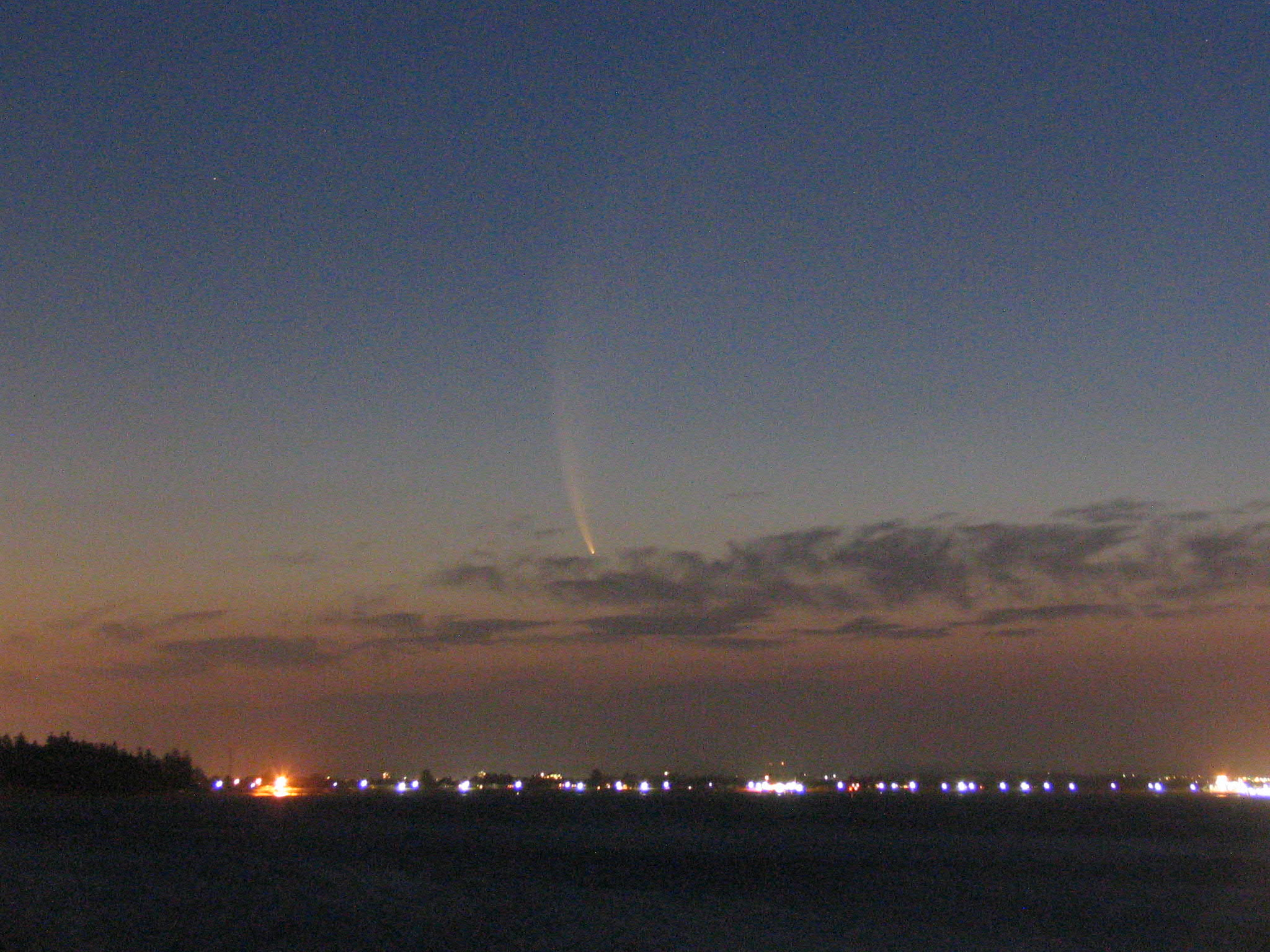
19 January from La Perouse, Sydney, Australia

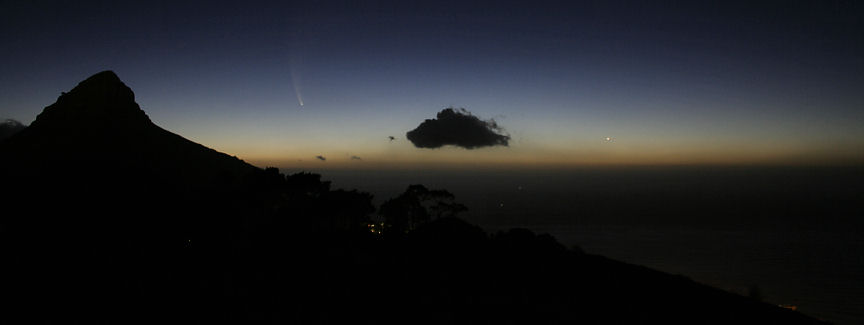
From Signal Hill, Cape Town on 19 January. The silhouette of Lion's Head is visible on the left, while on the right Venus sets over the Atlantic Ocean.

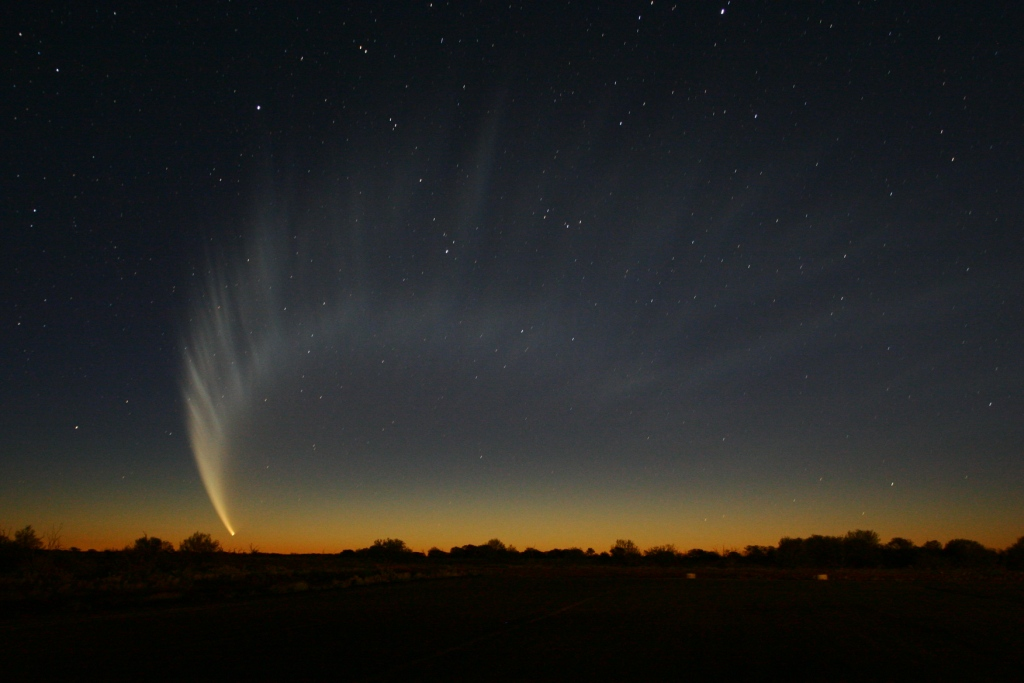
20 January from Lawlers, Western Australia

Villa Alemana Region of Valparaíso, Chile on 20 January

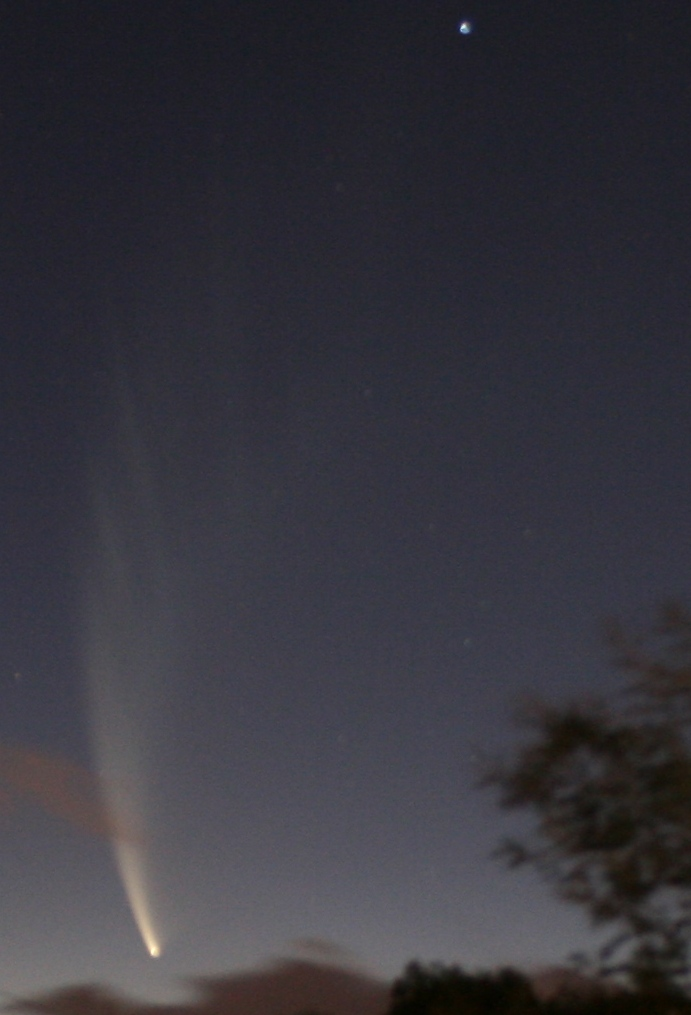
from Red Hill, Canberra on 21 January

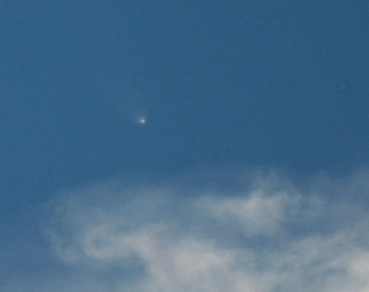
Comet McNaught in broad daylight while it was visible by naked eye. Taken on 13 January at 14:00 UTC in Gais, Switzerland.

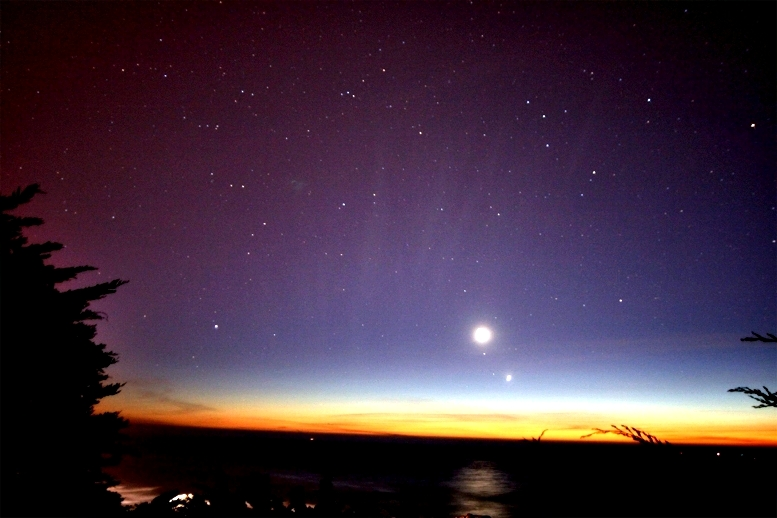
The tail of the comet Comet McNaught was still seen in the Northern Hemisphere after the comet itself was long gone. The picture also shows the Moon and Venus.

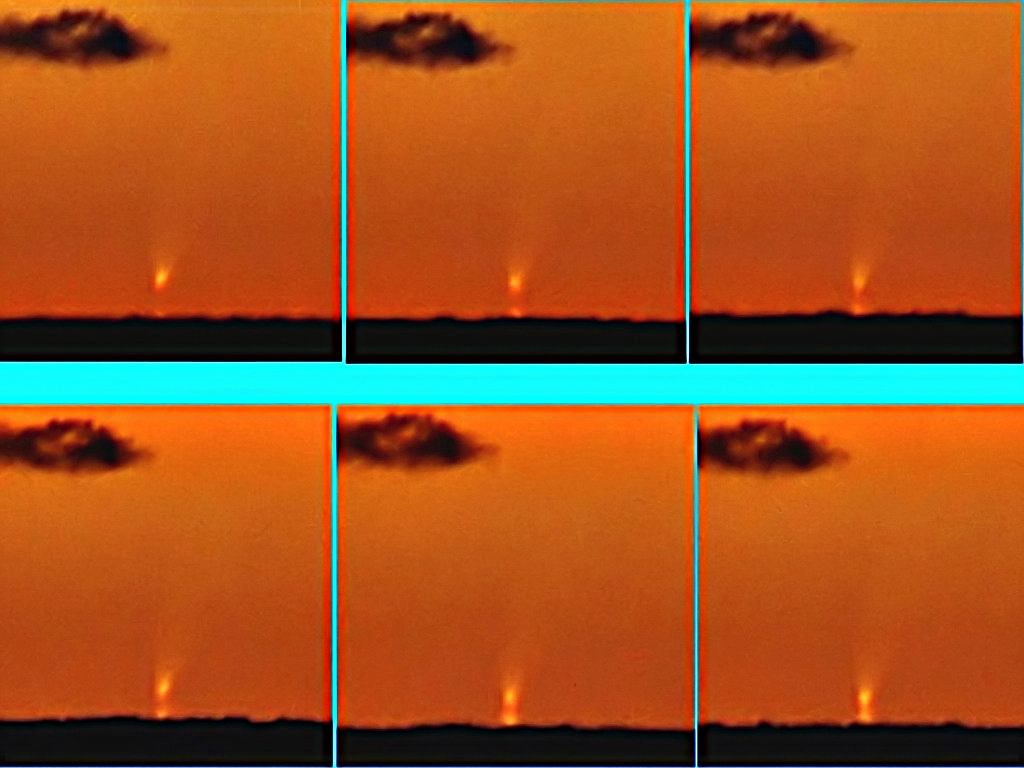
A very rare sequence of the inferior Mirage of the comet set

== See also ==
- Great Comet of 1744
- Great Comet of 1882
- C/1858 L1 (Donati)
- C/1965 S1 (Ikeya–Seki)
- C/2024 G3 (ATLAS)
