= C/1999 S4 (LINEAR) =

Hyperbolic comet

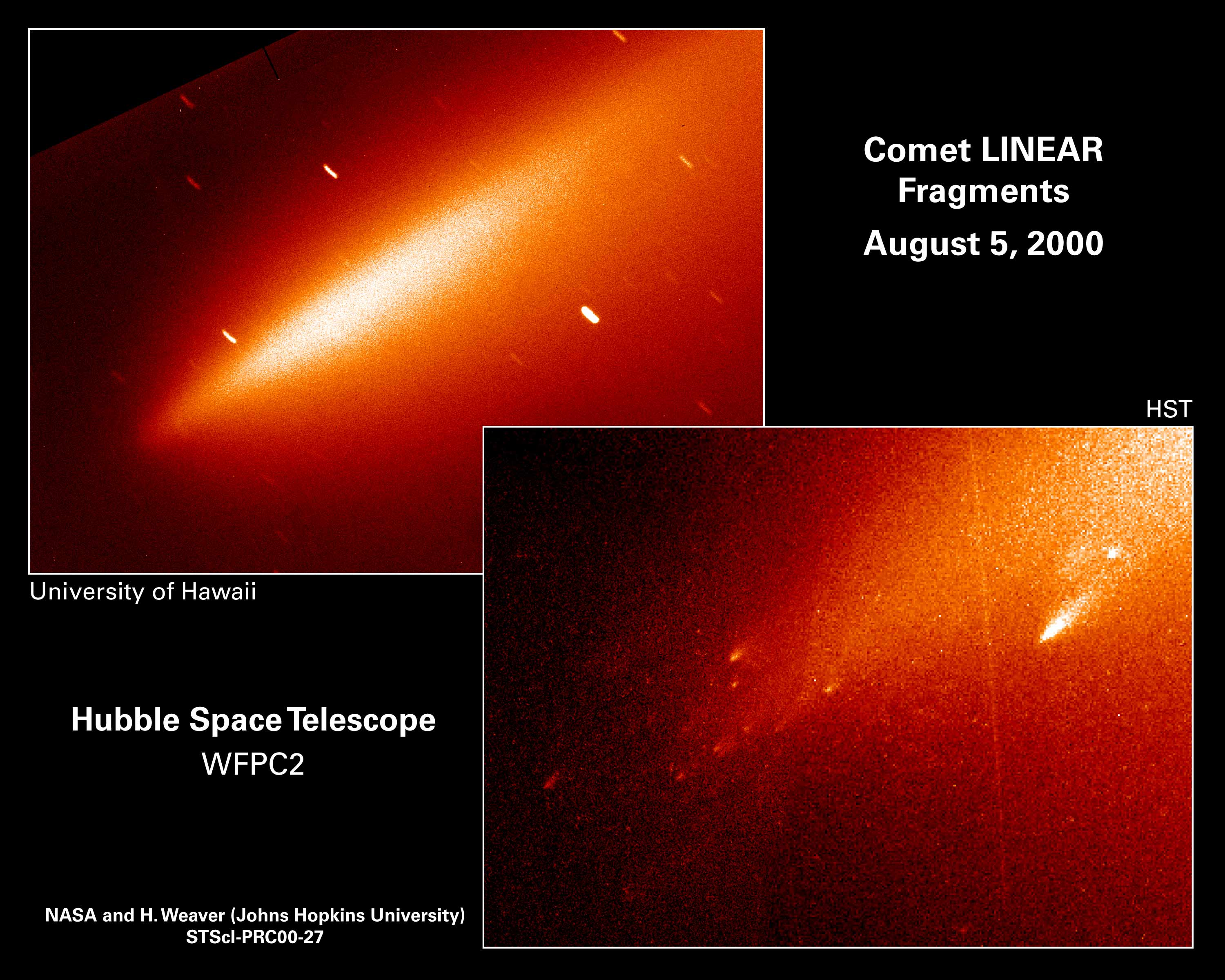
- Hubble image of C/1999 S4 disintegrating on 5 August 2000

Discovery
- Discovered by: LINEAR (704)
- Discovery site: Socorro, New Mexico
- Discovery date: 27 September 1999

Designations
- Alternative designations: CJ99S040

Orbital characteristics
- Epoch: 13 February 2000 (JD 2451587.5)
- Observation arc: 300 days
- Number of observations: 1,230
- Aphelion: ~1400 AU
- Perihelion: 0.765 AU
- Semi-major axis: ~700 AU
- Eccentricity: 1.00010
- Orbital period: ~18,700 years
- Inclination: 149.38°
- Longitude of ascending node: 83.181°
- Argument of periapsis: 151.05°
- Last perihelion: 26 July 2000
- Earth MOID: 0.174 AU
- Jupiter MOID: 0.802 AU

Physical characteristics
- Mean diameter: 0.9 km (0.56 mi)
- Mean density: 410 kg/m^{3}
- Synodic rotation period: 5.2±0.3 hours
- Comet total magnitude (M1): 9.6
- Apparent magnitude: 6.6–6.8 (2000 apparition)

C/1999 S4 (LINEAR) was a hyperbolic comet discovered by the Lincoln Near-Earth Asteroid Research survey on 27 September 1999.

== Physical characteristics ==
Its nucleus was estimated to be about 0.9 km (0.56 mi) in diameter. Before the comet broke up, the (dust and water) nucleus erosion rate was about 1 cm per day. The comet brightened near 5 July 2000, and underwent a minor fragmentation event. The comet brightened again around 20 July 2000, and then disintegrated. The published optical and most radio data support that the main nuclear decay started 23 July 2000. The dust cloud expanded at about 20 m/s (66 ft/s) while the fragments expanded at around 7 m/s (23 ft/s). Other comets are known to have disappeared, but Comet LINEAR is the first one to have been caught in the act.

In addition to H_{2}O, traces of C_{2}H_{6}, CH_{4}, HCN, and CO were detected. Additionally, traces of NH_{3}, C_{2}H_{2}, H_{2}CO, and CH_{3}OH were present.

== Orbit ==
The orbit of a long-period comet is properly obtained when the osculating orbit is computed at an epoch after leaving the planetary region and is calculated with respect to the center of mass of the Solar System. Using JPL Horizons, the barycentric orbital elements for epoch 2010-Jan-01 generate a semi-major axis of 700 AU, an aphelion distance of 1400 AU, and a period of approximately 18,700 years.

The comet made its closest approach to the Earth on 22 July 2000, at a distance of 0.372 AU (55.7 million km). It came to perihelion on 26 July 2000, at a distance of 0.765 AU (114.4 million km) from the Sun.
