= List of Kreutz sungrazers =

Catalog for the largest known group of sungrazing comets

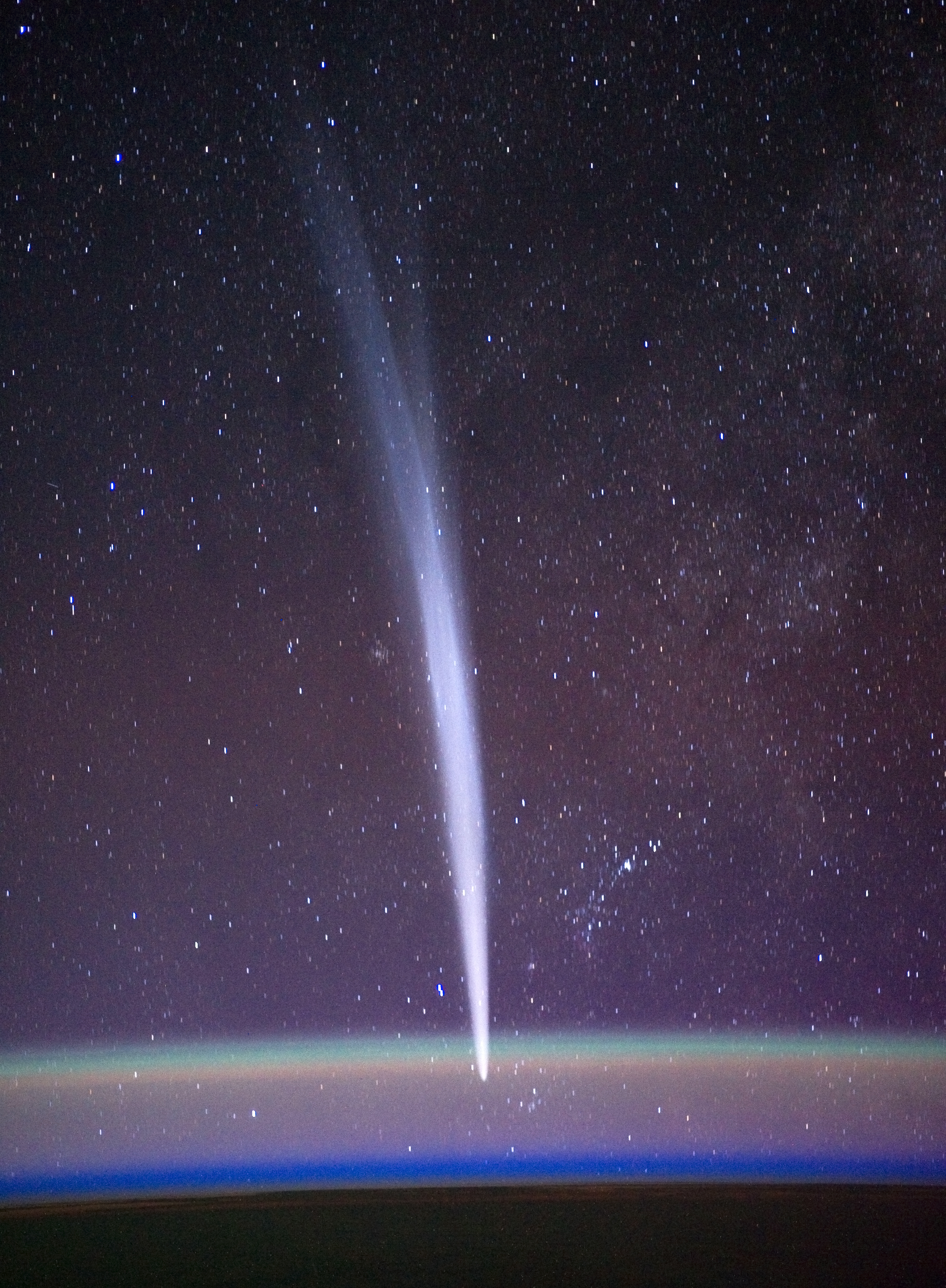
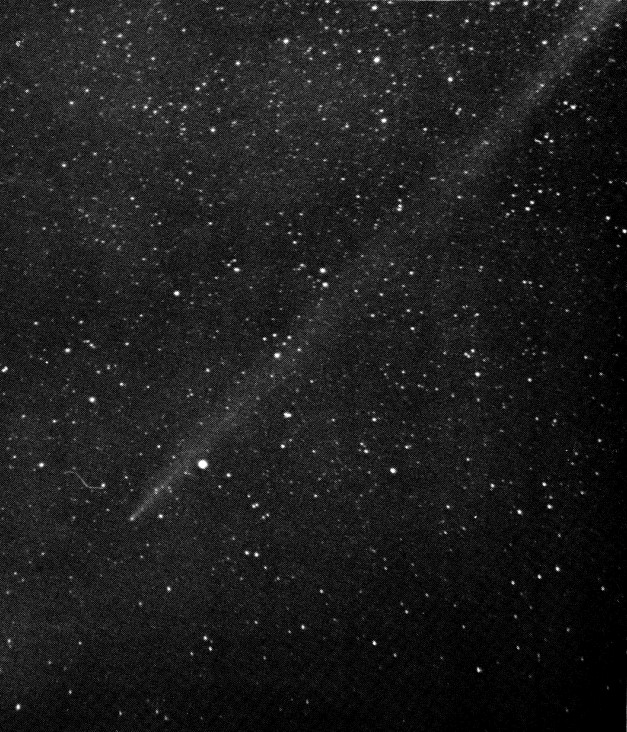
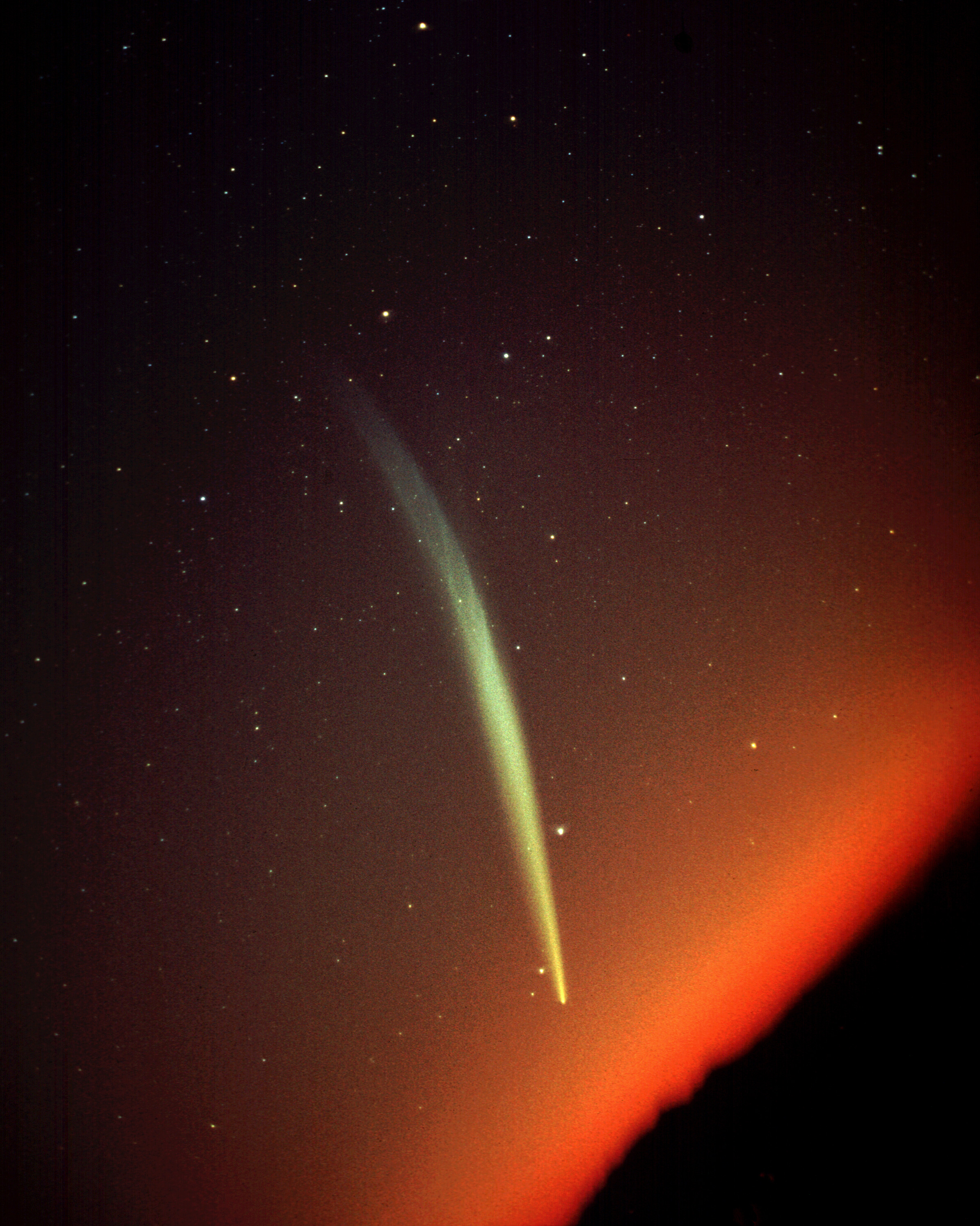
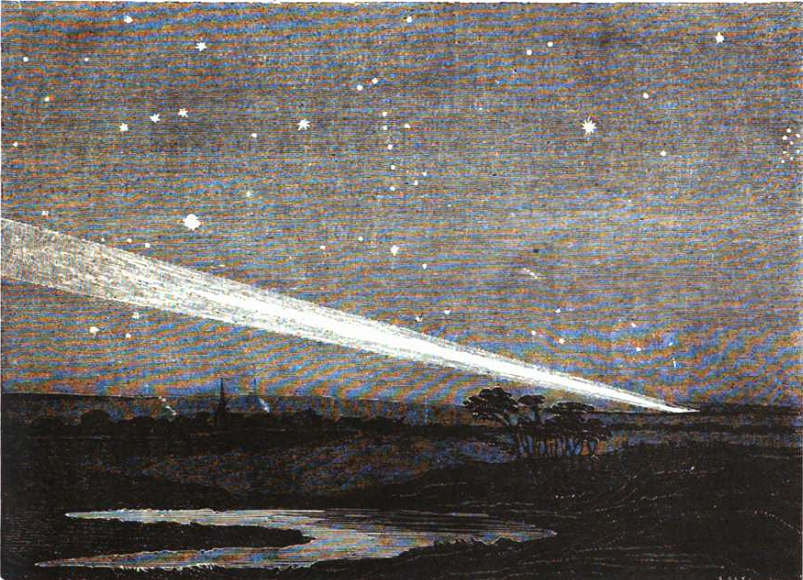
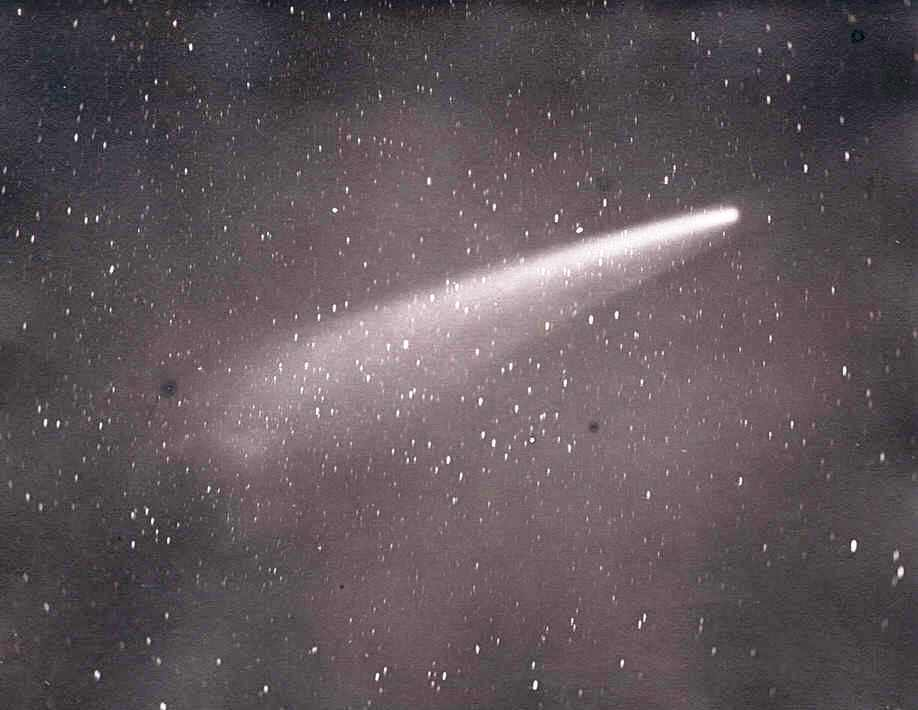
Some of the brightest known Kreutz comets since 1843
(Counter-clockwise direction from top):
- C/2011 W3 (Lovejoy)
- C/1963 R1 (Pereyra)
- C/1843 D1 (Great comet)
- C/1882 R1 (Great comet)
- C/1965 S1 (Ikeya–Seki)

The Kreutz sungrazers are a group of comets descended from the breakup of a comet in about 371 BC. They are typically traveling less than 2 solar radii from the Sun. Because they travel so close, they often burn up. Many bright comets are members of the group, including Comet Ikeya–Seki, which broke in 3 pieces in its 1965 perihelion. The Kreutz sungrazers can be subdivided into several groups- a primary group at inclination ~144° and node ~5, and a secondary, smaller group at inclination ~139° node ~350°. The entire group spans several degrees across in their orbits, and make up a significant portion of the known comets in the Solar System — as of November 2015, about 3000 of the 4000 known comets belong to the Kreutz sungrazers group. Many of these short arc comets are assumed to have an orbital eccentricity of 1.0 because their long-term orbits are poorly constrained.

Kreutz comets discovered through the Solar and Heliospheric Observatory (SOHO) also have their numerical designations included in the list, whether or not they received official designations from the Minor Planet Center. Members that have been observed from the ground and those bright enough to be considered as great comets were also color coded, to further distinguish them from smaller ones only observed by satellites in space.

== Until the 19th century ==
=== Before 1100 ===
Most of the comets listed here were potential members of the Kreutz family that were identified by Ichiro Hasegawa and Katherine Jane England, respectively. Comet names starting with X/ indicate a comet for which no reliable orbit is known.

| Comet designation | Name/ discoverer(s) | Period (years) | e | a (AU) | q (AU) | i (°) | Node (°) | Perihelion date |
|---|---|---|---|---|---|---|---|---|
| X/-371 | Great Comet of 371 BC | 788.61 | 0.99992 | – | 0.007 | 141.32 | 345.43 | -371/01/20 |
| X/110 A1 | – | – | 1.0 | – | – | – | – | 110/01/15 |
| X/133 | – | – | 1.0 | – | – | – | – | 133/01/20 |
| X/191 | Great Comet of 191 AD | – | 1.0 | – | – | – | – | 191/09/15 |
| X/193 | – | – | 1.0 | – | – | – | – | 193/04/15 |
| X/252 F1 | – | – | 1.0 | – | – | – | – | 252/03/25 |
| X/254 | – | – | 1.0 | – | – | – | – | 254/11/15 |
| X/283 H1 | – | – | 1.0 | – | – | – | – | 283/04/22 |
| X/302 J1 | – | – | 1.0 | – | – | – | – | 302/05/15 |
| X/349 W1 | Great Comet of 349 AD | – | 1.0 | – | – | – | – | 349/11/23 |
| X/363 | Great Daylight Comet of 363 AD | 864.98 | 0.99991 | – | 0.008 | 140.39 | 341.77 | 363/11/15 |
| X/501 C1 | – | – | 1.0 | – | – | – | – | 501/02/13 |
| X/501 G1 | – | – | 1.0 | – | – | – | – | 501/04/14 |
| X/560 T1 | – | – | 1.0 | – | – | – | – | 560/10/04 |
| X/676 A1 | – | – | 1.0 | – | – | – | – | 676/01/03 |
| X/815 G1 | – | – | 1.0 | – | – | – | – | 815/04/15 |
| X/840 X1 | – | – | 1.0 | – | – | – | – | 840/12/03 |

=== 1100s to 1700s ===
| Comet designation | Name/ discoverer(s) | Period (years) | e | a (AU) | q (AU) | i (°) | Node (°) | Perihelion date |
|---|---|---|---|---|---|---|---|---|
| X/1106 C1 | Great Comet of 1106 | 748.04 | 0.99994 | – | 0.005 | 144.54 | 5.82 | 1106/01/26 |
| X/1138 | – | 754.41 | 0.9999 | – | 0.008 | 141.35 | 344.67 | 1138/08/01 |
| X/1529 C1 | – | – | 1.0 | – | – | – | – | 1529/02/05 |
| C/1618 V1 | – | – | 1.0 | – | 0.007 | 143 | 347.33 | 1618/11/08 |
| C/1668 E1 | Great Comet of 1668 | – | 1.0 | – | 0.067 | 144.38 | 3.215 | 1668/02/28 |
| C/1689 X1 | – | – | 1.0 | – | 0.064 | 63.204 | 283.75 | 1689/11/30 |
| X/1702 D1 | – | – | 1.0 | – | – | – | – | 1702 |

=== 1800s ===
| Comet designation | Name/ discoverer(s) | Period (years) | e | a (AU) | q (AU) | i (°) | Node (°) | Perihelion date |
|---|---|---|---|---|---|---|---|---|
| C/1843 D1 | Great Comet of 1843 | 513 | 0.999914 | 64.267 | 0.005527 | 144.3548 | 3.5272 | 1843/02/27 |
| C/1880 C1 | Great Southern Comet of 1880 | – | 1.0 | – | 0.005494 | 144.6666 | 7.7774 | 1880/01/28 |
| X/1882 K1 | Tewfik | – | 1.0 | – | 0.0053 | 144.5 | 7.69 | 1882/05/17 |
| C/1882 R1-A | Great September Comet of 1882 | 669 | 0.999899 | 76.7327 | 0.00775 | 142.0112 | 347.6563 | 1882/09/17 |
| C/1882 R1-B | Great September Comet of 1882 | 759 | 0.999907 | 83.3441 | 0.007751 | 142.0111 | 347.6566 | 1882/09/17 |
| C/1882 R1-C | Great September Comet of 1882 | 874 | 0.999915 | 91.1882 | 0.007751 | 142.0105 | 347.6545 | 1882/09/17 |
| C/1882 R1-D | Great September Comet of 1882 | 952 | 0.99992 | 96.8625 | 0.007749 | 142.0093 | 347.651 | 1882/09/17 |
| C/1887 B1 | Great Southern Comet of 1887 | – | 1.0 | – | 0.00483 | 144.383 | 4.585 | 1887/01/11 |

== 20th century ==
=== 1900 to 1979 ===
| Comet designation | Name/ discoverer(s) | Period (years) | e | a (AU) | q (AU) | i (°) | Node (°) | Perihelion date |
|---|---|---|---|---|---|---|---|---|
| C/1945 X1 | du Toit | – | 1.0 | – | 0.007516 | 141.8734 | 351.2006 | 1945/12/17 |
| C/1963 R1 | Pereyra | 903 | 0.999946 | 93.7963 | 0.005065 | 144.5821 | 7.9393 | 1963/08/23 |
| C/1965 S1-A | Ikeya–Seki | 2845 | 0.999915 | 91.6 | 0.007786 | 141.8642 | 346.9947 | 1965/10/21 |
| C/1965 S1-B | Ikeya–Seki | 1060 | 0.999925 | 103.7067 | 0.007778 | 141.861 | 346.9811 | 1965/10/21 |
| C/1970 K1 | White–Ortiz–Bolelli | – | 1.0 | – | 0.00879 | 139.0714 | 337.0147 | 1970/05/14 |
| C/1979 Q1 | Solwind-1 | – | 1.0 | – | 0.0048 | 141.456 | 344.997 | 1979/08/30 |

=== 1980 to 1995 ===
| Comet designation | Name/ discoverer(s) | Period (years) | e | a (AU) | q (AU) | i (°) | Node (°) | Perihelion date |
|---|---|---|---|---|---|---|---|---|
| C/1981 B1 | Solwind-2 | – | 1.0 | – | 0.00792 | 140.676 | 342.107 | 1981/01/27 |
| C/1981 O1 | Solwind-3 | – | 1.0 | – | 0.00612 | 141.706 | 345.957 | 1981/07/20 |
| C/1981 V1 | Solwind-4 | – | 1.0 | – | 0.0045 | 143.847 | 357.569 | 1981/11/04 |
| C/1981 W1 | Solwind-7 | – | 1.0 | – | 0.0048 | 135.48 | 24.63 | 1981/11/20 |
| C/1983 N2 | Solwind-8 | – | 1.0 | – | 0.0049 | 142.23 | 359.55 | 1983/07/07 |
| C/1983 S2 | Solwind-6 | – | 1.0 | – | 0.00753 | 143.987 | 358.679 | 1983/09/25 |
| C/1984 O2 | Solwind-5 | – | 1.0 | – | 0.01541 | 136.386 | 330.436 | 1984/07/28 |
| C/1984 Q1 | Solwind-9 | – | 1.0 | – | 0.0049 | 144.14 | 355.72 | 1984/08/23 |
| C/1987 T2 | SMM-1 | – | 1.0 | – | 0.00538 | 144.256 | 1.159 | 1987/10/06 |
| C/1987 U4 | SMM-2 | – | 1.0 | – | 0.00627 | 144.466 | 3.66 | 1987/10/18 |
| C/1988 M1 | SMM-3 | – | 1.0 | – | 0.00516 | 144.706 | 7.66 | 1988/06/27 |
| C/1988 Q1 | SMM-4 | – | 1.0 | – | 0.00591 | 144.436 | 3.2 | 1988/08/21 |
| C/1988 T1 | SMM-5 | – | 1.0 | – | 0.00513 | 144.786 | 10.351 | 1988/10/12 |
| C/1988 U1 | SMM-7 | – | 1.0 | – | 0.00579 | 144.716 | 7.981 | 1988/10/24 |
| C/1988 W1 | SMM-6 | – | 1.0 | – | 0.0059 | 144.796 | 14.021 | 1988/11/18 |
| C/1989 L1 | SMM-8 | – | 1.0 | – | 0.00557 | 144.636 | 6.24 | 1989/06/02 |
| C/1989 N3 | SMM-9 | – | 1.0 | – | 0.00462 | 144.786 | 14.902 | 1989/07/08 |
| C/1989 S1 | SMM-10 | – | 1.0 | – | 0.00476 | 144.768 | 9.636 | 1989/09/28 |

=== 1996 ===
Since 1996, the Solar and Heliospheric Observatory (SOHO) had discovered more comets than anyone in history, of which 86% of the approximately 3,100 comets it had discovered (as of 2016) belong to the Kreutz sungrazer family.

| Comet designation | Name/ discoverer(s) | Period (years) | e | a (AU) | q (AU) | i (°) | Node (°) | Perihelion date |
|---|---|---|---|---|---|---|---|---|
| C/1996 A2 | SOHO-342 | – | 1.0 | – | 0.0054 | 141.76 | 6.86 | 1996/01/14 |
| C/1996 B3 | SOHO-9 | – | 1.0 | – | 0.0069 | 144.11 | 347.94 | 1996/01/28 |
| C/1996 B4 | SOHO-351 | – | 1.0 | – | 0.005 | 143.34 | 8 | 1996/01/21 |
| C/1996 B5 | SOHO-352 | – | 1.0 | – | 0.005 | 144.43 | 356.6 | 1996/01/29 |
| – | SOHO-3010 | – | 1.0 | – | – | – | – | 1996/01/29 |
| C/1996 D1 | SOHO-14 | – | 1.0 | – | 0.0069 | 143.7 | 353.75 | 1996/02/19 |
| C/1996 E2 | SOHO-201 | – | 1.0 | – | 0.0055 | 143.84 | 6.11 | 1996/03/11 |
| C/1996 F2 | SOHO-16 | – | 1.0 | – | 0.0051 | 144.43 | 3.57 | 1996/03/25 |
| C/1996 H1 | SOHO-17 | – | 1.0 | – | 0.0052 | 144.43 | 2.99 | 1996/04/30 |
| C/1996 L1 | SOHO-300 | – | 1.0 | – | 0.005 | 143.84 | 12.92 | 1996/06/11 |
| C/1996 L2 | SOHO-817 | – | 1.0 | – | 0.0053 | 143.19 | 333.67 | 1996/06/14 |
| C/1996 M1 | SOHO-18 | – | 1.0 | – | 0.0054 | 144.5 | 3.29 | 1996/06/18 |
| C/1996 M2 | SOHO-20 | – | 1.0 | – | 0.005 | 143.42 | 12.91 | 1996/06/27 |
| C/1996 M3 | SOHO-818 | – | 1.0 | – | 0.0065 | 136.59 | 355.33 | 1996/06/21 |
| C/1996 O1 | SOHO-21 | – | 1.0 | – | 0.0061 | 143.96 | 351.95 | 1996/07/22 |
| C/1996 O2 | SOHO-22 | – | 1.0 | – | 0.0076 | 146.02 | 349.92 | 1996/07/24 |
| C/1996 O3 | SOHO-24 | – | 1.0 | – | 0.0067 | 146.22 | 348.73 | 1996/07/26 |
| C/1996 O4 | SOHO-23 | – | 1.0 | – | 0.007 | 144.43 | 350.31 | 1996/07/28 |
| C/1996 Q2 | SOHO-1 | – | 1.0 | – | 0.0052 | 144.4 | 4.7 | 1996/08/22 |
| C/1996 Q3 | SOHO-2 | – | 1.0 | – | 0.0051 | 144.18 | 5.11 | 1996/08/30 |
| C/1996 R4 | SOHO-354 | – | 1.0 | – | 0.0055 | 144.11 | 356.23 | 1996/09/15 |
| C/1996 R5 | SOHO-1095 | – | 1.0 | – | 0.0053 | 144.3 | 358.52 | 1996/09/04 |
| C/1996 S3 | SOHO-3 | – | 1.0 | – | 0.0059 | 143.9 | 357.32 | 1996/09/23 |
| C/1996 V1 | SOHO-368 | – | 1.0 | – | 0.0078 | 141.98 | 12.3 | 1996/11/28 |
| C/1996 X1 | SOHO-5 | – | 1.0 | – | 0.006 | 144.01 | 7.51 | 1996/12/12 |
| C/1996 X2 | SOHO-4 | – | 1.0 | – | 0.0054 | 143.39 | 1.99 | 1996/12/12 |
| C/1996 Y1 | SOHO-6 | – | 1.0 | – | 0.0055 | 144.24 | 5.48 | 1996/12/23 |
| C/1996 Y2 | SOHO-381 | – | 1.0 | – | 0.0056 | 143.95 | 5.34 | 1996/12/30 |

=== 1997 ===
| Comet designation | Name/ discoverer(s) | Period (years) | e | a (AU) | q (AU) | i (°) | Node (°) | Perihelion date |
|---|---|---|---|---|---|---|---|---|
| C/1997 B2 | SOHO-7 | – | 1.0 | – | 0.007 | 144.82 | 352.68 | 1997/01/26 |
| C/1997 B3 | SOHO-258 | – | 1.0 | – | 0.0071 | 145.11 | 354.29 | 1997/01/22 |
| C/1997 C2 | SOHO-1724 | – | 1.0 | – | 0.0048 | – | – | 1997/02/03 |
| C/1997 E2 | SOHO-903 | – | 1.0 | – | 0.005 | 143.38 | 359.18 | 1997/03/05 |
| C/1997 G3 | SOHO-196 | – | 1.0 | – | 0.005 | 143.18 | 359.49 | 1997/04/04 |
| C/1997 G4 | SOHO-197 | – | 1.0 | – | 0.005 | 144.08 | 358.58 | 1997/04/05 |
| C/1997 G5 | SOHO-198 | – | 1.0 | – | 0.0049 | 143.82 | 358.86 | 1997/04/06 |
| C/1997 G6 | SOHO-200 | – | 1.0 | – | 0.005 | 144.27 | 358.15 | 1997/04/11 |
| C/1997 H3 | SOHO-39 | – | 1.0 | – | 0.0083 | 138.71 | 335.99 | 1997/04/26 |
| C/1997 J3 | SOHO-178 | – | 1.0 | – | 0.0085 | 146.83 | 334.41 | 1997/05/10 |
| C/1997 J4 | SOHO-179 | – | 1.0 | – | 0.0094 | 138.93 | 23.14 | 1997/05/10 |
| C/1997 J5 | SOHO-927 | – | 1.0 | – | 0.0077 | 138.67 | 331 | 1997/05/03 |
| C/1997 K1 | SOHO-10 | – | 1.0 | – | 0.0058 | 143.58 | 1.54 | 1997/06/01 |
| C/1997 K3 | SOHO-182 | – | 1.0 | – | 0.0077 | 144.45 | 4.71 | 1997/05/26 |
| C/1997 K4 | SOHO-185 | – | 1.0 | – | 0.0056 | 142.75 | 12.54 | 1997/06/01 |
| C/1997 K5 | SOHO-181 | – | 1.0 | – | 0.009 | 137.6 | 346.2 | 1997/05/20 |
| C/1997 K6 | SOHO-183 | – | 1.0 | – | 0.0057 | 143.19 | 8.82 | 1997/05/31 |
| C/1997 K7 | SOHO-329 | – | 1.0 | – | 0.0089 | 139.41 | 356.14 | 1997/06/01 |
| C/1997 L3 | SOHO-12 | – | 1.0 | – | 0.0082 | 138.69 | 335.94 | 1997/06/13 |
| C/1997 L4 | SOHO-13 | – | 1.0 | – | 0.0051 | 143.96 | 358.09 | 1997/06/15 |
| C/1997 L5 | SOHO-180 | – | 1.0 | – | 0.008 | 146.13 | 356.96 | 1997/06/12 |
| C/1997 M1 | SOHO-15 | – | 1.0 | – | 0.0086 | 138.64 | 334.34 | 1997/06/30 |
| C/1997 M3 | SOHO-184 | – | 1.0 | – | 0.0056 | 146.1 | 354.23 | 1997/06/28 |
| C/1997 M4 | SOHO-190 | – | 1.0 | – | 0.0063 | 145.98 | 331.22 | 1997/06/18 |
| C/1997 M5 | SOHO-299 | – | 1.0 | – | 0.0059 | 127.42 | 351.32 | 1997/06/20 |
| C/1997 N3 | SOHO-199 | – | 1.0 | – | 0.0059 | 142.75 | 2.61 | 1997/07/04 |
| C/1997 O3 | SOHO-1096 | – | 1.0 | – | 0.0053 | 141.45 | 16.19 | 1997/08/01 |
| C/1997 P1 | SOHO-19 | – | 1.0 | – | 0.0055 | 144.35 | 5.46 | 1997/08/05 |
| C/1997 P3 | SOHO-38 | – | 1.0 | – | 0.0067 | 139.35 | 340.57 | 1997/08/08 |
| C/1997 P4 | SOHO-920 | – | 1.0 | – | 0.0096 | 145.97 | 355.21 | 1997/08/08 |
| C/1997 P5 | SOHO-921 | – | 1.0 | – | 0.0051 | 141.36 | 352.3 | 1997/08/09 |
| C/1997 Q1 | SOHO-26 | – | 1.0 | – | 0.0078 | 144.13 | 356.4 | 1997/09/01 |
| C/1997 Q2 | SOHO-25 | – | 1.0 | – | 0.0048 | 144.16 | 9.41 | 1997/08/24 |
| C/1997 R1 | SOHO-27 | – | 1.0 | – | 0.0063 | 144.03 | 356.27 | 1997/09/08 |
| C/1997 R2 | SOHO-28 | – | 1.0 | – | 0.0054 | 144.01 | 358.49 | 1997/09/15 |
| C/1997 R3 | SOHO-29 | – | 1.0 | – | 0.0054 | 144.45 | 4 | 1997/09/17 |
| C/1997 S1 | SOHO-30 | – | 1.0 | – | 0.0074 | 144.01 | 359.58 | 1997/09/30 |
| C/1997 S2 | SOHO-40 | – | 1.0 | – | 0.0078 | 143.81 | 358.73 | 1997/09/26 |
| C/1997 S3 | SOHO-274 | – | 1.0 | – | 0.0053 | 146.05 | 2.78 | 1997/09/24 |
| C/1997 S5 | SOHO-922 | – | 1.0 | – | 0.0058 | 143.79 | 6.57 | 1997/09/20 |
| C/1997 S6 | SOHO-1725 | – | 1.0 | – | 0.0051 | – | – | 1997/09/21 |
| C/1997 T2 | SOHO-31 | – | 1.0 | – | 0.0044 | 144.58 | 3.76 | 1997/10/04 |
| C/1997 T4 | SOHO-32 | – | 1.0 | – | 0.0058 | 144.63 | 4.35 | 1997/10/06 |
| C/1997 T5 | SOHO-33 | – | 1.0 | – | 0.0051 | 143.67 | 359.77 | 1997/10/07 |
| C/1997 T6 | SOHO-218 | – | 1.0 | – | 0.005 | 144.4 | 4.75 | 1997/10/02 |
| C/1997 T7 | SOHO-219 | – | 1.0 | – | 0.0051 | 144.64 | 4.16 | 1997/10/08 |
| C/1997 T8 | SOHO-220 | – | 1.0 | – | 0.0052 | 142.27 | 3.31 | 1997/10/09 |
| C/1997 T9 | SOHO-1902 | – | 1.0 | – | – | – | – | 1997/10/01 |
| C/1997 U1 | SOHO-41 | – | 1.0 | – | 0.0052 | 130.65 | 317.55 | 1997/10/29 |
| C/1997 U2 | SOHO-222 | – | 1.0 | – | 0.0051 | 143.79 | 359 | 1997/10/17 |
| C/1997 U3 | SOHO-223 | – | 1.0 | – | 0.0052 | 144.43 | 7.91 | 1997/10/20 |
| C/1997 U4 | SOHO-224 | – | 1.0 | – | 0.005 | 145.62 | 358.73 | 1997/10/22 |
| C/1997 U5 | SOHO-225 | – | 1.0 | – | 0.0051 | 142.93 | 2.87 | 1997/10/27 |
| C/1997 U6 | SOHO-226 | – | 1.0 | – | 0.0051 | 143.65 | 2.12 | 1997/10/27 |
| C/1997 U7 | SOHO-227 | – | 1.0 | – | 0.0051 | 144.23 | 6.94 | 1997/10/28 |
| C/1997 V2 | SOHO-34 | – | 1.0 | – | 0.0067 | 143.89 | 6.11 | 1997/11/09 |
| C/1997 V3 | SOHO-229 | – | 1.0 | – | 0.0075 | 136.47 | 323.19 | 1997/11/02 |
| C/1997 V4 | SOHO-230 | – | 1.0 | – | 0.005 | 144.1 | 3.37 | 1997/11/03 |
| C/1997 V5 | SOHO-231 | – | 1.0 | – | 0.0085 | 138.34 | 342.67 | 1997/11/08 |
| C/1997 V6 | SOHO-232 | – | 1.0 | – | 0.0054 | 144.37 | 356.55 | 1997/11/09 |
| C/1997 V8 | SOHO-1101 | – | 1.0 | – | 0.008 | 134.4 | 331.9 | 1997/11/07 |
| C/1997 W1 | SOHO-35 | – | 1.0 | – | 0.0055 | 144.52 | 4.09 | 1997/11/23 |
| C/1997 W2 | SOHO-42 | – | 1.0 | – | 0.005 | 142.35 | 12.75 | 1997/11/20 |
| C/1997 W3 | SOHO-334 | – | 1.0 | – | 0.0073 | 138.77 | 22.77 | 1997/11/25 |
| C/1997 X1 | SOHO-36 | – | 1.0 | – | 0.0051 | 143.91 | 359.01 | 1997/12/03 |
| C/1997 X3 | SOHO-233 | – | 1.0 | – | 0.0055 | 144.57 | 0.23 | 1997/12/03 |
| C/1997 X4 | SOHO-234 | – | 1.0 | – | 0.0054 | 142.93 | 6.09 | 1997/12/03 |
| C/1997 X5 | SOHO-235 | – | 1.0 | – | 0.0058 | 145.46 | 355.15 | 1997/12/08 |
| C/1997 X6 | SOHO-237 | – | 1.0 | – | 0.0066 | 146.21 | 351.41 | 1997/12/10 |
| C/1997 Y1 | SOHO-239 | – | 1.0 | – | 0.0054 | 141.83 | 3.55 | 1997/12/21 |
| C/1997 Y2 | SOHO-240 | – | 1.0 | – | 0.0054 | 143.32 | 9.52 | 1997/12/21 |
| C/1997 Y3 | SOHO-241 | – | 1.0 | – | 0.0066 | 146.84 | 348.04 | 1997/12/23 |

=== 1998 ===
| Comet designation | Name/ discoverer(s) | Period (years) | e | a (AU) | q (AU) | i (°) | Node (°) | Perihelion date |
|---|---|---|---|---|---|---|---|---|
| C/1998 A1 | SOHO-37 | – | 1.0 | – | 0.0054 | 144.12 | 7.13 | 1998/01/13 |
| C/1998 B2 | SOHO-254 | – | 1.0 | – | 0.0049 | 142.62 | 359.53 | 1998/01/26 |
| C/1998 D1 | SOHO-1726 | – | 1.0 | – | 0.0050 | – | – | 1998/02/27 |
| C/1998 E1 | SOHO-43 | – | 1.0 | – | 0.0053 | 142.71 | 9.27 | 1998/03/03 |
| C/1998 F1 | SOHO-44 | – | 1.0 | – | 0.0095 | 138.61 | 339.82 | 1998/03/22 |
| C/1998 F2 | SOHO-202 | – | 1.0 | – | 0.005 | 146.06 | 351.17 | 1998/03/28 |
| C/1998 G2 | SOHO-45 | – | 1.0 | – | 0.0049 | 146.08 | 354.6 | 1998/04/02 |
| C/1998 G4 | SOHO-47 | – | 1.0 | – | 0.0092 | 139.59 | 338.58 | 1998/04/11 |
| C/1998 G5 | SOHO-186 | – | 1.0 | – | 0.005 | 144.4 | 359.89 | 1998/04/06 |
| C/1998 G6 | SOHO-187 | – | 1.0 | – | 0.0053 | 144.82 | 7.71 | 1998/04/07 |
| C/1998 G7 | SOHO-188 | – | 1.0 | – | 0.0079 | 143.52 | 356.63 | 1998/04/07 |
| C/1998 G8 | SOHO-192 | – | 1.0 | – | 0.005 | 144.96 | 7.24 | 1998/04/09 |
| C/1998 H2 | SOHO-48 | – | 1.0 | – | 0.0067 | 143.75 | 9.67 | 1998/04/30 |
| C/1998 H3 | SOHO-194 | – | 1.0 | – | 0.0054 | 144.16 | 357.63 | 1998/04/26 |
| C/1998 H4 | SOHO-193 | – | 1.0 | – | 0.005 | 143.82 | 359.69 | 1998/04/28 |
| C/1998 H5 | SOHO-393 | – | 1.0 | – | 0.0049 | 143.95 | 5.76 | 1998/04/20 |
| C/1998 H6 | SOHO-394 | – | 1.0 | – | 0.005 | 142.82 | 1.02 | 1998/04/20 |
| C/1998 J2 | SOHO-50 | – | 1.0 | – | 0.0055 | 144.66 | 4.29 | 1998/05/11 |
| C/1998 J3 | SOHO-136 | – | 1.0 | – | 0.0058 | 143.3 | 3.11 | 1998/05/05 |
| C/1998 J4 | SOHO-137 | – | 1.0 | – | 0.0049 | 145.25 | 1.54 | 1998/05/06 |
| C/1998 J5 | SOHO-1144 | – | 1.0 | – | 0.0052 | 145.65 | 354.37 | 1998/05/12 |
| C/1998 K7 | SOHO-51 | – | 1.0 | – | 0.0058 | 144.18 | 7.2 | 1998/05/17 |
| C/1998 K8 | SOHO-52 | – | 1.0 | – | 0.0064 | 143.22 | 11.73 | 1998/05/20 |
| C/1998 K9 | SOHO-53 | – | 1.0 | – | 0.0056 | 144.55 | 4.51 | 1998/05/29 |
| C/1998 K10 | SOHO-54 | – | 1.0 | – | 0.0058 | 143.96 | 0.71 | 1998/06/01 |
| C/1998 K11 | SOHO-55 | – | 1.0 | – | 0.005 | 144.49 | 5.18 | 1998/06/02 |
| C/1998 K12 | SOHO-140 | – | 1.0 | – | 0.0063 | 141.26 | 11.94 | 1998/05/21 |
| C/1998 K13 | SOHO-139 | – | 1.0 | – | 0.009 | 146.44 | 334.35 | 1998/05/22 |
| C/1998 K14 | SOHO-142 | – | 1.0 | – | 0.0051 | 143.91 | 359.45 | 1998/05/26 |
| C/1998 K15 | SOHO-143 | – | 1.0 | – | 0.0078 | 143.85 | 7.41 | 1998/05/29 |
| C/1998 K16 | SOHO-145 | – | 1.0 | – | 0.0058 | 140.86 | 13.52 | 1998/05/29 |
| C/1998 K17 | SOHO-146 | – | 1.0 | – | 0.0087 | 140.04 | 3.12 | 1998/05/31 |
| C/1998 L1 | SOHO-56 | – | 1.0 | – | 0.0075 | 133.45 | 325.48 | 1998/06/11 |
| C/1998 L2 | SOHO-152 | – | 1.0 | – | 0.0052 | 139.09 | 22.49 | 1998/06/04 |
| C/1998 L3 | SOHO-148 | – | 1.0 | – | 0.005 | 143.11 | 6.05 | 1998/06/04 |
| C/1998 L4 | SOHO-149 | – | 1.0 | – | 0.0052 | 144.71 | 6.36 | 1998/06/05 |
| C/1998 L5 | SOHO-150 | – | 1.0 | – | 0.0055 | 145.89 | 357.1 | 1998/06/05 |
| C/1998 L6 | SOHO-151 | – | 1.0 | – | 0.0057 | 143.65 | 9.3 | 1998/06/06 |
| C/1998 L7 | SOHO-153 | – | 1.0 | – | 0.0084 | 132.5 | 321.1 | 1998/06/06 |
| C/1998 L8 | SOHO-154 | – | 1.0 | – | 0.0071 | 144.44 | 337.13 | 1998/06/08 |
| C/1998 L9 | SOHO-155 | – | 1.0 | – | 0.0048 | 143.95 | 2.97 | 1998/06/12 |
| C/1998 L10 | SOHO-1115 | – | 1.0 | – | 0.0079 | 139.5 | 341.53 | 1998/06/02 |
| C/1998 M7 | SOHO-57 | – | 1.0 | – | 0.0054 | 144.54 | 341.17 | 1998/06/17 |
| C/1998 M8 | SOHO-159 | – | 1.0 | – | 0.0055 | 146.26 | 347.41 | 1998/06/19 |
| C/1998 M9 | SOHO-160 | – | 1.0 | – | 0.0061 | 147.31 | 350.68 | 1998/06/22 |
| C/1998 M10 | SOHO-161 | – | 1.0 | – | 0.0064 | 144.24 | 2.73 | 1998/06/24 |
| C/1998 T2 | SOHO-1110 | – | 1.0 | – | 0.0049 | 144.22 | 359.05 | 1998/10/15 |
| C/1998 U6 | SOHO-272 | – | 1.0 | – | 0.0054 | 143.74 | 3.67 | 1998/10/29 |
| C/1998 U7 | SOHO-928 | – | 1.0 | – | 0.0067 | 131.34 | 316.22 | 1998/10/27 |
| C/1998 V1 | SOHO-121 | – | 1.0 | – | 0.0049 | 143.89 | 0.8 | 1998/11/04 |
| C/1998 V2 | SOHO-252 | – | 1.0 | – | 0.0053 | 144.73 | 358.3 | 1998/11/07 |
| C/1998 V3 | SOHO-253 | – | 1.0 | – | 0.0055 | 147.39 | 351.18 | 1998/11/07 |
| C/1998 V4 | SOHO-261 | – | 1.0 | – | 0.005 | 144.64 | 7.78 | 1998/11/09 |
| C/1998 V5 | SOHO-264 | – | 1.0 | – | 0.0067 | 143.04 | 315.6 | 1998/11/02 |
| C/1998 V6 | SOHO-265 | – | 1.0 | – | 0.0079 | 148.56 | 347.96 | 1998/11/03 |
| C/1998 V7 | SOHO-302 | – | 1.0 | – | 0.0048 | 145.2 | 348.36 | 1998/11/07 |
| C/1998 V9 | SOHO-438 | – | 1.0 | – | 0.0072 | 144.9 | 327.81 | 1998/11/08 |
| C/1998 W4 | SOHO-256 | – | 1.0 | – | 0.0057 | 145.14 | 359.98 | 1998/11/24 |
| C/1998 W5 | SOHO-257 | – | 1.0 | – | 0.0082 | 142.26 | 12.86 | 1998/11/25 |
| C/1998 W6 | SOHO-260 | – | 1.0 | – | 0.0064 | 143.37 | 8.43 | 1998/11/26 |
| C/1998 W8 | SOHO-1109 | – | 1.0 | – | 0.0052 | 144.11 | 1.75 | 1998/11/30 |
| C/1998 X3 | SOHO-238 | – | 1.0 | – | 0.0053 | 147.15 | 355.68 | 1998/12/05 |
| C/1998 X4 | SOHO-242 | – | 1.0 | – | 0.0057 | 142.65 | 8.47 | 1998/12/08 |
| C/1998 X5 | SOHO-244 | – | 1.0 | – | 0.0057 | 144.99 | 356.25 | 1998/12/09 |
| C/1998 X6 | SOHO-245 | – | 1.0 | – | 0.006 | 145.03 | 351.42 | 1998/12/10 |
| C/1998 X7 | SOHO-243 | – | 1.0 | – | 0.0058 | 143.98 | 359.36 | 1998/12/10 |
| C/1998 X8 | SOHO-246 | – | 1.0 | – | 0.0055 | 142.86 | 13.18 | 1998/12/12 |
| C/1998 X9 | SOHO-250 | – | 1.0 | – | 0.0053 | 144.96 | 354.66 | 1998/12/14 |
| C/1998 X10 | SOHO-251 | – | 1.0 | – | 0.005 | 145.56 | 340.33 | 1998/12/14 |
| C/1998 X11 | SOHO-262 | – | 1.0 | – | 0.0049 | 140.9 | 13.51 | 1998/12/09 |
| C/1998 X12 | SOHO-440 | – | 1.0 | – | 0.0048 | 144.89 | 354.81 | 1998/12/07 |

=== 1999 ===
| Comet designation | Name/ discoverer(s) | Period (years) | e | a (AU) | q (AU) | i (°) | Node (°) | Perihelion date |
|---|---|---|---|---|---|---|---|---|
| C/1999 C1 | SOHO-58 | – | 1.0 | – | 0.0062 | 144.81 | 3.63 | 1999/02/07 |
| C/1999 C2 | SOHO-113 | – | 1.0 | – | 0.0068 | 144.16 | 354.10 | 1999/02/06 |
| C/1999 D2 | SOHO-1775 | – | 1.0 | – | 0.0051 | – | – | 1999/02/28 |
| C/1999 D3 | SOHO-1776 | – | 1.0 | – | 0.0053 | – | – | 1999/02/28 |
| C/1999 E2 | SOHO-108 | – | 1.0 | – | 0.0051 | – | – | 1999/03/03 |
| C/1999 F4 | SOHO-1960 | – | 1.0 | – | – | – | – | 1999/03/16 |
| C/1999 G2 | SOHO-59 | – | 1.0 | – | 0.0049 | 145.01 | 358.79 | 1999/04/13 |
| C/1999 G3 | SOHO-171 | – | 1.0 | – | 0.0092 | 144.09 | 2.98 | 1999/04/02 |
| C/1999 G4 | SOHO-172 | – | 1.0 | – | 0.0073 | 145.06 | 1.74 | 1999/04/03 |
| C/1999 G5 | SOHO-174 | – | 1.0 | – | 0.0062 | 143.42 | 2.66 | 1999/04/11 |
| C/1999 H2 | SOHO-60 | – | 1.0 | – | 0.0051 | 145.38 | 3.33 | 1999/04/19 |
| C/1999 H4 | SOHO-61 | – | 1.0 | – | 0.0055 | 144.45 | 6.35 | 1999/04/27 |
| C/1999 H5 | SOHO-168 | – | 1.0 | – | 0.0051 | 144.57 | 5.51 | 1999/04/24 |
| C/1999 H6 | SOHO-170 | – | 1.0 | – | 0.0062 | 144.92 | 1.33 | 1999/04/29 |
| C/1999 H7 | SOHO-175 | – | 1.0 | – | 0.0082 | 142.6 | 6.99 | 1999/04/20 |
| C/1999 H8 | SOHO-395 | – | 1.0 | – | 0.005 | 145.23 | 3.73 | 1999/04/20 |
| C/1999 H9 | SOHO-396 | – | 1.0 | – | 0.0072 | 139.46 | 330 | 1999/04/26 |
| C/1999 J1 | SOHO-62 | – | 1.0 | – | 0.0062 | 142.66 | 7.7 | 1999/05/08 |
| C/1999 J7 | SOHO-125 | – | 1.0 | – | 0.007 | 143 | 11.9 | 1999/05/05 |
| C/1999 J8 | SOHO-122 | – | 1.0 | – | 0.0056 | 141.95 | 7.6 | 1999/05/08 |
| C/1999 J9 | SOHO-126 | – | 1.0 | – | 0.005 | 143.92 | 0.53 | 1999/05/09 |
| C/1999 J10 | SOHO-124 | – | 1.0 | – | 0.0072 | 142.38 | 10.2 | 1999/05/11 |
| C/1999 J11 | SOHO-123 | – | 1.0 | – | 0.0051 | 144.48 | 4.02 | 1999/05/14 |
| C/1999 J12 | SOHO-176 | – | 1.0 | – | 0.0051 | 147.21 | 352.92 | 1999/05/03 |
| C/1999 J13 | SOHO-397 | – | 1.0 | – | 0.0052 | 146.78 | 351.72 | 1999/05/14 |
| C/1999 K1 | SOHO-63 | – | 1.0 | – | 0.0051 | 143.78 | 5.49 | 1999/05/21 |
| C/1999 K9 | SOHO-64 | – | 1.0 | – | 0.0065 | 142.66 | 8.45 | 1999/05/24 |
| C/1999 K10 | SOHO-65 | – | 1.0 | – | 0.0055 | 144.89 | 5.29 | 1999/06/01 |
| C/1999 K11 | SOHO-129 | – | 1.0 | – | 0.005 | 143.07 | 7.16 | 1999/05/20 |
| C/1999 K12 | SOHO-131 | – | 1.0 | – | 0.0065 | 145.92 | 311.54 | 1999/05/23 |
| C/1999 K13 | SOHO-132 | – | 1.0 | – | 0.0075 | 138.4 | 323.08 | 1999/05/24 |
| C/1999 K14 | SOHO-133 | – | 1.0 | – | 0.0064 | 143.36 | 9.08 | 1999/05/28 |
| C/1999 K15 | SOHO-134 | – | 1.0 | – | 0.0051 | 144.79 | 358.08 | 1999/05/29 |
| C/1999 K17 | SOHO-400 | – | 1.0 | – | 0.0062 | 141.74 | 12.31 | 1999/05/28 |
| C/1999 L1 | SOHO-67 | – | 1.0 | – | 0.0053 | 143.91 | 1.1 | 1999/06/05 |
| C/1999 L4 | SOHO-66 | – | 1.0 | – | 0.0078 | 137.95 | 348.49 | 1999/06/02 |
| C/1999 L5 | SOHO-68 | – | 1.0 | – | 0.0077 | 144.42 | 6.76 | 1999/06/11 |
| C/1999 L6 | SOHO-157 | – | 1.0 | – | 0.005 | 145.65 | 332.27 | 1999/06/01 |
| C/1999 L7 | SOHO-156 | – | 1.0 | – | 0.0076 | 146.01 | 0.2 | 1999/06/03 |
| C/1999 L8 | SOHO-163 | – | 1.0 | – | 0.0054 | 145.44 | 337.71 | 1999/06/06 |
| C/1999 M1 | SOHO-69 | – | 1.0 | – | 0.0055 | 144.21 | 7.64 | 1999/06/16 |
| C/1999 M2 | SOHO-70 | – | 1.0 | – | 0.0049 | 144.33 | 6.91 | 1999/06/27 |
| C/1999 M4 | SOHO-531 | – | 1.0 | – | 0.0081 | 141.9 | 344.88 | 1999/06/24 |
| C/1999 M5 | SOHO | – | 1.0 | – | 0.0052 | 142.78 | 13.7 | 1999/07/01 |
| C/1999 N1 | SOHO-71 | – | 1.0 | – | 0.0052 | – | – | 1999/07/01 |
| C/1999 N3 | SOHO-72 | – | 1.0 | – | 0.0055 | 144.43 | 7.02 | 1999/07/10 |
| C/1999 O1 | SOHO-75 | – | 1.0 | – | 0.0051 | 144.42 | 359.34 | 1999/08/01 |
| C/1999 O2 | SOHO-73 | – | 1.0 | – | 0.0079 | 139.26 | 338.37 | 1999/07/22 |
| C/1999 O3 | SOHO-74 | – | 1.0 | – | 0.0052 | 143.44 | 10.06 | 1999/08/01 |
| C/1999 O5 | SOHO-1778 | – | 1.0 | – | 0.0048 | – | – | 1999/07/26 |
| C/1999 P2 | SOHO-77 | – | 1.0 | – | 0.0084 | 144.76 | 4.43 | 1999/08/06 |
| C/1999 P3 | SOHO-76 | – | 1.0 | – | 0.0063 | 144.16 | 5.59 | 1999/08/04 |
| C/1999 P4 | SOHO-78 | – | 1.0 | – | 0.005 | 144.33 | 10.74 | 1999/08/10 |
| C/1999 P5 | SOHO-79 | – | 1.0 | – | 0.0063 | 144.69 | 355.21 | 1999/08/12 |
| C/1999 Q1 | SOHO-80 | – | 1.0 | – | 0.0053 | 142.16 | 15.74 | 1999/08/24 |
| C/1999 Q2 | SOHO-81 | – | 1.0 | – | 0.005 | 144.55 | 0.48 | 1999/08/25 |
| C/1999 Q3 | SOHO-82 | – | 1.0 | – | 0.0052 | 144.42 | 7.55 | 1999/08/31 |
| C/1999 Q4 | SOHO-1777 | – | 1.0 | – | 0.0050 | – | – | 1999/08/25 |
| C/1999 R3 | SOHO-83 | – | 1.0 | – | 0.0053 | 144.37 | 1.53 | 1999/09/06 |
| C/1999 R4 | SOHO-84 | – | 1.0 | – | 0.0051 | 143.91 | 3.17 | 1999/09/06 |
| C/1999 R5 | SOHO-1727 | – | 1.0 | – | 0.0049 | – | – | 1999/09/09 |
| C/1999 S1 | SOHO-86 | – | 1.0 | – | 0.005 | 144.06 | 1.11 | 1999/09/17 |
| C/1999 S5 | SOHO-87 | – | 1.0 | – | 0.005 | 144.4 | 1.79 | 1999/09/21 |
| C/1999 S6 | SOHO-88 | – | 1.0 | – | 0.0065 | 143.85 | 8.51 | 1999/09/21 |
| C/1999 S7 | SOHO-89 | – | 1.0 | – | 0.0051 | 143.99 | 3.2 | 1999/09/24 |
| C/1999 S8 | SOHO-1728 | – | 1.0 | – | 0.0052 | – | – | 1999/09/20 |
| C/1999 U5 | SOHO-91 | – | 1.0 | – | 0.0072 | 132.5 | 331.61 | 1999/11/01 |
| C/1999 U6 | SOHO-207 | – | 1.0 | – | 0.0055 | 144.17 | 2.23 | 1999/10/18 |
| C/1999 U7 | SOHO-211 | – | 1.0 | – | 0.005 | 145.54 | 3.57 | 1999/10/27 |
| C/1999 U8 | SOHO-212 | – | 1.0 | – | 0.0051 | 143.96 | 5.31 | 1999/10/29 |
| C/1999 U9 | SOHO-213 | – | 1.0 | – | 0.0053 | 142.86 | 4.02 | 1999/10/30 |
| C/1999 V2 | SOHO-215 | – | 1.0 | – | 0.0049 | 144.56 | 6.55 | 1999/11/08 |
| C/1999 V3 | SOHO-216 | – | 1.0 | – | 0.0056 | 146.24 | 357.22 | 1999/11/15 |
| C/1999 V4 | SOHO-217 | – | 1.0 | – | 0.0051 | 142.57 | 10.38 | 1999/11/15 |
| C/1999 V5 | SOHO-1160 | – | 1.0 | – | 0.0051 | 141.25 | 358.13 | 1999/11/14 |
| C/1999 W1 | SOHO-92 | – | 1.0 | – | 0.0088 | 136.57 | 9.34 | 1999/11/23 |
| C/1999 W2 | SOHO-420 | – | 1.0 | – | 0.0055 | 141.45 | 13.36 | 1999/11/26 |
| C/1999 X2 | SOHO-177 | – | 1.0 | – | 0.0059 | 148.35 | 346.83 | 1999/12/04 |
| C/1999 Y3 | SOHO-94 | – | 1.0 | – | 0.0056 | 144.43 | 6.49 | 1999/12/21 |

== 2000s ==
=== 2000 ===
| Comet designation | Name/ discoverer(s) | Period (years) | e | a (AU) | q (AU) | i (°) | Node (°) | Perihelion date |
|---|---|---|---|---|---|---|---|---|
| C/2000 A2 | SOHO-255 | – | 1.0 | – | 0.0061 | 145.65 | 2.55 | 2000/01/15 |
| C/2000 B1 | SOHO-97 | – | 1.0 | – | 0.0054 | 144.52 | 7.65 | 2000/01/25 |
| C/2000 B5 | SOHO-96 | – | 1.0 | – | 0.0054 | 144.21 | 2.86 | 2000/01/18 |
| C/2000 B6 | SOHO-98 | – | 1.0 | – | 0.0052 | 140.89 | 359.24 | 2000/01/30 |
| C/2000 B7 | SOHO-99 | – | 1.0 | – | 0.005 | 144.63 | 0.45 | 2000/02/01 |
| C/2000 C6 | SOHO-104 | – | 1.0 | – | 0.0062 | 144.78 | 4.47 | 2000/02/10 |
| C/2000 D1 | SOHO-106 | – | 1.0 | – | 0.0051 | 144.56 | 0.93 | 2000/03/01 |
| C/2000 D3 | SOHO-103 | – | 1.0 | – | 0.0066 | 139.71 | 339.9 | 2000/02/26 |
| C/2000 D4 | SOHO-1903 | – | 1.0 | – | – | – | – | 2000/02/23 |
| – | SOHO-4779 | – | 1.0 | – | – | – | – | 2000/03/02 |
| C/2000 E1 | SOHO-107 | – | 1.0 | – | 0.005 | 144.33 | 9.73 | 2000/03/05 |
| C/2000 F1 | SOHO-110 | – | 1.0 | – | 0.006 | 144.4 | 7.52 | 2000/04/01 |
| C/2000 F2 | SOHO-451 | – | 1.0 | – | 0.0053 | 139.59 | 337.53 | 2000/03/19 |
| C/2000 F3 | SOHO-462 | – | 1.0 | – | 0.0052 | 135.93 | 323.69 | 2000/03/28 |
| – | SOHO-4673 | – | 1.0 | – | – | – | – | 2000/03/31 |
| C/2000 G3 | SOHO | – | 1.0 | – | 0.0072 | 133.75 | 327.21 | 2000/04/11 |
| C/2000 H2 | SOHO-111 | – | 1.0 | – | 0.0055 | 144.17 | 2.94 | 2000/04/30 |
| C/2000 H3 | SOHO-289 | – | 1.0 | – | 0.005 | 144.57 | 6.32 | 2000/04/17 |
| C/2000 H4 | SOHO-287 | – | 1.0 | – | 0.0049 | 144.92 | 8.34 | 2000/04/30 |
| C/2000 H5 | SOHO-291 | – | 1.0 | – | 0.005 | 144.8 | 9.18 | 2000/04/30 |
| C/2000 H6 | SOHO-430 | – | 1.0 | – | 0.0064 | 145.18 | 337.89 | 2000/04/26 |
| C/2000 H7 | SOHO-431 | – | 1.0 | – | 0.0079 | 144.2 | 8.17 | 2000/04/29 |
| C/2000 J3 | SOHO-114 | – | 1.0 | – | 0.0057 | 142.96 | 10.01 | 2000/05/10 |
| C/2000 J4 | SOHO-115 | – | 1.0 | – | 0.0065 | 142.56 | 8.91 | 2000/05/15 |
| C/2000 J5 | SOHO-117 | – | 1.0 | – | 0.0081 | 138.42 | 341.35 | 2000/05/12 |
| C/2000 J6 | SOHO-282 | – | 1.0 | – | 0.0064 | 142.38 | 10.21 | 2000/05/11 |
| C/2000 J7 | SOHO-288 | – | 1.0 | – | 0.0055 | 143.48 | 4.59 | 2000/05/04 |
| C/2000 K3 | SOHO-116 | – | 1.0 | – | 0.0051 | 145.47 | 353.01 | 2000/05/20 |
| C/2000 K4 | SOHO-118 | – | 1.0 | – | 0.0055 | 145.78 | 2.79 | 2000/05/23 |
| C/2000 K5 | SOHO-119 | – | 1.0 | – | 0.0055 | 144.24 | 2.78 | 2000/05/26 |
| C/2000 K6 | SOHO-120 | – | 1.0 | – | 0.0051 | 143.17 | 6.27 | 2000/05/27 |
| C/2000 K7 | SOHO-283 | – | 1.0 | – | 0.0062 | 143.07 | 9.68 | 2000/05/19 |
| C/2000 K8 | SOHO-284 | – | 1.0 | – | 0.0053 | 144.98 | 358.92 | 2000/05/30 |
| C/2000 L1 | SOHO-127 | – | 1.0 | – | 0.0053 | 144.01 | 12.66 | 2000/06/03 |
| C/2000 L2 | SOHO-128 | – | 1.0 | – | 0.0056 | 143.42 | 4.67 | 2000/06/10 |
| C/2000 L3 | SOHO-130 | – | 1.0 | – | 0.0054 | 145.41 | 340.31 | 2000/06/10 |
| C/2000 L4 | SOHO-135 | – | 1.0 | – | 0.0061 | 142.19 | 4.89 | 2000/06/15 |
| C/2000 L5 | SOHO-138 | – | 1.0 | – | 0.0075 | 143.99 | 9.05 | 2000/06/16 |
| C/2000 L6 | SOHO-285 | – | 1.0 | – | 0.0074 | 141.06 | 309.34 | 2000/06/11 |
| C/2000 M1 | SOHO-141 | – | 1.0 | – | 0.0055 | 144.96 | 5.22 | 2000/06/18 |
| C/2000 M2 | SOHO-144 | – | 1.0 | – | 0.0052 | 144.01 | 12.65 | 2000/06/18 |
| C/2000 M3 | SOHO-147 | – | 1.0 | – | 0.0051 | 145.25 | 347.41 | 2000/06/19 |
| C/2000 M4 | SOHO-158 | – | 1.0 | – | 0.0055 | 145.77 | 343.32 | 2000/06/22 |
| C/2000 M5 | SOHO-162 | – | 1.0 | – | 0.0067 | 146.53 | 354.9 | 2000/06/24 |
| C/2000 M6 | SOHO-166 | – | 1.0 | – | 0.005 | 145.19 | 2.9 | 2000/06/25 |
| C/2000 M7 | SOHO-164 | – | 1.0 | – | 0.0055 | 144.4 | 1.59 | 2000/06/27 |
| C/2000 M8 | SOHO-165 | – | 1.0 | – | 0.005 | 142.18 | 15.71 | 2000/06/28 |
| C/2000 M9 | SOHO-167 | – | 1.0 | – | 0.0054 | 144.53 | 7.63 | 2000/07/01 |
| C/2000 N1 | SOHO-169 | – | 1.0 | – | 0.0049 | 144.08 | 1.88 | 2000/07/03 |
| C/2000 N2 | SOHO-173 | – | 1.0 | – | 0.0067 | 143.83 | 12.38 | 2000/07/08 |
| C/2000 N3 | SOHO-286 | – | 1.0 | – | 0.005 | 145.48 | 7.75 | 2000/07/05 |
| – | SOHO-3468 | – | 1.0 | – | – | – | – | 2000/07/14 |
| C/2000 P1 | SOHO-191 | – | 1.0 | – | 0.0049 | 143.41 | 7.24 | 2000/08/07 |
| C/2000 P2 | SOHO-195 | – | 1.0 | – | 0.005 | 143.55 | 4.16 | 2000/08/15 |
| C/2000 P4 | SOHO-1832 | – | 1.0 | – | 0.0065 | – | – | 2000/08/02 |
| C/2000 P5 | SOHO-1833 | – | 1.0 | – | 0.0079 | – | – | 2000/08/02 |
| – | SOHO-4674 | – | 1.0 | – | – | – | – | 2000/09/25 |
| C/2000 S6 | SOHO-941 | – | 1.0 | – | 0.005 | 144.59 | 2.93 | 2000/09/29 |
| C/2000 S8 | SOHO-1834 | – | 1.0 | – | 0.0048 | – | – | 2000/09/23 |
| C/2000 S9 | SOHO-1835 | – | 1.0 | – | 0.0047 | – | – | 2000/09/30 |
| C/2000 T1 | SOHO-204 | – | 1.0 | – | 0.0051 | 144.09 | 2.25 | 2000/10/11 |
| C/2000 T3 | SOHO-205 | – | 1.0 | – | 0.0051 | 145.22 | 4.77 | 2000/10/11 |
| C/2000 T4 | SOHO-206 | – | 1.0 | – | 0.0051 | 144.67 | 7.49 | 2000/10/12 |
| C/2000 T5 | SOHO-453 | – | 1.0 | – | 0.0056 | 146.54 | 355.75 | 2000/10/07 |
| C/2000 T6 | SOHO-454 | – | 1.0 | – | 0.0049 | 141.3 | 317.9 | 2000/10/12 |
| C/2000 U1 | SOHO-208 | – | 1.0 | – | 0.0051 | 144.25 | 10.96 | 2000/10/21 |
| C/2000 U2 | SOHO-209 | – | 1.0 | – | 0.0075 | 144.49 | 7.68 | 2000/10/23 |
| C/2000 U3 | SOHO-210 | – | 1.0 | – | 0.0074 | 141.43 | 344.74 | 2000/10/24 |
| C/2000 U4 | SOHO-214 | – | 1.0 | – | 0.005 | 146.5 | 359.74 | 2000/10/25 |
| C/2000 V1 | SOHO-221 | – | 1.0 | – | 0.0056 | 144.08 | 2.59 | 2000/11/05 |
| C/2000 V2 | SOHO-228 | – | 1.0 | – | 0.007 | 140.24 | 347.37 | 2000/11/05 |
| C/2000 V3 | SOHO-236 | – | 1.0 | – | 0.0051 | 144 | 3.77 | 2000/03/11 |
| C/2000 W2 | SOHO-248 | – | 1.0 | – | 0.0051 | 146.4 | 353.04 | 2000/11/16 |
| C/2000 W3 | SOHO-247 | – | 1.0 | – | 0.0076 | 144.38 | 8.23 | 2000/11/18 |
| C/2000 W4 | SOHO-249 | – | 1.0 | – | 0.0053 | 144.52 | 359.32 | 2000/11/20 |
| C/2000 W5 | SOHO-259 | – | 1.0 | – | 0.0049 | 145.72 | 5.15 | 2000/11/27 |
| C/2000 X1 | SOHO-263 | – | 1.0 | – | 0.005 | 145.96 | 7 | 2000/12/03 |
| C/2000 X2 | SOHO-267 | – | 1.0 | – | 0.0055 | 143.15 | 12.94 | 2000/12/06 |
| C/2000 X3 | SOHO-266 | – | 1.0 | – | 0.0056 | 144.49 | 359.3 | 2000/12/06 |
| C/2000 X4 | SOHO-270 | – | 1.0 | – | 0.0059 | 141.91 | 314.54 | 2000/12/05 |
| C/2000 X5 | SOHO-269 | – | 1.0 | – | 0.0055 | 143.18 | 3.76 | 2000/12/07 |
| C/2000 X6 | SOHO-268 | – | 1.0 | – | 0.0077 | 138.16 | 346.04 | 2000/12/07 |
| C/2000 X7 | SOHO-271 | – | 1.0 | – | 0.0059 | 147.79 | 340.27 | 2000/12/11 |
| C/2000 X8 | SOHO-273 | – | 1.0 | – | 0.0054 | 140.57 | 23.5 | 2000/12/13 |
| C/2000 Y4 | SOHO-275 | – | 1.0 | – | 0.0051 | 132.68 | 324.92 | 2000/12/18 |
| C/2000 Y5 | SOHO-276 | – | 1.0 | – | 0.007 | 142.93 | 315.39 | 2000/12/20 |
| C/2000 Y8 | SOHO-279 | – | 1.0 | – | 0.006 | 145.95 | 3.25 | 2000/12/24 |
| C/2000 Y9 | SOHO-280 | – | 1.0 | – | 0.0051 | 147.66 | 343.96 | 2000/12/25 |

=== 2001 ===
| Comet designation | Name/ discoverer(s) | Period (years) | e | a (AU) | q (AU) | i (°) | Node (°) | Perihelion date |
|---|---|---|---|---|---|---|---|---|
| C/2001 A3 | SOHO-281 | – | 1.0 | – | 0.0069 | 143.63 | 12.05 | 2001/01/08 |
| C/2001 A4 | SOHO-290 | – | 1.0 | – | 0.0054 | 144.69 | 356.82 | 2001/01/14 |
| C/2001 A5 | SOHO-1831 | – | 1.0 | – | 0.0055 | – | – | 2001/01/02 |
| C/2001 B3 | SOHO-292 | – | 1.0 | – | 0.0077 | 144.54 | 7.1 | 2001/01/25 |
| C/2001 C2 | SOHO-294 | – | 1.0 | – | 0.0053 | 144.61 | 8.15 | 2001/02/07 |
| C/2001 C3 | SOHO-293 | – | 1.0 | – | 0.0051 | 144.59 | 1.02 | 2001/02/04 |
| C/2001 C4 | SOHO-295 | – | 1.0 | – | 0.0051 | 134.29 | 328 | 2001/02/08 |
| C/2001 C6 | SOHO-296 | – | 1.0 | – | 0.0058 | 139.77 | 340.03 | 2001/02/15 |
| C/2001 D2 | SOHO-1904 | – | 1.0 | – | – | – | – | 2001/02/19 |
| – | SOHO-1905 | – | 1.0 | – | – | – | – | 2001/02/28 |
| – | SOHO-2934 | – | 1.0 | – | – | – | – | 2001/03/31 |
| C/2001 F2 | SOHO-301 | – | 1.0 | – | 0.0049 | 144.58 | 8.16 | 2001/03/27 |
| C/2001 G2 | SOHO-303 | – | 1.0 | – | 0.0057 | – | – | 2001/04/09 |
| C/2001 G3 | SOHO-304 | – | 1.0 | – | 0.0079 | – | – | 2001/04/11 |
| C/2001 H1 | SOHO-307 | – | 1.0 | – | 0.0084 | – | – | 2001/04/20 |
| C/2001 H2 | SOHO-306 | – | 1.0 | – | 0.0072 | – | – | 2001/04/20 |
| C/2001 H3 | SOHO-305 | – | 1.0 | – | 0.0075 | – | – | 2001/04/20 |
| C/2001 H4 | SOHO-308 | – | 1.0 | – | 0.0067 | – | – | 2001/04/20 |
| C/2001 H6 | SOHO-309 | – | 1.0 | – | 0.0058 | – | – | 2001/04/27 |
| C/2001 H7 | SOHO-310 | – | 1.0 | – | 0.0053 | – | – | 2001/04/30 |
| C/2001 H8 | SOHO-447 | – | 1.0 | – | 0.0065 | – | – | 2001/04/18 |
| – | SOHO-4716 | – | 1.0 | – | – | – | – | 2001/05/03 |
| C/2001 J2 | SOHO-311 | – | 1.0 | – | 0.0074 | 142.82 | 14.97 | 2001/05/05 |
| C/2001 J3 | SOHO-312 | – | 1.0 | – | 0.0084 | 138.41 | 332.57 | 2001/05/07 |
| C/2001 J4 | SOHO-313 | – | 1.0 | – | 0.0052 | 143.05 | 7.06 | 2001/05/10 |
| C/2001 J5 | SOHO-467 | – | 1.0 | – | 0.0053 | 141.93 | 13.43 | 2001/05/13 |
| C/2001 K2 | SOHO-314 | – | 1.0 | – | 0.0051 | 143.11 | 10.77 | 2001/05/20 |
| C/2001 K4 | SOHO-315 | – | 1.0 | – | 0.0071 | 145.97 | 3.06 | 2001/05/22 |
| C/2001 K6 | SOHO-316 | – | 1.0 | – | 0.0062 | 148.11 | 324.74 | 2001/05/23 |
| C/2001 K7 | SOHO-317 | – | 1.0 | – | 0.0075 | 143.43 | 8.1 | 2001/05/24 |
| – | SOHO-4717 | – | 1.0 | – | – | – | – | 2001/05/17 |
| C/2001 K8 | SOHO-318 | – | 1.0 | – | 0.0077 | 143.33 | 11.75 | 2001/05/30 |
| C/2001 K9 | SOHO-319 | – | 1.0 | – | 0.0054 | 141.54 | 12.89 | 2001/05/25 |
| C/2001 K10 | SOHO-469 | – | 1.0 | – | 0.0051 | 147.11 | 15.02 | 2001/05/19 |
| C/2001 L1 | SOHO-320 | – | 1.0 | – | 0.0057 | 141.65 | 18.23 | 2001/06/03 |
| C/2001 L2 | SOHO-322 | – | 1.0 | – | 0.0052 | 145.13 | 323.04 | 2001/06/04 |
| C/2001 L3 | SOHO-321 | – | 1.0 | – | 0.005 | 142.67 | 10.15 | 2001/06/05 |
| C/2001 L4 | SOHO-323 | – | 1.0 | – | 0.0053 | 146.12 | 347.67 | 2001/06/06 |
| C/2001 L5 | SOHO-324 | – | 1.0 | – | 0.0051 | 141.06 | 14.76 | 2001/06/06 |
| C/2001 L6 | SOHO-325 | – | 1.0 | – | 0.0049 | 145.25 | 330.92 | 2001/06/09 |
| C/2001 L7 | SOHO-326 | – | 1.0 | – | 0.0049 | 141.86 | 17.76 | 2001/06/09 |
| – | SOHO-4718 | – | 1.0 | – | – | – | – | 2001/06/09 |
| C/2001 L8 | SOHO-327 | – | 1.0 | – | 0.0059 | 137.37 | 24.73 | 2001/06/10 |
| C/2001 L9 | SOHO-328 | – | 1.0 | – | 0.0076 | 134.64 | 29.69 | 2001/06/14 |
| C/2001 L11 | SOHO-480 | – | 1.0 | – | 0.005 | 144.49 | 1.06 | 2001/06/08 |
| C/2001 M2 | SOHO-330 | – | 1.0 | – | 0.0059 | 144.85 | 4.76 | 2001/06/17 |
| C/2001 M3 | SOHO-331 | – | 1.0 | – | 0.005 | 143.08 | 8.66 | 2001/06/17 |
| C/2001 M4 | SOHO-332 | – | 1.0 | – | 0.0051 | 144.88 | 359.53 | 2001/06/19 |
| C/2001 M5 | SOHO-333 | – | 1.0 | – | 0.0052 | 143.84 | 5.25 | 2001/06/20 |
| C/2001 M6 | SOHO-335 | – | 1.0 | – | 0.0058 | 145.43 | 352.78 | 2001/06/22 |
| C/2001 M7 | SOHO-336 | – | 1.0 | – | 0.0072 | 143.14 | 12.44 | 2001/06/26 |
| C/2001 M8 | SOHO-337 | – | 1.0 | – | 0.0046 | 144.66 | 1.92 | 2001/06/27 |
| C/2001 M9 | SOHO-338 | – | 1.0 | – | 0.0051 | 145.62 | 353.22 | 2001/06/27 |
| C/2001 M11 | SOHO-339 | – | 1.0 | – | 0.0061 | 145.09 | 4.48 | 2001/06/27 |
| – | SOHO-340 | – | 1.0 | – | – | – | – | 2001/07/06 |
| C/2001 O1 | SOHO-341 | – | 1.0 | – | 0.0051 | 144.49 | 0.1 | 2001/07/16 |
| C/2001 O3 | SOHO-1837 | – | 1.0 | – | 0.0046 | – | – | 2001/07/25 |
| – | SOHO-343 | – | 1.0 | – | – | – | – | 2001/08/04 |
| C/2001 P2 | SOHO-344 | – | 1.0 | – | 0.005 | 144.76 | 1.34 | 2001/08/15 |
| C/2001 Q9 | SOHO-966 | – | 1.0 | – | 0.0071 | 144.77 | 355.98 | 2001/08/16 |
| C/2001 R2 | SOHO-347 | – | 1.0 | – | 0.005 | 144.42 | 9.73 | 2001/09/04 |
| C/2001 R3 | SOHO-348 | – | 1.0 | – | 0.0057 | 144.19 | 12.11 | 2001/09/05 |
| C/2001 R4 | SOHO-349 | – | 1.0 | – | 0.0072 | 138.72 | 337.75 | 2001/09/08 |
| C/2001 R5 | SOHO-350 | – | 1.0 | – | 0.0069 | 144.67 | 8.92 | 2001/09/11 |
| C/2001 R10 | SOHO-1836 | – | 1.0 | – | 0.0050 | – | – | 2001/09/03 |
| C/2001 S2 | SOHO-353 | – | 1.0 | – | 0.0053 | 144.4 | 2.68 | 2001/09/28 |
| C/2001 S3 | SOHO-967 | – | 1.0 | – | 0.005 | 144.46 | 9.39 | 2001/09/29 |
| C/2001 T2 | SOHO-356 | – | 1.0 | – | 0.007 | 143.82 | 5.3 | 2001/10/13 |
| C/2001 T6 | SOHO-357 | – | 1.0 | – | 0.0057 | 146.71 | 358.68 | 2001/10/15 |
| C/2001 T7 | SOHO-363 | – | 1.0 | – | 0.005 | 144.85 | 7.44 | 2001/10/07 |
| C/2001 U1 | SOHO-358 | – | 1.0 | – | 0.0055 | 144.36 | 7.79 | 2001/10/16 |
| C/2001 U2 | SOHO-362 | – | 1.0 | – | 0.0065 | 142.98 | 7.05 | 2001/10/17 |
| C/2001 U3 | SOHO-360 | – | 1.0 | – | 0.005 | 144.58 | 8.62 | 2001/10/17 |
| C/2001 U4 | SOHO-361 | – | 1.0 | – | 0.0048 | 144.21 | 2.99 | 2001/10/18 |
| C/2001 U5 | SOHO-364 | – | 1.0 | – | 0.0052 | 144.11 | 3.7 | 2001/10/19 |
| C/2001 U7 | SOHO-365 | – | 1.0 | – | 0.0061 | 143.87 | 357.28 | 2001/10/19 |
| C/2001 U8 | SOHO-366 | – | 1.0 | – | 0.0049 | 143.94 | 8.56 | 2001/10/18 |
| C/2001 U9 | SOHO-367 | – | 1.0 | – | 0.005 | 144.5 | 9.19 | 2001/10/23 |
| – | SOHO-4720 | – | 1.0 | – | – | – | – | 2001/10/26 |
| C/2001 U10 | SOHO-369 | – | 1.0 | – | 0.005 | 145.23 | 4.08 | 2001/10/31 |
| C/2001 V1 | SOHO-370 | – | 1.0 | – | 0.0075 | 143.76 | 337.44 | 2001/11/01 |
| C/2001 V2 | SOHO-371 | – | 1.0 | – | 0.0055 | 145.4 | 11.81 | 2001/11/04 |
| C/2001 V3 | SOHO-372 | – | 1.0 | – | 0.0053 | 146.86 | 349.53 | 2001/11/11 |
| C/2001 V4 | SOHO-373 | – | 1.0 | – | 0.0051 | 144.84 | 4.71 | 2001/11/13 |
| C/2001 V5 | SOHO-374 | – | 1.0 | – | 0.0053 | 145.6 | 358.22 | 2001/11/14 |
| – | SOHO-4721 | – | 1.0 | – | – | – | – | 2001/11/19 |
| – | SOHO-4722 | – | 1.0 | – | – | – | – | 2001/11/19 |
| C/2001 W3 | SOHO-375 | – | 1.0 | – | 0.0059 | 141.95 | 13.58 | 2001/11/22 |
| C/2001 W4 | SOHO-376 | – | 1.0 | – | 0.0056 | 140.34 | 18.18 | 2001/11/26 |
| C/2001 W5 | SOHO-1729 | – | 1.0 | – | 0.0064 | – | – | 2001/11/22 |
| C/2001 X4 | SOHO-377 | – | 1.0 | – | 0.0049 | 147.82 | 336.54 | 2001/12/02 |
| – | SOHO-4723 | – | 1.0 | – | – | – | – | 2001/12/02 |
| C/2001 X5 | SOHO-378 | – | 1.0 | – | 0.0059 | 138.71 | 23.35 | 2001/12/04 |
| – | SOHO-4724 | – | 1.0 | – | – | – | – | 2001/12/05 |
| C/2001 X6 | SOHO-379 | – | 1.0 | – | 0.0052 | 147.01 | 328.76 | 2001/12/06 |
| C/2001 X7 | SOHO-380 | – | 1.0 | – | 0.0076 | 147.3 | 353.27 | 2001/12/08 |
| C/2001 X9 | SOHO-382 | – | 1.0 | – | 0.0076 | 142.15 | 309.62 | 2001/12/13 |
| C/2001 Y2 | SOHO-384 | – | 1.0 | – | 0.0054 | 143.8 | 5.16 | 2001/12/16 |
| C/2001 Y3 | SOHO-385 | – | 1.0 | – | 0.0074 | 145.34 | 6.49 | 2001/12/16 |
| C/2001 Y4 | SOHO-387 | – | 1.0 | – | 0.007 | 144.61 | 324.05 | 2001/12/18 |
| C/2001 Y5 | SOHO-386 | – | 1.0 | – | 0.0053 | 144.61 | 8.83 | 2001/12/22 |

=== 2002 ===
| Comet designation | Name/ discoverer(s) | Period (years) | e | a (AU) | q (AU) | i (°) | Node (°) | Perihelion date |
|---|---|---|---|---|---|---|---|---|
| C/2002 C3 | SOHO | – | 1.0 | – | 0.0052 | 141.83 | 355.39 | 2002/02/06 |
| C/2002 C4 | SOHO | – | 1.0 | – | 0.0054 | 144.46 | 0.34 | 2002/02/11 |
| C/2002 D1 | SOHO | – | 1.0 | – | 0.0063 | 143.09 | 358.77 | 2002/02/22 |
| C/2002 E1 | SOHO | – | 1.0 | – | 0.0056 | 145.49 | 9.11 | 2002/03/03 |
| C/2002 E3 | SOHO | – | 1.0 | – | 0.0052 | 144.69 | 8.96 | 2002/03/16 |
| C/2002 F2 | SOHO | – | 1.0 | – | 0.0051 | 144.03 | 4.73 | 2002/03/21 |
| C/2002 F3 | SOHO | – | 1.0 | – | 0.005 | 146.11 | 6.72 | 2002/03/25 |
| – | SOHO-4730 | – | 1.0 | – | – | – | – | 2002/03/28 |
| C/2002 G2 | SOHO | – | 1.0 | – | 0.005 | 144.84 | 3.48 | 2002/04/04 |
| C/2002 G4 | SOHO | – | 1.0 | – | 0.0052 | 143.9 | 14.29 | 2002/04/04 |
| C/2002 G5 | SOHO | – | 1.0 | – | 0.0072 | 144.26 | 5.63 | 2002/04/13 |
| C/2002 H1 | SOHO | – | 1.0 | – | 0.0074 | 142.51 | 349.27 | 2002/04/18 |
| C/2002 H3 | SOHO | – | 1.0 | – | 0.0053 | 145.88 | 4.29 | 2002/04/18 |
| C/2002 H4 | SOHO | – | 1.0 | – | 0.0052 | 145.42 | 359.38 | 2002/04/18 |
| C/2002 H5 | SOHO | – | 1.0 | – | 0.0054 | 137.98 | 307.81 | 2002/04/19 |
| C/2002 H6 | SOHO | – | 1.0 | – | 0.0073 | 142.42 | 18.23 | 2002/04/26 |
| C/2002 H7 | SOHO | – | 1.0 | – | 0.0058 | 145.43 | 5.76 | 2002/04/24 |
| C/2002 J1 | SOHO | – | 1.0 | – | 0.0051 | 145.64 | 0.57 | 2002/05/02 |
| C/2002 J2 | SOHO | – | 1.0 | – | 0.0052 | 143.53 | 15.62 | 2002/05/03 |
| C/2002 J3 | SOHO | – | 1.0 | – | 0.0074 | 139.42 | 337.34 | 2002/05/15 |
| C/2002 J6 | SOHO | – | 1.0 | – | 0.005 | 143.35 | 11.71 | 2002/05/15 |
| C/2002 J7 | SOHO | – | 1.0 | – | 0.0055 | 143.53 | 8.35 | 2002/05/16 |
| C/2002 J8 | SOHO | – | 1.0 | – | 0.0078 | 140.93 | 340.02 | 2002/05/13 |
| C/2002 K3 | SOHO | – | 1.0 | – | 0.0053 | 142.51 | 13.19 | 2002/05/19 |
| – | SOHO-4726 | – | 1.0 | – | – | – | – | 2002/05/23 |
| C/2002 K5 | SOHO | – | 1.0 | – | 0.005 | 143.68 | 15.52 | 2002/05/24 |
| C/2002 K6 | SOHO | – | 1.0 | – | 0.0079 | 139.9 | 341.98 | 2002/05/25 |
| C/2002 K7 | SOHO | – | 1.0 | – | 0.005 | 144.52 | 12.54 | 2002/05/25 |
| C/2002 K8 | SOHO | – | 1.0 | – | 0.005 | 141.85 | 15.75 | 2002/05/26 |
| C/2002 K9 | SOHO | – | 1.0 | – | 0.0056 | 143.26 | 15.08 | 2002/05/26 |
| C/2002 K10 | SOHO | – | 1.0 | – | 0.0053 | 141.09 | 17.22 | 2002/05/31 |
| – | SOHO-4727 | – | 1.0 | – | – | – | – | 2002/05/31 |
| C/2002 K11 | SOHO | – | 1.0 | – | 0.005 | 143.35 | 9.39 | 2002/05/27 |
| C/2002 L1 | SOHO | – | 1.0 | – | 0.005 | 143.44 | 17.21 | 2002/06/06 |
| C/2002 L2 | SOHO | – | 1.0 | – | 0.005 | 147.52 | 345.87 | 2002/06/06 |
| C/2002 L3 | SOHO | – | 1.0 | – | 0.0072 | 143.32 | 12.96 | 2002/06/07 |
| C/2002 L4 | SOHO | – | 1.0 | – | 0.0048 | 144.37 | 13.56 | 2002/06/07 |
| C/2002 L5 | SOHO | – | 1.0 | – | 0.006 | 145.52 | 329.14 | 2002/06/11 |
| C/2002 L6 | SOHO | – | 1.0 | – | 0.0059 | 143.3 | 0.46 | 2002/06/08 |
| C/2002 L7 | SOHO | – | 1.0 | – | 0.0051 | 145.89 | 346.92 | 2002/06/14 |
| C/2002 L8 | SOHO | – | 1.0 | – | 0.0051 | 146.04 | 350.37 | 2002/06/15 |
| C/2002 M1 | SOHO | – | 1.0 | – | 0.0052 | 144.96 | 7.31 | 2002/06/21 |
| C/2002 M2 | SOHO | – | 1.0 | – | 0.0075 | 139.55 | 339 | 2002/06/18 |
| C/2002 M3 | SOHO | – | 1.0 | – | 0.0065 | 146.35 | 344.39 | 2002/06/24 |
| C/2002 M4 | SOHO | – | 1.0 | – | 0.0064 | 145.41 | 335.55 | 2002/06/27 |
| C/2002 M5 | SOHO | – | 1.0 | – | 0.0051 | 145.65 | 15.24 | 2002/06/28 |
| C/2002 M6 | SOHO | – | 1.0 | – | 0.0049 | 142.86 | 15.24 | 2002/06/29 |
| C/2002 M7 | SOHO | – | 1.0 | – | 0.0049 | 143.3 | 14.18 | 2002/06/29 |
| C/2002 M8 | SOHO | – | 1.0 | – | 0.0057 | 134.08 | 8.17 | 2002/06/16 |
| C/2002 N1 | SOHO | – | 1.0 | – | 0.0053 | 136.62 | 19.83 | 2002/07/09 |
| C/2002 O1 | SOHO | – | 1.0 | – | 0.0052 | 144.77 | 0.95 | 2002/07/17 |
| C/2002 O2 | SOHO | – | 1.0 | – | 0.0049 | 144.72 | 11.84 | 2002/07/17 |
| C/2002 O3 | SOHO | – | 1.0 | – | 0.0048 | 144.38 | 3.81 | 2002/07/17 |
| P/2002 P2 | SOHO | – | 1.0 | – | 0.0049 | 143.87 | 6.38 | 2002/08/11 |
| C/2002 Q7 | SOHO | – | 1.0 | – | 0.0049 | 144.8 | 11.7 | 2002/08/25 |
| C/2002 Q11 | SOHO | – | 1.0 | – | 0.0052 | 145.38 | 359.8 | 2002/08/30 |
| C/2002 Q12 | SOHO | – | 1.0 | – | 0.005 | 144.02 | 3.57 | 2002/08/19 |
| C/2002 Q13 | SOHO | – | 1.0 | – | 0.0054 | 144.31 | 2.15 | 2002/08/27 |
| C/2002 Q14 | SOHO | – | 1.0 | – | 0.0077 | 145.34 | 359.96 | 2002/08/30 |
| C/2002 R6 | SOHO | – | 1.0 | – | 0.0051 | 144.64 | 5.94 | 2002/09/14 |
| C/2002 R7 | SOHO | – | 1.0 | – | 0.0052 | 144.72 | 12.27 | 2002/09/14 |
| C/2002 S2 | SOHO | – | 1.0 | – | 0.0053 | 144.31 | 3.76 | 2002/09/19 |
| C/2002 S3 | SOHO | – | 1.0 | – | 0.0062 | 145.05 | 8.25 | 2002/09/18 |
| C/2002 S6 | SOHO | – | 1.0 | – | 0.005 | 146.22 | 7.28 | 2002/09/21 |
| C/2002 S8 | SOHO | – | 1.0 | – | 0.0053 | 144.46 | 3.36 | 2002/09/22 |
| C/2002 S9 | SOHO | – | 1.0 | – | 0.0049 | 144.27 | 5.64 | 2002/09/24 |
| C/2002 S10 | SOHO | – | 1.0 | – | 0.0052 | 144.17 | 4.59 | 2002/09/26 |
| – | SOHO-4729 | – | 1.0 | – | – | – | – | 2002/10/08 |
| C/2002 T3 | SOHO | – | 1.0 | – | 0.0077 | 144.21 | 11.38 | 2002/10/09 |
| C/2002 U1 | SOHO | – | 1.0 | – | 0.0059 | 145.9 | 6.96 | 2002/10/16 |
| C/2002 U3 | SOHO | – | 1.0 | – | 0.0053 | 143.12 | 7.95 | 2002/10/17 |
| C/2002 U4 | SOHO | – | 1.0 | – | 0.0051 | 144.67 | 9.72 | 2002/10/23 |
| C/2002 U5 | SOHO | – | 1.0 | – | 0.005 | 144.31 | 11.48 | 2002/10/28 |
| C/2002 U7 | SOHO | – | 1.0 | – | 0.0051 | 145.16 | 2.71 | 2002/10/31 |
| C/2002 U8 | SOHO | – | 1.0 | – | 0.0051 | 143.97 | 4.42 | 2002/10/31 |
| C/2002 U9 | SOHO | – | 1.0 | – | 0.005 | 144.17 | 10.22 | 2002/10/31 |
| C/2002 V3 | SOHO | – | 1.0 | – | 0.0051 | 144.48 | 9.49 | 2002/11/09 |
| C/2002 V6 | SOHO | – | 1.0 | – | 0.0077 | 138.73 | 331.9 | 2002/11/13 |
| C/2002 V7 | SOHO | – | 1.0 | – | 0.0052 | 143.67 | 8.8 | 2002/11/16 |
| C/2002 W1 | SOHO | – | 1.0 | – | 0.0069 | 138.86 | 320.24 | 2002/11/16 |
| C/2002 W2 | SOHO | – | 1.0 | – | 0.0072 | 144.15 | 11.08 | 2002/11/18 |
| C/2002 W3 | SOHO | – | 1.0 | – | 0.0051 | 142.31 | 12.58 | 2002/11/19 |
| C/2002 W4 | SOHO | – | 1.0 | – | 0.0051 | 144.06 | 12.68 | 2002/11/19 |
| C/2002 W5 | SOHO | – | 1.0 | – | 0.0049 | 143.67 | 8.42 | 2002/11/20 |
| C/2002 W6 | SOHO | – | 1.0 | – | 0.0051 | 141.93 | 13.31 | 2002/11/20 |
| C/2002 W7 | SOHO | – | 1.0 | – | 0.0076 | 139.69 | 327.04 | 2002/11/22 |
| C/2002 W8 | SOHO | – | 1.0 | – | 0.0073 | 139.37 | 339.16 | 2002/11/23 |
| C/2002 W9 | SOHO | – | 1.0 | – | 0.0051 | 144.03 | 6.73 | 2002/11/23 |
| C/2002 W10 | SOHO | – | 1.0 | – | 0.0055 | 141.11 | 18.3 | 2002/11/24 |
| C/2002 W11 | SOHO | – | 1.0 | – | 0.0053 | 143.17 | 13.74 | 2002/11/25 |
| C/2002 W12 | SOHO | – | 1.0 | – | 0.0049 | 144.49 | 4.32 | 2002/11/28 |
| C/2002 W13 | SOHO | – | 1.0 | – | 0.005 | 143.49 | 9.07 | 2002/11/28 |
| C/2002 W14 | SOHO | – | 1.0 | – | 0.005 | 143.16 | 9.3 | 2002/11/29 |
| C/2002 W15 | SOHO | – | 1.0 | – | 0.007 | 145.16 | 9.26 | 2002/11/29 |
| C/2002 W16 | SOHO | – | 1.0 | – | 0.0085 | 136.41 | 357.85 | 2002/11/29 |
| C/2002 W17 | SOHO | – | 1.0 | – | 0.0056 | 138.52 | 26.89 | 2002/11/29 |
| C/2002 X3 | SOHO | – | 1.0 | – | 0.0051 | 141.67 | 13.32 | 2002/12/04 |
| C/2002 X4 | SOHO | – | 1.0 | – | 0.0052 | 141.31 | 17.23 | 2002/12/04 |
| C/2002 X7 | SOHO | – | 1.0 | – | 0.0052 | 137.42 | 24.1 | 2002/12/01 |
| C/2002 X8 | SOHO | – | 1.0 | – | 0.0049 | 142.08 | 314.04 | 2002/12/05 |
| C/2002 X9 | SOHO | – | 1.0 | – | 0.0082 | 139.82 | 331.62 | 2002/12/05 |
| C/2002 X10 | SOHO | – | 1.0 | – | 0.005 | 143.16 | 7.94 | 2002/12/05 |
| C/2002 X11 | SOHO | – | 1.0 | – | 0.005 | 143.4 | 13.86 | 2002/12/09 |
| C/2002 X12 | SOHO | – | 1.0 | – | 0.0051 | 139.96 | 25.65 | 2002/12/10 |
| C/2002 X13 | SOHO | – | 1.0 | – | 0.005 | 137.25 | 305.7 | 2002/12/03 |
| C/2002 X14 | SOHO | – | 1.0 | – | 0.0042 | 144.59 | 4.59 | 2002/12/12 |
| C/2002 X15 | SOHO | – | 1.0 | – | 0.0048 | 133.28 | 33.03 | 2002/12/14 |
| C/2002 X16 | SOHO | – | 1.0 | – | 0.0051 | 145.02 | 0.57 | 2002/12/11 |
| C/2002 Y3 | SOHO | – | 1.0 | – | 0.0049 | 146.92 | 356.64 | 2002/12/18 |
| C/2002 Y4 | SOHO | – | 1.0 | – | 0.0055 | 147.76 | 353.2 | 2002/12/26 |

=== 2003 ===
| Comet designation | Name/ discoverer(s) | Period (years) | e | a (AU) | q (AU) | i (°) | Node (°) | Perihelion date |
|---|---|---|---|---|---|---|---|---|
| C/2003 A3 | SOHO | – | 1.0 | – | 0.0055 | 140.05 | 350.46 | 2003/01/07 |
| C/2003 A4 | SOHO | – | 1.0 | – | 0.0071 | 144.57 | 9.57 | 2003/01/16 |
| C/2003 A5 | SOHO | – | 1.0 | – | 0.0048 | 144.84 | 12.29 | 2003/01/16 |
| C/2003 B2 | SOHO | – | 1.0 | – | 0.0049 | 144.97 | 7.39 | 2003/01/19 |
| C/2003 B3 | SOHO | – | 1.0 | – | 0.0051 | 144.73 | 3.77 | 2003/01/23 |
| C/2003 C1 | SOHO | – | 1.0 | – | 0.0049 | 140.05 | 347.03 | 2003/02/04 |
| C/2003 C2 | SOHO | – | 1.0 | – | 0.0047 | 144.47 | 11.52 | 2003/02/09 |
| C/2003 C3 | SOHO | – | 1.0 | – | 0.005 | 142.05 | 8.91 | 2003/02/11 |
| C/2003 C4 | SOHO | – | 1.0 | – | 0.0051 | 145.05 | 8.77 | 2003/02/14 |
| C/2003 C5 | SOHO | – | 1.0 | – | 0.0049 | 144.42 | 1.84 | 2003/02/17 |
| C/2003 C6 | SOHO | – | 1.0 | – | 0.0051 | 146.81 | 351.72 | 2003/02/08 |
| C/2003 D1 | SOHO | – | 1.0 | – | 0.0052 | 144.7 | 9.68 | 2003/03/01 |
| C/2003 E2 | SOHO | – | 1.0 | – | 0.0049 | 144.06 | 2.57 | 2003/03/04 |
| C/2003 E3 | SOHO | – | 1.0 | – | 0.0051 | 145.29 | 7.97 | 2003/03/12 |
| C/2003 E4 | SOHO | – | 1.0 | – | 0.005 | 144.66 | 9.37 | 2003/03/16 |
| C/2003 F3 | SOHO | – | 1.0 | – | 0.0049 | 144.59 | 9.82 | 2003/03/21 |
| – | SOHO-4757 | – | 1.0 | – | – | – | – | 2003/03/22 |
| C/2003 F4 | SOHO | – | 1.0 | – | 0.0051 | 145.06 | 8.5 | 2003/03/25 |
| C/2003 F5 | SOHO | – | 1.0 | – | 0.0049 | 144.55 | 10.01 | 2003/03/30 |
| C/2003 G4 | SOHO | – | 1.0 | – | 0.005 | 147.49 | 1.78 | 2003/04/02 |
| C/2003 G5 | SOHO | – | 1.0 | – | 0.0051 | 144.12 | 4.2 | 2003/04/06 |
| C/2003 H8 | SOHO | – | 1.0 | – | 0.005 | 144.12 | 8.63 | 2003/04/23 |
| C/2003 H9 | SOHO | – | 1.0 | – | 0.0048 | 143.76 | 8.35 | 2003/04/25 |
| C/2003 H10 | SOHO | – | 1.0 | – | 0.005 | 143.83 | 5.9 | 2003/04/29 |
| C/2003 H11 | SOHO | – | 1.0 | – | 0.0051 | 137.2 | 306.78 | 2003/04/29 |
| C/2003 H12 | SOHO | – | 1.0 | – | 0.0051 | 144.35 | 5.25 | 2003/05/01 |
| C/2003 J2 | SOHO | – | 1.0 | – | 0.0051 | 143.39 | 7.47 | 2003/05/01 |
| C/2003 J3 | SOHO | – | 1.0 | – | 0.005 | 142.82 | 8.48 | 2003/05/06 |
| C/2003 J4 | SOHO | – | 1.0 | – | 0.005 | 144.58 | 12.8 | 2003/05/06 |
| C/2003 J5 | SOHO | – | 1.0 | – | 0.0051 | 143.94 | 11.87 | 2003/05/08 |
| C/2003 J6 | SOHO | – | 1.0 | – | 0.0055 | 143.08 | 16.55 | 2003/05/10 |
| C/2003 J7 | SOHO | – | 1.0 | – | 0.0074 | 141.86 | 349.09 | 2003/05/15 |
| C/2003 J8 | SOHO | – | 1.0 | – | 0.005 | 144.29 | 3.18 | 2003/05/16 |
| C/2003 J9 | SOHO | – | 1.0 | – | 0.005 | 144.18 | 14.4 | 2003/05/16 |
| – | SOHO-4758 | – | 1.0 | – | – | – | – | 2003/05/18 |
| C/2003 K7 | SOHO | – | 1.0 | – | 0.0051 | 144.15 | 12.35 | 2003/05/24 |
| C/2003 K8 | SOHO | – | 1.0 | – | 0.0076 | 135.87 | 28.75 | 2003/05/22 |
| – | SOHO-4854 | – | 1.0 | – | – | – | – | 2003/05/23 |
| C/2003 K9 | SOHO | – | 1.0 | – | 0.0041 | 144.48 | 1.39 | 2003/05/24 |
| C/2003 K10 | SOHO | – | 1.0 | – | 0.005 | 144.2 | 3.91 | 2003/05/27 |
| C/2003 K11 | SOHO | – | 1.0 | – | 0.005 | 141.58 | 17.8 | 2003/05/27 |
| C/2003 K12 | SOHO | – | 1.0 | – | 0.0091 | 136.8 | 4.8 | 2003/05/29 |
| C/2003 K13 | SOHO | – | 1.0 | – | 0.0057 | 148.89 | 348.81 | 2003/05/24 |
| C/2003 L3 | SOHO | – | 1.0 | – | 0.005 | 142.65 | 18.74 | 2003/06/02 |
| C/2003 L4 | SOHO | – | 1.0 | – | 0.005 | 141.93 | 20.72 | 2003/06/06 |
| C/2003 L5 | SOHO | – | 1.0 | – | 0.005 | 144.23 | 3.81 | 2003/06/10 |
| C/2003 L6 | SOHO | – | 1.0 | – | 0.005 | 135.18 | 32.28 | 2003/06/10 |
| C/2003 L7 | SOHO | – | 1.0 | – | 0.0057 | 133.71 | 37.11 | 2003/06/14 |
| C/2003 L8 | SOHO | – | 1.0 | – | 0.0048 | 141.6 | 14.55 | 2003/06/16 |
| C/2003 M1 | SOHO | – | 1.0 | – | 0.0044 | 144.57 | 0.22 | 2003/06/16 |
| C/2003 M2 | SOHO | – | 1.0 | – | 0.0043 | 143.54 | 8.57 | 2003/06/18 |
| C/2003 M3 | SOHO | – | 1.0 | – | 0.0044 | 141.43 | 20.06 | 2003/06/18 |
| C/2003 M4 | SOHO | – | 1.0 | – | 0.0068 | 141.94 | 10.56 | 2003/06/18 |
| C/2003 M5 | SOHO | – | 1.0 | – | 0.007 | 139.29 | 340.42 | 2003/06/19 |
| C/2003 M6 | SOHO | – | 1.0 | – | 0.0066 | 143.2 | 13.06 | 2003/06/20 |
| C/2003 M7 | SOHO | – | 1.0 | – | 0.005 | 145.25 | 344.94 | 2003/06/20 |
| C/2003 M8 | SOHO | – | 1.0 | – | 0.0054 | 147.58 | 345.29 | 2003/06/22 |
| C/2003 M9 | SOHO | – | 1.0 | – | 0.0053 | 146.97 | 358.61 | 2003/06/23 |
| C/2003 M10 | SOHO | – | 1.0 | – | 0.0058 | 148.86 | 341.76 | 2003/06/23 |
| C/2003 M11 | SOHO | – | 1.0 | – | 0.0052 | 145.69 | 341.37 | 2003/06/23 |
| C/2003 M12 | SOHO | – | 1.0 | – | 0.0048 | 143.12 | 8.42 | 2003/06/23 |
| C/2003 N1 | SOHO | – | 1.0 | – | 0.0049 | 144.79 | 7.21 | 2003/07/06 |
| C/2003 N2 | SOHO | – | 1.0 | – | 0.0048 | 146.13 | 8.4 | 2003/07/13 |
| C/2003 O4 | SOHO | – | 1.0 | – | 0.0053 | 134.3 | 330.26 | 2003/07/19 |
| C/2003 O5 | SOHO | – | 1.0 | – | 0.0067 | 139.42 | 339.9 | 2003/07/21 |
| C/2003 O6 | SOHO | – | 1.0 | – | 0.005 | 144.55 | 9.49 | 2003/07/25 |
| C/2003 O7 | SOHO | – | 1.0 | – | 0.0051 | 144.99 | 358.3 | 2003/07/26 |
| C/2003 O8 | SOHO | – | 1.0 | – | 0.0052 | 145.34 | 356.06 | 2003/07/30 |
| C/2003 P1 | SOHO | – | 1.0 | – | 0.0054 | 145.12 | 355.98 | 2003/08/03 |
| C/2003 P2 | SOHO | – | 1.0 | – | 0.0053 | 139.66 | 13.52 | 2003/08/04 |
| C/2003 P3 | SOHO | – | 1.0 | – | 0.005 | 144.43 | 8.87 | 2003/08/06 |
| – | SOHO-5109 | – | 1.0 | – | – | – | – | 2003/08/23 |
| C/2003 Q2 | SOHO | – | 1.0 | – | 0.0049 | 144.57 | 9.12 | 2003/08/25 |
| C/2003 Q3 | SOHO | – | 1.0 | – | 0.0053 | 144.84 | 7.95 | 2003/08/24 |
| C/2003 Q4 | SOHO | – | 1.0 | – | 0.0051 | 144.43 | 9.27 | 2003/08/25 |
| C/2003 Q5 | SOHO | – | 1.0 | – | 0.005 | 144.7 | 8.63 | 2003/08/27 |
| C/2003 Q7 | SOHO | – | 1.0 | – | 0.006 | 144.06 | 11.23 | 2003/08/30 |
| C/2003 Q8 | SOHO | – | 1.0 | – | 0.005 | 144.94 | 8.04 | 2003/08/30 |
| C/2003 Q9 | SOHO | – | 1.0 | – | 0.0051 | 144.26 | 3.13 | 2003/08/31 |
| C/2003 Q10 | SOHO | – | 1.0 | – | 0.0054 | 144.48 | 11.64 | 2003/08/25 |
| C/2003 R2 | SOHO | – | 1.0 | – | 0.005 | 141.91 | 18.95 | 2003/09/05 |
| C/2003 R3 | SOHO | – | 1.0 | – | 0.005 | 144.75 | 8.79 | 2003/09/09 |
| C/2003 S5 | SOHO | – | 1.0 | – | 0.005 | 144.77 | 9.13 | 2003/09/19 |
| C/2003 S6 | SOHO | – | 1.0 | – | 0.0066 | 141.01 | 19.09 | 2003/09/19 |
| C/2003 S7 | SOHO | – | 1.0 | – | 0.0049 | 145 | 2.99 | 2003/09/22 |
| C/2003 S8 | SOHO | – | 1.0 | – | 0.0052 | 144.28 | 1.9 | 2003/09/26 |
| – | SOHO-4780 | – | 1.0 | – | – | – | – | 2003/09/26 |
| – | SOHO-4759 | – | 1.0 | – | – | – | – | 2003/10/01 |
| – | SOHO-4760 | – | 1.0 | – | – | – | – | 2003/10/03 |
| C/2003 T5 | SOHO | – | 1.0 | – | 0.0051 | 144.53 | 9.05 | 2003/10/09 |
| C/2003 T6 | SOHO | – | 1.0 | – | 0.0071 | 144.66 | 353.66 | 2003/10/10 |
| C/2003 T7 | SOHO | – | 1.0 | – | 0.005 | 144.54 | 9.18 | 2003/10/10 |
| C/2003 T8 | SOHO | – | 1.0 | – | 0.005 | 143.21 | 6.09 | 2003/10/09 |
| C/2003 T9 | SOHO | – | 1.0 | – | 0.0054 | 149.12 | 357.61 | 2003/10/10 |
| C/2003 T10 | SOHO | – | 1.0 | – | 0.0049 | 144.53 | 9.01 | 2003/10/14 |
| C/2003 T11 | SOHO | – | 1.0 | – | 0.0053 | 146.04 | 4.99 | 2003/10/15 |
| C/2003 U5 | SOHO | – | 1.0 | – | 0.0052 | 144.6 | 8.93 | 2003/10/17 |
| C/2003 U6 | SOHO | – | 1.0 | – | 0.005 | 144.48 | 9.07 | 2003/10/21 |
| C/2003 U7 | SOHO | – | 1.0 | – | 0.0051 | 144.44 | 12.13 | 2003/10/23 |
| C/2003 U8 | SOHO | – | 1.0 | – | 0.005 | 137.65 | 294.41 | 2003/10/26 |
| C/2003 U9 | SOHO | – | 1.0 | – | 0.005 | 144.22 | 10.76 | 2003/10/28 |
| – | SOHO-4761 | – | 1.0 | – | – | – | – | 2003/11/09 |
| C/2003 W3 | SOHO | – | 1.0 | – | 0.0052 | 142.21 | 11.32 | 2003/11/16 |
| C/2003 W4 | SOHO | – | 1.0 | – | 0.0052 | 140.98 | 18.15 | 2003/11/22 |
| C/2003 W5 | SOHO | – | 1.0 | – | 0.0067 | 144.58 | 8.51 | 2003/11/23 |
| C/2003 W6 | SOHO | – | 1.0 | – | 0.0048 | 144.51 | 9.27 | 2003/11/27 |
| C/2003 W7 | SOHO | – | 1.0 | – | 0.0049 | 144.5 | 6.62 | 2003/11/27 |
| C/2003 W8 | SOHO | – | 1.0 | – | 0.005 | 118.3 | 35.43 | 2003/11/29 |
| C/2003 X1 | SOHO | – | 1.0 | – | 0.0048 | 143.28 | 17.9 | 2003/12/01 |
| C/2003 X2 | SOHO | – | 1.0 | – | 0.0085 | 134.58 | 17.48 | 2003/12/01 |
| C/2003 X3 | SOHO | – | 1.0 | – | 0.005 | 133.82 | 37.3 | 2003/12/02 |
| C/2003 X4 | SOHO | – | 1.0 | – | 0.0053 | 136.31 | 29.52 | 2003/12/05 |
| C/2003 X5 | SOHO | – | 1.0 | – | 0.0073 | 139.87 | 21.99 | 2003/12/05 |
| C/2003 X6 | SOHO | – | 1.0 | – | 0.0049 | 145.82 | 325.8 | 2003/12/06 |
| – | SOHO-4763 | – | 1.0 | – | – | – | – | 2003/12/07 |
| C/2003 X7 | SOHO | – | 1.0 | – | 0.005 | 139.81 | 26.19 | 2003/12/08 |
| C/2003 X8 | SOHO | – | 1.0 | – | 0.005 | 141.22 | 20.45 | 2003/12/08 |
| C/2003 X9 | SOHO | – | 1.0 | – | 0.0049 | 142.28 | 316.87 | 2003/12/08 |
| C/2003 X10 | SOHO | – | 1.0 | – | 0.0053 | 147.85 | 328.24 | 2003/12/11 |
| C/2003 X11 | SOHO | – | 1.0 | – | 0.005 | 143.45 | 13.35 | 2003/12/14 |
| C/2003 Y2 | SOHO | – | 1.0 | – | 0.0052 | 147.13 | 353.43 | 2003/12/19 |
| C/2003 Y3 | SOHO | – | 1.0 | – | 0.007 | 145.75 | 322.68 | 2003/12/20 |
| C/2003 Y4 | SOHO | – | 1.0 | – | 0.0049 | 145.41 | 352.48 | 2003/12/21 |
| C/2003 Y5 | SOHO | – | 1.0 | – | 0.0051 | 144.52 | 3.81 | 2003/12/23 |
| C/2003 Y6 | SOHO | – | 1.0 | – | 0.0048 | 144.6 | 8.49 | 2003/12/24 |
| C/2003 Y7 | SOHO | – | 1.0 | – | 0.0047 | 143.18 | 15.81 | 2003/12/25 |
| C/2003 Y8 | SOHO | – | 1.0 | – | 0.005 | 146.52 | 4.15 | 2003/12/25 |
| C/2003 Y9 | SOHO | – | 1.0 | – | 0.0054 | 146.53 | 350.7 | 2003/12/25 |
| C/2003 Y10 | SOHO | – | 1.0 | – | 0.0051 | 147.1 | 355.72 | 2003/12/26 |
| C/2003 Y11 | SOHO | – | 1.0 | – | 0.0048 | 144.96 | 6.94 | 2003/12/26 |
| C/2003 Y12 | SOHO | – | 1.0 | – | 0.0049 | 145.83 | 346.72 | 2003/12/27 |
| C/2003 Y13 | SOHO | – | 1.0 | – | 0.0056 | 143.83 | 356.28 | 2003/12/29 |
| C/2003 Y14 | SOHO | – | 1.0 | – | 0.0049 | 146.14 | 352.76 | 2003/12/27 |
| C/2003 Y15 | SOHO | – | 1.0 | – | 0.0061 | 142.53 | 12 | 2004/01/01 |

=== 2004 ===
| Comet designation | Name/ discoverer(s) | Period (years) | e | a (AU) | q (AU) | i (°) | Node (°) | Perihelion date |
|---|---|---|---|---|---|---|---|---|
| C/2004 A2 | SOHO | – | 1.0 | – | 0.0048 | 144.71 | 8.01 | 2004/01/11 |
| C/2004 A4 | SOHO | – | 1.0 | – | 0.0048 | 134.78 | 333.15 | 2004/01/08 |
| C/2004 B4 | SOHO | – | 1.0 | – | 0.0062 | 139.1 | 341.76 | 2004/01/19 |
| C/2004 B5 | SOHO | – | 1.0 | – | 0.0051 | 144.37 | 7.17 | 2004/01/20 |
| C/2004 B6 | SOHO | – | 1.0 | – | 0.0053 | 145.11 | 350.52 | 2004/01/21 |
| C/2004 B7 | SOHO | – | 1.0 | – | 0.0054 | 139.51 | 342.23 | 2004/01/22 |
| C/2004 B8 | SOHO | – | 1.0 | – | 0.005 | 144.63 | 355.83 | 2004/01/25 |
| C/2004 B9 | SOHO | – | 1.0 | – | 0.0051 | 143.75 | 6.69 | 2004/01/26 |
| C/2004 B10 | SOHO | – | 1.0 | – | 0.0051 | 144.69 | 8.68 | 2004/01/30 |
| C/2004 B11 | SOHO | – | 1.0 | – | 0.0066 | 144.67 | 343.51 | 2004/01/21 |
| C/2004 C3 | SOHO | – | 1.0 | – | 0.005 | 139.56 | 341.65 | 2004/02/04 |
| C/2004 C4 | SOHO | – | 1.0 | – | 0.0052 | 146.02 | 12.5 | 2004/02/08 |
| C/2004 C5 | SOHO | – | 1.0 | – | 0.005 | 142.36 | 3.9 | 2004/02/09 |
| C/2004 C6 | SOHO | – | 1.0 | – | 0.0051 | 143.02 | 2.34 | 2004/02/10 |
| C/2004 C7 | SOHO | – | 1.0 | – | 0.0049 | 144.47 | 2.3 | 2004/02/14 |
| C/2004 C8 | SOHO | – | 1.0 | – | 0.005 | 144.68 | 2.41 | 2004/02/14 |
| C/2004 D2 | SOHO | – | 1.0 | – | 0.0051 | 145.2 | 6.23 | 2004/02/26 |
| C/2004 D3 | SOHO | – | 1.0 | – | 0.0051 | 145.52 | 7.75 | 2004/02/26 |
| C/2004 D4 | SOHO | – | 1.0 | – | 0.005 | 145.15 | 6.49 | 2004/02/28 |
| C/2004 E1 | SOHO | – | 1.0 | – | 0.0053 | 146.65 | 2.61 | 2004/03/09 |
| C/2004 E3 | SOHO | – | 1.0 | – | 0.005 | 144.21 | 8.67 | 2004/03/15 |
| C/2004 E4 | SOHO | – | 1.0 | – | 0.0064 | 144.91 | 7.24 | 2004/03/16 |
| C/2004 E5 | SOHO | – | 1.0 | – | 0.005 | 142.71 | 1.67 | 2004/03/01 |
| C/2004 F5 | SOHO | – | 1.0 | – | 0.005 | 144.5 | 0.35 | 2004/03/18 |
| C/2004 F6 | SOHO | – | 1.0 | – | 0.006 | 144.37 | 3.47 | 2004/03/23 |
| C/2004 F7 | SOHO | – | 1.0 | – | 0.005 | 142.89 | 8.1 | 2004/03/26 |
| C/2004 G3 | SOHO | – | 1.0 | – | 0.0076 | 141.37 | 338.33 | 2004/04/03 |
| C/2004 G4 | SOHO | – | 1.0 | – | 0.0064 | 144.51 | 8.45 | 2004/04/04 |
| C/2004 G5 | SOHO | – | 1.0 | – | 0.0052 | 144.29 | 8.43 | 2004/04/11 |
| C/2004 G6 | SOHO | – | 1.0 | – | 0.0051 | 144.91 | 7.31 | 2004/04/12 |
| C/2004 G7 | SOHO | – | 1.0 | – | 0.0051 | 144.19 | 3.21 | 2004/04/14 |
| C/2004 G8 | SOHO | – | 1.0 | – | 0.005 | 144.42 | 8.21 | 2004/04/14 |
| – | SOHO-4764 | – | 1.0 | – | – | – | – | 2004/04/15 |
| C/2004 G9 | SOHO | – | 1.0 | – | 0.0052 | 144.22 | 8.85 | 2004/04/16 |
| C/2004 H7 | SOHO | – | 1.0 | – | 0.0052 | 144.22 | 10.51 | 2004/04/19 |
| C/2004 H8 | SOHO | – | 1.0 | – | 0.0049 | 145.03 | 1.38 | 2004/04/19 |
| C/2004 H9 | SOHO | – | 1.0 | – | 0.0051 | 146.39 | 339.72 | 2004/04/19 |
| – | SOHO-4765 | – | 1.0 | – | – | – | – | 2004/04/20 |
| C/2004 H10 | SOHO | – | 1.0 | – | 0.0051 | 145.04 | 334.44 | 2004/04/30 |
| C/2004 J1 | SOHO | – | 1.0 | – | 0.0053 | 143.97 | 4.6 | 2004/05/03 |
| C/2004 J2 | SOHO | – | 1.0 | – | 0.0053 | 146.87 | 1.73 | 2004/05/05 |
| C/2004 J3 | SOHO | – | 1.0 | – | 0.005 | 143.24 | 6.14 | 2004/05/05 |
| C/2004 J5 | SOHO | – | 1.0 | – | 0.0049 | 146.53 | 356.93 | 2004/05/06 |
| C/2004 J6 | SOHO | – | 1.0 | – | 0.0053 | 144.23 | 6.26 | 2004/05/07 |
| C/2004 J7 | SOHO | – | 1.0 | – | 0.0051 | 146.68 | 356.13 | 2004/05/09 |
| C/2004 J8 | SOHO | – | 1.0 | – | 0.0048 | 144.55 | 8.23 | 2004/05/12 |
| C/2004 J9 | SOHO | – | 1.0 | – | 0.0054 | 140.88 | 16.14 | 2004/05/11 |
| C/2004 J10 | SOHO | – | 1.0 | – | 0.0055 | 143 | 14.05 | 2004/05/12 |
| C/2004 J11 | SOHO | – | 1.0 | – | 0.005 | 144.08 | 13.61 | 2004/05/13 |
| C/2004 J14 | SOHO | – | 1.0 | – | 0.0048 | 144.07 | 10.45 | 2004/05/14 |
| C/2004 J19 | SOHO | – | 1.0 | – | 0.005 | 144.99 | 3.16 | 2004/05/15 |
| C/2004 K4 | SOHO | – | 1.0 | – | 0.0052 | 144.01 | 11.22 | 2004/05/18 |
| C/2004 K5 | SOHO | – | 1.0 | – | 0.0051 | 142.11 | 11.45 | 2004/05/20 |
| C/2004 K6 | SOHO | – | 1.0 | – | 0.005 | 142.22 | 11.05 | 2004/05/22 |
| C/2004 K7 | SOHO | – | 1.0 | – | 0.005 | 137.71 | 23.35 | 2004/05/23 |
| C/2004 K8 | SOHO | – | 1.0 | – | 0.0067 | 140.04 | 317.62 | 2004/05/24 |
| C/2004 K9 | SOHO | – | 1.0 | – | 0.0049 | 140.6 | 18.25 | 2004/05/25 |
| C/2004 K10 | SOHO | – | 1.0 | – | 0.0049 | 143.85 | 5.46 | 2004/05/25 |
| C/2004 K11 | SOHO | – | 1.0 | – | 0.0048 | 144.2 | 9.39 | 2004/05/28 |
| C/2004 K12 | SOHO | – | 1.0 | – | 0.0049 | 143.93 | 10.28 | 2004/05/31 |
| C/2004 L3 | SOHO | – | 1.0 | – | 0.005 | 133.49 | 37.61 | 2004/06/05 |
| C/2004 L4 | SOHO | – | 1.0 | – | 0.0056 | 135.88 | 32.4 | 2004/06/08 |
| C/2004 L5 | SOHO | – | 1.0 | – | 0.005 | 142.3 | 12.36 | 2004/06/08 |
| C/2004 L6 | SOHO | – | 1.0 | – | 0.0049 | 137.6 | 25.12 | 2004/06/09 |
| C/2004 L7 | SOHO | – | 1.0 | – | 0.0075 | 138.77 | 330.47 | 2004/06/10 |
| C/2004 L8 | SOHO | – | 1.0 | – | 0.0049 | 132.59 | 355.13 | 2004/06/11 |
| C/2004 L9 | SOHO | – | 1.0 | – | 0.0051 | 141.15 | 22.25 | 2004/06/11 |
| C/2004 L11 | SOHO | – | 1.0 | – | 0.008 | 147.71 | 343.04 | 2004/06/15 |
| C/2004 M1 | SOHO | – | 1.0 | – | 0.0049 | 145.93 | 0.01 | 2004/06/18 |
| C/2004 M2 | SOHO | – | 1.0 | – | 0.0049 | 144.72 | 346.57 | 2004/06/25 |
| C/2004 M3 | SOHO | – | 1.0 | – | 0.0078 | 142.55 | 320.26 | 2004/06/26 |
| C/2004 M4 | SOHO | – | 1.0 | – | 0.0049 | 144.68 | 6.04 | 2004/06/27 |
| C/2004 M5 | SOHO | – | 1.0 | – | 0.0051 | 145.12 | 341.83 | 2004/06/27 |
| C/2004 M6 | SOHO | – | 1.0 | – | 0.005 | 144.7 | 344.2 | 2004/06/27 |
| C/2004 M7 | SOHO | – | 1.0 | – | 0.0052 | 144.26 | 6.15 | 2004/06/28 |
| C/2004 N1 | SOHO | – | 1.0 | – | 0.005 | 145.83 | 0.49 | 2004/07/01 |
| C/2004 N2 | SOHO | – | 1.0 | – | 0.0047 | 144.8 | 353.62 | 2004/07/02 |
| C/2004 N3 | SOHO | – | 1.0 | – | 0.0048 | 144.75 | 6.41 | 2004/07/06 |
| C/2004 N4 | SOHO | – | 1.0 | – | 0.0076 | 142.03 | 345.84 | 2004/07/07 |
| C/2004 N5 | SOHO | – | 1.0 | – | 0.0055 | 146.04 | 357.8 | 2004/07/08 |
| C/2004 N6 | SOHO | – | 1.0 | – | 0.0049 | 137.04 | 24.76 | 2004/07/09 |
| C/2004 O1 | SOHO | – | 1.0 | – | 0.0068 | 144.67 | 7.12 | 2004/07/18 |
| C/2004 O2 | SOHO | – | 1.0 | – | 0.0058 | 143.76 | 354.61 | 2004/07/18 |
| C/2004 O3 | SOHO | – | 1.0 | – | 0.0051 | 138.99 | 22.27 | 2004/07/26 |
| C/2004 P2 | SOHO | – | 1.0 | – | 0.005 | 143.26 | 5.56 | 2004/08/04 |
| C/2004 P3 | SOHO | – | 1.0 | – | 0.0051 | 145.69 | 4.68 | 2004/08/06 |
| C/2004 P4 | SOHO | – | 1.0 | – | 0.0052 | 144.85 | 355.6 | 2004/08/06 |
| C/2004 P5 | SOHO | – | 1.0 | – | 0.0061 | 133.1 | 324.88 | 2004/08/09 |
| C/2004 P6 | SOHO | – | 1.0 | – | 0.0056 | 143.16 | 13.1 | 2004/08/14 |
| C/2004 P7 | SOHO | – | 1.0 | – | 0.005 | 142.67 | 15.42 | 2004/08/16 |
| C/2004 Q3 | SOHO | – | 1.0 | – | 0.0049 | 144.39 | 358.53 | 2004/08/20 |
| C/2004 Q4 | SOHO | – | 1.0 | – | 0.0047 | 144.36 | 359.32 | 2004/08/21 |
| C/2004 Q5 | SOHO | – | 1.0 | – | 0.0052 | 144.53 | 356.66 | 2004/08/26 |
| C/2004 Q6 | SOHO | – | 1.0 | – | 0.0045 | 144.51 | 6.29 | 2004/08/26 |
| C/2004 R4 | SOHO | – | 1.0 | – | 0.0054 | 144.83 | 5.81 | 2004/09/06 |
| C/2004 R5 | SOHO | – | 1.0 | – | 0.0052 | 143.92 | 1.93 | 2004/09/05 |
| C/2004 R6 | SOHO | – | 1.0 | – | 0.0054 | 140.49 | 3.77 | 2004/09/06 |
| C/2004 R7 | SOHO | – | 1.0 | – | 0.0086 | 143.75 | 357.59 | 2004/09/06 |
| C/2004 S2 | SOHO | – | 1.0 | – | 0.0053 | 144.91 | 6.94 | 2004/09/21 |
| C/2004 S3 | SOHO | – | 1.0 | – | 0.0069 | 144.8 | 5.95 | 2004/09/23 |
| C/2004 S4 | SOHO | – | 1.0 | – | 0.0049 | 144.29 | 1.86 | 2004/09/29 |
| C/2004 T4 | SOHO | – | 1.0 | – | 0.0048 | 143.95 | 1.27 | 2004/10/05 |
| C/2004 T5 | SOHO | – | 1.0 | – | 0.0048 | 144.11 | 1.56 | 2004/10/06 |
| C/2004 T6 | SOHO | – | 1.0 | – | 0.0049 | 143.9 | 1.74 | 2004/10/10 |
| C/2004 T7 | SOHO | – | 1.0 | – | 0.0048 | 144.15 | 4.07 | 2004/10/14 |
| C/2004 T8 | SOHO | – | 1.0 | – | 0.0048 | 144.09 | 1.33 | 2004/10/04 |
| C/2004 U4 | SOHO | – | 1.0 | – | 0.0053 | 147.82 | 356.43 | 2004/10/17 |
| C/2004 U5 | SOHO | – | 1.0 | – | 0.0063 | 138.46 | 331.03 | 2004/10/21 |
| C/2004 U6 | SOHO | – | 1.0 | – | 0.0052 | 139.47 | 323.07 | 2004/10/21 |
| C/2004 U7 | SOHO | – | 1.0 | – | 0.0052 | 144.58 | 11.41 | 2004/10/22 |
| C/2004 U8 | SOHO | – | 1.0 | – | 0.0049 | 143.92 | 2.93 | 2004/10/24 |
| C/2004 U9 | SOHO | – | 1.0 | – | 0.005 | 143.62 | 4.27 | 2004/10/26 |
| C/2004 U10 | SOHO | – | 1.0 | – | 0.0076 | 143.74 | 9.44 | 2004/10/26 |
| C/2004 U11 | SOHO | – | 1.0 | – | 0.0048 | 144.58 | 7.41 | 2004/10/28 |
| C/2004 U12 | SOHO | – | 1.0 | – | 0.0049 | 147.11 | 358.95 | 2004/10/28 |
| C/2004 V6 | SOHO | – | 1.0 | – | 0.0053 | 142.98 | 12.84 | 2004/11/04 |
| C/2004 V7 | SOHO | – | 1.0 | – | 0.0051 | 143.83 | 11.45 | 2004/11/04 |
| C/2004 V8 | SOHO | – | 1.0 | – | 0.0049 | 144.46 | 7.62 | 2004/11/08 |
| C/2004 V11 | SOHO | – | 1.0 | – | 0.005 | 143.29 | 6.52 | 2004/11/09 |
| C/2004 V12 | SOHO | – | 1.0 | – | 0.0049 | 143.89 | 4.87 | 2004/11/11 |
| C/2004 V14 | SOHO | – | 1.0 | – | 0.0049 | 143.84 | 4.48 | 2004/11/14 |
| C/2004 V15 | SOHO | – | 1.0 | – | 0.0082 | 141.29 | 341.45 | 2004/11/16 |
| C/2004 W1 | SOHO | – | 1.0 | – | 0.0052 | 143.27 | 15.3 | 2004/11/16 |
| C/2004 W2 | SOHO | – | 1.0 | – | 0.0053 | 142.14 | 15.07 | 2004/11/19 |
| C/2004 W3 | SOHO | – | 1.0 | – | 0.007 | 143.89 | 9.7 | 2004/11/20 |
| C/2004 W4 | SOHO | – | 1.0 | – | 0.005 | 143.41 | 15.21 | 2004/11/22 |
| C/2004 W5 | SOHO | – | 1.0 | – | 0.0051 | 141.14 | 12.23 | 2004/11/22 |
| C/2004 W6 | SOHO | – | 1.0 | – | 0.0056 | 142.69 | 11.82 | 2004/11/23 |
| C/2004 W7 | SOHO | – | 1.0 | – | 0.0048 | 143.05 | 8.85 | 2004/11/25 |
| C/2004 W8 | SOHO | – | 1.0 | – | 0.0051 | 141.74 | 13.85 | 2004/11/24 |
| C/2004 W9 | SOHO | – | 1.0 | – | 0.0049 | 140.5 | 21.98 | 2004/11/28 |
| C/2004 W11 | SOHO | – | 1.0 | – | 0.0051 | 142.57 | 11.3 | 2004/12/01 |
| – | SOHO-4766 | – | 1.0 | – | – | – | – | 2004/12/02 |
| C/2004 X4 | SOHO | – | 1.0 | – | 0.0049 | 143.47 | 12.18 | 2004/12/03 |
| C/2004 X5 | SOHO | – | 1.0 | – | 0.0065 | 144.99 | 4.84 | 2004/12/05 |
| C/2004 X6 | SOHO | – | 1.0 | – | 0.007 | 140.85 | 18.43 | 2004/12/07 |
| C/2004 X8 | SOHO | – | 1.0 | – | 0.0052 | 144.22 | 7.14 | 2004/12/09 |
| C/2004 X9 | SOHO | – | 1.0 | – | 0.0054 | 144.06 | 6.6 | 2004/12/13 |
| C/2004 X10 | SOHO | – | 1.0 | – | 0.0057 | 146.26 | 352.06 | 2004/12/13 |
| C/2004 X11 | SOHO | – | 1.0 | – | 0.0048 | 145.35 | 349.13 | 2004/12/14 |
| C/2004 Y2 | SOHO | – | 1.0 | – | 0.0051 | 131.81 | 349.99 | 2004/12/19 |
| C/2004 Y3 | SOHO | – | 1.0 | – | 0.0048 | 144.69 | 5.17 | 2004/12/25 |
| C/2004 Y5 | SOHO | – | 1.0 | – | 0.0048 | 144.31 | 350.47 | 2004/12/26 |
| C/2004 Y6 | SOHO | – | 1.0 | – | 0.0073 | 144.5 | 325.97 | 2004/12/26 |
| C/2004 Y7 | SOHO | – | 1.0 | – | 0.0049 | 143.73 | 14.41 | 2004/12/26 |
| C/2004 Y8 | SOHO | – | 1.0 | – | 0.007 | 140.65 | 349.33 | 2004/12/27 |
| C/2004 Y9 | SOHO | – | 1.0 | – | 0.0052 | 147.38 | 356.27 | 2004/12/28 |
| C/2004 Y11 | SOHO | – | 1.0 | – | 0.0048 | 145.33 | 352.02 | 2004/12/29 |
| C/2004 Y12 | SOHO | – | 1.0 | – | 0.005 | 144.24 | 0.58 | 2005/01/01 |

=== 2005 ===
| Comet designation | Name/ discoverer(s) | Period (years) | e | a (AU) | q (AU) | i (°) | Node (°) | Perihelion date |
|---|---|---|---|---|---|---|---|---|
| C/2005 A2 | SOHO-897 | – | 1.0 | – | 0.0055 | 144.27 | 345.46 | 2005/01/04 |
| C/2005 A3 | SOHO-898 | – | 1.0 | – | 0.0067 | 133.47 | 327 | 2005/01/07 |
| C/2005 A4 | SOHO-899 | – | 1.0 | – | 0.0067 | 138.96 | 337.99 | 2005/01/14 |
| C/2005 A5 | SOHO-900 | – | 1.0 | – | 0.0048 | 144.05 | 358.6 | 2005/01/15 |
| C/2005 B2 | SOHO-901 | – | 1.0 | – | 0.005 | 145.06 | 5.23 | 2005/01/26 |
| C/2005 B3 | SOHO-902 | – | 1.0 | – | 0.0049 | 144.34 | 355.04 | 2005/01/27 |
| C/2005 B5 | SOHO-1293 | – | 1.0 | – | 0.0048 | 144.36 | 354.2 | 2005/01/22 |
| C/2005 B6 | SOHO-1294 | – | 1.0 | – | 0.0051 | 142.81 | 3.12 | 2005/01/31 |
| C/2005 C2 | SOHO-906 | – | 1.0 | – | 0.005 | 145.85 | 354.11 | 2005/02/02 |
| C/2005 C3 | SOHO-907 | – | 1.0 | – | 0.0049 | 144.8 | 6.45 | 2005/02/08 |
| C/2005 D2 | SOHO-909 | – | 1.0 | – | 0.0066 | 144.99 | 3.06 | 2005/02/22 |
| C/2005 D3 | SOHO-910 | – | 1.0 | – | 0.007 | 144.22 | 355.24 | 2005/02/23 |
| C/2005 D4 | SOHO-912 | – | 1.0 | – | 0.0049 | 144.28 | 0.75 | 2005/02/26 |
| C/2005 D5 | SOHO-913 | – | 1.0 | – | 0.0056 | 143.74 | 357.61 | 2005/02/27 |
| C/2005 E3 | SOHO-914 | – | 1.0 | – | 0.005 | 140.29 | 343.12 | 2005/03/06 |
| – | SOHO-4781 | – | 1.0 | – | – | – | – | 2005/03/10 |
| C/2005 E5 | SOHO-916 | – | 1.0 | – | 0.0051 | 144.41 | 359.09 | 2005/03/12 |
| C/2005 E6 | SOHO-917 | – | 1.0 | – | 0.0048 | 144.09 | 359.69 | 2005/03/15 |
| C/2005 E7 | SOHO-918 | – | 1.0 | – | 0.0052 | 139.37 | 331.02 | 2005/03/14 |
| C/2005 E8 | SOHO-919 | – | 1.0 | – | 0.0048 | 144.3 | 0.86 | 2005/03/15 |
| C/2005 E9 | SOHO-924 | – | 1.0 | – | 0.005 | 143.53 | 358.7 | 2005/03/15 |
| C/2005 F1 | SOHO-925 | – | 1.0 | – | 0.0055 | 144.16 | 359.66 | 2005/03/18 |
| C/2005 F2 | SOHO-926 | – | 1.0 | – | 0.0067 | 144.2 | 359.46 | 2005/03/19 |
| C/2005 F3 | SOHO-932 | – | 1.0 | – | 0.0049 | 143.96 | 350.21 | 2005/03/28 |
| C/2005 F4 | SOHO-933 | – | 1.0 | – | 0.0068 | 144.14 | 1.21 | 2005/03/29 |
| C/2005 F5 | SOHO-934 | – | 1.0 | – | 0.0051 | 144.09 | 0.74 | 2005/03/28 |
| C/2005 G3 | SOHO-935 | – | 1.0 | – | 0.0091 | 136.42 | 354.27 | 2005/04/04 |
| C/2005 G4 | SOHO-936 | – | 1.0 | – | 0.0051 | 144.19 | 350.04 | 2005/04/08 |
| C/2005 G5 | SOHO-937 | – | 1.0 | – | 0.0051 | 143.61 | 3.14 | 2005/04/10 |
| C/2005 G6 | SOHO-938 | – | 1.0 | – | 0.0048 | 144.05 | 0.57 | 2005/04/12 |
| C/2005 G7 | SOHO-940 | – | 1.0 | – | 0.0049 | 143.44 | 2.54 | 2005/04/14 |
| C/2005 H3 | SOHO-944 | – | 1.0 | – | 0.0049 | 143.82 | 2.45 | 2005/04/22 |
| C/2005 H4 | SOHO-945 | – | 1.0 | – | 0.0051 | 143.18 | 2.71 | 2005/04/22 |
| C/2005 H5 | SOHO-946 | – | 1.0 | – | 0.0052 | 144.13 | 8.18 | 2005/04/25 |
| C/2005 H6 | SOHO-947 | – | 1.0 | – | 0.0049 | 138.19 | 309.11 | 2005/04/25 |
| C/2005 H8 | SOHO-948 | – | 1.0 | – | 0.0051 | 145.75 | 0.59 | 2005/04/26 |
| C/2005 J3 | SOHO-951 | – | 1.0 | – | 0.0051 | 144.25 | 0.41 | 2005/05/03 |
| C/2005 J4 | SOHO-952 | – | 1.0 | – | 0.0051 | 146.7 | 356.52 | 2005/05/06 |
| C/2005 J5 | SOHO-953 | – | 1.0 | – | 0.005 | 144.14 | 12.3 | 2005/05/09 |
| C/2005 J6 | SOHO-954 | – | 1.0 | – | 0.0055 | 142.26 | 9.26 | 2005/05/10 |
| C/2005 J7 | SOHO-955 | – | 1.0 | – | 0.0049 | 143.58 | 4.84 | 2005/05/12 |
| C/2005 J8 | SOHO-956 | – | 1.0 | – | 0.0051 | 144.05 | 4.37 | 2005/05/13 |
| C/2005 J9 | SOHO-957 | – | 1.0 | – | 0.0051 | 143.6 | 17.07 | 2005/05/14 |
| C/2005 J10 | SOHO-958 | – | 1.0 | – | 0.0051 | 143.02 | 9.56 | 2005/05/14 |
| C/2005 J11 | SOHO-959 | – | 1.0 | – | 0.0051 | 142.69 | 7.81 | 2005/05/15 |
| C/2005 J12 | SOHO-960 | – | 1.0 | – | 0.0051 | 142.89 | 7.95 | 2005/05/16 |
| C/2005 K5 | SOHO-962 | – | 1.0 | – | 0.0051 | 142.25 | 9.16 | 2005/05/19 |
| C/2005 K6 | SOHO-963 | – | 1.0 | – | 0.0051 | 143.85 | 2 | 2005/05/20 |
| C/2005 K7 | SOHO-964 | – | 1.0 | – | 0.005 | 142 | 17.59 | 2005/05/20 |
| C/2005 K8 | SOHO-965 | – | 1.0 | – | 0.005 | 144.36 | 6.51 | 2005/05/20 |
| C/2005 K10 | SOHO-969 | – | 1.0 | – | 0.0049 | 140.99 | 15.81 | 2005/05/30 |
| C/2005 L5 | SOHO-970 | – | 1.0 | – | 0.005 | 142.27 | 18.49 | 2005/06/01 |
| C/2005 L6 | SOHO-971 | – | 1.0 | – | 0.0049 | 146.03 | 330.17 | 2005/06/06 |
| C/2005 L7 | SOHO-972 | – | 1.0 | – | 0.0046 | 144.13 | 358.74 | 2005/06/07 |
| C/2005 L8 | SOHO-973 | – | 1.0 | – | 0.0052 | 135.79 | 29.42 | 2005/06/06 |
| C/2005 L9 | SOHO-974 | – | 1.0 | – | 0.0043 | 143.74 | 3.08 | 2005/06/07 |
| – | SOHO-4768 | – | 1.0 | – | – | – | – | 2005/06/08 |
| C/2005 L10 | SOHO-975 | – | 1.0 | – | 0.0073 | 128.3 | 40.68 | 2005/06/10 |
| C/2005 L11 | SOHO-976 | – | 1.0 | – | 0.0048 | 143.83 | 3.97 | 2005/06/10 |
| C/2005 L12 | SOHO-977 | – | 1.0 | – | 0.0042 | 144.65 | 354.57 | 2005/06/12 |
| C/2005 L13 | SOHO-978 | – | 1.0 | – | 0.0073 | 138.48 | 334.5 | 2005/06/12 |
| C/2005 L14 | SOHO-979 | – | 1.0 | – | 0.0053 | 143.71 | 7.7 | 2005/06/13 |
| C/2005 L15 | SOHO-980 | – | 1.0 | – | 0.0048 | 142.96 | 334 | 2005/06/17 |
| C/2005 M2 | SOHO-982 | – | 1.0 | – | 0.0048 | 144.19 | 1.26 | 2005/06/17 |
| C/2005 M4 | SOHO-984 | – | 1.0 | – | 0.0048 | 143.26 | 4.47 | 2005/06/21 |
| C/2005 M5 | SOHO-983 | – | 1.0 | – | 0.0048 | 144.93 | 341.52 | 2005/06/21 |
| C/2005 M6 | SOHO-985 | – | 1.0 | – | 0.0049 | 145.41 | 341.9 | 2005/06/25 |
| C/2005 M7 | SOHO-986 | – | 1.0 | – | 0.0048 | 144.81 | 347.55 | 2005/06/26 |
| C/2005 M8 | SOHO-987 | – | 1.0 | – | 0.0065 | 146.71 | 337.42 | 2005/06/28 |
| C/2005 M9 | SOHO-988 | – | 1.0 | – | 0.0048 | 144.64 | 345.73 | 2005/06/28 |
| C/2005 M10 | SOHO-989 | – | 1.0 | – | 0.0051 | 145 | 346 | 2005/06/29 |
| C/2005 N6 | SOHO-990 | – | 1.0 | – | 0.0051 | 145.55 | 344.03 | 2005/07/06 |
| C/2005 N7 | SOHO-991 | – | 1.0 | – | 0.0048 | 144.42 | 6.93 | 2005/07/13 |
| C/2005 N8 | SOHO-992 | – | 1.0 | – | 0.0049 | 133.68 | 15.58 | 2005/07/13 |
| C/2005 N9 | SOHO-993 | – | 1.0 | – | 0.0049 | 144.46 | 353.94 | 2005/07/14 |
| C/2005 N10 | SOHO-994 | – | 1.0 | – | 0.0058 | 138.69 | 344.17 | 2005/07/14 |
| C/2005 O3 | SOHO-995 | – | 1.0 | – | 0.005 | 144.1 | 0.93 | 2005/07/23 |
| C/2005 O4 | SOHO-996 | – | 1.0 | – | 0.0051 | 144.82 | 4.88 | 2005/07/256 |
| C/2005 O6 | SOHO-997 | – | 1.0 | – | 0.0048 | 144.34 | 356.56 | 2005/07/27 |
| C/2005 P1 | SOHO-999 | – | 1.0 | – | 0.0049 | 144.54 | 6.32 | 2005/08/06 |
| C/2005 P2 | SOHO-1000 | – | 1.0 | – | 0.0048 | 144.43 | 357.47 | 2005/08/06 |
| C/2005 P4 | SOHO-1001 | – | 1.0 | – | 0.0048 | 143.97 | 1.47 | 2005/08/12 |
| C/2005 P5 | SOHO-1002 | – | 1.0 | – | 0.0049 | 141.82 | 16.35 | 2005/08/13 |
| C/2005 P6 | SOHO-1003 | – | 1.0 | – | 0.005 | 143.88 | 359.19 | 2005/08/14 |
| C/2005 Q5 | SOHO-1004 | – | 1.0 | – | 0.0048 | 144.55 | 7.08 | 2005/08/18 |
| C/2005 Q7 | SOHO-1007 | – | 1.0 | – | 0.0048 | 143.97 | 1.38 | 2005/08/25 |
| C/2005 Q9 | SOHO-1009 | – | 1.0 | – | 0.0051 | 144.71 | 5.66 | 2005/08/30 |
| C/2005 Q10 | SOHO-1010 | – | 1.0 | – | 0.0048 | 144.21 | 1.18 | 2005/08/31 |
| C/2005 R5 | SOHO-1013 | – | 1.0 | – | 0.0051 | 143.62 | 357.96 | 2005/09/06 |
| C/2005 R6 | SOHO-1014 | – | 1.0 | – | 0.0053 | 142.24 | 3.29 | 2005/09/06 |
| C/2005 R7 | SOHO-1015 | – | 1.0 | – | 0.0049 | 144.12 | 359.63 | 2005/09/16 |
| C/2005 S1 | SOHO-1024 | – | 1.0 | – | 0.0048 | 144.2 | 2.01 | 2005/09/29 |
| C/2005 S5 | SOHO-1016 | – | 1.0 | – | 0.0048 | 132.02 | 311.81 | 2005/09/19 |
| C/2005 S6 | SOHO-1017 | – | 1.0 | – | 0.0048 | 144.11 | 0.03 | 2005/09/21 |
| C/2005 S7 | SOHO-1019 | – | 1.0 | – | 0.0048 | 144.11 | 8.13 | 2005/09/23 |
| C/2005 S8 | SOHO-1018 | – | 1.0 | – | 0.0049 | 144.22 | 7.89 | 2005/09/24 |
| C/2005 S9 | SOHO-1020 | – | 1.0 | – | 0.0098 | 144.67 | 4.21 | 2005/09/25 |
| C/2005 S10 | SOHO-1022 | – | 1.0 | – | 0.0052 | 144.09 | 359.92 | 2005/09/25 |
| C/2005 S11 | SOHO-1021 | – | 1.0 | – | 0.0089 | 145.39 | 6.64 | 2005/09/25 |
| C/2005 S12 | SOHO-1023 | – | 1.0 | – | 0.0069 | 145.12 | 5.09 | 2005/09/26 |
| C/2005 S13 | SOHO-1025 | – | 1.0 | – | 0.0073 | 144.65 | 6.31 | 2005/09/30 |
| C/2005 T6 | SOHO-1026 | – | 1.0 | – | 0.0061 | 143.98 | 3.27 | 2005/10/02 |
| C/2005 T7 | SOHO-1027 | – | 1.0 | – | 0.0048 | 144.41 | 358.09 | 2005/10/05 |
| C/2005 T8 | SOHO-1028 | – | 1.0 | – | 0.0052 | 145.25 | 3.30 | 2005/10/07 |
| C/2005 T10 | SOHO-1030 | – | 1.0 | – | 0.0051 | 145.16 | 3.3 | 2005/10/15 |
| C/2005 T11 | SOHO-1031 | – | 1.0 | – | 0.0072 | 138.74 | 355.94 | 2005/10/16 |
| C/2005 T12 | SOHO | – | 1.0 | – | 0.0055 | 143.98 | 0.68 | 2005/10/18 |
| C/2005 U2 | SOHO-1032 | – | 1.0 | – | 0.0055 | – | – | 2005/10/18 |
| C/2005 U3 | SOHO-1033 | – | 1.0 | – | 0.0052 | 144.45 | 6.83 | 2005/10/19 |
| C/2005 U4 | SOHO-1034 | – | 1.0 | – | 0.0051 | 144.83 | 359.13 | 2005/10/19 |
| C/2005 U5 | SOHO-1035 | – | 1.0 | – | 0.0049 | 131.09 | 319.04 | 2005/10/22 |
| C/2005 U6 | SOHO-1036 | – | 1.0 | – | 0.0056 | 143.53 | 4.01 | 2005/10/24 |
| C/2005 U7 | SOHO-1037 | – | 1.0 | – | 0.0051 | 145.51 | 10.08 | 2005/10/24 |
| C/2005 U8 | SOHO-1039 | – | 1.0 | – | 0.0053 | 149.1 | 344.14 | 2005/10/30 |
| C/2005 V2 | SOHO-1040 | – | 1.0 | – | 0.0051 | 146.79 | 354.9 | 2005/11/03 |
| C/2005 V3 | SOHO-1041 | – | 1.0 | – | 0.0049 | 145.24 | 4 | 2005/11/04 |
| C/2005 V4 | SOHO-1042 | – | 1.0 | – | 0.0049 | 143.53 | 3.19 | 2005/11/05 |
| C/2005 V5 | SOHO-1043 | – | 1.0 | – | 0.0051 | 146.95 | 354.74 | 2005/11/08 |
| C/2005 V6 | SOHO-1044 | – | 1.0 | – | 0.0052 | 143.96 | 1.28 | 2005/11/09 |
| C/2005 V7 | SOHO-1045 | – | 1.0 | – | 0.005 | 144.16 | 7.85 | 2005/11/09 |
| C/2005 V9 | SOHO-1047 | – | 1.0 | – | 0.0073 | 138.75 | 337.13 | 2005/11/14 |
| – | SOHO-4770 | – | 1.0 | – | – | – | – | 2005/11/17 |
| C/2005 W6 | SOHO-1049 | – | 1.0 | – | 0.0078 | 130.87 | 315.75 | 2005/11/19 |
| C/2005 W7 | SOHO-1050 | – | 1.0 | – | 0.0052 | 143.78 | 3.21 | 2005/11/20 |
| C/2005 W8 | SOHO-1051 | – | 1.0 | – | 0.0049 | 143.26 | 7.07 | 2005/11/20 |
| C/2005 W10 | SOHO-1052 | – | 1.0 | – | 0.005 | 145.65 | 5.51 | 2005/11/20 |
| C/2005 W12 | SOHO-1055 | – | 1.0 | – | 0.0051 | 143.34 | 6.21 | 2005/11/20 |
| C/2005 W13 | SOHO-1056 | – | 1.0 | – | 0.0049 | 144.16 | 11.12 | 2005/11/22 |
| C/2005 W14 | SOHO-1058 | – | 1.0 | – | 0.0049 | 143.15 | 6.22 | 2005/11/24 |
| C/2005 W15 | SOHO-1059 | – | 1.0 | – | 0.0066 | 134.01 | 334.45 | 2005/11/25 |
| C/2005 W16 | SOHO-1060 | – | 1.0 | – | 0.0044 | 143.71 | 7.2 | 2005/11/29 |
| C/2005 W17 | SOHO-1061 | – | 1.0 | – | 0.005 | 141.91 | 19.02 | 2005/11/30 |
| – | SOHO-4885 | – | 1.0 | – | – | – | – | 2005/12/01 |
| C/2005 X2 | SOHO-1063 | – | 1.0 | – | 0.0051 | 143.32 | 14.98 | 2005/12/03 |
| C/2005 X3 | SOHO-1064 | – | 1.0 | – | 0.005 | 142.42 | 14.92 | 2005/12/05 |
| C/2005 X4 | SOHO-1065 | – | 1.0 | – | 0.0051 | 136.44 | 27.46 | 2005/12/06 |
| – | SOHO-4771 | – | 1.0 | – | – | – | – | 2005/12/08 |
| C/2005 X5 | SOHO-1066 | – | 1.0 | – | 0.0044 | 144.07 | 359.85 | 2005/12/09 |
| C/2005 X6 | SOHO-1067 | – | 1.0 | – | 0.005 | 144.32 | 326.76 | 2005/12/08 |
| C/2005 X7 | SOHO-1068 | – | 1.0 | – | 0.0072 | 141.12 | 16.19 | 2005/12/09 |
| – | SOHO-4772 | – | 1.0 | – | – | – | – | 2005/12/09 |
| C/2005 X8 | SOHO-1069 | – | 1.0 | – | 0.0049 | 141.71 | 13.45 | 2005/12/12 |
| C/2005 X9 | SOHO-1070 | – | 1.0 | – | 0.0049 | 144.99 | 344.26 | 2005/12/13 |
| – | SOHO-4773 | – | 1.0 | – | – | – | – | 2005/12/14 |
| C/2005 Y3 | SOHO-1072 | – | 1.0 | – | 0.0048 | 145.83 | 0.61 | 2005/12/20 |
| C/2005 Y4 | SOHO-1073 | – | 1.0 | – | 0.005 | 145.19 | 5.31 | 2005/12/21 |
| C/2005 Y5 | SOHO-1074 | – | 1.0 | – | 0.0049 | 145.6 | 349.4 | 2005/12/22 |
| C/2005 Y6 | SOHO-1075 | – | 1.0 | – | 0.007 | 142.57 | 322.9 | 2005/12/22 |
| C/2005 Y7 | SOHO-1077 | – | 1.0 | – | 0.008 | 138.58 | 330.5 | 2005/12/25 |
| C/2005 Y9 | SOHO-1078 | – | 1.0 | – | 0.0043 | 144.25 | 358.88 | 2005/12/27 |
| C/2005 Y10 | SOHO-1079 | – | 1.0 | – | 0.0051 | 146.58 | 344.36 | 2005/12/27 |
| – | SOHO-4774 | – | 1.0 | – | – | – | – | 2005/12/28 |

=== 2006 ===
| Comet designation | Name/ discoverer(s) | Period (years) | e | a (AU) | q (AU) | i (°) | Node (°) | Perihelion date |
|---|---|---|---|---|---|---|---|---|
| C/2006 A4 | SOHO-1086 | – | 1.0 | – | 0.0053 | 145 | 2.44 | 2006/01/03 |
| C/2006 A5 | SOHO-1087 | – | 1.0 | – | 0.0043 | 144.04 | 0.54 | 2006/01/05 |
| C/2006 A6 | SOHO-1088 | – | 1.0 | – | 0.0056 | 141.39 | 18.64 | 2006/01/10 |
| C/2006 A7 | SOHO-1089 | – | 1.0 | – | 0.0049 | 144.6 | 357.27 | 2006/01/13 |
| C/2006 A8 | SOHO-1295 | – | 1.0 | – | 0.0048 | 142.09 | 16.06 | 2006/01/10 |
| C/2006 B2 | SOHO-1090 | – | 1.0 | – | 0.0051 | 145.51 | 4.41 | 2006/01/20 |
| C/2006 B3 | SOHO-1091 | – | 1.0 | – | 0.0052 | 144.43 | 358.51 | 2006/01/22 |
| C/2006 B5 | SOHO-1093 | – | 1.0 | – | 0.005 | 142.24 | 6.38 | 2006/01/27 |
| C/2006 B6 | SOHO-1094 | – | 1.0 | – | 0.0061 | 144.5 | 354.83 | 2006/01/31 |
| C/2006 C1 | SOHO-1097 | – | 1.0 | – | 0.0049 | 144.51 | 5.53 | 2006/02/08 |
| C/2006 C2 | SOHO-1098 | – | 1.0 | – | 0.0061 | 144.21 | 353.05 | 2006/02/10 |
| C/2006 C3 | SOHO-1099 | – | 1.0 | – | 0.0052 | 143.92 | 355.47 | 2006/02/11 |
| C/2006 D2 | SOHO-1100 | – | 1.0 | – | 0.005 | 139.04 | 337.16 | 2006/02/17 |
| C/2006 D3 | SOHO-1103 | – | 1.0 | – | 0.005 | 138.84 | 3.54 | 2006/02/20 |
| C/2006 D4 | SOHO-1104 | – | 1.0 | – | 0.0052 | 143.98 | 0.22 | 2006/02/21 |
| C/2006 D5 | SOHO-1105 | – | 1.0 | – | 0.0049 | 144.47 | 357.95 | 2006/02/27 |
| C/2006 D6 | SOHO-1106 | – | 1.0 | – | 0.0054 | 144.32 | 357.28 | 2006/03/01 |
| – | SOHO-4782 | – | 1.0 | – | – | – | – | 2006/03/01 |
| – | SOHO-4783 | – | 1.0 | – | – | – | – | 2006/03/03 |
| – | SOHO-4784 | – | 1.0 | – | – | – | – | 2006/03/10 |
| C/2006 E3 | SOHO-1111 | – | 1.0 | – | 0.007 | 144.19 | 357.72 | 2006/03/13 |
| C/2006 E4 | SOHO-1112 | – | 1.0 | – | 0.0051 | 136.56 | 18.49 | 2006/03/15 |
| C/2006 F5 | SOHO-1114 | – | 1.0 | – | 0.005 | 144.57 | 4.2 | 2006/03/21 |
| C/2006 F7 | SOHO-1118 | – | 1.0 | – | 0.005 | 145.72 | 3.42 | 2006/03/28 |
| C/2006 F8 | SOHO-1119 | – | 1.0 | – | 0.0052 | 144.58 | 5.67 | 2006/03/31 |
| C/2006 G2 | SOHO-1120 | – | 1.0 | – | 0.0051 | 148.07 | 353.13 | 2006/04/11 |
| C/2006 G3 | SOHO-1121 | – | 1.0 | – | 0.0049 | 144.38 | 359.35 | 2006/04/14 |
| C/2006 H2 | SOHO-1122 | – | 1.0 | – | 0.0051 | 145.5 | 0 | 2006/04/17 |
| C/2006 H3 | SOHO-1123 | – | 1.0 | – | 0.005 | 143.75 | 2.74 | 2006/04/19 |
| C/2006 H4 | SOHO-1124 | – | 1.0 | – | 0.0048 | 143.82 | 0.7 | 2006/04/22 |
| – | SOHO-4775 | – | 1.0 | – | – | – | – | 2006/04/22 |
| – | SOHO-4776 | – | 1.0 | – | – | – | – | 2006/04/23 |
| C/2006 H5 | SOHO-1125 | – | 1.0 | – | 0.0052 | 143.01 | 3.47 | 2006/04/24 |
| C/2006 H6 | SOHO-1126 | – | 1.0 | – | 0.0049 | 143.95 | 4.09 | 2006/04/28 |
| C/2006 J1 | SOHO-1127 | – | 1.0 | – | 0.007 | 143.58 | 348.56 | 2006/05/03 |
| C/2006 J2 | SOHO-1128 | – | 1.0 | – | 0.0051 | 143.55 | 1.27 | 2006/05/04 |
| C/2006 J3 | SOHO-1129 | – | 1.0 | – | 0.0049 | 144.61 | 5.68 | 2006/05/04 |
| C/2006 J4 | SOHO-1130 | – | 1.0 | – | 0.005 | 144.47 | 5.85 | 2006/05/09 |
| C/2006 J6 | SOHO-1132 | – | 1.0 | – | 0.0051 | 143.9 | 2.91 | 2006/05/09 |
| C/2006 J7 | SOHO-1133 | – | 1.0 | – | 0.005 | 143.39 | 5.04 | 2006/05/10 |
| C/2006 J8 | SOHO-1134 | – | 1.0 | – | 0.005 | 143.07 | 3.86 | 2006/05/10 |
| C/2006 J9 | SOHO-1135 | – | 1.0 | – | 0.0055 | 143.37 | 9.93 | 2006/05/10 |
| C/2006 J10 | SOHO-1136 | – | 1.0 | – | 0.0057 | 146.41 | 356.7 | 2006/05/11 |
| C/2006 J11 | SOHO-1137 | – | 1.0 | – | 0.0049 | 142.16 | 6.41 | 2006/05/12 |
| C/2006 J12 | SOHO-1138 | – | 1.0 | – | 0.0087 | 141.01 | 15.99 | 2006/05/16 |
| C/2006 K6 | SOHO-1139 | – | 1.0 | – | 0.0067 | 144.88 | 4.62 | 2006/05/17 |
| C/2006 K7 | SOHO-1140 | – | 1.0 | – | 0.0066 | 141.16 | 14.54 | 2006/05/18 |
| C/2006 K8 | SOHO-1141 | – | 1.0 | – | 0.0049 | 143.53 | 13.5 | 2006/05/19 |
| C/2006 K9 | SOHO-1142 | – | 1.0 | – | 0.0083 | 141.26 | 14.16 | 2006/05/20 |
| C/2006 K10 | SOHO-1143 | – | 1.0 | – | 0.0049 | 143.55 | 4.77 | 2006/05/20 |
| C/2006 K11 | SOHO-1145 | – | 1.0 | – | 0.0058 | 142.79 | 7.62 | 2006/05/23 |
| C/2006 K12 | SOHO-1146 | – | 1.0 | – | 0.0054 | 143.13 | 0.13 | 2006/05/23 |
| C/2006 K13 | SOHO-1148 | – | 1.0 | – | 0.0052 | 143.29 | 5.31 | 2006/05/24 |
| C/2006 K14 | SOHO-1149 | – | 1.0 | – | 0.0052 | 142.57 | 6.05 | 2006/05/24 |
| C/2006 K15 | SOHO-1150 | – | 1.0 | – | 0.0064 | 140.72 | 17.35 | 2006/05/25 |
| C/2006 K16 | SOHO-1151 | – | 1.0 | – | 0.005 | 142.46 | 9.02 | 2006/05/26 |
| C/2006 K17 | SOHO-1152 | – | 1.0 | – | 0.0051 | 141.34 | 15.29 | 2006/05/26 |
| C/2006 K18 | SOHO-1153 | – | 1.0 | – | 0.0071 | 143.81 | 8.77 | 2006/05/26 |
| C/2006 K19 | SOHO-1154 | – | 1.0 | – | 0.0053 | 142.77 | 6.41 | 2006/05/29 |
| C/2006 K20 | SOHO-1155 | – | 1.0 | – | 0.0053 | 141.71 | 11.5 | 2006/05/29 |
| C/2006 K21 | SOHO-1156 | – | 1.0 | – | 0.0049 | 144.63 | 4.79 | 2006/05/31 |
| C/2006 L3 | SOHO-1158 | – | 1.0 | – | 0.0049 | 140.31 | 15.42 | 2006/06/02 |
| C/2006 L4 | SOHO-1159 | – | 1.0 | – | 0.005 | 146.71 | 345.24 | 2006/06/05 |
| C/2006 L5 | SOHO-1161 | – | 1.0 | – | 0.0062 | 143.97 | 333.2 | 2006/06/08 |
| C/2006 L6 | SOHO-1162 | – | 1.0 | – | 0.005 | 138.43 | 22.17 | 2006/06/09 |
| C/2006 L7 | SOHO-1163 | – | 1.0 | – | 0.005 | 126.64 | 17.51 | 2006/06/10 |
| C/2006 L8 | SOHO-1164 | – | 1.0 | – | 0.0049 | 140.61 | 317.61 | 2006/06/14 |
| C/2006 M5 | SOHO-1165 | – | 1.0 | – | 0.0049 | 130.31 | 37.31 | 2006/06/17 |
| C/2006 M6 | SOHO-1166 | – | 1.0 | – | 0.0049 | 130.4 | 41.24 | 2006/06/19 |
| C/2006 M7 | SOHO-1167 | – | 1.0 | – | 0.0049 | 144.97 | 356.1 | 2006/06/22 |
| C/2006 M8 | SOHO-1169 | – | 1.0 | – | 0.0079 | 145.12 | 325.64 | 2006/06/25 |
| C/2006 M9 | SOHO | – | 1.0 | – | 0.0049 | 144.81 | 3.37 | 2006/06/27 |
| C/2006 N1 | SOHO-1171 | – | 1.0 | – | 0.0056 | 145.2 | 346.6 | 2006/07/12 |
| C/2006 N2 | SOHO-1172 | – | 1.0 | – | 0.0073 | 144.87 | 4.27 | 2006/07/14 |
| C/2006 N3 | SOHO-1173 | – | 1.0 | – | 0.0057 | 130.11 | 318.52 | 2006/07/15 |
| C/2006 O3 | SOHO-1174 | – | 1.0 | – | 0.0064 | 146.75 | 353.43 | 2006/07/17 |
| C/2006 O4 | SOHO-1175 | – | 1.0 | – | 0.0057 | 138.72 | 342.68 | 2006/07/20 |
| C/2006 O5 | SOHO-1176 | – | 1.0 | – | 0.0079 | 132.33 | 319.03 | 2006/07/22 |
| C/2006 O6 | SOHO-1177 | – | 1.0 | – | 0.0049 | 144.2 | 356.06 | 2006/07/24 |
| C/2006 O7 | SOHO-1178 | – | 1.0 | – | 0.0055 | 144.24 | 357.01 | 2006/07/27 |
| C/2006 O8 | SOHO-1179 | – | 1.0 | – | 0.0052 | 145.19 | 3.71 | 2006/07/27 |
| C/2006 P2 | SOHO-1180 | – | 1.0 | – | 0.0051 | 144.3 | 358.59 | 2006/08/02 |
| C/2006 P3 | SOHO-1181 | – | 1.0 | – | 0.005 | 144.02 | 357.5 | 2006/08/03 |
| C/2006 P4 | SOHO-1182 | – | 1.0 | – | 0.005 | 144.56 | 5.33 | 2006/08/03 |
| C/2006 P5 | SOHO-1183 | – | 1.0 | – | 0.005 | 136.1 | 17.11 | 2006/08/03 |
| C/2006 P6 | SOHO-1184 | – | 1.0 | – | 0.0072 | 144 | 355.03 | 2006/08/04 |
| C/2006 P7 | SOHO-1185 | – | 1.0 | – | 0.0051 | 144.42 | 355.69 | 2006/08/04 |
| C/2006 R4 | SOHO-1187 | – | 1.0 | – | 0.005 | 144.19 | 6.47 | 2006/09/12 |
| C/2006 S7 | SOHO-1188 | – | 1.0 | – | 0.0051 | 143.39 | 2.32 | 2006/09/19 |
| C/2006 S8 | SOHO-1192 | – | 1.0 | – | 0.0093 | 138.79 | 339.97 | 2006/09/19 |
| C/2006 S9 | SOHO-1189 | – | 1.0 | – | 0.005 | 142.99 | 357.56 | 2006/09/19 |
| C/2006 S10 | SOHO-1190 | – | 1.0 | – | 0.0049 | 143.8 | 0.41 | 2006/09/19 |
| C/2006 S11 | SOHO-1191 | – | 1.0 | – | 0.0051 | 143.98 | 1.57 | 2006/09/19 |
| C/2006 S12 | SOHO-1193 | – | 1.0 | – | 0.0052 | 144.2 | 0.27 | 2006/09/27 |
| C/2006 S13 | SOHO-1194 | – | 1.0 | – | 0.005 | 143.87 | 358.75 | 2006/09/30 |
| C/2006 T2 | SOHO-1195 | – | 1.0 | – | 0.0051 | 143.9 | 359.26 | 2006/10/03 |
| C/2006 T3 | SOHO-1196 | – | 1.0 | – | 0.0051 | 144.33 | 358.17 | 2006/10/03 |
| C/2006 T4 | SOHO-1197 | – | 1.0 | – | 0.005 | 144.52 | 357.64 | 2006/10/03 |
| C/2006 T5 | SOHO-1198 | – | 1.0 | – | 0.0049 | 142.88 | 5.66 | 2006/10/06 |
| C/2006 T7 | SOHO-1200 | – | 1.0 | – | 0.0051 | 143.7 | 10.75 | 2006/10/10 |
| C/2006 T8 | SOHO-1201 | – | 1.0 | – | 0.0052 | 144.58 | 357.19 | 2006/10/16 |
| C/2006 T9 | SOHO-1202 | – | 1.0 | – | 0.005 | 145.44 | 5.39 | 2006/10/16 |
| C/2006 T10 | SOHO-1209 | – | 1.0 | – | 0.0051 | 148.31 | 353.81 | 2006/10/12 |
| C/2006 U8 | SOHO-1203 | – | 1.0 | – | 0.005 | 137.33 | 319.52 | 2006/10/17 |
| C/2006 U9 | SOHO-1204 | – | 1.0 | – | 0.0048 | 145.39 | 3.09 | 2006/10/20 |
| C/2006 U11 | SOHO-1207 | – | 1.0 | – | 0.0053 | 144.43 | 10.23 | 2006/10/25 |
| C/2006 U12 | SOHO-1208 | – | 1.0 | – | 0.0051 | 144.51 | 1.57 | 2006/10/24 |
| C/2006 U13 | SOHO-1209 | – | 1.0 | – | 0.0051 | 146.57 | 356.9 | 2006/10/25 |
| C/2006 U14 | SOHO-1210 | – | 1.0 | – | 0.0048 | 144.88 | 4.96 | 2006/10/28 |
| C/2006 U15 | SOHO-1211 | – | 1.0 | – | 0.0051 | 144.37 | 358.99 | 2006/10/28 |
| C/2006 U16 | SOHO-1212 | – | 1.0 | – | 0.0051 | 144 | 8.59 | 2006/10/31 |
| C/2006 V2 | SOHO-1213 | – | 1.0 | – | 0.005 | 144.58 | 5.89 | 2006/11/03 |
| C/2006 V3 | SOHO-1215 | – | 1.0 | – | 0.0051 | 143.44 | 7.96 | 2006/11/03 |
| C/2006 V4 | SOHO-1216 | – | 1.0 | – | 0.0051 | 142.54 | 4.03 | 2006/11/04 |
| C/2006 V5 | SOHO-1218 | – | 1.0 | – | 0.0051 | 146.74 | 351.91 | 2006/11/07 |
| C/2006 V6 | SOHO-1219 | – | 1.0 | – | 0.0052 | 145.1 | 0.34 | 2006/11/07 |
| C/2006 V7 | SOHO-1220 | – | 1.0 | – | 0.005 | 145.17 | 0.02 | 2006/11/08 |
| C/2006 V8 | SOHO-1221 | – | 1.0 | – | 0.0063 | 146.33 | 357.76 | 2006/11/12 |
| C/2006 V9 | SOHO-1222 | – | 1.0 | – | 0.0052 | 144.4 | 6.68 | 2006/11/14 |
| C/2006 V10 | SOHO-1223 | – | 1.0 | – | 0.0051 | 144.18 | 359.31 | 2006/11/14 |
| C/2006 W5 | SOHO-1224 | – | 1.0 | – | 0.0053 | 145.02 | 311.44 | 2006/11/20 |
| C/2006 W6 | SOHO-1225 | – | 1.0 | – | 0.0052 | 146.6 | 323.33 | 2006/11/20 |
| C/2006 W7 | SOHO-1226 | – | 1.0 | – | 0.0055 | 140.72 | 14.66 | 2006/11/25 |
| C/2006 X2 | SOHO-1228 | – | 1.0 | – | 0.0055 | 137 | 28.68 | 2006/12/09 |
| C/2006 X3 | SOHO-1229 | – | 1.0 | – | 0.0052 | 139.23 | 25.84 | 2006/12/10 |
| C/2006 X4 | SOHO-1230 | – | 1.0 | – | 0.0047 | 143.31 | 14.95 | 2006/12/11 |
| C/2006 X5 | SOHO-1231 | – | 1.0 | – | 0.005 | 139.89 | 20.39 | 2006/12/10 |
| C/2006 X6 | SOHO-1232 | – | 1.0 | – | 0.0051 | 144.58 | 1.53 | 2006/12/12 |
| C/2006 X7 | SOHO-1233 | – | 1.0 | – | 0.0044 | 143.15 | 6.34 | 2006/12/12 |
| C/2006 X8 | SOHO-1234 | – | 1.0 | – | 0.0051 | 143.98 | 346.9 | 2006/12/12 |
| C/2006 X9 | SOHO-1235 | – | 1.0 | – | 0.0076 | 136.77 | 332.65 | 2006/12/15 |
| C/2006 X11 | SOHO-1237 | – | 1.0 | – | 0.0051 | 145.24 | 344.66 | 2006/12/15 |
| C/2006 Y3 | SOHO-1238 | – | 1.0 | – | 0.0077 | 147.08 | 353.37 | 2006/12/18 |
| C/2006 Y4 | SOHO-1239 | – | 1.0 | – | 0.005 | 144.5 | 350.75 | 2006/12/20 |
| C/2006 Y5 | SOHO-1240 | – | 1.0 | – | 0.0048 | 145.46 | 4.13 | 2006/12/22 |
| C/2006 Y6 | SOHO-1241 | – | 1.0 | – | 0.0048 | 145.67 | 3.67 | 2006/12/22 |
| C/2006 Y7 | SOHO-1242 | – | 1.0 | – | 0.0051 | 144.69 | 335.09 | 2006/12/22 |
| C/2006 Y8 | SOHO-1243 | – | 1.0 | – | 0.0051 | 146.07 | 347.22 | 2006/12/22 |
| C/2006 Y9 | SOHO-1244 | – | 1.0 | – | 0.005 | 144.83 | 344.25 | 2006/12/22 |
| C/2006 Y10 | SOHO-1245 | – | 1.0 | – | 0.0053 | 144.09 | 6.79 | 2006/12/23 |
| C/2006 Y11 | SOHO-1246 | – | 1.0 | – | 0.0061 | 146.99 | 343.29 | 2006/12/25 |
| C/2006 Y12 | SOHO | – | 1.0 | – | 0.0049 | 146.32 | 4.61 | 2006/12/28 |
| C/2006 Y13 | SOHO-1247 | – | 1.0 | – | 0.005 | 144.77 | 4.81 | 2006/12/28 |
| C/2006 Y14 | SOHO-1248 | – | 1.0 | – | 0.0049 | 143.82 | 8.37 | 2006/12/28 |
| C/2006 Y15 | SOHO-1250 | – | 1.0 | – | 0.0049 | 144.29 | 354.98 | 2006/12/29 |
| C/2006 Y16 | SOHO-1251 | – | 1.0 | – | 0.0049 | 145.66 | 354.78 | 2006/12/29 |
| C/2006 Y17 | SOHO-1252 | – | 1.0 | – | 0.0064 | 142.6 | 13.47 | 2006/12/30 |

=== 2007 ===
| Comet designation | Name/ discoverer(s) | Period (years) | e | a (AU) | q (AU) | i (°) | Node (°) | Perihelion date |
|---|---|---|---|---|---|---|---|---|
| C/2007 A4 | SOHO-1253 | – | 1.0 | – | 0.0049 | 144.4 | 353.01 | 2007/01/05 |
| C/2007 A5 | SOHO-1254 | – | 1.0 | – | 0.0051 | 145.38 | 2.44 | 2007/01/09 |
| C/2007 B4 | SOHO-1257 | – | 1.0 | – | 0.005 | 143.99 | 353.31 | 2007/01/18 |
| C/2007 B5 | SOHO-1258 | – | 1.0 | – | 0.0051 | 145.33 | 4.43 | 2007/01/20 |
| C/2007 B6 | SOHO-1259 | – | 1.0 | – | 0.0049 | 144.46 | 6.24 | 2007/02/01 |
| C/2007 C3 | SOHO-1260 | – | 1.0 | – | 0.0049 | 144.03 | 358.07 | 2007/02/02 |
| C/2007 C4 | SOHO-1262 | – | 1.0 | – | 0.0051 | 143.82 | 6.02 | 2007/02/03 |
| C/2007 C5 | SOHO-1263 | – | 1.0 | – | 0.0051 | 144.91 | 346.22 | 2007/02/04 |
| C/2007 C6 | SOHO-1264 | – | 1.0 | – | 0.008 | 138.61 | 334.57 | 2007/02/07 |
| C/2007 C8 | SOHO-1265 | – | 1.0 | – | 0.0052 | 144.75 | 309.4 | 2007/02/06 |
| C/2007 C9 | SOHO-1266 | – | 1.0 | – | 0.005 | 142.71 | 356.18 | 2007/02/07 |
| C/2007 C11 | SOHO-1268 | – | 1.0 | – | 0.0049 | 144.05 | 0.21 | 2007/02/08 |
| C/2007 C13 | SOHO-1270 | – | 1.0 | – | 0.0049 | 144.81 | 5.56 | 2007/02/16 |
| C/2007 D4 | SOHO-1272 | – | 1.0 | – | 0.0048 | 144.23 | 357.19 | 2007/02/17 |
| C/2007 D5 | SOHO-1273 | – | 1.0 | – | 0.005 | 144.24 | 355.51 | 2007/02/19 |
| C/2007 E4 | SOHO-1274 | – | 1.0 | – | 0.0046 | 144.36 | 356.73 | 2007/03/03 |
| C/2007 E5 | SOHO-1275 | – | 1.0 | – | 0.0048 | 145.42 | 0.56 | 2007/03/10 |
| C/2007 F2 | SOHO-1276 | – | 1.0 | – | 0.0053 | 144 | 359.24 | 2007/03/22 |
| C/2007 F3 | SOHO-1277 | – | 1.0 | – | 0.0082 | 138.39 | 337.83 | 2007/03/28 |
| C/2007 F5 | SOHO-1279 | – | 1.0 | – | 0.0086 | 144.45 | 5.76 | 2007/03/30 |
| C/2007 G2 | SOHO-1280 | – | 1.0 | – | 0.0051 | 144.32 | 3.25 | 2007/04/08 |
| C/2007 H4 | SOHO-1281 | – | 1.0 | – | 0.0052 | 139.51 | 8.21 | 2007/04/19 |
| C/2007 H5 | SOHO-1282 | – | 1.0 | – | 0.0051 | 143.78 | 1.05 | 2007/04/21 |
| C/2007 H6 | SOHO-1283 | – | 1.0 | – | 0.0052 | 144.28 | 8.55 | 2007/04/22 |
| C/2007 H7 | SOHO-1284 | – | 1.0 | – | 0.0051 | 144.54 | 1.83 | 2007/04/23 |
| – | SOHO-4785 | – | 1.0 | – | – | – | – | 2007/04/26 |
| C/2007 H8 | SOHO-1285 | – | 1.0 | – | 0.0051 | 144.38 | 357.26 | 2007/04/30 |
| C/2007 H9 | SOHO-1286 | – | 1.0 | – | 0.005 | 143.75 | 0.72 | 2007/04/30 |
| C/2007 J2 | SOHO-1288 | – | 1.0 | – | 0.0052 | 144.06 | 0.42 | 2007/05/03 |
| C/2007 J3 | SOHO-1289 | – | 1.0 | – | 0.0052 | 144.37 | 6.02 | 2007/05/05 |
| C/2007 J4 | SOHO-1290 | – | 1.0 | – | 0.0051 | 143.87 | 0.66 | 2007/05/05 |
| C/2007 J5 | SOHO-1291 | – | 1.0 | – | 0.0051 | 143.82 | 358.87 | 2007/05/07 |
| C/2007 J6 | SOHO-1292 | – | 1.0 | – | 0.0066 | 145.18 | 2.22 | 2007/05/09 |
| C/2007 J8 | SOHO-1298 | – | 1.0 | – | 0.0052 | 138.32 | 20.64 | 2007/05/13 |
| C/2007 J9 | SOHO-1299 | – | 1.0 | – | 0.006 | 142.32 | 8.79 | 2007/05/14 |
| C/2007 J10 | SOHO-1300 | – | 1.0 | – | 0.0052 | 144.67 | 4.42 | 2007/05/14 |
| C/2007 J11 | SOHO-1301 | – | 1.0 | – | 0.0049 | 144.38 | 9.48 | 2007/05/16 |
| C/2007 J12 | SOHO-1302 | – | 1.0 | – | 0.0079 | 142.26 | 18.31 | 2007/05/16 |
| C/2007 K7 | SOHO-1303 | – | 1.0 | – | 0.0081 | 140.36 | 6.91 | 2007/05/17 |
| C/2007 K8 | SOHO-1304 | – | 1.0 | – | 0.0051 | 143.86 | 1.23 | 2007/05/18 |
| C/2007 K9 | SOHO-1305 | – | 1.0 | – | 0.0048 | 143.58 | 357.17 | 2007/05/18 |
| C/2007 K10 | SOHO-1306 | – | 1.0 | – | 0.0055 | 143.61 | 9.17 | 2007/05/18 |
| C/2007 K11 | SOHO-1307 | – | 1.0 | – | 0.0051 | 142.27 | 6.82 | 2007/05/18 |
| C/2007 K13 | SOHO-1309 | – | 1.0 | – | 0.0049 | 143.98 | 10.78 | 2007/05/21 |
| C/2007 K14 | SOHO-1310 | – | 1.0 | – | 0.0051 | 143.91 | 10.93 | 2007/05/21 |
| C/2007 K15 | SOHO-1311 | – | 1.0 | – | 0.0084 | 141.95 | 14.31 | 2007/05/22 |
| C/2007 K16 | SOHO-1312 | – | 1.0 | – | 0.0059 | 143.81 | 6.64 | 2007/05/22 |
| C/2007 K17 | SOHO-1313 | – | 1.0 | – | 0.005 | 144.05 | 5.69 | 2007/05/25 |
| C/2007 K18 | SOHO-1314 | – | 1.0 | – | 0.0052 | 143.17 | 9.71 | 2007/05/26 |
| C/2007 K19 | SOHO-1315 | – | 1.0 | – | 0.0085 | 125.18 | 12.41 | 2007/05/28 |
| C/2007 K20 | SOHO-1316 | – | 1.0 | – | 0.0049 | 141.43 | 307.96 | 2007/05/31 |
| C/2007 K21 | SOHO-1338 | – | 1.0 | – | 0.0073 | 139.84 | 16.27 | 2007/05/23 |
| C/2007 L1 | SOHO-1317 | – | 1.0 | – | 0.0049 | 140.33 | 15.52 | 2007/06/04 |
| C/2007 L2 | SOHO-1318 | – | 1.0 | – | 0.00502 | 144.627 | 4.137 | 2007/06/06 |
| C/2007 L3 | SOHO-1319 | – | 1.0 | – | 0.00712 | 144.542 | 4.824 | 2007/06/08 |
| C/2007 L4 | SOHO-1320 | – | 1.0 | – | 0.0048 | 141.03 | 12.48 | 2007/06/08 |
| C/2007 L5 | SOHO-1321 | – | 1.0 | – | 0.0078 | 146.66 | 340.06 | 2007/06/09 |
| C/2007 L6 | SOHO-1322 | – | 1.0 | – | 0.0072 | 143.02 | 10.65 | 2007/06/11 |
| C/2007 L7 | SOHO-1323 | – | 1.0 | – | 0.0057 | 144.79 | 1.29 | 2007/06/11 |
| C/2007 L8 | SOHO-1324 | – | 1.0 | – | 0.0071 | 143.53 | 8.56 | 2007/06/11 |
| C/2007 L9 | SOHO-1325 | – | 1.0 | – | 0.0072 | 143.46 | 8.62 | 2007/06/11 |
| C/2007 L10 | SOHO-1326 | – | 1.0 | – | 0.005 | 143.63 | 1.26 | 2007/06/14 |
| C/2007 L11 | SOHO-1327 | – | 1.0 | – | 0.0048 | 145.3 | 4.55 | 2007/06/15 |
| C/2007 L12 | SOHO-1328 | – | 1.0 | – | 0.0051 | 125.73 | 33.95 | 2007/06/15 |
| C/2007 L13 | SOHO-1329 | – | 1.0 | – | 0.00712 | 144.668 | 4.336 | 2007/06/16 |
| C/2007 M4 | SOHO-1330 | – | 1.0 | – | 0.0072 | 144.6 | 4.52 | 2007/06/26 |
| C/2007 M5 | SOHO | – | 1.0 | – | 0.0011 | 154.15 | 14.62 | 2007/06/25 |
| C/2007 M6 | SOHO-1332 | – | 1.0 | – | 0.0058 | 124.45 | 42.43 | 2007/06/25 |
| C/2007 M7 | SOHO-1333 | – | 1.0 | – | 0.0054 | 144.63 | 342.27 | 2007/06/25 |
| C/2007 M9 | SOHO-1335 | – | 1.0 | – | 0.0049 | 145.79 | 353.21 | 2007/06/28 |
| C/2007 M10 | SOHO-1336 | – | 1.0 | – | 0.0049 | 145.31 | 3.72 | 2007/06/30 |
| C/2007 N4 | SOHO-1339 | – | 1.0 | – | 0.0048 | 144.26 | 354.5 | 2007/07/04 |
| C/2007 N5 | SOHO-1340 | – | 1.0 | – | 0.005 | 143.64 | 2.68 | 2007/07/08 |
| C/2007 N6 | SOHO-1341 | – | 1.0 | – | 0.0053 | 144.43 | 357.31 | 2007/07/12 |
| C/2007 N7 | SOHO-1342 | – | 1.0 | – | 0.0048 | 144.6 | 8.43 | 2007/07/14 |
| C/2007 N8 | SOHO-1343 | – | 1.0 | – | 0.0049 | 143.16 | 5.45 | 2007/07/14 |
| C/2007 O3 | SOHO-1344 | – | 1.0 | – | 0.0051 | 139.85 | 24.28 | 2007/07/19 |
| C/2007 O4 | SOHO-1345 | – | 1.0 | – | 0.0048 | 144.04 | 357.02 | 2007/07/28 |
| C/2007 Q4 | SOHO-1346 | – | 1.0 | – | 0.0049 | 144.69 | 3.15 | 2007/08/18 |
| C/2007 Q5 | SOHO-1347 | – | 1.0 | – | 0.0059 | 143.42 | 10.25 | 2007/08/18 |
| C/2007 Q6 | SOHO-1348 | – | 1.0 | – | 0.0049 | 144.34 | 358.48 | 2007/08/18 |
| – | SOHO-5069 | – | 1.0 | – | – | – | – | 2007/08/25 |
| C/2007 Q7 | SOHO-1349 | – | 1.0 | – | 0.0052 | 144.5 | 5.39 | 2007/08/26 |
| C/2007 Q8 | SOHO-1350 | – | 1.0 | – | 0.005 | 143.93 | 0.8 | 2007/08/29 |
| C/2007 Q9 | SOHO-1351 | – | 1.0 | – | 0.0051 | 144.4 | 359.06 | 2007/08/29 |
| C/2007 R6 | SOHO-1352 | – | 1.0 | – | 0.0071 | 139.74 | 345.79 | 2007/09/01 |
| – | SOHO-4786 | – | 1.0 | – | – | – | – | 2007/09/06 |
| – | SOHO-4787 | – | 1.0 | – | – | – | – | 2007/09/07 |
| C/2007 R7 | SOHO-1353 | – | 1.0 | – | 0.0074 | 132.44 | 324.07 | 2007/09/08 |
| C/2007 R8 | SOHO-1354 | – | 1.0 | – | 0.0087 | 145.01 | 2.76 | 2007/09/10 |
| C/2007 R9 | SOHO-1355 | – | 1.0 | – | 0.0051 | 143.54 | 0.47 | 2007/09/14 |
| C/2007 S3 | SOHO-1357 | – | 1.0 | – | 0.0051 | 143.99 | 357.06 | 2007/09/16 |
| C/2007 S4 | SOHO-1358 | – | 1.0 | – | 0.005 | 138.08 | 325.85 | 2007/09/24 |
| C/2007 S5 | SOHO-1359 | – | 1.0 | – | 0.00492 | 144.691 | 7.746 | 2007/09/28 |
| C/2007 S6 | SOHO-1360 | – | 1.0 | – | 0.0048 | 144.82 | 4.32 | 2007/09/28 |
| C/2007 S7 | SOHO-1363 | – | 1.0 | – | 0.005 | 143.36 | 354.14 | 2007/09/29 |
| C/2007 S8 | SOHO-1361 | – | 1.0 | – | 0.0051 | 144.78 | 3.61 | 2007/09/29 |
| C/2007 S9 | SOHO-1364 | – | 1.0 | – | 0.0052 | 144.1 | 358.39 | 2007/09/30 |
| C/2007 S10 | SOHO-1365 | – | 1.0 | – | 0.0049 | 144.08 | 358.88 | 2007/09/30 |
| C/2007 T7 | SOHO-1366 | – | 1.0 | – | 0.0048 | 144.14 | 358.34 | 2007/10/05 |
| C/2007 T8 | SOHO-1368 | – | 1.0 | – | 0.0049 | 144.44 | 359.12 | 2007/10/11 |
| C/2007 T9 | SOHO-1367 | – | 1.0 | – | 0.0049 | 144.17 | 358.46 | 2007/10/11 |
| C/2007 T10 | SOHO-1369 | – | 1.0 | – | 0.0049 | 144.09 | 358.34 | 2007/10/11 |
| C/2007 T11 | SOHO-1370 | – | 1.0 | – | 0.005 | 144.21 | 359.32 | 2007/10/13 |
| – | SOHO-4788 | – | 1.0 | – | – | – | – | 2007/10/13 |
| C/2007 T12 | SOHO-1371 | – | 1.0 | – | 0.005 | 145.9 | 352.14 | 2007/10/13 |
| C/2007 T13 | SOHO-1372 | – | 1.0 | – | 0.0049 | 144.34 | 9.46 | 2007/10/15 |
| C/2007 T14 | SOHO-1373 | – | 1.0 | – | 0.0049 | 140.92 | 302.47 | 2007/10/15 |
| C/2007 U3 | SOHO-1374 | – | 1.0 | – | 0.0052 | 145.8 | 358.97 | 2007/10/24 |
| C/2007 U4 | SOHO-1375 | – | 1.0 | – | 0.0051 | 145.35 | 1.8 | 2007/10/24 |
| C/2007 U5 | SOHO-1376 | – | 1.0 | – | 0.005 | 146.63 | 356.78 | 2007/10/24 |
| C/2007 U6 | SOHO-1377 | – | 1.0 | – | 0.005 | 144.93 | 1.28 | 2007/10/25 |
| C/2007 U8 | SOHO-1378 | – | 1.0 | – | 0.0049 | 144.89 | 3.14 | 2007/10/28 |
| C/2007 U9 | SOHO-1380 | – | 1.0 | – | 0.005 | 146.59 | 356.28 | 2007/10/28 |
| C/2007 U10 | SOHO-1381 | – | 1.0 | – | 0.005 | 144.07 | 358.78 | 2007/10/29 |
| C/2007 U11 | SOHO-1382 | – | 1.0 | – | 0.0052 | 145.74 | 354.13 | 2007/10/29 |
| C/2007 U12 | SOHO-1383 | – | 1.0 | – | 0.0052 | 143.48 | 5.11 | 2007/10/31 |
| C/2007 U13 | SOHO-1384 | – | 1.0 | – | 0.005 | 143.66 | 0.95 | 2007/10/31 |
| C/2007 V3 | SOHO-1385 | – | 1.0 | – | 0.0051 | 145.17 | 4.56 | 2007/11/01 |
| C/2007 V4 | SOHO-1386 | – | 1.0 | – | 0.00458 | 144.063 | 357.856 | 2007/11/03 |
| C/2007 V5 | SOHO-1387 | – | 1.0 | – | 0.005 | 143.82 | 359.55 | 2007/11/03 |
| C/2007 V6 | SOHO-1388 | – | 1.0 | – | 0.0051 | 147.63 | 352.82 | 2007/11/05 |
| C/2007 V7 | SOHO-1389 | – | 1.0 | – | 0.0051 | 143.77 | 1.81 | 2007/11/06 |
| C/2007 V8 | SOHO-1391 | – | 1.0 | – | 0.0049 | 147.61 | 348.03 | 2007/11/06 |
| C/2007 V9 | SOHO-1390 | – | 1.0 | – | 0.0051 | 144.36 | 9.61 | 2007/11/07 |
| C/2007 V11 | SOHO-1393 | – | 1.0 | – | 0.0048 | 144.1 | 6.22 | 2007/11/12 |
| C/2007 V12 | SOHO-1394 | – | 1.0 | – | 0.0076 | 140.62 | 18.14 | 2007/11/11 |
| C/2007 V13 | SOHO-1395 | – | 1.0 | – | 0.0057 | 143.86 | 1.12 | 2007/11/13 |
| C/2007 V14 | SOHO-1396 | – | 1.0 | – | 0.0057 | 141.15 | 11.32 | 2007/11/15 |
| C/2007 W4 | SOHO-1397 | – | 1.0 | – | 0.0074 | 140.84 | 21.88 | 2007/11/20 |
| C/2007 W5 | SOHO-1398 | – | 1.0 | – | 0.0052 | 147.89 | 9.97 | 2007/11/19 |
| C/2007 W6 | SOHO-1399 | – | 1.0 | – | 0.0049 | 142.69 | 8.13 | 2007/11/23 |
| C/2007 W7 | SOHO-1400 | – | 1.0 | – | 0.0048 | 143.5 | 2.24 | 2007/11/24 |
| C/2007 W8 | SOHO-1401 | – | 1.0 | – | 0.008 | 134.92 | 28.29 | 2007/11/24 |
| C/2007 W9 | SOHO-1403 | – | 1.0 | – | 0.0078 | 138.46 | 339.67 | 2007/11/23 |
| C/2007 W10 | SOHO-1402 | – | 1.0 | – | 0.0062 | 141.44 | 12.23 | 2007/11/24 |
| C/2007 W11 | SOHO-1404 | – | 1.0 | – | 0.0068 | 146.86 | 351.32 | 2007/11/29 |
| C/2007 W12 | SOHO-1405 | – | 1.0 | – | 0.0071 | 145.02 | 2.55 | 2007/12/01 |
| C/2007 X2 | SOHO-1407 | – | 1.0 | – | 0.0077 | 146.74 | 334.17 | 2007/12/05 |
| C/2007 X3 | SOHO-1408 | – | 1.0 | – | 0.0064 | 142.81 | 315.29 | 2007/12/05 |
| C/2007 X4 | SOHO-1409 | – | 1.0 | – | 0.0051 | 144.47 | 5.63 | 2007/12/06 |
| C/2007 X5 | SOHO-1410 | – | 1.0 | – | 0.005 | 143.37 | 4.1 | 2007/12/08 |
| C/2007 X6 | SOHO-1411 | – | 1.0 | – | 0.0052 | 140.08 | 18.68 | 2007/12/10 |
| C/2007 X8 | SOHO-1413 | – | 1.0 | – | 0.0053 | 142.94 | 11.64 | 2007/12/11 |
| C/2007 X9 | SOHO-1415 | – | 1.0 | – | 0.0053 | 136.35 | 31.85 | 2007/12/12 |
| C/2007 X10 | SOHO-1414 | – | 1.0 | – | 0.0046 | 144.15 | 356.33 | 2007/12/14 |
| C/2007 X11 | SOHO-1416 | – | 1.0 | – | 0.0051 | 143.29 | 2.32 | 2007/12/12 |
| C/2007 X12 | SOHO-1417 | – | 1.0 | – | 0.0052 | 132.77 | 32.67 | 2007/12/14 |
| C/2007 X13 | SOHO-1418 | – | 1.0 | – | 0.0076 | 138.31 | 305.98 | 2007/12/14 |
| C/2007 X15 | SOHO-1420 | – | 1.0 | – | 0.0087 | 142.34 | 333.02 | 2007/12/15 |
| C/2007 Y3 | SOHO-1421 | – | 1.0 | – | 0.0049 | 144.63 | 350.64 | 2007/12/21 |
| C/2007 Y5 | SOHO-1423 | – | 1.0 | – | 0.0099 | 144.01 | 352.51 | 2007/12/24 |
| C/2007 Y6 | SOHO-1424 | – | 1.0 | – | 0.0098 | 141.24 | 313.8 | 2007/12/26 |
| C/2007 Y7 | SOHO-1425 | – | 1.0 | – | 0.0049 | 146.64 | 359.96 | 2007/12/27 |
| C/2007 Y9 | SOHO-1427 | – | 1.0 | – | 0.005 | 140.64 | 18.61 | 2007/12/29 |
| C/2007 Y10 | SOHO-1428 | – | 1.0 | – | 0.00506 | 144.288 | 6.486 | 2007/12/30 |

=== 2008 ===
Since May 2008, the Small-Body Database of the Jet Propulsion Laboratory no longer list any Kreutz comets discovered through SOHO to its catalog, although the Minor Planet Center continued to assign official designations to them. The last SOHO Kreutz comet listed on JPL-SBDB was C/2008 J16 (SOHO).

| Comet designation | Name/ discoverer(s) | Period (years) | e | a (AU) | q (AU) | i (°) | Node (°) | Perihelion date |
|---|---|---|---|---|---|---|---|---|
| C/2008 B1 | SOHO-1430 | – | 1.0 | – | 0.0071 | 136.24 | 330.27 | 2008/01/26 |
| C/2008 B2 | SOHO-1431 | – | 1.0 | – | 0.00472 | 144.076 | 358.278 | 2008/01/28 |
| C/2008 B3 | SOHO-1432 | – | 1.0 | – | 0.005 | 144.1 | 13.21 | 2008/01/29 |
| C/2008 B4 | SOHO-1433 | – | 1.0 | – | 0.0069 | 145.3 | 354.15 | 2008/01/30 |
| C/2008 C4 | SOHO-1435 | – | 1.0 | – | 0.00959 | 138.695 | 335.566 | 2008/02/04 |
| C/2008 C5 | SOHO-1436 | – | 1.0 | – | 0.00479 | 144.763 | 3.373 | 2008/02/06 |
| C/2008 C6 | SOHO-1437 | – | 1.0 | – | 0.00665 | 145.163 | 3.319 | 2008/02/08 |
| C/2008 C7 | SOHO-1438 | – | 1.0 | – | 0.00425 | 134.41 | 0.847 | 2008/02/09 |
| C/2008 C8 | SOHO-1439 | – | 1.0 | – | 0.0083 | 138.74 | 334.8 | 2008/02/16 |
| C/2008 D1 | STEREO-1 | – | 1.0 | – | 0.0052 | 140.28 | 15.82 | 2008/02/17 |
| C/2008 D2 | STEREO-2 | – | 1.0 | – | 0.0051 | 143.49 | 11.17 | 2008/02/20 |
| C/2008 D3 | STEREO-3 | – | 1.0 | – | 0.00528 | 143.994 | 358.785 | 2008/02/22 |
| C/2008 D4 | STEREO-4 | – | 1.0 | – | 0.0049 | 145.98 | 15.67 | 2008/02/21 |
| C/2008 D5 | SOHO-1441 | – | 1.0 | – | 0.0049 | 142.25 | 345.67 | 2008/02/19 |
| C/2008 D7 | SOHO-1443 | – | 1.0 | – | 0.00592 | 144.181 | 6.401 | 2008/02/26 |
| C/2008 D8 | SOHO-1444 | – | 1.0 | – | 0.0054 | 144.27 | 6.2 | 2008/02/25 |
| C/2008 D9 | SOHO-1445 | – | 1.0 | – | 0.00437 | 143.754 | 359.835 | 2008/03/01 |
| C/2008 E5 | STEREO-5 | – | 1.0 | – | 0.0051 | 144.84 | 7.48 | 2008/03/06 |
| C/2008 E6 | STEREO-6 | – | 1.0 | – | 0.0051 | 143.75 | 356.83 | 2008/03/16 |
| C/2008 E8 | SOHO-1448 | – | 1.0 | – | 0.00648 | 143.997 | 357.475 | 2008/03/07 |
| C/2008 E9 | SOHO-1449 | – | 1.0 | – | 0.00629 | 143.941 | 359.101 | 2008/03/12 |
| C/2008 G3 | SOHO-1451 | – | 1.0 | – | 0.005 | 144.49 | 355.34 | 2008/04/02 |
| C/2008 G4 | SOHO-1452 | – | 1.0 | – | 0.0049 | 143.66 | 359.06 | 2008/04/09 |
| C/2008 G5 | SOHO-1453 | – | 1.0 | – | 0.0048 | 143.6 | 358.49 | 2008/04/10 |
| C/2008 H2 | SOHO-1455 | – | 1.0 | – | 0.0054 | 145.29 | 0.99 | 2008/04/17 |
| C/2008 H3 | SOHO-1456 | – | 1.0 | – | 0.0044 | 144.76 | 2.69 | 2008/04/17 |
| C/2008 H5 | SOHO-1458 | – | 1.0 | – | 0.0048 | 144.96 | 3.01 | 2008/04/26 |
| C/2008 H6 | SOHO-1459 | – | 1.0 | – | 0.0086 | 142.03 | 9.59 | 2008/04/27 |
| C/2008 H7 | SOHO-1460 | – | 1.0 | – | 0.0082 | 142.6 | 10.46 | 2008/04/30 |
| C/2008 H8 | SOHO-1461 | – | 1.0 | – | 0.0051 | 144.78 | 358.71 | 2008/05/01 |
| C/2008 H9 | SOHO-1465 | – | 1.0 | – | 0.005 | 145.95 | 356.87 | 2008/04/22 |
| C/2008 J7 | SOHO-1462 | – | 1.0 | – | 0.0085 | 145.05 | 347.71 | 2008/05/02 |
| C/2008 J8 | SOHO-1463 | – | 1.0 | – | 0.0072 | 144.52 | 4.75 | 2008/05/05 |
| C/2008 J9 | SOHO-1464 | – | 1.0 | – | 0.0051 | 143.21 | 1.11 | 2008/05/05 |
| C/2008 J11 | SOHO-1467 | – | 1.0 | – | 0.0052 | 144.89 | 6.86 | 2008/05/08 |
| C/2008 J13 | SOHO-1469 | – | 1.0 | – | 0.0089 | 138.55 | 20.06 | 2008/05/12 |
| C/2008 J14 | SOHO-1470 | – | 1.0 | – | 0.0045 | 144.1 | 356.81 | 2008/05/14 |
| C/2008 J15 | SOHO-1471 | – | 1.0 | – | 0.0048 | 144.85 | 3.15 | 2008/05/13 |
| C/2008 J16 | SOHO-1472 | – | 1.0 | – | 0.0049 | 145.09 | 352.07 | 2008/05/14 |
| C/2008 K1 | SOHO-1473 | – | 1.0 | – | 0.0054 | 143.97 | 2.03 | 2008/05/17 |
| C/2008 K2 | SOHO-1474 | – | 1.0 | – | 0.0051 | 144.49 | 0.38 | 2008/05/18 |
| C/2008 K3 | SOHO-1475 | – | 1.0 | – | 0.0079 | 142.96 | 10.61 | 2008/05/18 |
| C/2008 K4 | SOHO-1476 | – | 1.0 | – | 0.0046 | 144.57 | 3.64 | 2008/05/23 |
| C/2008 K5 | SOHO-1477 | – | 1.0 | – | 0.007 | 144.73 | 3.56 | 2008/05/24 |
| C/2008 K6 | SOHO-1478 | – | 1.0 | – | 0.008 | 135.67 | 353.42 | 2008/05/26 |
| C/2008 K8 | SOHO-1480 | – | 1.0 | – | 0.008 | 135.31 | 32.42 | 2008/05/28 |
| C/2008 K9 | SOHO-1481 | – | 1.0 | – | 0.0046 | 143.46 | 0.12 | 2008/05/29 |
| C/2008 K11 | SOHO-1482 | – | 1.0 | – | 0.0083 | 132.47 | 35.4 | 2008/05/31 |
| C/2008 L4 | SOHO-1484 | – | 1.0 | – | 0.0073 | 145.00 | 2.40 | 2008/06/02 |
| C/2008 L5 | SOHO-1485 | – | 1.0 | – | 0.0047 | 144.03 | 358.23 | 2008/06/07 |
| C/2008 L8 | SOHO-1486 | – | 1.0 | – | 0.0063 | 128.85 | 9.40 | 2008/06/10 |
| C/2008 L9 | SOHO-1489 | – | 1.0 | – | 0.0051 | 143.97 | 7.03 | 2008/06/11 |
| C/2008 L10 | SOHO-1490 | – | 1.0 | – | 0.0052 | 145.25 | 1.65 | 2008/06/12 |
| C/2008 L12 | SOHO-1492 | – | 1.0 | – | 0.005 | 142.64 | 15.36 | 2008/06/13 |
| C/2008 L13 | SOHO-1493 | – | 1.0 | – | 0.0047 | 144.01 | 356.62 | 2008/06/13 |
| C/2008 L14 | SOHO-1494 | – | 1.0 | – | 0.0052 | 144.57 | 4.22 | 2008/06/16 |
| C/2008 M1 | SOHO-1496 | – | 1.0 | – | 0.0048 | 144.60 | 350.46 | 2008/06/22 |
| C/2008 M2 | SOHO-1497 | – | 1.0 | – | 0.0053 | 146.11 | 357.80 | 2008/06/22 |
| C/2008 M3 | SOHO-1498 | – | 1.0 | – | 0.0049 | 142.58 | 12.00 | 2008/06/24 |
| C/2008 M4 | SOHO-1499 | – | 1.0 | – | 0.0060 | 144.63 | 338.00 | 2008/06/25 |
| C/2008 M5 | SOHO-1500 | – | 1.0 | – | 0.0042 | 139.96 | 22.08 | 2008/06/26 |
| C/2008 M6 | SOHO-1501 | – | 1.0 | – | 0.0049 | 144.54 | 355.98 | 2008/06/28 |
| C/2008 M7 | SOHO-1502 | – | 1.0 | – | 0.0065 | 144.71 | 336.23 | 2008/06/29 |
| C/2008 N2 | SOHO-1503 | – | 1.0 | – | 0.0047 | 143.978 | 358.127 | 2008/07/04 |
| C/2008 N3 | SOHO-1504 | – | 1.0 | – | 0.0049 | 144.23 | 354.62 | 2008/07/04 |
| C/2008 N5 | SOHO-1506 | – | 1.0 | – | 0.0059 | 144.90 | 352.70 | 2008/07/05 |
| C/2008 N6 | SOHO-1507 | – | 1.0 | – | 0.0076 | 138.61 | 336.71 | 2008/07/06 |
| C/2008 N7 | SOHO-1508 | – | 1.0 | – | 0.0076 | 145.10 | 333.88 | 2008/07/06 |
| C/2008 N9 | SOHO-1510 | – | 1.0 | – | 0.0049 | 142.67 | 8.05 | 2008/07/08 |
| C/2008 N8 | SOHO-1509 | – | 1.0 | – | 0.0052 | 144.42 | 5.12 | 2008/07/09 |
| C/2008 N11 | SOHO-1512 | – | 1.0 | – | 0.0076 | 343.97 | 146.66 | 2008/07/13 |
| C/2008 O5 | SOHO-1513 | – | 1.0 | – | 0.0051 | 144.77 | 6.07 | 2008/07/18 |
| C/2008 O1 | SOHO-1517 | – | 1.0 | – | 0.0048 | 144.05 | 8.02 | 2008/08/01 |
| C/2008 P2 | SOHO-1518 | – | 1.0 | – | 0.0048 | 143.62 | 2.84 | 2008/08/02 |
| C/2008 P3 | SOHO-1519 | – | 1.0 | – | 0.0050 | 144.02 | 357.64 | 2008/08/07 |
| C/2008 P4 | SOHO-1520 | – | 1.0 | – | 0.0073 | 144.03 | 6.58 | 2008/08/08 |
| C/2008 P5 | SOHO-1521 | – | 1.0 | – | 0.0079 | 138.60 | 336.05 | 2008/08/10 |
| C/2008 P6 | SOHO-1522 | – | 1.0 | – | 0.0049 | 144.69 | 7.37 | 2008/08/15 |
| C/2008 Q5 | SOHO-1523 | – | 1.0 | – | 0.0051 | 145.24 | 353.33 | 2008/08/27 |
| C/2008 R9 | SOHO-1525 | – | 1.0 | – | 0.0051 | 144.33 | 3.58 | 2008/09/05 |
| C/2008 R10 | SOHO-1527 | – | 1.0 | – | 0.0045 | 143.89 | 358.69 | 2008/09/09 |
| C/2008 R11 | SOHO-1528 | – | 1.0 | – | 0.0052 | 144.64 | 6.98 | 2008/09/08 |
| – | SOHO-4814 | – | 1.0 | – | – | – | – | 2008/09/11 |
| C/2008 R12 | SOHO-1529 | – | 1.0 | – | 0.0055 | 143.89 | 359.86 | 2008/09/13 |
| C/2008 R13 | SOHO-1530 | – | 1.0 | – | 0.0052 | 143.92 | 6.65 | 2008/09/15 |
| C/2008 S4 | SOHO-1531 | – | 1.0 | – | 0.0052 | 143.77 | 359.06 | 2008/09/18 |
| C/2008 S5 | SOHO-1533 | – | 1.0 | – | 0.0051 | 143.7 | 7.87 | 2008/09/20 |
| C/2008 S6 | SOHO-1534 | – | 1.0 | – | 0.0051 | 139.97 | 326.88 | 2008/09/28 |
| C/2008 S7 | SOHO-1535 | – | 1.0 | – | 0.006 | 144.23 | 359.59 | 2008/09/29 |
| C/2008 S8 | SOHO-1536 | – | 1.0 | – | 0.0049 | 143.91 | 359.1 | 2008/09/30 |
| C/2008 T8 | SOHO-1539 | – | 1.0 | – | 0.0065 | 144.74 | 4.46 | 2008/10/06 |
| C/2008 T9 | SOHO-1540 | – | 1.0 | – | 0.0049 | 144.23 | 357.3 | 2008/10/05 |
| C/2008 T10 | SOHO-1541 | – | 1.0 | – | 0.0079 | 145.13 | 3.34 | 2008/10/12 |
| C/2008 T11 | SOHO-1542 | – | 1.0 | – | 0.0048 | 144.27 | 358.15 | 2008/10/14 |
| C/2008 T12 | SOHO-1543 | – | 1.0 | – | 0.0078 | 144.23 | 5.6 | 2008/10/14 |
| C/2008 U2 | SOHO-1544 | – | 1.0 | – | 0.0051 | 143.77 | 359.41 | 2008/10/16 |
| C/2008 U3 | SOHO-1545 | – | 1.0 | – | 0.005 | 144.19 | 357.94 | 2008/10/17 |
| C/2008 U4 | SOHO-1546 | – | 1.0 | – | 0.0057 | 144.35 | 5.68 | 2008/10/17 |
| C/2008 U5 | SOHO-1547 | – | 1.0 | – | 0.0051 | 146.27 | 335.03 | 2008/10/18 |
| C/2008 U7 | SOHO-1549 | – | 1.0 | – | 0.0066 | 144.84 | 2.9 | 2008/10/21 |
| C/2008 U8 | SOHO-1550 | – | 1.0 | – | 0.005 | 147.15 | 356.22 | 2008/10/21 |
| C/2008 U9 | SOHO-1551 | – | 1.0 | – | 0.005 | 144.82 | 0.67 | 2008/10/21 |
| C/2008 U10 | SOHO-1552 | – | 1.0 | – | – | – | – | 2008/10/24 |
| C/2008 U11 | SOHO-1553 | – | 1.0 | – | – | – | – | 2008/10/24 |
| C/2008 U12 | SOHO-1556 | – | 1.0 | – | – | – | – | 2008/10/26 |
| C/2008 U13 | SOHO-1554 | – | 1.0 | – | – | – | – | 2008/10/27 |
| C/2008 U14 | SOHO-1555 | – | 1.0 | – | – | – | – | 2008/10/27 |
| C/2008 U15 | SOHO-1557 | – | 1.0 | – | – | – | – | 2008/10/28 |
| C/2008 U16 | SOHO-1558 | – | 1.0 | – | – | – | – | 2008/10/30 |
| C/2008 V1 | SOHO-1559 | – | 1.0 | – | – | – | – | 2008/11/02 |
| C/2008 V2 | SOHO-1560 | – | 1.0 | – | – | – | – | 2008/11/04 |
| C/2008 V3 | SOHO-1561 | – | 1.0 | – | – | – | – | 2008/11/06 |
| C/2008 V4 | SOHO-1562 | – | 1.0 | – | – | – | – | 2008/11/07 |
| C/2008 V5 | SOHO-1563 | – | 1.0 | – | – | – | – | 2008/11/08 |
| – | SOHO-4815 | – | 1.0 | – | – | – | – | 2008/11/12 |
| C/2008 V6 | SOHO-1564 | – | 1.0 | – | – | – | – | 2008/11/13 |
| C/2008 W2 | SOHO-1565 | – | 1.0 | – | – | – | – | 2008/11/16 |
| C/2008 W1 | STEREO-7 | – | 1.0 | – | – | – | – | 2008/11/18 |
| C/2008 W3 | SOHO-1566 | – | 1.0 | – | – | – | – | 2008/11/23 |
| C/2008 W5 | SOHO-1567 | – | 1.0 | – | – | – | – | 2008/11/23 |
| C/2008 W4 | SOHO-1569 | – | 1.0 | – | – | – | – | 2008/11/24 |
| C/2008 W6 | SOHO-1568 | – | 1.0 | – | – | – | – | 2008/11/24 |
| C/2008 W7 | SOHO-1570 | – | 1.0 | – | – | – | – | 2008/11/24 |
| C/2008 W8 | SOHO-1571 | – | 1.0 | – | – | – | – | 2008/11/26 |
| C/2008 W9 | SOHO-1572 | – | 1.0 | – | – | – | – | 2008/11/27 |
| C/2008 W10 | SOHO-1573 | – | 1.0 | – | – | – | – | 2008/11/28 |
| C/2008 W11 | SOHO-1574 | – | 1.0 | – | – | – | – | 2008/11/29 |
| C/2008 W12 | SOHO-1575 | – | 1.0 | – | – | – | – | 2008/11/29 |
| C/2008 X7 | SOHO-1576 | – | 1.0 | – | – | – | – | 2008/12/01 |
| C/2008 X8 | SOHO-1577 | – | 1.0 | – | – | – | – | 2008/12/02 |
| C/2008 X9 | SOHO-1578 | – | 1.0 | – | – | – | – | 2008/12/03 |
| C/2008 X10 | SOHO-1579 | – | 1.0 | – | – | – | – | 2008/12/03 |
| C/2008 X11 | SOHO-1580 | – | 1.0 | – | – | – | – | 2008/12/05 |
| C/2008 X12 | SOHO-1583 | – | 1.0 | – | – | – | – | 2008/12/09 |
| C/2008 X13 | SOHO-1584 | – | 1.0 | – | – | – | – | 2008/12/10 |
| C/2008 X14 | SOHO-1585 | – | 1.0 | – | – | – | – | 2008/12/13 |
| C/2008 Y4 | SOHO-1587 | – | 1.0 | – | – | – | – | 2008/12/19 |
| C/2008 Y5 | SOHO-1586 | – | 1.0 | – | – | – | – | 2008/12/19 |
| C/2008 Y6 | SOHO-1588 | – | 1.0 | – | – | – | – | 2008/12/21 |
| C/2008 Y7 | SOHO-1589 | – | 1.0 | – | – | – | – | 2008/12/21 |
| C/2008 Y8 | SOHO-1590 | – | 1.0 | – | – | – | – | 2008/12/21 |
| C/2008 Y9 | SOHO-1591 | – | 1.0 | – | – | – | – | 2008/12/21 |
| C/2008 Y10 | SOHO-1592 | – | 1.0 | – | – | – | – | 2008/12/21 |
| C/2008 Y18 | SOHO-1606 | – | 1.0 | – | – | – | – | 2008/12/25 |
| C/2008 Y13 | SOHO-1595 | – | 1.0 | – | – | – | – | 2008/12/27 |
| C/2008 Y15 | SOHO-1597 | – | 1.0 | – | – | – | – | 2008/12/29 |

=== 2009 ===
| Comet designation | Name/ discoverer(s) | Period (years) | e | a (AU) | q (AU) | i (°) | Node (°) | Perihelion date |
|---|---|---|---|---|---|---|---|---|
| C/2009 A2 | SOHO-1598 | – | 1.0 | – | 0.0076 | – | – | 2009/01/01 |
| C/2009 A3 | SOHO-1599 | – | 1.0 | – | 0.0046 | – | – | 2009/01/02 |
| C/2009 A4 | SOHO-1600 | – | 1.0 | – | 0.0047 | – | – | 2009/01/02 |
| C/2009 A5 | SOHO-1601 | – | 1.0 | – | 0.0075 | – | – | 2009/01/03 |
| C/2009 A7 | SOHO-1602 | – | 1.0 | – | 0.0066 | – | – | 2009/01/05 |
| C/2009 B8 | SOHO-1603 | – | 1.0 | – | 0.0048 | – | – | 2009/01/21 |
| C/2009 B9 | SOHO-1605 | – | 1.0 | – | 0.0067 | – | – | 2009/01/29 |
| C/2009 B11 | SOHO-1607 | – | 1.0 | – | 0.0051 | – | – | 2009/01/31 |
| C/2009 C3 | SOHO-1608 | – | 1.0 | – | 0.0048 | – | – | 2009/02/05 |
| C/2009 C4 | SOHO-1609 | – | 1.0 | – | 0.0064 | – | – | 2009/02/09 |
| C/2009 C5 | SOHO-1610 | – | 1.0 | – | 0.0053 | – | – | 2009/02/11 |
| C/2009 D2 | SOHO-1611 | – | 1.0 | – | 0.0062 | – | – | 2009/02/19 |
| C/2009 D3 | SOHO-1612 | – | 1.0 | – | 0.0050 | – | – | 2009/02/19 |
| C/2009 D4 | SOHO-1613 | – | 1.0 | – | 0.0053 | – | – | 2009/02/23 |
| C/2009 D5 | SOHO-1614 | – | 1.0 | – | 0.0035 | – | – | 2009/02/24 |
| C/2009 D7 | SOHO-1617 | – | 1.0 | – | 0.0054 | – | – | 2009/02/27 |
| C/2009 E2 | SOHO-1618 | – | 1.0 | – | 0.0029 | – | – | 2009/03/01 |
| C/2009 E4 | SOHO-1620 | – | 1.0 | – | 0.0058 | – | – | 2009/03/11 |
| C/2009 E5 | SOHO-1621 | – | 1.0 | – | 0.0050 | – | – | 2009/03/10 |
| C/2009 F8 | SOHO-1622 | – | 1.0 | – | 0.0083 | – | – | 2009/03/17 |
| – | SOHO-4816 | – | 1.0 | – | – | – | – | 2009/03/25 |
| C/2009 F9 | SOHO-1623 | – | 1.0 | – | 0.0075 | – | – | 2009/03/29 |
| C/2009 F10 | SOHO-1624 | – | 1.0 | – | 0.0054 | – | – | 2009/03/30 |
| C/2009 G2 | SOHO-1625 | – | 1.0 | – | 0.0051 | – | – | 2009/04/02 |
| C/2009 G3 | SOHO-1626 | – | 1.0 | – | 0.0053 | – | – | 2009/04/02 |
| C/2009 G4 | SOHO-1627 | – | 1.0 | – | 0.0051 | – | – | 2009/04/04 |
| C/2009 G5 | SOHO-1628 | – | 1.0 | – | 0.0051 | – | – | 2009/04/06 |
| C/2009 G6 | SOHO-1629 | – | 1.0 | – | 0.0051 | – | – | 2009/04/10 |
| C/2009 G7 | SOHO-1630 | – | 1.0 | – | 0.0079 | – | – | 2009/04/14 |
| C/2009 H3 | SOHO-1632 | – | 1.0 | – | 0.0052 | – | – | 2009/04/18 |
| C/2009 H4 | SOHO-1633 | – | 1.0 | – | 0.0075 | – | – | 2009/04/19 |
| – | SOHO-4817 | – | 1.0 | – | – | – | – | 2009/04/21 |
| C/2009 H5 | SOHO-1634 | – | 1.0 | – | 0.0050 | – | – | 2009/04/22 |
| C/2009 H6 | SOHO-1635 | – | 1.0 | – | 0.0048 | – | – | 2009/04/24 |
| C/2009 H7 | SOHO-1636 | – | 1.0 | – | 0.0050 | – | – | 2009/04/24 |
| C/2009 H8 | SOHO-1637 | – | 1.0 | – | 0.0048 | – | – | 2009/04/25 |
| C/2009 J1 | SOHO-1639 | – | 1.0 | – | 0.0051 | – | – | 2009/05/03 |
| C/2009 J2 | SOHO-1640 | – | 1.0 | – | 0.0051 | – | – | 2009/05/03 |
| C/2009 J3 | SOHO-1641 | – | 1.0 | – | 0.0081 | – | – | 2009/05/04 |
| C/2009 J4 | SOHO-1642 | – | 1.0 | – | 0.0066 | – | – | 2009/05/05 |
| C/2009 J5 | SOHO-1643 | – | 1.0 | – | 0.0051 | – | – | 2009/05/06 |
| C/2009 J6 | SOHO-1645 | – | 1.0 | – | 0.0078 | – | – | 2009/05/07 |
| C/2009 J7 | SOHO-1644 | – | 1.0 | – | 0.0051 | – | – | 2009/05/07 |
| C/2009 J8 | SOHO-1646 | – | 1.0 | – | 0.0051 | – | – | 2009/05/09 |
| C/2009 J9 | SOHO-1647 | – | 1.0 | – | 0.0049 | – | – | 2009/05/09 |
| C/2009 J10 | SOHO-1649 | – | 1.0 | – | 0.0054 | – | – | 2009/05/11 |
| C/2009 J11 | SOHO-1648 | – | 1.0 | – | 0.0061 | – | – | 2009/05/13 |
| C/2009 K6 | SOHO-1651 | – | 1.0 | – | 0.0069 | – | – | 2009/05/17 |
| C/2009 K7 | SOHO-1652 | – | 1.0 | – | 0.0079 | – | – | 2009/05/20 |
| C/2009 K8 | SOHO-1653 | – | 1.0 | – | 0.0050 | – | – | 2009/05/24 |
| C/2009 K9 | SOHO-1654 | – | 1.0 | – | 0.0051 | – | – | 2009/05/27 |
| C/2009 K10 | SOHO-1655 | – | 1.0 | – | 0.0050 | – | – | 2009/05/28 |
| C/2009 K11 | SOHO-1656 | – | 1.0 | – | 0.0071 | – | – | 2009/05/29 |
| C/2009 K12 | SOHO-1657 | – | 1.0 | – | 0.0051 | – | – | 2009/05/30 |
| C/2009 K13 | SOHO-1658 | – | 1.0 | – | 0.0050 | – | – | 2009/05/31 |
| C/2009 K14 | SOHO-1659 | – | 1.0 | – | 0.0087 | – | – | 2009/06/01 |
| C/2009 L3 | SOHO-1660 | – | 1.0 | – | 0.0047 | – | – | 2009/06/04 |
| C/2009 L4 | SOHO-1661 | – | 1.0 | – | 0.0055 | – | – | 2009/06/05 |
| C/2009 L5 | SOHO-1662 | – | 1.0 | – | 0.0047 | – | – | 2009/06/05 |
| C/2009 L6 | SOHO-1663 | – | 1.0 | – | 0.0055 | – | – | 2009/06/07 |
| C/2009 L7 | SOHO-1670 | – | 1.0 | – | 0.0066 | – | – | 2009/06/01 |
| C/2009 L9 | SOHO-1665 | – | 1.0 | – | 0.0075 | – | – | 2009/06/07 |
| C/2009 L10 | SOHO-1666 | – | 1.0 | – | 0.0055 | – | – | 2009/06/07 |
| C/2009 L11 | SOHO-1667 | – | 1.0 | – | 0.0050 | – | – | 2009/06/08 |
| C/2009 L12 | SOHO-1671 | – | 1.0 | – | 0.0079 | – | – | 2009/06/09 |
| C/2009 L14 | SOHO-1669 | – | 1.0 | – | 0.0049 | – | – | 2009/06/10 |
| C/2009 L15 | SOHO-1672 | – | 1.0 | – | 0.0053 | – | – | 2009/06/11 |
| C/2009 L16 | SOHO-1673 | – | 1.0 | – | 0.0054 | – | – | 2009/06/14 |
| C/2009 L17 | SOHO-1674 | – | 1.0 | – | 0.0083 | – | – | 2009/06/15 |
| C/2009 M1 | SOHO-1675 | – | 1.0 | – | 0.0050 | – | – | 2009/06/22 |
| C/2009 M2 | SOHO-1676 | – | 1.0 | – | 0.0049 | – | – | 2009/06/23 |
| C/2009 M3 | SOHO-1677 | – | 1.0 | – | 0.0051 | – | – | 2009/06/23 |
| C/2009 M4 | SOHO-1678 | – | 1.0 | – | 0.0052 | – | – | 2009/06/25 |
| C/2009 M5 | SOHO-1679 | – | 1.0 | – | 0.0053 | – | – | 2009/06/25 |
| C/2009 M6 | SOHO-1680 | – | 1.0 | – | 0.0053 | – | – | 2009/06/26 |
| C/2009 M7 | SOHO-1681 | – | 1.0 | – | 0.0052 | – | – | 2009/06/27 |
| C/2009 N2 | SOHO-1684 | – | 1.0 | – | 0.0066 | – | – | 2009/07/04 |
| C/2009 O5 | SOHO-1686 | – | 1.0 | – | 0.0054 | – | – | 2009/07/29 |
| C/2009 P3 | SOHO-1687 | – | 1.0 | – | 0.0054 | – | – | 2009/08/02 |
| C/2009 P4 | SOHO-1688 | – | 1.0 | – | 0.0049 | – | – | 2009/08/10 |
| C/2009 P5 | SOHO-1689 | – | 1.0 | – | 0.0051 | – | – | 2009/08/12 |
| C/2009 Q6 | SOHO-1690 | – | 1.0 | – | 0.0054 | – | – | 2009/08/21 |
| C/2009 Q7 | SOHO-1691 | – | 1.0 | – | 0.0051 | – | – | 2009/08/23 |
| C/2009 Q8 | SOHO-1692 | – | 1.0 | – | 0.0051 | – | – | 2009/08/31 |
| C/2009 R3 | SOHO-1693 | – | 1.0 | – | 0.0049 | – | – | 2009/09/08 |
| C/2009 R4 | SOHO-1694 | – | 1.0 | – | 0.0048 | – | – | 2009/09/11 |
| C/2009 R5 | SOHO-1695 | – | 1.0 | – | 0.0050 | – | – | 2009/09/13 |
| C/2009 S5 | SOHO-1696 | – | 1.0 | – | 0.0048 | – | – | 2009/09/18 |
| C/2009 S6 | SOHO-1697 | – | 1.0 | – | 0.0051 | – | – | 2009/09/24 |
| C/2009 S7 | SOHO-1698 | – | 1.0 | – | 0.0058 | – | – | 2009/09/26 |
| C/2009 S8 | SOHO-1699 | – | 1.0 | – | 0.0049 | – | – | 2009/09/27 |
| C/2009 S10 | SOHO-1701 | – | 1.0 | – | 0.0051 | – | – | 2009/09/28 |
| C/2009 S11 | SOHO-1702 | – | 1.0 | – | 0.0054 | – | – | 2009/09/30 |
| C/2009 S12 | SOHO-1703 | – | 1.0 | – | 0.0082 | – | – | 2009/09/30 |
| C/2009 T4 | SOHO-1704 | – | 1.0 | – | 0.0082 | – | – | 2009/10/04 |
| C/2009 T5 | SOHO-1705 | – | 1.0 | – | 0.0094 | – | – | 2009/10/06 |
| C/2009 T6 | SOHO-1706 | – | 1.0 | – | 0.0050 | – | – | 2009/10/08 |
| C/2009 T7 | SOHO-1707 | – | 1.0 | – | 0.0050 | – | – | 2009/10/08 |
| C/2009 T8 | SOHO-1708 | – | 1.0 | – | 0.0067 | – | – | 2009/10/12 |
| C/2009 T9 | SOHO-1709 | – | 1.0 | – | 0.0052 | – | – | 2009/10/13 |
| C/2009 T11 | SOHO-1710 | – | 1.0 | – | 0.0051 | – | – | 2009/10/14 |
| C/2009 T12 | SOHO-1711 | – | 1.0 | – | 0.0048 | – | – | 2009/10/14 |
| C/2009 T13 | SOHO-1713 | – | 1.0 | – | 0.0049 | – | – | 2009/10/15 |
| C/2009 U8 | SOHO-1715 | – | 1.0 | – | 0.0048 | – | – | 2009/10/18 |
| C/2009 U9 | SOHO-1716 | – | 1.0 | – | 0.0025 | – | – | 2009/10/22 |
| C/2009 U11 | SOHO-1718 | – | 1.0 | – | 0.0051 | – | – | 2009/10/23 |
| C/2009 U12 | SOHO-1719 | – | 1.0 | – | 0.0051 | – | – | 2009/10/26 |
| C/2009 U13 | SOHO-1720 | – | 1.0 | – | 0.0082 | – | – | 2009/10/29 |
| C/2009 U14 | SOHO-1721 | – | 1.0 | – | 0.0056 | – | – | 2009/10/31 |
| C/2009 V1 | SOHO-1748 | – | 1.0 | – | 0.0052 | – | – | 2009/11/05 |
| C/2009 V2 | SOHO-1780 | – | 1.0 | – | 0.0046 | – | – | 2009/11/06 |
| C/2009 V3 | SOHO-1722 | – | 1.0 | – | 0.0068 | – | – | 2009/11/03 |
| C/2009 V4 | SOHO-1723 | – | 1.0 | – | 0.0071 | – | – | 2009/11/03 |
| C/2009 V5 | SOHO-1731 | – | 1.0 | – | 0.0053 | – | – | 2009/11/07 |
| C/2009 V6 | SOHO-1732 | – | 1.0 | – | 0.0065 | – | – | 2009/11/14 |
| C/2009 V7 | SOHO-1733 | – | 1.0 | – | 0.0054 | – | – | 2009/11/16 |
| C/2009 W3 | SOHO-1734 | – | 1.0 | – | 0.0075 | – | – | 2009/11/17 |
| C/2009 W4 | SOHO-1735 | – | 1.0 | – | 0.0061 | – | – | 2009/11/18 |
| C/2009 W5 | SOHO-1736 | – | 1.0 | – | 0.0048 | – | – | 2009/11/17 |
| C/2009 W6 | SOHO-1737 | – | 1.0 | – | 0.0050 | – | – | 2009/11/19 |
| C/2009 W7 | SOHO-1738 | – | 1.0 | – | 0.0049 | – | – | 2009/11/23 |
| C/2009 W9 | SOHO-1740 | – | 1.0 | – | 0.0050 | – | – | 2009/11/25 |
| C/2009 W10 | SOHO-1741 | – | 1.0 | – | 0.0066 | – | – | 2009/11/26 |
| C/2009 W11 | SOHO-1742 | – | 1.0 | – | 0.0049 | – | – | 2009/11/27 |
| C/2009 W12 | SOHO-1743 | – | 1.0 | – | 0.0051 | – | – | 2009/11/28 |
| C/2009 W13 | SOHO-1745 | – | 1.0 | – | 0.0080 | – | – | 2009/11/28 |
| C/2009 W14 | SOHO-1744 | – | 1.0 | – | 0.0081 | – | – | 2009/11/28 |
| C/2009 W15 | SOHO-1746 | – | 1.0 | – | 0.0049 | – | – | 2009/11/29 |
| C/2009 W16 | SOHO-1747 | – | 1.0 | – | 0.0048 | – | – | 2009/11/30 |
| C/2009 X2 | SOHO-1749 | – | 1.0 | – | 0.0051 | – | – | 2009/12/02 |
| C/2009 X3 | SOHO-1750 | – | 1.0 | – | 0.0049 | – | – | 2009/12/02 |
| C/2009 X4 | SOHO-1751 | – | 1.0 | – | 0.0051 | – | – | 2009/12/03 |
| C/2009 X5 | SOHO-1752 | – | 1.0 | – | 0.0082 | – | – | 2009/12/04 |
| C/2009 X6 | SOHO-1753 | – | 1.0 | – | 0.0086 | – | – | 2009/12/05 |
| C/2009 X7 | SOHO-1754 | – | 1.0 | – | 0.0051 | – | – | 2009/12/05 |
| C/2009 X8 | SOHO-1755 | – | 1.0 | – | 0.0057 | – | – | 2009/12/06 |
| C/2009 X9 | SOHO-1756 | – | 1.0 | – | 0.0054 | – | – | 2009/12/08 |
| C/2009 X10 | SOHO-1757 | – | 1.0 | – | 0.0056 | – | – | 2009/12/07 |
| C/2009 X11 | SOHO-1758 | – | 1.0 | – | 0.0047 | – | – | 2009/12/07 |
| C/2009 X12 | SOHO-1759 | – | 1.0 | – | 0.0052 | – | – | 2009/12/10 |
| C/2009 X13 | SOHO-1760 | – | 1.0 | – | 0.0055 | – | – | 2009/12/10 |
| C/2009 X14 | SOHO-1761 | – | 1.0 | – | 0.0048 | – | – | 2009/12/11 |
| C/2009 X15 | SOHO-1762 | – | 1.0 | – | 0.0051 | – | – | 2009/12/14 |
| C/2009 X16 | SOHO-1763 | – | 1.0 | – | 0.0051 | – | – | 2009/12/14 |
| C/2009 X17 | SOHO-1764 | – | 1.0 | – | 0.0047 | – | – | 2009/12/17 |
| C/2009 Y5 | SOHO-1767 | – | 1.0 | – | 0.0069 | – | – | 2009/12/17 |
| C/2009 Y6 | SOHO-1765 | – | 1.0 | – | 0.0049 | – | – | 2009/12/17 |
| C/2009 Y7 | SOHO-1766 | – | 1.0 | – | 0.0053 | – | – | 2009/12/18 |
| C/2009 Y9 | SOHO-1769 | – | 1.0 | – | 0.0084 | – | – | 2009/12/23 |
| C/2009 Y11 | SOHO-1771 | – | 1.0 | – | 0.0057 | – | – | 2009/12/25 |
| C/2009 Y12 | SOHO-1772 | – | 1.0 | – | 0.0051 | – | – | 2009/12/26 |
| C/2009 Y13 | SOHO-1773 | – | 1.0 | – | 0.0054 | – | – | 2009/12/27 |
| C/2009 Y14 | SOHO-1774 | – | 1.0 | – | 0.0075 | – | – | 2009/12/29 |
| C/2009 Y19 | SOHO-1781 | – | 1.0 | – | 0.0048 | – | – | 2010/01/01 |

== 2010s ==
=== 2010 ===
| Comet designation | Name/ discoverer(s) | Period (years) | e | a (AU) | q (AU) | i (°) | Node (°) | Perihelion date |
|---|---|---|---|---|---|---|---|---|
| – | SOHO-4818 | – | 1.0 | – | – | – | – | 2010/03/21 |
| – | SOHO-4819 | – | 1.0 | – | – | – | – | 2010/03/22 |
| – | SOHO-4820 | – | 1.0 | – | – | – | – | 2010/04/17 |
| – | SOHO-4821 | – | 1.0 | – | – | – | – | 2010/06/19 |
| – | SOHO-4822 | – | 1.0 | – | – | – | – | 2010/09/18 |
| – | SOHO-4823 | – | 1.0 | – | – | – | – | 2010/10/25 |

=== 2011 ===
From 2011 onwards, most SOHO comets have not received an official designation from the Minor Planet Center. Exceptions include notable comets like C/2020 X3 (SOHO), which appeared during the total solar eclipse on 14 December 2020.

| Comet designation | Name/ discoverer(s) | Period (years) | e | a (AU) | q (AU) | i (°) | Node (°) | Perihelion date |
|---|---|---|---|---|---|---|---|---|
| – | SOHO-2004 | – | 1.0 | – | – | – | – | 2011/01/04 |
| – | SOHO-2005 | – | 1.0 | – | – | – | – | 2011/01/07 |
| – | SOHO-2006 | – | 1.0 | – | – | – | – | 2011/01/13 |
| – | SOHO-2007 | – | 1.0 | – | – | – | – | 2011/01/13 |
| – | SOHO-2009 | – | 1.0 | – | – | – | – | 2011/01/15 |
| – | SOHO-2010 | – | 1.0 | – | – | – | – | 2011/01/16 |
| – | SOHO-2011 | – | 1.0 | – | – | – | – | 2011/01/16 |
| – | SOHO-2224 | – | 1.0 | – | – | – | – | 2011/01/17 |
| – | SOHO-2012 | – | 1.0 | – | – | – | – | 2011/01/19 |
| – | SOHO-2013 | – | 1.0 | – | – | – | – | 2011/01/22 |
| – | SOHO-2015 | – | 1.0 | – | – | – | – | 2011/01/22 |
| – | SOHO-2014 | – | 1.0 | – | – | – | – | 2011/01/23 |
| – | SOHO-2016 | – | 1.0 | – | – | – | – | 2011/01/24 |
| – | SOHO-2017 | – | 1.0 | – | – | – | – | 2011/01/30 |
| – | SOHO-2576 | – | 1.0 | – | – | – | – | 2011/01/30 |
| C/2011 B1 | SOHO-2018 | – | 1.0 | – | – | – | – | 2011/02/01 |
| – | SOHO-2019 | – | 1.0 | – | – | – | – | 2011/02/02 |
| – | SOHO-2020 | – | 1.0 | – | – | – | – | 2011/02/04 |
| – | SOHO-2021 | – | 1.0 | – | – | – | – | 2011/02/05 |
| – | SOHO-2713 | – | 1.0 | – | – | – | – | 2011/02/06 |
| – | SOHO-2023 | – | 1.0 | – | – | – | – | 2011/02/13 |
| – | SOHO-2025 | – | 1.0 | – | – | – | – | 2011/02/22 |
| – | SOHO-2026 | – | 1.0 | – | – | – | – | 2011/02/23 |
| – | SOHO-2027 | – | 1.0 | – | – | – | – | 2011/02/24 |
| – | SOHO-2028 | – | 1.0 | – | – | – | – | 2011/02/26 |
| – | SOHO-2029 | – | 1.0 | – | – | – | – | 2011/02/26 |
| – | SOHO-2031 | – | 1.0 | – | – | – | – | 2011/02/27 |
| – | SOHO-2058 | – | 1.0 | – | – | – | – | 2011/02/27 |
| – | SOHO-2032 | – | 1.0 | – | – | – | – | 2011/03/02 |
| – | SOHO-2577 | – | 1.0 | – | – | – | – | 2011/03/10 |
| – | SOHO-2034 | – | 1.0 | – | – | – | – | 2011/03/12 |
| – | SOHO-2036 | – | 1.0 | – | – | – | – | 2011/03/22 |
| – | SOHO-2037 | – | 1.0 | – | – | – | – | 2011/03/24 |
| – | SOHO-2038 | – | 1.0 | – | – | – | – | 2011/03/29 |
| – | SOHO-2039 | – | 1.0 | – | – | – | – | 2011/04/06 |
| – | SOHO-2040 | – | 1.0 | – | – | – | – | 2011/04/08 |
| – | SOHO-2041 | – | 1.0 | – | – | – | – | 2011/04/14 |
| – | SOHO-2042 | – | 1.0 | – | – | – | – | 2011/04/15 |
| – | SOHO-2044 | – | 1.0 | – | – | – | – | 2011/04/18 |
| – | SOHO-2045 | – | 1.0 | – | – | – | – | 2011/04/18 |
| – | SOHO-2047 | – | 1.0 | – | – | – | – | 2011/04/19 |
| – | SOHO-2048 | – | 1.0 | – | – | – | – | 2011/04/19 |
| – | SOHO-2049 | – | 1.0 | – | – | – | – | 2011/04/21 |
| – | SOHO-2050 | – | 1.0 | – | – | – | – | 2011/04/23 |
| – | SOHO-2051 | – | 1.0 | – | – | – | – | 2011/04/23 |
| – | SOHO-2052 | – | 1.0 | – | – | – | – | 2011/04/25 |
| – | SOHO-2053 | – | 1.0 | – | – | – | – | 2011/04/25 |
| – | SOHO-2054 | – | 1.0 | – | – | – | – | 2011/04/25 |
| – | SOHO-2055 | – | 1.0 | – | – | – | – | 2011/04/26 |
| – | SOHO-2056 | – | 1.0 | – | – | – | – | 2011/04/26 |
| – | SOHO-2057 | – | 1.0 | – | – | – | – | 2011/04/28 |
| – | SOHO-2060 | – | 1.0 | – | – | – | – | 2011/05/01 |
| – | SOHO-4824 | – | 1.0 | – | – | – | – | 2011/05/04 |
| – | SOHO-2061 | – | 1.0 | – | – | – | – | 2011/05/05 |
| – | SOHO-2062 | – | 1.0 | – | – | – | – | 2011/05/09 |
| – | SOHO-2063 | – | 1.0 | – | – | – | – | 2011/05/10 |
| – | SOHO-2064 | – | 1.0 | – | – | – | – | 2011/05/12 |
| – | SOHO-2065 | – | 1.0 | – | – | – | – | 2011/05/12 |
| – | SOHO-2066 | – | 1.0 | – | – | – | – | 2011/05/14 |
| – | SOHO-2067 | – | 1.0 | – | – | – | – | 2011/05/14 |
| – | SOHO-2072 | – | 1.0 | – | – | – | – | 2011/05/19 |
| – | SOHO-2075 | – | 1.0 | – | – | – | – | 2011/05/20 |
| – | SOHO-2073 | – | 1.0 | – | – | – | – | 2011/05/21 |
| – | SOHO-2074 | – | 1.0 | – | – | – | – | 2011/05/21 |
| – | SOHO-2076 | – | 1.0 | – | – | – | – | 2011/05/21 |
| – | SOHO-2077 | – | 1.0 | – | – | – | – | 2011/05/22 |
| – | SOHO-2078 | – | 1.0 | – | – | – | – | 2011/05/22 |
| – | SOHO-2079 | – | 1.0 | – | – | – | – | 2011/05/24 |
| – | SOHO-2081 | – | 1.0 | – | – | – | – | 2011/05/26 |
| – | SOHO-2082 | – | 1.0 | – | – | – | – | 2011/05/26 |
| – | SOHO-2084 | – | 1.0 | – | – | – | – | 2011/06/01 |
| – | SOHO-2095 | – | 1.0 | – | – | – | – | 2011/06/01 |
| – | SOHO-2085 | – | 1.0 | – | – | – | – | 2011/06/02 |
| – | SOHO-4825 | – | 1.0 | – | – | – | – | 2011/06/03 |
| – | SOHO-2086 | – | 1.0 | – | – | – | – | 2011/06/04 |
| – | SOHO-2087 | – | 1.0 | – | – | – | – | 2011/06/05 |
| – | SOHO-2088 | – | 1.0 | – | – | – | – | 2011/06/06 |
| – | SOHO-2089 | – | 1.0 | – | – | – | – | 2011/06/06 |
| – | SOHO-2090 | – | 1.0 | – | – | – | – | 2011/06/06 |
| – | SOHO-2091 | – | 1.0 | – | – | – | – | 2011/06/07 |
| – | SOHO-2092 | – | 1.0 | – | – | – | – | 2011/06/07 |
| – | SOHO-2093 | – | 1.0 | – | – | – | – | 2011/06/09 |
| – | SOHO-2094 | – | 1.0 | – | – | – | – | 2011/06/09 |
| – | SOHO-2097 | – | 1.0 | – | – | – | – | 2011/06/15 |
| – | SOHO-2098 | – | 1.0 | – | – | – | – | 2011/06/15 |
| – | SOHO-2099 | – | 1.0 | – | – | – | – | 2011/06/15 |
| – | SOHO-2100 | – | 1.0 | – | – | – | – | 2011/06/18 |
| – | SOHO-2101 | – | 1.0 | – | – | – | – | 2011/06/20 |
| – | SOHO-2102 | – | 1.0 | – | – | – | – | 2011/06/20 |
| – | SOHO-2103 | – | 1.0 | – | – | – | – | 2011/06/22 |
| – | SOHO-2104 | – | 1.0 | – | – | – | – | 2011/06/28 |
| – | SOHO-2105 | – | 1.0 | – | – | – | – | 2011/06/28 |
| – | SOHO-2108 | – | 1.0 | – | – | – | – | 2011/07/04 |
| C/2011 N3 | SOHO-2107 | – | 1.00027 | – | 0.0053 | 144.43 | 6.431 | 2011/07/06 |
| – | SOHO-2109 | – | 1.0 | – | – | – | – | 2011/07/08 |
| – | SOHO-2111 | – | 1.0 | – | – | – | – | 2011/07/12 |
| – | SOHO-2112 | – | 1.0 | – | – | – | – | 2011/07/13 |
| – | SOHO-4826 | – | 1.0 | – | – | – | – | 2011/07/25 |
| – | SOHO-2116 | – | 1.0 | – | – | – | – | 2011/07/26 |
| – | SOHO-2117 | – | 1.0 | – | – | – | – | 2011/08/01 |
| – | SOHO-2118 | – | 1.0 | – | – | – | – | 2011/08/03 |
| – | SOHO-2119 | – | 1.0 | – | – | – | – | 2011/08/04 |
| – | SOHO-2120 | – | 1.0 | – | – | – | – | 2011/08/05 |
| – | SOHO-2121 | – | 1.0 | – | – | – | – | 2011/08/09 |
| – | SOHO-2122 | – | 1.0 | – | – | – | – | 2011/08/09 |
| – | SOHO-2123 | – | 1.0 | – | – | – | – | 2011/08/13 |
| – | SOHO-2705 | – | 1.0 | – | – | – | – | 2011/08/15 |
| – | SOHO-2124 | – | 1.0 | – | – | – | – | 2011/08/16 |
| – | SOHO-2125 | – | 1.0 | – | – | – | – | 2011/08/17 |
| – | SOHO-2126 | – | 1.0 | – | – | – | – | 2011/08/19 |
| – | SOHO-2127 | – | 1.0 | – | – | – | – | 2011/08/19 |
| – | SOHO-2128 | – | 1.0 | – | – | – | – | 2011/08/21 |
| – | SOHO-2129 | – | 1.0 | – | – | – | – | 2011/08/23 |
| – | SOHO-2130 | – | 1.0 | – | – | – | – | 2011/08/24 |
| – | SOHO-2131 | – | 1.0 | – | – | – | – | 2011/08/25 |
| – | SOHO-2132 | – | 1.0 | – | – | – | – | 2011/08/31 |
| – | SOHO-2133 | – | 1.0 | – | – | – | – | 2011/09/01 |
| – | SOHO-2135 | – | 1.0 | – | – | – | – | 2011/09/05 |
| – | SOHO-2136 | – | 1.0 | – | – | – | – | 2011/09/07 |
| – | SOHO-2137 | – | 1.0 | – | – | – | – | 2011/09/07 |
| – | SOHO-2138 | – | 1.0 | – | – | – | – | 2011/09/12 |
| – | SOHO-2139 | – | 1.0 | – | – | – | – | 2011/09/14 |
| – | SOHO-2140 | – | 1.0 | – | – | – | – | 2011/09/14 |
| – | SOHO-2578 | – | 1.0 | – | – | – | – | 2011/09/27 |
| – | SOHO-2143 | – | 1.0 | – | – | – | – | 2011/09/30 |
| – | SOHO-2144 | – | 1.0 | – | – | – | – | 2011/10/02 |
| – | SOHO-2145 | – | 1.0 | – | – | – | – | 2011/10/03 |
| – | SOHO-2146 | – | 1.0 | – | – | – | – | 2011/10/08 |
| – | SOHO-2147 | – | 1.0 | – | – | – | – | 2011/10/11 |
| – | SOHO-2148 | – | 1.0 | – | – | – | – | 2011/10/11 |
| – | SOHO-2149 | – | 1.0 | – | – | – | – | 2011/10/12 |
| – | SOHO-2150 | – | 1.0 | – | – | – | – | 2011/10/13 |
| – | SOHO-2151 | – | 1.0 | – | – | – | – | 2011/10/15 |
| – | SOHO-2152 | – | 1.0 | – | – | – | – | 2011/10/16 |
| – | SOHO-2153 | – | 1.0 | – | – | – | – | 2011/10/16 |
| – | SOHO-2154 | – | 1.0 | – | – | – | – | 2011/10/18 |
| – | SOHO-2155 | – | 1.0 | – | – | – | – | 2011/10/21 |
| – | SOHO-2156 | – | 1.0 | – | – | – | – | 2011/10/22 |
| – | SOHO-4827 | – | 1.0 | – | – | – | – | 2011/10/25 |
| – | SOHO-2157 | – | 1.0 | – | – | – | – | 2011/10/27 |
| – | SOHO-2158 | – | 1.0 | – | – | – | – | 2011/10/29 |
| – | SOHO-2159 | – | 1.0 | – | – | – | – | 2011/10/29 |
| – | SOHO-2160 | – | 1.0 | – | – | – | – | 2011/10/29 |
| – | SOHO-2161 | – | 1.0 | – | – | – | – | 2011/10/30 |
| – | SOHO-2162 | – | 1.0 | – | – | – | – | 2011/10/30 |
| – | SOHO-2163 | – | 1.0 | – | – | – | – | 2011/10/30 |
| – | SOHO-2164 | – | 1.0 | – | – | – | – | 2011/10/31 |
| – | SOHO-2165 | – | 1.0 | – | – | – | – | 2011/11/01 |
| – | SOHO-2166 | – | 1.0 | – | – | – | – | 2011/11/02 |
| – | SOHO-2167 | – | 1.0 | – | – | – | – | 2011/11/05 |
| – | SOHO-2168 | – | 1.0 | – | – | – | – | 2011/11/06 |
| – | SOHO-2169 | – | 1.0 | – | – | – | – | 2011/11/07 |
| – | SOHO-2170 | – | 1.0 | – | – | – | – | 2011/11/09 |
| – | SOHO-2171 | – | 1.0 | – | – | – | – | 2011/11/13 |
| – | SOHO-2172 | – | 1.0 | – | – | – | – | 2011/11/14 |
| – | SOHO-2173 | – | 1.0 | – | – | – | – | 2011/11/15 |
| – | SOHO-2174 | – | 1.0 | – | – | – | – | 2011/11/16 |
| – | SOHO-2175 | – | 1.0 | – | – | – | – | 2011/11/16 |
| – | SOHO-2176 | – | 1.0 | – | – | – | – | 2011/11/17 |
| – | SOHO-2177 | – | 1.0 | – | – | – | – | 2011/11/17 |
| – | SOHO-2178 | – | 1.0 | – | – | – | – | 2011/11/17 |
| – | SOHO-4828 | – | 1.0 | – | – | – | – | 2011/11/18 |
| – | SOHO-2179 | – | 1.0 | – | – | – | – | 2011/11/21 |
| – | SOHO-2180 | – | 1.0 | – | – | – | – | 2011/11/21 |
| – | SOHO-2181 | – | 1.0 | – | – | – | – | 2011/11/22 |
| – | SOHO-2183 | – | 1.0 | – | – | – | – | 2011/11/28 |
| – | SOHO-2184 | – | 1.0 | – | – | – | – | 2011/11/29 |
| – | SOHO-2185 | – | 1.0 | – | – | – | – | 2011/11/29 |
| – | SOHO-2186 | – | 1.0 | – | – | – | – | 2011/11/30 |
| – | SOHO-2187 | – | 1.0 | – | – | – | – | 2011/12/01 |
| – | SOHO-2188 | – | 1.0 | – | – | – | – | 2011/12/01 |
| – | SOHO-2189 | – | 1.0 | – | – | – | – | 2011/12/03 |
| – | SOHO-2190 | – | 1.0 | – | – | – | – | 2011/12/06 |
| – | SOHO-2191 | – | 1.0 | – | – | – | – | 2011/12/07 |
| – | SOHO-2192 | – | 1.0 | – | – | – | – | 2011/12/07 |
| – | SOHO-2193 | – | 1.0 | – | – | – | – | 2011/12/08 |
| – | SOHO-2194 | – | 1.0 | – | – | – | – | 2011/12/08 |
| – | SOHO-2195 | – | 1.0 | – | – | – | – | 2011/12/09 |
| – | SOHO-2196 | – | 1.0 | – | – | – | – | 2011/12/10 |
| – | SOHO-2197 | – | 1.0 | – | – | – | – | 2011/12/11 |
| – | SOHO-2198 | – | 1.0 | – | – | – | – | 2011/12/13 |
| – | SOHO-2200 | – | 1.0 | – | – | – | – | 2011/12/13 |
| – | SOHO-2201 | – | 1.0 | – | – | – | – | 2011/12/13 |
| – | SOHO-2208 | – | 1.0 | – | – | – | – | 2011/12/13 |
| – | SOHO-2202 | – | 1.0 | – | – | – | – | 2011/12/14 |
| – | SOHO-2203 | – | 1.0 | – | – | – | – | 2011/12/14 |
| – | SOHO-2204 | – | 1.0 | – | – | – | – | 2011/12/14 |
| – | SOHO-2205 | – | 1.0 | – | – | – | – | 2011/12/15 |
| C/2011 W3 | Lovejoy | 698 | 0.9999294 | 78.7 | 0.0055538 | 134.356 | 326.369 | 2011/12/16 |
| – | SOHO-2206 | – | 1.0 | – | – | – | – | 2011/12/16 |
| – | SOHO-2207 | – | 1.0 | – | – | – | – | 2011/12/16 |
| – | SOHO-2209 | – | 1.0 | – | – | – | – | 2011/12/18 |
| – | SOHO-2210 | – | 1.0 | – | – | – | – | 2011/12/20 |
| – | SOHO-2211 | – | 1.0 | – | – | – | – | 2011/12/25 |
| – | SOHO-2212 | – | 1.0 | – | – | – | – | 2011/12/25 |
| – | SOHO-2213 | – | 1.0 | – | – | – | – | 2011/12/25 |
| – | SOHO-2214 | – | 1.0 | – | – | – | – | 2011/12/26 |
| – | SOHO-2215 | – | 1.0 | – | – | – | – | 2011/12/26 |
| – | SOHO-2216 | – | 1.0 | – | – | – | – | 2011/12/28 |
| – | SOHO-2217 | – | 1.0 | – | – | – | – | 2011/12/31 |

=== 2012 ===
| Comet designation | Name/ discoverer(s) | Period (years) | e | a (AU) | q (AU) | i (°) | Node (°) | Perihelion date |
|---|---|---|---|---|---|---|---|---|
| – | SOHO-2218 | – | 1.0 | – | – | – | – | 2012/01/01 |
| – | SOHO-2219 | – | 1.0 | – | – | – | – | 2012/01/01 |
| – | SOHO-2221 | – | 1.0 | – | – | – | – | 2012/01/09 |
| – | SOHO-2222 | – | 1.0 | – | – | – | – | 2012/01/10 |
| – | SOHO-2223 | – | 1.0 | – | – | – | – | 2012/01/15 |
| – | SOHO-2579 | – | 1.0 | – | – | – | – | 2012/01/19 |
| – | SOHO-2226 | – | 1.0 | – | – | – | – | 2012/01/26 |
| – | SOHO-2227 | – | 1.0 | – | – | – | – | 2012/01/26 |
| – | SOHO-2228 | – | 1.0 | – | – | – | – | 2012/01/28 |
| – | SOHO-2229 | – | 1.0 | – | – | – | – | 2012/01/28 |
| – | SOHO-2230 | – | 1.0 | – | – | – | – | 2012/01/29 |
| – | SOHO-2232 | – | 1.0 | – | – | – | – | 2012/01/31 |
| – | SOHO-2233 | – | 1.0 | – | – | – | – | 2012/01/31 |
| – | SOHO-2234 | – | 1.0 | – | – | – | – | 2012/02/04 |
| – | SOHO-2236 | – | 1.0 | – | – | – | – | 2012/02/04 |
| – | SOHO-2237 | – | 1.0 | – | – | – | – | 2012/02/06 |
| – | SOHO-2238 | – | 1.0 | – | – | – | – | 2012/02/09 |
| – | SOHO-2240 | – | 1.0 | – | – | – | – | 2012/02/14 |
| – | SOHO-2706 | – | 1.0 | – | – | – | – | 2012/02/15 |
| – | SOHO-2241 | – | 1.0 | – | – | – | – | 2012/02/20 |
| – | SOHO-2242 | – | 1.0 | – | – | – | – | 2012/02/21 |
| – | SOHO-2243 | – | 1.0 | – | – | – | – | 2012/02/25 |
| – | SOHO-2244 | – | 1.0 | – | – | – | – | 2012/02/28 |
| – | SOHO-2245 | – | 1.0 | – | – | – | – | 2012/02/28 |
| – | SOHO-2246 | – | 1.0 | – | – | – | – | 2012/02/28 |
| – | SOHO-2248 | – | 1.0 | – | – | – | – | 2012/03/04 |
| – | SOHO-2249 | – | 1.0 | – | – | – | – | 2012/03/11 |
| – | SOHO-2250 | – | 1.0 | – | – | – | – | 2012/03/12 |
| C/2012 E2 | SWAN | – | 1.0 | – | 0.007 | 144.2 | 8 | 2012/03/15 |
| – | SOHO-2255 | – | 1.0 | – | – | – | – | 2012/03/25 |
| – | SOHO-2256 | – | 1.0 | – | – | – | – | 2012/03/30 |
| – | SOHO-2258 | – | 1.0 | – | – | – | – | 2012/04/03 |
| – | SOHO-2260 | – | 1.0 | – | – | – | – | 2012/04/07 |
| – | SOHO-2262 | – | 1.0 | – | – | – | – | 2012/04/10 |
| – | SOHO-2264 | – | 1.0 | – | – | – | – | 2012/04/13 |
| – | SOHO-2266 | – | 1.0 | – | – | – | – | 2012/04/16 |
| – | SOHO-2267 | – | 1.0 | – | – | – | – | 2012/04/17 |
| – | SOHO-2269 | – | 1.0 | – | – | – | – | 2012/04/18 |
| – | SOHO-2270 | – | 1.0 | – | – | – | – | 2012/04/18 |
| – | SOHO-2271 | – | 1.0 | – | – | – | – | 2012/04/19 |
| – | SOHO-2272 | – | 1.0 | – | – | – | – | 2012/04/20 |
| – | SOHO-2273 | – | 1.0 | – | – | – | – | 2012/04/22 |
| – | SOHO-2274 | – | 1.0 | – | – | – | – | 2012/04/22 |
| – | SOHO-2276 | – | 1.0 | – | – | – | – | 2012/04/27 |
| – | SOHO-2277 | – | 1.0 | – | – | – | – | 2012/04/27 |
| – | SOHO-2278 | – | 1.0 | – | – | – | – | 2012/04/28 |
| – | SOHO-2279 | – | 1.0 | – | – | – | – | 2012/04/28 |
| – | SOHO-2280 | – | 1.0 | – | – | – | – | 2012/04/29 |
| – | SOHO-2281 | – | 1.0 | – | – | – | – | 2012/04/30 |
| – | SOHO-2282 | – | 1.0 | – | – | – | – | 2012/05/01 |
| – | SOHO-2284 | – | 1.0 | – | – | – | – | 2012/05/11 |
| – | SOHO-2285 | – | 1.0 | – | – | – | – | 2012/05/14 |
| – | SOHO-2286 | – | 1.0 | – | – | – | – | 2012/05/15 |
| – | SOHO-2287 | – | 1.0 | – | – | – | – | 2012/05/15 |
| – | SOHO-2288 | – | 1.0 | – | – | – | – | 2012/05/16 |
| – | SOHO-2289 | – | 1.0 | – | – | – | – | 2012/05/16 |
| – | SOHO-2290 | – | 1.0 | – | – | – | – | 2012/05/17 |
| – | SOHO-2292 | – | 1.0 | – | – | – | – | 2012/05/18 |
| – | SOHO-2293 | – | 1.0 | – | – | – | – | 2012/05/18 |
| – | SOHO-2294 | – | 1.0 | – | – | – | – | 2012/05/20 |
| – | SOHO-2296 | – | 1.0 | – | – | – | – | 2012/05/24 |
| – | SOHO-2297 | – | 1.0 | – | – | – | – | 2012/05/24 |
| – | SOHO-2298 | – | 1.0 | – | – | – | – | 2012/05/24 |
| – | SOHO-2299 | – | 1.0 | – | – | – | – | 2012/05/27 |
| – | SOHO-2301 | – | 1.0 | – | – | – | – | 2012/05/27 |
| – | SOHO-2300 | – | 1.0 | – | – | – | – | 2012/05/29 |
| – | SOHO-2302 | – | 1.0 | – | – | – | – | 2012/06/02 |
| – | SOHO-2303 | – | 1.0 | – | – | – | – | 2012/06/02 |
| – | SOHO-2304 | – | 1.0 | – | – | – | – | 2012/06/06 |
| – | SOHO-2305 | – | 1.0 | – | – | – | – | 2012/06/06 |
| – | SOHO-2307 | – | 1.0 | – | – | – | – | 2012/06/06 |
| – | SOHO-2306 | – | 1.0 | – | – | – | – | 2012/06/07 |
| – | SOHO-2308 | – | 1.0 | – | – | – | – | 2012/06/08 |
| – | SOHO-2309 | – | 1.0 | – | – | – | – | 2012/06/08 |
| – | SOHO-2310 | – | 1.0 | – | – | – | – | 2012/06/09 |
| – | SOHO-2311 | – | 1.0 | – | – | – | – | 2012/06/09 |
| – | SOHO-2312 | – | 1.0 | – | – | – | – | 2012/06/10 |
| – | SOHO-2314 | – | 1.0 | – | – | – | – | 2012/06/13 |
| – | SOHO-2315 | – | 1.0 | – | – | – | – | 2012/06/13 |
| – | SOHO-2324 | – | 1.0 | – | – | – | – | 2012/06/14 |
| – | SOHO-2316 | – | 1.0 | – | – | – | – | 2012/06/16 |
| – | SOHO-2317 | – | 1.0 | – | – | – | – | 2012/06/16 |
| – | SOHO-2319 | – | 1.0 | – | – | – | – | 2012/06/24 |
| – | SOHO-2320 | – | 1.0 | – | – | – | – | 2012/06/24 |
| – | SOHO-2321 | – | 1.0 | – | – | – | – | 2012/06/24 |
| – | SOHO-2322 | – | 1.0 | – | – | – | – | 2012/06/26 |
| – | SOHO-2323 | – | 1.0 | – | – | – | – | 2012/06/27 |
| – | SOHO-3011 | – | 1.0 | – | – | – | – | 2012/07/01 |
| – | SOHO-2325 | – | 1.0 | – | – | – | – | 2012/07/03 |
| – | SOHO-2326 | – | 1.0 | – | – | – | – | 2012/07/04 |
| – | SOHO-2327 | – | 1.0 | – | – | – | – | 2012/07/07 |
| – | SOHO-2328 | – | 1.0 | – | – | – | – | 2012/07/08 |
| – | SOHO-2329 | – | 1.0 | – | – | – | – | 2012/07/11 |
| – | SOHO-2330 | – | 1.0 | – | – | – | – | 2012/07/12 |
| – | SOHO-2707 | – | 1.0 | – | – | – | – | 2012/07/12 |
| – | SOHO-2331 | – | 1.0 | – | – | – | – | 2012/07/14 |
| – | SOHO-2334 | – | 1.0 | – | – | – | – | 2012/07/19 |
| – | SOHO-2335 | – | 1.0 | – | – | – | – | 2012/07/19 |
| – | SOHO-2337 | – | 1.0 | – | – | – | – | 2012/07/21 |
| – | SOHO-2338 | – | 1.0 | – | – | – | – | 2012/07/25 |
| – | SOHO-2339 | – | 1.0 | – | – | – | – | 2012/07/28 |
| – | SOHO-2340 | – | 1.0 | – | – | – | – | 2012/07/29 |
| – | SOHO-2342 | – | 1.0 | – | – | – | – | 2012/08/01 |
| – | SOHO-2344 | – | 1.0 | – | – | – | – | 2012/08/02 |
| – | SOHO-2345 | – | 1.0 | – | – | – | – | 2012/08/07 |
| – | SOHO-2346 | – | 1.0 | – | – | – | – | 2012/08/07 |
| – | SOHO-2348 | – | 1.0 | – | – | – | – | 2012/08/12 |
| – | SOHO-2349 | – | 1.0 | – | – | – | – | 2012/08/13 |
| – | SOHO-2350 | – | 1.0 | – | – | – | – | 2012/08/18 |
| – | SOHO-2351 | – | 1.0 | – | – | – | – | 2012/08/19 |
| – | SOHO-2352 | – | 1.0 | – | – | – | – | 2012/08/20 |
| – | SOHO-2353 | – | 1.0 | – | – | – | – | 2012/08/20 |
| – | SOHO-2354 | – | 1.0 | – | – | – | – | 2012/08/21 |
| – | SOHO-2356 | – | 1.0 | – | – | – | – | 2012/09/06 |
| – | SOHO-2357 | – | 1.0 | – | – | – | – | 2012/09/09 |
| – | SOHO-2708 | – | 1.0 | – | – | – | – | 2012/09/09 |
| – | SOHO-2359 | – | 1.0 | – | – | – | – | 2012/09/17 |
| – | SOHO-2360 | – | 1.0 | – | – | – | – | 2012/09/17 |
| – | SOHO-2361 | – | 1.0 | – | – | – | – | 2012/09/17 |
| – | SOHO-2362 | – | 1.0 | – | – | – | – | 2012/09/18 |
| – | SOHO-2364 | – | 1.0 | – | – | – | – | 2012/09/18 |
| – | SOHO-2365 | – | 1.0 | – | – | – | – | 2012/09/18 |
| – | SOHO-2366 | – | 1.0 | – | – | – | – | 2012/09/19 |
| – | SOHO-2367 | – | 1.0 | – | – | – | – | 2012/09/19 |
| – | SOHO-2368 | – | 1.0 | – | – | – | – | 2012/09/20 |
| – | SOHO-2370 | – | 1.0 | – | – | – | – | 2012/09/23 |
| – | SOHO-2369 | – | 1.0 | – | – | – | – | 2012/09/28 |
| – | SOHO-2371 | – | 1.0 | – | – | – | – | 2012/10/01 |
| – | SOHO-2372 | – | 1.0 | – | – | – | – | 2012/10/03 |
| – | SOHO-2373 | – | 1.0 | – | – | – | – | 2012/10/03 |
| – | SOHO-2374 | – | 1.0 | – | 0.0054 | 143.98 | 3.12 | 2012/10/05 |
| – | SOHO-2935 | – | 1.0 | – | – | – | – | 2012/10/08 |
| – | SOHO-2375 | – | 1.0 | – | 0.0049 | 144.05 | 1.42 | 2012/10/12 |
| – | SOHO-2376 | – | 1.0 | – | – | – | – | 2012/10/13 |
| – | SOHO-2377 | – | 1.0 | – | – | – | – | 2012/10/13 |
| – | SOHO-2936 | – | 1.0 | – | – | – | – | 2012/10/16 |
| – | SOHO-2379 | – | 1.0 | – | – | – | – | 2012/10/21 |
| – | SOHO-2380 | – | 1.0 | – | – | – | – | 2012/10/21 |
| – | SOHO-2381 | – | 1.0 | – | – | – | – | 2012/10/21 |
| – | SOHO-2382 | – | 1.0 | – | – | – | – | 2012/10/23 |
| – | SOHO-2383 | – | 1.0 | – | – | – | – | 2012/10/23 |
| – | SOHO-2384 | – | 1.0 | – | – | – | – | 2012/10/27 |
| – | SOHO-2385 | – | 1.0 | – | – | – | – | 2012/10/29 |
| – | SOHO-4832 | – | 1.0 | – | – | – | – | 2012/10/30 |
| C/2012 U3 | STEREO (SOHO-2387) | – | 1.0 | – | 0.0053 | 144.14 | 1.45 | 2012/10/31 |
| – | SOHO-2388 | – | 1.0 | – | – | – | – | 2012/11/03 |
| – | SOHO-2488 | – | 1.0 | – | 0.0046 | 144.22 | 0.32 | 2012/11/04 |
| – | SOHO-2389 | – | 1.0 | – | – | – | – | 2012/11/09 |
| – | SOHO-4093 | – | 1.0 | – | – | – | – | 2012/11/11 |
| – | SOHO-2390 | – | 1.0 | – | – | – | – | 2012/11/12 |
| – | SOHO-2391 | – | 1.0 | – | – | – | – | 2012/11/12 |
| – | SOHO-2392 | – | 1.0 | – | – | – | – | 2012/11/13 |
| – | SOHO-2393 | – | 1.0 | – | – | – | – | 2012/11/13 |
| – | SOHO-2394 | – | 1.0 | – | – | – | – | 2012/11/14 |
| – | SOHO-2395 | – | 1.0 | – | – | – | – | 2012/11/15 |
| – | SOHO-2397 | – | 1.0 | – | – | – | – | 2012/11/15 |
| – | SOHO-2396 | – | 1.0 | – | – | – | – | 2012/11/16 |
| – | SOHO-2398 | – | 1.0 | – | – | – | – | 2012/11/16 |
| – | SOHO-2399 | – | 1.0 | – | – | – | – | 2012/11/18 |
| – | SOHO-2401 | – | 1.0 | – | – | – | – | 2012/11/21 |
| – | SOHO-4833 | – | 1.0 | – | – | – | – | 2012/11/23 |
| – | SOHO-2402 | – | 1.0 | – | – | – | – | 2012/11/24 |
| – | SOHO-2403 | – | 1.0 | – | – | – | – | 2012/11/25 |
| – | SOHO-2405 | – | 1.0 | – | – | – | – | 2012/11/25 |
| – | SOHO-2404 | – | 1.0 | – | 0.0047 | 144.13 | 0.94 | 2012/11/26 |
| – | SOHO-2406 | – | 1.0 | – | – | – | – | 2012/11/26 |
| – | SOHO-2407 | – | 1.0 | – | – | – | – | 2012/11/28 |
| – | SOHO-2408 | – | 1.0 | – | – | – | – | 2012/11/28 |
| – | SOHO-2410 | – | 1.0 | – | – | – | – | 2012/12/02 |
| – | SOHO-2411 | – | 1.0 | – | – | – | – | 2012/12/03 |
| – | SOHO-2412 | – | 1.0 | – | – | – | – | 2012/12/04 |
| – | SOHO-2413 | – | 1.0 | – | – | – | – | 2012/12/05 |
| – | SOHO-2414 | – | 1.0 | – | – | – | – | 2012/12/07 |
| – | SOHO-2416 | – | 1.0 | – | – | – | – | 2012/12/13 |
| – | SOHO-2420 | – | 1.0 | – | – | – | – | 2012/12/15 |
| – | SOHO-2417 | – | 1.0 | – | – | – | – | 2012/12/16 |
| – | SOHO-2418 | – | 1.0 | – | – | – | – | 2012/12/16 |
| – | SOHO-2419 | – | 1.0 | – | – | – | – | 2012/12/16 |
| – | SOHO-2422 | – | 1.0 | – | – | – | – | 2012/12/16 |
| – | SOHO-2423 | – | 1.0 | – | – | – | – | 2012/12/17 |
| – | SOHO-2424 | – | 1.0 | – | – | – | – | 2012/12/18 |
| – | SOHO-2425 | – | 1.0 | – | – | – | – | 2012/12/18 |
| – | SOHO-2426 | – | 1.0 | – | – | – | – | 2012/12/20 |
| – | SOHO-2427 | – | 1.0 | – | – | – | – | 2012/12/21 |
| – | SOHO-2429 | – | 1.0 | – | – | – | – | 2012/12/22 |
| – | SOHO-2430 | – | 1.0 | – | – | – | – | 2012/12/23 |
| – | SOHO-2431 | – | 1.0 | – | – | – | – | 2012/12/23 |
| – | SOHO-2432 | – | 1.0 | – | – | – | – | 2012/12/27 |
| – | SOHO-2433 | – | 1.0 | – | – | – | – | 2012/12/27 |
| – | SOHO-2434 | – | 1.0 | – | – | – | – | 2012/12/27 |
| – | SOHO-2439 | – | 1.0 | – | – | – | – | 2012/12/27 |
| – | SOHO-2435 | – | 1.0 | – | – | – | – | 2012/12/29 |
| – | SOHO-2437 | – | 1.0 | – | – | – | – | 2012/12/31 |

=== 2013 ===
| Comet designation | Name/ discoverer(s) | Period (years) | e | a (AU) | q (AU) | i (°) | Node (°) | Perihelion date |

=== 2014 ===
| Comet designation | Name/ discoverer(s) | Period (years) | e | a (AU) | q (AU) | i (°) | Node (°) | Perihelion date |
|---|---|---|---|---|---|---|---|---|
| – | SOHO-4835 | – | 1.0 | – | – | – | – | 2014/03/04 |
| – | SOHO-4840 | – | 1.0 | – | – | – | – | 2014/11/19 |
| – | SOHO-4841 | – | 1.0 | – | – | – | – | 2014/12/06 |

=== 2015 ===
| Comet designation | Name/ discoverer(s) | Period (years) | e | a (AU) | q (AU) | i (°) | Node (°) | Perihelion date |
|---|---|---|---|---|---|---|---|---|
| – | SOHO-4842 | – | 1.0 | – | – | – | – | 2015/11/04 |
| – | SOHO-4843 | – | 1.0 | – | – | – | – | 2015/12/12 |

=== 2016 ===
| Comet designation | Name/ discoverer(s) | Period (years) | e | a (AU) | q (AU) | i (°) | Node (°) | Perihelion date |
|---|---|---|---|---|---|---|---|---|
| – | SOHO-4844 | – | 1.0 | – | – | – | – | 2016/05/03 |
| – | SOHO-4845 | – | 1.0 | – | – | – | – | 2016/05/03 |
| – | SOHO-4846 | – | 1.0 | – | – | – | – | 2016/05/05 |
| – | SOHO-4847 | – | 1.0 | – | – | – | – | 2016/05/13 |
| – | SOHO-3109 | 850 | 0.9999 | 90 | 0.007 | 135.5 | 21.8 | 2016/08/04 |

=== 2017 ===
| Comet designation | Name/ discoverer(s) | Period (years) | e | a (AU) | q (AU) | i (°) | Node (°) | Perihelion date |

=== 2018 ===
| Comet designation | Name/ discoverer(s) | Period (years) | e | a (AU) | q (AU) | i (°) | Node (°) | Perihelion date |
|---|---|---|---|---|---|---|---|---|
| – | SOHO-3947 | – | 1.0 | – | – | – | – | 2018/03/23 |
| – | SOHO-4879 | – | 1.0 | – | – | – | – | 2018/03/31 |
| – | SOHO-3948 | – | 1.0 | – | – | – | – | 2018/04/01 |
| – | SOHO-3949 | – | 1.0 | – | – | – | – | 2018/04/05 |
| – | SOHO-3950 | – | 1.0 | – | – | – | – | 2018/04/18 |
| – | SOHO-3951 | – | 1.0 | – | – | – | – | 2018/04/28 |
| – | SOHO-4855 | – | 1.0 | – | – | – | – | 2018/06/05 |
| – | SOHO-4856 | – | 1.0 | – | – | – | – | 2018/10/07 |
| – | SOHO-4857 | – | 1.0 | – | – | – | – | 2018/12/06 |

=== 2019 ===
| Comet designation | Name/ discoverer(s) | Period (years) | e | a (AU) | q (AU) | i (°) | Node (°) | Perihelion date |
|---|---|---|---|---|---|---|---|---|
| – | SOHO-3680 | – | 1.0 | – | – | – | – | 2019/01/19 |
| – | SOHO-3681 | – | 1.0 | – | – | – | – | 2019/01/21 |
| – | SOHO-3682 | – | 1.0 | – | – | – | – | 2019/02/05 |
| – | SOHO-3683 | – | 1.0 | – | – | – | – | 2019/02/09 |
| – | SOHO-3684 | – | 1.0 | – | – | – | – | 2019/02/10 |
| – | SOHO-3685 | – | 1.0 | – | – | – | – | 2019/02/11 |
| – | SOHO-3688 | – | 1.0 | – | – | – | – | 2019/02/27 |
| – | SOHO-3689 | – | 1.0 | – | – | – | – | 2019/03/03 |
| – | SOHO-3690 | – | 1.0 | – | – | – | – | 2019/03/08 |
| – | SOHO-3691 | – | 1.0 | – | – | – | – | 2019/03/09 |
| – | SOHO-3692 | – | 1.0 | – | – | – | – | 2019/03/12 |
| – | SOHO-3694 | – | 1.0 | – | – | – | – | 2019/03/16 |
| – | SOHO-3695 | – | 1.0 | – | – | – | – | 2019/03/21 |
| – | SOHO-3696 | – | 1.0 | – | – | – | – | 2019/03/22 |
| – | SOHO-3697 | – | 1.0 | – | – | – | – | 2019/03/23 |
| – | SOHO-3698 | – | 1.0 | – | – | – | – | 2019/03/27 |
| – | SOHO-3699 | – | 1.0 | – | – | – | – | 2019/03/28 |
| – | SOHO-3701 | – | 1.0 | – | – | – | – | 2019/03/30 |
| – | SOHO-3702 | – | 1.0 | – | – | – | – | 2019/03/31 |
| – | SOHO-3703 | – | 1.0 | – | – | – | – | 2019/03/31 |
| – | SOHO-3706 | – | 1.0 | – | – | – | – | 2019/04/01 |
| – | SOHO-3707 | – | 1.0 | – | – | – | – | 2019/04/03 |
| – | SOHO-3708 | – | 1.0 | – | – | – | – | 2019/04/06 |
| – | SOHO-3709 | – | 1.0 | – | – | – | – | 2019/04/07 |
| – | SOHO-3710 | – | 1.0 | – | – | – | – | 2019/04/07 |
| – | SOHO-3711 | – | 1.0 | – | – | – | – | 2019/04/08 |
| – | SOHO-3712 | – | 1.0 | – | – | – | – | 2019/04/08 |
| – | SOHO-3713 | – | 1.0 | – | – | – | – | 2019/04/09 |
| – | SOHO-3714 | – | 1.0 | – | – | – | – | 2019/04/13 |
| – | SOHO-3715 | – | 1.0 | – | – | – | – | 2019/04/14 |
| – | SOHO-3716 | – | 1.0 | – | – | – | – | 2019/04/17 |
| – | SOHO-3717 | – | 1.0 | – | – | – | – | 2019/04/17 |
| – | SOHO-3718 | – | 1.0 | – | – | – | – | 2019/04/19 |
| – | SOHO-3719 | – | 1.0 | – | – | – | – | 2019/04/22 |
| – | SOHO-3720 | – | 1.0 | – | – | – | – | 2019/04/23 |
| – | SOHO-3721 | – | 1.0 | – | – | – | – | 2019/04/24 |
| – | SOHO-3723 | – | 1.0 | – | – | – | – | 2019/04/25 |
| – | SOHO-3724 | – | 1.0 | – | – | – | – | 2019/04/26 |
| – | SOHO-3725 | – | 1.0 | – | – | – | – | 2019/04/26 |
| – | SOHO-3726 | – | 1.0 | – | – | – | – | 2019/04/27 |
| – | SOHO-3727 | – | 1.0 | – | – | – | – | 2019/04/28 |
| – | SOHO-3728 | – | 1.0 | – | – | – | – | 2019/04/29 |
| – | SOHO-3729 | – | 1.0 | – | – | – | – | 2019/04/30 |
| – | SOHO-3730 | – | 1.0 | – | – | – | – | 2019/05/02 |
| – | SOHO-3731 | – | 1.0 | – | – | – | – | 2019/05/05 |
| – | SOHO-3732 | – | 1.0 | – | – | – | – | 2019/05/08 |
| – | SOHO-3734 | – | 1.0 | – | – | – | – | 2019/05/10 |
| – | SOHO-3735 | – | 1.0 | – | – | – | – | 2019/05/10 |
| – | SOHO-3736 | – | 1.0 | – | – | – | – | 2019/05/11 |
| – | SOHO-3738 | – | 1.0 | – | – | – | – | 2019/05/15 |
| – | SOHO-3739 | – | 1.0 | – | – | – | – | 2019/05/15 |
| – | SOHO-3740 | – | 1.0 | – | – | – | – | 2019/05/20 |
| – | SOHO-3741 | – | 1.0 | – | – | – | – | 2019/05/21 |
| – | SOHO-3742 | – | 1.0 | – | – | – | – | 2019/05/22 |
| – | SOHO-3743 | – | 1.0 | – | – | – | – | 2019/05/22 |
| – | SOHO-3744 | – | 1.0 | – | – | – | – | 2019/05/23 |
| – | SOHO-3745 | – | 1.0 | – | – | – | – | 2019/05/24 |
| – | SOHO-3746 | – | 1.0 | – | – | – | – | 2019/05/26 |
| – | SOHO-3747 | – | 1.0 | – | – | – | – | 2019/05/27 |
| – | SOHO-3748 | – | 1.0 | – | – | – | – | 2019/05/27 |
| – | SOHO-3749 | – | 1.0 | – | – | – | – | 2019/05/27 |
| – | SOHO-3750 | – | 1.0 | – | – | – | – | 2019/05/29 |
| – | SOHO-3751 | – | 1.0 | – | – | – | – | 2019/05/29 |
| – | SOHO-3752 | – | 1.0 | – | – | – | – | 2019/05/29 |
| – | SOHO-3753 | – | 1.0 | – | – | – | – | 2019/05/30 |
| – | SOHO-3754 | – | 1.0 | – | – | – | – | 2019/05/30 |
| – | SOHO-4858 | – | 1.0 | – | – | – | – | 2019/05/30 |
| – | SOHO-3755 | – | 1.0 | – | – | – | – | 2019/05/31 |
| – | SOHO-3756 | – | 1.0 | – | – | – | – | 2019/05/31 |
| – | SOHO-3757 | – | 1.0 | – | – | – | – | 2019/06/01 |
| – | SOHO-3758 | – | 1.0 | – | – | – | – | 2019/06/01 |
| – | SOHO-3759 | – | 1.0 | – | – | – | – | 2019/06/03 |
| – | SOHO-3760 | – | 1.0 | – | – | – | – | 2019/06/03 |
| – | SOHO-3761 | – | 1.0 | – | – | – | – | 2019/06/05 |
| – | SOHO-3762 | – | 1.0 | – | – | – | – | 2019/06/05 |
| – | SOHO-4859 | – | 1.0 | – | – | – | – | 2015/06/05 |
| – | SOHO-3763 | – | 1.0 | – | – | – | – | 2019/06/06 |
| – | SOHO-3764 | – | 1.0 | – | – | – | – | 2019/06/07 |
| – | SOHO-3765 | – | 1.0 | – | – | – | – | 2019/06/09 |
| – | SOHO-3766 | – | 1.0 | – | – | – | – | 2019/06/10 |
| – | SOHO-3767 | – | 1.0 | – | – | – | – | 2019/06/10 |
| – | SOHO-3769 | – | 1.0 | – | – | – | – | 2019/06/12 |
| – | SOHO-3768 | – | 1.0 | – | – | – | – | 2019/06/13 |
| – | SOHO-3770 | – | 1.0 | – | – | – | – | 2019/06/16 |
| – | SOHO-3771 | – | 1.0 | – | – | – | – | 2019/06/18 |
| – | SOHO-3772 | – | 1.0 | – | – | – | – | 2019/06/18 |
| – | SOHO-3773 | – | 1.0 | – | – | – | – | 2019/06/18 |
| – | SOHO-3775 | – | 1.0 | – | – | – | – | 2019/06/21 |
| – | SOHO-3776 | – | 1.0 | – | – | – | – | 2019/06/23 |
| – | SOHO-3777 | – | 1.0 | – | – | – | – | 2019/06/25 |
| – | SOHO-3778 | – | 1.0 | – | – | – | – | 2019/06/27 |
| – | SOHO-3779 | – | 1.0 | – | – | – | – | 2019/06/28 |
| – | SOHO-3780 | – | 1.0 | – | – | – | – | 2019/06/28 |
| – | SOHO-3781 | – | 1.0 | – | – | – | – | 2019/06/29 |
| – | SOHO-3782 | – | 1.0 | – | – | – | – | 2019/06/30 |
| – | SOHO-3796 | – | 1.0 | – | – | – | – | 2019/07/07 |
| – | SOHO-3797 | – | 1.0 | – | – | – | – | 2019/07/08 |
| – | SOHO-3798 | – | 1.0 | – | – | – | – | 2019/07/10 |
| – | SOHO-3799 | – | 1.0 | – | – | – | – | 2019/07/13 |
| – | SOHO-3801 | – | 1.0 | – | – | – | – | 2019/07/13 |
| – | SOHO-5076 | – | 1.0 | – | – | – | – | 2019/07/14 |
| – | SOHO-3802 | – | 1.0 | – | – | – | – | 2019/07/16 |
| – | SOHO-3803 | – | 1.0 | – | – | – | – | 2019/07/18 |
| – | SOHO-3805 | – | 1.0 | – | – | – | – | 2019/07/22 |
| – | SOHO-3806 | – | 1.0 | – | – | – | – | 2019/07/27 |
| – | SOHO-3807 | – | 1.0 | – | – | – | – | 2019/07/28 |
| – | SOHO-3808 | – | 1.0 | – | – | – | – | 2019/07/29 |
| – | SOHO-3810 | – | 1.0 | – | – | – | – | 2019/07/31 |
| – | SOHO-3812 | – | 1.0 | – | – | – | – | 2019/08/11 |
| – | SOHO-3813 | – | 1.0 | – | – | – | – | 2019/08/13 |
| – | SOHO-3814 | – | 1.0 | – | – | – | – | 2019/08/14 |
| – | SOHO-3815 | – | 1.0 | – | – | – | – | 2019/08/14 |
| – | SOHO-3816 | – | 1.0 | – | – | – | – | 2019/08/22 |
| – | SOHO-3817 | – | 1.0 | – | – | – | – | 2019/08/23 |
| – | SOHO-3818 | – | 1.0 | – | – | – | – | 2019/08/23 |
| – | SOHO-3822 | – | 1.0 | – | – | – | – | 2019/08/29 |
| – | SOHO-3823 | – | 1.0 | – | – | – | – | 2019/08/31 |
| – | SOHO-3824 | – | 1.0 | – | – | – | – | 2019/09/05 |
| – | SOHO-3825 | – | 1.0 | – | – | – | – | 2019/09/10 |
| – | SOHO-3826 | – | 1.0 | – | – | – | – | 2019/09/10 |
| – | SOHO-3828 | – | 1.0 | – | – | – | – | 2019/09/13 |
| – | SOHO-3829 | – | 1.0 | – | – | – | – | 2019/09/22 |
| – | SOHO-3830 | – | 1.0 | – | – | – | – | 2019/09/23 |
| – | SOHO-3831 | – | 1.0 | – | – | – | – | 2019/10/03 |
| – | SOHO-3832 | – | 1.0 | – | – | – | – | 2019/10/03 |
| – | SOHO-3833 | – | 1.0 | – | – | – | – | 2019/10/05 |
| – | SOHO-3834 | – | 1.0 | – | – | – | – | 2019/10/06 |
| – | SOHO-3835 | – | 1.0 | – | – | – | – | 2019/10/08 |
| – | SOHO-3836 | – | 1.0 | – | – | – | – | 2019/10/08 |
| – | SOHO-3837 | – | 1.0 | – | – | – | – | 2019/10/11 |
| – | SOHO-3838 | – | 1.0 | – | – | – | – | 2019/10/13 |
| – | SOHO-3839 | – | 1.0 | – | – | – | – | 2019/10/14 |
| – | SOHO-3840 | – | 1.0 | – | – | – | – | 2019/10/21 |
| – | SOHO-3842 | – | 1.0 | – | – | – | – | 2019/10/23 |
| – | SOHO-3843 | – | 1.0 | – | – | – | – | 2019/10/23 |
| – | SOHO-3844 | – | 1.0 | – | – | – | – | 2019/10/27 |
| – | SOHO-3845 | – | 1.0 | – | – | – | – | 2019/10/29 |
| – | SOHO-3846 | – | 1.0 | – | – | – | – | 2019/10/29 |
| – | SOHO-3847 | – | 1.0 | – | – | – | – | 2019/10/31 |
| – | SOHO-3848 | – | 1.0 | – | – | – | – | 2019/11/01 |
| – | SOHO-3849 | – | 1.0 | – | – | – | – | 2019/11/03 |
| – | SOHO-3854 | – | 1.0 | – | – | – | – | 2019/11/07 |
| – | SOHO-3855 | – | 1.0 | – | – | – | – | 2019/11/09 |
| – | SOHO-3856 | – | 1.0 | – | – | – | – | 2019/11/12 |
| – | SOHO-3857 | – | 1.0 | – | – | – | – | 2019/11/12 |
| – | SOHO-3858 | – | 1.0 | – | – | – | – | 2019/11/13 |
| – | SOHO-3859 | – | 1.0 | – | – | – | – | 2019/11/16 |
| – | SOHO-3860 | – | 1.0 | – | – | – | – | 2019/11/17 |
| – | SOHO-3861 | – | 1.0 | – | – | – | – | 2019/11/19 |
| – | SOHO-3862 | – | 1.0 | – | – | – | – | 2019/11/21 |
| – | SOHO-3863 | – | 1.0 | – | – | – | – | 2019/11/21 |
| – | SOHO-3864 | – | 1.0 | – | – | – | – | 2019/11/21 |
| – | SOHO-3865 | – | 1.0 | – | – | – | – | 2019/11/23 |
| – | SOHO-3866 | – | 1.0 | – | – | – | – | 2019/11/23 |
| – | SOHO-3867 | – | 1.0 | – | – | – | – | 2019/11/25 |
| – | SOHO-3868 | – | 1.0 | – | – | – | – | 2019/11/27 |
| – | SOHO-3869 | – | 1.0 | – | – | – | – | 2019/11/27 |
| – | SOHO-3871 | – | 1.0 | – | – | – | – | 2019/11/28 |
| – | SOHO-3873 | – | 1.0 | – | – | – | – | 2019/11/30 |
| – | SOHO-3874 | – | 1.0 | – | – | – | – | 2019/12/02 |
| – | SOHO-3875 | – | 1.0 | – | – | – | – | 2019/12/04 |
| – | SOHO-3876 | – | 1.0 | – | – | – | – | 2019/12/05 |
| – | SOHO-3878 | – | 1.0 | – | – | – | – | 2019/12/07 |
| – | SOHO-3880 | – | 1.0 | – | – | – | – | 2019/12/09 |
| – | SOHO-3881 | – | 1.0 | – | – | – | – | 2019/12/10 |
| – | SOHO-3883 | – | 1.0 | – | – | – | – | 2019/12/18 |
| – | SOHO-3884 | – | 1.0 | – | – | – | – | 2019/12/19 |
| – | SOHO-3886 | – | 1.0 | – | – | – | – | 2019/12/20 |
| – | SOHO-3887 | – | 1.0 | – | – | – | – | 2019/12/22 |
| – | SOHO-3888 | – | 1.0 | – | – | – | – | 2019/12/23 |
| – | SOHO-3889 | – | 1.0 | – | – | – | – | 2019/12/29 |

== 2020s ==
=== 2020 ===
| Comet designation | Name/ discoverer(s) | Period (years) | e | a (AU) | q (AU) | i (°) | Node (°) | Perihelion date |
|---|---|---|---|---|---|---|---|---|
| – | SOHO-3890 | – | 1.0 | – | – | – | – | 2020/01/13 |
| – | SOHO-3891 | – | 1.0 | – | – | – | – | 2020/01/19 |
| – | SOHO-3892 | – | 1.0 | – | – | – | – | 2020/01/20 |
| – | SOHO-3894 | – | 1.0 | – | – | – | – | 2020/01/29 |
| – | SOHO-3896 | – | 1.0 | – | – | – | – | 2020/01/31 |
| – | SOHO-3897 | – | 1.0 | – | – | – | – | 2020/01/05 |
| – | SOHO-3898 | – | 1.0 | – | – | – | – | 2020/02/07 |
| – | SOHO-3899 | – | 1.0 | – | – | – | – | 2020/02/08 |
| – | SOHO-3900 | – | 1.0 | – | – | – | – | 2020/02/09 |
| – | SOHO-3901 | – | 1.0 | – | – | – | – | 2020/02/09 |
| – | SOHO-3902 | – | 1.0 | – | – | – | – | 2020/02/10 |
| – | SOHO-3903 | – | 1.0 | – | – | – | – | 2020/02/12 |
| – | SOHO-3904 | – | 1.0 | – | – | – | – | 2020/02/20 |
| – | SOHO-3905 | – | 1.0 | – | – | – | – | 2020/02/22 |
| – | SOHO-3906 | – | 1.0 | – | – | – | – | 2020/02/25 |
| – | SOHO-3907 | – | 1.0 | – | – | – | – | 2020/02/29 |
| – | SOHO-3908 | – | 1.0 | – | – | – | – | 2020/03/06 |
| – | SOHO-3911 | – | 1.0 | – | – | – | – | 2020/03/10 |
| – | SOHO-3912 | – | 1.0 | – | – | – | – | 2020/03/10 |
| – | SOHO-3913 | – | 1.0 | – | – | – | – | 2020/03/12 |
| – | SOHO-3914 | – | 1.0 | – | – | – | – | 2020/03/12 |
| – | SOHO-3915 | – | 1.0 | – | – | – | – | 2020/03/13 |
| – | SOHO-3916 | – | 1.0 | – | – | – | – | 2020/03/14 |
| – | SOHO-3917 | – | 1.0 | – | – | – | – | 2020/03/18 |
| – | SOHO-3918 | – | 1.0 | – | – | – | – | 2020/03/22 |
| – | SOHO-3919 | – | 1.0 | – | – | – | – | 2020/03/23 |
| – | SOHO-3947 | – | 1.0 | – | – | – | – | 2020/03/23 |
| – | SOHO-3920 | – | 1.0 | – | – | – | – | 2020/03/26 |
| – | SOHO-3948 | – | 1.0 | – | – | – | – | 2020/04/01 |
| – | SOHO-3922 | – | 1.0 | – | – | – | – | 2020/04/04 |
| – | SOHO-3923 | – | 1.0 | – | – | – | – | 2020/04/04 |
| – | SOHO-3949 | – | 1.0 | – | – | – | – | 2020/04/05 |
| – | SOHO-3924 | – | 1.0 | – | – | – | – | 2020/04/06 |
| – | SOHO-3925 | – | 1.0 | – | – | – | – | 2020/04/09 |
| – | SOHO-3926 | – | 1.0 | – | – | – | – | 2020/04/10 |
| – | SOHO-3927 | – | 1.0 | – | – | – | – | 2020/04/10 |
| – | SOHO-3928 | – | 1.0 | – | – | – | – | 2020/04/14 |
| – | SOHO-3953 | – | 1.0 | – | – | – | – | 2020/04/12 |
| – | SOHO-3929 | – | 1.0 | – | – | – | – | 2020/04/17 |
| – | SOHO-3930 | – | 1.0 | – | – | – | – | 2020/04/17 |
| – | SOHO-3950 | – | 1.0 | – | – | – | – | 2020/04/18 |
| – | SOHO-3933 | – | 1.0 | – | – | – | – | 2020/04/21 |
| – | SOHO-3937 | – | 1.0 | – | – | – | – | 2020/04/22 |
| – | SOHO-3937 | – | 1.0 | – | – | – | – | 2020/04/23 |
| – | SOHO-3934 | – | 1.0 | – | – | – | – | 2020/04/25 |
| – | SOHO-3935 | – | 1.0 | – | – | – | – | 2020/04/27 |
| – | SOHO-3951 | – | 1.0 | – | – | – | – | 2020/04/28 |
| – | SOHO-3936 | – | 1.0 | – | – | – | – | 2020/04/29 |
| – | SOHO-3954 | – | 1.0 | – | – | – | – | 2020/05/01 |
| – | SOHO-3955 | – | 1.0 | – | – | – | – | 2020/05/02 |
| – | SOHO-3956 | – | 1.0 | – | – | – | – | 2020/05/08 |
| – | SOHO-3957 | – | 1.0 | – | – | – | – | 2020/05/10 |
| – | SOHO-3958 | – | 1.0 | – | – | – | – | 2020/05/10 |
| – | SOHO-3959 | – | 1.0 | – | – | – | – | 2020/05/10 |
| – | SOHO-3960 | – | 1.0 | – | – | – | – | 2020/05/10 |
| – | SOHO-3961 | – | 1.0 | – | – | – | – | 2020/05/11 |
| – | SOHO-3962 | – | 1.0 | – | – | – | – | 2020/05/12 |
| – | SOHO-3963 | – | 1.0 | – | – | – | – | 2020/05/14 |
| – | SOHO-3964 | – | 1.0 | – | – | – | – | 2020/05/18 |
| – | SOHO-3965 | – | 1.0 | – | – | – | – | 2020/05/18 |
| – | SOHO-4860 | – | 1.0 | – | – | – | – | 2020/05/18 |
| – | SOHO-3966 | – | 1.0 | – | – | – | – | 2020/05/19 |
| – | SOHO-3979 | – | 1.0 | – | – | – | – | 2020/05/19 |
| – | SOHO-3967 | – | 1.0 | – | – | – | – | 2020/05/20 |
| – | SOHO-3969 | – | 1.0 | – | – | – | – | 2020/05/22 |
| – | SOHO-3971 | – | 1.0 | – | – | – | – | 2020/05/23 |
| – | SOHO-3962 | – | 1.0 | – | – | – | – | 2020/05/26 |
| – | SOHO-3973 | – | 1.0 | – | – | – | – | 2020/05/28 |
| – | SOHO-3974 | – | 1.0 | – | – | – | – | 2020/05/29 |
| – | SOHO-3978 | – | 1.0 | – | – | – | – | 2020/05/30 |
| – | SOHO-3977 | – | 1.0 | – | – | – | – | 2020/05/31 |
| – | SOHO-3980 | – | 1.0 | – | – | – | – | 2020/06/01 |
| – | SOHO-3981 | – | 1.0 | – | – | – | – | 2020/06/01 |
| – | SOHO-3982 | – | 1.0 | – | – | – | – | 2020/06/02 |
| – | SOHO-3983 | – | 1.0 | – | – | – | – | 2020/06/03 |
| – | SOHO-4861 | – | 1.0 | – | – | – | – | 2020/06/04 |
| – | SOHO-3984 | – | 1.0 | – | – | – | – | 2020/06/05 |
| – | SOHO-3985 | – | 1.0 | – | – | – | – | 2020/06/06 |
| – | SOHO-3986 | – | 1.0 | – | – | – | – | 2020/06/06 |
| – | SOHO-3987 | – | 1.0 | – | – | – | – | 2020/06/06 |
| – | SOHO-3988 | – | 1.0 | – | – | – | – | 2020/06/06 |
| – | SOHO-3989 | – | 1.0 | – | – | – | – | 2020/06/07 |
| – | SOHO-3990 | – | 1.0 | – | – | – | – | 2020/06/08 |
| – | SOHO-3991 | – | 1.0 | – | – | – | – | 2020/06/08 |
| – | SOHO-3992 | – | 1.0 | – | – | – | – | 2020/06/08 |
| – | SOHO-3993 | – | 1.0 | – | – | – | – | 2020/06/09 |
| – | SOHO-3994 | – | 1.0 | – | – | – | – | 2020/06/09 |
| – | SOHO-3995 | – | 1.0 | – | – | – | – | 2020/06/09 |
| – | SOHO-3996 | – | 1.0 | – | – | – | – | 2020/06/09 |
| – | SOHO-3997 | – | 1.0 | – | – | – | – | 2020/06/09 |
| – | SOHO-3998 | – | 1.0 | – | – | – | – | 2020/06/14 |
| – | SOHO-3999 | – | 1.0 | – | – | – | – | 2020/06/16 |
| – | SOHO-4000 | – | 1.0 | – | – | – | – | 2020/06/16 |
| – | SOHO-4001 | – | 1.0 | – | – | – | – | 2020/06/16 |
| – | SOHO-4004 | – | 1.0 | – | – | – | – | 2020/06/16 |
| – | SOHO-4002 | – | 1.0 | – | – | – | – | 2020/06/17 |
| – | SOHO-4005 | – | 1.0 | – | – | – | – | 2020/06/17 |
| – | SOHO-4006 | – | 1.0 | – | – | – | – | 2020/06/18 |
| – | SOHO-4007 | – | 1.0 | – | – | – | – | 2020/06/20 |
| – | SOHO-4009 | – | 1.0 | – | – | – | – | 2020/06/21 |
| – | SOHO-4010 | – | 1.0 | – | – | – | – | 2020/06/20 |
| – | SOHO-4011 | – | 1.0 | – | – | – | – | 2020/06/22 |
| – | SOHO-4012 | – | 1.0 | – | – | – | – | 2020/06/24 |
| – | SOHO-4013 | – | 1.0 | – | – | – | – | 2020/06/24 |
| – | SOHO-4014 | – | 1.0 | – | – | – | – | 2020/06/27 |
| – | SOHO-4015 | – | 1.0 | – | – | – | – | 2020/06/28 |
| – | SOHO-4016 | – | 1.0 | – | – | – | – | 2020/06/29 |
| – | SOHO-4017 | – | 1.0 | – | – | – | – | 2020/06/29 |
| – | SOHO-4018 | – | 1.0 | – | – | – | – | 2020/06/29 |
| – | SOHO-4019 | – | 1.0 | – | – | – | – | 2020/07/03 |
| – | SOHO-4020 | – | 1.0 | – | – | – | – | 2020/07/03 |
| – | SOHO-4021 | – | 1.0 | – | – | – | – | 2020/07/04 |
| – | SOHO-4022 | – | 1.0 | – | – | – | – | 2020/07/04 |
| – | SOHO-4023 | – | 1.0 | – | – | – | – | 2020/07/05 |
| – | SOHO-4024 | – | 1.0 | – | – | – | – | 2020/07/05 |
| – | SOHO-4025 | – | 1.0 | – | – | – | – | 2020/07/08 |
| – | SOHO-4026 | – | 1.0 | – | – | – | – | 2020/07/10 |
| – | SOHO-4027 | – | 1.0 | – | – | – | – | 2020/07/15 |
| – | SOHO-4028 | – | 1.0 | – | – | – | – | 2020/07/16 |
| – | SOHO-4029 | – | 1.0 | – | – | – | – | 2020/07/19 |
| – | SOHO-4030 | – | 1.0 | – | – | – | – | 2020/07/21 |
| – | SOHO-4031 | – | 1.0 | – | – | – | – | 2020/07/22 |
| – | SOHO-4033 | – | 1.0 | – | – | – | – | 2020/07/27 |
| – | SOHO-4034 | – | 1.0 | – | – | – | – | 2020/07/27 |
| – | SOHO-4035 | – | 1.0 | – | – | – | – | 2020/07/31 |
| – | SOHO-4045 | – | 1.0 | – | – | – | – | 2020/08/02 |
| – | SOHO-4050 | – | 1.0 | – | – | – | – | 2020/08/12 |
| – | SOHO-4051 | – | 1.0 | – | – | – | – | 2020/08/13 |
| – | SOHO-4052 | – | 1.0 | – | – | – | – | 2020/08/13 |
| – | SOHO-4053 | – | 1.0 | – | – | – | – | 2020/08/17 |
| – | SOHO-4054 | – | 1.0 | – | – | – | – | 2020/08/21 |
| – | SOHO-4056 | – | 1.0 | – | – | – | – | 2020/08/25 |
| – | SOHO-4057 | – | 1.0 | – | – | – | – | 2020/08/29 |
| – | SOHO-4058 | – | 1.0 | – | – | – | – | 2020/08/31 |
| – | SOHO-4060 | – | 1.0 | – | – | – | – | 2020/09/09 |
| – | SOHO-4061 | – | 1.0 | – | – | – | – | 2020/09/09 |
| – | SOHO-4062 | – | 1.0 | – | – | – | – | 2020/09/10 |
| – | SOHO-4063 | – | 1.0 | – | – | – | – | 2020/09/13 |
| – | SOHO-4065 | – | 1.0 | – | – | – | – | 2020/09/15 |
| – | SOHO-4066 | – | 1.0 | – | – | – | – | 2020/09/16 |
| – | SOHO-4067 | – | 1.0 | – | – | – | – | 2020/09/24 |
| – | SOHO-4068 | – | 1.0 | – | – | – | – | 2020/09/28 |
| – | SOHO-4069 | – | 1.0 | – | – | – | – | 2020/09/30 |
| – | SOHO-4070 | – | 1.0 | – | – | – | – | 2020/09/30 |
| – | SOHO-4071 | – | 1.0 | – | – | – | – | 2020/10/03 |
| – | SOHO-4072 | – | 1.0 | – | – | – | – | 2020/10/08 |
| – | SOHO-4073 | – | 1.0 | – | – | – | – | 2020/10/11 |
| – | SOHO-4074 | – | 1.0 | – | – | – | – | 2020/10/13 |
| – | SOHO-4075 | – | 1.0 | – | – | – | – | 2020/10/15 |
| – | SOHO-4076 | – | 1.0 | – | – | – | – | 2020/10/18 |
| – | SOHO-4077 | – | 1.0 | – | – | – | – | 2020/10/21 |
| – | SOHO-4079 | – | 1.0 | – | – | – | – | 2020/10/25 |
| – | SOHO-4082 | – | 1.0 | – | – | – | – | 2020/10/26 |
| – | SOHO-4081 | – | 1.0 | – | – | – | – | 2020/10/28 |
| – | SOHO-4083 | – | 1.0 | – | – | – | – | 2020/11/03 |
| – | SOHO-4084 | – | 1.0 | – | – | – | – | 2020/11/04 |
| – | SOHO-4085 | – | 1.0 | – | – | – | – | 2020/11/05 |
| – | SOHO-4086 | – | 1.0 | – | – | – | – | 2020/11/07 |
| – | SOHO-4087 | – | 1.0 | – | – | – | – | 2020/11/07 |
| – | SOHO-4088 | – | 1.0 | – | – | – | – | 2020/11/07 |
| – | SOHO-4089 | – | 1.0 | – | – | – | – | 2020/11/08 |
| – | SOHO-4090 | – | 1.0 | – | – | – | – | 2020/11/09 |
| – | SOHO-4091 | – | 1.0 | – | – | – | – | 2020/11/09 |
| – | SOHO-4092 | – | 1.0 | – | – | – | – | 2020/11/10 |
| – | SOHO-4093 | – | 1.0 | – | – | – | – | 2020/11/11 |
| – | SOHO-4094 | – | 1.0 | – | – | – | – | 2020/11/13 |
| – | SOHO-4095 | – | 1.0 | – | – | – | – | 2020/11/13 |
| – | SOHO-4096 | – | 1.0 | – | – | – | – | 2020/11/14 |
| – | SOHO-4097 | – | 1.0 | – | – | – | – | 2020/11/15 |
| – | SOHO-4098 | – | 1.0 | – | – | – | – | 2020/11/16 |
| – | SOHO-4099 | – | 1.0 | – | – | – | – | 2020/11/23 |
| – | SOHO-4100 | – | 1.0 | – | – | – | – | 2020/11/29 |
| – | SOHO-4101 | – | 1.0 | – | – | – | – | 2020/11/30 |
| – | SOHO-4102 | – | 1.0 | – | – | – | – | 2020/12/02 |
| – | SOHO-4103 | – | 1.0 | – | – | – | – | 2020/12/04 |
| – | SOHO-4104 | – | 1.0 | – | – | – | – | 2020/12/06 |
| – | SOHO-4105 | – | 1.0 | – | – | – | – | 2020/12/09 |
| – | SOHO-4107 | – | 1.0 | – | – | – | – | 2020/12/09 |
| – | SOHO-4106 | – | 1.0 | – | – | – | – | 2020/12/10 |
| C/2020 X3 | SOHO-4108 (Eclipse Comet of 2020) | – | 1.0 | – | 0.005 | 143.94 | 357.16 | 2020/12/14 |
| – | SOHO-4109 | – | 1.0 | – | – | – | – | 2020/12/18 |
| – | SOHO-4110 | – | 1.0 | – | – | – | – | 2020/12/20 |
| – | SOHO-4111 | – | 1.0 | – | – | – | – | 2020/12/20 |
| – | SOHO-4112 | – | 1.0 | – | – | – | – | 2020/12/22 |
| – | SOHO-4113 | – | 1.0 | – | – | – | – | 2020/12/23 |
| – | SOHO-4114 | – | 1.0 | – | – | – | – | 2020/12/29 |
| – | SOHO-4115 | – | 1.0 | – | – | – | – | 2020/12/31 |

=== 2021 ===
| Comet designation | Name/ discoverer(s) | Period (years) | e | a (AU) | q (AU) | i (°) | Node (°) | Perihelion date |
|---|---|---|---|---|---|---|---|---|
| – | SOHO-4116 | – | 1.0 | – | – | – | – | 2021/01/02 |
| – | SOHO-4117 | – | 1.0 | – | – | – | – | 2021/01/04 |
| – | SOHO-4119 | – | 1.0 | – | – | – | – | 2021/01/14 |
| – | SOHO-4121 | – | 1.0 | – | – | – | – | 2021/01/21 |
| – | SOHO-4123 | – | 1.0 | – | – | – | – | 2021/01/25 |
| – | SOHO-4129 | – | 1.0 | – | – | – | – | 2021/02/12 |
| – | SOHO-4130 | – | 1.0 | – | – | – | – | 2021/02/12 |
| – | SOHO-4131 | – | 1.0 | – | – | – | – | 2021/02/12 |
| – | SOHO-4133 | – | 1.0 | – | – | – | – | 2021/02/14 |
| – | SOHO-4135 | – | 1.0 | – | – | – | – | 2021/02/24 |
| – | SOHO-4136 | – | 1.0 | – | – | – | – | 2021/02/25 |
| – | SOHO-4137 | – | 1.0 | – | – | – | – | 2021/02/26 |
| – | SOHO-4138 | – | 1.0 | – | – | – | – | 2021/02/27 |
| – | SOHO-4866 | – | 1.0 | – | – | – | – | 2021/12/05 |
| – | SOHO-5078 | – | 1.0 | – | – | – | – | 2021/12/24 |

=== 2022 ===
| Comet designation | Name/ discoverer(s) | Period (years) | e | a (AU) | q (AU) | i (°) | Node (°) | Perihelion date |
|---|---|---|---|---|---|---|---|---|
| – | SOHO-5079 | – | 1.0 | – | – | – | – | 2022/04/12 |
| – | SOHO-5080 | – | 1.0 | – | – | – | – | 2022/06/21 |
| – | SOHO-4036 | – | 1.0 | – | – | – | – | 2022/06/22 |

=== 2023 ===
| Comet designation | Name/ discoverer(s) | Period (years) | e | a (AU) | q (AU) | i (°) | Node (°) | Perihelion date |
|---|---|---|---|---|---|---|---|---|
| – | SOHO-4692 | – | 1.0 | – | – | – | – | 2023/03/18 |
| – | SOHO-4689 | – | 1.0 | – | – | – | – | 2023/04/02 |
| – | SOHO-4675 | – | 1.0 | – | – | – | – | 2023/04/06 |
| – | SOHO-4676 | – | 1.0 | – | – | – | – | 2023/04/08 |
| – | SOHO-4690 | – | 1.0 | – | – | – | – | 2023/04/09 |
| – | SOHO-4677 | – | 1.0 | – | – | – | – | 2023/04/12 |
| – | SOHO-4678 | – | 1.0 | – | – | – | – | 2023/04/14 |
| – | SOHO-4679 | – | 1.0 | – | – | – | – | 2023/04/17 |
| – | SOHO-4680 | – | 1.0 | – | – | – | – | 2023/04/17 |
| – | SOHO-4681 | – | 1.0 | – | – | – | – | 2023/04/18 |
| – | SOHO-4682 | – | 1.0 | – | – | – | – | 2023/04/20 |
| – | SOHO-4683 | – | 1.0 | – | – | – | – | 2023/04/20 |
| – | SOHO-4691 | – | 1.0 | – | – | – | – | 2023/04/23 |
| – | SOHO-4684 | – | 1.0 | – | – | – | – | 2023/04/24 |
| – | SOHO-4685 | – | 1.0 | – | – | – | – | 2023/04/27 |
| – | SOHO-4686 | – | 1.0 | – | – | – | – | 2023/04/27 |
| – | SOHO-4687 | – | 1.0 | – | – | – | – | 2023/04/28 |
| – | SOHO-4688 | – | 1.0 | – | – | – | – | 2023/04/29 |
| – | SOHO-4693 | – | 1.0 | – | – | – | – | 2023/05/01 |
| – | SOHO-4694 | – | 1.0 | – | – | – | – | 2023/05/02 |
| – | SOHO-4716 | – | 1.0 | – | – | – | – | 2023/05/03 |
| – | SOHO-4695 | – | 1.0 | – | – | – | – | 2023/05/08 |
| – | SOHO-4696 | – | 1.0 | – | – | – | – | 2023/05/09 |
| – | SOHO-4697 | – | 1.0 | – | – | – | – | 2023/05/09 |
| – | SOHO-4698 | – | 1.0 | – | – | – | – | 2023/05/12 |
| – | SOHO-4699 | – | 1.0 | – | – | – | – | 2023/05/14 |
| – | SOHO-4700 | – | 1.0 | – | – | – | – | 2023/05/15 |
| – | SOHO-4701 | – | 1.0 | – | – | – | – | 2023/05/18 |
| – | SOHO-4702 | – | 1.0 | – | – | – | – | 2023/05/19 |
| – | SOHO-4703 | – | 1.0 | – | – | – | – | 2023/05/19 |
| – | SOHO-4704 | – | 1.0 | – | – | – | – | 2023/05/23 |
| – | SOHO-4705 | – | 1.0 | – | – | – | – | 2023/05/22 |
| – | SOHO-4706 | – | 1.0 | – | – | – | – | 2023/05/23 |
| – | SOHO-4707 | – | 1.0 | – | – | – | – | 2023/05/23 |
| – | SOHO-4708 | – | 1.0 | – | – | – | – | 2023/05/24 |
| – | SOHO-4709 | – | 1.0 | – | – | – | – | 2023/05/26 |
| – | SOHO-4710 | – | 1.0 | – | – | – | – | 2023/05/26 |
| – | SOHO-4711 | – | 1.0 | – | – | – | – | 2023/05/27 |
| – | SOHO-4712 | – | 1.0 | – | – | – | – | 2023/05/28 |
| – | SOHO-4713 | – | 1.0 | – | – | – | – | 2023/05/29 |
| – | SOHO-4714 | – | 1.0 | – | – | – | – | 2023/05/31 |
| – | SOHO-4731 | – | 1.0 | – | – | – | – | 2023/06/03 |
| – | SOHO-4732 | – | 1.0 | – | – | – | – | 2023/06/06 |
| – | SOHO-4733 | – | 1.0 | – | – | – | – | 2023/06/07 |
| – | SOHO-4734 | – | 1.0 | – | – | – | – | 2023/06/08 |
| – | SOHO-4735 | – | 1.0 | – | – | – | – | 2023/06/08 |
| – | SOHO-4867 | – | 1.0 | – | – | – | – | 2023/06/08 |
| – | SOHO-4737 | – | 1.0 | – | – | – | – | 2023/06/10 |
| – | SOHO-4738 | – | 1.0 | – | – | – | – | 2023/06/10 |
| – | SOHO-4739 | – | 1.0 | – | – | – | – | 2023/06/10 |
| – | SOHO-4736 | – | 1.0 | – | – | – | – | 2023/06/11 |
| – | SOHO-4740 | – | 1.0 | – | – | – | – | 2023/06/11 |
| – | SOHO-4868 | – | 1.0 | – | – | – | – | 2023/06/22 |
| – | SOHO-4741 | – | 1.0 | – | – | – | – | 2023/06/12 |
| – | SOHO-4743 | – | 1.0 | – | – | – | – | 2023/06/12 |
| – | SOHO-4744 | – | 1.0 | – | – | – | – | 2023/06/12 |
| – | SOHO-4745 | – | 1.0 | – | – | – | – | 2023/06/13 |
| – | SOHO-4747 | – | 1.0 | – | – | – | – | 2023/06/17 |
| – | SOHO-4749 | – | 1.0 | – | – | – | – | 2023/06/19 |
| – | SOHO-4750 | – | 1.0 | – | – | – | – | 2023/06/19 |
| – | SOHO-4752 | – | 1.0 | – | – | – | – | 2023/06/20 |
| – | SOHO-4753 | – | 1.0 | – | – | – | – | 2023/06/24 |
| – | SOHO-4754 | – | 1.0 | – | – | – | – | 2023/06/28 |
| – | SOHO-4755 | – | 1.0 | – | – | – | – | 2023/06/29 |
| – | SOHO-4789 | – | 1.0 | – | – | – | – | 2023/07/01 |
| – | SOHO-4790 | – | 1.0 | – | – | – | – | 2023/07/01 |
| – | SOHO-4791 | – | 1.0 | – | – | – | – | 2023/07/03 |
| – | SOHO-4792 | – | 1.0 | – | – | – | – | 2023/07/03 |
| – | SOHO-4793 | – | 1.0 | – | – | – | – | 2023/07/04 |
| – | SOHO-4794 | – | 1.0 | – | – | – | – | 2023/07/04 |
| – | SOHO-4795 | – | 1.0 | – | – | – | – | 2023/07/05 |
| – | SOHO-4796 | – | 1.0 | – | – | – | – | 2023/07/16 |
| – | SOHO-4797 | – | 1.0 | – | – | – | – | 2023/07/19 |
| – | SOHO-4798 | – | 1.0 | – | – | – | – | 2023/07/21 |
| – | SOHO-4799 | – | 1.0 | – | – | – | – | 2023/07/23 |
| – | SOHO-4880 | – | 1.0 | – | – | – | – | 2023/07/26 |
| – | SOHO-4881 | – | 1.0 | – | – | – | – | 2023/07/26 |
| – | SOHO-4801 | – | 1.0 | – | – | – | – | 2023/07/31 |
| – | SOHO-4803 | – | 1.0 | – | – | – | – | 2023/08/04 |
| – | SOHO-4807 | – | 1.0 | – | – | – | – | 2023/08/14 |
| – | SOHO-4809 | – | 1.0 | – | – | – | – | 2023/08/21 |
| – | SOHO-4810 | – | 1.0 | – | – | – | – | 2023/08/22 |
| – | SOHO-4811 | – | 1.0 | – | – | – | – | 2023/08/25 |
| – | SOHO-4869 | – | 1.0 | – | – | – | – | 2023/09/05 |
| – | SOHO-4870 | – | 1.0 | – | – | – | – | 2023/09/07 |
| – | SOHO-4872 | – | 1.0 | – | – | – | – | 2023/09/13 |
| – | SOHO-4873 | – | 1.0 | – | – | – | – | 2023/09/17 |
| – | SOHO-4874 | – | 1.0 | – | – | – | – | 2023/09/19 |
| – | SOHO-4875 | – | 1.0 | – | – | – | – | 2023/09/23 |
| – | SOHO-4876 | – | 1.0 | – | – | – | – | 2023/09/26 |
| – | SOHO-4877 | – | 1.0 | – | – | – | – | 2023/09/27 |
| – | SOHO-4878 | – | 1.0 | – | – | – | – | 2023/09/27 |
| – | SOHO-4883 | – | 1.0 | – | – | – | – | 2023/09/30 |
| – | SOHO-4884 | – | 1.0 | – | – | – | – | 2023/09/30 |
| – | SOHO-4886 | – | 1.0 | – | – | – | – | 2023/10/01 |
| – | SOHO-4887 | – | 1.0 | – | – | – | – | 2023/10/04 |
| – | SOHO-4888 | – | 1.0 | – | – | – | – | 2023/10/06 |
| – | SOHO-4890 | – | 1.0 | – | – | – | – | 2023/10/08 |
| – | SOHO-4892 | – | 1.0 | – | – | – | – | 2023/10/09 |
| – | SOHO-4891 | – | 1.0 | – | – | – | – | 2023/10/10 |
| – | SOHO-4893 | – | 1.0 | – | – | – | – | 2023/10/10 |
| – | SOHO-4894 | – | 1.0 | – | – | – | – | 2023/10/11 |
| – | SOHO-4895 | – | 1.0 | – | – | – | – | 2023/10/13 |
| – | SOHO-4896 | – | 1.0 | – | – | – | – | 2023/10/14 |
| – | SOHO-4897 | – | 1.0 | – | – | – | – | 2023/10/15 |
| – | SOHO-4898 | – | 1.0 | – | – | – | – | 2023/10/15 |
| – | SOHO-4967 | – | 1.0 | – | – | – | – | 2023/10/15 |
| – | SOHO-4899 | – | 1.0 | – | – | – | – | 2023/10/16 |
| – | SOHO-4900 | – | 1.0 | – | – | – | – | 2023/10/17 |
| – | SOHO-4902 | – | 1.0 | – | – | – | – | 2023/10/22 |
| – | SOHO-4905 | – | 1.0 | – | – | – | – | 2023/10/23 |
| – | SOHO-4906 | – | 1.0 | – | – | – | – | 2023/10/24 |
| – | SOHO-4907 | – | 1.0 | – | – | – | – | 2023/10/25 |
| – | SOHO-4908 | – | 1.0 | – | – | – | – | 2023/10/27 |
| – | SOHO-4909 | – | 1.0 | – | – | – | – | 2023/10/28 |
| – | SOHO-4910 | – | 1.0 | – | – | – | – | 2023/10/29 |
| – | SOHO-4911 | – | 1.0 | – | – | – | – | 2023/10/29 |
| – | SOHO-4912 | – | 1.0 | – | – | – | – | 2023/10/30 |
| – | SOHO-4913 | – | 1.0 | – | – | – | – | 2023/11/01 |
| – | SOHO-4914 | – | 1.0 | – | – | – | – | 2023/11/01 |
| – | SOHO-4916 | – | 1.0 | – | – | – | – | 2023/11/03 |
| – | SOHO-4917 | – | 1.0 | – | – | – | – | 2023/11/03 |
| – | SOHO-4918 | – | 1.0 | – | – | – | – | 2023/11/04 |
| – | SOHO-4920 | – | 1.0 | – | – | – | – | 2023/11/05 |
| – | SOHO-4919 | – | 1.0 | – | – | – | – | 2023/11/06 |
| – | SOHO-4921 | – | 1.0 | – | – | – | – | 2023/11/07 |
| – | SOHO-4922 | – | 1.0 | – | – | – | – | 2023/11/11 |
| – | SOHO-4923 | – | 1.0 | – | – | – | – | 2023/11/12 |
| – | SOHO-4940 | – | 1.0 | – | – | – | – | 2023/11/13 |
| – | SOHO-4924 | – | 1.0 | – | – | – | – | 2023/11/17 |
| – | SOHO-4925 | – | 1.0 | – | – | – | – | 2023/11/17 |
| – | SOHO-4927 | – | 1.0 | – | – | – | – | 2023/11/19 |
| – | SOHO-4928 | – | 1.0 | – | – | – | – | 2023/11/20 |
| – | SOHO-4929 | – | 1.0 | – | – | – | – | 2023/11/21 |
| – | SOHO-4930 | – | 1.0 | – | – | – | – | 2023/11/22 |
| – | SOHO-4931 | – | 1.0 | – | – | – | – | 2023/11/23 |
| – | SOHO-4932 | – | 1.0 | – | – | – | – | 2023/11/23 |
| – | SOHO-4933 | – | 1.0 | – | – | – | – | 2023/11/23 |
| – | SOHO-4934 | – | 1.0 | – | – | – | – | 2023/11/23 |
| – | SOHO-4935 | – | 1.0 | – | – | – | – | 2023/11/25 |
| – | SOHO-4936 | – | 1.0 | – | – | – | – | 2023/11/26 |
| – | SOHO-4937 | – | 1.0 | – | – | – | – | 2023/11/29 |
| – | SOHO-4938 | – | 1.0 | – | – | – | – | 2023/11/30 |
| – | SOHO-4939 | – | 1.0 | – | – | – | – | 2023/11/30 |
| – | SOHO-4941 | – | 1.0 | – | – | – | – | 2023/12/02 |
| – | SOHO-4942 | – | 1.0 | – | – | – | – | 2023/12/02 |
| – | SOHO-4943 | – | 1.0 | – | – | – | – | 2023/12/03 |
| – | SOHO-4944 | – | 1.0 | – | – | – | – | 2023/12/03 |
| – | SOHO-4945 | – | 1.0 | – | – | – | – | 2023/12/03 |
| – | SOHO-4946 | – | 1.0 | – | – | – | – | 2023/12/07 |
| – | SOHO-4947 | – | 1.0 | – | – | – | – | 2023/12/09 |
| – | SOHO-4950 | – | 1.0 | – | – | – | – | 2023/12/10 |
| – | SOHO-4951 | – | 1.0 | – | – | – | – | 2023/12/11 |
| – | SOHO-4952 | – | 1.0 | – | – | – | – | 2023/12/11 |
| – | SOHO-4953 | – | 1.0 | – | – | – | – | 2023/12/11 |
| – | SOHO-4949 | – | 1.0 | – | – | – | – | 2023/12/12 |
| – | SOHO-4954 | – | 1.0 | – | – | – | – | 2023/12/12 |
| – | SOHO-4955 | – | 1.0 | – | – | – | – | 2023/12/15 |
| – | SOHO-4956 | – | 1.0 | – | – | – | – | 2023/12/16 |
| – | SOHO-4957 | – | 1.0 | – | – | – | – | 2023/12/17 |
| – | SOHO-4958 | – | 1.0 | – | – | – | – | 2023/12/17 |
| – | SOHO-4959 | – | 1.0 | – | – | – | – | 2023/12/18 |
| – | SOHO-4961 | – | 1.0 | – | – | – | – | 2023/12/24 |
| – | SOHO-4962 | – | 1.0 | – | – | – | – | 2023/12/24 |
| – | SOHO-4963 | – | 1.0 | – | – | – | – | 2023/12/25 |
| – | SOHO-4965 | – | 1.0 | – | – | – | – | 2023/12/26 |
| – | SOHO-4964 | – | 1.0 | – | – | – | – | 2023/12/27 |
| – | SOHO-4966 | – | 1.0 | – | – | – | – | 2023/12/30 |

=== 2024 ===
| Comet designation | Name/ discoverer(s) | Period (years) | e | a (AU) | q (AU) | i (°) | Node (°) | Perihelion date |
|---|---|---|---|---|---|---|---|---|
| – | SOHO-4968 | – | 1.0 | – | – | – | – | 2024/01/02 |
| – | SOHO-4969 | – | 1.0 | – | – | – | – | 2024/01/02 |
| – | SOHO-4970 | – | 1.0 | – | – | – | – | 2024/01/06 |
| – | SOHO-4971 | – | 1.0 | – | – | – | – | 2024/01/07 |
| – | SOHO-4972 | – | 1.0 | – | – | – | – | 2024/01/13 |
| – | SOHO-4973 | – | 1.0 | – | – | – | – | 2024/01/16 |
| – | SOHO-4974 | – | 1.0 | – | – | – | – | 2024/01/24 |
| – | SOHO-4975 | – | 1.0 | – | – | – | – | 2024/01/25 |
| – | SOHO-4977 | – | 1.0 | – | – | – | – | 2024/01/31 |
| – | SOHO-4978 | – | 1.0 | – | – | – | – | 2024/02/01 |
| – | SOHO-4979 | – | 1.0 | – | – | – | – | 2024/02/03 |
| – | SOHO-4980 | – | 1.0 | – | – | – | – | 2024/02/03 |
| – | SOHO-4981 | – | 1.0 | – | – | – | – | 2024/02/04 |
| – | SOHO-4982 | – | 1.0 | – | – | – | – | 2024/02/08 |
| – | SOHO-4983 | – | 1.0 | – | – | – | – | 2024/02/08 |
| – | SOHO-4984 | – | 1.0 | – | – | – | – | 2024/02/11 |
| – | SOHO-4985 | – | 1.0 | – | – | – | – | 2024/02/14 |
| – | SOHO-4987 | – | 1.0 | – | – | – | – | 2024/02/16 |
| – | SOHO-4988 | – | 1.0 | – | – | – | – | 2024/02/19 |
| – | SOHO-4990 | – | 1.0 | – | – | – | – | 2024/02/26 |
| – | SOHO-4991 | – | 1.0 | – | – | – | – | 2024/03/02 |
| – | SOHO-4992 | – | 1.0 | – | – | – | – | 2024/03/02 |
| – | SOHO-4993 | – | 1.0 | – | – | – | – | 2024/03/07 |
| – | SOHO-4994 | – | 1.0 | – | – | – | – | 2024/03/12 |
| – | SOHO-4995 | – | 1.0 | – | – | – | – | 2024/03/14 |
| – | SOHO-4996 | – | 1.0 | – | – | – | – | 2024/03/14 |
| – | SOHO-4997 | – | 1.0 | – | – | – | – | 2024/03/21 |
| – | SOHO-5001 | – | 1.0 | – | – | – | – | 2024/03/26 |
| – | SOHO-5002 | – | 1.0 | – | – | – | – | 2024/03/26 |
| – | SOHO-5004 | – | 1.0 | – | – | – | – | 2024/03/28 |
| – | SOHO-5005 | – | 1.0 | – | – | – | – | 2024/03/30 |
| – | SOHO-5006 | – | 1.0 | – | – | – | – | 2024/04/01 |
| – | SOHO-5007 | – | 1.0 | – | – | – | – | 2024/04/03 |
| – | SOHO-5008 | – | 1.0 | – | – | – | – | 2024/04/08 |
| – | SOHO-5009 | – | 1.0 | – | – | – | – | 2024/04/13 |
| – | SOHO-5010 | – | 1.0 | – | – | – | – | 2024/04/24 |
| – | SOHO-5011 | – | 1.0 | – | – | – | – | 2024/04/30 |
| – | SOHO-5012 | – | 1.0 | – | – | – | – | 2024/05/02 |
| – | SOHO-5013 | – | 1.0 | – | – | – | – | 2024/05/05 |
| – | SOHO-5014 | – | 1.0 | – | – | – | – | 2024/05/06 |
| – | SOHO-5015 | – | 1.0 | – | – | – | – | 2024/05/06 |
| – | SOHO-5016 | – | 1.0 | – | – | – | – | 2024/05/10 |
| – | SOHO-5017 | – | 1.0 | – | – | – | – | 2024/05/11 |
| – | SOHO-5018 | – | 1.0 | – | – | – | – | 2024/05/14 |
| – | SOHO-5019 | – | 1.0 | – | – | – | – | 2024/05/17 |
| – | SOHO-5020 | – | 1.0 | – | – | – | – | 2024/05/18 |
| – | SOHO-5021 | – | 1.0 | – | – | – | – | 2024/05/20 |
| – | SOHO-5022 | – | 1.0 | – | – | – | – | 2024/05/21 |
| – | SOHO-5024 | – | 1.0 | – | – | – | – | 2024/05/23 |
| – | SOHO-5025 | – | 1.0 | – | – | – | – | 2024/05/24 |
| – | SOHO-5026 | – | 1.0 | – | – | – | – | 2024/05/26 |
| – | SOHO-5027 | – | 1.0 | – | – | – | – | 2024/05/26 |
| – | SOHO-5028 | – | 1.0 | – | – | – | – | 2024/05/27 |
| – | SOHO-5029 | – | 1.0 | – | – | – | – | 2024/05/29 |
| – | SOHO-5030 | – | 1.0 | – | – | – | – | 2024/05/29 |
| – | SOHO-5031 | – | 1.0 | – | – | – | – | 2024/05/29 |
| – | SOHO-5032 | – | 1.0 | – | – | – | – | 2024/05/30 |
| – | SOHO-5033 | – | 1.0 | – | – | – | – | 2024/05/31 |
| – | SOHO-5034 | – | 1.0 | – | – | – | – | 2024/06/01 |
| – | SOHO-5035 | – | 1.0 | – | – | – | – | 2024/06/02 |
| – | SOHO-5037 | – | 1.0 | – | – | – | – | 2024/06/06 |
| – | SOHO-5038 | – | 1.0 | – | – | – | – | 2024/06/09 |
| – | SOHO-5039 | – | 1.0 | – | – | – | – | 2024/06/11 |
| – | SOHO-5040 | – | 1.0 | – | – | – | – | 2024/06/12 |
| – | SOHO-5041 | – | 1.0 | – | – | – | – | 2024/06/13 |
| – | SOHO-5042 | – | 1.0 | – | – | – | – | 2024/06/13 |
| – | SOHO-5043 | – | 1.0 | – | – | – | – | 2024/06/14 |
| – | SOHO-5044 | – | 1.0 | – | – | – | – | 2024/06/14 |
| – | SOHO-5045 | – | 1.0 | – | – | – | – | 2024/06/15 |
| – | SOHO-5046 | – | 1.0 | – | – | – | – | 2024/06/15 |
| – | SOHO-5047 | – | 1.0 | – | – | – | – | 2024/06/16 |
| – | SOHO-5048 | – | 1.0 | – | – | – | – | 2024/06/19 |
| – | SOHO-5049 | – | 1.0 | – | – | – | – | 2024/06/21 |
| – | SOHO-5050 | – | 1.0 | – | – | – | – | 2024/06/22 |
| – | SOHO-5051 | – | 1.0 | – | – | – | – | 2024/06/24 |
| – | SOHO-5052 | – | 1.0 | – | – | – | – | 2024/06/24 |
| – | SOHO-5053 | – | 1.0 | – | – | – | – | 2024/06/29 |
| – | SOHO-5054 | – | 1.0 | – | – | – | – | 2024/06/30 |
| – | SOHO-5055 | – | 1.0 | – | – | – | – | 2024/06/30 |
| – | SOHO-5056 | – | 1.0 | – | – | – | – | 2024/07/01 |
| – | SOHO-5057 | – | 1.0 | – | – | – | – | 2024/07/08 |
| – | SOHO-5059 | – | 1.0 | – | – | – | – | 2024/07/11 |
| – | SOHO-5060 | – | 1.0 | – | – | – | – | 2024/07/12 |
| – | SOHO-5062 | – | 1.0 | – | – | – | – | 2024/07/17 |
| – | SOHO-5063 | – | 1.0 | – | – | – | – | 2024/07/17 |
| – | SOHO-5065 | – | 1.0 | – | – | – | – | 2024/07/25 |
| – | SOHO-5081 | – | 1.0 | – | – | – | – | 2024/08/01 |
| – | SOHO-5082 | – | 1.0 | – | – | – | – | 2024/08/01 |
| – | SOHO-5083 | – | 1.0 | – | – | – | – | 2024/08/05 |
| – | SOHO-5084 | – | 1.0 | – | – | – | – | 2024/08/07 |
| – | SOHO-5086 | – | 1.0 | – | – | – | – | 2024/08/10 |
| – | SOHO-5087 | – | 1.0 | – | – | – | – | 2024/08/11 |
| – | SOHO-5088 | – | 1.0 | – | – | – | – | 2024/08/19 |
| – | SOHO-5089 | – | 1.0 | – | – | – | – | 2024/08/21 |
| – | SOHO-5090 | – | 1.0 | – | – | – | – | 2024/08/25 |
| – | SOHO-5091 | – | 1.0 | – | – | – | – | 2024/08/27 |
| – | SOHO-5092 | – | 1.0 | – | – | – | – | 2024/08/28 |
| – | SOHO-5094 | – | 1.0 | – | – | – | – | 2024/08/31 |
| – | SOHO-5095 | – | 1.0 | – | – | – | – | 2024/08/31 |
| – | SOHO-5096 | – | 1.0 | – | – | – | – | 2024/08/31 |
| – | SOHO-5097 | – | 1.0 | – | – | – | – | 2024/09/01 |
| – | SOHO-5098 | – | 1.0 | – | – | – | – | 2024/09/02 |
| – | SOHO-5099 | – | 1.0 | – | – | – | – | 2024/09/04 |
| – | SOHO-5100 | – | 1.0 | – | – | – | – | 2024/09/08 |
| – | SOHO-5101 | – | 1.0 | – | – | – | – | 2024/09/09 |
| – | SOHO-5102 | – | 1.0 | – | – | – | – | 2024/09/10 |
| – | SOHO-5103 | – | 1.0 | – | – | – | – | 2024/09/15 |
| – | SOHO-5104 | – | 1.0 | – | – | – | – | 2024/09/15 |
| – | SOHO-5106 | – | 1.0 | – | – | – | – | 2024/09/16 |
| – | SOHO-5108 | – | 1.0 | – | – | – | – | 2024/09/27 |
| – | SOHO-5110 | – | 1.0 | – | – | – | – | 2024/10/06 |
| – | SOHO-5111 | – | 1.0 | – | – | – | – | 2024/10/06 |
| – | SOHO-5112 | – | 1.0 | – | – | – | – | 2024/10/08 |
| – | SOHO-5113 | – | 1.0 | – | – | – | – | 2024/10/11 |
| – | SOHO-5114 | – | 1.0 | – | – | – | – | 2024/10/12 |
| – | SOHO-5115 | – | 1.0 | – | – | – | – | 2024/10/14 |
| – | SOHO-5116 | – | 1.0 | – | – | – | – | 2024/10/17 |
| – | SOHO-5117 | – | 1.0 | – | – | – | – | 2024/10/18 |
| – | SOHO-5118 | – | 1.0 | – | – | – | – | 2024/10/19 |
| – | SOHO-5119 | – | 1.0 | – | – | – | – | 2024/10/23 |
| C/2024 S1-B | ATLAS (SOHO-5121) | – | 1.0 | – | – | – | – | 2024/10/27 |
| – | SOHO-5122 | – | 1.0 | – | – | – | – | 2024/10/28 |
| C/2024 S1 | ATLAS | 953 | 0.9999 | 96.86 | 0.008 | 142 | 347 | 2024/10/28 |
| – | SOHO-5123 | – | 1.0 | – | – | – | – | 2024/10/28 |
| – | SOHO-5124 | – | 1.0 | – | – | – | – | 2024/10/31 |
| – | SOHO-5127 | – | 1.0 | – | – | – | – | 2024/11/06 |
| – | SOHO-5128 | – | 1.0 | – | – | – | – | 2024/11/06 |
| – | SOHO-5129 | – | 1.0 | – | – | – | – | 2024/11/09 |
| – | SOHO-5130 | – | 1.0 | – | – | – | – | 2024/11/09 |
| – | SOHO-5131 | – | 1.0 | – | – | – | – | 2024/11/10 |
| – | SOHO-5132 | – | 1.0 | – | – | – | – | 2024/11/10 |
| – | SOHO-5133 | – | 1.0 | – | – | – | – | 2024/11/12 |
| – | SOHO-5134 | – | 1.0 | – | – | – | – | 2024/11/15 |
| – | SOHO-5135 | – | 1.0 | – | – | – | – | 2024/11/17 |
| – | SOHO-5136 | – | 1.0 | – | – | – | – | 2024/11/21 |
| – | SOHO-5137 | – | 1.0 | – | – | – | – | 2024/11/22 |
| – | SOHO-5138 | – | 1.0 | – | – | – | – | 2024/11/22 |
| – | SOHO-5139 | – | 1.0 | – | – | – | – | 2024/11/22 |
| – | SOHO-5140 | – | 1.0 | – | – | – | – | 2024/11/24 |
| – | SOHO-5141 | – | 1.0 | – | – | – | – | 2024/11/25 |
| – | SOHO-5142 | – | 1.0 | – | – | – | – | 2024/11/25 |
| – | SOHO-5144 | – | 1.0 | – | – | – | – | 2024/11/26 |
| – | SOHO-5145 | – | 1.0 | – | – | – | – | 2024/11/29 |
| – | SOHO-5146 | – | 1.0 | – | – | – | – | 2024/11/30 |
| – | SOHO-5147 | – | 1.0 | – | – | – | – | 2024/11/30 |
| – | SOHO-5148 | – | 1.0 | – | – | – | – | 2024/12/01 |
| – | SOHO-5149 | – | 1.0 | – | – | – | – | 2024/12/01 |
| – | SOHO-5150 | – | 1.0 | – | – | – | – | 2024/12/01 |
| – | SOHO-5151 | – | 1.0 | – | – | – | – | 2024/12/01 |
| – | SOHO-5152 | – | 1.0 | – | – | – | – | 2024/12/02 |
| – | SOHO-5153 | – | 1.0 | – | – | – | – | 2024/12/02 |
| – | SOHO-5154 | – | 1.0 | – | – | – | – | 2024/12/02 |
| – | SOHO-5155 | – | 1.0 | – | – | – | – | 2024/12/03 |
| – | SOHO-5156 | – | 1.0 | – | – | – | – | 2024/12/03 |
| – | SOHO-5157 | – | 1.0 | – | – | – | – | 2024/12/03 |
| – | SOHO-5158 | – | 1.0 | – | – | – | – | 2024/12/06 |
| – | SOHO-5159 | – | 1.0 | – | – | – | – | 2024/12/06 |
| – | SOHO-4866 | – | 1.0 | – | – | – | – | 2024/12/08 |
| – | SOHO-5160 | – | 1.0 | – | – | – | – | 2024/12/08 |
| – | SOHO-5161 | – | 1.0 | – | – | – | – | 2024/12/12 |
| – | SOHO-5162 | – | 1.0 | – | – | – | – | 2024/12/18 |
| – | SOHO-5163 | – | 1.0 | – | – | – | – | 2024/12/21 |
| – | SOHO-5164 | – | 1.0 | – | – | – | – | 2024/12/24 |
| – | SOHO-5165 | – | 1.0 | – | – | – | – | 2024/12/25 |
| – | SOHO-5166 | – | 1.0 | – | – | – | – | 2024/12/29 |
| – | SOHO-5167 | – | 1.0 | – | – | – | – | 2024/12/30 |
| – | SOHO-5168 | – | 1.0 | – | – | – | – | 2024/12/31 |

=== 2025 ===
Since February 2025, new members of the Kreutz family are also being discovered through the Compact Coronagraph (CCOR) instrument aboard the GOES-19 satellite.

| Comet designation | Name/ discoverer(s) | Period (years) | e | a (AU) | q (AU) | i (°) | Node (°) | Perihelion date |
|---|---|---|---|---|---|---|---|---|
| – | SOHO-5169 | – | 1.0 | – | – | – | – | 2025/01/01 |
| – | SOHO-5170 | – | 1.0 | – | – | – | – | 2025/01/03 |
| – | SOHO-5171 | – | 1.0 | – | – | – | – | 2025/01/13 |
| – | SOHO-5172 | – | 1.0 | – | – | – | – | 2025/01/15 |
| – | SOHO-5173 | – | 1.0 | – | – | – | – | 2025/01/21 |
| – | SOHO-5174 | – | 1.0 | – | – | – | – | 2025/01/22 |
| – | SOHO-5176 | – | 1.0 | – | – | – | – | 2025/01/27 |
| – | SOHO-5177 | – | 1.0 | – | – | – | – | 2025/02/02 |
| – | CCOR1-10 | – | 1.0 | – | – | – | – | 2025/02/06 |
| – | SOHO-5178 | – | 1.0 | – | – | – | – | 2025/02/07 |
| – | SOHO-5179 | – | 1.0 | – | – | – | – | 2025/02/07 |
| – | SOHO-5180 | – | 1.0 | – | – | – | – | 2025/02/09 |
| – | SOHO-5181 | – | 1.0 | – | – | – | – | 2025/02/10 |
| – | CCOR1-1 | – | 1.0 | – | – | – | – | 2025/02/11 |
| – | CCOR1-2 | – | 1.0 | – | – | – | – | 2025/02/11 |
| – | CCOR1-3 | – | 1.0 | – | – | – | – | 2025/02/11 |
| – | SOHO-5182 | – | 1.0 | – | – | – | – | 2025/02/14 |
| – | SOHO-5183 | – | 1.0 | – | – | – | – | 2025/02/15 |
| – | CCOR1-4 | – | 1.0 | – | – | – | – | 2025/02/16 |
| – | CCOR1-5 | – | 1.0 | – | – | – | – | 2025/02/19 |
| – | CCOR1-6 | – | 1.0 | – | – | – | – | 2025/02/23 |
| – | CCOR1-7 | – | 1.0 | – | – | – | – | 2025/02/24 |
| – | CCOR1-8 | – | 1.0 | – | – | – | – | 2025/02/25 |
| – | CCOR1-9 | – | 1.0 | – | – | – | – | 2025/02/25 |
| – | CCOR1-11 | – | 1.0 | – | – | – | – | 2025/02/27 |
| – | SOHO-5185 | – | 1.0 | – | – | – | – | 2025/02/27 |
| – | CCOR1-12 | – | 1.0 | – | – | – | – | 2025/03/03 |
| – | CCOR1-13 | – | 1.0 | – | – | – | – | 2025/03/05 |
| – | CCOR1-14 | – | 1.0 | – | – | – | – | 2025/03/06 |
| – | CCOR1-15 | – | 1.0 | – | – | – | – | 2025/03/07 |
| – | CCOR1-16 | – | 1.0 | – | – | – | – | 2025/03/08 |
| – | CCOR1-17 | – | 1.0 | – | – | – | – | 2025/03/12 |
| – | CCOR1-18 | – | 1.0 | – | – | – | – | 2025/03/12 |
| – | CCOR1-19 | – | 1.0 | – | – | – | – | 2025/03/13 |
| – | CCOR1-20 | – | 1.0 | – | – | – | – | 2025/03/13 |
| – | CCOR1-21 | – | 1.0 | – | – | – | – | 2025/03/16 |
| – | CCOR1-22 | – | 1.0 | – | – | – | – | 2025/03/17 |
| – | CCOR1-23 | – | 1.0 | – | – | – | – | 2025/03/17 |
| – | CCOR1-24 | – | 1.0 | – | – | – | – | 2025/03/17 |
| – | CCOR1-25 | – | 1.0 | – | – | – | – | 2025/03/17 |
| – | CCOR1-26 | – | 1.0 | – | – | – | – | 2025/03/19 |
| – | CCOR1-27 | – | 1.0 | – | – | – | – | 2025/03/20 |
| – | SOHO-5186 | – | 1.0 | – | – | – | – | 2025/03/25 |
| – | SOHO-5188 | – | 1.0 | – | – | – | – | 2025/03/27 |
| – | SOHO-5187 | – | 1.0 | – | – | – | – | 2025/03/28 |
| – | SOHO-5189 | – | 1.0 | – | – | – | – | 2025/03/31 |
| – | CCOR1-28 | – | 1.0 | – | – | – | – | 2025/04/01 |
| – | SOHO-5190 | – | 1.0 | – | – | – | – | 2025/04/01 |
| – | CCOR1-29 | – | 1.0 | – | – | – | – | 2025/04/06 |
| – | CCOR1-30 | – | 1.0 | – | – | – | – | 2025/04/06 |
| – | CCOR1-31 | – | 1.0 | – | – | – | – | 2025/04/08 |
| – | SOHO-5192 | – | 1.0 | – | – | – | – | 2025/04/10 |
| – | CCOR1-32 | – | 1.0 | – | – | – | – | 2025/04/11 |
| – | CCOR1-33 | – | 1.0 | – | – | – | – | 2025/04/13 |
| – | CCOR1-34 | – | 1.0 | – | – | – | – | 2025/04/15 |
| – | CCOR1-36 | – | 1.0 | – | – | – | – | 2025/04/16 |
| – | CCOR1-37 | – | 1.0 | – | – | – | – | 2025/04/25 |
| – | CCOR1-38 | – | 1.0 | – | – | – | – | 2025/04/26 |
| – | CCOR1-39 | – | 1.0 | – | – | – | – | 2025/04/27 |
| – | CCOR1-40 | – | 1.0 | – | – | – | – | 2025/04/27 |
| – | CCOR1-41 | – | 1.0 | – | – | – | – | 2025/05/02 |
| – | CCOR1-42 | – | 1.0 | – | – | – | – | 2025/05/06 |
| – | SOHO-5193 | – | 1.0 | – | – | – | – | 2025/05/09 |
| – | SOHO-5194 | – | 1.0 | – | – | – | – | 2025/05/09 |
| – | SOHO-5195 | – | 1.0 | – | – | – | – | 2025/05/09 |
| – | CCOR1-43 | – | 1.0 | – | – | – | – | 2025/05/13 |
| – | CCOR1-44 | – | 1.0 | – | – | – | – | 2025/05/15 |
| – | SOHO-5196 | – | 1.0 | – | – | – | – | 2025/05/15 |
| – | CCOR1-45 | – | 1.0 | – | – | – | – | 2025/05/21 |
| – | SOHO-5197 | – | 1.0 | – | – | – | – | 2025/05/21 |
| – | CCOR1-46 | – | 1.0 | – | – | – | – | 2025/05/22 |
| – | SOHO-5198 | – | 1.0 | – | – | – | – | 2025/05/23 |
| – | SOHO-5199 | – | 1.0 | – | – | – | – | 2025/05/24 |
| – | SOHO-5200 | – | 1.0 | – | – | – | – | 2025/05/25 |
| – | SOHO-5201 | – | 1.0 | – | – | – | – | 2025/05/27 |
| – | CCOR1-47 | – | 1.0 | – | – | – | – | 2025/05/28 |
| – | SOHO-5203 | – | 1.0 | – | – | – | – | 2025/05/31 |
| – | SOHO-5204 | – | 1.0 | – | – | – | – | 2025/05/31 |
| – | SOHO-5205 | – | 1.0 | – | – | – | – | 2025/06/01 |
| – | SOHO-5206 | – | 1.0 | – | – | – | – | 2025/06/04 |
| – | SOHO-5208 | – | 1.0 | – | – | – | – | 2025/06/12 |
| – | SOHO-5209 | – | 1.0 | – | – | – | – | 2025/06/15 |
| – | CCOR1-48 | – | 1.0 | – | – | – | – | 2025/06/16 |
| – | CCOR1-49 | – | 1.0 | – | – | – | – | 2025/06/16 |
| – | SOHO-5210 | – | 1.0 | – | – | – | – | 2025/06/16 |
| – | SOHO-5211 | – | 1.0 | – | – | – | – | 2025/06/16 |
| – | CCOR1-50 | – | 1.0 | – | – | – | – | 2025/06/17 |
| – | SOHO-5212 | – | 1.0 | – | – | – | – | 2025/06/17 |
| – | SOHO-5213 | – | 1.0 | – | – | – | – | 2025/06/18 |
| – | CCOR1-52 | – | 1.0 | – | – | – | – | 2025/06/22 |
| – | SOHO-5214 | – | 1.0 | – | – | – | – | 2025/06/22 |
| – | CCOR1-53 | – | 1.0 | – | – | – | – | 2025/06/23 |
| – | CCOR1-54 | – | 1.0 | – | – | – | – | 2025/06/23 |
| – | CCOR1-55 | – | 1.0 | – | – | – | – | 2025/06/23 |
| – | CCOR1-56 | – | 1.0 | – | – | – | – | 2025/06/26 |
| – | CCOR1-57 | – | 1.0 | – | – | – | – | 2025/06/27 |
| – | CCOR1-58 | – | 1.0 | – | – | – | – | 2025/06/30 |
| – | CCOR1-59 | – | 1.0 | – | – | – | – | 2025/07/01 |
| – | CCOR1-60 | – | 1.0 | – | – | – | – | 2025/07/01 |
| – | CCOR1-62 | – | 1.0 | – | – | – | – | 2025/07/03 |
| – | CCOR1-63 | – | 1.0 | – | – | – | – | 2025/07/03 |
| – | CCOR1-64 | – | 1.0 | – | – | – | – | 2025/07/03 |
| – | CCOR1-61 | – | 1.0 | – | – | – | – | 2025/07/04 |
| – | CCOR1-65 | – | 1.0 | – | – | – | – | 2025/07/08 |
| – | CCOR1-66 | – | 1.0 | – | – | – | – | 2025/07/08 |
| – | CCOR1-67 | – | 1.0 | – | – | – | – | 2025/07/09 |
| – | CCOR1-68 | – | 1.0 | – | – | – | – | 2025/07/11 |
| – | CCOR1-69 | – | 1.0 | – | – | – | – | 2025/07/12 |
| – | CCOR1-71 | – | 1.0 | – | – | – | – | 2025/07/13 |
| – | CCOR1-72 | – | 1.0 | – | – | – | – | 2025/07/16 |
| – | CCOR1-73 | – | 1.0 | – | – | – | – | 2025/07/17 |
| – | CCOR1-74 | – | 1.0 | – | – | – | – | 2025/07/17 |
| – | CCOR1-75 | – | 1.0 | – | – | – | – | 2025/07/19 |
| – | CCOR1-76 | – | 1.0 | – | – | – | – | 2025/07/20 |
| – | CCOR1-77 | – | 1.0 | – | – | – | – | 2025/07/22 |
| – | CCOR1-78 | – | 1.0 | – | – | – | – | 2025/07/23 |
| – | SOHO-5217 | – | 1.0 | – | – | – | – | 2025/07/23 |
| – | CCOR1-79 | – | 1.0 | – | – | – | – | 2025/07/24 |
| – | CCOR1-80 | – | 1.0 | – | – | – | – | 2025/07/25 |
| – | CCOR1-81 | – | 1.0 | – | – | – | – | 2025/07/25 |
| – | CCOR1-82 | – | 1.0 | – | – | – | – | 2025/07/27 |
| – | CCOR1-83 | – | 1.0 | – | – | – | – | 2025/07/27 |
| – | CCOR1-84 | – | 1.0 | – | – | – | – | 2025/07/28 |
| – | CCOR1-85 | – | 1.0 | – | – | – | – | 2025/07/29 |
| – | CCOR1-86 | – | 1.0 | – | – | – | – | 2025/08/01 |
| – | CCOR1-87 | – | 1.0 | – | – | – | – | 2025/08/02 |
| – | CCOR1-88 | – | 1.0 | – | – | – | – | 2025/08/06 |
| – | CCOR1-89 | – | 1.0 | – | – | – | – | 2025/08/13 |
| – | CCOR1-91 | – | 1.0 | – | – | – | – | 2025/08/18 |
| – | CCOR1-92 | – | 1.0 | – | – | – | – | 2025/08/19 |
| – | CCOR1-93 | – | 1.0 | – | – | – | – | 2025/08/20 |
| – | CCOR1-96 | – | 1.0 | – | – | – | – | 2025/08/24 |
| – | CCOR1-97 | – | 1.0 | – | – | – | – | 2025/08/25 |
| – | CCOR1-100 | – | 1.0 | – | – | – | – | 2025/08/30 |

=== 2026 ===
| Comet designation | Name/ discoverer(s) | Period (years) | e | a (AU) | q (AU) | i (° | Node (°) | Perihelion date |
|---|---|---|---|---|---|---|---|---|
| C/2026 A1 | MAPS | 1769 | 0.999963 | 146.3 | 0.0057 | 144.38 | 3.4 | 2026/04/04 |

== See also ==
- List of comets by type
  - List of parabolic and hyperbolic comets
  - List of near-parabolic comets
  - List of long-period comets
  - List of Halley-type comets
  - List of periodic comets
  - List of numbered comets
  - List of comets with no meaningful orbit
