= C/2026 A1 (MAPS) =

Kreutz sungrazer comet

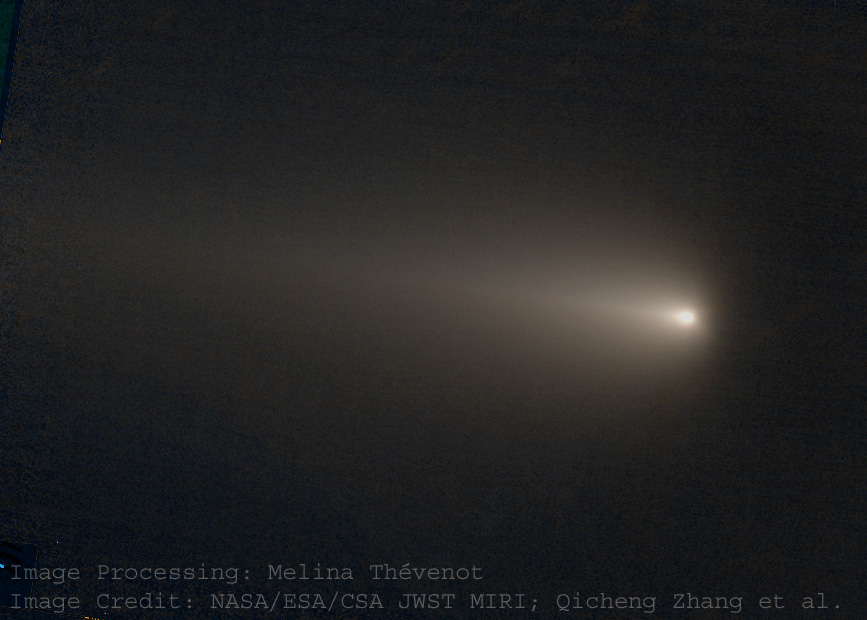
- Comet MAPS as seen by the James Webb Space Telescope on 7 February 2026

Discovery
- Discovered by: MAP Observation Program: Alain Maury; Georges Attard; Daniel Parrott; Florian Signoret
- Discovery site: AMACS1, Chile (W94)
- Discovery date: 13 January 2026

Designations
- Alternative designations: 6AC4721, CK26A010

Orbital characteristics
- Epoch: 12 February 2026 (JD 2461083.5)
- Observation arc: 74 days (Note: Including the earliest precovery date for this comet, the total observation arc would be 107 days in length)
- Earliest precovery date: 18 December 2025
- Number of observations: 1,019
- Orbit type: Kreutz sungrazer
- Aphelion: 307±1 AU
- Perihelion: 0.005729 AU (1.232 R_{☉}) (Note: The comet passed 0.005729 AU (1.232 R_{☉}) from the center of the Sun which is (0.232 solar radii * 695700 km) = 161,000 km (100,000 mi) from the surface of the Sun.)
- Semi-major axis: 153±1 AU
- Eccentricity: 0.99996
- Orbital period: 1900±8 years (near perihelion); 1741 years (Nakano); 1695 years (inbound)
- Max. orbital speed: 557 km/s
- Inclination: 144.49°
- Longitude of ascending node: 7.87°
- Argument of periapsis: 86.3°
- Mean anomaly: 359.97°
- Last perihelion: 4 April 2026 ≈14:22 UT
- T_{Jupiter}: –0.043
- Earth MOID: 0.556 AU
- Jupiter MOID: 2.987 AU

Physical characteristics
- Mean radius: 0.2 km (0.12 mi)
- Comet total magnitude (M1): 14.8±1
- Apparent magnitude: –0.6 (peak) (4 April 2026)

C/2026 A1 (MAPS), formerly known by its temporary designation as 6AC4721, was a Kreutz sungrazer comet discovered on 13 January 2026 from the AMACS1 Observatory in the Atacama Desert. This comet was discovered through the MAPS program, which was led by Alain Maury, Georges Attard, Daniel Parrott and Florian Signoret. (Note: C/2026 A1 is the third comet discovered by the program. Others include C/2025 L2 (MAPS), C/2025 O2 (MAPS), and C/2026 V2 (MAPS).) On 4 April 2026, it passed about 161,000 km (100,000 mi) from the surface of the Sun. When near the Sun, the forward scattering of light would have made the comet significantly brighter, but hard to see against the glare of the Sun. (Note: Observing a comet when it is very close to the Sun can be dangerous.) At 4 April 08:15 UT, ~6 hours before perihelion, CCOR-1 showed the comet's head to be about apparent magnitude –0.6, shortly after which it disintegrated.

== Observational history ==
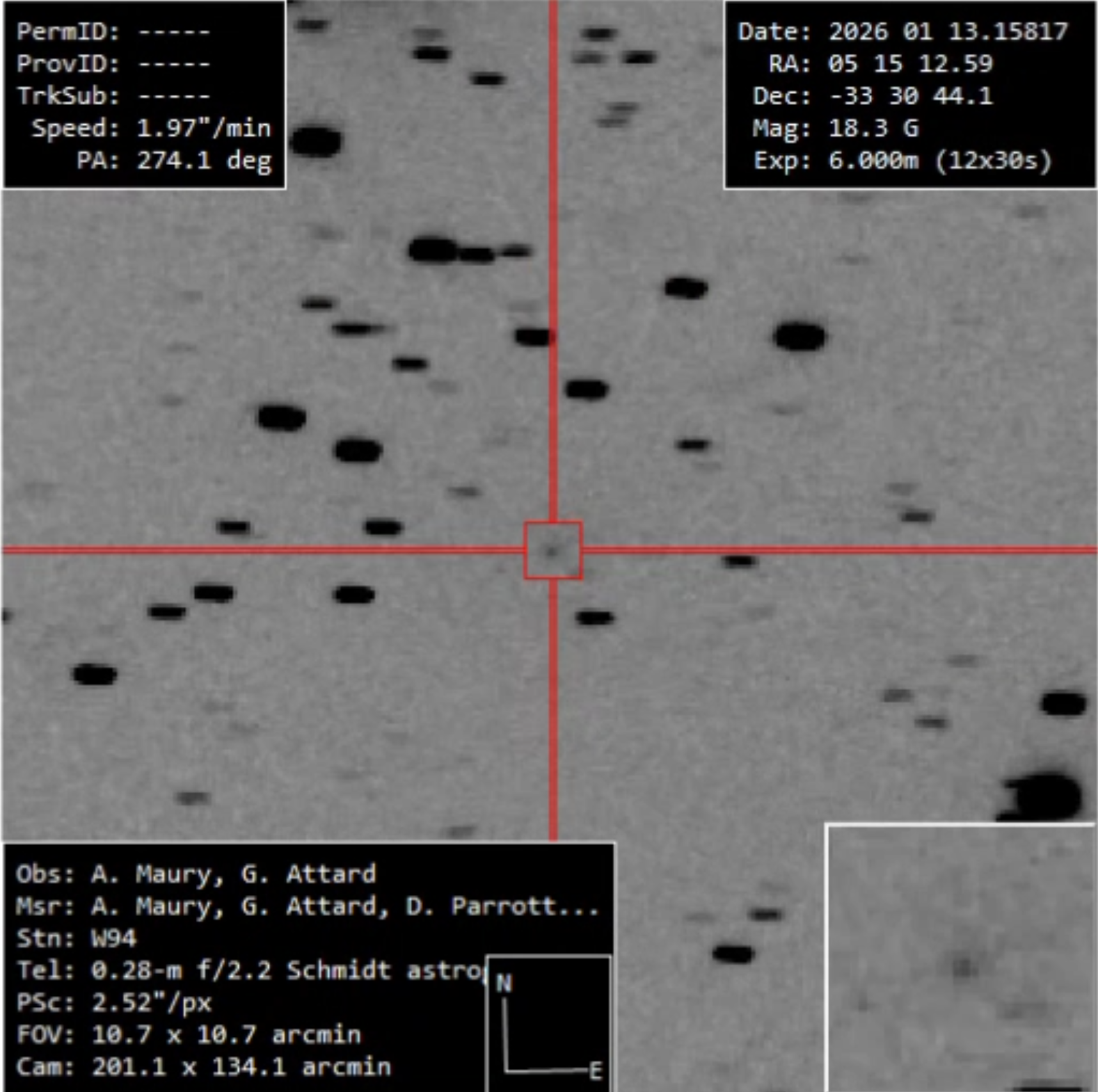
C/2026 A1 imaged by Alain Maury and Georges Attard on 17 January 2026

C/2026 A1 (MAPS) was discovered from the AMACS1 Observatory at San Pedro de Atacama, using a 0.28 m (11 in) f/2.2 Schmidt telescope with a CCD camera. It was discovered at a distance of 2.056 AU (307.6 million km; 191.1 million mi) from the Sun, making it the furthest Kreutz sungrazer ever discovered, surpassing the record previously held by Comet Ikeya–Seki, (Note: Comet Ikeya–Seki was first discovered at a distance of 1.11 AU (166 million km) from the Sun on 18 September 1965, which gave astronomers approximately 33 days to observe the comet inbound.) allowing a lead time of observations for approximately 81 days before perihelion.

The comet was 17.8 magnitude at the moment of discovery and was located in the constellation Columba.

Earliest precovery date is December 2025, when it was about magnitude 20. Its discovery was officially announced on 20 January 2026. It is expected to become visible in 8 to 10-inch telescopes by late March, a few days before perihelion. By mid March it had brightened to an apparent magnitude of about 10. It will cross the celestial equator on 30 March 2026. Due to its relatively low declination in the sky relative to the Sun, it will become more favorable to view from the Southern hemisphere than in the north.

Throughout March 2026, the comet was seen from the western horizon roughly until 30–45 minutes after sunset. The comet steadily brightened until 22 March. Two outbursts were detected by the IRAM 30m telescope on 1 and 3 April 2026 that released about 0.4–1.2% of the comet's total mass, suggesting it experienced pre-disruption before entering the Sun's Roche limit at perihelion.

The comet disintegrated a few hours before it came to solar conjunction on 4 April 2026. Larger debris would have passed behind the Sun at around 13:20 and then again at 15:36 UT (in front of the Sun). For both, it was 0.04 degrees from the center of the Sun (the Sun has a width of 0.5 degrees). It entered SOHO–LASCO's field-of-view on 2 April 2026 and CCOR-1 on 3 April.

Submicron-sized dust being pushed by solar radiation pressure re-emerged on the opposite side of the Sun post-perihelion.

== Orbit ==
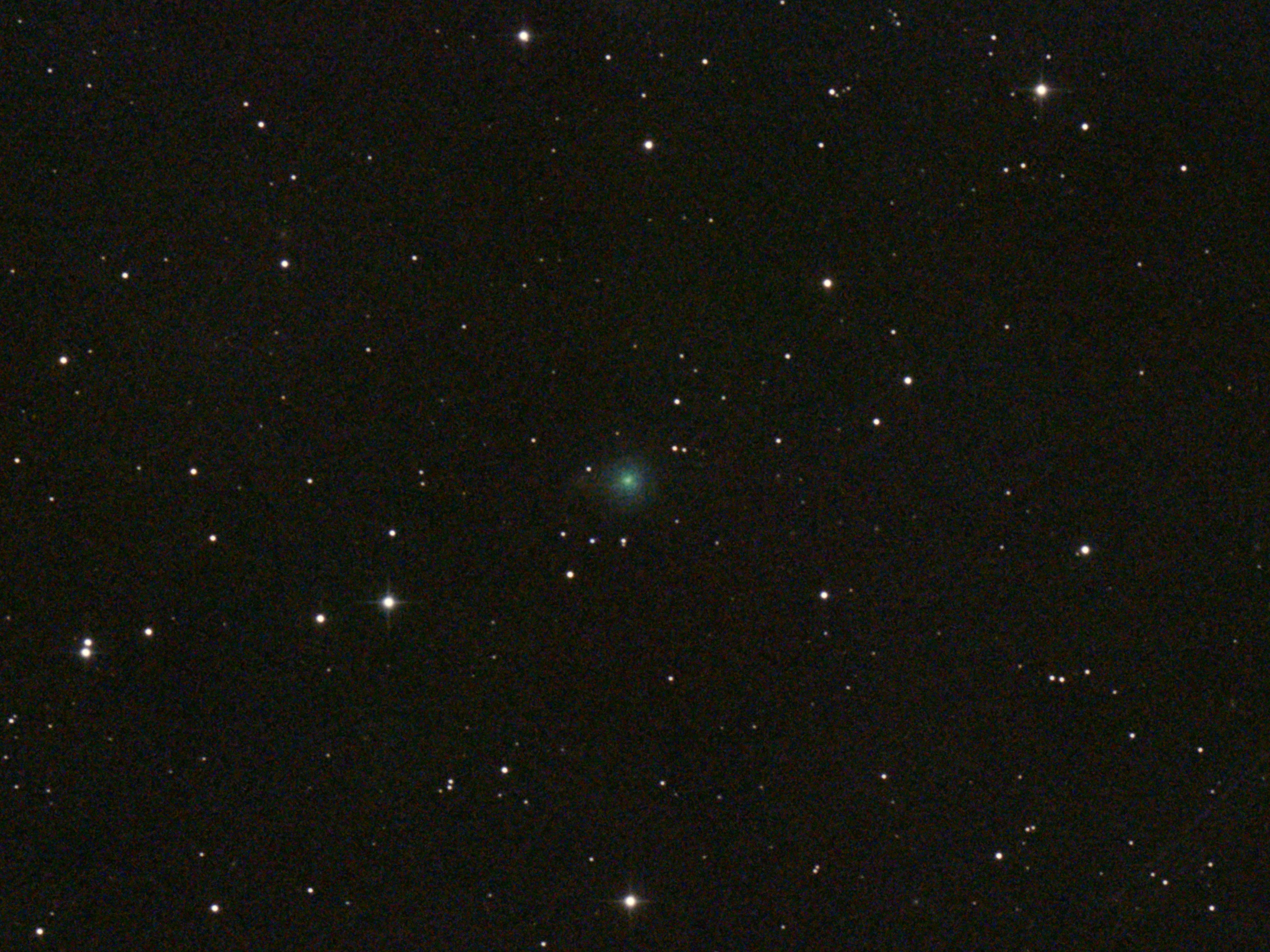
C/2026 A1 on 9 March 2026

C/2026 A1 was a Kreutz group comet. It was initially thought to belong to the Pe subgroup, a subgroup of the Kreutz Sungrazers closely associated with subgroup I, which all fragmented from the Great Comet of 1106. This specific subgroup include some bright members like the Great Comet of 1843 and C/1963 R1 (Pereyra). (Note: The Great Comet of 1843 passed 132000 km from the surface of the Sun and C/1963 R1 (Pereyra) passed 56000 km from the surface of the Sun. With a short observation arc of 8 days, the Kreutz Great Southern Comet of 1887 is believed to have passed about 27000 km from the surface of the Sun. Sun-plunger (with a sun-striking trajectory and non-Kreutz member) C/2007 M5 (SOHO), if it did not get vaporized by the extreme solar radiation and tidal forces, would have tried to impact the Sun at 0.0011 AU (160 thousand km; 100 thousand mi) from the Sun's center.) However, its extraordinarily long orbital period suggested it's only a coincidence and it may possibly be a member of a yet-unknown distinct subgroup instead. Further research by Zdenek Sekanina and Malgorzata Krolikowska suggested that based on the detection of three other small Kreutz sungrazers that preceded C/2026 A1, the comet may have been part of a larger object related to the parent body of C/1843 D1 that separated around 363 AD and therefore a part of the Population I subgroup. It is hypothesized that increasingly complex outgassing contributed to its unusually long orbital period compared to other Kreutz sungrazers shortly after separating from its parent body.

The comet disintegrated shortly（ approximately 1 ～ 5 hours） before reaching perihelion. It was projected to reach perihelion around 14:22 UT on 4 April 2026 when it would have been 0.005729 AU (1.232 R_{☉}) from the center of the Sun or about 161,000 km from the surface of the Sun. There was no chance of a solar impact as the 5-sigma uncertainty was only ±1000 km, (Note: JPL #11 at the JPL SBDB shows a 1-sigma uncertainty of 1.1×10^{−6} AU which is a 1-sigma uncertainty of 165 km or a 5-sigma uncertainty of 1000 km (5×1.1×10^{−6} AU).) giving a minimum possible approach of about 160000 km. If it had not disintegrated, it would have then made its closest approach to Earth the next day around 5 April 2026 23:57 UT when it would have been 0.961 AU (143.8 million km) from Earth.

With an observation arc of 74 days, the comet's inbound orbital period (calculated at epoch 1800, which is before entering the planetary region of the Solar System) suggests it previously reached perihelion around 1695 years ago, suggesting that it may be a second-generation fragment from the Great Comet of 371 BC itself, specifically one of the daylight comets of 363 AD that was witnessed by Ammianus Marcellinus.

== Physical characteristics ==
In January 2026, initial estimates of the upper limit for the size of its nucleus placed it at less than 2.4 km (1.5 mi) in diameter. A study published in March 2026 using the data from the James Webb Space Telescope (JWST) concluded that the comet is roughly 400 m (1,300 ft) in diameter, about the size of C/2011 W3 (Lovejoy); however, its authors noted that the comparison has to be treated with caution as C/2026 A1 is the only Kreutz comet that has direct measurements of its nucleus out of the more than 5,000 members of the family known so far.

Prior to disintegration, C/2026 A1 became the first Kreutz sungrazer where hydrogen cyanide (HCN) gas were detected, alongside trace amounts of HNC, CS, H_{2}CO, CO, OCS and CH_{3}OH within its coma.

== Gallery ==
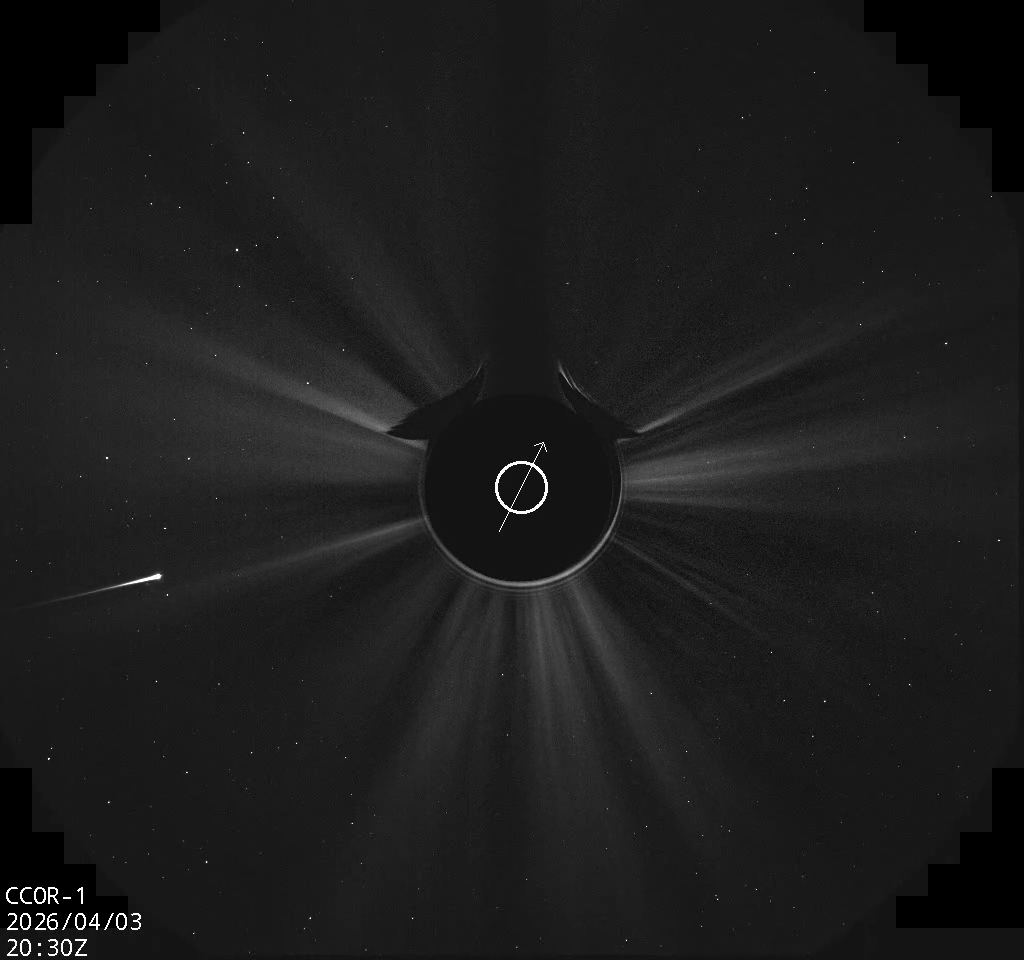
C/2026 A1 before it disappeared behind the coronagraph CCOR-1 of GOES-19.

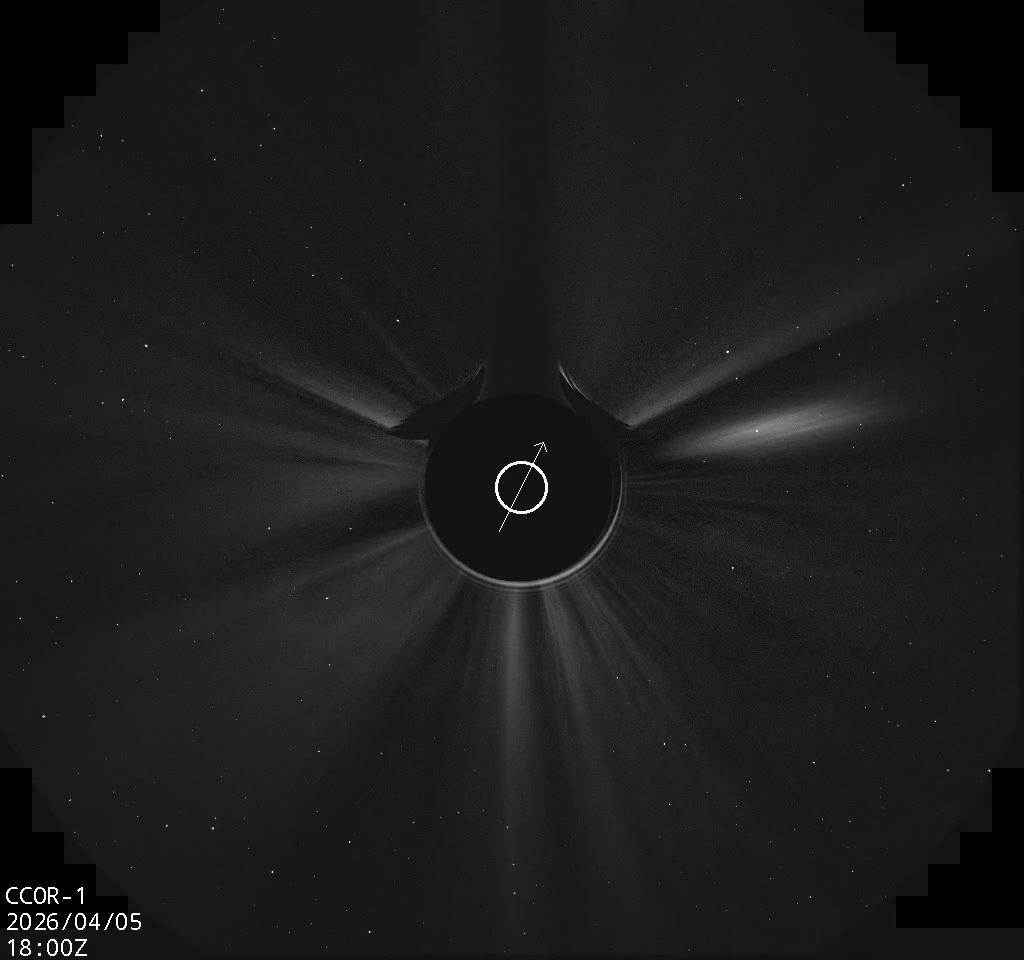
What is left of the comet's dust tail reappearing near the 2 o'clock position.

== See also ==
- 115P/Maury, the first comet discovered by one of Comet MAPS' discoverers, Alain J. Maury
- List of Kreutz sungrazers
  - C/2011 W3 (Lovejoy), the Great Comet of 2011
  - C/2012 E2 (SWAN)
  - C/2024 S1 (ATLAS)
