= Great Southern Comet of 1880 =

Kreutz sungrazer comet

C/1880 C1 (Great Southern Comet of 1880)
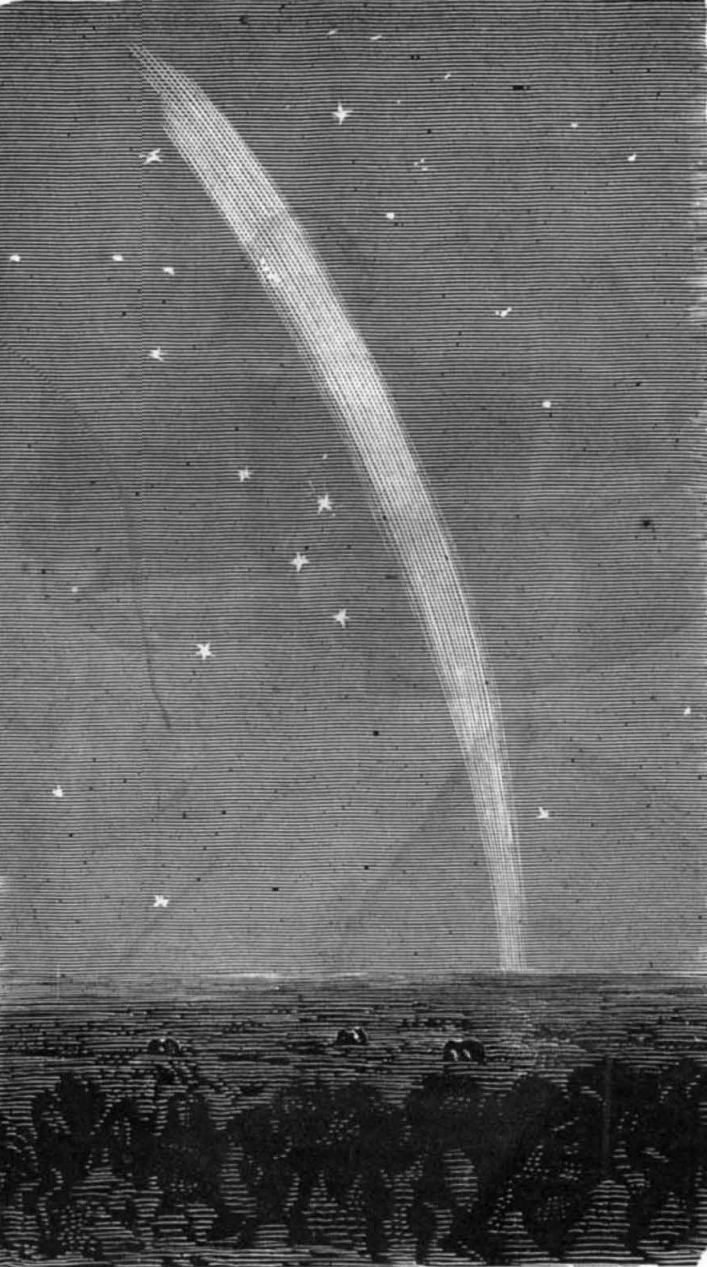
- Illustration of the Great Comet of 1880 from a Scientific American article in May 1880

Discovery
- Discovery date: 1 February 1880

Designations
- Alternative designations: 1880 I, 1880a

Orbital characteristics
- Epoch: 14 February 1880 (JD 2407759.5)
- Observation arc: 5 days (short arc)
- Number of observations: 7 (small sample size)
- Orbit type: Kreutz sungrazer
- Perihelion: 0.0054 AU (1.2 R_{☉}) (Note: Given a short 5-day observation arc, JPL #2 at the JPL SBDB shows a 1-sigma uncertainty of 0.0016 AU (240,000 km; 150,000 mi) in the perihelion distance.)
- Semi-major axis: –521 AU
- Eccentricity: 1.0±0.003
- Max. orbital speed: 575 km/s
- Inclination: 145°±8°
- Longitude of ascending node: 8.4°±61°
- Argument of periapsis: 86.7°±53°
- Last perihelion: 28 January 1880
- Earth MOID: 0.55 AU
- Jupiter MOID: 2.97 AU

Physical characteristics
- Mean radius: 1.1 km (0.68 mi)
- Mass: 2.00×10^{15} kg
- Comet total magnitude (M1): 7.1–8.9
- Apparent magnitude: 3.0 (1880 apparition)

The Great Southern Comet of 1880, formally designated as C/1880 C1 in modern nomenclature, is a comet that became visible in the naked eye throughout the Southern hemisphere in February 1880. It is notable for being classified as a "great comet" not by its apparent magnitude, but by its prominent tail. The comet is believed to have passed around 110,000 km (68,000 mi) from the surface of the Sun. (Note: Comet C/1880 C1 is believed to have passed about 0.00537 AU (803,300 km) from the center of the Sun: 803300 km – Sun's radius of 695700 km = 107,600 km (66,900 mi) from the surface of the Sun.)

== Discovery and observations ==
The comet had no single discoverer, or at least none is known, since all of its initial observations were not first-hand reports. However, it is generally agreed that the comet was first seen on the evening of 1 February 1880 in Australia and New Zealand. The first known sighting of the comet was recorded by Henry C. Russell, the director of the Sydney Observatory, when he received a message from "a certain gentleman living in the northern part of this colony", stating that he "was surprised by a bright streak of light, stretching from the horizon towards the South Pole".

== Orbit ==
Approximate relationship of the largest members of the Kreutz Sungrazers. Note that the perihelion passage at which fragmentations occurred may not be well established

A study of the orbit of C/1880 C1 showed that it has essentially the same orbit as the Great Comet of 1843 and the Great September Comet of 1882. This led to some astronomers to believe that these were all appearances of the same comet that somehow had its orbit change significantly on each perihelion passage. However, subsequent recalculations of their orbits show that this is not the case, as the orbital periods of these comets were found to be between 600 and 800 years in length. In 1888, Heinrich Kreutz concluded that they were fragments of an earlier giant sungrazing comet that broken up several centuries prior.

These comets, alongside Ikeya–Seki, White–Ortiz–Bolelli, and Lovejoy, are members of the Kreutz sungrazer group. It is thought that both C/1880 C1 and C/1887 B1 broke off directly from the Great Comet of 1843, about 100–150 days after the latter's previous perihelion passage sometime in the 11th century.
