= Historical comet observations in China =

Overview of Chinese records of comets

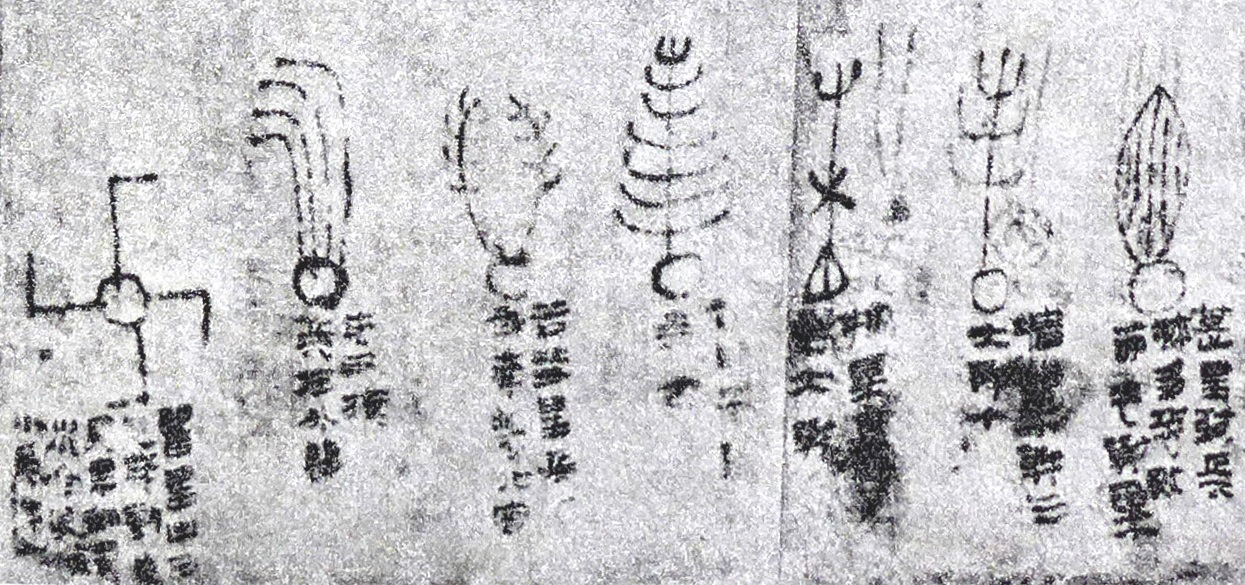
Detail of astrology manuscript, ink on silk, 2nd century BC, Han dynasty, unearthed from Mawangdui tomb. The page gives descriptions and illustrations of seven comets, from a total of 29 found in the document.

Chinese records of comets are the most extensive and accurate in existence from the ancient and medieval periods and stretch back across three millennia. Records exist at least as far back as 613 BC, and records may have been kept for many centuries earlier. There are continuous records all the way through to the nineteenth century and use substantially consistent methods throughout. Chinese data accuracy is unsurpassed in the ancient world and was not overtaken by Western accuracy until the fifteenth century or, in some respects, the twentieth century.

Comets were observed in great detail because of their astrological significance. However, these observations are now of great use to modern astronomers. Their accuracy is sufficient to allow the calculation of orbital elements, and modern astronomers have done this for many comets. Most notably, ancient orbits of Halley's Comet have been determined using Chinese records, a feat not possible solely from modern data because of a close approach of the comet to Earth in the ninth century. Such close approaches cause comet orbits to change abruptly, and ancient changes of that sort cannot be accurately modelled from the comet's present-day orbital data.

== Chinese records ==
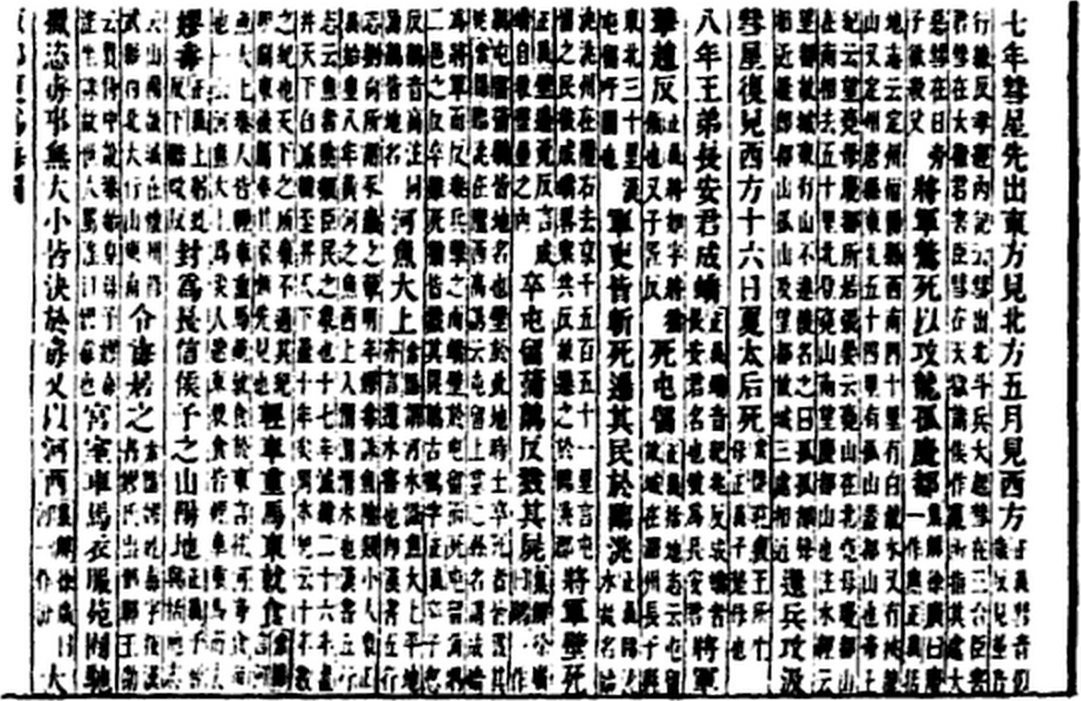
Report of the 240 BC apparition of Halley's Comet from the Shiji (史記)

Ancient Chinese records of comet observations are the most extensive historical records in existence. They are far more complete than European observations. The earliest confirmed Chinese comet observation is from 613 BC, but there is also a possible sighting of Halley's Comet in 1059 BC. However, it may not be an actual sighting but the result of later back calculation.

Early records call comets beixing (or boxing: 孛星, "bushy star" or "sparkling star" according to Yeomans et al.). Later on, a distinction is made between beixing and huixing (彗星, "broom star"), that is, comets without, and with a tail respectively. The broomstick here is a metaphor for the tail and the broomhead the head of the comet. Chinese astronomers were the first to observe that comet tails point away from the sun, which they knew by at least 635 AD, many centuries before the phenomenon was observed in the West. Other descriptive Chinese names for comet include saoxing (掃星, "sweeping star"), tianchan (天攙, "heavenly intermingler"), fengxing (篷星, "sailing star"), changxing (長星, "long star"), and zhuxing (燭星, "candle-flame star").

The Chinese records are not only the most extensive from ancient times but also the most accurate, often to within half a degree of right ascension. Western measurements did not overtake them for accuracy until the fifteenth century. In 1456, Paolo Toscanelli tracked the progress of Halley's Comet to within a fraction of a degree.

Finding the time of a Chinese observation is a little more problematic.It can be very important for fast moving objects like comets. However, the dates are recorded, and the time can be estimated to within one or two hours by considering when the Chinese observers would have had good viewing conditions. Comets that actually have a tail can be described as beixing when they are in opposition and the tail is not visible, giving a further clue.

Chinese records of comet brightness are superior to Western observations to an even later date. The West did not overtake Chinese astronomers in this respect until the twentieth century, at least in the matter of diligent recording of brightnesses.

=== List of records ===
The following documents contain substantial comet observations. Many other local documents have useful information and have been incorporated into various compilations.

==== Early sources ====
- Spring and Autumn Annals, annals of the State of Lu, traditionally attributed to Confucius.
- Records of the Grand Historian, the first comprehensive history of China, by Sima Qian.
- Book of Wei, the official history of the Wei dynasty. The book contains only summary information from the now-lost official astronomer's records but nevertheless has reasonably accurate information.

==== Compilations ====
An astronomical text recovered from Tomb no.3 in Mawangdui contains images and descriptions of 29 different comets. The descriptions often include the comet's name; notes about its apparition; and its associated portent, usually military, but lack detailed dates of the comets' sightings. The text can be solidly dated as being prior to 168 BC, the date assigned to the tomb. It may be associated with a similar astronomical text from the same tomb, which details planetary motions for the seventy years ending 177 BC.

Wenxian Tongkao, a 13th-century compilation by Ma Duanlin, includes a list of comets up to 1222 AD. Various European authors used this list as a basis for their own lists starting with Antoine Gaubil who translated it from the Chinese and later extended the list to 1644 AD. The most complete European list was published by John Williams (1797–1874) in 1871. Williams' list contains 372 comets from 613 BC to 1621 AD. A Chinese compilation published in 1988, A Comprehensive Collection of Ancient Chinese Astronomical Records (Zhongguo gudai tianxiang jilu zongji), has over 1000 comet observations.

== Importance to modern astronomers ==
The Chinese records have some importance to modern science because they allow astronomers to deduce the past orbits and brightnesses of comets.That is important because comet orbits are not always entirely regular. They can be changed by gravitational encounters with the planets. Without ancient records, such past changes would be very difficult to determine. A feature of the Chinese records that makes them particularly useful for modern scientists and scholars is that there is a high degree of consistency in the methods of observation and recording over a very long period. Chinese astronomers were still using naked eye observation in 1835, long after the invention of the telescope.

Around 20 comets have had their orbits calculated based entirely on ancient Chinese records. Of the well-known comets, besides Halley, Brian G. Marsden suggested, based on Chinese and other ancient observations, that the Great Comet of 1106 was a previous apparition of Comet Ikeya–Seki. Ikeya–Seki is a member of the Kreutz sungrazer family of comets. All of them are thought to have originated from the break up of a large parent comet. Several previously-unknown members of the group have been found in the Chinese records.

=== Halley's Comet ===
Chinese observations of Halley's Comet are of special importance to astronomers because of the important place that the comet had in their growing understanding of them. The earliest confirmed sighting was in 240 BC (in the Records of the Grand Historian)—with a continuous record after 164 BC. A comet observed in 467 BC may have been Halley, but there is insufficient information to be sure. The most accurate records of Halley begin in 12 BC.

In 1843, the engineer and sinologist Édouard Biot translated Chinese records of comets. The astronomer John Russell Hind observed that most past apparitions of Halley back to 12 BC could be matched to the Chinese records.

A computer calculation of the past orbits of Halley using numerical integration could not continue past 837 AD because a very close approach to Earth made calculation of orbits prior to that too inaccurate. The researchers had started with accurate European measurements from 1759, 1682 and 1607 AD and calculated backwards. However, no accurate European records exist for 837 AD and so the researchers looked to Chinese records. From those, they obtained a good estimate of the perihelion of Halley for that year, which they used, together with perihelions found from Chinese data for 374 and 141 AD, to provide constraints for their calculation. They finally calculated the orbits of Halley back to 1404 BC.

Studies of historical changes in brightness of Halley's Comet have also been carried out using ancient Chinese data. There has been no regular recording of the brightness of Halley in the West prior to the 1910 apparition. The Chinese records, on the other hand, are almost complete from 12 BC to 1835 AD.

== Comets in Chinese astrology ==
Ancient Chinese astrology set great store by celestial omens such as comets, which were important and always disastrous. Under the theory of Wu Xing, comets were thought to signify an imbalance of yin and yang. Chinese emperors employed observers specifically to watch for them. Some important decisions were made as a result. For instance, Emperor Ruizong of Tang abdicated after a comet appearance in 712 AD.

Comets were thought to have military significance. For instance, the breakup of a comet on 25 January 35 AD was interpreted as portending the destruction of Gongsun Shu by Wu Han, general to emperor Guangwu.

== Bibliography ==
- Ho Peng Yoke (2000) [1985]. "Chinese Astronomical Records". Li, Qi and Shu: An Introduction to Science and Civilization in China. Dover. pp. 150–152. ISBN 978-0-486-41445-4.
- Loewe, Michael (1995) [1994]. Divination, Mythology and Monarchy in Han China. Cambridge University Press. ISBN 978-0-521-45466-7.
- Needham, Joseph, Science and Civilisation in China: Volume 3, Mathematics and the Sciences of the Heavens and the Earth, Cambridge University Press, 1959 ISBN 0-521-05801-5.
- Schafer, Edward H. (2005) [1977]. Pacing the Void: T'ang approaches to the stars. University of California Press. ISBN 1-891640-14-3.
- Stephenson, Richard; Yau, Kevin, "Oriental tales of Halley's Comet", New Scientist, vol. 103, no. 1423, pp. 30–32, 27 September 1984 ISSN 0262-4079
- Strom, R., "Daytime observations of sungrazing comets in Chinese annals", Astronomy & Astrophysics, vol. 387, no. 2, pp. L17-L20, May 2002.
- Williams, John, Observations of Comets from B.C. 611 to A.D. 1640: Extracted from the Chinese Annals, Strangways and Walden, 1871 OCLC 46620702.
- Xu, Zhentao; Pankenier, David W.; Jiang, Yaotiao, East-Asian Archaeoastronomy, CRC Press, 2000 ISBN 90-5699-302-X.
- Yeomans, Donald K.; Kiang, Tao, "The long-term motion of comet Halley", Monthly Notices of the Royal Astronomical Society, vol. 197, iss. 3, pp. 633–646, 11 March 1981.
- Yeomans, D. K.; Rahe, J.; Freitag, R. S. (1986). "The history of comet Halley". Journal of the Royal Astronomical Society of Canada. 80: 62. Bibcode:1986JRASC..80...62Y.
