= C/2024 S1 (ATLAS) =

Kreutz sungrazer comet

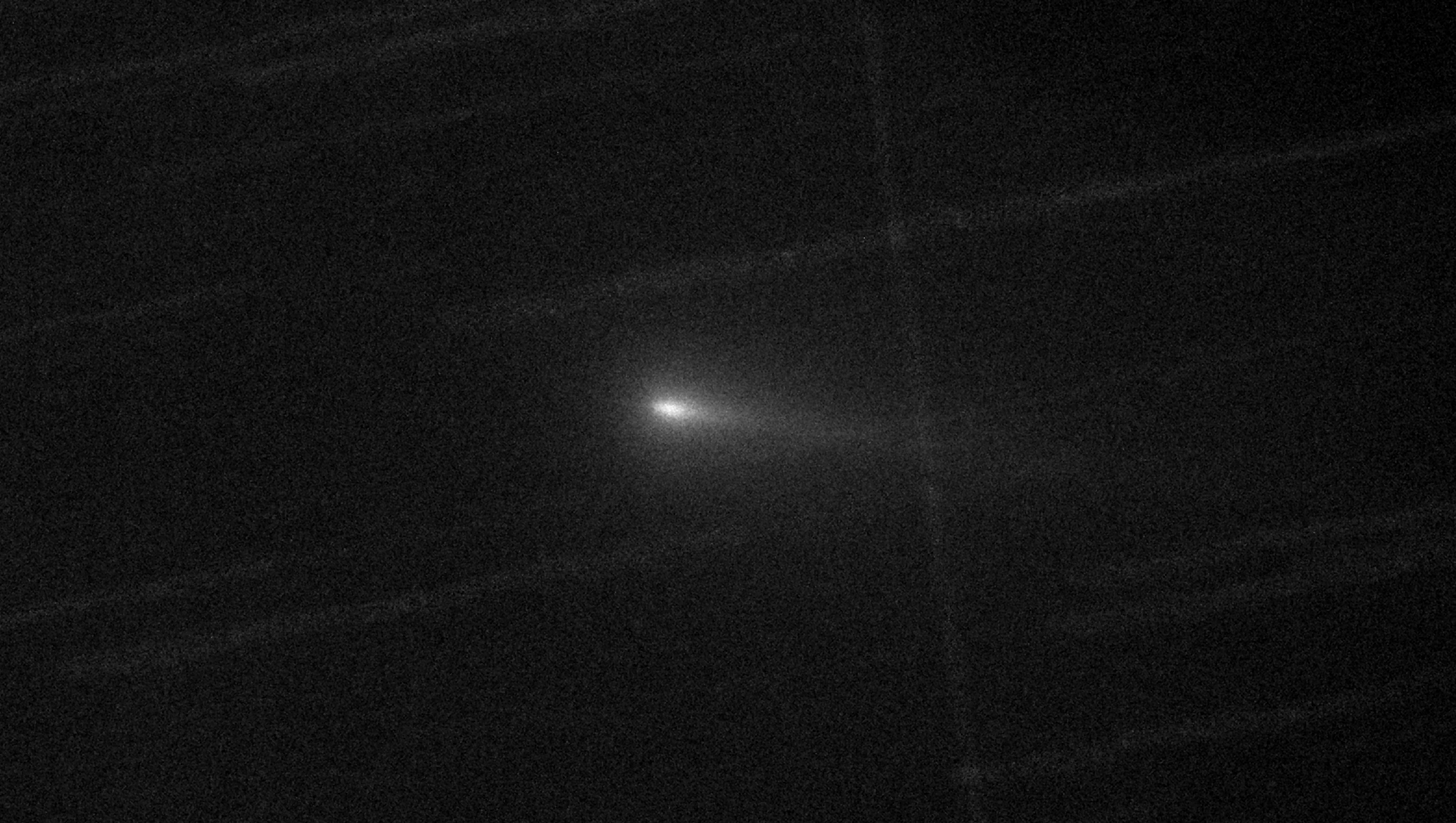
- The comet on 11 October 2024

Discovery
- Discovered by: Robert Siverd
- Discovery site: ATLAS–HKO (T05)
- Discovery date: 27 September 2024

Designations
- Alternative designations: A11bP7I

Orbital characteristics
- Epoch: 5 October 2024 (JD 2460588.5)
- Observation arc: 23 days
- Number of observations: 289
- Orbit type: Kreutz sungrazer (Population II)
- Aphelion: 193±11 AU
- Perihelion: 0.00795 AU (1.71 R_{☉})
- Semi-major axis: 96±5 AU
- Eccentricity: 0.9999
- Orbital period: 944±80 years
- Inclination: 141.901°±0.004°
- Longitude of ascending node: 347.15°±0.03°
- Argument of periapsis: 69.16°±0.02°
- Last perihelion: 28 October 2024
- Earth MOID: 0.515 AU
- Jupiter MOID: 0.291 AU

Physical characteristics
- Mean diameter: <1.2 km (0.75 mi)
- Comet total magnitude (M1): 15.3
- Apparent magnitude: 8.2 (2024 apparition)

C/2024 S1 (ATLAS) (also known by its temporary designation A11bP7I) was a sungrazing comet that was discovered from the ATLAS–HKO in Hawaii on 27 September 2024. The comet passed its perihelion on 28 October 2024, at a distance of about 0.008 AU (1.2 million km; 0.74 million mi) from the center of the Sun (500000 km from the surface of the Sun), and disintegrated. The comet was a member of the Population II subgroup of the Kreutz sungrazers, which also includes the Great Comet of 1882 and Ikeya–Seki.

== Observational history ==
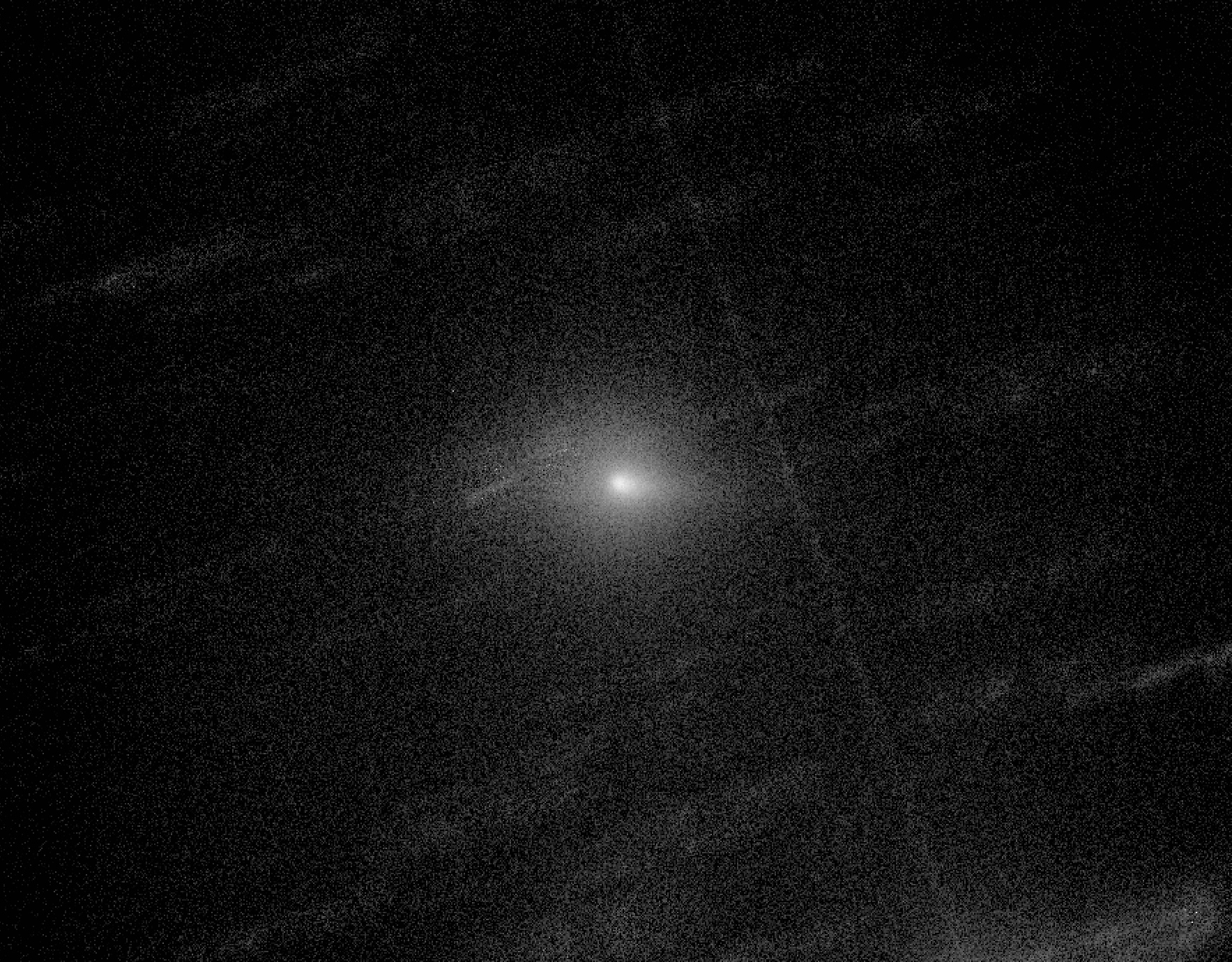
Image of the comet from Rio Hurtado, Chile on 28 September 2024

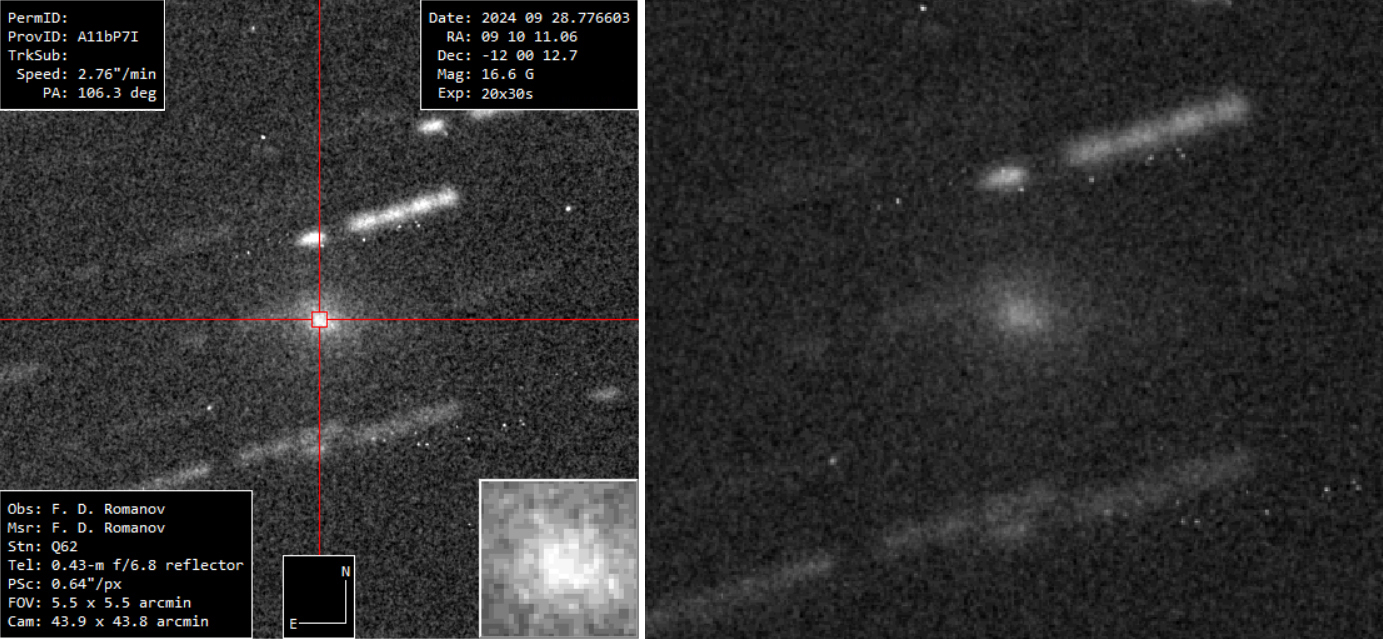
Image of the comet from the Siding Spring Observatory on 28 September 2024

The comet was discovered during the ATLAS survey, using a 0.5-m reflector telescope located at Haleakala, Hawaii. It is the second Kreutz comet discovered from the ground since C/2011 W3 (Lovejoy), and is likely a fragment of the same parent body that also produced C/1882 R1 and C/1965 S1 (Ikeya–Seki). The comet then was estimated to have an apparent magnitude of 15.3 and featured a coma about a half arcminute across. Further observations reported the coma was as large as three arcminutes across and the tail up to 156 arcseconds long. The comet had upon discovery a greenish color, probably due to the presence of diatomic carbon. The apparent magnitude of the comet was variously reported to range from magnitude 16.9 up to 11.5. The presence of the green coma indicated that it was closer to 11.5. A visual observation was reported with a 30-cm reflector telescope, with a reported magnitude of 11.7. The comet upon discovery was located in the constellation of Hydra. The comet kept to a magnitude of 12–13 throughout the next week.

Animation of C/2024 S1 around Sun C/2024 S1 · Sun · Mercury · Venus · Earth · Mars

On 8 October the comet was found to be elongated and to lack a central condensation, and to be overall fainter than it was on 3 October, indicating that the comet possibly disintegrated, similarly to C/2019 Y4 (ATLAS) in 2020. The comet on 8 October was located 0.802 AU from the Sun, which although not too close, could be enough for gases to have vaporized and in combination with tidal or rotational forces may have led to the fragmentation of the nucleus. However, later observations from October 15 onwards consistently showed a well-condensed nucleus, and the comet underwent a 2-magnitude outburst between October 15 and 16. On 19 October the coma was reported to be triangular in shape and 2.4 arcminutes across while a tail 24 arcminutes long was observed. On 20 October the comet was reported to have an apparent magnitude of 8.2 but the next day it was reported it had faded to 10, while the coma and tail decreased in size, indicating another outburst had taken place. On 23 October, with the comet being 4.5 degrees above the horizon, the coma was one arcminute across, had a total magnitude of 10.8 and the tail was 17 arcminutes long.

On 26 October 2024, Hanjie Tan, a PhD student from Guangzhou, reported the discovery of a fragment ahead of C/2024 S1 in LASCO C3 images.

Just a few hours before reaching perihelion the comet evaporated within two hours which could be seen on images from SOHO LASCO C2 around 28 October 07:00 UTC. The comet was predicted to be visible in the morning sky before perihelion, with better visibility from the southern hemisphere. During perihelion, if the comet had not disintegrated, it could have brightened to a magnitude of -5 to -7, which is brighter than the planet Venus. If it had survived perihelion it would be visible again before dawn, more favorably located for the southern hemisphere, and could have looked like C/2011 W3 (Lovejoy), another Kreutz sungrazer.

It is theorized that C/2024 S1 (ATLAS) had disintegrated due to the combined effects of rotational instability and sublimation loss shortly before it reached perihelion.

== See also ==
- C/2023 A3 (Tsuchinshan–ATLAS), a comet that became visible to the naked eye in early October 2024
- C/1945 X1 (du Toit), another Kreutz sungrazer that was detected and disintegrated before perihelion
