= Great Comet of 1882 =

Kreutz sungrazer comet

C/1882 R1 (Great Comet of 1882)
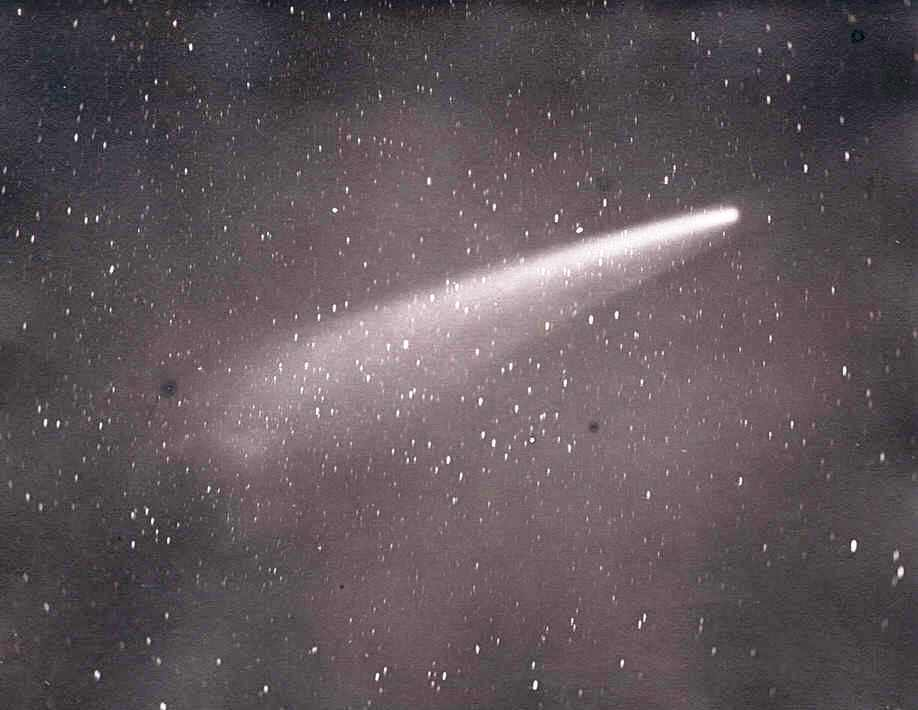
- Photograph of the comet taken by David Gill in Cape Town on 7 November 1882

Discovery
- Discovery date: 1 September 1882

Designations
- Alternative designations: 1882 II, 1882b

Orbital characteristics
- Epoch: 21 September 1882 (JD 2408709.5)
- Observation arc: 110–153 days
- Number of observations: 4–10
- Orbit type: Kreutz sungrazer (Population II)
- Aphelion: 153.46 AU (A); 166.71 AU (B); 182.37 AU (C); 193.72 AU (D)
- Perihelion: 0.0077 AU
- Semi-major axis: 76.73 AU (A); 83.36 AU (B); 91.19 AU (C); 96.86 AU (D)
- Eccentricity: 0.99989 (A); 0.99991 (B); 0.99992 (C–D)
- Orbital period: ≈670–950 years
- Inclination: 142°
- Longitude of ascending node: 347.65°
- Argument of periapsis: 69.58°
- Last perihelion: 17 September 1882
- Next perihelion: 2487–2719
- T_{Jupiter}: –0.018 (A); –0.024 (B); –0.029 (C); –0.032 (D)
- Earth MOID: 0.5164 AU
- Jupiter MOID: 2.9096 AU

Physical characteristics
- Mean radius: 29.65 km (18.42 mi) (Note: Estimated size of the original nucleus is approximately 59.3 km (36.8 mi) in diameter before disintegrating on perihelion.) Fragments: (A) = 9.15 km (5.69 mi); (B) = 6.0 km (3.7 mi); (C) = 3.05 km (1.90 mi); (D) = 3.25 km (2.02 mi); (E) = 1.5 km (0.93 mi); (F) = 6.7 km (4.2 mi)
- Mass: 4.20×10^{19} kg
- Comet total magnitude (M1): 0.8
- Apparent magnitude: –17.0 (1882 apparition)

The Great Comet of 1882, formally designated as C/1882 R1, 1882 II, and 1882b, was a comet which became very bright in September 1882. It is classified as one of the Kreutz sungrazers, a family of comets which pass within 1 R_{☉} of the Sun's photosphere at perihelion.

The comet was bright enough to be visible next to the Sun in the daytime sky at its perihelion. The comet made its closest approach to Earth on 16 September 1882 at 0.99 AU and then came to perihelion (closest approach to the Sun) the next day on 17 September. Reaching a peak magnitude of –17, some sources claim that C/1882 R1 is the brightest comet ever recorded in history.

== Discovery ==
The comet appeared in the morning skies of September 1882. Reports suggest that it was first seen as early as 1 September 1882, from the Cape of Good Hope as well as the Gulf of Guinea, and over the next few days many observers in the Southern Hemisphere reported the new comet.

The first astronomer to record observations of the comet was W. H. Finlay, the Chief Assistant at the Royal Observatory in Cape Town, South Africa. Finlay's observation on 7 September 1882, 16:00 GMT was also an independent discovery, and he reported that the comet had an apparent magnitude of about 3, and a tail about a degree in length.

The comet brightened rapidly, and within days had become an exceptionally bright object. Her Majesty's Astronomer at the Cape, David Gill, reported watching the comet rise a few minutes before the Sun on 18 September, and described it: "The nucleus was then undoubtedly single, and certainly rather under than over 4″ in diameter; in fact, as I have described it, it resembled very much a star of the 1st magnitude seen by daylight." (Note: 4″ is 4/60 of a minute of arc, and a minute is 1/60 of a degree.)

== Perihelion ==
The comet was rapidly approaching perihelion when it was first seen. At perihelion, the comet is estimated to have been only 300,000 miles or 480,000 kilometres (0.0032 AU) from the Sun's surface. Subsequent orbital studies have determined that it was a sungrazing comet, one which passes extremely close to the surface of the Sun. For many hours on either side of its perihelion passage, the comet was easily visible in the daytime sky next to the Sun. It reached an estimated magnitude of −17.

Shortly after perihelion was reached on 17 September, the comet transited the Sun. At the Cape, Finlay observed the comet with the aid of a neutral density filter right up until the moment of transit, when the Sun's limb was "boiling all about it". Finlay noted that the comet disappeared from view very suddenly, and no trace of it could be seen against the Sun's surface.

== Post-perihelion evolution ==
After its perihelion passage, the comet moved into dark skies, and although it faded as it receded from the Sun it remained one of the most prominent objects in the sky. On 30 September, observers, including Finlay and E. E. Barnard, began to notice that the comet's nucleus was elongated and broken into two pronounced bright balls of light, and by 17 October it was clear that it had broken into at least five fragments. Observers reported that the relative brightness of the fragments varied from day to day.

The nucleus reached its maximum apparent size in December 1882. The comet faded gradually, but despite its fragmentation it remained visible to the naked eye until February 1883. The last definite sighting of the comet was made by B. A. Gould at Córdoba on 1 June 1883.

== Orbital studies ==
Studies of the orbit of the comet showed that the Great Comet of 1882 was moving on an almost identical path to previous great comets seen in C/1843 D1 and C/1880 C1. These comets had also suddenly appeared in the morning sky and had passed extremely close to the Sun at perihelion. One suggestion was that all three were in fact the same comet, with an orbital period that was being drastically shortened at each perihelion passage. However, studies showed this to be untenable, as the orbital period of this comet is 772 ± 3 years.

Heinrich Kreutz studied the orbits of the three great comets, and developed the idea that the three comets were fragments of a much larger progenitor comet which had broken up at an earlier perihelion passage. The fragmentation of the Great Comet of 1882 itself demonstrated that this was plausible. It is now thought that the Great Comet of 1882 is a fragment of a comet that passed perihelion in early 12th century, and that C/1945 X1 (du Toit) and C/1965 S1 (Ikeya–Seki) are two of its sister fragments. It is now well established that the comets C/1843 D1, C/1880 C1, C/1882 R1, C/1887 B1, C/1963 R1, C/1965 S1, and C/1970 K1 are all members of a family known as the Kreutz sungrazers, which are all descended from one comet.

Brian G. Marsden suggested that the comet of 372–371 BC may have been the source of the group. However, more recent models do not support this supposition. The comet of 372–371 BC is often associated with Aristotle who, along with others from his time, described that comet in his writings. However, Aristotle was only twelve at the time of the comet's appearance and the historian, Callisthenes of Olynthus, who also wrote about it was born ten years after its appearance. Consequently, their reports should not be taken as eyewitness accounts. Further, there is no mention of the comet in Chinese literature of the time. Instead either the comet of February 423 or of February 467 with orbital periods of around 700 years is now considered the likely progenitor of the Sungrazers. Fragments of the Great Comet of 1882 should return around 2487 (A) to 2719 (D).

== See also ==
- C/1882 F1 (Wells)
- X/1882 K1 (Tewfik)
- Luís Cruls

== Bibliography ==
- Clerke, Agnes M. (1908). "Plate III. The Great Comet of September 1882". A Popular History of Astronomy during the Nineteenth Century. London, UK: Adam & Charles Black.
- Gill, David (April 1883b). "note on the nucleus of the Great Comet (b) 1882". Monthly Notices of the Royal Astronomical Society. 43 (6): 319–321. Bibcode:1883MNRAS..43..319G. doi:10.1093/mnras/43.6.319a.
- Plummer, William E. (March 1889). "The Great Comet of September 1882". The Observatory. 12: 140–142. Bibcode:1889Obs....12..140P.
- Sekanina, Zdeněk; Chodas, Paul W. (July 2007). "Fragmentation Hierarchy of Bright Sungrazing Comets and the Birth and Orbital Evolution of the Kreutz System. II. The Case for Cascading Fragmentation". The Astrophysical Journal. 663 (1): 657–676. Bibcode:2007ApJ...663..657S. doi:10.1086/517490. S2CID 56347169.
- Tebbutt, John (March 1904). "The Great Comet of 1882". The Observatory. 27: 133–134. Bibcode:1904Obs....27..133T.
