= C/2011 N3 (SOHO) =

Kreutz sungrazer comet

Discovery
- Discovered by: SOHO; Masanori Uchina
- Discovery date: 4 July 2011

Designations
- Alternative designations: SOHO-2107

Orbital characteristics
- Epoch: 5 July 2011 (JD 2455747.5)
- Observation arc: 2 days
- Number of observations: 114
- Orbit type: Kreutz sungrazer
- Perihelion: 0.0053 AU
- Eccentricity: 1.00027
- Max. orbital speed: ~650 km/s
- Inclination: 144.44°
- Longitude of ascending node: 6.431°
- Argument of periapsis: 85.046°
- Mean anomaly: –0.011°
- Last perihelion: 6 July 2011
- Earth MOID: 0.555 AU
- Jupiter MOID: 2.991 AU

Physical characteristics
- Mean radius: 0.005–0.025 km (0.0031–0.0155 mi)
- Mass: ~5.9 million tons
- Apparent magnitude: ~1.0 (2011 apparition)

C/2011 N3 (SOHO), also known as SOHO-2107, was a Kreutz sungrazer comet that disintegrated during perihelion on 6 July 2011. In January 2012, it was revealed that the comet was also observed by the Solar Dynamics Observatory (SDO) in extreme ultraviolet (EUV) light, (Note: C/2011 N3 is the first comet of the Kreutz sungrazer family to be observed in extreme ultraviolet (EUV) light.) providing rare insights to its actual chemical composition, mass, and nucleus size.

== See also ==
- List of Kreutz sungrazers
