= Great Comet of 371 BC =

Kreutz sungrazer comet

X/-371 (Aristotle) (Great Comet of 371 BC)
Discovery
- Discovery date: 372–371 BC

Orbital characteristics
- Epoch: 11 January 371 BC (JD 1585560.5)
- Observation arc: ~10 weeks
- Orbit type: Kreutz sungrazers
- Perihelion: 0.0068 AU (1.5 R_{☉})
- Eccentricity: 0.99992
- Orbital period: ~790 years
- Inclination: 141.32°
- Longitude of ascending node: 345.43°
- Argument of periapsis: 68.354°
- Last perihelion: 20 January 371 BC

Physical characteristics
- Mean radius: ~60 km (37 mi)

The Great Comet of 372–371 BC (sometimes Aristotle's Comet) was a comet that was observed by Aristotle, Ephorus, and reported by Callisthenes. While visible from Earth, it was said to have cast shadows at night comparable to a full moon. The Great Comet is thought to possibly be the source of the Kreutz sungrazer family.

== Observations ==
The comet was reported to have had a long, bright tail that had a reddish colour, as well as a nucleus brighter than any star in the night sky. Ephorus reported that it split into two pieces, a larger fragment that is thought to have possibly returned in 1106 AD, as X/1106 C1, and another smaller fragment.

Aristotle wrote in Book 1 of Meteorologica

The great comet, which appeared about the time of the earthquake in Achaea and the tidal wave, rose in the west... The great comet... appeared during winter in clear frosty weather in the west, in the archonship of Asteius: on the first night it was not visible as it set before the sun did, but it was visible on the second, being the least distance behind the sun that would allow it to be seen, and setting immediately. Its light stretched across a third of the sky in a great band, as it were, and so was called a path. It rose as high as Orion’s belt, and there disappeared.

Quoting a lost source, Diodorus Siculus wrote that

[T]here was seen in the heavens during the course of many nights a great blazing torch which was named from its shape a flaming beam...this torch had such brilliancy...and its light such strength that it cast shadows on the earth similar to those cast by the moon.

== Effect on prophecy ==
Diodorus wrote that the comet was believed by some to have foretold the decline of the Spartans, and describes the debate over its nature.

During their term of office, after the Lacedaemonians had held the supremacy in Greece for almost five hundred years, a divine portent foretold the loss of their empire... and a little later, to the surprise of all, the Spartans were defeated in a great battle and irretrievably lost their supremacy. Some of the students of nature ascribed the origin of the torch to natural causes, voicing the opinion that such apparitions occur of necessity at appointed times, and that in these matters the Chaldaeans in Babylon and the other astrologers succeeded in making accurate prophecies. These men, they say, are not surprised when such a phenomenon occurs, but rather if it does not, since each particular constellation has its own peculiar cycle and they complete these cycles through age-long movements in appointed courses.

== Dispute over date ==
The comet is sometimes referred to as occurring during 373-372 BC instead of 372-371 BC. Seneca wrote later that the sightings of the comet coincided with the destruction of Buris and Helice, suggesting a date of 373-372 BC.

In that fire there were many worthy things which should be noted, but nothing more so the fact that when it flashed in the sky the sea immediately covered Buris and Helice.

Most sources refer to it as occurring in 372-371 BC. Göran Henriksson writes:

The content in the text by Diodorus can be accurately dated in two independant [sic] ways to 372/371 BC. The first Olympiad was celebrated after the summer solstice in 776 BC, which gives 372 BC for the one hundred and second Olympiad, and the archonship of Alcisthenes can be dated to the same year from the inscriptions on the Marble Parium. The dating of the text by Aristotle is somewhat more complicated. He dates first the great comet to ”about the time of the earthquake in Achaea”, but later he says more specifically that it appeared ”in the archonship of Asteius”, who according to Diodorus was the archon in the year of the earthquake in Achaea, which from Marble Parium can be fixed to 373/372 BC. The dating by Aristotle of the comet to the archonship of Asteius seems to be approximate, but the dating of the earthquake in Archaea to be exact.

== Relation to other comets ==
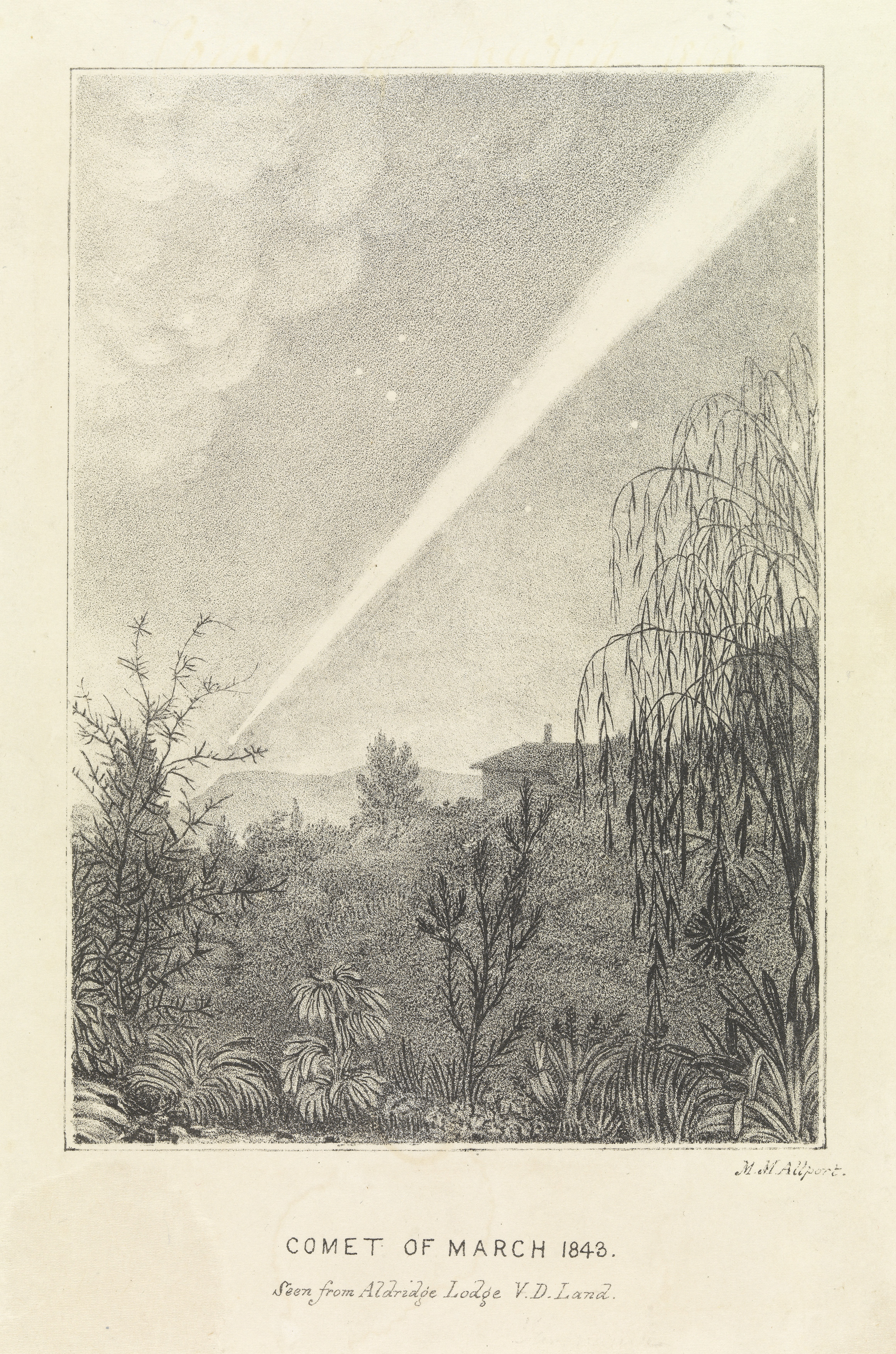
The Great Comet of 1843 was a Kreutz Sungrazer.

Heinrich Kreutz was a German astronomer who claimed that the orbits of several sungrazing comets were related and likely produced when a large Sun-grazing comet fragmented hundreds of years previously. That group, known as the Kreutz Sungrazers, has produced some of the brightest comets ever observed, including X/1106 C1 and Comet Ikeya–Seki. Aristotle's comet may have been the progenitor of the entire group. If it was the source of all Kreutz sungrazers, it must have had a nucleus of at least 120 km (75 mi) in diameter.

It has been speculated that the comet was Comet Encke, although this is not widely accepted.

== Seneca's arguments against Euphorus ==
Based on the ancient Greek belief that comets were the source of celestial objects, Seneca challenged the report of Euphorus.

He asserts that the great comet which, by its rising, sank Helice and Buris, which was carefully watched by the eyes of the whole world since it drew issues of great moment in its train, split up into two stars; but nobody besides him has recorded it. Who, I wonder, could observe the moment at which the comet broke up and was resolved into two parts? And if there is any one who saw it split up into two, how is it that no one saw it first formed out of the two? And why did Ephorus not add the names of the two stars into which it was broken up, since they must have been some of the five planets?

== See also ==
- List of Kreutz Sungrazers
- List of comets
- Heinrich Kreutz
- X/1106 C1
- Meteorology (Aristotle)
- Naturales quaestiones
- Solar and Heliospheric Observatory
