= C/1963 R1 (Pereyra) =

Kreutz sungrazer comet

Comet Pereyra
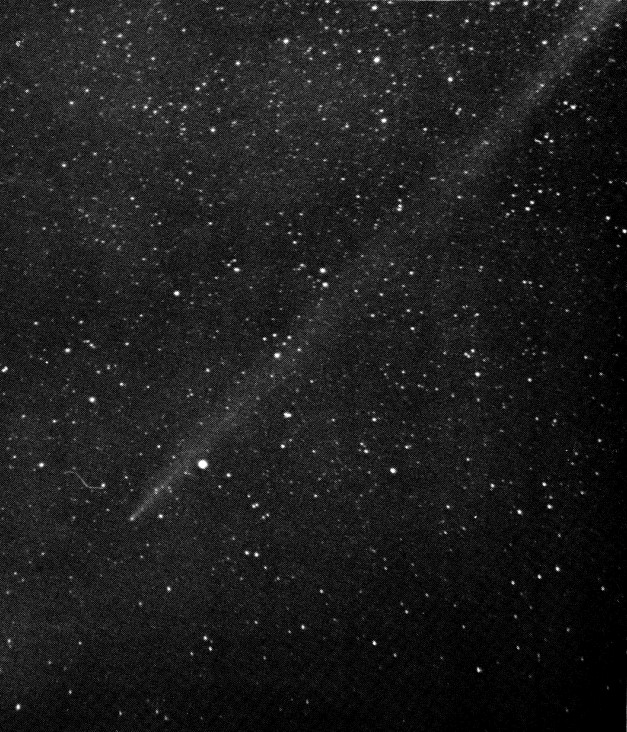
- Comet Pereyra photographed by Charles F. Capen from the Table Mountain Observatory on 23 September 1963.

Discovery
- Discovered by: Zenon M. Pereyra
- Discovery site: Cordoba, Argentina
- Discovery date: 14 September 1963

Designations
- Alternative designations: 1963 V, 1963e

Orbital characteristics
- Epoch: 25 October 1963 (JD 2438327.5)
- Observation arc: 86 days
- Number of observations: 12
- Orbit type: Kreutz sungrazer (Population I)
- Aphelion: 183 AU (inbound); 167 AU (outbound)
- Perihelion: 0.00502 AU (1.08 R_{☉}) (Note: The comet passed 0.00502 AU (1.08 R_{☉}) from the center of the Sun which is (0.08 solar radii×695700 km) = 56,000 km (35,000 mi) from the surface of the Sun.)
- Semi-major axis: 92 AU (inbound); 84 AU (outbound)
- Eccentricity: 0.99949 (inbound); 0.99936 (outbound)
- Orbital period: 875 years (1800); 870 years (1963); 765 years (2200)
- Inclination: 144.59°
- Longitude of ascending node: 8.052°
- Argument of periapsis: 86.231°
- Mean anomaly: 0.070°
- Last perihelion: 23 August 1963
- T_{Jupiter}: –0.015
- Earth MOID: 0.556 AU
- Jupiter MOID: 2.985 AU

Physical characteristics
- Mean radius: 13.7 km (8.5 mi)
- Mass: 3.80×10^{18} kg
- Mean density: 0.35 g/cm^{3} (assumed)
- Comet total magnitude (M1): 5.5
- Comet nuclear magnitude (M2): 14.3

Comet Pereyra (formal designations: C/1963 R1, 1963 V, and 1963e) was a bright comet that appeared in 1963. It was a member of the Kreutz Sungrazers, a group of comets that pass extremely close to the Sun. On 23 August 1963, it passed 56,000 km (35,000 mi) from the Sun's surface.

== Discovery ==
The comet was first seen on 14 September 1963 by Z.M. Pereyra of the Cordoba Observatory in Argentina. British observer George Alcock later reported that he had observed a thin pencil-like beam of light low in the sky on 12 September, which may have been the comet's tail. By 20 September, the comet's position was found near the star Alphard in the constellation Hydra.

It was bright, with an apparent magnitude of 2, and had a short tail about 1 degree long. Over the next few days, the comet faded rapidly, having evidently already passed perihelion, although its tail grew to about 10° in length by late September. During its short period of naked eye visibility, it was widely observed throughout the Southern Hemisphere.

== Orbital studies ==
As the comet receded from the Sun, orbital studies showed that Pereyra had been a sungrazing comet, passing about 56,000 km (35,000 mi) from the Sun's surface. The 5-sigma uncertainty was ±24000 km, (Note: JPL #2 at the JPL SBDB shows a 1-sigma uncertainty of 3.2×10^{−5} AU which is a 1-sigma uncertainty of 4800 km or a 5-sigma uncertainty of 24000 km (5×3.2×10^{−5} AU).) giving a minimum possible approach of about 32000 km. Further analysis demonstrated that it was a member of the Kreutz Sungrazers, a group of comets all descended from one very large sungrazing comet that fragmented several centuries ago.

The Kreutz Sungrazers consist of two major subgroups, which are descended from further breakups of two different fragments of the original comet. Studies have shown that Pereyra is a member of the subgroup that includes the Great Comet of 1843 and the Great Comet of 1882, although the separation of Pereyra from the larger fragment probably occurred one orbit before the two Great Comets separated.

== Sources ==
1. Marsden B.G. (1967), The sungrazing comet group, Astronomical Journal, v. 72, p. 1170
2. Marsden B.G. (1989), The sungrazing comet group. II, Astronomical Journal, v. 98, p. 2306
3. Sekanina Z. (1967), Definitive orbit of Comet Pereyra (1963 V), Bulletin of the Astronomical Institute of Czechoslovakia, v. 18, p.229
