= Luis Baca Elorreaga =

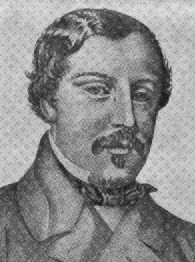
- Baca Elorreaga C. 1850
- Born: 15 December 1826; Victoria de Durango
- Died: 22 March 1853 (aged 26)
- Occupations: Composer, Pianist
- Years active: 1839–1853

Luis Baca Elorreaga (15 December 1826 – 22 March 1853) was an early romantic Mexican composer.

He was the son of the first constitutional governor of the Durango, Santiago Baca Ortiz. His firs music studies began at age seven with Vicente Guardado, choirmaster of the Durango Cathedral.

He was originally sent to Paris to study medicine, but instead began music studies in 1839 at the Paris Conservatory. While living in Paris, he befriended fellow composers Gioacchino Rossini and Gaetano Donizetti. He became the first Mexican opera composer, as well as a pianist. He premiered his opera Ave Maria in 1850 in Paris.

He returned to Mexico in 1852. Shortly after, he returned to Europe in a trip. He would die of appendicitis while on his visit in March 1853. Due to the circumstances of his death not being publicized due to poor trans-atlantic communication, some sources claim his death happened in 1855.

== Notable works ==
- Andad hermosas flores
- Ave Maria
- El cometa de 1843
- Jenny: polka brillante pour le piano
- Juana de Castilla
- Leonor
