= Sungrazing comet =

Comet that is extremely close to the sun during part of its orbit

The representative orbit of a sungrazing comet

A sungrazing comet is a comet that passes extremely close to the Sun at perihelion – sometimes within a few thousand kilometres from the Sun's surface. Although small sungrazers can completely evaporate during such a close approach to the Sun, larger sungrazers can survive many perihelion passages. However, the strong evaporation and tidal forces they experience often lead to their fragmentation.

Up until the 1880s, it was thought that all bright comets near the Sun were the repeated return of a single sungrazing comet. Then German astronomer Heinrich Kreutz and American astronomer Daniel Kirkwood determined that, instead of the return of the same comet, each appearance was a different comet, but each was related to a group of comets that had separated from each other at an earlier passage near the Sun (at perihelion). Very little was known about the population of sungrazing comets until 1979, when coronagraphic observations allowed the detection of sungrazers. As of February 2025, there are 1501 known comets that come within ~12 solar radii (~0.055 AU). This accounts for one third of all comets. Most of these objects vaporize during their close approach, but a comet with a nucleus radius larger than 2–3 km is likely to survive the perihelion passage with a final radius of ~1 km.

Sungrazer comets were some of the earliest observed comets because they can appear very bright. Some are even considered great comets. The close passage of a comet to the Sun brightens the comet not only because of the reflection from the comet nucleus when it is closer to the Sun, but the Sun also vaporizes a large amount of gas from the comet, and the gas reflects more light. This extreme brightening might allow naked-eye observations from Earth, depending on how volatile the gases are and whether the comet is large enough to survive perihelion. These comets provide a useful tool for understanding the composition of comets from the observed outgassing activity. They also offer a way to probe the effects that solar radiation has on other Solar System bodies.

== History of sungrazers ==
=== Pre-19th century ===
One of the first comets to have its orbit computed was the sungrazing comet (and great comet) of 1680, now designated C/1680 V1. It was observed by Isaac Newton, who published the orbit results in 1687. Later, in 1699, Jacques Cassini proposed that comets could have relatively short orbital periods and that C/1680 V1 was the same as a comet observed by Tycho Brahe in 1577, but in 1705 Edmond Halley determined that the difference between the perihelion distances of the two comets was too great for them to be the same object. However, this marked the first time that it was hypothesized that great comets were related or perhaps the same comet. Later, Johann Franz Encke computed the orbit of C/1680 V1 and found a period of approximately 9000 years, leading him to conclude that Cassini's theory of short-period sungrazers was flawed. C/1680 V1 had the smallest measured perihelion distance until the observation in 1826 of comet C/1826 U1.

=== 19th century ===
Advances were made in understanding sungrazing comets in the 19th century with the great comets of 1843, C/1880 C1, and 1882. C/1880 C1 and C/1843 D1 had very similar appearances and also resembled the Great Comet of 1106, therefore Daniel Kirkwood proposed that C/1880 C1 and C/1843 D1 were separate fragments of the same object. He also hypothesized that the parent body was a comet seen by Aristotle and Ephorus in 371 BC because there was a supposed claim that Ephorus witnessed the comet splitting after perihelion.

Comet C/1882 R1 appeared only two years after the previously observed sungrazer, so this convinced astronomers that these bright comets were not all the same object. Some astronomers theorized that the comet might pass through a resisting medium near the Sun, and that would shorten its period. When astronomers observed C/1882 R1, they measured the period before and after perihelion and saw no shortening in the period, which disproved the theory. After perihelion this object was also seen to split into several fragments, and therefore Kirkwood's theory of these comets coming from a parent body seemed like a good explanation.

In an attempt to link the 1843 and 1880 comets to the comet in 1106 and 371 BC, Kreutz measured the fragments of the 1882 comet and determined that it was likely a fragment of the 1106 comet. He then designated that all sungrazing comets with similar orbital characteristics as these few comets would be part of the Kreutz Group.

The 19th century also provided the first spectrum taken of a comet near the Sun, which was taken by Finlay and Elkin in 1882. Later the spectrum was analyzed and Fe and Ni spectral lines were confirmed.

=== 20th century ===
The first sungrazing comet observed in the 20th century was in 1945, and then between 1960 and 1970 five sungrazing comets were seen (C/1961 O1, C/1962 C1, C/1963 R1, C/1965 S1, and C/1970 K1). The 1965 comet (Comet Ikeya–Seki) allowed measurements of spectral emission lines, and several elements were detected, including iron, marking this the first comet since the Great Comet of 1882 to show this feature. Other emission lines, included K, Ca, Ca^{+}, Cr, Co, Mn, Ni, Cu, and V. Comet Ikeya–Seki also led to separating the Kreutz sungrazers into two subgroups by Brian Marsden in 1967. One subgroup appears to have the 1106 comet as the parent body, and members are fragments of that comet, while the other group have similar dynamics but no confirmed parent body associated with it.

==== Coronagraphic observations ====
The 20th century greatly impacted sungrazing comet research with the launch of coronagraphic telescopes, including Solwind, SMM, and SOHO. Until this point, sungrazing comets were only seen with the naked eye, but with the coronagraphic telescopes many sungrazers were observed that were much smaller, and very few have survived perihelion passage. The comets observed by Solwind and SMM from 1981 to 1989 had visual magnitudes from about −2.5 to +6, which is much fainter than Comet Ikeya–Seki with a visual magnitude of about −10.

In 1987 and 1988 it was first observed by SMM that there could be pairs of sungrazing comets that can appear within very short time periods, ranging from a half of a day up to about two weeks. Calculations were made to determine that the pairs were part of the same parent body but broke apart at tens of AU from the Sun. The breakup velocities were only on the order of a few meters per second, which is comparable to the speed of rotation for these comets. This led to the conclusion that these comets break from tidal forces and that comets C/1882 R1, C/1965 S1, and C/1963 R1 probably broke off from the Great Comet of 1106.

Coronagraphs allowed measuring the properties of the comet as it reached very close to the Sun. It was noted that sungrazing comets tend to peak in brightness at a distance of about 12.3 or 11.2 solar radii. It is thought that this variation stems from a difference in dust composition. Another small peak in brightness has been found at about 7 solar radii from the Sun and is possibly due to a fragmentation of the comet nucleus. An alternative explanation is that the brightness peak at 12 solar radii comes from the sublimation of amorphous olivines, and the peak at 11.2 solar radii is from the sublimation of crystalline olivines. The peak at 7 solar radii could then be the sublimation of pyroxene.

== Sungrazing groups ==
=== Kreutz sungrazers ===
The most famous sungrazers are the Kreutz sungrazers, which all originate from one giant comet that broke up into many smaller comets during its first passage through the inner Solar System. An extremely bright comet seen by Aristotle and Ephorus in 371 BC is a possible candidate for this parent comet.

The Great Comets of 1843 and 1882, Comet Ikeya–Seki in 1965 and C/2011 W3 (Lovejoy) in 2011 were all fragments of the original comet. Each of these four was briefly bright enough to be visible in the daytime sky, next to the Sun, 1882's comet outshining even the full moon.

In 1979, C/1979 Q1 (Solwind) was the first sungrazer to be spotted by US satellite P78-1, in coronagraphs taken on 30 and 31 August 1979.

Apart from Comet Lovejoy, none of the sungrazers seen by SOHO has survived its perihelion passage; some may have plunged into the Sun itself, but most are likely to have simply evaporated away completely.

=== Other sungrazers ===
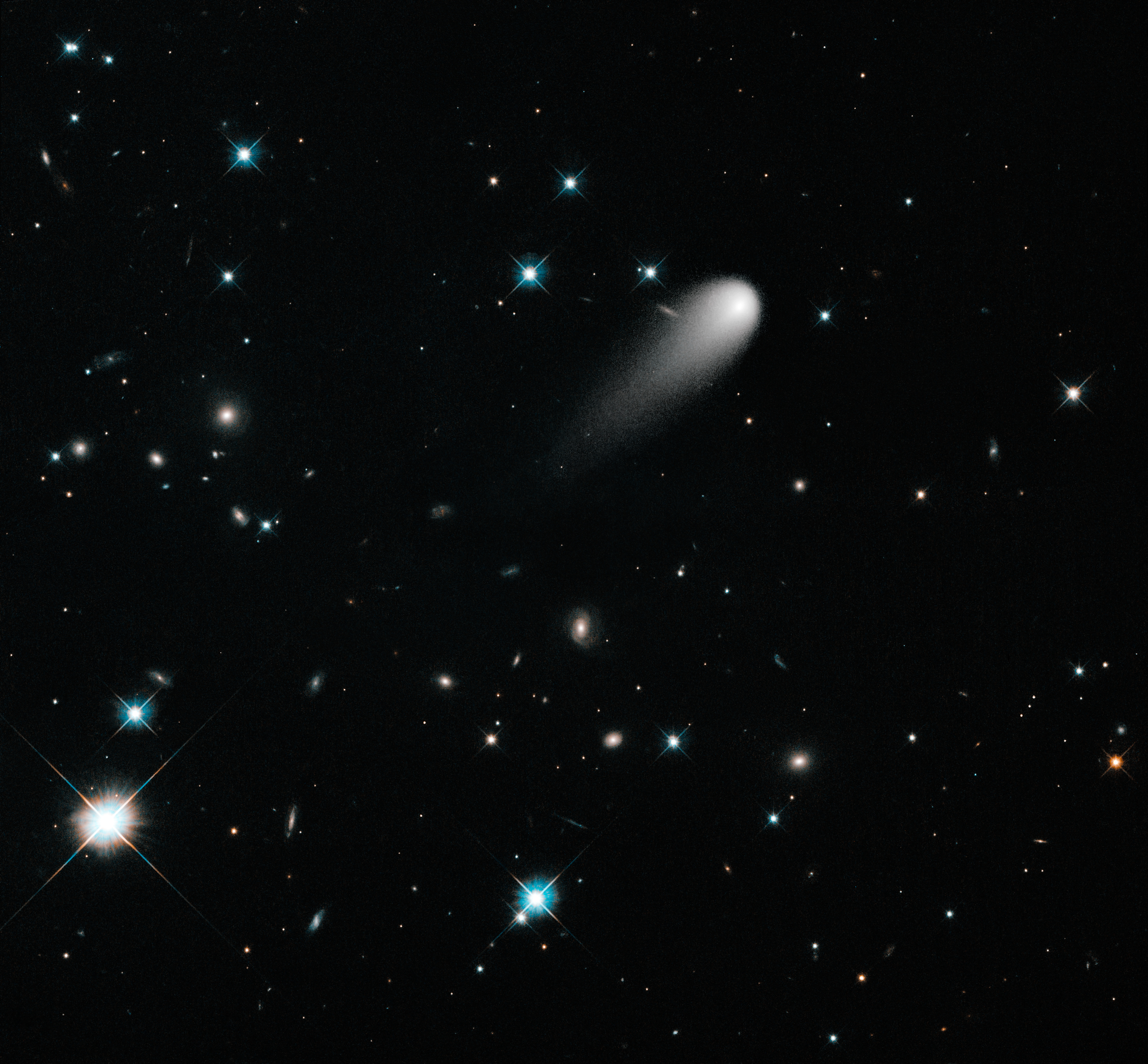
Comet ISON taken with the Wide Field Camera 3 on April 30, 2013

About 83% of the sungrazers observed with SOHO are members of the Kreutz group. The other 17% contains some sporadic sungrazers, but three other related groups of comets have been identified among them: the Kracht, Marsden and Meyer groups. The Marsden and Kracht groups both appear to be related to comet 96P/Machholz. These comets have also been linked to several meteor streams, including the daytime Arietids, the delta Aquariids, and the Quadrantids. Linked comet orbits suggest that both Marsden and Kracht groups have a small period, on the order of five years, but the Meyer group may have intermediate- or long-period orbits. The Meyer group comets are typically small, faint, and never have tails. The Great Comet of 1680 was a sungrazer, and while used by Newton to verify Kepler's equations on orbital motion, it was not a member of any larger groups. However, comet C/2012 S1 (ISON), which disintegrated shortly before perihelion, had orbital elements similar to the Great Comet of 1680 and could be a second member of the group.

== Origin of sungrazing comets ==
Studies show that for comets with high orbital inclinations and perihelion distances of less than about 2 astronomical units, the cumulative effect of gravitational perturbations over many orbits is adequate to reduce the perihelion distance to very small values. One study has suggested that Comet Hale–Bopp has about a 15% chance of eventually becoming a sungrazer.

== Types of near-Sun comets ==
Sunskirters are objects "that pass within 33 solar radii of the Sun's centre, equal to half of Mercury's perihelion distance", while sungrazers are objects that reach perihelion within 3.45 solar radii (the fluid Roche limit). Sundivers are defined as comets with orbits that intersect the solar photosphere.

== Role in solar astronomy ==
The motion of tails of sungrazers that survive perihelion (such as Comet Lovejoy) can provide solar astronomers with information about the structure of the solar corona, particularly the detailed magnetic structure.

== See also ==
- Helion (meteoroid)
- Parker Solar Probe
