= C/1970 K1 (White–Ortiz–Bolelli) =

Kreutz sungrazer comet

Discovery
- Discovered by: Graeme White; Emilio Ortiz; Carlos Bolelli
- Discovery date: 18 May 1970

Designations
- Alternative designations: 1970 VI, 1970f

Orbital characteristics
- Epoch: 29 May 1970 (JD 2440735.5)
- Observation arc: 14 days (short arc)
- Earliest precovery date: 16 May 1970
- Number of observations: 9 (small sample size)
- Orbit type: Kreutz sungrazer
- Aphelion: 348±1700 AU
- Perihelion: 0.00884 AU (1.90 R_{☉})
- Semi-major axis: 173±900 AU
- Eccentricity: 0.9999±0.0003
- Orbital period: 2300±16000 years 1911 years (inbound)
- Inclination: 138.95°±0.09°
- Longitude of ascending node: 336.82°±0.19°
- Argument of periapsis: 61.10°±0.05°
- Last perihelion: 14 May 1970
- T_{Jupiter}: –0.058
- Earth MOID: 0.49 AU
- Jupiter MOID: 2.85 AU

Physical characteristics
- Mean radius: 1.1 km (0.68 mi)
- Mass: 2.10×10^{15} kg
- Mean density: 0.35 g/cm^{3} (assumed)
- Apparent magnitude: 1.0 (1970 apparition)

Comet White–Ortiz–Bolelli (formal designations: C/1970 K1, 1970 VI, and 1970f) was a bright comet which appeared in 1970. It was a member of the Kreutz sungrazers, a family of comets which resulted from the break-up of a large parent comet several centuries ago. It was already easily visible to the naked eye when first discovered, and reached a maximum apparent magnitude of +1 (about as bright as planet Saturn).

== Discovery ==
Approximate relationship of the largest members of the Kreutz Sungrazers. Note that the perihelion passage at which fragmentations occurred may not be well established

Comet White–Ortiz–Bolelli was discovered on May 18 by Graeme White, an Australian amateur astronomer in Wollongong, New South Wales. He sighted the comet in binoculars shortly after sunset, and described it as having a star-like head at apparent magnitude 1-2, and a short tail about 1 degree long. He spotted it again on May 20 by naked eye as well as binoculars, and by this time the tail had grown to 10° in length.

The second independent discovery was made on May 21 by Air France pilot Emilio Ortiz, from a location about 400 km east of Madagascar. Ortiz saw the comet from his cockpit, and reported a magnitude of 0.5 to 1.0 and a tail about 5–8° long. A few hours later, Carlos Bolelli, a technician at the Cerro Tololo Inter-American Observatory in Chile became the third independent discoverer of the comet, although he saw only the tail, as the head was beneath the horizon.

== Subsequent observations ==
Numerous independent discoveries were made in the days immediately following the comet's discovery, including South African astronomer, N. B. Dumas, who saw the comet on 20 May 1970. However, the astronomical naming conventions only allowed the comet to be given the names of the first three. All sightings of the comet were made from the Southern Hemisphere, due to the orientation of its orbit with respect to the Earth.

Throughout the comet's brief appearance, it could only be seen low in the sky for a short time after sunset, but it was most easily visible on May 24. After that it faded rapidly, and by 1 June it had already faded to below naked-eye visibility. The last definite detection of the comet was made on June 7, when it appeared as a faint, ill-defined nebulosity. Increasing moonlight and the comet's decreasing brightness prevented any further visual sightings of the comet.

== Orbit ==
The comet's sudden appearance very close to the Sun and rapid subsequent decline in brightness both pointed to it being a sungrazing comet, and calculations of its orbit by Brian G. Marsden backed this suggestion. Marsden showed that the comet had reached perihelion (closest approach to the Sun) on May 14, at a distance of just 0.0088 AU (1.32 million km), or 2 solar radii.

The calculated orbit pinned down White-Ortiz-Bolelli as a member of the Kreutz sungrazers, a group of comets which all originate from the fragmentation of one giant parent comet several hundred years ago, and which has provided some of the brightest comets ever seen. Kreutz Sungrazers all travel on similar orbits, which result in them being most easily visible from the southern hemisphere, between August and April. Kreutz sungrazers appearing between May and July may come and go unseen, as they approach from directly behind the Sun as seen from Earth; the only previous Kreutz Sungrazer seen during these months was the Eclipse Comet of 1882, which was only observed once, during a total solar eclipse.

Before White–Ortiz–Bolelli, studies had divided the Kreutz Sungrazers into two sub-groups, originating from fragmentations at different orbits, but White-Ortiz-Bolelli seemed to be a member of neither. Studies showed that it probably broke away from the comet that spawned Subgroup II, before the main fragmentation, and it was classed as the first (and so far only) member of Subgroup IIa.

Having an observation arc of only 14 days, the long-term trajectory of the comet is poorly constrained. The orbital period is basically unknown but assumed to be a few thousand years with an orbital inclination of 139 degrees.

== See also ==
- List of Kreutz sungrazers
  - C/2026 A1 (MAPS), another extremely long-period Kreutz comet
