= Kreutz sungrazer =

Family of comets

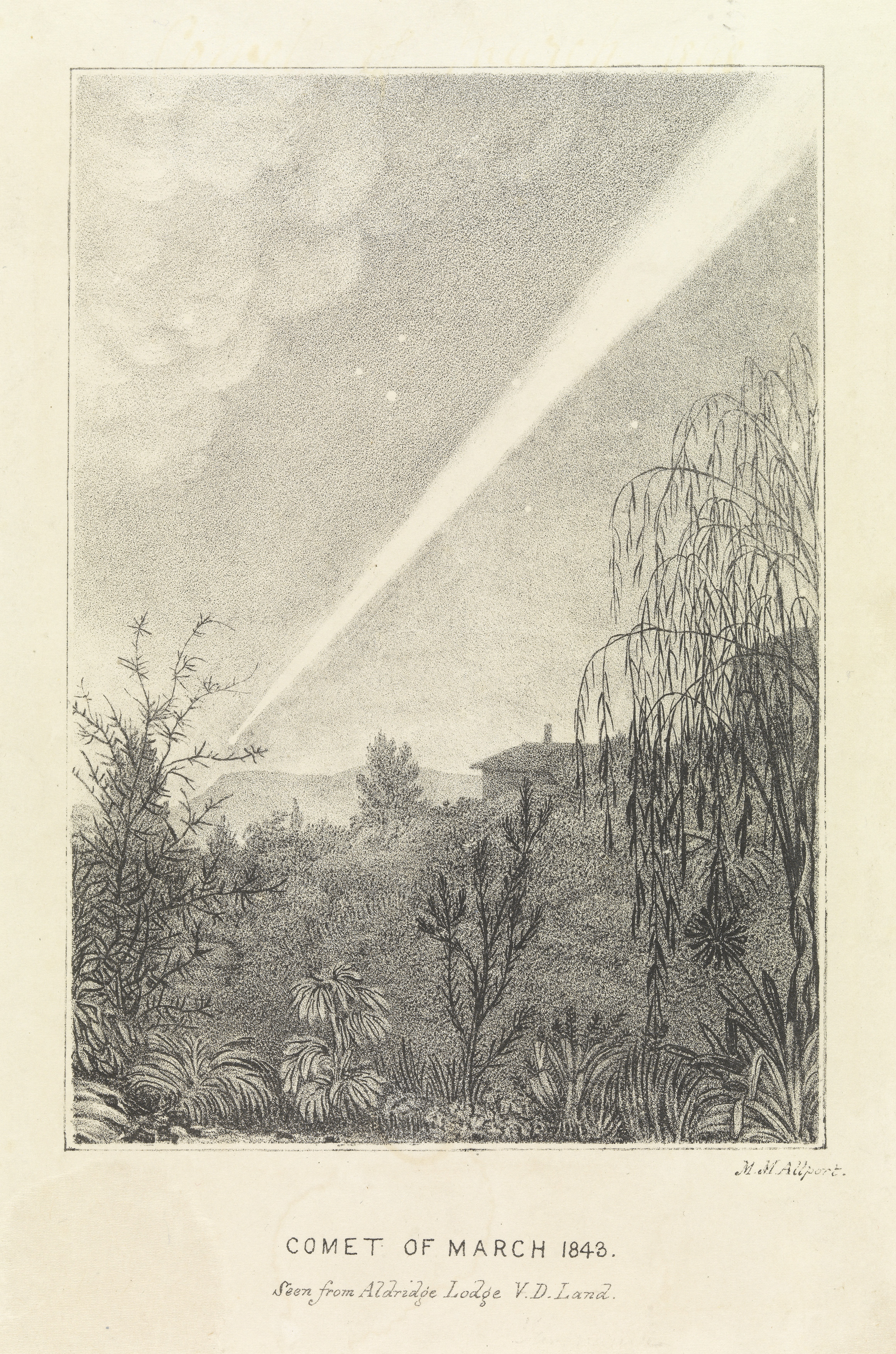
An illustration of the sungrazing Great Comet of 1843, as seen from Tasmania

The Kreutz sungrazers (/krɔɪts/ KROYTS) are a family of sungrazing comets, characterized by orbits taking them extremely close to the Sun at perihelion. At the far extreme of their orbits, aphelion, Kreutz sungrazers can be a hundred times farther from the Sun than the Earth is, while their distance of closest approach can be less than twice the Sun's radius. They are believed to be fragments of one large comet that broke up several centuries ago and are named for German astronomer Heinrich Kreutz, who first demonstrated that they were related. These sungrazers make their way from the distant outer Solar System to the inner Solar System, to their perihelion point near the Sun, and then leave the inner Solar System in their return trip to their aphelion.

Several members of the Kreutz family have become great comets, occasionally visible near the Sun in the daytime sky. The most recent of these was Comet Ikeya–Seki in 1965, which may have been one of the brightest comets in the last millennium. It has been suggested that another cluster of bright Kreutz system comets may begin to arrive in the inner Solar System in the next few decades.

More than 5,000 members of the family have been discovered since the launch of the SOHO satellite in 1995. None of these smaller comets have survived their perihelion passage. Larger sungrazers such as the Great Comet of 1843 and C/2011 W3 (Lovejoy) have survived their perihelion passage. Amateur astronomers have been successful at discovering Kreutz comets in the data available in real time via the internet. Two of the most recent Kreutz comets include C/2026 A1 (MAPS) that came to perihelion on 4 April 2026 and C/2024 S1 (ATLAS) that disintegrated in October 2024.

== Discovery and historical observations ==
The first comet whose orbit was recognized to take it extremely close to the Sun was the Great Comet of 1680. This comet was found to have passed about 235,000 kilometres (146,000 mi) above the Sun's surface, equivalent to around a sixth of Sun's diameter, or about half the distance between the Earth and the Moon. (Note: C/1680 V1 passed about 0.00622 AU (930,500 km) from the center of the Sun: 930500 km – Sun's radius of 695700 km = 234,800 km (145,900 mi) from the surface of the Sun.) The Great Southern Comet of 1887 passed about 27,000 km (17,000 mi) from the surface of the Sun. (Note: The Great Southern Comet of 1887 passed about 0.00483 AU (722,600 km) from the center of the Sun: 722600 km – Sun's radius of 695700 km = 27,000 km (17,000 mi) from the surface of the Sun.)

Astronomers at the time, including Edmond Halley, speculated that the Great Comet of 1680 was a return of a bright comet seen close to the Sun in the sky in 1106. 163 years later, the Great Comet of 1843 appeared and also passed extremely close to the Sun. Despite orbital calculations showing that it had a period of several centuries, some astronomers wondered if it was a return of the 1680 comet. A bright comet seen in 1880 was found to be traveling on an almost identical orbit to that of 1843, as was the subsequent Great Comet of 1882. Some astronomers suggested that perhaps they were all one comet, whose orbital period was somehow being drastically shortened at each perihelion passage, perhaps by retardation by some dense material surrounding the Sun.

An alternative suggestion was that the comets were all fragments of an earlier Sun-grazing comet. This idea was first proposed in 1880, and its plausibility was amply demonstrated when the Great Comet of 1882 broke up into several fragments after its perihelion passage. In 1888, Heinrich Kreutz published a paper showing that the comets of 1843 (C/1843 D1, the Great March Comet), 1880 (C/1880 C1, the Great Southern Comet), and 1882 (C/1882 R1, Great September Comet) were probably fragments of a giant comet that had broken up several orbits before. The comet of 1680 proved to be unrelated to this family of comets. It was a sungrazer, but not a member of the Kreutz group.

After another Kreutz sungrazer was seen in 1887 (C/1887 B1, the Great Southern Comet of 1887), the next one did not appear until 1945. Two further sungrazers appeared in the 1960s, Comet Pereyra in 1963 and Comet Ikeya–Seki, which became extremely bright in 1965, and broke into three pieces after its perihelion. It is probably the most famous among the Kreutz sungrazers. The appearance of two Kreutz sungrazers in quick succession inspired further study of the dynamics of the group. Initially, the name "sungrazer" was applied exclusively to the Kreutz group.

=== Physical traits ===
Most sungrazing comets are part of the Kreutz family. The group generally has an eccentricity approaching 1, orbital inclination of 139–144° (precluding close encounters with planets), a perihelion distance of less than 0.01 AU (less than the diameter of the Sun), an aphelion distance of about 100 AU (15 billion km) and an orbital period of about 500–1,000 years. Erosion of the comets by solar energy during close passages leads to progressive changes in their orbits.

Most Kreutz sungrazers have radii of less than 100 metres (330 ft), but the brightest ones reach radii of 1–10 kilometres (0.62–6.21 mi). The bodies themselves have irregular shapes and appearances which have been described as diffuse, star-like or tailed. The material that makes up their cometary nuclei has a low tensile strength. They have only low concentrations of volatiles and thus become active only close to the Sun, since they have lost most of their volatiles during earlier transits. Their brightness may peak shortly before perihelion at 10–15 solar radii, after which they become dimmer. This may be due to the evaporation of minerals like olivine and pyroxene. Other studies find a more chaotic pattern of brightening and darkening. The water and organic materials of a comet evaporate first, exposing fluffy aggregations of olivines that form dust tails. Dust from these comets remains in the solar corona, where it interacts with the Sun's magnetic field.

== Notable members ==
The brightest members of the Kreutz sungrazers have been spectacular, easily visible in the daytime sky. The three most impressive have been the Great Comet of 1843, the Great Comet of 1882 and X/1106 C1. The progenitor of all Kreutz sungrazers observed to date may be the Great Comet of 371 BC, or comets seen in 214 BC, 423 AD or 467 AD. Another notable Kreutz sungrazer was the Eclipse Comet of 1882. Other candidate Kreutz sungrazers are comets observed in 582 AD in China and Europe, X/1381 V1 which was seen from Japan, Korea, Russia and Egypt, two comets seen in 1668 and 1695, C/1880 C1, the Great Southern Comet of 1887, C/1945 X1 (du Toit), C/1970 K1 and C/2005 S1, one of the best-observed Kreutz sungrazers.

=== Great Comet of 371 BC ===
The Great Comet seen in the winter of 372–371 BC was an extremely bright comet thought to be the progenitor of the entire Kreutz sungrazer family. It was observed by Aristotle and Ephorus during the period in which it was visible to the naked eye. It was reported to have had an extremely long, extremely bright, prominent tail with a reddish colour, as well as a nucleus brighter than any star in the night sky.

=== Great Comet of 1106 AD ===
The Great Comet of 1106 AD was a gigantic comet noticed by observers from all over the world. On 2 February 1106 AD, a star was reported to have appeared next to the Sun, about a degree from it. It seems to have diminished in brightness after this apparition, with a rather faint, unremarkable nucleus after perihelion, but its tail grew enormously and on February 7 Japanese observers said the extremely bright white tail stretched about 100 degrees across the night sky, which was also reported to have been branching into multiple tails. On February 9, it dimmed slightly, but its tail was still exceedingly bright, measuring 60 degrees long and 3 degrees across. The entire naked-eye duration of the giant comet has been recorded to be anywhere from 15 to 70 days in European texts, though. Recent evaluations, as well as observations of the comet splitting into multiple pieces after perihelion, have suggested that this comet was the progenitor of an entire subgroup of Kreutz sungrazers, including the extremely bright sungrazers of 1882, 1843 and 1965. Observations also suggest that the larger fragment of the Great Comet of 371 BC later returned as the Great Comet of 1106 AD.

=== Great Comet of 1843 ===
The Great Comet of 1843 was first noticed in early February of that year, just over three weeks before its perihelion passage when it passed about 830,000 km (520,000 mi) from the surface of the Sun. By February 27 it was easily visible in the daytime sky, and observers described seeing a tail 2–3° long stretching away from the Sun before being lost in the glare of the sky. After its perihelion passage, it reappeared in the morning sky, and developed an extremely long tail. It extended about 45° across the sky on March 11 and was more than 2° wide; the tail was calculated to be more than 300 million km (2.0 AU) long. This held the record for the longest measured cometary tail until 2000, when Comet Hyakutake's tail was found to stretch to some 550 million km (3.7 AU) in length. The maximum apparent magnitude attained by this comet was −10.

The comet was very prominent throughout early March, before fading away to almost below naked eye visibility by the beginning of April. It was last detected on April 20. This comet apparently made a substantial impression on the public, inspiring in some a fear that judgement day was imminent.

=== Eclipse Comet of 1882 ===
A party of observers gathered in Egypt to watch a solar eclipse in May 1882 also observed a bright streak near the Sun once totality began. The streak was the perihelion passage of a Kreutz comet, and its sighting during the eclipse was the only observation of it. Photographs of the eclipse revealed that the comet had moved noticeably during the 1m50s eclipse, as would be expected for a comet racing past the Sun at almost 500 km/s. The comet is sometimes referred to as Tewfik, after Tewfik Pasha, the Khedive of Egypt at the time.

=== Great Comet of 1882 ===
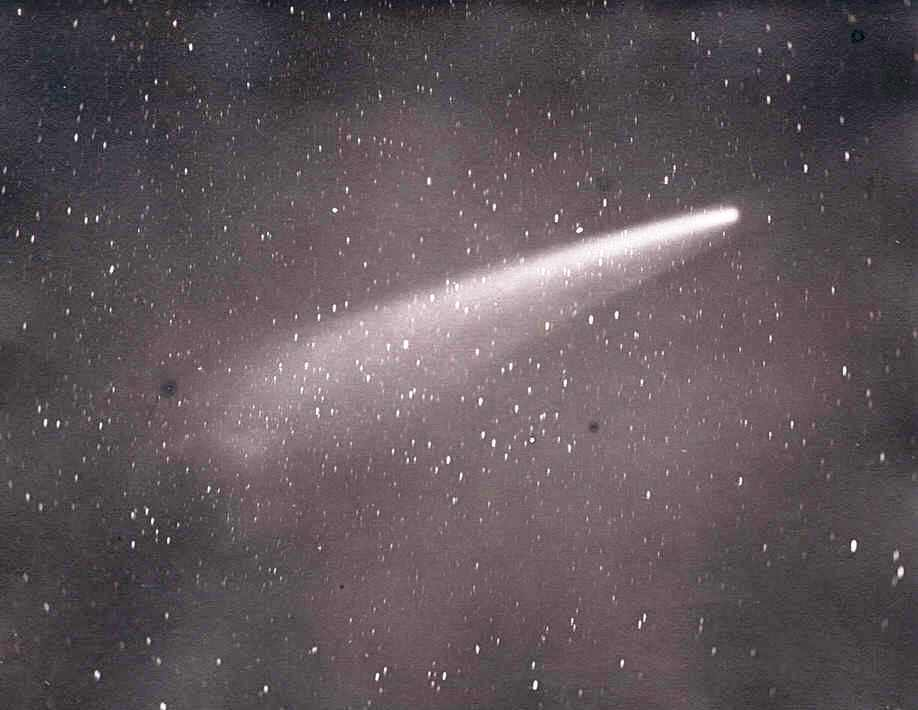
Photograph of the Great Comet of 1882, as seen from South Africa

The Great Comet of 1882 was discovered independently by many observers, as it was already easily visible to the naked eye when it appeared in early September 1882, just a few days before perihelion, at which it reached an apparent magnitude estimated to have been −17, by far the brightest recorded for any comet and exceeding the brightness of the full moon by a factor of 57. It grew rapidly brighter and was eventually so bright it was visible in the daytime for two days (16–17 September), even through light cloud.

After its perihelion passage, the comet remained bright for several weeks. During October, its nucleus was seen to fragment into first two and then four pieces. Some observers also reported seeing diffuse patches of light several degrees away from the nucleus. The rate of separation of the fragments of the nucleus was such that they will return about a century apart, between 670 and 960 years after the break-up.

=== Comet Ikeya–Seki ===
Comet Ikeya–Seki is the most recent very bright Kreutz sungrazer. It was discovered independently by two Japanese amateur astronomers on September 18, 1965, within 15 minutes of each other, and quickly recognised as a Kreutz sungrazer. It brightened rapidly over the following four weeks as it approached the Sun, and reached apparent magnitude 2 by October 15. Its perihelion passage occurred on October 21, and observers across the world easily saw it in the daytime sky. A few hours before perihelion passage on October 21 it had a visible magnitude from −10 to −11, comparable to the first quarter of the Moon and brighter than any other comet seen since 1882. A day after perihelion its magnitude decreased to just −4.

Japanese astronomers used a coronagraph to observe how the comet broke into three pieces 30 minutes before perihelion. When the comet reappeared in the morning sky in early November, two of these nuclei were definitely detected with the third suspected. The comet developed a very prominent tail, about 25° in length, before fading throughout November. It was last detected in January 1966.

== Dynamical history and evolution ==
Approximate relationship of the largest members of the Kreutz sungrazers. The perihelion passage at which fragmentations occurred may not be well established

A study by Brian G. Marsden in 1967 was the first attempt to trace back the orbital history of the group to identify the progenitor comet. All known members of the group up until 1965 had almost identical orbital inclinations at about 144°, as well as very similar values for the longitude of perihelion at 280–282°, with a couple of outlying points probably due to uncertain orbital calculations. A greater range of values existed for the argument of perihelion and longitude of the ascending node.

Marsden found that the Kreutz sungrazers could be split into two groups, with slightly different orbital elements, implying that the family resulted from fragmentations at more than one perihelion. Tracing back the orbits of Ikeya–Seki and the Great Comet of 1882, Marsden found that at their previous perihelion passage, the difference between their orbital elements was of the same order of magnitude as the difference between the elements of the fragments of Ikeya–Seki after it broke up. This meant it was realistic to presume that they were two parts of the same comet which had broken up one orbit ago. The best candidate for the progenitor comet was the Great Comet of 1106: Ikeya–Seki's derived orbital period indicated that its previous perihelion matched that of 1106, and while the Great Comet of 1882's derived orbit implied a previous perihelion a few decades later, it would only require a small change in the orbital elements to bring it into agreement.

The Sun-grazing comets of 1668, 1689, 1702 and 1945 seem to be closely related to those of 1882 and 1965, although their orbits are not well enough determined to establish whether they broke off from the parent comet in 1106, or the previous perihelion passage before that, some time in the 3–5th centuries AD. This subgroup of comets is known as Subgroup II. Comet White–Ortiz–Bolelli, which was seen in 1970, is more closely related to this group than Subgroup I, but appears to have broken off during the previous orbit to the other fragments.

The Sun-grazing comets observed in 1843 (Great Comet of 1843) and 1963 (Comet Pereyra) seem to be closely related and belong to the subgroup I, although when their orbits are traced back to one previous perihelion, the differences between the orbital elements are still rather large, probably implying that they broke apart from each other one revolution before that. They may not be related to the comet of 1106, but rather a comet that returned about 50 years before that. Subgroup I also includes comets seen in 1695, 1880 (Great Southern Comet of 1880) and in 1887 (Great Southern Comet of 1887), as well as the vast majority of comets detected by the SOHO mission (see below).

The distinction between the two sub-groups is thought to imply that they result from two separate parent comets, which themselves were once part of a 'grandparent' comet which fragmented several orbits previously. One possible candidate for the grandparent is a comet observed by Aristotle and Ephorus in 371 BC. Ephorus claimed to have seen this comet break into two. However modern astronomers are skeptical of the claims of Ephorus, because they were not confirmed by other sources. Instead comets that arrived between 3rd and 5th centuries AD (comets of 214, 426 and 467) are considered as possible progenitors of the Kreutz family. The original comet must certainly have been very large indeed, perhaps as large as 100 km (62 mi) across although a size of only a few tens of kilometres, akin to Comet Hale–Bopp, is also possible. One study suggests that the progenitor's orbit changed in a two-step process beginning in the Oort cloud: first, being perturbed into an ellipse whose semimajor axis was about 100 AU, and second, evolving into a sungrazing orbit via the Kozai mechanism.

Although its orbit is rather different from those of the main two groups, it is possible that the comet of 1680 is also related to the Kreutz sungrazers via a fragmentation many orbits ago.

The Kreutz sungrazers are probably not a unique phenomenon. Other families of sungrazing comets that formed from the breakup of a parent body are the Meyer sungrazers, the Marsden sunskirters and the Kracht sunskirters. These form the 'non-Kreutz' or 'sporadic' sungrazers. The Kreutz, Marsden and Kracht families and the comet 96P/Machholz may in turn form a larger family, the Machholz interplanetary complex, that may have formed through the breakup of a parent body before 950 CE. The ultimate origin of the Kreutz sungrazers is probably the Oort cloud, with unknown physical processes reducing the semi-major axis until a sungrazing comet resulted. This process may occur a few times every million years, which may either be an underestimate or may indicate that humanity is lucky that such a Kreutz sungrazer family exists just now. Studies have shown that for comets with high orbital inclinations and perihelion distances of less than about 2 AU (300 million km), the cumulative effect of gravitational perturbations tends to result in sungrazing orbits. One study has estimated that Comet Hale–Bopp has about a 15% chance of eventually becoming a Sun-grazing comet. Comet families resembling the Kreutz group have been detected around the star Beta Pictoris.

== Recent observations ==
Until recently, a very bright member of the Kreutz sungrazers could pass through the inner Solar System unnoticed if its perihelion had occurred between about May and August. At this time of year, as seen from Earth, the comet would approach and recede almost directly behind the Sun and could only become visible extremely close to the Sun if it became very bright. Only a remarkable coincidence between the perihelion passage of the Eclipse Comet of 1882 and a total solar eclipse allowed its discovery.

During the 1980s, two Sun-observing satellites serendipitously discovered several new members of the Kreutz family. Since the launch of the SOHO Sun-observing satellite in 1995, it has been possible to observe comets very close to the Sun at any time of year. The satellite provides a constant view of the immediate solar vicinity, and SOHO has now discovered hundreds of new Sun-grazing comets, some just a few metres across. About 83% of the sungrazers found by SOHO are members of the Kreutz group, with the others including the Meyer, Marsden, and Kracht1&2 families. New Kreutz sungrazers are discovered roughly once every three days, while many are likely going unobserved. Their frequency increased from 1997–2002 to 2003–2008. They probably have radii of only a few dozens of metres. Apart from Comet Lovejoy, none of the sungrazers seen by SOHO has survived its perihelion passage; some may have plunged into the Sun itself, but most are likely to have simply evaporated away completely. Centrifugal breakup is another important process that destroys smaller Kreutz sungrazers, and may explain the delayed breakup of some Kreutz comets long after they passed through perihelion and are moving away from the Sun.

As of June 2020, 85% or about 3,400 of the 4,000 comets that have been identified using SOHO data, mostly by amateur astronomers analysing SOHO's observations via the Internet, were Kreutz sungrazers. As of February 2024, NASA's JPL Small-Body Database lists about 1,300 Kreutz sungrazers.

Sungrazers frequently arrive in pairs or triplets separated by a few hours. These pairs are too frequent to occur by chance, and cannot be due to break-ups on the previous orbit, because the fragments would have separated by a much greater distance. Instead, it is thought that the pairs result from fragmentations far away from the perihelion. Many comets have been observed to fragment far from perihelion, and it seems that in the case of the Kreutz sungrazers, an initial fragmentation near perihelion can be followed by an ongoing 'cascade' of break-ups throughout the rest of the orbit.

There are minor differences between Subgroup I and Subgroup II Kreutz sungrazers; the former come slightly closer to the Sun and the ascending nodes differ by about 20°. The number of Subgroup I Kreutz comets discovered is about nine to four times the number of Subgroup II members. This suggests that the 'grandparent' comet split into parent comets of unequal size.

== Future ==
Dynamically, the Kreutz sungrazers might continue to be recognised as a distinct family for many thousands of years. Eventually, their orbits will be dispersed by gravitational perturbations, although depending on the rate of fragmentation of the constituent parts, the group might be completely destroyed before it is gravitationally dispersed. During 2002–2017, the occurrence of Kreutz sungrazers remained largely constant.

It is not possible to estimate the chances of another very bright Kreutz comet arriving in the near future, but given that at least 10 have reached naked-eye visibility over the last 200 years, another great comet from the Kreutz family seems almost certain to arrive at some point. Comet White–Ortiz–Bolelli in 1970 reached an apparent magnitude of 1. In December 2011, Kreutz sungrazer C/2011 W3 (Lovejoy) survived its perihelion passage for some time and had an apparent magnitude of −3. This comet is probably not the herald of another arrival of bright Kreutz sungrazers.

In 2024, comet C/2024 S1 (ATLAS) became the second Kreutz comet discovered by ground observations in the 21st century after Lovejoy, however it turned out to be a small comet that eventually disintegrated upon perihelion. Another potentially large Kreutz comet, C/2026 A1 (MAPS), surpassed Ikeya–Seki as the earliest Kreutz comet ever discovered before perihelion, allowing astronomers nearly three months of observation and study, with an extremely long orbital period suggesting that it may be a second-generation fragment that was among the daylight comets last seen by Ammianus Marcellinus in 363 AD.

== See also ==
- List of Kreutz sungrazers
- Lists of comets

== Bibliography ==
- Battams, Karl; Knight, Matthew M. (13 July 2017). "SOHO comets: 20 years and 3000 objects later". Philosophical Transactions of the Royal Society A: Mathematical, Physical and Engineering Sciences. 375 (2097) 20160257. arXiv:1611.02279. Bibcode:2017RSPTA.37560257B. doi:10.1098/rsta.2016.0257. ISSN 1364-503X. PMC 5454226. PMID 28554977.
- Fernández, Julio A; Lemos, Pablo; Gallardo, Tabaré (28 September 2021). "On the origin of the Kreutz family of sungrazing comets". Monthly Notices of the Royal Astronomical Society. 508 (1): 789–802. doi:10.1093/mnras/stab2562. ISSN 0035-8711.
- Jones, Geraint H.; Knight, Matthew M.; Battams, Karl; Boice, Daniel C.; Brown, John; Giordano, Silvio; Raymond, John; Snodgrass, Colin; Steckloff, Jordan K.; Weissman, Paul; Fitzsimmons, Alan; Lisse, Carey; Opitom, Cyrielle; Birkett, Kimberley S.; Bzowski, Maciej (February 2018). "The Science of Sungrazers, Sunskirters, and Other Near-Sun Comets". Space Science Reviews. 214 (1) 20: 20. Bibcode:2018SSRv..214...20J. doi:10.1007/s11214-017-0446-5. hdl:10037/13638. ISSN 0038-6308.
- Seargent, David A. J. (2017). Weird Comets and Asteroids. Astronomers' Universe. Cham: Springer International Publishing. doi:10.1007/978-3-319-56558-3. ISBN 978-3-319-56557-6.
- Thomas, Nicolas (2020). An Introduction to Comets: Post-Rosetta Perspectives. Astronomy and Astrophysics Library. Cham: Springer International Publishing. Bibcode:2020icpr.book.....T. doi:10.1007/978-3-030-50574-5. ISBN 978-3-030-50573-8. S2CID 242251125.
