= X/1106 C1 =

Great Comet of 1106

X/1106 C1 (Great Comet of 1106)
Discovery
- Discovery date: 2–16 February 1106

Orbital characteristics
- Epoch: 26 February 1106 (JD 2125080.5)
- Observation arc: 15–70 days
- Orbit type: Kreutz sungrazer
- Perihelion: 0.005 AU (1.1 R_{☉})
- Eccentricity: 0.99994
- Orbital period: ~748.04 years
- Inclination: 144.54°
- Longitude of ascending node: 5.8213°
- Argument of periapsis: 84.689°
- Last perihelion: 26 January 1106
- Next perihelion: 27 February 1843 (Note: The Great Comet of 1843 most likely represents the largest mass remaining of what was formerly the Great Comet of 1106)

X/1106 C1, also known as the Great Comet of 1106, was a comet that appeared on 2 February 1106, and was observed around the world from the beginning of February through to mid-March. It was recorded by astronomers in Wales, England, Japan, Korea, China, continental Europe, and Egypt.

It was observed to split into many pieces, forming the Great Comet of 1843 and several other small sungrazing comets observed by the SOHO space telescope. It is a member of the Kreutz Group, known as Subfragment I, a split from an earlier large (~150 km) comet that progressively fragmented under the influence of the Sun, possibly the Great Comet of 371 BC.

== Observations ==
=== Britain ===
A brief note in the Welsh manuscript known as the Brut y Tywysogion reads:

[-1106]. In that year there was seen a star wonderful to behold, throwing out behind it a beam of light of the thickness of a pillar in size and of exceeding brightness, foreboding what would come to pass in the future: for Henry, emperor of Rome, after mighty victories and a most pious life in Christ, went to his rest. And his son, after winning the seat of the empire of Rome, was made emperor.

The 1106 annal of the Peterborough Chronicle describes the comet. The Dorothy Whitlock translation reads:

In the first week of Lent, on the Friday, 16 February, in the evening, there appeared an unusual star, and for a long time after that it was seen shining a while every evening. This star appeared in the south-west; it seemed small and dark. The ray that shone from it, however, was very bright, and seemed to be like an immense beam shining north-east; and one evening it appeared as if this beam were forking into many rays toward the star from an opposite direction.

=== Japan ===
Fujiwara no Munetada, a Kugyō in Heian period, kept a diary today known as Chūyūki from 1087 to 1138. The comet appears intermittently in the diary entries from 1106 (Kajō 1) 4 to 27 January in lunisolar calendar (9 February to 4 March in Julian):

[四日] 今夕當天西方奇星出、漸欲入西山之間、其光如白雲引渡天、萬人見者爲太恠歟
[五日] 夜前之奇星出天、如白雲氣渡天如夜前
[六日] 去夜奇星又出、但随日数頗長増氣
[七日] 奇星出天如日者、雲睛天末星芒渡漢、見者莫不驚歎（中略）奇星已入西山、司天未奏、不知何星、連夜渡天、人以爲太恠
[八日] 今夕奇星亘天、日者天變頻以見也
[十八日] 今夜睛天、日者之奇星殊見、毎有御出此星正現、人人有恠氣歟
[廿二日] 是近日毎夜奇星出天、其前可有御幸者、仍逐電馳参、御出之間也
[廿四日] 今夕奇星頗有氣減、毎夜當西南天此星正現、司天所奏不一定云々
[廿七日]被定申臨時廿一日社奉幣日時使々、是依奇星恠被行者、予言定文、

Translation:

[4th] Strange star appears in this evening, seems like to sink into western mountain. The shining looks as if white cloud stretched across the whole sky, and many are puzzled to see it.
[5th] The star appears again, just like white cloud traversing sky, as the last night.
[6th] This evening, the star are there again, but the breath (tail) gets much longer day by day.
[7th] The star appears in the sky and shines like the sun, stretching like a cloud across the clear sky, and the beam of light go across the milky way. No one who sees keep calm. (...) The star already sank into western mountain. Astronomer have not reported to the court yet, so we don't know its nature. Since it come across the sky every evening, people are very suspicious on it.
[8th] This evening the strange star covers all over the sky. There are so many many celestial anomalies like that in these days.
[18th] Fine sky in this evening, the strange star is particularly clear. Since it appears every time the emperor goes out, people think it might be ominous sign.
[22nd] The star appears every evening. If the emperor goes out, people run around in panic.
[24th] This evening, the breath (tail) of the star is significantly diminished. Though the star appears in southwestern sky every evening, astronomer's report is unstable.
[27th] The schedule and messengers of extra offering of gifts to the 21 shrines are determined. This is due to the strangeness of the star, and I made the plan.

The comet also recorded in other chronicles in later years, including Sankaiki (late 12c) and Hyakurenshō (end of 13c). Famous chronicles Dainihonshi and Dai Nihon Shiryō cites these references.

=== China ===
An excerpt from a Chinese manuscript describes the following report of a comet in 1106, mentioning the comet's breakup after perihelion, dated 10 February:

In the reign of Hwuy Tsung, the 5th year of the epoch of Tsung Ning, the 1st moon [February], day Woo Seuh (Feb. 10th), a comet appeared in the west. It was like a great Pei Kow. The luminous envelope was scattered. It appeared like a broken-up star. It was 60 [degrees] in length and was 3 [degrees] in breadth. Its direction was to the north-east. It passed S.D. Kwei (southern Andromeda/northern Pisces). It passed S.D. Lew (Southern Aries), Wei (Pegasus), Maou, and Peih (Taurus). It then entered into the clouds and was no more seen.

=== Vietnam ===
The Vietnamese Annals Đại Việt sử ký toàn thư also recorded the comet event:

"Bính Tuất, năm thứ 6 mùa xuân, tháng giêng, sao chổi mọc ở phương Tây đuôi dài khắp nơi."
(At year Binh Tuat (Fire Dog), in spring January, there is a comet in the West with long radiant tail)

=== Egypt ===
The historian Ibn Aybak Al-Dawadari recorded the comet in his chronicle, Kanz al-Durar wa Jami' Al-Gurar (in 497 AH / 1106 AD)

وفيها ظهر كوكب عظيم بالشرق أبيض كأنّه القمر، له ذؤآبة من شرقيّه، تقدير طولها مئة وخمسين ذراعا، وله شعاع وضوء كالقمر الزاهر، وأقام يتردّد مدّة أيّام وليال. وكان إذا كان مع القمر يظنّ الناس أنّهما قمران، لولا ما فضل القمر بذؤآبته، وكان من الأعاجيب السمائية And during that time, a great star appeared in the east, white as the moon, with a tail extending eastward, estimated to be one hundred and fifty cubits long. It radiated light and brilliance like a shining moon, and it lingered for several days and nights. When it was near the moon, people thought there were two moons, were it not for the tail distinguishing the celestial body from the moon. It was among the heavenly wonders.

=== Others ===
- Sigebert of Gembloux mentions it in his Chronicon sive Chronographia (pub. 1111).
- Alexiad (1148)
- Anales Toledanos I (c. 1219)
- Liber de Significatione Cometarum (c. 1238)
- Wenxian Tongkao (文獻通考) (1308)
- History of Song (宋史) (1345)
- Xu Tongjian Gangmu (續通鑒綱目) (1476)
- Dainihonshi (大日本史) (1715)

== Resources ==
- Thomas Jones, Brut y Tywysogion, or, the Chronicle of the Princes: Red Book of Hergest version, University of Wales Press, Cardiff, 1955.
- Comet X/1106 C1: Publication der Sternwarte in Kiel, No. 6, pp. 1–66, and AN 238 (1930 Jun 5), pp. 403–4

== Sources ==
- Historic astronomical observations in Wales
- SOHO-620: A Comet on the Right(hand) Track
