= Great Comet of 1843 =

Kreutz sungrazer comet

C/1843 D1 (Great Comet of 1843)
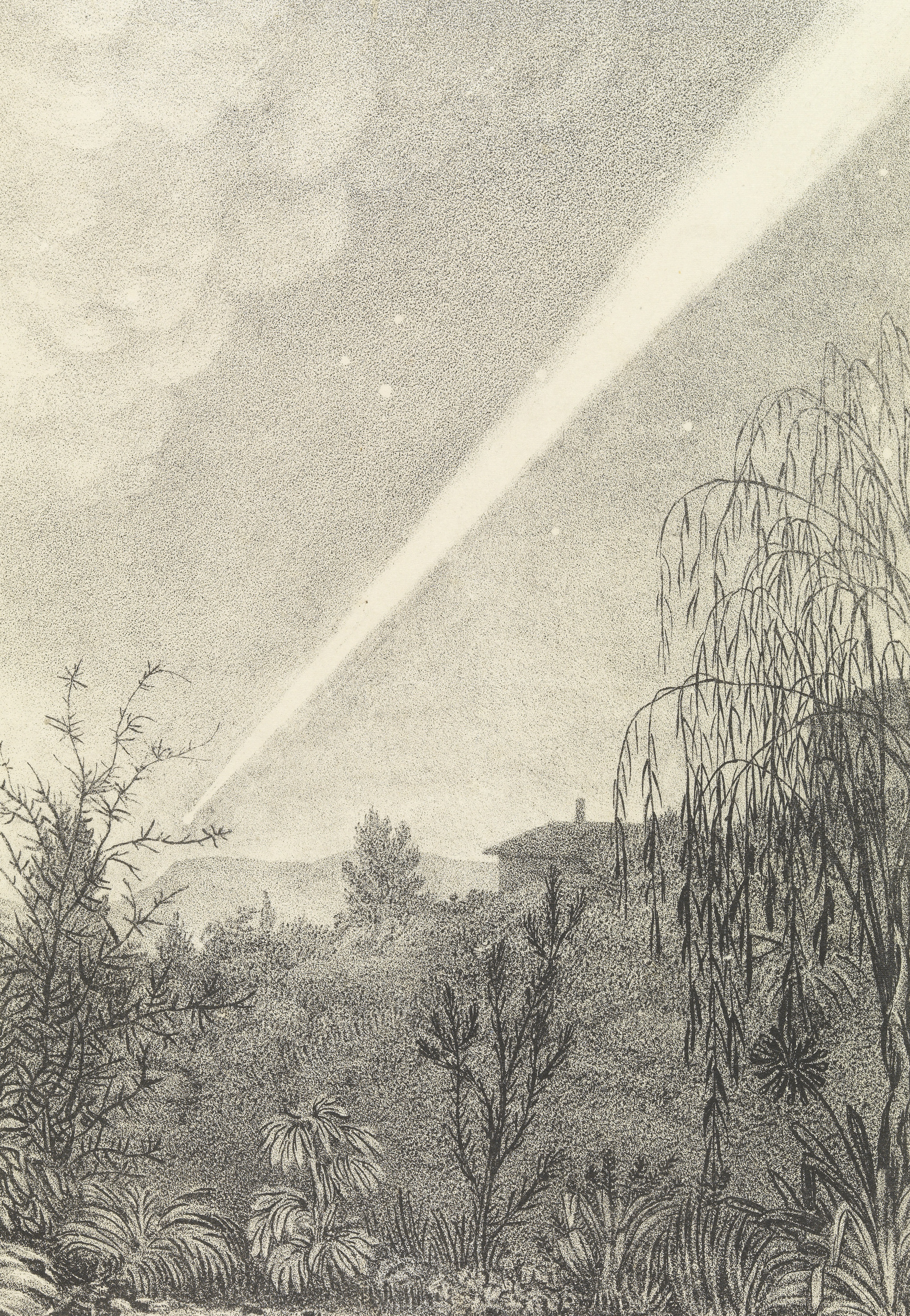
- A painting of the Great Comet of 1843, as seen from Tasmania, by Mary Morton Allport

Discovery
- Discovery date: 5 February 1843

Designations
- Alternative designations: 1843 I

Orbital characteristics
- Epoch: 27 February 1843 (JD 2394259.411)
- Observation arc: 45 days
- Number of observations: 200
- Orbit type: Kreutz sungrazer (Population I)
- Aphelion: ~156 AU
- Perihelion: 0.00553 AU (1.19 R_{☉}) (Note: The comet passed about 0.00553 AU (1.19 R_{☉}) from the center of the Sun which is (0.19 solar radii * 695700 km) = 132,000 km (82,000 mi) from the surface of the Sun.)
- Semi-major axis: ~78 AU
- Eccentricity: 0.99993
- Orbital period: ~600–800 years
- Max. orbital speed: 566.6 km/s
- Inclination: 144.36°
- Longitude of ascending node: 3.527°
- Argument of periapsis: 82.639°
- Last perihelion: 27 February 1843
- T_{Jupiter}: 0.006

Physical characteristics
- Mean radius: 24.75 km (15.38 mi)
- Mass: 7.30×10^{17} kg
- Comet total magnitude (M1): 4.9

The Great Comet of 1843, formally designated C/1843 D1 and 1843 I, was a long-period comet which became very bright in March 1843 (it is also known as the Great March Comet). It was discovered on February 5, 1843, and rapidly brightened to become a great comet. It was a member of the Kreutz sungrazers, specifically the Population I subgroup that originated from the breakup of a large parent comet in February 1106. These comets pass extremely close to the surface of the Sun—within a few solar radii—and often become very bright as a result.

== Perihelion ==
First observed in early February, 1843, it raced toward an incredibly close perihelion of about 827,000 km (~132,000 km from the surface of the Sun) on February 27, 1843; at this time it was observed in broad daylight roughly a degree away from the Sun. It passed closest to Earth on March 6, 1843, at a distance of 0.84 AU, and was at its greatest brilliance the following day; unfortunately for observers north of the equator, at its peak it was best visible from the Southern Hemisphere. It was last observed on April 19, 1843. At that time this comet had passed closer to the Sun than any other known object.

C/1843 D1 perihelion (closest approach to the center of the Sun) on 27 February 1843 (The Sun has a radius of 696000 km)
Perihelion (Sun approach)	Earth distance (AU)	Sun centerpoint distance (AU)	Velocity relative to Earth (km/s)	Velocity relative to Sun (km/s)	Solar elongation
27 February 1843 ≈21:59	0.993 AU (148.6 million km; 92.3 million mi; 386 LD)	0.00553 AU (827 thousand km; 514 thousand mi; 2.15 LD)	552.4	566.6	0.29°

== Physical characteristics ==
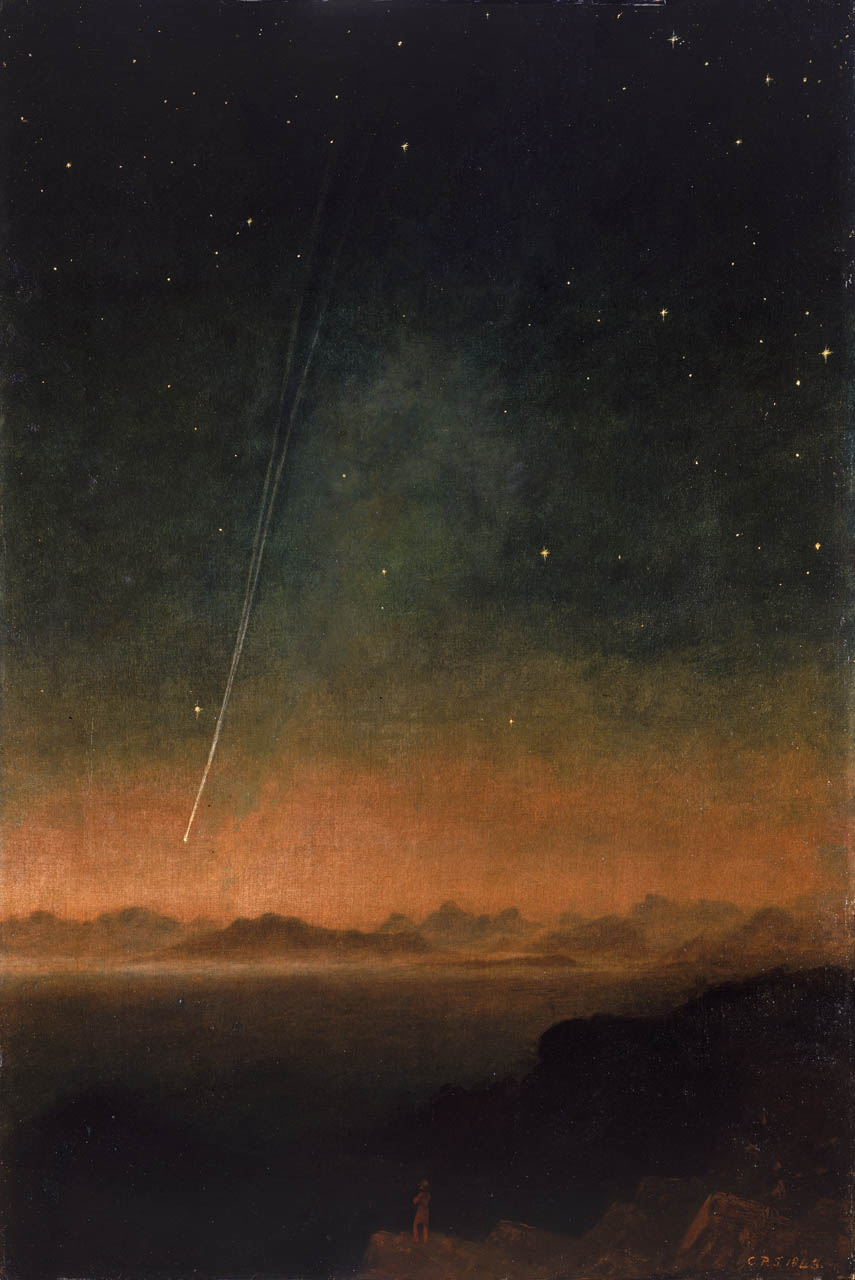
Charles Piazzi Smyth: The Great Comet of 1843

=== Nucleus size ===
Estimates in 2022 based on reconstructions of the origin of Kreutz sungrazers revealed that the nucleus of the Great Comet of 1843 possibly was about 24.75 km (15.38 mi) in effective radius, with a mass of approximately 7.30×10^{17} kg before it disintegrated upon perihelion.

=== Tail ===
The Great Comet of 1843 developed an extremely long tail during and after its perihelion passage. At over two astronomical units in length, it was the longest known cometary tail until measurements in 1996 showed that Comet Hyakutake's tail was almost twice as long. There is a painting in the National Maritime Museum that was created by astronomer Charles Piazzi Smyth with the purpose of showing the overall brightness and size of the tail of the comet.

== Orbit ==
Estimates for the orbital period of the comet have varied from 512±105 years (Kreutz's classical work from 1901), 654±103 years, 687 years, and 742 years. But the comet was only observed over a period of 45 days from March 5 to April 19, and the uncertainties mean it likely has an orbital period of 600 to 800 years.

Recent studies in 2022 and 2025 further solidified the link between the comets of 1106 and 1843 after their orbits were traced back to the comet witnessed by Ammianus Marcellinus in 363 AD.

== Musical depiction ==
The Mexican composer Luis Baca composed a waltz for piano, El cometa de 1843. It appeared as no. 13 in Instructor filarmónico, periódico semanario musical, Tomo primero (Mexico, 1843).

== See also ==
- Charles Piazzi Smyth
- List of Kreutz sungrazers
  - Great Comet of 1882
  - Great Southern Comet of 1880
  - Great Southern Comet of 1887
  - X/1882 K1 (Tewfik)
