= Great Southern Comet of 1887 =

Kreutz sungrazer comet

C/1887 B1 (Great Southern Comet of 1887)
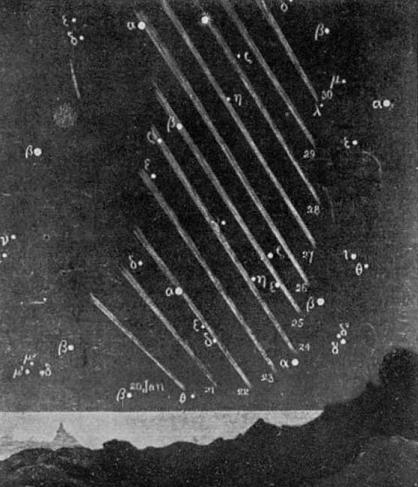
- Observations of the tail of C/1887 B1, Knowledge, Nov. 1887

Discovery
- Discovered by: J. M. Thome
- Discovery date: January 19, 1887

Designations
- Alternative designations: 1887 I; 1887a; Great Southern Comet of 1887; the "Headless Wonder"; Thome's Comet

Orbital characteristics
- Observation arc: 8 days (very short arc)
- Number of observations: 15
- Orbit type: Kreutz sungrazer
- Perihelion: 0.00483 AU (1.04 R_{☉})
- Eccentricity: 1.0 (assumed because of short arc) (Note: Given the short 8 day observation arc, the orbit has an assumed eccentricity of 1.0 and the uncertainties are not defined.)
- Max. orbital speed: 606.1 km/s at perihelion
- Inclination: 144.383°
- Last perihelion: January 11, 1887

Physical characteristics
- Mean radius: 1.2 km (0.75 mi)
- Comet total magnitude (M1): 6.3

The Great Southern Comet of 1887, or C/1887 B1 using its International Astronomical Union (IAU) designation, was a bright comet seen from the Southern Hemisphere during January 1887. Later calculations indicated it to be part of the Kreutz Sungrazing group. It came to perihelion (closest approach to the center of the Sun) on 11 January 1887 at a distance of 0.00483 AU (723 thousand km) with a velocity of 606.1 km/s. Since the Sun has a radius of 695700 km, the comet passed about 27,000 km (17,000 mi) from the surface of the Sun.

A curious feature of the comet was that few, if any observations were made of a cometary head or nucleus. As a result, some older astronomical texts refer to it as the "Headless Wonder".

== Discovery ==
The comet was officially discovered by astronomer John Macon Thome at Córdoba, Argentina, on January 19, at which point it was located in the constellation Grus. However, correspondence from William Henry Finlay suggests that it may also have been seen from Blauwberg, South Africa, on January 18. At the time of discovery the comet had already passed perihelion a week earlier, and its closest approach to Earth had been a month earlier on 22 December 1886 when it passed at a distance of 0.57 AU (85 million km).

== Observations ==
The comet reached first magnitude, and was widely observed by astronomers in the Southern Hemisphere for the remainder of January. On the 22nd Finlay described it as a "pale narrow ribbon of light, quite straight" of about 35 degrees in length, though no cometary head could be distinguished. On the 23rd, Thome recorded a tail length of over 40 degrees, but like other observers stated he could not find a nucleus. On January 27, C. Todd recorded seeing the comet's head as a "diffused nebulous mass", but noted a break between the head and the tail (possibly representing what is referred to as a tail disconnection event).

Following the publication of an ephemeris by S. C. Chandler, which suggested the comet could be located 20° from Rigel by the end of February, astronomers in the United States eagerly waited for it to move far enough into northern skies to be visible. However, the comet faded extremely rapidly, and never became visible from northern latitudes. It was last observed by John Tebbutt from New South Wales on January 30, a relatively short period of observation overall for a comet.

== Analysis ==
The first, speculative, orbit was calculated by Heinrich Kreutz; however definitive calculation was difficult because no observations were made of the nucleus. By February, Finlay had derived an orbit which linked the comet firmly to the Kreutz Sungrazing group. A more definitive orbit was calculated in 1978 by Zdeněk Sekanina, based on the assumption that the comet's head was on a great circle "through the sun and inner part of the tail".

Sekanina was subsequently to speculate that the unusual appearance of the comet was due to a "tail formation event", an outburst of cometary dust, about 6 hours after perihelion. This event and the rapidly fading brightness, Sekanina argued, showed that C/1887 B1, along with C/1945 X1 (du Toit), represented a class of comets in between the "great" sungrazers (such as the Great Comet of 1882) and the many smaller objects discovered by the Solar and Heliospheric Observatory.

C/1887 B1 perihelion (closest approach to the center of the Sun) on 11 January 1887 (The Sun has a radius of 696000 km)
| Perihelion (Sun approach) | Earth distance (AU) | Sun centerpoint distance (AU) | Velocity relative to Earth (km/s) | Velocity relative to Sun (km/s) | Solar elongation |
|---|---|---|---|---|---|
| 11 January 1887 ≈22:33 | 0.987 AU (147.7 million km; 91.7 million mi; 384 LD) | 0.00483 AU (723 thousand km; 449 thousand mi; 1.88 LD) | 576.7 | 606.1 | 0.16° |
