= List of minor planets: 546001–547000 =

The following is a partial list of minor planets, running from minor-planet number 546001 through 547000, inclusive. The primary data for this and other partial lists is based on JPL's "Small-Body Orbital Elements" and data available from the Minor Planet Center. Critical list information is also provided by the MPC, unless otherwise specified from Lowell Observatory. A detailed description of the table's columns and additional sources are given on the main page including a complete list of every page in this series, and a statistical break-up on the dynamical classification of minor planets.

Also see the summary list of all named bodies in numerical and alphabetical order, and the corresponding naming citations for the number range of this particular list. New namings may only be added to this list after official publication, as the preannouncement of names is condemned by the Working Group for Small Bodies Nomenclature of the International Astronomical Union.

Near-Earth obj.	MBA (inner)	MBA (outer)	Centaur
Mars-crosser	MBA (middle)	Jupiter trojan	Trans-Neptunian obj.
Unclassified

== 546001–546100 ==
Designation			Discovery			Properties		Ref
Permanent	Provisional	Named after	Date	Site	Discoverer(s)	Category	Diam.	Ref
546001	2011 WW_{26}	—	October 18, 2011	Kitt Peak	Spacewatch	·	2.7 km	MPC · JPL
546002	2011 WY_{28}	—	August 30, 2005	Palomar	NEAT	EOS	2.3 km	MPC · JPL
546003	2011 WE_{35}	—	December 21, 2006	Mount Lemmon	Mount Lemmon Survey	·	3.7 km	MPC · JPL
546004	2011 WQ_{36}	—	April 7, 2005	Mount Lemmon	Mount Lemmon Survey	·	2.0 km	MPC · JPL
546005	2011 WT_{40}	—	October 23, 2005	Catalina	CSS	EOS	2.2 km	MPC · JPL
546006	2011 WP_{45}	—	June 5, 2005	Junk Bond	D. Healy	H	480 m	MPC · JPL
546007	2011 WJ_{54}	—	November 24, 2011	Haleakala	Pan-STARRS 1	·	2.4 km	MPC · JPL
546008	2011 WB_{61}	—	February 28, 2009	Kitt Peak	Spacewatch	·	600 m	MPC · JPL
546009	2011 WS_{66}	—	November 2, 2011	Charleston	R. Holmes	·	1.9 km	MPC · JPL
546010	2011 WV_{68}	—	November 26, 2011	Haleakala	Pan-STARRS 1	PHO	820 m	MPC · JPL
546011	2011 WJ_{71}	—	November 24, 2008	Mount Lemmon	Mount Lemmon Survey	·	630 m	MPC · JPL
546012	2011 WT_{71}	—	November 17, 2011	Mount Lemmon	Mount Lemmon Survey	·	3.0 km	MPC · JPL
546013	2011 WV_{72}	—	December 1, 2006	Mount Lemmon	Mount Lemmon Survey	·	2.8 km	MPC · JPL
546014	2011 WH_{75}	—	October 19, 2011	Kitt Peak	Spacewatch	·	550 m	MPC · JPL
546015	2011 WV_{79}	—	September 3, 2010	Mount Lemmon	Mount Lemmon Survey	·	1.9 km	MPC · JPL
546016	2011 WM_{84}	—	October 26, 2011	Haleakala	Pan-STARRS 1	·	2.2 km	MPC · JPL
546017	2011 WQ_{85}	—	March 31, 2008	Mount Lemmon	Mount Lemmon Survey	·	3.0 km	MPC · JPL
546018	2011 WB_{88}	—	November 3, 2011	Catalina	CSS	·	2.4 km	MPC · JPL
546019	2011 WR_{94}	—	October 26, 2011	Haleakala	Pan-STARRS 1	·	1.2 km	MPC · JPL
546020	2011 WH_{101}	—	January 31, 2009	Mount Lemmon	Mount Lemmon Survey	·	850 m	MPC · JPL
546021	2011 WZ_{102}	—	October 23, 2011	Haleakala	Pan-STARRS 1	PHO	710 m	MPC · JPL
546022	2011 WC_{103}	—	November 30, 2011	Catalina	CSS	·	2.7 km	MPC · JPL
546023	2011 WE_{109}	—	January 16, 2009	Kitt Peak	Spacewatch	·	580 m	MPC · JPL
546024	2011 WS_{114}	—	May 26, 2009	Kitt Peak	Spacewatch	PHO	890 m	MPC · JPL
546025 Ábrahámpéter	2011 WG_{117}	Ábrahámpéter	November 17, 2011	Piszkéstető	A. Farkas, K. Sárneczky	·	2.9 km	MPC · JPL
546026	2011 WQ_{120}	—	November 11, 2004	Kitt Peak	Deep Ecliptic Survey	·	880 m	MPC · JPL
546027	2011 WL_{126}	—	November 23, 2011	Kitt Peak	Spacewatch	·	3.1 km	MPC · JPL
546028	2011 WY_{127}	—	October 28, 2011	Mount Lemmon	Mount Lemmon Survey	·	2.6 km	MPC · JPL
546029	2011 WQ_{130}	—	March 31, 2009	Mount Lemmon	Mount Lemmon Survey	·	3.3 km	MPC · JPL
546030	2011 WR_{134}	—	November 22, 2011	Mount Lemmon	Mount Lemmon Survey	H	400 m	MPC · JPL
546031	2011 WG_{135}	—	November 17, 2011	Mount Lemmon	Mount Lemmon Survey	·	3.2 km	MPC · JPL
546032	2011 WD_{136}	—	November 25, 2011	Haleakala	Pan-STARRS 1	·	790 m	MPC · JPL
546033	2011 WE_{139}	—	March 1, 2009	Kitt Peak	Spacewatch	·	720 m	MPC · JPL
546034	2011 WY_{149}	—	November 1, 2011	Catalina	CSS	·	1.7 km	MPC · JPL
546035	2011 WW_{150}	—	July 30, 2005	Palomar	NEAT	·	2.6 km	MPC · JPL
546036	2011 WG_{151}	—	October 29, 2006	Mount Lemmon	Mount Lemmon Survey	TIR	2.7 km	MPC · JPL
546037	2011 WQ_{152}	—	October 23, 2011	Haleakala	Pan-STARRS 1	·	3.3 km	MPC · JPL
546038	2011 WC_{158}	—	April 30, 2009	Mount Lemmon	Mount Lemmon Survey	·	3.6 km	MPC · JPL
546039	2011 WJ_{158}	—	July 15, 2010	WISE	WISE	·	520 m	MPC · JPL
546040	2011 WL_{159}	—	November 24, 2011	Mount Lemmon	Mount Lemmon Survey	NYS	740 m	MPC · JPL
546041	2011 WM_{160}	—	November 24, 2011	Haleakala	Pan-STARRS 1	·	2.4 km	MPC · JPL
546042	2011 WG_{166}	—	April 25, 2014	Mount Lemmon	Mount Lemmon Survey	·	1.7 km	MPC · JPL
546043	2011 WN_{167}	—	November 22, 2011	Mount Lemmon	Mount Lemmon Survey	·	660 m	MPC · JPL
546044	2011 WP_{167}	—	November 18, 2011	Mount Lemmon	Mount Lemmon Survey	EOS	1.6 km	MPC · JPL
546045	2011 WT_{168}	—	November 18, 2011	Mount Lemmon	Mount Lemmon Survey	·	600 m	MPC · JPL
546046	2011 XP_{3}	—	January 10, 2007	Mount Lemmon	Mount Lemmon Survey	·	2.9 km	MPC · JPL
546047	2011 XC_{4}	—	August 25, 2003	Cerro Tololo	Deep Ecliptic Survey	·	990 m	MPC · JPL
546048	2011 XR_{4}	—	December 6, 2011	Haleakala	Pan-STARRS 1	·	1.1 km	MPC · JPL
546049 Zhujin	2011 YL_{4}	Zhujin	December 23, 2011	Xingming	Sun, G., X. Gao	·	1.0 km	MPC · JPL
546050	2011 YC_{6}	—	September 10, 2007	Mount Lemmon	Mount Lemmon Survey	·	850 m	MPC · JPL
546051	2011 YM_{15}	—	October 20, 2007	Kitt Peak	Spacewatch	MAS	650 m	MPC · JPL
546052	2011 YA_{16}	—	September 30, 2005	Mount Lemmon	Mount Lemmon Survey	EOS	2.3 km	MPC · JPL
546053	2011 YK_{21}	—	December 1, 2011	Haleakala	Pan-STARRS 1	·	970 m	MPC · JPL
546054	2011 YH_{23}	—	December 25, 2011	Kitt Peak	Spacewatch	·	780 m	MPC · JPL
546055	2011 YK_{23}	—	December 25, 2011	Kitt Peak	Spacewatch	PHO	730 m	MPC · JPL
546056	2011 YD_{25}	—	February 6, 1997	Kitt Peak	Spacewatch	·	940 m	MPC · JPL
546057	2011 YM_{25}	—	October 23, 2003	Kitt Peak	Deep Ecliptic Survey	MAS	610 m	MPC · JPL
546058	2011 YJ_{26}	—	December 25, 2011	Kitt Peak	Spacewatch	PHO	1.2 km	MPC · JPL
546059	2011 YF_{29}	—	December 24, 2011	Mount Lemmon	Mount Lemmon Survey	·	2.0 km	MPC · JPL
546060	2011 YZ_{31}	—	December 26, 2011	Kitt Peak	Spacewatch	·	790 m	MPC · JPL
546061	2011 YD_{34}	—	April 10, 2005	Mount Lemmon	Mount Lemmon Survey	·	1.0 km	MPC · JPL
546062	2011 YH_{38}	—	November 3, 2007	Dauban	Kugel, C. R. F.	PHO	1.0 km	MPC · JPL
546063	2011 YR_{40}	—	December 24, 2011	Mount Lemmon	Mount Lemmon Survey	·	3.4 km	MPC · JPL
546064	2011 YK_{42}	—	October 8, 2007	Mount Lemmon	Mount Lemmon Survey	·	960 m	MPC · JPL
546065	2011 YG_{46}	—	October 8, 2007	Kitt Peak	Spacewatch	·	690 m	MPC · JPL
546066	2011 YZ_{46}	—	December 27, 2011	Kitt Peak	Spacewatch	H	620 m	MPC · JPL
546067	2011 YM_{48}	—	October 21, 2011	Kitt Peak	Spacewatch	(2076)	840 m	MPC · JPL
546068	2011 YF_{58}	—	November 28, 2011	Mount Lemmon	Mount Lemmon Survey	·	1.1 km	MPC · JPL
546069	2011 YX_{58}	—	June 22, 2004	Kitt Peak	Spacewatch	EMA	3.0 km	MPC · JPL
546070	2011 YS_{63}	—	March 16, 2005	Catalina	CSS	·	1.3 km	MPC · JPL
546071	2011 YF_{67}	—	March 8, 2005	Mount Lemmon	Mount Lemmon Survey	V	570 m	MPC · JPL
546072	2011 YW_{69}	—	December 31, 2011	Mount Lemmon	Mount Lemmon Survey	·	820 m	MPC · JPL
546073	2011 YL_{74}	—	December 29, 2011	Mount Lemmon	Mount Lemmon Survey	H	440 m	MPC · JPL
546074	2011 YW_{80}	—	November 24, 2006	Mount Lemmon	Mount Lemmon Survey	·	2.9 km	MPC · JPL
546075	2011 YN_{81}	—	April 5, 2014	Haleakala	Pan-STARRS 1	·	3.7 km	MPC · JPL
546076	2011 YR_{81}	—	October 10, 2015	Mount Lemmon	Mount Lemmon Survey	·	2.1 km	MPC · JPL
546077	2011 YM_{82}	—	December 24, 2011	Mount Lemmon	Mount Lemmon Survey	·	2.7 km	MPC · JPL
546078	2010 TC_{21}	—	September 4, 2010	Kitt Peak	Spacewatch	·	1.0 km	MPC · JPL
546079	2010 TF_{21}	—	September 17, 2010	Kitt Peak	Spacewatch	·	1.2 km	MPC · JPL
546080	2010 TK_{21}	—	September 18, 2010	Kitt Peak	Spacewatch	·	1.7 km	MPC · JPL
546081	2010 TF_{24}	—	March 10, 2005	Mount Lemmon	Mount Lemmon Survey	·	540 m	MPC · JPL
546082	2010 TL_{30}	—	October 2, 2010	Kitt Peak	Spacewatch	·	650 m	MPC · JPL
546083	2010 TX_{33}	—	October 26, 2005	Kitt Peak	Spacewatch	EOS	1.6 km	MPC · JPL
546084	2010 TY_{33}	—	October 26, 2005	Kitt Peak	Spacewatch	·	1.5 km	MPC · JPL
546085	2010 TA_{41}	—	September 23, 2000	Socorro	LINEAR	·	600 m	MPC · JPL
546086	2010 TM_{42}	—	October 2, 2010	Kitt Peak	Spacewatch	·	2.3 km	MPC · JPL
546087	2010 TB_{47}	—	October 6, 2010	Mayhill-ISON	L. Elenin	LUT	4.7 km	MPC · JPL
546088	2010 TM_{48}	—	September 29, 2005	Mount Lemmon	Mount Lemmon Survey	KOR	1.4 km	MPC · JPL
546089	2010 TP_{49}	—	October 1, 2005	Kitt Peak	Spacewatch	·	1.9 km	MPC · JPL
546090	2010 TM_{51}	—	August 30, 2005	Kitt Peak	Spacewatch	·	2.0 km	MPC · JPL
546091	2010 TN_{53}	—	October 8, 2010	Kitt Peak	Spacewatch	·	570 m	MPC · JPL
546092	2010 TN_{58}	—	February 28, 2008	Kitt Peak	Spacewatch	·	1.9 km	MPC · JPL
546093	2010 TM_{59}	—	March 10, 2007	Kitt Peak	Spacewatch	·	2.1 km	MPC · JPL
546094	2010 TT_{59}	—	July 17, 2004	Cerro Tololo	Deep Ecliptic Survey	EOS	2.1 km	MPC · JPL
546095	2010 TM_{60}	—	August 29, 2005	Palomar	NEAT	·	3.2 km	MPC · JPL
546096	2010 TR_{62}	—	September 19, 2010	Kitt Peak	Spacewatch	·	650 m	MPC · JPL
546097	2010 TG_{64}	—	September 11, 2010	Kitt Peak	Spacewatch	EOS	1.8 km	MPC · JPL
546098 Kosaka	2010 TF_{65}	Kosaka	October 8, 2010	Moletai	K. Černis	·	2.0 km	MPC · JPL
546099	2010 TS_{66}	—	February 4, 2005	Kitt Peak	Spacewatch	·	670 m	MPC · JPL
546100	2010 TG_{67}	—	September 27, 2000	Kitt Peak	Spacewatch	·	2.5 km	MPC · JPL

== 546101–546200 ==
back to top

Designation			Discovery			Properties		Ref
Permanent	Provisional	Named after	Date	Site	Discoverer(s)	Category	Diam.	Ref
546101	2010 TN_{67}	—	August 23, 2003	Cerro Tololo	Deep Ecliptic Survey	·	740 m	MPC · JPL
546102	2010 TB_{69}	—	September 4, 2010	Kitt Peak	Spacewatch	·	670 m	MPC · JPL
546103	2010 TS_{69}	—	October 9, 2005	Kitt Peak	Spacewatch	·	1.3 km	MPC · JPL
546104	2010 TS_{70}	—	October 8, 2010	Kitt Peak	Spacewatch	(2076)	430 m	MPC · JPL
546105	2010 TB_{71}	—	August 12, 2004	Palomar	NEAT	·	4.2 km	MPC · JPL
546106	2010 TV_{71}	—	September 30, 2003	Kitt Peak	Spacewatch	·	720 m	MPC · JPL
546107	2010 TF_{73}	—	October 27, 2005	Kitt Peak	Spacewatch	·	2.0 km	MPC · JPL
546108	2010 TR_{73}	—	September 29, 2005	Mount Lemmon	Mount Lemmon Survey	·	1.7 km	MPC · JPL
546109	2010 TZ_{75}	—	August 25, 2003	Cerro Tololo	Deep Ecliptic Survey	·	690 m	MPC · JPL
546110	2010 TD_{77}	—	October 8, 2010	Charleston	R. Holmes	·	2.8 km	MPC · JPL
546111	2010 TS_{77}	—	October 8, 2010	Kitt Peak	Spacewatch	·	2.3 km	MPC · JPL
546112	2010 TU_{78}	—	October 8, 2010	Kitt Peak	Spacewatch	·	1.2 km	MPC · JPL
546113	2010 TO_{82}	—	October 1, 2010	Mount Lemmon	Mount Lemmon Survey	·	2.2 km	MPC · JPL
546114	2010 TS_{82}	—	September 17, 2010	Mount Lemmon	Mount Lemmon Survey	·	1.3 km	MPC · JPL
546115	2010 TV_{82}	—	September 29, 2000	Kitt Peak	Spacewatch	·	2.1 km	MPC · JPL
546116	2010 TS_{84}	—	October 1, 2005	Kitt Peak	Spacewatch	·	1.2 km	MPC · JPL
546117	2010 TW_{86}	—	September 15, 2010	Mount Lemmon	Mount Lemmon Survey	·	1.5 km	MPC · JPL
546118	2010 TP_{91}	—	October 1, 2010	Kitt Peak	Spacewatch	EOS	1.3 km	MPC · JPL
546119	2010 TH_{93}	—	October 9, 2010	Kitt Peak	Spacewatch	·	1.4 km	MPC · JPL
546120	2010 TA_{94}	—	October 2, 2005	Mount Lemmon	Mount Lemmon Survey	·	1.4 km	MPC · JPL
546121	2010 TD_{94}	—	October 1, 2010	Kitt Peak	Spacewatch	·	1.5 km	MPC · JPL
546122	2010 TV_{94}	—	September 21, 2003	Kitt Peak	Spacewatch	V	620 m	MPC · JPL
546123	2010 TX_{94}	—	October 18, 2003	Kitt Peak	Spacewatch	·	1.1 km	MPC · JPL
546124	2010 TB_{95}	—	February 28, 2008	Kitt Peak	Spacewatch	·	2.5 km	MPC · JPL
546125	2010 TF_{95}	—	August 6, 2010	Kitt Peak	Spacewatch	·	2.0 km	MPC · JPL
546126	2010 TW_{95}	—	November 2, 2007	Mount Lemmon	Mount Lemmon Survey	·	530 m	MPC · JPL
546127	2010 TW_{97}	—	April 2, 2005	Palomar	NEAT	·	790 m	MPC · JPL
546128	2010 TZ_{98}	—	May 25, 2006	Mount Lemmon	Mount Lemmon Survey	·	610 m	MPC · JPL
546129	2010 TU_{99}	—	October 27, 2005	Mount Lemmon	Mount Lemmon Survey	·	1.8 km	MPC · JPL
546130	2010 TG_{106}	—	October 9, 2010	Kitt Peak	Spacewatch	·	2.2 km	MPC · JPL
546131	2010 TR_{106}	—	October 9, 2010	Kitt Peak	Spacewatch	·	520 m	MPC · JPL
546132	2010 TT_{106}	—	October 9, 2010	Kitt Peak	Spacewatch	·	480 m	MPC · JPL
546133	2010 TM_{107}	—	January 27, 2007	Mount Lemmon	Mount Lemmon Survey	·	2.3 km	MPC · JPL
546134	2010 TQ_{107}	—	September 4, 2010	Kitt Peak	Spacewatch	·	1.8 km	MPC · JPL
546135	2010 TN_{108}	—	October 9, 2010	Kitt Peak	Spacewatch	(2076)	560 m	MPC · JPL
546136	2010 TO_{108}	—	September 16, 2010	Kitt Peak	Spacewatch	·	490 m	MPC · JPL
546137	2010 TS_{109}	—	September 16, 2010	Kitt Peak	Spacewatch	·	700 m	MPC · JPL
546138	2010 TP_{110}	—	October 9, 2010	Mount Lemmon	Mount Lemmon Survey	·	1.7 km	MPC · JPL
546139	2010 TF_{112}	—	October 9, 2010	Mount Lemmon	Mount Lemmon Survey	·	570 m	MPC · JPL
546140	2010 TO_{113}	—	September 10, 2010	Kitt Peak	Spacewatch	·	2.3 km	MPC · JPL
546141	2010 TW_{120}	—	September 15, 2010	Mount Lemmon	Mount Lemmon Survey	·	630 m	MPC · JPL
546142	2010 TY_{124}	—	October 30, 2005	Mount Lemmon	Mount Lemmon Survey	·	2.9 km	MPC · JPL
546143	2010 TZ_{124}	—	October 10, 2010	Mount Lemmon	Mount Lemmon Survey	EOS	1.4 km	MPC · JPL
546144	2010 TA_{125}	—	October 10, 2010	Mount Lemmon	Mount Lemmon Survey	·	1.8 km	MPC · JPL
546145	2010 TZ_{125}	—	November 12, 2007	Mount Lemmon	Mount Lemmon Survey	·	650 m	MPC · JPL
546146	2010 TF_{126}	—	October 10, 2010	Kitt Peak	Spacewatch	·	2.1 km	MPC · JPL
546147	2010 TM_{126}	—	October 1, 2003	Kitt Peak	Spacewatch	·	600 m	MPC · JPL
546148	2010 TN_{126}	—	February 28, 2008	Mount Lemmon	Mount Lemmon Survey	·	2.8 km	MPC · JPL
546149	2010 TS_{126}	—	October 10, 2010	Kitt Peak	Spacewatch	·	2.5 km	MPC · JPL
546150	2010 TB_{127}	—	October 28, 2005	Kitt Peak	Spacewatch	·	1.1 km	MPC · JPL
546151	2010 TG_{127}	—	October 1, 2010	La Sagra	OAM	·	510 m	MPC · JPL
546152	2010 TZ_{127}	—	October 11, 2010	Bergisch Gladbach	W. Bickel	·	710 m	MPC · JPL
546153	2010 TY_{128}	—	December 6, 2007	Mount Lemmon	Mount Lemmon Survey	·	490 m	MPC · JPL
546154	2010 TN_{129}	—	March 28, 2009	Mount Lemmon	Mount Lemmon Survey	(2076)	960 m	MPC · JPL
546155	2010 TV_{129}	—	September 11, 2010	Kitt Peak	Spacewatch	·	580 m	MPC · JPL
546156	2010 TE_{133}	—	October 11, 2010	Mount Lemmon	Mount Lemmon Survey	·	540 m	MPC · JPL
546157	2010 TK_{133}	—	October 11, 2010	Mount Lemmon	Mount Lemmon Survey	·	690 m	MPC · JPL
546158	2010 TK_{137}	—	April 3, 2008	Kitt Peak	Spacewatch	·	2.2 km	MPC · JPL
546159	2010 TU_{137}	—	October 11, 2010	Kitt Peak	Spacewatch	·	690 m	MPC · JPL
546160	2010 TC_{138}	—	September 16, 2010	Mount Lemmon	Mount Lemmon Survey	·	2.6 km	MPC · JPL
546161	2010 TN_{138}	—	October 11, 2010	Mount Lemmon	Mount Lemmon Survey	·	700 m	MPC · JPL
546162	2010 TE_{139}	—	September 22, 2003	Kitt Peak	Spacewatch	·	510 m	MPC · JPL
546163	2010 TG_{139}	—	January 27, 2007	Mount Lemmon	Mount Lemmon Survey	·	1.8 km	MPC · JPL
546164	2010 TN_{139}	—	October 11, 2010	Mount Lemmon	Mount Lemmon Survey	·	510 m	MPC · JPL
546165	2010 TZ_{139}	—	October 11, 2010	Mount Lemmon	Mount Lemmon Survey	·	2.1 km	MPC · JPL
546166	2010 TG_{140}	—	February 14, 2007	Mauna Kea	P. A. Wiegert	·	2.4 km	MPC · JPL
546167	2010 TZ_{141}	—	September 9, 2004	Kitt Peak	Spacewatch	·	2.1 km	MPC · JPL
546168	2010 TD_{142}	—	October 11, 2010	Mayhill-ISON	L. Elenin	·	910 m	MPC · JPL
546169	2010 TX_{144}	—	May 28, 2009	Mount Lemmon	Mount Lemmon Survey	·	1.1 km	MPC · JPL
546170	2010 TO_{146}	—	October 11, 2010	Mount Lemmon	Mount Lemmon Survey	·	2.2 km	MPC · JPL
546171	2010 TJ_{150}	—	October 12, 1997	Kitt Peak	Spacewatch	·	530 m	MPC · JPL
546172	2010 TN_{150}	—	December 3, 2007	Kitt Peak	Spacewatch	·	660 m	MPC · JPL
546173	2010 TP_{152}	—	March 2, 2009	Mount Lemmon	Mount Lemmon Survey	·	630 m	MPC · JPL
546174	2010 TW_{152}	—	September 25, 2005	Kitt Peak	Spacewatch	·	1.5 km	MPC · JPL
546175	2010 TG_{153}	—	October 27, 2005	Kitt Peak	Spacewatch	·	2.5 km	MPC · JPL
546176	2010 TU_{153}	—	September 18, 2010	Mount Lemmon	Mount Lemmon Survey	EOS	2.2 km	MPC · JPL
546177	2010 TE_{160}	—	October 10, 2010	Mount Lemmon	Mount Lemmon Survey	·	890 m	MPC · JPL
546178	2010 TC_{161}	—	September 17, 2010	Kitt Peak	Spacewatch	EOS	1.4 km	MPC · JPL
546179	2010 TZ_{165}	—	October 14, 2010	Magdalena Ridge	Ryan, W. H., Ryan, E. V.	·	560 m	MPC · JPL
546180	2010 TJ_{166}	—	October 7, 2010	Catalina	CSS	·	1.4 km	MPC · JPL
546181	2010 TM_{170}	—	October 13, 2010	Wildberg	R. Apitzsch	·	2.4 km	MPC · JPL
546182	2010 TR_{170}	—	July 6, 2003	Kitt Peak	Spacewatch	·	580 m	MPC · JPL
546183	2010 TR_{171}	—	October 13, 2010	Mount Lemmon	Mount Lemmon Survey	·	660 m	MPC · JPL
546184	2010 TX_{172}	—	March 14, 2007	Mount Lemmon	Mount Lemmon Survey	·	2.9 km	MPC · JPL
546185	2010 TT_{173}	—	October 11, 2010	Catalina	CSS	·	830 m	MPC · JPL
546186 Vasylivchenko	2010 TA_{176}	Vasylivchenko	October 7, 2010	Andrushivka	Y. Ivaščenko	·	2.4 km	MPC · JPL
546187	2010 TS_{176}	—	October 9, 2010	Catalina	CSS	·	2.6 km	MPC · JPL
546188	2010 TH_{177}	—	October 11, 2010	Catalina	CSS	EOS	1.8 km	MPC · JPL
546189	2010 TY_{181}	—	October 10, 2010	Kitt Peak	Spacewatch	·	910 m	MPC · JPL
546190	2010 TC_{182}	—	March 19, 2009	Kitt Peak	Spacewatch	·	730 m	MPC · JPL
546191	2010 TQ_{184}	—	October 19, 2010	Mount Lemmon	Mount Lemmon Survey	·	3.0 km	MPC · JPL
546192	2010 TH_{185}	—	August 15, 2004	Cerro Tololo	Deep Ecliptic Survey	·	3.0 km	MPC · JPL
546193	2010 TT_{185}	—	September 18, 2003	Kitt Peak	Spacewatch	·	640 m	MPC · JPL
546194	2010 TJ_{188}	—	October 15, 2010	Mayhill-ISON	L. Elenin	EOS	1.9 km	MPC · JPL
546195	2010 TO_{192}	—	October 27, 2009	Mount Lemmon	Mount Lemmon Survey	L4	6.2 km	MPC · JPL
546196	2010 TV_{194}	—	October 14, 2010	Dauban	C. Rinner, Kugel, F.	·	2.8 km	MPC · JPL
546197	2010 TA_{195}	—	October 1, 2010	Catalina	CSS	PHO	770 m	MPC · JPL
546198	2010 TB_{195}	—	October 2, 2010	Kitt Peak	Spacewatch	·	2.0 km	MPC · JPL
546199	2010 TN_{196}	—	August 8, 2013	Haleakala	Pan-STARRS 1	·	590 m	MPC · JPL
546200	2010 TP_{196}	—	October 14, 2010	Mount Lemmon	Mount Lemmon Survey	·	2.7 km	MPC · JPL

== 546201–546300 ==
back to top

Designation			Discovery			Properties		Ref
Permanent	Provisional	Named after	Date	Site	Discoverer(s)	Category	Diam.	Ref
546201	2010 TQ_{196}	—	September 19, 2014	Haleakala	Pan-STARRS 1	·	1.2 km	MPC · JPL
546202	2010 TR_{196}	—	January 10, 2013	Haleakala	Pan-STARRS 1	·	3.2 km	MPC · JPL
546203	2010 TW_{196}	—	March 13, 2016	Haleakala	Pan-STARRS 1	·	630 m	MPC · JPL
546204	2010 TZ_{196}	—	October 10, 2010	Kitt Peak	Spacewatch	·	2.9 km	MPC · JPL
546205	2010 TN_{197}	—	August 21, 2015	Haleakala	Pan-STARRS 1	·	1.6 km	MPC · JPL
546206	2010 TD_{200}	—	October 11, 2010	Mount Lemmon	Mount Lemmon Survey	·	630 m	MPC · JPL
546207	2010 TG_{203}	—	May 5, 2003	Kitt Peak	Spacewatch	·	2.4 km	MPC · JPL
546208	2010 TE_{204}	—	October 12, 2010	Mount Lemmon	Mount Lemmon Survey	EOS	1.8 km	MPC · JPL
546209	2010 TY_{204}	—	December 4, 2016	Mount Lemmon	Mount Lemmon Survey	EOS	1.6 km	MPC · JPL
546210	2010 TK_{205}	—	October 14, 2010	Mount Lemmon	Mount Lemmon Survey	EOS	1.5 km	MPC · JPL
546211	2010 TR_{205}	—	May 22, 2014	Mount Lemmon	Mount Lemmon Survey	·	1.8 km	MPC · JPL
546212	2010 TL_{206}	—	October 13, 2010	Mount Lemmon	Mount Lemmon Survey	·	2.4 km	MPC · JPL
546213	2010 TD_{207}	—	October 15, 2010	Sandlot	G. Hug	VER	2.6 km	MPC · JPL
546214	2010 TG_{207}	—	October 9, 2010	Catalina	CSS	·	1.6 km	MPC · JPL
546215	2010 TH_{207}	—	October 12, 2010	Mount Lemmon	Mount Lemmon Survey	·	2.3 km	MPC · JPL
546216	2010 TL_{207}	—	October 11, 2010	Catalina	CSS	·	610 m	MPC · JPL
546217	2010 TP_{207}	—	October 9, 2010	Mount Lemmon	Mount Lemmon Survey	·	2.2 km	MPC · JPL
546218	2010 TK_{210}	—	October 13, 2010	Kitt Peak	Spacewatch	L4	6.6 km	MPC · JPL
546219	2010 TN_{211}	—	July 10, 2010	WISE	WISE	·	3.0 km	MPC · JPL
546220	2010 TD_{213}	—	October 12, 2010	Mount Lemmon	Mount Lemmon Survey	·	1.9 km	MPC · JPL
546221	2010 TL_{213}	—	October 13, 2010	Mount Lemmon	Mount Lemmon Survey	·	570 m	MPC · JPL
546222	2010 UA_{3}	—	October 25, 2005	Mount Lemmon	Mount Lemmon Survey	EOS	1.6 km	MPC · JPL
546223	2010 UG_{8}	—	September 25, 2009	Catalina	CSS	T_{j} (2.99)	3.6 km	MPC · JPL
546224	2010 UE_{9}	—	October 31, 2005	Mount Lemmon	Mount Lemmon Survey	EOS	1.6 km	MPC · JPL
546225	2010 UZ_{12}	—	October 11, 1999	Kitt Peak	Spacewatch	·	2.8 km	MPC · JPL
546226	2010 UQ_{14}	—	September 20, 2003	Palomar	NEAT	·	750 m	MPC · JPL
546227	2010 UW_{17}	—	October 28, 2010	Mount Lemmon	Mount Lemmon Survey	·	2.7 km	MPC · JPL
546228	2010 UG_{21}	—	October 14, 2010	Mount Lemmon	Mount Lemmon Survey	·	2.7 km	MPC · JPL
546229	2010 UY_{23}	—	October 28, 2010	Mount Lemmon	Mount Lemmon Survey	·	2.4 km	MPC · JPL
546230	2010 UK_{25}	—	July 27, 2009	Kitt Peak	Spacewatch	·	2.9 km	MPC · JPL
546231	2010 UW_{25}	—	October 28, 2010	Mount Lemmon	Mount Lemmon Survey	·	3.0 km	MPC · JPL
546232	2010 UY_{25}	—	October 14, 2010	Mount Lemmon	Mount Lemmon Survey	EOS	1.7 km	MPC · JPL
546233	2010 UD_{26}	—	October 14, 2010	Mount Lemmon	Mount Lemmon Survey	·	3.1 km	MPC · JPL
546234	2010 UO_{28}	—	September 20, 2003	Palomar	NEAT	·	670 m	MPC · JPL
546235 Kolbenheyer	2010 UK_{29}	Kolbenheyer	October 28, 2010	Piszkéstető	S. Kürti, K. Sárneczky	·	1.4 km	MPC · JPL
546236	2010 UM_{31}	—	September 11, 2010	Mount Lemmon	Mount Lemmon Survey	·	2.0 km	MPC · JPL
546237	2010 UW_{32}	—	October 11, 2010	Mount Lemmon	Mount Lemmon Survey	EOS	1.4 km	MPC · JPL
546238	2010 UO_{33}	—	October 13, 2010	Mount Lemmon	Mount Lemmon Survey	·	2.2 km	MPC · JPL
546239	2010 UH_{35}	—	February 23, 2007	Kitt Peak	Spacewatch	·	2.2 km	MPC · JPL
546240	2010 UH_{36}	—	November 20, 2003	Kitt Peak	Spacewatch	·	740 m	MPC · JPL
546241	2010 UP_{36}	—	October 29, 2010	Mount Lemmon	Mount Lemmon Survey	·	540 m	MPC · JPL
546242	2010 UX_{36}	—	October 29, 2010	Mount Lemmon	Mount Lemmon Survey	L4	9.8 km	MPC · JPL
546243	2010 UU_{37}	—	August 15, 2004	Cerro Tololo	Deep Ecliptic Survey	·	3.0 km	MPC · JPL
546244	2010 UQ_{38}	—	September 18, 2010	Mount Lemmon	Mount Lemmon Survey	EMA	2.6 km	MPC · JPL
546245	2010 UO_{40}	—	September 19, 2003	Kitt Peak	Spacewatch	·	660 m	MPC · JPL
546246	2010 UA_{41}	—	February 26, 2007	Mount Lemmon	Mount Lemmon Survey	EOS	2.1 km	MPC · JPL
546247	2010 UR_{41}	—	October 9, 2010	Mount Lemmon	Mount Lemmon Survey	·	1.9 km	MPC · JPL
546248	2010 UT_{42}	—	October 11, 2010	Kitt Peak	Spacewatch	·	2.3 km	MPC · JPL
546249	2010 UO_{43}	—	October 9, 2010	Bergisch Gladbach	W. Bickel	·	1.7 km	MPC · JPL
546250	2010 UW_{44}	—	October 30, 2010	Mount Lemmon	Mount Lemmon Survey	·	1.8 km	MPC · JPL
546251	2010 US_{45}	—	September 16, 2010	Mount Lemmon	Mount Lemmon Survey	·	2.1 km	MPC · JPL
546252	2010 UD_{47}	—	July 25, 2003	Palomar	NEAT	·	550 m	MPC · JPL
546253	2010 UZ_{48}	—	December 18, 2007	Mount Lemmon	Mount Lemmon Survey	·	610 m	MPC · JPL
546254	2010 UC_{49}	—	October 31, 2010	Mount Lemmon	Mount Lemmon Survey	·	770 m	MPC · JPL
546255	2010 UY_{49}	—	October 31, 2010	Mount Lemmon	Mount Lemmon Survey	VER	2.6 km	MPC · JPL
546256	2010 UT_{50}	—	October 31, 2010	Mount Lemmon	Mount Lemmon Survey	L4	10 km	MPC · JPL
546257	2010 UJ_{56}	—	October 9, 2010	Mount Lemmon	Mount Lemmon Survey	EOS	2.6 km	MPC · JPL
546258	2010 UZ_{57}	—	October 29, 2010	Kitt Peak	Spacewatch	EOS	1.8 km	MPC · JPL
546259	2010 UG_{60}	—	November 15, 2003	Kitt Peak	Spacewatch	·	610 m	MPC · JPL
546260	2010 UB_{62}	—	July 5, 2003	Kitt Peak	Spacewatch	·	620 m	MPC · JPL
546261	2010 UH_{62}	—	October 30, 2010	Mount Lemmon	Mount Lemmon Survey	·	2.1 km	MPC · JPL
546262	2010 UW_{65}	—	September 17, 2010	Mount Lemmon	Mount Lemmon Survey	EOS	1.6 km	MPC · JPL
546263	2010 UE_{66}	—	September 28, 2009	Mount Lemmon	Mount Lemmon Survey	L4	8.3 km	MPC · JPL
546264	2010 UJ_{67}	—	April 18, 2002	Kitt Peak	Spacewatch	·	3.4 km	MPC · JPL
546265	2010 UA_{69}	—	November 25, 2005	Kitt Peak	Spacewatch	·	2.6 km	MPC · JPL
546266	2010 UC_{69}	—	December 5, 2005	Mount Lemmon	Mount Lemmon Survey	·	2.3 km	MPC · JPL
546267	2010 UP_{71}	—	July 19, 2006	Mauna Kea	P. A. Wiegert, D. Subasinghe	·	770 m	MPC · JPL
546268	2010 UV_{71}	—	October 17, 2010	Mount Lemmon	Mount Lemmon Survey	·	460 m	MPC · JPL
546269	2010 UL_{72}	—	May 18, 2002	Palomar	NEAT	AEG	3.7 km	MPC · JPL
546270	2010 UQ_{73}	—	August 25, 2003	Palomar	NEAT	·	790 m	MPC · JPL
546271	2010 UO_{80}	—	October 14, 2010	Mount Lemmon	Mount Lemmon Survey	·	2.7 km	MPC · JPL
546272	2010 UT_{80}	—	October 30, 2005	Kitt Peak	Spacewatch	·	1.7 km	MPC · JPL
546273	2010 UY_{81}	—	October 16, 2010	Pla D'Arguines	R. Ferrando, Ferrando, M.	L4	8.2 km	MPC · JPL
546274	2010 UO_{83}	—	March 11, 2003	Kitt Peak	Spacewatch	L4	8.5 km	MPC · JPL
546275 Kozák	2010 UW_{83}	Kozák	October 30, 2010	Piszkéstető	K. Sárneczky, Z. Kuli	L4	10 km	MPC · JPL
546276	2010 UP_{84}	—	July 8, 2003	Palomar	NEAT	·	770 m	MPC · JPL
546277	2010 UJ_{91}	—	August 23, 2003	Palomar	NEAT	·	690 m	MPC · JPL
546278	2010 US_{91}	—	December 24, 2005	Kitt Peak	Spacewatch	·	2.8 km	MPC · JPL
546279	2010 UW_{95}	—	October 24, 2001	Palomar	NEAT	·	1.3 km	MPC · JPL
546280	2010 UX_{97}	—	October 28, 2010	Mount Lemmon	Mount Lemmon Survey	·	2.4 km	MPC · JPL
546281	2010 UM_{98}	—	October 29, 2010	Mount Lemmon	Mount Lemmon Survey	·	3.5 km	MPC · JPL
546282	2010 UO_{98}	—	October 29, 2010	Mount Lemmon	Mount Lemmon Survey	·	2.4 km	MPC · JPL
546283	2010 UC_{99}	—	October 29, 2010	Piszkés-tető	K. Sárneczky, Z. Kuli	·	2.8 km	MPC · JPL
546284	2010 UR_{99}	—	February 14, 2007	Mauna Kea	P. A. Wiegert	·	1.7 km	MPC · JPL
546285	2010 UE_{100}	—	October 12, 2010	Mount Lemmon	Mount Lemmon Survey	·	690 m	MPC · JPL
546286 Fuchsjenő	2010 UF_{101}	Fuchsjenő	October 31, 2010	Piszkés-tető	K. Sárneczky, Z. Kuli	L4	8.9 km	MPC · JPL
546287	2010 UA_{102}	—	December 5, 2007	Kitt Peak	Spacewatch	·	660 m	MPC · JPL
546288	2010 UK_{105}	—	January 18, 2008	Mount Lemmon	Mount Lemmon Survey	·	880 m	MPC · JPL
546289	2010 UL_{108}	—	October 30, 2010	Mount Lemmon	Mount Lemmon Survey	L4	7.7 km	MPC · JPL
546290	2010 UN_{108}	—	October 14, 2010	Mount Lemmon	Mount Lemmon Survey	·	2.8 km	MPC · JPL
546291	2010 UG_{109}	—	September 17, 2010	Mount Lemmon	Mount Lemmon Survey	·	2.4 km	MPC · JPL
546292	2010 UB_{110}	—	October 19, 2010	Mount Lemmon	Mount Lemmon Survey	·	700 m	MPC · JPL
546293	2010 UD_{110}	—	October 29, 2010	Catalina	CSS	V	610 m	MPC · JPL
546294	2010 US_{110}	—	December 31, 2007	Mount Lemmon	Mount Lemmon Survey	·	610 m	MPC · JPL
546295	2010 UX_{110}	—	October 17, 2010	Mount Lemmon	Mount Lemmon Survey	·	770 m	MPC · JPL
546296	2010 UG_{111}	—	October 29, 2010	Kitt Peak	Spacewatch	·	820 m	MPC · JPL
546297	2010 UH_{111}	—	October 17, 2010	Mount Lemmon	Mount Lemmon Survey	·	2.9 km	MPC · JPL
546298	2010 UC_{112}	—	April 10, 2013	Haleakala	Pan-STARRS 1	·	2.3 km	MPC · JPL
546299	2010 UN_{113}	—	October 29, 2010	Kitt Peak	Spacewatch	·	2.5 km	MPC · JPL
546300	2010 UP_{113}	—	October 30, 2010	Mount Lemmon	Mount Lemmon Survey	·	1.4 km	MPC · JPL

== 546301–546400 ==
back to top

Designation			Discovery			Properties		Ref
Permanent	Provisional	Named after	Date	Site	Discoverer(s)	Category	Diam.	Ref
546301	2010 UZ_{115}	—	October 17, 2010	Mount Lemmon	Mount Lemmon Survey	·	2.9 km	MPC · JPL
546302	2010 UK_{116}	—	October 31, 2010	Mount Lemmon	Mount Lemmon Survey	·	2.4 km	MPC · JPL
546303	2010 UP_{117}	—	August 14, 2015	Haleakala	Pan-STARRS 1	·	2.4 km	MPC · JPL
546304	2010 UT_{117}	—	October 28, 2010	Mount Lemmon	Mount Lemmon Survey	L4	6.6 km	MPC · JPL
546305	2010 UB_{118}	—	October 17, 2010	Mount Lemmon	Mount Lemmon Survey	·	450 m	MPC · JPL
546306	2010 UC_{118}	—	October 31, 2010	Mount Lemmon	Mount Lemmon Survey	·	2.3 km	MPC · JPL
546307	2010 UF_{118}	—	May 6, 2014	Haleakala	Pan-STARRS 1	·	1.9 km	MPC · JPL
546308	2010 UH_{118}	—	October 29, 2010	Kitt Peak	Spacewatch	·	2.6 km	MPC · JPL
546309	2010 UU_{118}	—	October 29, 2010	Kitt Peak	Spacewatch	·	2.5 km	MPC · JPL
546310	2010 UH_{119}	—	October 31, 2010	Kitt Peak	Spacewatch	·	2.4 km	MPC · JPL
546311	2010 UN_{119}	—	September 17, 2010	Mount Lemmon	Mount Lemmon Survey	·	2.1 km	MPC · JPL
546312	2010 UB_{120}	—	December 20, 2007	Kitt Peak	Spacewatch	·	660 m	MPC · JPL
546313	2010 UG_{120}	—	October 31, 2010	Kitt Peak	Spacewatch	L4	6.8 km	MPC · JPL
546314	2010 UH_{120}	—	October 31, 2010	Kitt Peak	Spacewatch	L4	8.0 km	MPC · JPL
546315	2010 UR_{120}	—	October 29, 2010	Mount Lemmon	Mount Lemmon Survey	V	520 m	MPC · JPL
546316	2010 UT_{120}	—	October 28, 2010	Mount Lemmon	Mount Lemmon Survey	EOS	1.5 km	MPC · JPL
546317	2010 VV_{2}	—	September 17, 2010	Mount Lemmon	Mount Lemmon Survey	·	2.3 km	MPC · JPL
546318	2010 VA_{5}	—	November 1, 2010	Mount Lemmon	Mount Lemmon Survey	·	2.4 km	MPC · JPL
546319	2010 VS_{7}	—	September 21, 2003	Kitt Peak	Spacewatch	·	780 m	MPC · JPL
546320	2010 VM_{8}	—	April 6, 2008	Mount Lemmon	Mount Lemmon Survey	·	1.7 km	MPC · JPL
546321	2010 VZ_{8}	—	November 1, 2010	Mount Lemmon	Mount Lemmon Survey	·	700 m	MPC · JPL
546322	2010 VB_{9}	—	March 1, 2009	Kitt Peak	Spacewatch	(883)	840 m	MPC · JPL
546323	2010 VX_{10}	—	March 9, 2007	Kitt Peak	Spacewatch	·	3.3 km	MPC · JPL
546324	2010 VW_{13}	—	September 20, 2003	Palomar	NEAT	·	630 m	MPC · JPL
546325	2010 VK_{14}	—	November 1, 2010	Catalina	CSS	·	3.4 km	MPC · JPL
546326	2010 VG_{16}	—	March 2, 2008	Kitt Peak	Spacewatch	·	2.3 km	MPC · JPL
546327	2010 VA_{17}	—	October 17, 2010	Mount Lemmon	Mount Lemmon Survey	·	590 m	MPC · JPL
546328	2010 VR_{18}	—	November 2, 2010	Mount Lemmon	Mount Lemmon Survey	·	620 m	MPC · JPL
546329	2010 VO_{19}	—	November 2, 2010	Kitt Peak	Spacewatch	·	710 m	MPC · JPL
546330	2010 VB_{23}	—	April 22, 2009	Mount Lemmon	Mount Lemmon Survey	·	530 m	MPC · JPL
546331	2010 VN_{24}	—	October 22, 2003	Kitt Peak	Spacewatch	·	510 m	MPC · JPL
546332	2010 VF_{25}	—	October 20, 2003	Palomar	NEAT	·	530 m	MPC · JPL
546333	2010 VT_{25}	—	November 1, 2010	Kitt Peak	Spacewatch	·	2.3 km	MPC · JPL
546334	2010 VB_{26}	—	November 1, 2010	Kitt Peak	Spacewatch	·	2.2 km	MPC · JPL
546335	2010 VX_{27}	—	June 12, 2004	Palomar	NEAT	·	3.2 km	MPC · JPL
546336	2010 VP_{28}	—	November 2, 2010	Kitt Peak	Spacewatch	EMA	3.0 km	MPC · JPL
546337	2010 VG_{30}	—	October 22, 2003	Haleakala	NEAT	·	720 m	MPC · JPL
546338	2010 VM_{30}	—	October 19, 2010	Mount Lemmon	Mount Lemmon Survey	·	770 m	MPC · JPL
546339	2010 VY_{32}	—	January 27, 2007	Mount Lemmon	Mount Lemmon Survey	·	2.4 km	MPC · JPL
546340	2010 VH_{39}	—	September 5, 2010	Mount Lemmon	Mount Lemmon Survey	·	720 m	MPC · JPL
546341	2010 VE_{40}	—	July 5, 2010	Kitt Peak	Spacewatch	·	3.0 km	MPC · JPL
546342	2010 VU_{41}	—	September 18, 2010	Mount Lemmon	Mount Lemmon Survey	·	3.4 km	MPC · JPL
546343	2010 VZ_{41}	—	September 18, 2010	Mount Lemmon	Mount Lemmon Survey	·	2.1 km	MPC · JPL
546344	2010 VP_{42}	—	March 30, 2008	Kitt Peak	Spacewatch	EOS	1.6 km	MPC · JPL
546345	2010 VW_{42}	—	October 17, 2010	Mount Lemmon	Mount Lemmon Survey	·	2.4 km	MPC · JPL
546346	2010 VQ_{43}	—	November 1, 2010	Mount Lemmon	Mount Lemmon Survey	·	490 m	MPC · JPL
546347	2010 VE_{45}	—	February 1, 2005	Kitt Peak	Spacewatch	·	680 m	MPC · JPL
546348	2010 VU_{45}	—	October 29, 2010	Kitt Peak	Spacewatch	L4	8.2 km	MPC · JPL
546349	2010 VT_{47}	—	August 18, 2009	Bergisch Gladbach	W. Bickel	EOS	2.0 km	MPC · JPL
546350	2010 VL_{50}	—	March 14, 2005	Mount Lemmon	Mount Lemmon Survey	·	760 m	MPC · JPL
546351	2010 VM_{50}	—	September 30, 2005	Mount Lemmon	Mount Lemmon Survey	·	1.3 km	MPC · JPL
546352	2010 VX_{50}	—	October 6, 2005	Mount Lemmon	Mount Lemmon Survey	·	1.4 km	MPC · JPL
546353	2010 VO_{53}	—	November 3, 2010	Mount Lemmon	Mount Lemmon Survey	·	2.9 km	MPC · JPL
546354	2010 VD_{54}	—	November 3, 2010	Mount Lemmon	Mount Lemmon Survey	L4	7.9 km	MPC · JPL
546355	2010 VE_{55}	—	November 3, 2010	Mount Lemmon	Mount Lemmon Survey	·	1.5 km	MPC · JPL
546356	2010 VU_{55}	—	May 25, 2003	Kitt Peak	Spacewatch	·	2.8 km	MPC · JPL
546357	2010 VY_{55}	—	November 3, 2010	Mount Lemmon	Mount Lemmon Survey	·	2.5 km	MPC · JPL
546358	2010 VD_{56}	—	July 18, 2007	Mount Lemmon	Mount Lemmon Survey	L4	7.4 km	MPC · JPL
546359	2010 VG_{56}	—	November 3, 2010	Mount Lemmon	Mount Lemmon Survey	·	860 m	MPC · JPL
546360	2010 VN_{58}	—	November 4, 2010	Mount Lemmon	Mount Lemmon Survey	EMA	2.6 km	MPC · JPL
546361	2010 VB_{59}	—	November 4, 2010	Mount Lemmon	Mount Lemmon Survey	·	2.2 km	MPC · JPL
546362	2010 VV_{59}	—	December 10, 2005	Kitt Peak	Spacewatch	EOS	1.9 km	MPC · JPL
546363	2010 VB_{60}	—	November 4, 2010	Mount Lemmon	Mount Lemmon Survey	EOS	2.2 km	MPC · JPL
546364	2010 VH_{60}	—	November 6, 2005	Kitt Peak	Spacewatch	·	2.8 km	MPC · JPL
546365	2010 VK_{60}	—	November 4, 2010	Mount Lemmon	Mount Lemmon Survey	L4	7.5 km	MPC · JPL
546366	2010 VU_{62}	—	November 5, 2010	Kitt Peak	Spacewatch	EOS	1.7 km	MPC · JPL
546367	2010 VD_{63}	—	November 5, 2010	Mayhill-ISON	L. Elenin	H	420 m	MPC · JPL
546368	2010 VA_{65}	—	November 7, 2010	Kitt Peak	Spacewatch	·	3.2 km	MPC · JPL
546369	2010 VQ_{65}	—	November 1, 2010	Mount Lemmon	Mount Lemmon Survey	·	2.4 km	MPC · JPL
546370	2010 VX_{65}	—	November 1, 2010	Mount Lemmon	Mount Lemmon Survey	·	2.9 km	MPC · JPL
546371	2010 VT_{70}	—	September 7, 2004	Kitt Peak	Spacewatch	·	3.3 km	MPC · JPL
546372	2010 VE_{76}	—	April 17, 2005	Siding Spring	SSS	PHO	1.4 km	MPC · JPL
546373	2010 VW_{76}	—	September 28, 2003	Kitt Peak	Spacewatch	·	910 m	MPC · JPL
546374	2010 VT_{77}	—	November 3, 2010	Mount Lemmon	Mount Lemmon Survey	·	700 m	MPC · JPL
546375	2010 VF_{78}	—	August 10, 2010	Kitt Peak	Spacewatch	·	3.9 km	MPC · JPL
546376	2010 VM_{79}	—	November 3, 2010	Mount Lemmon	Mount Lemmon Survey	·	2.6 km	MPC · JPL
546377	2010 VE_{80}	—	November 3, 2010	Mount Lemmon	Mount Lemmon Survey	·	2.8 km	MPC · JPL
546378	2010 VL_{80}	—	January 19, 2008	Mount Lemmon	Mount Lemmon Survey	V	630 m	MPC · JPL
546379	2010 VR_{81}	—	November 3, 2010	Kitt Peak	Spacewatch	EOS	1.9 km	MPC · JPL
546380	2010 VQ_{82}	—	November 3, 2010	La Sagra	OAM	EOS	1.9 km	MPC · JPL
546381	2010 VZ_{83}	—	November 5, 2010	Kitt Peak	Spacewatch	·	3.0 km	MPC · JPL
546382	2010 VA_{85}	—	November 5, 2010	Kitt Peak	Spacewatch	·	3.6 km	MPC · JPL
546383	2010 VK_{86}	—	May 12, 2007	Kitt Peak	Spacewatch	·	2.9 km	MPC · JPL
546384	2010 VT_{86}	—	November 6, 2010	Kitt Peak	Spacewatch	·	3.5 km	MPC · JPL
546385	2010 VV_{86}	—	November 6, 2010	Kitt Peak	Spacewatch	EOS	1.5 km	MPC · JPL
546386	2010 VO_{87}	—	November 6, 2010	Kitt Peak	Spacewatch	EOS	1.4 km	MPC · JPL
546387	2010 VA_{88}	—	November 6, 2010	Kitt Peak	Spacewatch	L4	8.2 km	MPC · JPL
546388	2010 VC_{88}	—	October 29, 2010	Kitt Peak	Spacewatch	·	2.2 km	MPC · JPL
546389	2010 VM_{88}	—	October 14, 2010	Mount Lemmon	Mount Lemmon Survey	EOS	1.6 km	MPC · JPL
546390	2010 VV_{88}	—	October 29, 2010	Kitt Peak	Spacewatch	·	2.2 km	MPC · JPL
546391	2010 VW_{88}	—	October 29, 2010	Kitt Peak	Spacewatch	·	3.9 km	MPC · JPL
546392	2010 VS_{89}	—	October 14, 2010	Mount Lemmon	Mount Lemmon Survey	·	2.6 km	MPC · JPL
546393	2010 VJ_{91}	—	November 6, 2010	Kitt Peak	Spacewatch	·	3.1 km	MPC · JPL
546394	2010 VB_{94}	—	September 11, 2010	Mount Lemmon	Mount Lemmon Survey	·	3.0 km	MPC · JPL
546395	2010 VA_{95}	—	November 7, 2010	Mount Lemmon	Mount Lemmon Survey	EOS	1.4 km	MPC · JPL
546396 Szilágyiáron	2010 VN_{95}	Szilágyiáron	October 30, 2010	Piszkés-tető	K. Sárneczky, Z. Kuli	L4	8.5 km	MPC · JPL
546397	2010 VB_{97}	—	November 2, 2010	Mount Lemmon	Mount Lemmon Survey	·	3.1 km	MPC · JPL
546398	2010 VE_{97}	—	September 30, 2010	Mount Lemmon	Mount Lemmon Survey	·	3.9 km	MPC · JPL
546399	2010 VS_{98}	—	November 10, 2010	Kitt Peak	Spacewatch	H	380 m	MPC · JPL
546400	2010 VW_{100}	—	November 5, 2010	Kitt Peak	Spacewatch	·	2.9 km	MPC · JPL

== 546401–546500 ==
back to top

Designation			Discovery			Properties		Ref
Permanent	Provisional	Named after	Date	Site	Discoverer(s)	Category	Diam.	Ref
546401	2010 VD_{101}	—	October 21, 2003	Palomar	NEAT	·	760 m	MPC · JPL
546402	2010 VJ_{102}	—	November 5, 2010	Kitt Peak	Spacewatch	THM	2.0 km	MPC · JPL
546403	2010 VL_{103}	—	October 14, 2010	Mount Lemmon	Mount Lemmon Survey	·	2.6 km	MPC · JPL
546404	2010 VF_{104}	—	November 19, 2003	Kitt Peak	Spacewatch	·	550 m	MPC · JPL
546405	2010 VV_{104}	—	November 24, 2003	Socorro	LINEAR	·	630 m	MPC · JPL
546406	2010 VD_{108}	—	October 12, 2010	Mount Lemmon	Mount Lemmon Survey	L4	7.0 km	MPC · JPL
546407	2010 VF_{108}	—	October 12, 2010	Mount Lemmon	Mount Lemmon Survey	·	1.3 km	MPC · JPL
546408	2010 VJ_{109}	—	November 6, 2010	Mount Lemmon	Mount Lemmon Survey	·	2.7 km	MPC · JPL
546409	2010 VR_{110}	—	September 11, 2010	Mount Lemmon	Mount Lemmon Survey	·	3.0 km	MPC · JPL
546410	2010 VV_{110}	—	October 30, 2005	Kitt Peak	Spacewatch	EOS	1.8 km	MPC · JPL
546411	2010 VX_{110}	—	November 6, 2010	Mount Lemmon	Mount Lemmon Survey	·	730 m	MPC · JPL
546412	2010 VE_{113}	—	October 3, 2006	Mount Lemmon	Mount Lemmon Survey	·	920 m	MPC · JPL
546413	2010 VV_{113}	—	April 6, 2008	Kitt Peak	Spacewatch	·	2.2 km	MPC · JPL
546414	2010 VF_{115}	—	April 26, 2007	Mount Lemmon	Mount Lemmon Survey	·	2.5 km	MPC · JPL
546415	2010 VP_{115}	—	November 7, 2010	Mount Lemmon	Mount Lemmon Survey	·	2.9 km	MPC · JPL
546416	2010 VM_{116}	—	November 8, 2010	Kitt Peak	Spacewatch	·	3.1 km	MPC · JPL
546417	2010 VS_{117}	—	November 3, 2010	Kitt Peak	Spacewatch	·	1.8 km	MPC · JPL
546418	2010 VX_{118}	—	March 13, 2005	Mount Lemmon	Mount Lemmon Survey	PHO	730 m	MPC · JPL
546419	2010 VJ_{119}	—	October 17, 2009	Mount Lemmon	Mount Lemmon Survey	L4 · ERY	6.8 km	MPC · JPL
546420	2010 VN_{120}	—	July 9, 2003	Kitt Peak	Spacewatch	·	3.5 km	MPC · JPL
546421	2010 VP_{124}	—	November 8, 2010	Mount Lemmon	Mount Lemmon Survey	·	3.0 km	MPC · JPL
546422	2010 VS_{124}	—	October 29, 2010	Mount Lemmon	Mount Lemmon Survey	·	2.7 km	MPC · JPL
546423	2010 VN_{125}	—	December 4, 2005	Kitt Peak	Spacewatch	·	2.1 km	MPC · JPL
546424	2010 VW_{125}	—	November 8, 2010	Mount Lemmon	Mount Lemmon Survey	·	1.7 km	MPC · JPL
546425	2010 VH_{126}	—	October 31, 2010	Kitt Peak	Spacewatch	·	710 m	MPC · JPL
546426	2010 VM_{129}	—	October 29, 2005	Catalina	CSS	·	2.4 km	MPC · JPL
546427	2010 VF_{131}	—	October 30, 2010	Mount Lemmon	Mount Lemmon Survey	·	3.1 km	MPC · JPL
546428	2010 VW_{132}	—	November 2, 2010	Mount Lemmon	Mount Lemmon Survey	V	560 m	MPC · JPL
546429	2010 VY_{132}	—	November 10, 2010	Catalina	CSS	·	2.6 km	MPC · JPL
546430	2010 VU_{135}	—	November 10, 2010	Mount Lemmon	Mount Lemmon Survey	·	750 m	MPC · JPL
546431	2010 VL_{136}	—	November 10, 2010	Mount Lemmon	Mount Lemmon Survey	·	1.6 km	MPC · JPL
546432	2010 VW_{136}	—	May 5, 2008	Mount Lemmon	Mount Lemmon Survey	·	2.7 km	MPC · JPL
546433	2010 VC_{137}	—	May 25, 2001	Kitt Peak	Spacewatch	·	4.4 km	MPC · JPL
546434	2010 VG_{138}	—	November 20, 2003	Kitt Peak	Spacewatch	·	600 m	MPC · JPL
546435	2010 VV_{140}	—	October 21, 2003	Palomar	NEAT	·	710 m	MPC · JPL
546436	2010 VP_{141}	—	October 17, 2010	Mount Lemmon	Mount Lemmon Survey	·	2.8 km	MPC · JPL
546437	2010 VM_{142}	—	November 6, 2010	Mount Lemmon	Mount Lemmon Survey	·	910 m	MPC · JPL
546438	2010 VW_{142}	—	November 6, 2010	Mount Lemmon	Mount Lemmon Survey	·	2.7 km	MPC · JPL
546439	2010 VS_{143}	—	October 17, 2010	Mount Lemmon	Mount Lemmon Survey	VER	2.5 km	MPC · JPL
546440	2010 VU_{146}	—	February 11, 2008	Mount Lemmon	Mount Lemmon Survey	·	930 m	MPC · JPL
546441	2010 VE_{147}	—	November 6, 2010	Mount Lemmon	Mount Lemmon Survey	·	2.4 km	MPC · JPL
546442	2010 VK_{147}	—	November 6, 2010	Mount Lemmon	Mount Lemmon Survey	·	1.8 km	MPC · JPL
546443	2010 VP_{147}	—	September 15, 2009	Kitt Peak	Spacewatch	L4	7.1 km	MPC · JPL
546444	2010 VF_{148}	—	November 6, 2010	Mount Lemmon	Mount Lemmon Survey	·	2.5 km	MPC · JPL
546445	2010 VS_{148}	—	November 6, 2010	Mount Lemmon	Mount Lemmon Survey	·	1.7 km	MPC · JPL
546446	2010 VO_{151}	—	November 6, 2010	Mount Lemmon	Mount Lemmon Survey	ELF	3.2 km	MPC · JPL
546447	2010 VN_{153}	—	November 7, 2010	Mount Lemmon	Mount Lemmon Survey	THM	2.2 km	MPC · JPL
546448	2010 VA_{154}	—	April 9, 2002	Kitt Peak	Spacewatch	·	770 m	MPC · JPL
546449	2010 VS_{154}	—	November 7, 2010	Mount Lemmon	Mount Lemmon Survey	AEO	830 m	MPC · JPL
546450	2010 VA_{155}	—	December 30, 2007	Mount Lemmon	Mount Lemmon Survey	·	580 m	MPC · JPL
546451	2010 VE_{155}	—	September 11, 2010	Mount Lemmon	Mount Lemmon Survey	·	2.0 km	MPC · JPL
546452	2010 VS_{156}	—	September 30, 2003	Kitt Peak	Spacewatch	·	800 m	MPC · JPL
546453	2010 VK_{158}	—	November 8, 2010	Mauna Kea	Forshay, P., M. Micheli	EOS	1.7 km	MPC · JPL
546454	2010 VD_{159}	—	November 8, 2010	Mount Lemmon	Mount Lemmon Survey	L4 · ERY	7.1 km	MPC · JPL
546455	2010 VR_{159}	—	October 29, 2003	Kitt Peak	Spacewatch	·	740 m	MPC · JPL
546456	2010 VW_{159}	—	April 20, 2007	Mount Lemmon	Mount Lemmon Survey	·	1.6 km	MPC · JPL
546457	2010 VB_{160}	—	January 7, 2006	Kitt Peak	Spacewatch	·	2.7 km	MPC · JPL
546458	2010 VO_{163}	—	October 29, 2010	Kitt Peak	Spacewatch	L4	9.0 km	MPC · JPL
546459	2010 VO_{164}	—	September 24, 2009	Kitt Peak	Spacewatch	·	3.2 km	MPC · JPL
546460	2010 VF_{166}	—	October 31, 2010	Kitt Peak	Spacewatch	L4 · ERY	6.6 km	MPC · JPL
546461	2010 VG_{166}	—	November 10, 2010	Mount Lemmon	Mount Lemmon Survey	L4	7.5 km	MPC · JPL
546462	2010 VJ_{168}	—	November 10, 2010	Mount Lemmon	Mount Lemmon Survey	·	3.1 km	MPC · JPL
546463	2010 VO_{168}	—	November 1, 2010	Kitt Peak	Spacewatch	·	3.7 km	MPC · JPL
546464	2010 VU_{169}	—	November 10, 2010	Mount Lemmon	Mount Lemmon Survey	·	2.9 km	MPC · JPL
546465	2010 VL_{170}	—	September 7, 2004	Kitt Peak	Spacewatch	·	1.8 km	MPC · JPL
546466	2010 VM_{170}	—	September 19, 2003	Palomar	NEAT	·	760 m	MPC · JPL
546467	2010 VE_{171}	—	October 26, 2009	Mount Lemmon	Mount Lemmon Survey	L4	10 km	MPC · JPL
546468	2010 VD_{172}	—	November 10, 2010	Mount Lemmon	Mount Lemmon Survey	L4	7.9 km	MPC · JPL
546469	2010 VH_{172}	—	November 10, 2010	Mount Lemmon	Mount Lemmon Survey	·	2.0 km	MPC · JPL
546470	2010 VD_{175}	—	October 30, 2010	Kitt Peak	Spacewatch	EMA	3.1 km	MPC · JPL
546471 Szipál	2010 VQ_{176}	Szipál	November 1, 2010	Piszkéstető	K. Sárneczky, Z. Kuli	·	2.8 km	MPC · JPL
546472	2010 VF_{177}	—	October 14, 2010	Mount Lemmon	Mount Lemmon Survey	·	1.9 km	MPC · JPL
546473	2010 VV_{177}	—	July 29, 2009	Kitt Peak	Spacewatch	·	3.4 km	MPC · JPL
546474	2010 VV_{178}	—	November 11, 2010	Mount Lemmon	Mount Lemmon Survey	·	3.0 km	MPC · JPL
546475	2010 VH_{179}	—	November 11, 2010	Mount Lemmon	Mount Lemmon Survey	·	2.3 km	MPC · JPL
546476	2010 VK_{179}	—	November 11, 2010	Mount Lemmon	Mount Lemmon Survey	·	720 m	MPC · JPL
546477	2010 VL_{179}	—	November 11, 2010	Mount Lemmon	Mount Lemmon Survey	EOS	2.0 km	MPC · JPL
546478	2010 VP_{180}	—	November 11, 2010	Mount Lemmon	Mount Lemmon Survey	·	1.1 km	MPC · JPL
546479	2010 VD_{183}	—	March 9, 2002	Kitt Peak	Spacewatch	·	2.1 km	MPC · JPL
546480	2010 VT_{183}	—	November 12, 2010	Kitt Peak	Spacewatch	·	3.2 km	MPC · JPL
546481	2010 VQ_{185}	—	October 30, 2010	Mount Lemmon	Mount Lemmon Survey	·	2.4 km	MPC · JPL
546482	2010 VB_{187}	—	November 13, 2010	Vail-Jarnac	Glinos, T.	·	2.4 km	MPC · JPL
546483	2010 VE_{188}	—	November 13, 2010	Mount Lemmon	Mount Lemmon Survey	·	2.7 km	MPC · JPL
546484	2010 VM_{188}	—	November 13, 2010	Kitt Peak	Spacewatch	·	620 m	MPC · JPL
546485	2010 VX_{189}	—	September 18, 2010	Mount Lemmon	Mount Lemmon Survey	·	2.0 km	MPC · JPL
546486	2010 VD_{191}	—	January 18, 2001	Haleakala	NEAT	·	3.9 km	MPC · JPL
546487	2010 VE_{191}	—	November 8, 2010	Catalina	CSS	·	2.9 km	MPC · JPL
546488	2010 VN_{191}	—	January 19, 2007	Mauna Kea	P. A. Wiegert	·	2.1 km	MPC · JPL
546489	2010 VV_{191}	—	November 11, 2010	Kitt Peak	Spacewatch	·	3.0 km	MPC · JPL
546490	2010 VR_{192}	—	October 30, 2010	Kitt Peak	Spacewatch	L4	10 km	MPC · JPL
546491	2010 VK_{193}	—	September 15, 2009	Kitt Peak	Spacewatch	L4	7.7 km	MPC · JPL
546492	2010 VX_{195}	—	April 20, 2009	Kitt Peak	Spacewatch	V	520 m	MPC · JPL
546493	2010 VC_{203}	—	September 18, 2009	Catalina	CSS	L4	10 km	MPC · JPL
546494	2010 VG_{203}	—	December 3, 2010	Mount Lemmon	Mount Lemmon Survey	·	2.5 km	MPC · JPL
546495	2010 VJ_{203}	—	September 20, 2003	Palomar	NEAT	V	560 m	MPC · JPL
546496	2010 VW_{205}	—	September 18, 2003	Palomar	NEAT	·	570 m	MPC · JPL
546497	2010 VN_{206}	—	March 10, 2002	Kitt Peak	Spacewatch	·	950 m	MPC · JPL
546498 Demjénferenc	2010 VQ_{206}	Demjénferenc	October 31, 2010	Piszkéstető	S. Kürti, K. Sárneczky	·	3.1 km	MPC · JPL
546499	2010 VY_{206}	—	December 26, 2011	Kitt Peak	Spacewatch	·	2.5 km	MPC · JPL
546500	2010 VV_{207}	—	March 10, 2002	Kitt Peak	Spacewatch	·	790 m	MPC · JPL

== 546501–546600 ==
back to top

Designation			Discovery			Properties		Ref
Permanent	Provisional	Named after	Date	Site	Discoverer(s)	Category	Diam.	Ref
546501	2010 VM_{209}	—	October 11, 2010	Mount Lemmon	Mount Lemmon Survey	·	3.1 km	MPC · JPL
546502	2010 VR_{209}	—	December 5, 2010	Mount Lemmon	Mount Lemmon Survey	·	760 m	MPC · JPL
546503	2010 VF_{210}	—	October 8, 2010	Catalina	CSS	·	2.1 km	MPC · JPL
546504	2010 VH_{210}	—	October 15, 2010	Mayhill-ISON	L. Elenin	EOS	1.8 km	MPC · JPL
546505	2010 VU_{210}	—	September 17, 2003	Kitt Peak	Spacewatch	(2076)	490 m	MPC · JPL
546506	2010 VJ_{211}	—	November 9, 2010	Catalina	CSS	EOS	1.7 km	MPC · JPL
546507	2010 VS_{211}	—	October 13, 1999	Apache Point	SDSS	·	950 m	MPC · JPL
546508	2010 VJ_{212}	—	November 3, 2010	Mayhill-ISON	L. Elenin	·	3.6 km	MPC · JPL
546509	2010 VK_{212}	—	February 13, 2012	Haleakala	Pan-STARRS 1	·	2.9 km	MPC · JPL
546510	2010 VC_{213}	—	September 25, 2003	Palomar	NEAT	·	770 m	MPC · JPL
546511	2010 VD_{215}	—	October 10, 2010	Kitt Peak	Spacewatch	·	3.0 km	MPC · JPL
546512	2010 VZ_{215}	—	October 18, 2010	Mount Lemmon	Mount Lemmon Survey	L4	8.0 km	MPC · JPL
546513	2010 VB_{216}	—	November 4, 2010	Palomar	Palomar Transient Factory	·	3.2 km	MPC · JPL
546514	2010 VX_{216}	—	November 28, 2010	Kitt Peak	Spacewatch	·	1.0 km	MPC · JPL
546515 Almásy	2010 VY_{216}	Almásy	October 31, 2010	Piszkéstető	K. Sárneczky, Z. Kuli	·	4.4 km	MPC · JPL
546516	2010 VA_{217}	—	March 31, 2008	Mount Lemmon	Mount Lemmon Survey	·	2.2 km	MPC · JPL
546517	2010 VE_{217}	—	August 22, 2004	Kitt Peak	Spacewatch	·	2.5 km	MPC · JPL
546518	2010 VL_{217}	—	September 11, 2004	Kitt Peak	Spacewatch	·	2.0 km	MPC · JPL
546519	2010 VS_{217}	—	November 2, 2010	Mount Lemmon	Mount Lemmon Survey	·	1.9 km	MPC · JPL
546520	2010 VF_{219}	—	November 14, 2010	Catalina	CSS	·	1.7 km	MPC · JPL
546521	2010 VT_{219}	—	November 1, 2010	Mount Lemmon	Mount Lemmon Survey	·	2.1 km	MPC · JPL
546522	2010 VY_{219}	—	November 3, 2010	Mount Lemmon	Mount Lemmon Survey	·	2.5 km	MPC · JPL
546523	2010 VL_{222}	—	October 17, 2010	Mount Lemmon	Mount Lemmon Survey	·	2.3 km	MPC · JPL
546524	2010 VV_{223}	—	October 12, 2010	Mount Lemmon	Mount Lemmon Survey	·	470 m	MPC · JPL
546525	2010 VK_{225}	—	November 6, 2010	Mount Lemmon	Mount Lemmon Survey	L4	7.7 km	MPC · JPL
546526	2010 VM_{225}	—	November 1, 2010	Mount Lemmon	Mount Lemmon Survey	L4	7.2 km	MPC · JPL
546527	2010 VO_{225}	—	November 5, 2010	Mount Lemmon	Mount Lemmon Survey	L4	9.9 km	MPC · JPL
546528	2010 VM_{226}	—	October 29, 2010	Kitt Peak	Spacewatch	·	2.8 km	MPC · JPL
546529	2010 VA_{228}	—	October 1, 2005	Mount Lemmon	Mount Lemmon Survey	EOS	1.5 km	MPC · JPL
546530	2010 VB_{228}	—	January 30, 2008	Kitt Peak	Spacewatch	·	570 m	MPC · JPL
546531	2010 VS_{228}	—	December 1, 2011	ESA OGS	ESA OGS	·	3.6 km	MPC · JPL
546532	2010 VT_{228}	—	November 1, 2010	Mount Lemmon	Mount Lemmon Survey	·	2.6 km	MPC · JPL
546533	2010 VC_{229}	—	November 6, 2010	Kitt Peak	Spacewatch	·	610 m	MPC · JPL
546534	2010 VL_{229}	—	February 3, 2012	Mount Lemmon	Mount Lemmon Survey	·	2.9 km	MPC · JPL
546535	2010 VM_{229}	—	November 15, 2010	Mount Lemmon	Mount Lemmon Survey	VER	2.6 km	MPC · JPL
546536	2010 VO_{229}	—	August 14, 2013	Haleakala	Pan-STARRS 1	·	630 m	MPC · JPL
546537	2010 VQ_{229}	—	November 14, 2010	Catalina	CSS	H	480 m	MPC · JPL
546538	2010 VS_{229}	—	November 5, 2010	Mount Lemmon	Mount Lemmon Survey	·	3.0 km	MPC · JPL
546539	2010 VV_{229}	—	January 30, 2012	Mount Lemmon	Mount Lemmon Survey	·	2.5 km	MPC · JPL
546540	2010 VK_{230}	—	December 26, 2011	Kitt Peak	Spacewatch	·	3.5 km	MPC · JPL
546541	2010 VR_{230}	—	February 16, 2012	Haleakala	Pan-STARRS 1	V	500 m	MPC · JPL
546542	2010 VV_{230}	—	November 1, 2010	Mount Lemmon	Mount Lemmon Survey	·	2.3 km	MPC · JPL
546543	2010 VB_{231}	—	November 1, 2010	Kitt Peak	Spacewatch	L4	8.7 km	MPC · JPL
546544	2010 VO_{231}	—	November 12, 2010	Mount Lemmon	Mount Lemmon Survey	·	2.7 km	MPC · JPL
546545	2010 VU_{231}	—	November 11, 2010	Mount Lemmon	Mount Lemmon Survey	EOS	1.5 km	MPC · JPL
546546	2010 VV_{231}	—	November 6, 2010	Kitt Peak	Spacewatch	·	1.8 km	MPC · JPL
546547	2010 VX_{231}	—	January 19, 2012	Kitt Peak	Spacewatch	·	2.0 km	MPC · JPL
546548	2010 VZ_{231}	—	April 12, 2013	Haleakala	Pan-STARRS 1	·	2.5 km	MPC · JPL
546549	2010 VR_{232}	—	December 5, 2005	Mount Lemmon	Mount Lemmon Survey	·	2.5 km	MPC · JPL
546550	2010 VZ_{232}	—	March 13, 2013	Catalina	CSS	·	2.8 km	MPC · JPL
546551	2010 VC_{233}	—	November 3, 2010	Mount Lemmon	Mount Lemmon Survey	·	680 m	MPC · JPL
546552	2010 VQ_{233}	—	August 20, 2014	Haleakala	Pan-STARRS 1	·	1.4 km	MPC · JPL
546553	2010 VD_{234}	—	July 13, 2013	Haleakala	Pan-STARRS 1	·	550 m	MPC · JPL
546554	2010 VQ_{234}	—	December 28, 2005	Kitt Peak	Spacewatch	EOS	1.7 km	MPC · JPL
546555	2010 VC_{235}	—	November 2, 2010	Mount Lemmon	Mount Lemmon Survey	·	2.5 km	MPC · JPL
546556	2010 VL_{235}	—	July 1, 2014	Haleakala	Pan-STARRS 1	·	2.3 km	MPC · JPL
546557	2010 VJ_{236}	—	September 11, 2010	Mount Lemmon	Mount Lemmon Survey	·	540 m	MPC · JPL
546558	2010 VZ_{237}	—	November 2, 2010	Mount Lemmon	Mount Lemmon Survey	·	1.8 km	MPC · JPL
546559	2010 VP_{238}	—	November 11, 2010	Mount Lemmon	Mount Lemmon Survey	·	3.0 km	MPC · JPL
546560	2010 VA_{239}	—	November 8, 2010	Mount Lemmon	Mount Lemmon Survey	VER	2.0 km	MPC · JPL
546561	2010 VL_{239}	—	December 29, 2011	Mount Lemmon	Mount Lemmon Survey	·	2.3 km	MPC · JPL
546562	2010 VM_{239}	—	November 14, 2010	Mount Lemmon	Mount Lemmon Survey	·	2.7 km	MPC · JPL
546563	2010 VO_{239}	—	April 10, 2013	Mount Lemmon	Mount Lemmon Survey	·	3.0 km	MPC · JPL
546564	2010 VX_{239}	—	November 13, 2010	Kitt Peak	Spacewatch	·	1.1 km	MPC · JPL
546565	2010 VB_{240}	—	January 13, 2018	Mount Lemmon	Mount Lemmon Survey	VER	2.4 km	MPC · JPL
546566	2010 VM_{240}	—	November 10, 2010	Mount Lemmon	Mount Lemmon Survey	·	2.5 km	MPC · JPL
546567	2010 VS_{240}	—	November 11, 2010	Mount Lemmon	Mount Lemmon Survey	·	2.3 km	MPC · JPL
546568	2010 VY_{240}	—	September 5, 2010	Mount Lemmon	Mount Lemmon Survey	·	2.9 km	MPC · JPL
546569	2010 VM_{241}	—	January 19, 2012	Haleakala	Pan-STARRS 1	·	1.9 km	MPC · JPL
546570	2010 VV_{241}	—	November 2, 2010	Mount Lemmon	Mount Lemmon Survey	·	2.8 km	MPC · JPL
546571	2010 VK_{242}	—	November 13, 2010	Kitt Peak	Spacewatch	EOS	2.1 km	MPC · JPL
546572	2010 VW_{243}	—	November 2, 2010	Mount Lemmon	Mount Lemmon Survey	·	2.3 km	MPC · JPL
546573	2010 VX_{243}	—	November 6, 2010	Mount Lemmon	Mount Lemmon Survey	L4	7.8 km	MPC · JPL
546574	2010 VZ_{243}	—	April 10, 2013	Haleakala	Pan-STARRS 1	·	2.5 km	MPC · JPL
546575	2010 VB_{244}	—	November 1, 2010	Kitt Peak	Spacewatch	·	2.9 km	MPC · JPL
546576	2010 VD_{244}	—	November 11, 2010	Kitt Peak	Spacewatch	·	630 m	MPC · JPL
546577	2010 VH_{244}	—	January 19, 2012	Haleakala	Pan-STARRS 1	·	660 m	MPC · JPL
546578	2010 VN_{244}	—	September 11, 2015	Haleakala	Pan-STARRS 1	·	2.2 km	MPC · JPL
546579	2010 VT_{244}	—	January 17, 2013	Haleakala	Pan-STARRS 1	L4	6.5 km	MPC · JPL
546580	2010 VZ_{244}	—	November 11, 2010	Kitt Peak	Spacewatch	·	2.7 km	MPC · JPL
546581	2010 VG_{245}	—	November 4, 2010	Mount Lemmon	Mount Lemmon Survey	EOS	1.5 km	MPC · JPL
546582	2010 VM_{245}	—	November 13, 2010	Mount Lemmon	Mount Lemmon Survey	·	2.3 km	MPC · JPL
546583	2010 VY_{245}	—	November 13, 2010	Mount Lemmon	Mount Lemmon Survey	·	2.4 km	MPC · JPL
546584	2010 VE_{246}	—	November 8, 2010	Mount Lemmon	Mount Lemmon Survey	·	2.5 km	MPC · JPL
546585	2010 VM_{246}	—	January 8, 2010	WISE	WISE	L4	9.9 km	MPC · JPL
546586	2010 VQ_{246}	—	September 17, 2010	Mount Lemmon	Mount Lemmon Survey	·	2.0 km	MPC · JPL
546587	2010 VK_{247}	—	February 5, 2013	Mount Lemmon	Mount Lemmon Survey	L4	7.2 km	MPC · JPL
546588	2010 VO_{247}	—	November 12, 2010	Kitt Peak	Spacewatch	L4	7.2 km	MPC · JPL
546589	2010 VR_{248}	—	July 13, 2013	Haleakala	Pan-STARRS 1	·	620 m	MPC · JPL
546590	2010 VE_{249}	—	November 1, 2010	Kitt Peak	Spacewatch	L4 · ERY	6.6 km	MPC · JPL
546591	2010 VF_{249}	—	November 3, 2010	Kitt Peak	Spacewatch	·	1.7 km	MPC · JPL
546592	2010 VG_{249}	—	November 2, 2010	Mount Lemmon	Mount Lemmon Survey	L4 · ERY	6.3 km	MPC · JPL
546593	2010 VJ_{249}	—	November 7, 2010	Kitt Peak	Spacewatch	L4	8.1 km	MPC · JPL
546594	2010 VL_{249}	—	November 12, 2010	Kitt Peak	Spacewatch	L4	7.1 km	MPC · JPL
546595	2010 VO_{250}	—	November 10, 2010	Kitt Peak	Spacewatch	·	2.8 km	MPC · JPL
546596	2010 VP_{250}	—	November 10, 2010	Mount Lemmon	Mount Lemmon Survey	PAD	1.2 km	MPC · JPL
546597	2010 VR_{250}	—	November 4, 2010	Mount Lemmon	Mount Lemmon Survey	V	440 m	MPC · JPL
546598	2010 VA_{251}	—	November 10, 2010	Mount Lemmon	Mount Lemmon Survey	·	1.5 km	MPC · JPL
546599	2010 VF_{251}	—	November 3, 2010	Mount Lemmon	Mount Lemmon Survey	·	670 m	MPC · JPL
546600	2010 VO_{251}	—	November 2, 2010	Mount Lemmon	Mount Lemmon Survey	·	2.8 km	MPC · JPL

== 546601–546700 ==
back to top

Designation			Discovery			Properties		Ref
Permanent	Provisional	Named after	Date	Site	Discoverer(s)	Category	Diam.	Ref
546601	2010 VW_{251}	—	November 6, 2010	Kitt Peak	Spacewatch	·	600 m	MPC · JPL
546602	2010 VG_{252}	—	November 7, 2010	Mount Lemmon	Mount Lemmon Survey	·	780 m	MPC · JPL
546603	2010 WG	—	November 17, 2010	Kitt Peak	Spacewatch	·	1.9 km	MPC · JPL
546604	2010 WV_{1}	—	April 14, 2008	Kitt Peak	Spacewatch	·	2.5 km	MPC · JPL
546605	2010 WL_{2}	—	April 29, 2008	Mount Lemmon	Mount Lemmon Survey	·	3.4 km	MPC · JPL
546606	2010 WT_{2}	—	November 26, 2010	Mount Lemmon	Mount Lemmon Survey	·	2.3 km	MPC · JPL
546607	2010 WQ_{3}	—	October 9, 2004	Kitt Peak	Spacewatch	·	3.3 km	MPC · JPL
546608	2010 WT_{3}	—	October 28, 2010	Mount Lemmon	Mount Lemmon Survey	·	2.4 km	MPC · JPL
546609	2010 WC_{4}	—	August 12, 2004	Palomar	NEAT	·	3.0 km	MPC · JPL
546610	2010 WQ_{6}	—	November 7, 2010	Mount Lemmon	Mount Lemmon Survey	·	1.9 km	MPC · JPL
546611	2010 WT_{6}	—	November 30, 2005	Kitt Peak	Spacewatch	·	1.6 km	MPC · JPL
546612	2010 WU_{6}	—	November 27, 2010	Mount Lemmon	Mount Lemmon Survey	·	2.3 km	MPC · JPL
546613	2010 WM_{8}	—	November 14, 2010	Kitt Peak	Spacewatch	·	2.1 km	MPC · JPL
546614	2010 WX_{8}	—	December 1, 2010	Magdalena Ridge	Ryan, W. H.	H	520 m	MPC · JPL
546615	2010 WF_{9}	—	October 9, 2004	Kitt Peak	Spacewatch	·	3.6 km	MPC · JPL
546616	2010 WK_{9}	—	October 30, 2010	Kitt Peak	Spacewatch	·	3.1 km	MPC · JPL
546617	2010 WT_{9}	—	November 5, 2010	Mount Lemmon	Mount Lemmon Survey	·	2.1 km	MPC · JPL
546618	2010 WT_{10}	—	September 22, 2009	Kitt Peak	Spacewatch	L4	7.5 km	MPC · JPL
546619	2010 WD_{11}	—	November 15, 2010	Mount Lemmon	Mount Lemmon Survey	·	3.6 km	MPC · JPL
546620	2010 WE_{11}	—	November 16, 2010	Mount Lemmon	Mount Lemmon Survey	EOS	1.8 km	MPC · JPL
546621	2010 WG_{11}	—	November 15, 2010	Mount Lemmon	Mount Lemmon Survey	·	2.5 km	MPC · JPL
546622	2010 WN_{11}	—	October 30, 2010	Mount Lemmon	Mount Lemmon Survey	·	1.5 km	MPC · JPL
546623	2010 WE_{13}	—	November 12, 2010	Mount Lemmon	Mount Lemmon Survey	L4	9.3 km	MPC · JPL
546624	2010 WL_{13}	—	November 26, 2010	Mount Lemmon	Mount Lemmon Survey	·	2.4 km	MPC · JPL
546625	2010 WE_{14}	—	December 21, 2005	Kitt Peak	Spacewatch	·	1.4 km	MPC · JPL
546626	2010 WK_{14}	—	November 1, 2010	Kitt Peak	Spacewatch	EOS	1.8 km	MPC · JPL
546627	2010 WX_{14}	—	September 17, 2009	Kitt Peak	Spacewatch	L4	8.9 km	MPC · JPL
546628	2010 WE_{16}	—	November 26, 2010	Zadko	Todd, M.	TIR	2.5 km	MPC · JPL
546629	2010 WT_{20}	—	April 7, 2005	Kitt Peak	Spacewatch	V	520 m	MPC · JPL
546630	2010 WG_{24}	—	October 29, 2010	Kitt Peak	Spacewatch	EOS	1.9 km	MPC · JPL
546631	2010 WX_{24}	—	November 27, 2010	Mount Lemmon	Mount Lemmon Survey	·	740 m	MPC · JPL
546632	2010 WM_{27}	—	April 4, 2008	Catalina	CSS	·	860 m	MPC · JPL
546633	2010 WO_{27}	—	November 6, 2010	Kitt Peak	Spacewatch	·	1.7 km	MPC · JPL
546634	2010 WK_{28}	—	November 27, 2010	Mount Lemmon	Mount Lemmon Survey	LIX	3.4 km	MPC · JPL
546635	2010 WY_{28}	—	November 27, 2010	Mount Lemmon	Mount Lemmon Survey	PHO	880 m	MPC · JPL
546636	2010 WM_{31}	—	September 17, 2009	Kitt Peak	Spacewatch	L4	8.7 km	MPC · JPL
546637	2010 WO_{31}	—	November 27, 2010	Mount Lemmon	Mount Lemmon Survey	·	630 m	MPC · JPL
546638	2010 WQ_{32}	—	August 31, 2006	Needville	Garossino, P. G. A.	·	670 m	MPC · JPL
546639	2010 WF_{33}	—	November 11, 2010	Mount Lemmon	Mount Lemmon Survey	·	3.0 km	MPC · JPL
546640	2010 WR_{33}	—	November 13, 2010	Kitt Peak	Spacewatch	·	1.1 km	MPC · JPL
546641	2010 WC_{34}	—	November 13, 2010	Kitt Peak	Spacewatch	·	2.7 km	MPC · JPL
546642	2010 WG_{34}	—	November 11, 2010	Mount Lemmon	Mount Lemmon Survey	·	3.0 km	MPC · JPL
546643	2010 WL_{34}	—	May 5, 2008	Mount Lemmon	Mount Lemmon Survey	EOS	2.0 km	MPC · JPL
546644	2010 WD_{36}	—	November 27, 2010	Mount Lemmon	Mount Lemmon Survey	·	1.9 km	MPC · JPL
546645	2010 WE_{36}	—	November 27, 2010	Mount Lemmon	Mount Lemmon Survey	·	3.0 km	MPC · JPL
546646	2010 WG_{36}	—	September 18, 2006	Kitt Peak	Spacewatch	·	850 m	MPC · JPL
546647	2010 WS_{36}	—	May 3, 1994	Kitt Peak	Spacewatch	·	1.0 km	MPC · JPL
546648	2010 WG_{37}	—	November 27, 2010	Mount Lemmon	Mount Lemmon Survey	V	560 m	MPC · JPL
546649	2010 WV_{37}	—	November 12, 2010	Kitt Peak	Spacewatch	·	2.7 km	MPC · JPL
546650	2010 WJ_{40}	—	November 27, 2010	Mount Lemmon	Mount Lemmon Survey	·	2.1 km	MPC · JPL
546651	2010 WR_{40}	—	October 19, 2006	Catalina	CSS	V	730 m	MPC · JPL
546652	2010 WT_{40}	—	November 18, 2003	Kitt Peak	Spacewatch	·	620 m	MPC · JPL
546653	2010 WJ_{41}	—	September 21, 2009	Kitt Peak	Spacewatch	L4	6.8 km	MPC · JPL
546654	2010 WM_{42}	—	November 7, 2010	Kitt Peak	Spacewatch	L4	7.8 km	MPC · JPL
546655	2010 WB_{44}	—	November 27, 2010	Mount Lemmon	Mount Lemmon Survey	·	2.6 km	MPC · JPL
546656	2010 WR_{44}	—	November 12, 2010	Kitt Peak	Spacewatch	·	2.5 km	MPC · JPL
546657	2010 WP_{45}	—	February 11, 2004	Kitt Peak	Spacewatch	MAS	610 m	MPC · JPL
546658	2010 WZ_{45}	—	November 6, 2010	Kitt Peak	Spacewatch	·	3.1 km	MPC · JPL
546659	2010 WX_{48}	—	January 10, 2006	Mount Lemmon	Mount Lemmon Survey	·	3.1 km	MPC · JPL
546660	2010 WZ_{48}	—	October 10, 2004	Kitt Peak	Deep Ecliptic Survey	·	1.7 km	MPC · JPL
546661	2010 WN_{51}	—	March 12, 2007	Mount Lemmon	Mount Lemmon Survey	·	2.9 km	MPC · JPL
546662	2010 WX_{51}	—	March 10, 2007	Mount Lemmon	Mount Lemmon Survey	·	2.3 km	MPC · JPL
546663	2010 WB_{53}	—	March 11, 2007	Kitt Peak	Spacewatch	·	3.4 km	MPC · JPL
546664	2010 WC_{53}	—	February 25, 2007	Kitt Peak	Spacewatch	·	3.8 km	MPC · JPL
546665	2010 WP_{53}	—	November 11, 2010	Kitt Peak	Spacewatch	·	1.5 km	MPC · JPL
546666	2010 WP_{56}	—	February 17, 2004	Kitt Peak	Spacewatch	·	1.3 km	MPC · JPL
546667	2010 WW_{56}	—	November 8, 2010	Mount Lemmon	Mount Lemmon Survey	L4	7.4 km	MPC · JPL
546668	2010 WY_{56}	—	November 8, 2010	Mount Lemmon	Mount Lemmon Survey	L4	8.7 km	MPC · JPL
546669	2010 WF_{57}	—	November 6, 2005	Mount Lemmon	Mount Lemmon Survey	VER	3.3 km	MPC · JPL
546670	2010 WR_{58}	—	November 30, 2010	Mount Lemmon	Mount Lemmon Survey	·	2.7 km	MPC · JPL
546671	2010 WW_{58}	—	October 13, 2010	Mount Lemmon	Mount Lemmon Survey	·	3.4 km	MPC · JPL
546672	2010 WR_{59}	—	November 26, 2003	Kitt Peak	Spacewatch	·	590 m	MPC · JPL
546673	2010 WR_{60}	—	November 5, 2010	Les Engarouines	L. Bernasconi	·	2.4 km	MPC · JPL
546674	2010 WW_{60}	—	May 13, 2007	Kitt Peak	Spacewatch	TIR	2.5 km	MPC · JPL
546675	2010 WB_{65}	—	November 28, 2010	Mount Lemmon	Mount Lemmon Survey	·	2.9 km	MPC · JPL
546676	2010 WQ_{65}	—	August 20, 2006	Palomar	NEAT	·	740 m	MPC · JPL
546677	2010 WR_{65}	—	November 28, 2010	Mount Lemmon	Mount Lemmon Survey	·	2.9 km	MPC · JPL
546678	2010 WA_{67}	—	October 5, 2004	Palomar	NEAT	·	3.4 km	MPC · JPL
546679	2010 WU_{69}	—	September 17, 2004	Kitt Peak	Spacewatch	·	2.4 km	MPC · JPL
546680	2010 WM_{70}	—	October 28, 2010	Mount Lemmon	Mount Lemmon Survey	·	2.8 km	MPC · JPL
546681	2010 WR_{70}	—	November 28, 2010	Mount Lemmon	Mount Lemmon Survey	EOS	2.2 km	MPC · JPL
546682	2010 WN_{72}	—	December 1, 2005	Mount Lemmon	Mount Lemmon Survey	·	2.1 km	MPC · JPL
546683	2010 WG_{73}	—	November 12, 2010	Kitt Peak	Spacewatch	VER	2.6 km	MPC · JPL
546684	2010 WP_{73}	—	November 30, 2010	Mount Lemmon	Mount Lemmon Survey	·	880 m	MPC · JPL
546685	2010 WU_{73}	—	March 31, 2008	Mount Lemmon	Mount Lemmon Survey	·	3.5 km	MPC · JPL
546686	2010 WU_{75}	—	November 27, 2010	Mount Lemmon	Mount Lemmon Survey	·	3.0 km	MPC · JPL
546687	2010 WT_{76}	—	November 1, 2015	Haleakala	Pan-STARRS 1	EUP	3.7 km	MPC · JPL
546688	2010 WU_{76}	—	November 30, 2010	Mount Lemmon	Mount Lemmon Survey	·	2.6 km	MPC · JPL
546689	2010 WY_{76}	—	January 4, 2013	Kitt Peak	Spacewatch	L4	8.0 km	MPC · JPL
546690	2010 WM_{77}	—	November 27, 2010	Mount Lemmon	Mount Lemmon Survey	L4	7.9 km	MPC · JPL
546691	2010 WP_{77}	—	November 27, 2010	Mount Lemmon	Mount Lemmon Survey	L4	6.8 km	MPC · JPL
546692	2010 WA_{78}	—	January 18, 2013	Mount Lemmon	Mount Lemmon Survey	L4	6.8 km	MPC · JPL
546693	2010 WF_{78}	—	November 17, 2010	Kitt Peak	Spacewatch	L4	9.2 km	MPC · JPL
546694	2010 XV_{1}	—	December 1, 2010	Mount Lemmon	Mount Lemmon Survey	EOS	1.5 km	MPC · JPL
546695	2010 XA_{2}	—	November 8, 2010	Kitt Peak	Spacewatch	·	3.0 km	MPC · JPL
546696	2010 XE_{2}	—	October 19, 2006	Mount Lemmon	Mount Lemmon Survey	·	1.3 km	MPC · JPL
546697	2010 XM_{3}	—	October 17, 2010	Catalina	CSS	·	2.5 km	MPC · JPL
546698	2010 XG_{5}	—	November 1, 2010	Kitt Peak	Spacewatch	·	2.8 km	MPC · JPL
546699	2010 XZ_{5}	—	November 12, 2010	Mount Lemmon	Mount Lemmon Survey	·	2.2 km	MPC · JPL
546700	2010 XQ_{7}	—	September 17, 2006	Kitt Peak	Spacewatch	·	980 m	MPC · JPL

== 546701–546800 ==
back to top

Designation			Discovery			Properties		Ref
Permanent	Provisional	Named after	Date	Site	Discoverer(s)	Category	Diam.	Ref
546701	2010 XY_{10}	—	November 4, 2004	Socorro	LINEAR	EUP	4.6 km	MPC · JPL
546702	2010 XH_{13}	—	November 13, 2010	Mount Lemmon	Mount Lemmon Survey	·	660 m	MPC · JPL
546703	2010 XK_{15}	—	December 19, 2003	Socorro	LINEAR	·	730 m	MPC · JPL
546704	2010 XO_{15}	—	December 2, 2010	Kitt Peak	Spacewatch	·	990 m	MPC · JPL
546705	2010 XL_{16}	—	November 11, 2010	Mount Lemmon	Mount Lemmon Survey	·	1.9 km	MPC · JPL
546706	2010 XV_{16}	—	December 2, 2010	Kitt Peak	Spacewatch	(21885)	3.3 km	MPC · JPL
546707	2010 XC_{17}	—	December 2, 2010	Kitt Peak	Spacewatch	EOS	2.0 km	MPC · JPL
546708	2010 XS_{17}	—	December 2, 2010	Kitt Peak	Spacewatch	·	1.6 km	MPC · JPL
546709	2010 XF_{19}	—	April 13, 2002	Palomar	NEAT	·	700 m	MPC · JPL
546710	2010 XM_{20}	—	September 5, 2010	Mount Lemmon	Mount Lemmon Survey	·	3.0 km	MPC · JPL
546711	2010 XD_{21}	—	December 1, 2010	Mount Lemmon	Mount Lemmon Survey	H	400 m	MPC · JPL
546712	2010 XP_{21}	—	September 19, 2003	Palomar	NEAT	·	880 m	MPC · JPL
546713	2010 XT_{21}	—	December 2, 2010	Catalina	CSS	·	2.3 km	MPC · JPL
546714	2010 XW_{22}	—	November 1, 2010	Kitt Peak	Spacewatch	·	1.7 km	MPC · JPL
546715	2010 XT_{25}	—	November 4, 2010	Mayhill-ISON	L. Elenin	L4	10 km	MPC · JPL
546716	2010 XU_{27}	—	December 1, 2010	Mount Lemmon	Mount Lemmon Survey	·	2.3 km	MPC · JPL
546717	2010 XX_{27}	—	December 1, 2010	Mount Lemmon	Mount Lemmon Survey	·	2.0 km	MPC · JPL
546718	2010 XJ_{28}	—	December 1, 2010	Mount Lemmon	Mount Lemmon Survey	·	1.6 km	MPC · JPL
546719	2010 XC_{30}	—	October 10, 2002	Apache Point	SDSS Collaboration	·	1.1 km	MPC · JPL
546720	2010 XJ_{32}	—	May 4, 2002	Palomar	NEAT	·	3.2 km	MPC · JPL
546721	2010 XY_{32}	—	December 2, 2010	Mount Lemmon	Mount Lemmon Survey	·	760 m	MPC · JPL
546722	2010 XN_{34}	—	April 6, 2008	Mount Lemmon	Mount Lemmon Survey	·	3.0 km	MPC · JPL
546723	2010 XB_{36}	—	October 7, 2004	Palomar	NEAT	URS	4.1 km	MPC · JPL
546724	2010 XZ_{36}	—	December 3, 2010	Mount Lemmon	Mount Lemmon Survey	·	3.9 km	MPC · JPL
546725	2010 XP_{42}	—	January 27, 2006	Kitt Peak	Spacewatch	EOS	1.8 km	MPC · JPL
546726	2010 XH_{43}	—	February 24, 2006	Mount Lemmon	Mount Lemmon Survey	·	2.8 km	MPC · JPL
546727	2010 XR_{44}	—	October 30, 2010	Kitt Peak	Spacewatch	·	3.1 km	MPC · JPL
546728	2010 XA_{45}	—	October 31, 2005	Catalina	CSS	·	2.7 km	MPC · JPL
546729	2010 XO_{45}	—	October 19, 2006	Kitt Peak	Spacewatch	·	870 m	MPC · JPL
546730	2010 XD_{46}	—	December 4, 2010	Mount Lemmon	Mount Lemmon Survey	·	2.9 km	MPC · JPL
546731	2010 XE_{46}	—	December 4, 2010	Mount Lemmon	Mount Lemmon Survey	·	2.3 km	MPC · JPL
546732	2010 XL_{46}	—	December 4, 2010	Kislovodsk Mtn.	Romas, E. S.	EOS	1.7 km	MPC · JPL
546733	2010 XW_{47}	—	November 1, 2010	Mount Lemmon	Mount Lemmon Survey	·	2.2 km	MPC · JPL
546734	2010 XJ_{49}	—	November 23, 2003	Kitt Peak	Spacewatch	·	680 m	MPC · JPL
546735	2010 XY_{51}	—	November 10, 2010	Mount Lemmon	Mount Lemmon Survey	PHO	1.1 km	MPC · JPL
546736	2010 XZ_{52}	—	November 11, 2010	Mount Lemmon	Mount Lemmon Survey	·	2.9 km	MPC · JPL
546737	2010 XF_{53}	—	October 13, 2010	Mount Lemmon	Mount Lemmon Survey	·	2.5 km	MPC · JPL
546738	2010 XV_{53}	—	November 5, 2010	Kitt Peak	Spacewatch	·	700 m	MPC · JPL
546739	2010 XW_{53}	—	November 11, 2010	Mount Lemmon	Mount Lemmon Survey	·	1.9 km	MPC · JPL
546740	2010 XX_{53}	—	December 6, 2010	Mount Lemmon	Mount Lemmon Survey	·	3.5 km	MPC · JPL
546741	2010 XX_{54}	—	December 8, 2010	Kitt Peak	Spacewatch	·	2.4 km	MPC · JPL
546742	2010 XR_{55}	—	November 7, 2005	Mauna Kea	A. Boattini	·	2.5 km	MPC · JPL
546743	2010 XG_{59}	—	December 8, 2010	Kitt Peak	Spacewatch	L4	6.8 km	MPC · JPL
546744	2010 XN_{59}	—	July 28, 2008	Mount Lemmon	Mount Lemmon Survey	·	3.5 km	MPC · JPL
546745	2010 XR_{61}	—	April 1, 2008	Kitt Peak	Spacewatch	EOS	1.8 km	MPC · JPL
546746	2010 XB_{63}	—	July 18, 2009	Sandlot	G. Hug	·	830 m	MPC · JPL
546747	2010 XF_{63}	—	September 25, 2009	Catalina	CSS	·	3.3 km	MPC · JPL
546748	2010 XU_{64}	—	November 15, 2010	Catalina	CSS	·	2.4 km	MPC · JPL
546749	2010 XG_{66}	—	December 10, 2010	Mount Lemmon	Mount Lemmon Survey	·	2.9 km	MPC · JPL
546750	2010 XQ_{66}	—	October 14, 2010	Mount Lemmon	Mount Lemmon Survey	·	3.6 km	MPC · JPL
546751	2010 XR_{66}	—	December 10, 2010	Bisei	BATTeRS	·	2.0 km	MPC · JPL
546752	2010 XO_{67}	—	November 14, 2010	Mount Lemmon	Mount Lemmon Survey	L4 · ERY	7.2 km	MPC · JPL
546753	2010 XT_{67}	—	June 1, 2002	Socorro	LINEAR	·	3.2 km	MPC · JPL
546754	2010 XA_{69}	—	December 14, 2010	Mount Lemmon	Mount Lemmon Survey	·	3.5 km	MPC · JPL
546755	2010 XG_{71}	—	December 10, 2005	Kitt Peak	Spacewatch	·	2.4 km	MPC · JPL
546756 Sunguoyou	2010 XL_{71}	Sunguoyou	December 9, 2010	Xingming	Xu, Z., X. Gao	·	1.2 km	MPC · JPL
546757	2010 XB_{72}	—	December 14, 2010	Mount Lemmon	Mount Lemmon Survey	·	4.2 km	MPC · JPL
546758	2010 XN_{73}	—	July 31, 2009	Kitt Peak	Spacewatch	HYG	2.7 km	MPC · JPL
546759	2010 XC_{74}	—	November 13, 2010	Mount Lemmon	Mount Lemmon Survey	·	850 m	MPC · JPL
546760	2010 XQ_{75}	—	September 22, 2009	Mount Lemmon	Mount Lemmon Survey	L4 · ERY	8.4 km	MPC · JPL
546761	2010 XS_{75}	—	September 19, 2006	Catalina	CSS	·	1.0 km	MPC · JPL
546762	2010 XX_{77}	—	December 3, 2010	Mount Lemmon	Mount Lemmon Survey	·	720 m	MPC · JPL
546763	2010 XC_{78}	—	December 4, 2010	Mount Lemmon	Mount Lemmon Survey	·	4.0 km	MPC · JPL
546764	2010 XE_{78}	—	January 4, 2000	Kitt Peak	Spacewatch	·	3.8 km	MPC · JPL
546765	2010 XE_{79}	—	September 16, 2009	Mount Lemmon	Mount Lemmon Survey	·	3.1 km	MPC · JPL
546766	2010 XL_{79}	—	November 12, 2010	Mount Lemmon	Mount Lemmon Survey	·	2.0 km	MPC · JPL
546767	2010 XY_{79}	—	September 1, 2005	Palomar	NEAT	EUN	1.5 km	MPC · JPL
546768	2010 XP_{80}	—	December 6, 2010	Mount Lemmon	Mount Lemmon Survey	·	2.4 km	MPC · JPL
546769	2010 XZ_{81}	—	May 8, 2008	Mount Lemmon	Mount Lemmon Survey	·	3.1 km	MPC · JPL
546770	2010 XE_{82}	—	December 2, 2010	Mount Lemmon	Mount Lemmon Survey	ELF	3.4 km	MPC · JPL
546771	2010 XD_{83}	—	December 9, 2010	Catalina	CSS	EUP	4.4 km	MPC · JPL
546772	2010 XO_{85}	—	December 4, 2010	Mount Lemmon	Mount Lemmon Survey	·	3.1 km	MPC · JPL
546773	2010 XV_{85}	—	December 6, 2010	Mount Lemmon	Mount Lemmon Survey	·	3.2 km	MPC · JPL
546774	2010 XK_{86}	—	August 26, 2006	Lulin	LUSS	·	1.1 km	MPC · JPL
546775	2010 XQ_{86}	—	December 13, 2004	Kitt Peak	Spacewatch	EOS	2.1 km	MPC · JPL
546776	2010 XB_{87}	—	December 15, 2010	Mount Lemmon	Mount Lemmon Survey	·	3.6 km	MPC · JPL
546777	2010 XF_{91}	—	November 6, 2010	Mount Lemmon	Mount Lemmon Survey	L4	6.8 km	MPC · JPL
546778	2010 XG_{91}	—	November 10, 2010	Mount Lemmon	Mount Lemmon Survey	L4	7.7 km	MPC · JPL
546779	2010 XH_{91}	—	January 14, 2012	Mount Lemmon	Mount Lemmon Survey	L4	7.5 km	MPC · JPL
546780	2010 XN_{91}	—	February 9, 2013	Haleakala	Pan-STARRS 1	L4	8.3 km	MPC · JPL
546781	2010 XR_{91}	—	November 30, 2010	Mount Lemmon	Mount Lemmon Survey	L4	10 km	MPC · JPL
546782	2010 XD_{92}	—	November 6, 2010	Kitt Peak	Spacewatch	EOS	1.7 km	MPC · JPL
546783	2010 XF_{92}	—	September 20, 2003	Kitt Peak	Spacewatch	·	2.8 km	MPC · JPL
546784	2010 XY_{92}	—	December 8, 2010	Kitt Peak	Spacewatch	·	1.0 km	MPC · JPL
546785	2010 XB_{94}	—	December 13, 2010	Mount Lemmon	Mount Lemmon Survey	·	2.2 km	MPC · JPL
546786	2010 XG_{94}	—	April 11, 2013	Kitt Peak	Spacewatch	·	3.1 km	MPC · JPL
546787	2010 XN_{94}	—	June 7, 2013	Haleakala	Pan-STARRS 1	·	2.5 km	MPC · JPL
546788	2010 XR_{94}	—	March 27, 2012	Haleakala	Pan-STARRS 1	·	2.5 km	MPC · JPL
546789	2010 XW_{94}	—	September 25, 2014	Mount Lemmon	Mount Lemmon Survey	·	890 m	MPC · JPL
546790	2010 XX_{94}	—	November 6, 2010	Kitt Peak	Spacewatch	·	3.6 km	MPC · JPL
546791	2010 XY_{94}	—	December 2, 2010	Mount Lemmon	Mount Lemmon Survey	·	570 m	MPC · JPL
546792	2010 XD_{95}	—	December 14, 2010	Mount Lemmon	Mount Lemmon Survey	HYG	2.7 km	MPC · JPL
546793	2010 XG_{95}	—	January 15, 2015	Haleakala	Pan-STARRS 1	·	760 m	MPC · JPL
546794	2010 XH_{95}	—	April 10, 2013	Haleakala	Pan-STARRS 1	·	2.3 km	MPC · JPL
546795	2010 XK_{95}	—	December 3, 2015	Mount Lemmon	Mount Lemmon Survey	·	3.1 km	MPC · JPL
546796	2010 XD_{96}	—	October 2, 2013	Haleakala	Pan-STARRS 1	·	660 m	MPC · JPL
546797	2010 XE_{96}	—	December 2, 2010	Catalina	CSS	·	720 m	MPC · JPL
546798	2010 XJ_{96}	—	January 27, 2012	Mount Lemmon	Mount Lemmon Survey	·	2.2 km	MPC · JPL
546799	2010 XS_{96}	—	December 1, 2005	Mount Lemmon	Mount Lemmon Survey	·	2.3 km	MPC · JPL
546800	2010 XT_{96}	—	November 21, 2015	Mount Lemmon	Mount Lemmon Survey	EOS	1.5 km	MPC · JPL

== 546801–546900 ==
back to top

Designation			Discovery			Properties		Ref
Permanent	Provisional	Named after	Date	Site	Discoverer(s)	Category	Diam.	Ref
546801	2010 XT_{97}	—	September 23, 2015	Haleakala	Pan-STARRS 1	·	3.3 km	MPC · JPL
546802	2010 XM_{98}	—	May 30, 2013	Mount Lemmon	Mount Lemmon Survey	·	1.9 km	MPC · JPL
546803	2010 XT_{98}	—	December 3, 2010	Mount Lemmon	Mount Lemmon Survey	·	2.0 km	MPC · JPL
546804	2010 XD_{99}	—	September 23, 2015	Haleakala	Pan-STARRS 1	·	2.8 km	MPC · JPL
546805	2010 XA_{100}	—	November 5, 2010	Kitt Peak	Spacewatch	·	2.3 km	MPC · JPL
546806	2010 XV_{101}	—	February 13, 2012	Haleakala	Pan-STARRS 1	·	2.5 km	MPC · JPL
546807	2010 XW_{101}	—	October 3, 2015	Mount Lemmon	Mount Lemmon Survey	·	2.7 km	MPC · JPL
546808	2010 XA_{102}	—	April 10, 2016	Haleakala	Pan-STARRS 1	L4	7.7 km	MPC · JPL
546809	2010 XD_{102}	—	December 13, 2010	Mount Lemmon	Mount Lemmon Survey	·	3.3 km	MPC · JPL
546810	2010 XG_{102}	—	December 2, 2010	Mount Lemmon	Mount Lemmon Survey	·	2.7 km	MPC · JPL
546811	2010 XO_{102}	—	December 3, 2010	Mount Lemmon	Mount Lemmon Survey	V	500 m	MPC · JPL
546812	2010 XP_{102}	—	December 1, 2010	Mount Lemmon	Mount Lemmon Survey	·	810 m	MPC · JPL
546813	2010 XT_{102}	—	December 8, 2010	Mount Lemmon	Mount Lemmon Survey	TIR	3.2 km	MPC · JPL
546814	2010 XX_{102}	—	December 2, 2010	Mount Lemmon	Mount Lemmon Survey	·	2.5 km	MPC · JPL
546815	2010 XJ_{103}	—	December 15, 2010	Mount Lemmon	Mount Lemmon Survey	·	1.3 km	MPC · JPL
546816	2010 XR_{103}	—	October 22, 2015	Haleakala	Pan-STARRS 1	·	2.6 km	MPC · JPL
546817	2010 XJ_{105}	—	May 4, 1994	Kitt Peak	Spacewatch	V	580 m	MPC · JPL
546818	2010 XK_{105}	—	December 14, 2010	Mount Lemmon	Mount Lemmon Survey	L4	8.3 km	MPC · JPL
546819	2010 XM_{105}	—	January 2, 2017	Haleakala	Pan-STARRS 1	·	1.9 km	MPC · JPL
546820	2010 XO_{105}	—	December 5, 2010	Mount Lemmon	Mount Lemmon Survey	L4	9.3 km	MPC · JPL
546821	2010 XP_{105}	—	February 24, 2012	Mount Lemmon	Mount Lemmon Survey	EOS	1.4 km	MPC · JPL
546822	2010 XU_{105}	—	December 13, 2010	Mauna Kea	M. Micheli, L. Wells	·	2.0 km	MPC · JPL
546823	2010 XA_{106}	—	May 8, 2013	Haleakala	Pan-STARRS 1	·	2.4 km	MPC · JPL
546824	2010 XC_{106}	—	November 21, 2003	Socorro	LINEAR	·	660 m	MPC · JPL
546825	2010 XM_{106}	—	December 1, 2010	Mount Lemmon	Mount Lemmon Survey	L4	6.9 km	MPC · JPL
546826	2010 XJ_{108}	—	December 2, 2010	Mount Lemmon	Mount Lemmon Survey	L4	6.1 km	MPC · JPL
546827	2010 XB_{109}	—	December 6, 2010	Mount Lemmon	Mount Lemmon Survey	L4	7.0 km	MPC · JPL
546828	2010 XK_{109}	—	December 6, 2010	Mount Lemmon	Mount Lemmon Survey	·	2.9 km	MPC · JPL
546829	2010 XL_{109}	—	December 6, 2010	Mount Lemmon	Mount Lemmon Survey	L4	7.6 km	MPC · JPL
546830	2010 XX_{109}	—	December 14, 2010	Mount Lemmon	Mount Lemmon Survey	NYS	990 m	MPC · JPL
546831	2010 XO_{110}	—	December 13, 2010	Mount Lemmon	Mount Lemmon Survey	·	900 m	MPC · JPL
546832	2010 XA_{111}	—	December 10, 2010	Mount Lemmon	Mount Lemmon Survey	·	960 m	MPC · JPL
546833	2010 YT	—	February 10, 2008	Mount Lemmon	Mount Lemmon Survey	·	910 m	MPC · JPL
546834	2010 YF_{2}	—	January 13, 2004	Anderson Mesa	LONEOS	PHO	810 m	MPC · JPL
546835	2010 YF_{3}	—	March 4, 2000	Apache Point	SDSS	·	2.8 km	MPC · JPL
546836	2010 YV_{3}	—	December 30, 2010	Piszkés-tető	K. Sárneczky, Z. Kuli	·	3.6 km	MPC · JPL
546837	2010 YR_{4}	—	November 19, 2003	Palomar	NEAT	·	710 m	MPC · JPL
546838	2010 YO_{5}	—	November 30, 2005	Mount Lemmon	Mount Lemmon Survey	EOS	2.1 km	MPC · JPL
546839	2010 YC_{6}	—	June 2, 2014	Haleakala	Pan-STARRS 1	EOS	2.0 km	MPC · JPL
546840	2010 YR_{6}	—	December 25, 2010	Mount Lemmon	Mount Lemmon Survey	L4	8.0 km	MPC · JPL
546841	2010 YS_{6}	—	September 23, 2015	Haleakala	Pan-STARRS 1	·	2.7 km	MPC · JPL
546842 Ruanjiangao	2011 YD_{3}	Ruanjiangao	December 21, 2011	Xingming	Xu, Z., X. Gao	·	1.5 km	MPC · JPL
546843 Xuzhijian	2014 QK_{307}	Xuzhijian	December 2, 2004	Catalina	CSS	(2076)	970 m	MPC · JPL
546844 Jinzhangwei	2016 UZ_{58}	Jinzhangwei	September 11, 2016	Xingming	Ruan, J., X. Gao	·	2.2 km	MPC · JPL
546845 Wulumuqiyizhong	2016 UB_{101}	Wulumuqiyizhong	December 21, 2011	Xingming	Xu, Z., X. Gao	H	410 m	MPC · JPL
546846 Sunpeiyuan	2018 VD_{42}	Sunpeiyuan	January 9, 2011	Xingming	Xu, Z., X. Gao	ADE	1.8 km	MPC · JPL
546847	2010 AV	—	January 4, 2010	Kitt Peak	Spacewatch	EUP	2.7 km	MPC · JPL
546848	2010 AX_{3}	—	December 18, 2009	Kitt Peak	Spacewatch	EOS	1.9 km	MPC · JPL
546849	2010 AR_{4}	—	January 4, 2010	Kitt Peak	Spacewatch	H	590 m	MPC · JPL
546850	2010 AE_{5}	—	February 12, 2000	Apache Point	SDSS	EOS	1.6 km	MPC · JPL
546851	2010 AN_{6}	—	December 17, 2009	Mount Lemmon	Mount Lemmon Survey	·	2.3 km	MPC · JPL
546852	2010 AO_{7}	—	January 6, 2010	Kitt Peak	Spacewatch	H	630 m	MPC · JPL
546853	2010 AK_{8}	—	January 6, 2010	Catalina	CSS	·	3.1 km	MPC · JPL
546854	2010 AT_{8}	—	January 6, 2010	Kitt Peak	Spacewatch	EOS	2.5 km	MPC · JPL
546855	2010 AV_{9}	—	January 6, 2010	Kitt Peak	Spacewatch	·	2.3 km	MPC · JPL
546856	2010 AZ_{9}	—	January 6, 2010	Mount Lemmon	Mount Lemmon Survey	VER	3.3 km	MPC · JPL
546857	2010 AG_{10}	—	September 23, 2008	Kitt Peak	Spacewatch	·	1.7 km	MPC · JPL
546858	2010 AB_{11}	—	January 6, 2010	Mount Lemmon	Mount Lemmon Survey	·	2.1 km	MPC · JPL
546859	2010 AG_{11}	—	September 5, 2008	Kitt Peak	Spacewatch	·	2.3 km	MPC · JPL
546860	2010 AJ_{12}	—	January 6, 2010	Kitt Peak	Spacewatch	·	1.1 km	MPC · JPL
546861	2010 AR_{12}	—	January 6, 2010	Kitt Peak	Spacewatch	·	2.6 km	MPC · JPL
546862	2010 AC_{14}	—	January 7, 2010	Kitt Peak	Spacewatch	EOS	1.8 km	MPC · JPL
546863	2010 AD_{14}	—	April 30, 2006	Kitt Peak	Spacewatch	HYG	2.8 km	MPC · JPL
546864	2010 AE_{14}	—	July 31, 2008	Mount Lemmon	Mount Lemmon Survey	PHO	930 m	MPC · JPL
546865	2010 AH_{14}	—	September 8, 2008	Dauban	Kugel, C. R. F.	·	1.3 km	MPC · JPL
546866	2010 AL_{15}	—	January 16, 2005	Kitt Peak	Spacewatch	EOS	2.1 km	MPC · JPL
546867	2010 AT_{16}	—	January 7, 2010	Mount Lemmon	Mount Lemmon Survey	EOS	1.6 km	MPC · JPL
546868	2010 AC_{17}	—	January 7, 2010	Kitt Peak	Spacewatch	(1118)	3.2 km	MPC · JPL
546869	2010 AD_{19}	—	January 7, 2010	Mount Lemmon	Mount Lemmon Survey	EOS	1.7 km	MPC · JPL
546870	2010 AJ_{19}	—	January 7, 2010	Mount Lemmon	Mount Lemmon Survey	·	2.1 km	MPC · JPL
546871	2010 AN_{19}	—	January 7, 2010	Kitt Peak	Spacewatch	·	2.2 km	MPC · JPL
546872	2010 AL_{20}	—	January 7, 2010	Mount Lemmon	Mount Lemmon Survey	·	2.7 km	MPC · JPL
546873	2010 AP_{20}	—	May 9, 2006	Mount Lemmon	Mount Lemmon Survey	EOS	2.3 km	MPC · JPL
546874	2010 AV_{21}	—	January 6, 2010	Kitt Peak	Spacewatch	·	2.6 km	MPC · JPL
546875	2010 AG_{22}	—	April 8, 2003	Kitt Peak	Spacewatch	·	980 m	MPC · JPL
546876	2010 AX_{22}	—	December 25, 2005	Mount Lemmon	Mount Lemmon Survey	MAS	680 m	MPC · JPL
546877	2010 AE_{23}	—	November 17, 2009	Mount Lemmon	Mount Lemmon Survey	·	1.1 km	MPC · JPL
546878	2010 AM_{23}	—	January 6, 2010	Kitt Peak	Spacewatch	EOS	2.2 km	MPC · JPL
546879	2010 AU_{23}	—	January 6, 2010	Kitt Peak	Spacewatch	·	2.8 km	MPC · JPL
546880	2010 AF_{25}	—	January 6, 2010	Kitt Peak	Spacewatch	·	2.8 km	MPC · JPL
546881	2010 AH_{26}	—	January 6, 2010	Kitt Peak	Spacewatch	NYS	1.2 km	MPC · JPL
546882	2010 AZ_{28}	—	January 8, 2010	Mount Lemmon	Mount Lemmon Survey	·	2.4 km	MPC · JPL
546883	2010 AY_{29}	—	December 18, 2009	Mount Lemmon	Mount Lemmon Survey	·	2.7 km	MPC · JPL
546884	2010 AT_{30}	—	January 6, 2010	Kitt Peak	Spacewatch	·	2.7 km	MPC · JPL
546885	2010 AU_{30}	—	January 6, 2010	Kitt Peak	Spacewatch	·	2.8 km	MPC · JPL
546886	2010 AN_{32}	—	June 21, 2007	Mount Lemmon	Mount Lemmon Survey	·	2.9 km	MPC · JPL
546887	2010 AE_{36}	—	January 7, 2010	Kitt Peak	Spacewatch	·	3.1 km	MPC · JPL
546888	2010 AT_{36}	—	November 1, 2008	Mount Lemmon	Mount Lemmon Survey	·	3.0 km	MPC · JPL
546889	2010 AN_{37}	—	March 13, 2005	Kitt Peak	Spacewatch	·	2.3 km	MPC · JPL
546890	2010 AV_{37}	—	January 7, 2010	Kitt Peak	Spacewatch	EOS	1.7 km	MPC · JPL
546891	2010 AR_{38}	—	January 8, 2010	Kitt Peak	Spacewatch	EOS	1.6 km	MPC · JPL
546892	2010 AB_{39}	—	October 27, 2009	Mount Lemmon	Mount Lemmon Survey	AEG	2.4 km	MPC · JPL
546893	2010 AD_{39}	—	January 10, 2010	Kitt Peak	Spacewatch	·	3.0 km	MPC · JPL
546894	2010 AL_{40}	—	January 8, 2010	Mount Lemmon	Mount Lemmon Survey	TIR	2.5 km	MPC · JPL
546895	2010 AW_{40}	—	January 5, 2010	Kitt Peak	Spacewatch	·	3.6 km	MPC · JPL
546896	2010 AO_{41}	—	January 6, 2010	Kitt Peak	Spacewatch	·	2.3 km	MPC · JPL
546897	2010 AL_{42}	—	February 14, 2005	Kitt Peak	Spacewatch	·	2.0 km	MPC · JPL
546898	2010 AA_{43}	—	January 6, 2010	Mount Lemmon	Mount Lemmon Survey	·	3.0 km	MPC · JPL
546899	2010 AU_{43}	—	January 6, 2010	Catalina	CSS	T_{j} (2.94)	3.3 km	MPC · JPL
546900	2010 AN_{44}	—	December 1, 2008	Mount Lemmon	Mount Lemmon Survey	·	1.9 km	MPC · JPL

== 546901–547000 ==
back to top

Designation			Discovery			Properties		Ref
Permanent	Provisional	Named after	Date	Site	Discoverer(s)	Category	Diam.	Ref
546901	2010 AV_{44}	—	January 7, 2010	Mount Lemmon	Mount Lemmon Survey	·	2.4 km	MPC · JPL
546902	2010 AY_{44}	—	January 7, 2010	Mount Lemmon	Mount Lemmon Survey	EOS	1.7 km	MPC · JPL
546903	2010 AA_{45}	—	January 7, 2010	Mount Lemmon	Mount Lemmon Survey	·	1.9 km	MPC · JPL
546904	2010 AG_{45}	—	December 18, 2009	Mount Lemmon	Mount Lemmon Survey	·	1.8 km	MPC · JPL
546905	2010 AA_{46}	—	January 7, 2010	Mount Lemmon	Mount Lemmon Survey	·	1.1 km	MPC · JPL
546906	2010 AO_{47}	—	October 21, 2008	Kitt Peak	Spacewatch	VER	3.3 km	MPC · JPL
546907	2010 AG_{49}	—	January 8, 2010	Kitt Peak	Spacewatch	EOS	1.7 km	MPC · JPL
546908	2010 AP_{51}	—	March 10, 2003	Palomar	NEAT	·	1.3 km	MPC · JPL
546909	2010 AM_{52}	—	November 16, 2009	Mount Lemmon	Mount Lemmon Survey	·	1.3 km	MPC · JPL
546910	2010 AR_{52}	—	December 27, 2009	Kitt Peak	Spacewatch	EOS	1.9 km	MPC · JPL
546911	2010 AV_{52}	—	January 8, 2010	Mount Lemmon	Mount Lemmon Survey	EOS	1.5 km	MPC · JPL
546912	2010 AV_{53}	—	January 8, 2010	Kitt Peak	Spacewatch	THB	2.1 km	MPC · JPL
546913	2010 AL_{54}	—	January 8, 2010	Mount Lemmon	Mount Lemmon Survey	·	2.6 km	MPC · JPL
546914	2010 AO_{54}	—	August 29, 2005	Palomar	NEAT	·	970 m	MPC · JPL
546915	2010 AM_{57}	—	December 17, 2009	Kitt Peak	Spacewatch	·	2.9 km	MPC · JPL
546916	2010 AP_{57}	—	January 11, 2010	Mount Lemmon	Mount Lemmon Survey	·	2.0 km	MPC · JPL
546917	2010 AV_{57}	—	January 11, 2010	Mount Lemmon	Mount Lemmon Survey	·	2.2 km	MPC · JPL
546918	2010 AR_{60}	—	October 15, 2009	Mount Lemmon	Mount Lemmon Survey	·	3.9 km	MPC · JPL
546919	2010 AV_{62}	—	January 8, 2010	Kitt Peak	Spacewatch	·	2.9 km	MPC · JPL
546920	2010 AK_{64}	—	December 17, 2009	Mount Lemmon	Mount Lemmon Survey	·	2.0 km	MPC · JPL
546921	2010 AO_{64}	—	March 8, 2005	Kitt Peak	Spacewatch	·	3.4 km	MPC · JPL
546922	2010 AA_{69}	—	January 12, 2010	Catalina	CSS	·	2.5 km	MPC · JPL
546923	2010 AU_{70}	—	November 21, 2009	Mount Lemmon	Mount Lemmon Survey	H	430 m	MPC · JPL
546924	2010 AB_{72}	—	January 13, 2010	Kitt Peak	Spacewatch	EOS	1.8 km	MPC · JPL
546925	2010 AM_{72}	—	January 13, 2010	Mount Lemmon	Mount Lemmon Survey	·	1.1 km	MPC · JPL
546926	2010 AS_{72}	—	January 13, 2010	Mount Lemmon	Mount Lemmon Survey	·	2.2 km	MPC · JPL
546927	2010 AE_{73}	—	January 13, 2010	Mount Lemmon	Mount Lemmon Survey	PHO	920 m	MPC · JPL
546928	2010 AN_{74}	—	October 14, 2001	Apache Point	SDSS Collaboration	·	1.3 km	MPC · JPL
546929	2010 AJ_{79}	—	January 13, 2010	Mount Lemmon	Mount Lemmon Survey	PHO	2.0 km	MPC · JPL
546930	2010 AC_{141}	—	October 24, 2008	Bergisch Gladbach	W. Bickel	EOS	2.3 km	MPC · JPL
546931	2010 AN_{141}	—	December 16, 2009	Kitt Peak	Spacewatch	·	1.3 km	MPC · JPL
546932	2010 AW_{141}	—	November 12, 2005	Kitt Peak	Spacewatch	·	1.1 km	MPC · JPL
546933	2010 AC_{142}	—	January 6, 2010	Kitt Peak	Spacewatch	NYS	1.1 km	MPC · JPL
546934	2010 AV_{142}	—	January 7, 2010	Kitt Peak	Spacewatch	VER	2.2 km	MPC · JPL
546935	2010 AD_{143}	—	January 7, 2010	Kitt Peak	Spacewatch	·	2.4 km	MPC · JPL
546936	2010 AQ_{143}	—	October 26, 2008	Mount Lemmon	Mount Lemmon Survey	·	2.8 km	MPC · JPL
546937	2010 AS_{143}	—	January 8, 2010	Mount Lemmon	Mount Lemmon Survey	TIR	2.8 km	MPC · JPL
546938	2010 AV_{143}	—	September 29, 2008	Mount Lemmon	Mount Lemmon Survey	·	2.7 km	MPC · JPL
546939	2010 AB_{144}	—	January 13, 2010	Mount Lemmon	Mount Lemmon Survey	·	2.3 km	MPC · JPL
546940	2010 AN_{154}	—	January 24, 2014	Haleakala	Pan-STARRS 1	PHO	880 m	MPC · JPL
546941	2010 AV_{154}	—	December 16, 2014	Haleakala	Pan-STARRS 1	·	2.3 km	MPC · JPL
546942	2010 AX_{154}	—	December 13, 2014	Haleakala	Pan-STARRS 1	·	3.1 km	MPC · JPL
546943	2010 AF_{155}	—	June 16, 2012	Haleakala	Pan-STARRS 1	·	1.1 km	MPC · JPL
546944	2010 AT_{155}	—	September 14, 2017	Haleakala	Pan-STARRS 1	H	440 m	MPC · JPL
546945	2010 AK_{156}	—	December 25, 2009	Kitt Peak	Spacewatch	·	2.5 km	MPC · JPL
546946	2010 AL_{156}	—	January 11, 2010	Kitt Peak	Spacewatch	HYG	2.2 km	MPC · JPL
546947	2010 AC_{157}	—	December 2, 2014	Haleakala	Pan-STARRS 1	·	2.3 km	MPC · JPL
546948	2010 AD_{157}	—	August 28, 2013	Catalina	CSS	·	3.1 km	MPC · JPL
546949	2010 AE_{157}	—	September 22, 2003	Palomar	NEAT	·	2.0 km	MPC · JPL
546950	2010 AG_{157}	—	February 4, 2016	Haleakala	Pan-STARRS 1	·	2.6 km	MPC · JPL
546951	2010 AK_{157}	—	September 3, 2008	Kitt Peak	Spacewatch	·	2.3 km	MPC · JPL
546952	2010 AL_{157}	—	March 30, 2016	Haleakala	Pan-STARRS 1	EOS	1.5 km	MPC · JPL
546953	2010 AM_{157}	—	January 17, 2016	Haleakala	Pan-STARRS 1	·	2.4 km	MPC · JPL
546954	2010 AA_{158}	—	December 1, 2014	Haleakala	Pan-STARRS 1	·	2.0 km	MPC · JPL
546955	2010 AM_{158}	—	November 21, 2009	Mount Lemmon	Mount Lemmon Survey	·	2.2 km	MPC · JPL
546956	2010 AR_{158}	—	December 25, 2009	Kitt Peak	Spacewatch	·	1.2 km	MPC · JPL
546957	2010 AL_{159}	—	December 1, 2014	Haleakala	Pan-STARRS 1	·	2.2 km	MPC · JPL
546958	2010 AM_{159}	—	September 3, 2013	Haleakala	Pan-STARRS 1	EOS	1.3 km	MPC · JPL
546959	2010 AP_{159}	—	August 26, 2012	Haleakala	Pan-STARRS 1	·	900 m	MPC · JPL
546960	2010 AB_{160}	—	January 11, 2010	Kitt Peak	Spacewatch	·	2.8 km	MPC · JPL
546961	2010 AC_{160}	—	November 26, 2014	Haleakala	Pan-STARRS 1	·	2.6 km	MPC · JPL
546962	2010 AH_{160}	—	December 10, 2014	Mount Lemmon	Mount Lemmon Survey	·	2.0 km	MPC · JPL
546963	2010 AN_{161}	—	January 11, 2010	Kitt Peak	Spacewatch	·	2.8 km	MPC · JPL
546964	2010 AP_{161}	—	January 11, 2010	Kitt Peak	Spacewatch	·	960 m	MPC · JPL
546965	2010 BH	—	November 20, 2003	Kitt Peak	Spacewatch	·	2.6 km	MPC · JPL
546966	2010 BB_{1}	—	September 5, 2008	Kitt Peak	Spacewatch	TIR	2.9 km	MPC · JPL
546967	2010 BH_{1}	—	December 20, 2009	Kitt Peak	Spacewatch	·	1.0 km	MPC · JPL
546968	2010 BR_{1}	—	January 18, 2010	Dauban	C. Rinner, Kugel, F.	·	1.9 km	MPC · JPL
546969	2010 BX_{1}	—	September 12, 2002	Palomar	NEAT	·	2.9 km	MPC · JPL
546970	2010 BE_{2}	—	January 18, 2010	Dauban	C. Rinner, Kugel, F.	NYS	960 m	MPC · JPL
546971	2010 BF_{3}	—	December 18, 2009	Mount Lemmon	Mount Lemmon Survey	TIR	2.4 km	MPC · JPL
546972	2010 BR_{4}	—	January 5, 2010	Kitt Peak	Spacewatch	·	3.1 km	MPC · JPL
546973	2010 BB_{5}	—	December 15, 2009	Mount Lemmon	Mount Lemmon Survey	·	2.8 km	MPC · JPL
546974	2010 BP_{153}	—	January 23, 2010	Haleakala	Pan-STARRS 1	SDO	212 km	MPC · JPL
546975	2010 CP	—	December 18, 2009	Mount Lemmon	Mount Lemmon Survey	T_{j} (2.99) · EUP	3.7 km	MPC · JPL
546976	2010 CF_{12}	—	February 12, 2010	Pla D'Arguines	R. Ferrando, Ferrando, M.	H	530 m	MPC · JPL
546977	2010 CC_{20}	—	February 8, 2010	Kitt Peak	Spacewatch	EOS	2.2 km	MPC · JPL
546978	2010 CJ_{21}	—	December 25, 2009	Kitt Peak	Spacewatch	EOS	1.6 km	MPC · JPL
546979	2010 CK_{21}	—	January 6, 2010	Kitt Peak	Spacewatch	·	2.5 km	MPC · JPL
546980	2010 CP_{21}	—	September 11, 2001	Anderson Mesa	LONEOS	·	1.0 km	MPC · JPL
546981	2010 CQ_{21}	—	January 6, 2010	Kitt Peak	Spacewatch	·	2.8 km	MPC · JPL
546982	2010 CC_{22}	—	February 9, 2010	Kitt Peak	Spacewatch	·	2.9 km	MPC · JPL
546983	2010 CA_{23}	—	January 10, 2010	Kitt Peak	Spacewatch	·	2.5 km	MPC · JPL
546984	2010 CC_{23}	—	October 31, 2008	Mount Lemmon	Mount Lemmon Survey	EOS	1.8 km	MPC · JPL
546985	2010 CA_{24}	—	July 30, 2000	Cerro Tololo	Deep Ecliptic Survey	·	1.2 km	MPC · JPL
546986	2010 CJ_{24}	—	August 5, 2007	7300	W. K. Y. Yeung	EOS	1.9 km	MPC · JPL
546987	2010 CZ_{24}	—	February 9, 2010	Mount Lemmon	Mount Lemmon Survey	THM	1.8 km	MPC · JPL
546988	2010 CF_{25}	—	February 9, 2010	Mount Lemmon	Mount Lemmon Survey	·	990 m	MPC · JPL
546989	2010 CK_{25}	—	April 8, 2003	Kitt Peak	Spacewatch	MAS	680 m	MPC · JPL
546990	2010 CV_{25}	—	March 9, 2005	Mount Lemmon	Mount Lemmon Survey	THM	1.8 km	MPC · JPL
546991	2010 CZ_{25}	—	February 9, 2010	Mount Lemmon	Mount Lemmon Survey	·	2.2 km	MPC · JPL
546992	2010 CB_{27}	—	January 7, 2010	Kitt Peak	Spacewatch	·	2.4 km	MPC · JPL
546993	2010 CA_{30}	—	February 9, 2010	Mount Lemmon	Mount Lemmon Survey	VER	2.5 km	MPC · JPL
546994	2010 CQ_{30}	—	February 9, 2010	Mount Lemmon	Mount Lemmon Survey	·	1.0 km	MPC · JPL
546995	2010 CH_{31}	—	March 10, 2005	Mount Lemmon	Mount Lemmon Survey	THM	2.0 km	MPC · JPL
546996	2010 CL_{31}	—	November 18, 2008	Kitt Peak	Spacewatch	THM	2.8 km	MPC · JPL
546997	2010 CT_{32}	—	February 10, 2010	Kitt Peak	Spacewatch	EOS	1.8 km	MPC · JPL
546998	2010 CS_{33}	—	April 6, 2005	Mount Lemmon	Mount Lemmon Survey	·	2.2 km	MPC · JPL
546999	2010 CT_{33}	—	August 28, 2002	Palomar	NEAT	·	2.4 km	MPC · JPL
547000	2010 CN_{34}	—	February 10, 2010	Kitt Peak	Spacewatch	·	1.1 km	MPC · JPL

back to top

== Meaning of names ==
As minor planet discoveries are confirmed, they are given a permanent number by the IAU's Minor Planet Center (MPC), and the discoverers can then submit names for them, following the IAU's naming conventions. The list below concerns those minor planets in the specified number-range that have received names, and explains the meanings of those names.

Official naming citations of newly named small Solar System bodies are approved and published in a bulletin by IAU's Working Group for Small Bodies Nomenclature (WGSBN). Before May 2021, citations were published in MPC's Minor Planet Circulars for many decades. Recent citations can also be found on the JPL Small-Body Database (SBDB). Until his death in 2016, German astronomer Lutz D. Schmadel compiled these citations into the Dictionary of Minor Planet Names (DMP) and regularly updated the collection.

Based on Paul Herget's The Names of the Minor Planets, Schmadel also researched the unclear origin of numerous asteroids, most of which had been named prior to World War II. This article incorporates text from this source, which is in the public domain: SBDB New namings may only be added to this list below after official publication as the preannouncement of names is condemned. The WGSBN publishes a comprehensive guideline for the naming rules of non-cometary small Solar System bodies.

Named minor planet	Provisional	This minor planet was named for...	Ref · Catalog
546025 Ábrahámpéter	2011 WG_{117}	Péter Ábrahám (born 1964) is a Hungarian astrophysicist and a former director of the Konkoly Observatory (2010 to 2015), whose research includes the nebular hypothesis and the formation of stars.	IAU · 546025
546049 Zhujin	2011 YL_{4}	Zhu Jin (born 1965), a Chinese astronomer and editor of the monthly publishing magazine Amateur Astronomer in China. He leads the "Popularization Working Committee of the Chinese Astronomical Society", and was the director of the Beijing Schmidt CCD Asteroid Program (1995–2002) and the Beijing Planetarium (2002–2019), respectively.	IAU · 546049
546098 Kosaka	2010 TF_{65}	Kozo Kosaka, Japanese amateur astronomer who discovered comet C/1969 T1 (Tago–Sato–Kosaka) with a 15-cm reflector, when he was only 17 years old.	IAU · 546098
546186 Vasylivchenko	2010 TA_{176}	Vasyl Mykolayovych Ivchenko (born 1948), Ukrainian astronomer whose interests include space plasma, radio astronomy, the solar corona and the earth's magnetosphere.	IAU · 546186
546235 Kolbenheyer	2010 UK_{29}	Tibor Kolbenheyer (1917–1993), a Slovakian-Hungarian geophysicist and astrophysicist.	IAU · 546235
546275 Kozák	2010 UW_{83}	Danuta Kozák (born 1987), a Hungarian sprint canoeist, who won six Olympic gold medals during 2008–2021.	IAU · 546275
546286 Fuchsjenő	2010 UF_{101}	Jenő Fuchs, four-time Hungarian Olympic champion saber fencer.	IAU · 546286
546396 Szilágyiáron	2010 VN_{95}	Áron Szilágyi, Hungarian Olympic, European and world champion saber fencer.	IAU · 546396
546471 Szipál	2010 VQ_{176}	Szipál Márton (1924–2016) was a Hungarian-American photographer, most known for his portrait photographs of movie stars and celebrities. In his later years he worked for Hungarian newspapers and taught at several photography schools.	IAU · 546471
546498 Demjénferenc	2010 VQ_{206}	Ferenc Demjén (b. 1946), a Hungarian rock singer, songwriter and bass guitarist.	IAU · 546498
546515 Almásy	2010 VY_{216}	Paul Almásy (1906–2003) was a Hungarian-born French photographer and a pioneer of photojournalism. For more than six decades he traveled the world and took about 120,000 photographs, creating a detailed picture archive that is a unique document of 20th century history.	IAU · 546515
546756 Sunguoyou	2010 XL_{71}	Sun Guoyou (born 1984) is a Chinese amateur astronomer and a discoverer of minor planets with the Sky Survey team at Xingming Observatory (C42). He also discovered supernovae, novae, dwarf novae, variable stars, double stars and planetary nebulae as well as comet C/2015 F5 (SWAN-XingMing) in 2015.	IAU · 546756
546842 Ruanjiangao	2011 YD_{3}	Jiangao Ruan, or Ruan Jiangao (born 1986), a Chinese amateur astronomer and a discoverer of minor planets from Fangchenggang. Sometimes credited as "J. Ruan", he also discovered supernovae, novae in M31 and M33, C/2009 G1 (STEREO), and more than 80 other SOHO comets.	IAU · 546842
546843 Xuzhijian	2014 QK_{307}	Xu Zhijian (born 1989), a Chinese amateur astronomer and a discoverer of minor planets from Nanjing. He also discovered supernovae, novae in M31 and M81, and more than 300 SOHO comets. He has also co-founded the Nanjing Amateur Astronomers Association.	IAU · 546843
546844 Jinzhangwei	2016 UZ_{58}	Jin Zhangwei (born 1968), a Chinese amateur astronomer and a discoverer of minor planets from Ningbo, who is a member of the Sky Survey team at Xingming Observatory (C42). He also discovered supernovae and several SOHO comets.	IAU · 546844
546845 Wulumuqiyizhong	2016 UB_{101}	The No.1 Senior High School of Ürümqi (Wulumuqiyizhong) located in the Xinjiang Uyghur Autonomous Region of China. In 2021, this asteroid was named on the occasion of the 130th anniversary of the school's founding. Several minor planets, including this one, have been discovered at the Xingming Observatory (C42) with telescopes from this school.	IAU · 546845
546846 Sunpeiyuan	2018 VD_{42}	Sun Peiyuan (born 1994) is a Chinese amateur astronomer and a member of Xingming Observatory. He has discovered several novae, supernovae, asteroids and SOHO comets, and is engaged in the popularization of astronomy.	IAU · 546846
