= List of parabolic and hyperbolic comets =

Comets that may not be orbiting the Sun

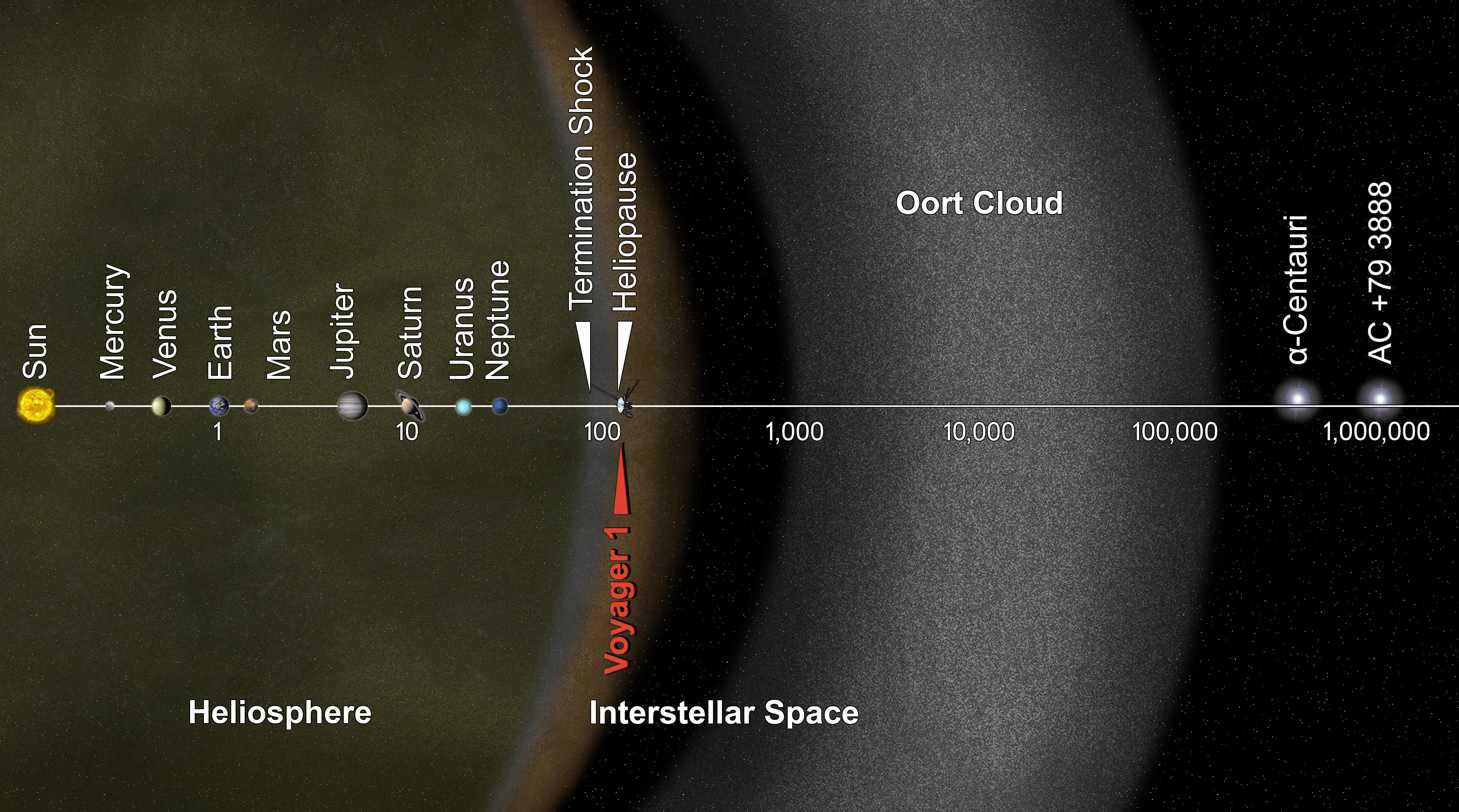
- Top: Schematic of the hypothetical Oort cloud, with a spherical outer cloud and a disc-shaped inner cloud
- Bottom: From the Sun to the nearest star: Overview of the different regions on a logarithmic scale in astronomical units (AU)

This is a list of parabolic and hyperbolic comets in the Solar System. Many of these comets may come from the Oort cloud, or perhaps even have interstellar origin. The Oort Cloud is not gravitationally attracted enough to the Sun to form into a fairly thin disk, like the inner Solar System. Thus, comets originating from the Oort Cloud can come from roughly any orientation (inclination to the ecliptic), and many even have a retrograde orbit. By definition, a hyperbolic orbit means that the comet will only travel through the Solar System once, with the Sun acting as a gravitational slingshot, sending the comet hurtling out of the Solar System entirely unless its eccentricity is otherwise changed. Comets orbiting in this way still originate from the Solar System, however. Typically comets in the Oort Cloud are thought to have roughly circular orbits around the Sun, but their orbital velocity is so slow that they may easily be perturbed by passing stars and the galactic tide. Astronomers have been discovering weakly hyperbolic comets that were perturbed out of the Oort Cloud since the mid-1800s.

Prior to finding a well-determined orbit for comets, the JPL Small-Body Database and the Minor Planet Center list comet orbits as having an assumed eccentricity of 1.0. (This is the eccentricity of a parabolic trajectory; hyperbolics will be those with eccentricity greater than 1.0.) In the list below, a number of comets discovered by the SOHO space telescope have assumed eccentricities of exactly 1.0, because most orbits are based on only an insufficient observation arc of several hours or minutes. The SOHO satellite observes the corona of the Sun and the area around it, and as a result often observes sungrazing comets, including the Kreutz sungrazers.

The Kreutz sungrazers originate from the progenitor of the Great Comet of 1106. Although officially given an assumed eccentricity of 1.0, they have an orbital period of roughly 750 years (which would give an actual eccentricity of ~0.99988), and an inclination of 144 degrees. Many of the Kreutz sungrazers do not survive perihelion, as they are quite literally "sungrazers" – their average perihelion distance is 0.0050 AU, and the radius of the Sun is 0.0046 AU; i.e. they pass 50,000 km above the surface of the Sun. See the list of Kreutz sungrazers article for a more complete list of parabolic comets belonging to this group.

Three other sungrazing groups, the Meyer, Marsden, and Kracht groups, have respectively a perihelion distance of 0.035, 0.044, and 0.049 AU, an inclination of 72, 13, and 26 degrees, and a period of at least a decade, 5.6, and 3–4 years.

Some comets in this list are designated with an X-designation. This is used for comets whose orbits have not been calculated for various reasons: often they were observed so long ago that nobody recorded their location accurately enough for an orbit to be determined, or they were observed in modern times over such a short period that their long-term orbit was too uncertain to calculate.

Interstellar objects generally have strongly hyperbolic orbits, for example the first known object of this class 1I/2017 U1 ʻOumuamua has an eccentricity of 1.192. Solar System comets may also become interstellar after close planetary flybys like in the cases of C/1980 E1 (Bowell) and C/2024 L5 (ATLAS).

== Ancient and Medieval Times ==
=== Before 1 AD ===
Comet designation	Name/ discoverer(s)	e	q (AU)	i (°)	Abs. mag (M1)	Nucleus radii	Perihelion date	Ref
X/-2287 (Note: Described by Ancient Egyptians as a "hairy star accompanying Pepi I Meryre to the heavens" – possibly an earlier apparition of Comet Hale–Bopp)		1.0					~-2288	—
X/-611 N1		1.0					-611/07/15	
X/-531 V1		1.0					-531/11/01	—
X/-516 N1		1.0					-516/07/15	—
X/-502 X1		1.0					-502/12/15	—
X/-467 (Note: Possibly an earlier apparition of 1P/Halley.)		1.0					-467	
X/-433		1.0					-433	—
X/-371 (Note: Likely the progenitor of all the Kreutz sungrazer comets)	Aristotle/Ephorus (see Kreutz sungrazer)	1.0	0.007	139		60 km	-371/01/20	
X/-341	Aristotle	1.0					-341	
X/-325 (Note: May have been a sighting of Messier 41)	Aristotle	1.0					-325	
X/-305		1.0					-305	—
X/-303		1.0					-303	—
X/-296		1.0					-296	—
X/-240 J1		1.0					-240/05/16	—
X/-238 G1		1.0					-238/07/10	—
X/-234 A1		1.0					-234/01/15	—
X/-233 1		1.0					-233	—
X/-233 B1		1.0					-233	
X/-233 3		1.0					-233	—
X/-233 4		1.0					-233	—
X/-214		1.0					-214	—
X/-204 P1		1.0					-204/08/15	—
X/-172		1.0					-172	—
X/-157 T1		1.0					-157/10/16	—
X/-156 U1		1.0					-156	
X/-155 N1		1.0					-155/07/15	—
X/-154 A1		1.0					-154/01/15	—
X/-154 C1		1.0					-154/02/15	—
X/-148 J1		1.0					-148/05/15	—
X/-147 E1		1.0					-147/03/14	—
X/-147 P1		1.0					-147/08/06	—
X/-147 T1		1.0					-147/10/15	—
C/-146 P1		1.0	0.43	71			-146/06/28	JPL
X/-138 E1		1.0					-138/03/15	—
X/-138 J1		1.0					-138/05/15	—
X/-138 P1		1.0					-138/08/15	—
X/-137 K1		1.0					-137	
X/-137 T1		1.0					-137/10/15	—
X/-135 N1		1.0					-135/07/15	—
X/-135 R1		1.0					-135/09/15	—
X/-134 N1		1.0					-134/06/15	
X/-120		1.0					-120	—
X/-119 K1		1.0					-119/05/15	
X/-110 L1		1.0					-119/06/15	—
X/-109/-108		1.0					-109/-108	—
X/-84 E1		1.0					-84/03/15	—
X/-77 R1		1.0					-77/09/15	—
X/-76 J1		1.0					-76/05/15	—
X/-73 J1		1.0					-73/05/10	—
X/-72 Q1		1.0					-72/08/20	—
X/-70 P1		1.0					-70/08/04	—
X/-69 C1		1.0					-69/02/15	—
X/-61 N1		1.0					-61/07/15	—
X/-49 G1		1.0					-49/04/15	—
X/-48 G1		1.0					-49/04/15	—
X/-47 L1		1.0					-47/06/15	—
X/-44		1.0					-44	—
C/-43 K1	Caesar's Comet	1.0	0.22	110			-43/05/25	JPL
X/-32 C1		1.0					-32/02/15	—
X/-5 E1	Star of Bethlehem(?)	1.0					-5/03/05	
X/-4 G1		1.0					-4/04/15	—

=== 1 to 499 ===
Comet designation	Name/ discoverer(s)	e	q (AU)	i (°)	Abs. mag (M1)	Nucleus radii	Perihelion date	Ref
X/13 X1		1.0					13/12/15	—
X/22 V1		1.0					22/11/05	—
X/39 E1		1.0					39/03/13	—
X/54 L1		1.0					54	
X/55 L1		1.0					55/06/04	—
X/57		1.0					57	—
X/60 P1		1.0					60/08/09	
X/61 S1		1.0					61/09/27	—
X/65 L1		1.0					65/06/04	—
X/68		1.0					68	—
X/71 E1		1.0					71/03/06	—
X/72		1.0					72	—
X/75 N1		1.0					75/07/14	—
X/76 P1		1.0					76/08/09	—
X/77 B1		1.0					77/01/23	—
X/79 F1		1.0					79	
X/81		1.0					81	—
X/84 K1		1.0					84/05/25	—
X/102 A1		1.0					102/01/27	—
X/110 A1 (Note: Likely a member of the Kreutz sungrazer comets)		1.0					110/01/15	—
X/131		1.0					131	—
X/149 U1		1.0					149/10/19	—
X/160		1.0					160	—
X/161 L1		1.0					161/06/14	—
X/165		1.0					165	—
X/178 R1		1.0					178/09/15	—
X/180		1.0					180	—
X/182 P1		1.0					182/08/15	—
X/185 X1		1.0					185/12/07	—
X/188 E1		1.0					188/03/15	—
X/192 T1		1.0					192/10/15	—
X/193 V1 (Note: Possibly an earlier apparition of C/1917 F1 (Mellish).)		1.0					193/11/15	—
X/195		1.0					195	—
X/200 V1		1.0					200/11/07	—
X/204 X1		1.0					204/12/15	—
X/206 C1		1.0					206/02/15	—
X/207 V1		1.0					207/11/10	—
X/213 A1		1.0					213/01/15	—
X/222 V1		1.0					222/11/04	—
X/225 X1		1.0					225/12/09	—
X/232 X1		1.0					232/12/04	—
X/236 V1		1.0					236/11/15	—
X/236 W1		1.0					236/11/30	—
X/238 R1		1.0					238/09/15	—
X/238 W1		1.0					238/11/29	—
X/240 V1		1.0					240/11/05	—
C/240 V1		1.0	0.37	44			240/11/10	JPL
X/245 S1		1.0					245/09/18	—
X/247 B1		1.0					247/01/16	—
X/248 G1		1.0					248/04/15	—
X/251 Y1		1.0					251/12/21	—
X/252 F1		1.0					252/03/25	—
X/253 X1		1.0					253/12/15	—
X/255 C1		1.0					255/02/15	—
X/257 X1		1.0					257/12/15	—
X/259 W1		1.0					259/11/23	—
X/262 X1		1.0					262/12/02	—
X/265 L1		1.0					265/06/15	—
X/268 D1		1.0					268/02/18	—
X/275 A1		1.0					275/01/15	—
X/276 M1		1.0					276/06/24	—
X/277 C1		1.0					277/02/15	—
X/279 G1		1.0					279/04/15	—
X/281 R1		1.0					281/09/15	—
X/281 X1		1.0					281/12/15	—
X/283 H1		1.0					283/04/22	—
X/287 R1		1.0					287/09/15	—
X/290 J1		1.0					290/05/15	—
X/296 J1		1.0					296/05/15	—
X/300 G1		1.0					300/04/15	—
X/301 A1		1.0					301/01/15	—
X/301 J1		1.0					301/05/15	—
X/302 J1		1.0					302/05/15	—
X/303 G1		1.0					303/04/15	—
X/304 J1		1.0					304/05/15	—
X/305 R1		1.0					305/09/15	—
X/305 W1		1.0					305/11/21	—
X/329 P1		1.0					329/08/15	—
X/336 D1		1.0					336/02/16	—
X/340 E1		1.0					340/03/05	—
X/343 X1		1.0					343/12/08	—
X/349 W1		1.0					349/11/23	—
X/358 N1		1.0					358/07/01	—
X/363 P1 (Note: Possibly an earlier apparition of C/1969 Y1 (Bennett).)		1.0					363/08/15	—
X/363		1.0	0.008			12.5 km	363/11/15	—
X/369 E1		1.0					369/03/15	—
X/373 E1		1.0					373/03/09	—
X/377		1.0					377	—
X/386 G1		1.0					386/04/15	—
C/390 Q1		1.0	0.92	36			390/09/05	JPL
X/393 E1		1.0					393/03/15	—
C/400 F1		1.0	0.21	32			400/02/25	JPL
X/401 A1		1.0					401/01/02	—
X/402 V1		1.0					402/11/12	—
X/408		1.0					408	—
X/410		1.0					410	—
X/412 N1		1.0					412	—
X/413		1.0					413	—
X/415 M1		1.0					415/06/24	—
X/416 B1		1.0					416/01/26	—
X/416 M1		1.0					416/06/27	—
C/418 M1		1.0	0.35	110			418/10/05	JPL ·
X/419 C1		1.0					419/02/07	—
X/422 F1		1.0					422/03/21	—
X/422 M1		1.0					422	
X/422 Y1		1.0					422/12/17	—
X/423 C1 (Note: Possibly a Kreutz sungrazer or an earlier apparition of C/1931 P1 (Ryves).)		1.0					423/02/13	—
X/423 U1		1.0					423/10/15	—
X/434		1.0					434	—
C/442 V1		1.0	1.53	106			442/12/15	JPL
X/448		1.0					448	—
X/449 V1		1.0					449/11/11	—
X/450		1.0					450	—
X/467 C1		1.0					467/02/15	—

=== 500 to 999 ===
Comet designation	Name/ discoverer(s)	e	q (AU)	i (°)	Abs. mag (M1)	Nucleus radii	Perihelion date	Ref
X/501 C1		1.0					501/02/13	—
X/501 G1		1.0					501/04/14	—
X/532 A1		1.0					532/01/06	—
X/535 X1		1.0					535	—
C/539 W1 (Note: Possibly an earlier apparition of C/1245 D1.)		1.0	0.16	19			539/11/06	JPL
X/560 T1		1.0					560/10/04	—
X/561 S1		1.0					561/09/26	—
X/565 H1		1.0					565/04/21	—
C/565 O1 (Note: Possibly an earlier apparition of C/1014 C1.)		1.0	0.83	121			565/07/15	JPL
X/565 O2		1.0					565/07/22	—
C/568 O1		1.0	0.87	4			565/08/27	JPL
C/574 G1		1.0	0.73	54			574/03/25	JPL
X/574 K1		1.0					574/05/31	—
X/575 H1		1.0					575/04/27	—
X/588 W1		1.0					588/11/22	—
X/594 V1		1.0					594/11/10	—
X/595 X1		1.0					595	
X/601		1.0					601	—
X/607 G1		1.0					607/04/04	—
X/607 U1		1.0					607	
X/615 N1		1.0					615/07/15	—
X/616 N1		1.0					616/07/15	—
X/616 T1		1.0					616/10/15	—
X/626 F1		1.0					626/03/26	
X/634 S1		1.0					634/09/22	—
X/639 G1		1.0					639/04/15	—
X/641 P1		1.0					641/08/01	—
X/663 S1		1.0					663/09/29	—
X/667 K1		1.0					667/05/24	—
X/676 A1		1.0					676/01/03	—
X/676 N1		1.0					676/07/07	—
X/676 P1		1.0					676/10	
X/676 R1		1.0					676	
X/681 U1		1.0					681/10/17	—
X/683 H1		1.0					683/04/20	—
X/684 Y1		1.0					684/12	
X/707 W1		1.0					707/11/16	—
X/708 F1		1.0					708/03/30	—
X/708 S1		1.0					708/09/21	—
X/729		1.0					729	—
X/729		1.0					729	—
X/730 M1		1.0					730/06/30	—
X/739 G1		1.0					730/04/15	—
X/760 K2		1.0					760/05/20	—
X/767 A1		1.0					767/01/12	—
C/770 K1		1.0	0.58	117			770/06/05	JPL
X/773 B1		1.0					773/01/17	—
X/815 G1		1.0					815/04/15	—
C/817 C1		1.0	1.1	120			817/03/03	JPL ·
X/821 D1		1.0					821/02/27	—
X/821 E1		1.0					821/03/07	—
X/828 N1		1.0					828/07/05	—
X/829 X1		1.0					829/12/15	—
X/834 T1		1.0					834/10/09	—
X/837 H1		1.0					837/04/29	—
X/837 J1		1.0					837/05/03	—
X/837 K1		1.0					837/05/21	—
X/837 M1		1.0					837/06/17	—
X/837 M2		1.0					837/06/26	—
X/837 R1		1.0					837/09/09	—
X/838 B1		1.0					838	—
X/838 V1		1.0					838/11/11	
X/838 W1		1.0					838/11/21	—
X/839 B1		1.0					839/02/07	
X/839 E1		1.0					839/03/12	—
X/840 F1		1.0					840/03/20	—
X/840 X1		1.0					840/12/03	—
X/841 N1		1.0					841/07/15	—
X/841 Y1	Nithard	1.0					841/12/22	
X/844		1.0					844	—
X/851 G1		1.0					851/04/15	—
X/856 S1		1.0					856/09/27	—
X/864 H1		1.0					864	
X/864 M1		1.0					864/06/21	—
C/868 B1		1.0	0.42	65			868/03/04	JPL
X/869 R1		1.0					869/09/15	—
X/874		1.0					874	—
X/875 L1		1.0					875	
X/877 L1		1.0					877/06/15	—
X/882 C1		1.0					882	—
X/885		1.0					885	—
X/886 L1		1.0					886/06/13	—
X/891 J1		1.0					891/05/12	
X/892 X1		1.0					892/12/15	—
X/893 J1		1.0					893/05/06	—
X/894 C1		1.0					894/02/15	—
C/905 K1		1.0	0.2	140			905/04/26	JPL
X/906		1.0					906	—
X/923		1.0					923	—
X/928 T1		1.0					928/10/14	—
X/930		1.0					930	—
X/936 U1		1.0					936/10/28	—
X/941 P1		1.0					941/08/07	—
X/941 R1		1.0					941	
X/941 S1		1.0					941/09/18	—
X/941 V1		1.0					941	—
X/942		1.0					942	—
X/943 V1		1.0					943/11/05	—
X/956 E1		1.0					956/03/13	—
C/962 B1		1.0	0.63	119			961/12/28	JPL
X/975 G1		1.0					975/04/15	—
X/975 P1		1.0					975/08/03	
X/976		1.0					976	—
X/979		1.0					979	—
X/998 D1		1.0					998/02/23	

=== 1000s ===
Comet designation	Name/ discoverer(s)	e	q (AU)	i (°)	Abs. mag (M1)	Nucleus radii	Perihelion date	Ref
X/1003 Y1		1.0					1003/12/23	—
X/1014 B1		1.0					1014/02/10	—
C/1014 C1		1.0	0.56	117			1014/04/06	MPC · JPL
C/1018 P1		1.0	0.62	35			1018/08/27	MPC · JPL
X/1035 S1		1.0					1035/09/15	—
X/1036 B1		1.0					1036/01/15	—
X/1049 E1		1.0					1049/03/10	—
X/1056 P1		1.0					1056/08/15	—
X/1066 H1		1.0					1066/04/24	—
X/1080 A1		1.0					1080/01/06	—
C/1080 P1		1.0	0.681	6.9			1080/09/10	MPC · JPL
C/1092 A1	Great Comet of 1092	1.0	0.77	124			1092/02/22	MPC · JPL
X/1095 W1		1.0					1095/11/17	—
C/1097 T1		1.0	0.3	41			1097/09/22	MPC · JPL
X/1097 X1		1.0					1097/12/06	—

=== 1100s ===
Comet designation	Name/ discoverer(s)	e	q (AU)	i (°)	Abs. mag (M1)	Nucleus radii	Perihelion date	Ref
X/1106 C1	Great Comet of 1106	1.0	0.05	144			1106/02/10?	—
C/1110 K1		1.0	0.83	137			1110/05/18	MPC · JPL
X/1126 K1		1.0					1126/05/20	—
X/1126 X1		1.0					1126/12/15	—
X/1131 R1		1.0					1131/09/15	—
X/1132 A1		1.0					1132/01/05	—
C/1132 T1		1.0	0.736	106.3			1132/08/30	MPC · JPL
X/1133 S1		1.0					1133/09/29	—
X/1145 L1		1.0					1145/06/04	—
C/1147 A1		1.0	0.12	110			1147/01/28	MPC · JPL
X/1147 C1		1.0					1147/02/12	—
X/1151 Q1		1.0					1151/08/21	—

=== 1200s ===
Comet designation	Name/ discoverer(s)	e	q (AU)	i (°)	Abs. mag (M1)	Nucleus radii	Perihelion date	Ref
X/1226 R1		1.0					1226/09/13	—
C/1230 X1		1.0	0.86	16			1230/12/28	MPC · JPL
X/1232 U1		1.0					1232/10/18	—
X/1237 S1		1.0					1237/09/21	—
C/1240 B1		1.0	0.668	75.3			1240/01/21	MPC · JPL
X/1240 D1		1.0					1240/02/23	—
C/1245 D1		1.0	0.5	20			1245/04/01	MPC · JPL
C/1264 N1	Great Comet of 1264	1.0	0.8249	16.4			1264/07/20	MPC · JPL
X/1277 E1		1.0					1277/03/09	—
C/1293 V1 (Note: Possibly an earlier apparition of 153P/Ikeya–Zhang)		1.0	0.78	30			1293/10/28	MPC · JPL
C/1299 B1		1.0	0.3179	111			1299/03/31	MPC · JPL
X/1299 M1		1.0					1299/06/24	—

=== 1300s ===
Comet designation	Name/ discoverer(s)	e	q (AU)	i (°)	Abs. mag (M1)	Nucleus radii	Perihelion date	Ref
C/1304 C1		1.0	0.84	65			1304/02/05	MPC · JPL
C/1304 Y1		1.0	0.65	99			1305/01/19	MPC · JPL
X/1313 G1		1.0					1313/04/13	—
C/1315 U1		1.0	1.65	125.3			1315/10/05	MPC · JPL
X/1337 J1		1.0					1337/05/04	—
C/1337 M1		1.0	0.749	143.6			1337/06/14	MPC · JPL
C/1340 F1		1.0	1.1362	176.48			1340/05/13	MPC · JPL
C/1345 O1		1.0	0.89	23			1345/08/23	MPC · JPL
C/1351 W1		1.0	1.01	7			1351/11/19	MPC · JPL
X/1356 S1		1.0					1356/09/21	—
X/1360 E1		1.0					1360/03/12	—
C/1362 E1		1.0	0.3	155			1362/02/25	MPC · JPL
X/1362 M1		1.0					1362/06/29	—
X/1363 F1		1.0					1363/03/16	—
X/1368 C1		1.0					1368/02/07	—
C/1368 E1		1.0	0.48	131			1368/05/05	MPC · JPL
X/1373 J1		1.0					1373/05/15	—
C/1376 M1		1.0	0.55	76			1376/07/31	MPC · JPL
X/1388 F1		1.0					1388/03/29	—
X/1391 K1		1.0					1391/05/23	—

=== 1400s ===
Comet designation	Name/ discoverer(s)	e	q (AU)	i (°)	Abs. mag (M1)	Nucleus radii	Perihelion date	Ref
C/1402 D1 (Note: Possibly an earlier apparition of the Great Comet of 1744)	Great Comet of 1402	1.0	0.38	55			1402/03/21	MPC · JPL
X/1407 X1		1.0					1407/12/14	—
X/1430 R1		1.0					1430/09/09	—
X/1430 V1		1.0					1430/11/14	—
X/1431 A1		1.0					1431/01/03	—
X/1431 K1		1.0					1431/05/15	—
X/1432 C1		1.0					1432/02/03	—
X/1432 U1		1.0					1432/10/26	—
C/1433 R1	Comet of 1433	1.0	0.49277	103.979			1433/11/08	MPC · JPL
X/1439 F1		1.0					1439/03/25	—
C/1439 F1		1.0	0.12	81			1439/05/09	MPC · JPL
X/1444 P1		1.0					1444/08/06	—
C/1449 Y1		1.0	0.32742	155.679			1449/12/09	MPC · JPL
C/1452 F1		1.0					1452/03/21	MPC · JPL
X/1453 A1		1.0					1453/01/04	—
C/1457 L1		1.0	0.76991	7.335			1457/08/08	MPC · JPL
C/1458 Y1		1.0	0.49	69			1458/11/07	MPC · JPL
X/1461 M1		1.0					1461/06/29	—
X/1461 P1		1.0					1461/08/05	—
C/1462 M1		1.0	0.25	130			1462/08/04	MPC · JPL
X/1465 E1		1.0					1465/03/15	—
C/1468 S1		1.0	0.85	138			1468/10/07	MPC · JPL
C/1471 Y1	Comet of 1471	1.0	0.48589	170.866			1471/03/01	MPC · JPL
C/1490 Y1		1.0	0.7376	51.65			1490/12/24	MPC · JPL
X/1495 A1		1.0					1495/01/07	—
C/1499 Q1		1.0	0.95	16			1499/09/09	MPC · JPL

== Early Modern Period ==
=== 1500s ===
Comet designation	Name/ discoverer(s)	e	q (AU)	i (°)	Abs. mag (M1)	Nucleus radii	Perihelion date	Ref
X/1502 W1		1.0					1502/11/28	—
C/1506 O1		1.0	0.84	115			1506/08/28	MPC · JPL
X/1520 C1		1.0					1520/02/15	—
X/1521 C1		1.0					1521/02/07	—
X/1523 N1		1.0					1523/07/15	—
X/1529 C1		1.0					1521/02/05	—
X/1532 E1		1.0					1532/03/09	—
C/1532 R1	Great Comet of 1532	1.0	0.51922	32.952			1532/10/18	MPC · JPL
C/1533 M1	Apian	1.0	0.25480	149.592			1533/06/15	MPC · JPL
X/1534 L1		1.0					1534/06/12	—
X/1536 F1		1.0					1536/03/24	—
C/1538 A1		1.0	0.1477	42.46			1537/12/30	MPC · JPL
C/1539 H1		1.0	0.961	18.6			1539/05/12	MPC · JPL
X/1545 Y1		1.0					1545/12/26	—
X/1554 M1		1.0					1554/06/23	—
C/1556 D1	Great Comet of 1556	1.0	0.49082	32.370			1556/04/22	MPC · JPL
C/1557 T1		1.0	0.5	42			1557/09/22	MPC · JPL
C/1558 P1	Hesse–Gemma	1.0	0.3155	76.4			1558/09/14	MPC · JPL
X/1569 V1		1.0					1569/11/09	—
C/1577 V1	Great Comet of 1577	1.0	0.1775	104.883			1577/10/27	MPC · JPL
C/1580 T1		1.0	0.60237	64.612			1580/11/28	MPC · JPL
C/1582 J1	Comet of 1582	1.0	0.16872	118.539			1582/05/06	MPC · JPL
X/1584 N1		1.0					1584/08/01	—
C/1585 T1		1.0	1.09485	6.135			1585/10/08	MPC · JPL
C/1590 E1		1.0	0.56773	150.451			1590/02/08	MPC · JPL
X/1591 G1		1.0					1591/04/03	—
C/1593 O1	Comet of 1593	1.0	0.08911	87.914			1593/07/19	MPC · JPL
C/1596 N1		1.0	0.56716	128.08			1596/07/25	MPC · JPL

=== 1600s ===
Comet designation	Name/ discoverer(s)	e	q (AU)	i (°)	Abs. mag (M1)	Nucleus radii	Perihelion date	Ref
X/1604 S1		1.0					1604/09/30	—
X/1609		1.0					1609	—
C/1618 Q1		1.0	0.51298	21.494			1618/08/17	MPC · JPL
C/1618 V1		1.0	0.007	143	4.0		1618/11/08	MPC · JPL
C/1618 W1	Great Comet of 1618	1.0	0.38954	81.001			1618/11/08	MPC · JPL
X/1621 J1		1.0					1621/05/12	—
C/1639 U1		1.0	0.816	61.7			1639/11/29	MPC · JPL
X/1640 X1		1.0					1640/12/12	—
C/1652 Y1		1.0	0.8475	79.461			1652/11/13	MPC · JPL
C/1664 W1	Great Comet of 1664	1.0	1.02553	158.697			1664/12/04	MPC · JPL
C/1665 F1	Great Comet of 1665	1.0	0.10649	103.893			1665/04/24	MPC · JPL
C/1668 E1	Great Comet of 1668	1.0	0.0666	144.381	6.0		1668/02/28	MPC · JPL
C/1672 E1		1.0	0.69546	82.972			1672/03/01	MPC · JPL
C/1677 H1		1.0	0.28059	100.928			1677/05/06	MPC · JPL
C/1683 O1		1.0	0.55958	96.738			1683/07/13	MPC · JPL
C/1684 N1		1.0	0.95827	65.424			1684/06/08	MPC · JPL
C/1686 R1	Great Comet of 1686	1.0	0.33602	34.969			1686/09/16	MPC · JPL
C/1689 X1		1.0	0.06443	63.204			1689/11/30	MPC · JPL
C/1695 U1	Jacob's comet	1.0	0.0423	93.589			1695/10/23	MPC · JPL
C/1698 R1		1.0	0.72865	169.094			1698/10/17	MPC · JPL
C/1699 D1		1.0	0.74862	109.424			1699/01/13	MPC · JPL

=== 1700s ===
Comet designation	Name/ discoverer(s)	e	q (AU)	i (°)	Abs. mag (M1)	Nucleus radii	Perihelion date	Ref
C/1701 U1		1.0	0.5926	138.37			1701/10/17	MPC · JPL
C/1702 H1	Comet of 1702	1.0	0.64683	4.375			1702/03/14	MPC · JPL
C/1706 F1		1.0	0.42686	55.27			1706/01/30	MPC · JPL
C/1707 W1		1.0	0.85904	88.646			1707/12/12	MPC · JPL
C/1718 B1		1.0	1.02543	148.838			1718/01/15	MPC · JPL
C/1723 T1		1.0	0.99879	130.028			1723/09/28	MPC · JPL
C/1729 P1	Sarabat	1.0	4.05054	77.095			1729/06/16	MPC · JPL
C/1733 K1		1.0	0.10297	23.792			1733/05/06	MPC · JPL
C/1737 C1	Bradley's comet	1.0	0.22282	18.326			1737/01/30	MPC · JPL
C/1739 K1	Zanotti	1.0	0.67358	124.26			1739/06/17	MPC · JPL
C/1742 C1		1.0	0.76577	112.948			1742/02/08	MPC · JPL
C/1743 C1		1.0	0.83818	2.28			1743/01/11	MPC · JPL
C/1743 Q1		1.0	0.52299	134.415			1743/09/21	MPC · JPL
C/1743 X1	Great Comet of 1744	1.0	0.222209	47.1417			1744/03/01	MPC · JPL
C/1746 P1	Chéseaux	1.0	2.19859	100.857			1747/03/03	MPC · JPL
C/1748 H1		1.0	0.84067	94.535			1748/04/29	MPC · JPL
C/1748 K1	Klinkenberg	1.0	0.62536	67.083			1748/06/19	MPC · JPL
C/1750 C1		1.0	0.2	132			1750/02/23	MPC · JPL
C/1757 R1	Gärtner	1.0	0.33738	12.828			1757/10/21	MPC · JPL
C/1758 K1	de la Nux	1.0	0.21535	68.3			1758/06/11	MPC · JPL
C/1760 A1	Great Comet of 1760	1.0	0.96576	175.126			1759/12/17	MPC · JPL
C/1760 B1	Messier	1.0	0.80139	79.084			1759/11/27	MPC · JPL
C/1762 K1	Klinkenberg	1.0	1.00905	85.668			1762/05/28	MPC · JPL
C/1763 S1	Messier	1.0	0.49818	72.497			1763/11/02	MPC · JPL
C/1764 A1	Messier	1.0	0.55522	127.089			1764/02/13	MPC · JPL
C/1766 E1	Messier	1.0	0.50532	139.152			1766/02/17	MPC · JPL
C/1771 A1	Great Comet of 1771	1.0	0.52824	148.555			1770/11/22	MPC · JPL
C/1771 G1	Messier	1.0	0.901835	11.2891			1771/04/19	MPC · JPL
C/1773 T1	Messier	1.0	1.12689	61.22			1773/09/06	MPC · JPL
C/1774 P1	Montaigne	1.0	1.42858	82.978			1774/08/15	MPC · JPL
C/1779 A1	Bode	1.0	0.713178	32.4406			1779/01/04	MPC · JPL
C/1780 U1	Montaigne-Olbers	1.0	0.51528	107.917			1780/11/29	MPC · JPL
C/1780 U2	Messier	1.0	0.09926	126.177			1780/10/01	MPC · JPL
C/1781 M1	Méchain	1.0	0.77586	81.724			1781/07/07	MPC · JPL
C/1781 T1	Méchain	1.0	0.961	152.801			1781/11/30	MPC · JPL
C/1783 X1	Great comet of 1783	1.0	0.70786	128.859			1784/01/21	MPC · JPL
C/1785 A1	Messier–Méchain	1.0	1.1434	70.238			1785/06/27	MPC · JPL
C/1786 P1	Herschel	1.0	0.410712	50.8921			1786/07/08	MPC · JPL
C/1787 G1	Méchain	1.0	0.34891	131.724			1787/05/11	MPC · JPL
C/1788 W1	Messier	1.0	1.06301	167.512			1788/11/10	MPC · JPL
C/1790 A1	Herschel	1.0	0.7581	148.068			1790/01/15	MPC · JPL
C/1790 H1	Herschel	1.0	0.79796	116.147			1790/05/21	MPC · JPL
C/1791 X1	Herschel	1.0	1.29258	140.211			1792/01/14	MPC · JPL
C/1793 A1	Gregory	1.0	0.96581	131.003			1972/12/27	MPC · JPL
C/1793 S1	Perny	1.0	1.504546	51.9362			1793/11/19	MPC · JPL
C/1793 S2	Messier	1.0	0.40344	119.642			1793/11/05	MPC · JPL
C/1796 F1	Olbers	1.0	1.579636	115.1716			1796/04/03	MPC · JPL
C/1797 P1	Bouvard–Herschel	1.0	0.52545	129.427			1797/07/09	MPC · JPL
C/1798 G1	Messier	1.0	0.48503	43.783			1798/04/05	MPC · JPL
C/1798 X1	Bouvard	1.0	0.77479	137.746			1799/01/01	MPC · JPL
C/1799 P1	Méchain	1.0	0.83986	129.062			1799/09/07	MPC · JPL
C/1799 Y1	Méchain	1.0	0.6258	102.996			1799/12/26	MPC · JPL

== 19th century ==
=== 1800s ===
Comet designation	Name/ discoverer(s)	e	q (AU)	i (°)	Abs. mag (M1)	Nucleus radii	Perihelion date	Ref
C/1801 N1	Pons	1.0	0.25641	159.267			1801/08/09	MPC · JPL
C/1802 Q1	Pons	1.0	1.094249	57.0108			1802/09/10	MPC · JPL
C/1804 E1	Pons	1.0	1.071168	56.4522			1804/02/14	MPC · JPL
C/1806 V1	Pons	1.0	1.081927	144.9537			1806/12/29	MPC · JPL
C/1808 F1	Pons	1.0	0.38986	134.303			1808/05/13	MPC · JPL
C/1808 M1	Pons	1.0	0.607953	140.705			1808/07/12	MPC · JPL
C/1808 R1	Pons	1.0	1.062	132.98			1808/09/14	MPC · JPL

=== 1810s ===
Comet designation	Name/ discoverer(s)	e	q (AU)	i (°)	Abs. mag (M1)	Nucleus radii	Perihelion date	Ref
C/1810 Q1	Pons	1.0	0.969623	62.9454			1810/10/06	MPC · JPL
C/1813 C1	Pons	1.0	0.699314	158.8486			1813/03/05	MPC · JPL
C/1813 G1	Pons	1.0	1.214703	99.0577			1813/05/20	MPC · JPL
C/1816 B1	Pons	1.0	0.0485	43.111			1816/03/01	MPC · JPL
C/1817 Y1	Pons	1.0	1.197821	89.7518			1818/02/26	MPC · JPL
C/1818 W2	Pons	1.0	0.855096	116.9058			1818/12/05	MPC · JPL
C/1819 N1	Great Comet of 1819	1.0	0.341514	80.7517			1819/06/28	MPC · JPL

=== 1820s ===
Comet designation	Name/ discoverer(s)	e	q (AU)	i (°)	Abs. mag (M1)	Nucleus radii	Perihelion date	Ref
C/1821 B1	Nicollet–Pons	1.0	0.091823	106.4613			1821/03/22	MPC · JPL
C/1822 J1	Gambart	1.0	0.504429	126.3969			1822/05/06	MPC · JPL
C/1822 K1	Pons	1.0	0.84713	143.6913			1822/07/16	MPC · JPL
C/1824 N1	Rümker	1.0	0.591671	125.4324			1824/07/12	MPC · JPL
C/1824 O1	Scheithauer	1.0	1.049835	54.5985			1824/09/29	MPC · JPL
C/1825 P1	Pons	1.0	0.883471	89.6749			1825/08/19	MPC · JPL
C/1825 V1	Pons	1.0	2.007734	39.9903			1826/04/22	MPC · JPL
C/1826 U1	Pons	1.0	0.026904	90.6234			1826/11/18	MPC · JPL
C/1826 Y1	Pons	1.0	0.506166	102.3898			1827/02/05	MPC · JPL
C/1827 P1	Pons	1.0	0.137758	125.8788			1827/09/12	MPC · JPL

=== 1830s ===
Comet designation	Name/ discoverer(s)	e	q (AU)	i (°)	Abs. mag (M1)	Nucleus radii	Perihelion date	Ref
C/1830 F1	Great Comet of 1830	1.0	0.921424	21.257			1830/04/09	MPC · JPL
C/1831 A1	Herapath	1.0	0.125887	135.263			1830/12/28	MPC · JPL
C/1832 O1	Gambart	1.0	1.183005	136.6727			1832/09/26	MPC · JPL
C/1833 S3	Dunlop	1.0	0.458122	7.3488			1833/09/10	MPC · JPL
C/1834 E1	Gambart	1.0	0.513106	5.9759			1834/04/03	MPC · JPL
C/1835 H1	Boguslawski	1.0	2.040153	170.8846			1835/03/27	MPC · JPL
C/1839 X1	Galle	1.0	0.618434	53.0716			1840/01/04	MPC · JPL

=== 1840s ===
Comet designation	Name/ discoverer(s)	e	q (AU)	i (°)	Abs. mag (M1)	Nucleus radii	Perihelion date	Ref
C/1840 E1	Galle	1.0	0.748504	79.8512			1840/04/02	MPC · JPL
C/1842 U1	Laugier	1.0	0.504685	106.4213			1842/12/16	MPC · JPL
C/1843 J1	Mauvais	1.0	1.616305	52.7241			1843/05/06	MPC · JPL
C/1844 Y2	d'Arrest	1.0	0.905204	46.8605			1845/01/08	MPC · JPL
C/1845 D1	de Vico	1.0	1.254549	56.4038			1845/04/21	MPC · JPL
C/1845 L1	Great June Comet of 1845	1.0	0.401077	131.0985			1845/06/06	MPC · JPL
C/1846 O1	de Vico–Hind	1.0	1.375992	122.3771			1846/05/28	MPC · JPL
C/1846 S1	de Vico	1.0	0.830669	49.7196			1846/10/30	MPC · JPL
C/1847 J1	Colla	1.000723	2.115749	100.4185			1847/06/05	MPC · JPL
C/1847 Q1	Schweizer	1.0	1.484824	147.3551			1847/08/09	MPC · JPL
C/1847 T1	Mitchell	1.000172	0.329025	108.1326			1847/11/14	MPC · JPL
C/1848 P1	Petersen	1.0	0.319947	95.5938			1848/09/08	MPC · JPL
C/1848 U1	Petersen	1.0	0.959782	85.04			1849/01/19	MPC · JPL
C/1849 G2	Goujon	1.00094	1.159406	67.1526			1849/05/26	MPC · JPL

=== 1850s ===
Comet designation	Name/ discoverer(s)	e	q (AU)	i (°)	Abs. mag (M1)	Nucleus radii	Perihelion date	Ref
C/1850 Q1	Bond	1.0	0.565586	40.0621			1850/10/19	MPC · JPL
C/1851 P1	Brorsen	1.0	0.984753	38.2035			1851/08/26	MPC · JPL
C/1851 U1	Brorsen	1.0	0.142053	73.9862			1851/10/01	MPC · JPL
C/1852 K1	Chacornac	1.0	0.905406	131.1243			1852/04/20	MPC · JPL
C/1853 E1	Secchi	1.0	1.092195	159.7566			1853/02/24	MPC · JPL
C/1853 L1	Klinkerfues	1.00025	0.306834	61.5008			1853/09/02	MPC · JPL
C/1853 R1	Bruhns	1.000664	0.172863	118.9963			1853/10/17	MPC · JPL
C/1853 W1	van Arsdale	1.0	2.044645	113.8757			1854/01/04	MPC · JPL
C/1854 F1	Great Comet of 1854	1.0	0.277064	97.4867			1854/03/24	MPC · JPL
C/1854 L1	Klinkerfues	1.0	0.648092	108.7032			1854/06/22	MPC · JPL
C/1855 V1	Bruhns	1.0	1.230983	169.824			1855/11/25	MPC · JPL
C/1857 D1	d'Arrest	1.0	0.772493	87.9479			1857/03/21	MPC · JPL
C/1857 M1	Klinkerfues	1.0	0.367535	121.0332			1857/07/18	MPC · JPL
C/1857 V1	Donati–van Arsdale	1.0	1.009088	142.1557			1857/11/19	MPC · JPL
C/1858 K1	Bruhns	1.0	0.544261	99.9713			1858/05/05	MPC · JPL
C/1858 R1	Tuttle	1.0	1.427002	158.7051			1858/10/13	MPC · JPL
C/1859 G1	Tempel	1.0	0.201032	95.4894			1859/05/29	MPC · JPL

=== 1860s ===
Comet designation	Name/ discoverer(s)	e	q (AU)	i (°)	Abs. mag (M1)	Nucleus radii	Perihelion date	Ref
C/1860 D1-A	Liais	1.0	1.198875	79.6819			1860/02/17	MPC · JPL
C/1860 D1-B	Liais	1.0	1.198174	79.6193			1860/02/17	MPC · JPL
C/1860 H1	Rümker	1.0	1.306664	48.236			1860/03/06	MPC · JPL
C/1860 M1	Great Comet of 1860	1.0	0.292885	79.3233			1860/06/16	MPC · JPL
C/1860 U1	Tempel	1.0	0.682653	32.2097			1860/09/22	MPC · JPL
C/1861 Y1	Tuttle	1.0	0.839027	138.0019			1861/12/07	MPC · JPL
C/1862 N1	Schmidt	1.0	0.981328	172.1091			1862/06/22	MPC · JPL
C/1862 W1	Respighi	1.0	0.803238	137.5412			1862/12/28	MPC · JPL
C/1862 X1	Bruhns	1.000049	0.794764	85.3553			1863/02/03	MPC · JPL
C/1863 T1	Baeker	1.000665	1.313114	83.3151			1863/12/29	MPC · JPL
C/1863 Y1	Respighi	1.0	0.771492	64.4906			1863/12/28	MPC · JPL
C/1864 R1	Donati	1.0	0.626106	134.9822			1864/07/28	MPC · JPL
C/1864 X1	Baeker	1.0	0.770731	48.8623			1864/12/22	MPC · JPL
C/1864 Y1	Bruhns	1.0	1.114634	162.8931			1864/12/28	MPC · JPL
C/1865 B1	Great Southern Comet of 1865	1.0	0.025844	92.4945			1865/01/14	MPC · JPL
C/1867 S1	Baeker–Winnecke	1.0	0.330359	96.5735			1867/11/07	MPC · JPL
C/1868 L1	Winnecke	1.0	0.578577	131.5581			1868/06/26	MPC · JPL
C/1869 T1	Tempel	1.0	1.230731	111.6853			1869/10/10	MPC · JPL

=== 1870s ===
Comet designation	Name/ discoverer(s)	e	q (AU)	i (°)	Abs. mag (M1)	Nucleus radii	Perihelion date	Ref
C/1870 K1	Winnecke	1.0	1.008692	121.7835			1870/07/14	MPC · JPL
C/1870 Q1	Coggia	1.0	1.816602	99.358			1870/09/02	MPC · JPL
C/1870 W1	Winnecke	1.0	0.389262	147.2703			1870/12/20	MPC · JPL
C/1871 L1	Tempel	1.0	1.083363	101.9782			1871/07/27	MPC · JPL
X/1872 X1	Pogson	1.0	0.0637	148.44			1872/12/16	—
C/1874 D1	Winnecke	1.0	0.044568	58.8932			1874/03/10	MPC · JPL
C/1874 G1	Winnecke	1.0	0.885773	148.4122			1874/03/14	MPC · JPL
C/1874 X1	Borrelly	1.0	0.508226	99.2205			1874/10/19	MPC · JPL
C/1877 C1	Borrelly	1.0	0.807441	152.8948			1877/01/19	MPC · JPL
C/1877 R1	Coggia	1.0	1.575904	102.2274			1877/09/11	MPC · JPL
C/1877 T1	Tempel	1.0	1.070451	115.7261			1877/06/27	MPC · JPL
C/1878 N1	Swift	1.0	1.391967	78.1761			1878/07/21	MPC · JPL
C/1879 M1	Swift	1.0	0.896547	107.044			1879/04/27	MPC · JPL
C/1879 Q1	Palisa	1.0	0.989608	77.1302			1879/10/05	MPC · JPL
C/1879 Q2	Hartwig	1.0	0.99148	107.7629			1879/08/29	MPC · JPL

=== 1880s ===
Comet designation	Name/ discoverer(s)	e	q (AU)	i (°)	Abs. mag (M1)	Nucleus radii	Perihelion date	Ref
C/1880 C1	Great Southern Comet of 1880	1.0	0.005494	144.6666	7.1–8.9	0.7 km	1880/01/28	MPC · JPL
C/1880 G1	Schaeberle	1.000813	1.814412	123.0563			1880/07/02	MPC · JPL
C/1880 S1	Hartwig	1.0	0.354634	141.9119			1880/09/07	MPC · JPL
C/1880 Y1	Pechule	1.0	0.659736	60.7007			1880/11/09	MPC · JPL
C/1881 J1	Swift	1.0	0.59109	77.9336			1881/05/20	MPC · JPL
C/1881 N1	Schaeberle	1.0	0.633542	140.2281			1881/08/22	MPC · JPL
C/1881 S1	Barnard	1.0	0.4492	112.816			1881/09/14	MPC · JPL
X/1882 K1	Tewfik	1.0	—	—			1882/05/20	—
C/1882 R2	Barnard	1.0	0.955567	96.1466			1882/11/13	MPC · JPL
C/1883 D1	Brooks–Swift	1.0	0.760062	78.0648			1883/02/19	MPC · JPL
C/1884 A1	Ross	1.0	0.309607	114.977			1883/12/25	MPC · JPL
C/1885 N1	Barnard	1.0	2.506732	80.624			1885/08/06	MPC · JPL
C/1885 X1	Fabry	1.000442	0.642381	82.6297			1886/04/06	MPC · JPL
C/1885 X2	Barnard	1.00023	0.479254	84.4391			1886/05/03	MPC · JPL
C/1885 Y1	Brooks	1.0	1.079545	42.4422	4.9		1885/11/26	MPC · JPL
C/1886 J1	Brooks	1.0	0.84199	100.218			1886/05/04	MPC · JPL
C/1886 T1	Barnard–Hartwig	1.000408	0.663317	101.6154			1886/12/16	MPC · JPL
C/1887 B1	Great Southern Comet of 1887	1.0	0.00483	144.383	6.3	1.2 km	1887/01/11	MPC · JPL
C/1887 B3	Barnard	1.0	1.480714	85.5867			1886/11/28	MPC · JPL
C/1887 D1	Barnard	1.0	1.006455	139.7763			1887/03/28	MPC · JPL
C/1888 R1	Barnard	1.00123	1.814916	166.3842			1889/01/31	MPC · JPL
C/1889 X1	Borrelly	1.0	0.269796	56.7537			1890/01/26	MPC · JPL

=== 1890s ===
Comet designation	Name/ discoverer(s)	e	q (AU)	i (°)	Abs. mag (M1)	Nucleus radii	Perihelion date	Ref
C/1890 F1	Brooks	1.000266	1.907582	120.569			1890/06/02	MPC · JPL
C/1890 O1	Coggia	1.0	0.764087	63.3509			1890/07/09	MPC · JPL
C/1891 F1	Barnard–Denning	1.0	0.397896	120.5116	8.8		1891/04/28	MPC · JPL
C/1891 T1	Barnard	1.0	0.971089	77.988			1891/11/14	MPC · JPL
C/1892 F1	Denning	1.000371	1.970726	89.6959			1892/05/11	MPC · JPL
C/1892 Q1	Brooks	1.000441	0.975989	24.8012			1892/12/28	MPC · JPL
C/1892 W1	Brooks	1.0	1.195108	143.8494			1893/01/06	MPC · JPL
C/1895 W1	Perrine	1.000051	0.191978	141.6263			1895/12/18	MPC · JPL
C/1895 W2	Brooks	1.0	0.843034	76.2461			1895/10/21	MPC · JPL
C/1896 C1	Perrine–Lamp	1.0	0.587289	155.7381			1896/02/01	MPC · JPL
C/1896 G1	Swift	1.000476	0.566286	55.56			1896/04/18	MPC · JPL
C/1896 R1	Sperra	1.0	1.142895	88.4215			1896/07/11	MPC · JPL
C/1896 V1	Perrine	1.000983	1.062791	146.1365			1897/02/08	MPC · JPL
C/1897 U1	Perrine	1.0	1.356679	69.6101			1897/12/09	MPC · JPL
C/1898 L1	Coddington–Pauly	1.000934	1.701595	69.9358	5.0		1898/09/14	MPC · JPL
C/1898 L2	Perrine	1.0	0.626438	70.03			1898/08/16	MPC · JPL
C/1898 M1	Giacobini	1.0	1.501318	166.8542			1898/07/25	MPC · JPL
C/1898 R1	Perrine–Chofardet	1.0	0.420373	28.8596			1898/10/01	MPC · JPL
C/1898 U1	Brooks	1.0	0.756011	140.3448			1898/11/23	MPC · JPL
C/1899 E1	Swift	1.000327	0.326564	146.2703			1899/04/13	MPC · JPL
C/1899 S1	Giacobini	1.0	1.785838	76.9442			1899/09/15	MPC · JPL

== Early 20th century ==
=== 1900s ===
Comet designation	Name/ discoverer(s)	e	q (AU)	i (°)	Abs. mag (M1)	Nucleus radii	Perihelion date	Ref
C/1900 B1	Giacobini	1.001058	1.331529	146.4486			1900/04/29	MPC · JPL
C/1900 O1	Borrelly–Brooks	1.00029	1.014833	62.5328	8.1		1900/08/03	MPC · JPL
C/1902 G1	Brooks	1.0	0.44392	65.201			1902/05/17	MPC · JPL
C/1902 X1	Giacobini	1.000603	2.773525	43.8956			1903/03/23	MPC · JPL
C/1903 H1	Grigg	1.0	0.49942	66.4835			1903/03/25	MPC · JPL
C/1903 M1	Borrelly	1.000406	0.330182	85.0155			1903/08/28	MPC · JPL
C/1904 H1	Brooks	1.0031	2.70796	125.1315			1904/03/07	MPC · JPL
C/1904 Y1	Giacobini	1.000678	1.882049	99.5989			1904/11/03	MPC · JPL
C/1905 W1	Schaer	1.0	1.052201	140.5768			1905/10/26	MPC · JPL
C/1905 X1	Giacobini	1.0	0.2159	43.6521			1906/01/22	MPC · JPL
C/1906 E1	Kopff	1.0014	3.342	4.2825	5.2512		1905/08/18	MPC · JPL
C/1906 F1	Ross	1.0	0.722913	83.4615			1906/02/21	MPC · JPL
C/1907 E1	Giacobini	1.001003	2.051705	141.6595			1907/03/19	MPC · JPL
C/1907 T1	Mellish	1.00008	0.982978	119.6374	9.8		1907/09/14	MPC · JPL
C/1908 R1	Morehouse	1.0005	0.9452	140.176	4.1		1908/12/26	MPC · JPL

=== 1910s ===
Comet designation	Name/ discoverer(s)	e	q (AU)	i (°)	Abs. mag (M1)	Nucleus radii	Perihelion date	Ref
C/1911 S3	Belyavsky	1.000147	0.303424	96.4659	5.8		1911/10/10	MPC · JPL
C/1912 R1	Gale	1.000451	0.716079	79.8097	6.1		1912/10/05	MPC · JPL
C/1912 V1	Borrelly	1.0	1.107108	124.6351			1912/10/21	MPC · JPL
C/1913 Y1	Delavan	1.000155	1.104459	68.0388	4.8		1914/10/26	MPC · JPL
C/1914 F1	Kritzinger	1.000106	1.198527	23.9138			1914/06/04	MPC · JPL
C/1914 J1	Zlatinsky	1.0	0.543135	112.9822			1914/05/08	MPC · JPL
C/1914 M1	Neujmin	1.00329	3.7468	71.041			1914/07/30	MPC · JPL
C/1915 C1	Mellish	1.000151	1.005286	54.7922	4.5		1915/07/17	MPC · JPL
C/1915 R1	Mellish	1.00	0.465	52.3			1915/10/13	MPC · JPL
C/1917 H1	Schaumasse	1.0	0.764184	158.7379			1917/05/18	MPC · JPL
C/1918 L1	Reid	1.0	1.101641	69.7093			1918/06/06	MPC · JPL
C/1919 Q2	Metcalf	1.000222	1.115291	46.3823			1919/12/07	MPC · JPL
C/1919 Y1	Skjellerup	1.0	0.29769	123.175			1920/01/03	MPC · JPL

=== 1920s ===
Comet designation	Name/ discoverer(s)	e	q (AU)	i (°)	Abs. mag (M1)	Nucleus radii	Perihelion date	Ref
C/1921 E1	Reid	1.000357	1.008457	132.1876			1921/05/10	MPC · JPL
X/1921 P1	Lick	1.0	~0.1				1921/08/07	—
C/1922 U1	Baade	1.001	2.25883	51.457			1922/10/26	MPC · JPL
C/1923 T1	Dubiago–Bernard	1.0	0.777832	113.792			1923/11/18	MPC · JPL
C/1924 R1	Finsler	1.0	0.405993	120.1495			1924/09/04	MPC · JPL
C/1925 F1	Shajn–Solà	1.002432	4.180785	146.7131	2.5		1925/09/06	MPC · JPL
C/1925 G1	Orkisz	1.000605	1.109477	100.0224	5.4		1925/04/01	MPC · JPL
C/1925 V1	Wilk–Peltier	1.000505	0.763569	144.598	9.6		1925/12/07	MPC · JPL
C/1925 W1	Van Biesbroeck	1.000382	1.566243	49.3307			1925/10/02	MPC · JPL
C/1925 X1	Ensor	1.0	0.322588	123.0003			1926/02/11	MPC · JPL
C/1927 A1	Blathwayt	1.0	1.03557	92.363			1927/02/14	MPC · JPL
C/1927 B1	Reid	1.0	0.75164	83.6631			1926/12/30	MPC · JPL

=== 1930s ===
Comet designation	Name/ discoverer(s)	e	q (AU)	i (°)	Abs. mag (M1)	Nucleus radii	Perihelion date	Ref
C/1930 E1	Beyer	1.000524	2.078632	71.9693			1930/04/18	MPC · JPL
C/1930 L1	Forbes	1.0	1.1528	97.0912	12.5		1930/05/10	MPC · JPL
C/1932 H1	Carrasco	1.0	2.330615	58.0633			1931/11/30	MPC · JPL
C/1932 M1	Newman	1.000602	1.647412	78.3894			1932/09/24	MPC · JPL
C/1932 M2	Geddes	1.001431	2.313581	124.9886			1932/09/21	MPC · JPL
C/1933 D1	Peltier	1.0	1.000691	86.6786			1933/02/06	MPC · JPL
C/1935 M1	Jackson	1.0	3.4857	141.9494			1934/09/06	MPC · JPL
C/1935 Q1	Van Biesbroeck	1.002045	4.043409	66.1122			1936/05/11	MPC · JPL
C/1937 C1	Whipple	1.000137	1.733791	41.5515			1937/06/20	MPC · JPL

=== 1940s ===
Comet designation	Name/ discoverer(s)	e	q (AU)	i (°)	Abs. mag (M1)	Nucleus radii	Perihelion date	Ref
C/1940 R2	Cunningham	1.000485	0.367751	49.8942			1941/01/16	MPC · JPL
C/1940 S1	Okabayasi–Honda	1.001459	1.061768	133.1141			1940/08/15	MPC · JPL
C/1941 K1	van Gent	1.000243	0.874789	94.5165			1941/09/03	MPC · JPL
C/1942 C1	Whipple–Bernasconi–Kulin	1.000893	1.445303	79.452	4.4		1942/04/30	MPC · JPL
C/1942 C2	Oterma	1.003183	4.113405	172.5144			1942/09/27	MPC · JPL
C/1943 R1	Damaica	1.0	0.7583	161.3186			1943/08/21	MPC · JPL
C/1943 W1	van Gent–Peltier–Damaica	1.0	0.8743	136.181	10.0		1944/01/12	MPC · JPL
C/1944 K2	van Gent	1.002085	2.225933	95.0056			1944/07/17	MPC · JPL
C/1945 L1	du Toit	1.0	0.998063	156.508			1945/05/17	MPC · JPL
C/1945 W1	Friend–Peltier	1.0	0.19435	49.48			1945/12/17	MPC · JPL
C/1945 X1	du Toit	1.0	0.007516	141.8734		0.3 km	1945/12/27	MPC · JPL
C/1946 C1	Timmers	1.001169	1.724129	72.8427			1946/04/13	MPC · JPL
C/1946 K1	Pajdušáková–Rotbart–Weber	1.0	1.018252	169.5619			1946/05/11	MPC · JPL
C/1946 P1	Jones	1.000776	1.136113	56.9647	8.4575		1946/10/26	MPC · JPL
C/1946 U1	Bester	1.000947	2.407663	108.1742	9.7068		1947/02/07	MPC · JPL
C/1947 F2	Bečvář	1.0	0.961836	129.1558			1947/05/03	MPC · JPL
C/1947 K1	Bester	1.0	1.402863	111.4094			1947/05/31	MPC · JPL
C/1947 O1	Wirtanen	1.001052	2.827968	97.3313			1947/07/18	MPC · JPL
C/1947 S1	Bester	1.000363	0.748125	140.5681	9.8393	18.5 km	1948/02/16	MPC · JPL
C/1947 V1	Honda	1.0	0.75309	106.291			1947/11/17	MPC · JPL
C/1947 Y1	Mrkos	1.001085	1.499557	77.5331			1948/02/16	MPC · JPL
C/1948 E1	Pajdušáková	1.000787	2.107056	92.9194			1948/05/16	MPC · JPL
C/1948 R1	Johnson	1.0	4.70838	53.2325			1948/04/08	MPC · JPL
C/1948 T1	Wirtanen	1.002278	3.261102	155.0779			1947/09/04	MPC · JPL
C/1949 K1	Johnson	1.000713	2.553231	131.3511			1950/01/19	MPC · JPL

=== 1950s ===
Comet designation	Name/ discoverer(s)	e	q (AU)	i (°)	Abs. mag (M1)	Nucleus radii	Perihelion date	Ref
C/1950 K1	Minkowski	1.001231	2.572335	144.1552			1951/01/15	MPC · JPL
C/1951 C1	Pajdušáková	1.0	0.719063	87.8968	9.4		1951/01/30	MPC · JPL
C/1951 G1	Groeneveld	1.013	3.63	18.65	5.9		1951/11/08	MPC · JPL
C/1951 G2	Groeneveld	1.001	3.63	170.65	5.9		1950/07/11	MPC · JPL
C/1952 W1	Mrkos	1.000343	0.777729	97.1837			1953/01/24	MPC · JPL
C/1953 T1	Abell	1.00069	0.970091	53.22814			1954/07/07	MPC · JPL
C/1953 X1	Pajdušáková	1.0	0.072347	13.5729			1954/01/24	MPC · JPL
C/1954 M1	Harrington	1.0	2.060608	136.6445			1954/01/18	MPC · JPL
C/1954 M2	Kresák	1.000174	0.746377	88.5406			1954/08/29	MPC · JPL
C/1954 O1	Vozarova	1.000286	0.677461	116.1542	7.1		1954/06/01	MPC · JPL
C/1954 O2	Baade	1.000509	3.869934	100.3891			1955/08/13	MPC · JPL
C/1954 Y1	Haro–Chavira	1.004667	4.076871	79.5999			1956/01/26	MPC · JPL
C/1955 G1	Abell	1.002791	4.49568	123.9327			1954/03/24	MPC · JPL
C/1955 O1	Honda	1.000947	0.884616	107.5221	6.8		1955/08/04	MPC · JPL
C/1956 E1	Mrkos	1.0	0.84224	147.4519			1956/04/13	MPC · JPL
C/1956 F1-A	Wirtanen	1.002745	4.447262	33.2017	5.9		1957/09/02	MPC · JPL
C/1956 R1	Arend–Roland	1.000244	0.3160418	119.94447	5.4		1957/04/08	MPC · JPL
C/1957 U1	Latyshev–Wild–Burnham	1.0	0.53913	156.7154	10.6		1957/12/05	MPC · JPL
C/1959 O1	Bester–Hoffmeister	1.002679	1.250534	12.8322	9.9		1959/07/17	MPC · JPL
C/1959 Q1	Alcock	1.000919	1.150354	48.2566			1959/08/17	MPC · JPL
C/1959 Q2	Alcock	1.0	0.165507	107.7622			1959/09/15	MPC · JPL
C/1959 Y1	Burnham	1.000145	0.504353	159.6002			1960/03/20	MPC · JPL

=== 1960s ===
Comet designation	Name/ discoverer(s)	e	q (AU)	i (°)	Abs. mag (M1)	Nucleus radii	Perihelion date	Ref
C/1960 B1	Burnham	1.0	1.170751	69.501			1959/09/27	MPC · JPL
C/1960 M1	Humason	1.000884	4.266927	125.4695			1959/12/11	MPC · JPL
C/1962 C1	Seki–Lines	1.000003	0.031397	65.0142			1962/04/01	MPC · JPL
C/1962 H1	Honda	1.0	0.653093	72.8735			1962/04/20	MPC · JPL
C/1965 S2	Alcock	1.0	1.2939	65.0092			1965/10/26	MPC · JPL
C/1966 R1	Ikeya–Everhart	1.0	0.88188	48.279			1966/08/05	MPC · JPL
C/1966 T1	Rudnicki	1.000391	0.419225	9.0798			1967/01/20	MPC · JPL
C/1967 C1	Seki	1.0	0.457263	106.4756			1967/03/13	MPC · JPL
C/1967 C2	Wild	1.0	1.327158	99.1058			1967/03/02	MPC · JPL
C/1967 M1	Mitchell–Jones–Gerber	1.0	0.178251	56.7083			1967/06/16	MPC · JPL
C/1968 L1	Whitaker	1.0	1.234003	61.7687			1968/06/04	MPC · JPL
C/1968 N1	Honda	1.0007	1.16043	143.2383	5.2		1968/08/07	MPC · JPL
C/1968 Q1	Bally–Clayton	1.0	1.771085	93.1695			1968/08/20	MPC · JPL
C/1968 Q2	Honda	1.0	1.098991	127.9128			1968/11/03	MPC · JPL
C/1968 U1	Wild	1.0	2.60907	135.165			1968/03/31	MPC · JPL
C/1969 P1	Fujikawa	1.0	0.773917	8.9257			1969/10/12	MPC · JPL

=== 1970s ===
Comet designation	Name/ discoverer(s)	e	q (AU)	i (°)	Abs. mag (M1)	Nucleus radii	Perihelion date	Ref
C/1970 B1	Daido–Fujikawa	1.0	0.065742	100.176			1970/02/15	MPC · JPL
C/1970 K1	White–Ortiz–Bolelli	1.0	0.008879	139.0714		1.1 km	1970/05/14	MPC · JPL
C/1970 N1	Abe	1.000048	1.112539	126.7199			1970/10/20	MPC · JPL
C/1970 U1	Suzuki–Sato–Seki	1.0	0.405499	60.7849			1970/10/01	MPC · JPL
C/1971 E1	Toba	1.000775	1.233292	109.6825			1971/04/17	MPC · JPL
C/1971 M1	Edwards	1.0	2.88	97.15			1971/12/07	MPC · JPL
C/1972 L1	Sandage	1.006288	4.275707	79.3681			1972/11/14	MPC · JPL
C/1972 U1	Kojima	1.001018	2.147032	141.8554			1973/02/12	MPC · JPL
C/1973 A1	Heck–Sause	1.000501	2.511124	138.6283			1972/10/05	MPC · JPL
C/1973 E1	Kohoutek	1.000008	0.142425	14.3043			1973/12/28	MPC · JPL
C/1973 N1	Sandage	1.000059	4.812056	137.4032			1973/11/08	MPC · JPL
C/1973 W1	Gibson	1.000643	3.84207	108.0665			1973/08/09	MPC · JPL
C/1974 V1	van den Bergh	1.003948	6.018928	60.8537			1974/08/07	MPC · JPL
C/1974 V2	Bennett	1.0	0.864646	134.8269			1974/12/01	MPC · JPL
C/1975 E1	Bradfield	1.00141	1.216948	55.2438	12		1975/04/04	MPC · JPL
C/1975 N1	Kobayashi–Berger–Milon	1.000097	0.425561	80.7812			1975/09/05	MPC · JPL
C/1975 V2	Bradfield	1.000012	0.2187206	70.6263	10.4		1975/12/21	MPC · JPL
C/1975 X1	Sato	1.001214	0.863968	93.9552			1976/01/03	MPC · JPL
C/1976 D2	Schuster	1.002099	6.880674	112.0259			1975/01/15	MPC · JPL
C/1976 E1	Bradfield	1.0	0.67832	147.778			1976/02/25	MPC · JPL
C/1976 U1	Lovas	1.003931	5.857415	86.6321			1976/07/06	MPC · JPL
C/1977 D1	Lovas	1.003506	5.715207	64.5266			1976/10/31	MPC · JPL
C/1977 H1	Helin	1.0	1.117568	43.1952			1977/06/30	MPC · JPL
C/1978 A1	West	1.002964	5.606362	116.93			1977/07/21	MPC · JPL
C/1978 C1	Bradfield	1.0	0.436585	51.0863			1978/03/17	MPC · JPL
C/1978 G2	McNaught–Tritton	1.002136	6.282837	153.1829			1978/08/24	MPC · JPL
C/1978 H1	Meier	1.00085	1.136524	43.7614			1978/11/11	MPC · JPL
C/1978 R3	Machholz	1.000416	1.771588	130.6364			1978/08/13	MPC · JPL
C/1978 T3	Bradfield	1.0	0.43187	138.2649			1978/09/29	MPC · JPL
C/1978 M1	Bradfield	1.000059	0.413217	136.2293			1979/07/23	MPC · JPL
C/1979 M3	Torres	1.00106	4.686916	92.1782			1979/07/15	MPC · JPL
C/1979 Q1	Solwind	1.0	0.0048	141.456			1979/08/30	MPC · JPL

== Late 20th century ==
=== 1980 ===
Comet designation	Name/ discoverer(s)	e	q (AU)	i (°)	Abs. mag (M1)	Nucleus radii	Perihelion date	Ref
C/1980 E1	Bowell	1.0575	3.363942	1.66173	6		1982/03/12	MPC · JPL
C/1980 L1	Torres	1.000164	2.583897	73.1503			1980/04/19	MPC · JPL
C/1980 O1	Cernis–Petrauskas	1.0	0.522744	49.0681			1980/06/22	MPC · JPL
C/1980 R1	Russell	1.001723	2.112441	128.7068			1981/03/06	MPC · JPL

=== 1981 ===
Comet designation	Name/ discoverer(s)	e	q (AU)	i (°)	Abs. mag (M1)	Nucleus radii	Perihelion date	Ref
C/1981 B1	Solwind	1.0	0.00792	140.676			1981/01/27	MPC · JPL
C/1981 G1	Elias	1.000659	4.742518	115.3105			1981/08/18	MPC · JPL
C/1981 O1	Solwind	1.0	0.00612	141.706			1981/07/20	MPC · JPL
C/1981 V1	Solwind	1.0	0.0045	143.847			1981/11/04	MPC · JPL
C/1981 W1	Solwind	1.0	0.0048	135.48			1981/11/20	MPC · JPL

=== 1983 ===
Comet designation	Name/ discoverer(s)	e	q (AU)	i (°)	Abs. mag (M1)	Nucleus radii	Perihelion date	Ref
C/1983 J2	IRAS	1.0	1.416483	152.1911			1983/01/19	MPC · JPL
C/1983 N2	Solwind	1.0	0.0049	142.23			1983/07/07	MPC · JPL
C/1983 O1	Cernis	1.001503	3.317996	134.69526	4.2	10.5 km	1983/07/21	MPC · JPL
C/1983 O2	IRAS	1.000196	2.254776	120.7372			1983/11/28	MPC · JPL
C/1983 R1	Shoemaker	1.000152	3.344888	137.5972			1983/11/23	MPC · JPL
C/1983 S2	Solwind	1.0	0.00753	143.987			1983/09/25	MPC · JPL

=== 1984 ===
Comet designation	Name/ discoverer(s)	e	q (AU)	i (°)	Abs. mag (M1)	Nucleus radii	Perihelion date	Ref
C/1984 K1	Shoemaker	1.00072	2.696508	116.665		6.4 km	1985/09/04	MPC · JPL
C/1984 O2	Solwind	1.0	0.01541	136.386			1984/07/28	MPC · JPL
C/1984 Q1	Solwind	1.0	0.0049	144.14			1984/08/23	MPC · JPL
C/1984 R1	Solwind	1.0	0.1051	36.92			1984/09/17	MPC · JPL
C/1984 S1	Meier	1.0	0.856856	145.6146			1984/10/13	MPC · JPL

=== 1985 ===
Comet designation	Name/ discoverer(s)	e	q (AU)	i (°)	Abs. mag (M1)	Nucleus radii	Perihelion date	Ref
C/1985 K1	Machholz	1.0	0.106252	16.2766			1985/06/28	MPC · JPL

=== 1986 ===
Comet designation	Name/ discoverer(s)	e	q (AU)	i (°)	Abs. mag (M1)	Nucleus radii	Perihelion date	Ref
C/1986 P1	Wilson	1.00029	1.1996494	147.11895	5.2		1987/04/20	MPC · JPL
C/1986 P1-A	Wilson	1.000312	1.199651	147.1191		5–7 km	1987/04/20	MPC · JPL
C/1986 P1-B	Wilson	1.000797	1.199345	147.1192			1987/04/20	MPC · JPL

=== 1987 ===
Comet designation	Name/ discoverer(s)	e	q (AU)	i (°)	Abs. mag (M1)	Nucleus radii	Perihelion date	Ref
C/1987 A1	Levy	1.000383	0.921485	96.583			1986/12/17	MPC · JPL
C/1987 F1	Torres	1.001008	3.624588	124.08		5.9 km	1987/04/10	MPC · JPL
C/1987 H1	Shoemaker	1.002839	5.457548	132.4743		4.0 km	1986/11/17	MPC · JPL
C/1987 Q1	Rudenko	1.000437	0.602603	114.8751			1987/10/09	MPC · JPL
C/1987 T1	Levy	1.0	0.515185	62.5345			1987/09/09	MPC · JPL
C/1987 T2	SMM	1.0	0.00538	144.256			1987/10/06	MPC · JPL
C/1987 U4	SMM	1.0	0.00627	144.466			1987/10/18	MPC · JPL
C/1987 W1	Ichimura	1.0	0.1995	41.62	9.2		1988/01/10	MPC · JPL
C/1987 W2	Furuyama	1.000202	1.679526	117.7834			1988/03/03	MPC · JPL
C/1987 W3	Jensen	1.004767	3.332819	76.7159			1988/01/18	MPC · JPL

=== 1988 ===
Comet designation	Name/ discoverer(s)	e	q (AU)	i (°)	Abs. mag (M1)	Nucleus radii	Perihelion date	Ref
C/1988 B1	Shoemaker	1.002519	5.030826	80.5858	5.6	6.1 km	1987/03/20	MPC · JPL
C/1988 C1	Maury–Phinney	1.0	1.930534	95.157			1987/12/26	MPC · JPL
C/1988 L1	Shoemaker–Holt–Rodriquez	1.00067	2.474292	97.68842	7.1		1989/07/12	MPC · JPL
C/1988 M1	SMM	1.0	0.00516	144.706		0.016 km	1988/06/27	MPC · JPL
C/1988 P1	Machholz	1.0	0.164558	40.199			1988/09/17	MPC · JPL
C/1988 Q1	SMM	1.0	0.00591	144.436		0.016 km	1988/08/21	MPC · JPL
C/1988 T1	SMM	1.0	0.00513	144.786		0.016 km	1988/10/12	MPC · JPL
C/1988 U1	SMM	1.0	0.00579	144.716		0.016 km	1988/10/24	MPC · JPL
C/1988 W1	SMM	1.0	0.0059	144.796		0.016 km	1988/11/18	MPC · JPL
C/1988 Y1	Yanaka	1.0	0.427818	71.0077	12.4		1988/12/11	MPC · JPL

=== 1989 ===
Comet designation	Name/ discoverer(s)	e	q (AU)	i (°)	Abs. mag (M1)	Nucleus radii	Perihelion date	Ref
C/1989 A6	Shoemaker	1.0	2.207834	25.505			1988/11/02	MPC · JPL
C/1989 L1	SMM	1.0	0.00557	144.636		0.016 km	1989/06/02	MPC · JPL
C/1989 N3	SMM	1.0	0.00462	144.786		0.016 km	1989/07/08	MPC · JPL
C/1989 Q1	Okazaki–Levy–Rudenko	1.000051	0.642337	90.1466	8.2	1.0 km	1989/11/11	MPC · JPL
C/1989 R1	Helin–Roman	1.0	1.324502	128.1341			1989/08/20	MPC · JPL
C/1989 S1	SMM	1.0	0.00476	144.768		0.016 km	1989/09/28	MPC · JPL
C/1989 W1	Aarseth–Brewington	1.000092	0.300687	88.3876	8.2		1989/12/27	MPC · JPL
C/1989 X1	Austin	1.0002273	0.3497741	58.9564	8.4		1990/04/09	MPC · JPL
C/1989 Y1	Skoritchenko–George	1.000298	1.569169	59.36588	5.1		1990/04/11	MPC · JPL
C/1989 Y2	McKenzie–Russell	1.0	1.975817	160.3369			1989/11/07	MPC · JPL

=== 1990 ===
Comet designation	Name/ discoverer(s)	e	q (AU)	i (°)	Abs. mag (M1)	Nucleus radii	Perihelion date	Ref
C/1990 E1	Cernis–Kiuchi–Nakamura	1.0	1.068339	48.1425			1990/03/17	MPC · JPL
C/1990 K1	Levy	1.000633	0.9387154	131.58391	4.4		1990/10/24	MPC · JPL
C/1990 M1	McNaught–Hughes	1.001198	2.682238	132.7742			1991/02/27	MPC · JPL

=== 1991 ===
Comet designation	Name/ discoverer(s)	e	q (AU)	i (°)	Abs. mag (M1)	Nucleus radii	Perihelion date	Ref
C/1991 C3	McNaught–Russell	1.001769	4.777087	113.4304			1990/10/18	MPC · JPL
C/1991 F2	Helen–Lawrence	1.000431	1.517721	95.4565			1992/06/20	MPC · JPL
C/1991 L4	Helin–Alu	1.000083	4.849913	49.2952			1992/02/19	MPC · JPL
C/1991 X2	Mueller	1.00026	0.19885	95.589	12		1992/03/21	MPC · JPL
C/1991 Y1	Zanotta–Brewington	1.000058	0.6439688	50.0286	10.2		1992/01/31	MPC · JPL

=== 1992 ===
Comet designation	Name/ discoverer(s)	e	q (AU)	i (°)	Abs. mag (M1)	Nucleus radii	Perihelion date	Ref
C/1992 A1	Helin–Alu	1.004149	3.016578	39.2638			1992/07/08	MPC · JPL
C/1992 B1	Bradfield	1.0	0.500157	20.2378			1992/03/19	MPC · JPL
C/1992 J2	Bradfield	1.0	0.592305	158.5644			1992/05/25	MPC · JPL
C/1992 N1	Machholz	1.0	0.819198	57.6407			1992/07/10	MPC · JPL

=== 1993 ===
Comet designation	Name/ discoverer(s)	e	q (AU)	i (°)	Abs. mag (M1)	Nucleus radii	Perihelion date	Ref
C/1993 A1	Mueller	1.001779	1.937531	124.8778	8.1		1994/01/12	MPC · JPL
C/1993 F1	Mueller	1.005773	5.900474	53.9401	6.4		1992/08/04	MPC · JPL
C/1993 K1	Shoemaker–Levy	1.0003	4.84926	67.76692	7.3		1994/02/01	MPC · JPL
C/1993 Q1	Mueller	1.00032	0.967257	105.02651	8		1994/03/26	MPC · JPL

=== 1994 ===
Comet designation	Name/ discoverer(s)	e	q (AU)	i (°)	Abs. mag (M1)	Nucleus radii	Perihelion date	Ref
C/1994 G1-B	Takamizawa–Levy	1.0	1.361154	132.8584			1994/05/22	MPC · JPL
C/1994 N1	Nakamura–Nishimura–Machholz	1.000057	1.14015	94.3789	11.3		1994/07/12	MPC · JPL

=== 1995 ===
Comet designation	Name/ discoverer(s)	e	q (AU)	i (°)	Abs. mag (M1)	Nucleus radii	Perihelion date	Ref
C/1995 Y1	Hyakutake	1.000242	1.054614	54.4659	9.9	1.14 km	1996/02/24	MPC · JPL

=== 1996 ===
Comet designation	Name/ discoverer(s)	e	q (AU)	i (°)	Abs. mag (M1)	Nucleus radii	Perihelion date	Ref
C/1996 E1	NEAT	1.000915	1.358955	114.47533	11.2		1996/07/27	MPC · JPL
C/1996 J1-A	Evans–Drinkwater	1.00103	1.29771	22.51637	6.5		1996/12/30	MPC · JPL
C/1996 J1-B	Evans–Drinkwater	1.00059	1.299084	22.51139	9		1996/12/30	MPC · JPL
C/1996 N1	Brewington	1.00057	0.925821	52.1479	11.9		1996/08/03	MPC · JPL
C/1996 N3	SOHO	1.0	0.0351	72.12			1996/07/03	MPC · JPL
C/1996 P2	Russell–Watson	1.00008	2.005849	29.08317	5		1996/03/01	MPC · JPL
C/1996 V2	SOHO	1.0	0.0488	33.41			1996/11/11	MPC · JPL
C/1996 X3	SOHO	1.0	0.0426	14.78			1996/12/06	MPC · JPL
C/1996 X4	SOHO	1.0	0.0492	13.7			1996/12/06	MPC · JPL
C/1996 X5	SOHO	1.0	0.049	13.78			1996/12/06	MPC · JPL

=== 1997 ===
Comet designation	Name/ discoverer(s)	e	q (AU)	i (°)	Abs. mag (M1)	Nucleus radii	Perihelion date	Ref
C/1997 A1	NEAT	1.00213	3.157168	145.07171	9.5		1997/06/19	MPC · JPL
C/1997 B4	SOHO	1.0	0.0573	132.78			1997/01/21	MPC · JPL
C/1997 B5	SOHO	1.0	0.0512	25.1			1997/01/29	MPC · JPL
C/1997 B6	SOHO	1.0	0.0501	24.95			1997/01/29	MPC · JPL
C/1997 B7	SOHO	1.0	0.049	24.78			1997/01/29	MPC · JPL
C/1997 D1	Mueller	1.001153	2.247625	141.88956	6		1997/10/11	MPC · JPL
C/1997 G7	SOHO	1.0	0.0351	70.33			1997/04/08	MPC · JPL
C/1997 H2	SOHO	1.0	0.1361	18.32			1997/05/03	MPC · JPL
C/1997 H4	SOHO	1.0	0.0356	73.13			1997/04/21	MPC · JPL
C/1997 H5	SOHO	1.0	0.0371	79.18			1997/04/29	MPC · JPL
C/1997 J2	Meunier–Dupouy	1.000564	3.051148	91.273413	6.5		1998/03/10	MPC · JPL
C/1997 K2	—	1.0	1.5463	127.94			1997/06/26	MPC · JPL
C/1997 L2	SOHO	1.0	0.0381	71.69			1997/06/10	MPC · JPL
C/1997 N1	Tabur	1.00016	0.3957	85.964	12.1		1997/08/15	MPC · JPL
C/1997 O2	SOHO	1.0	0.0356	71.92			1997/07/25	MPC · JPL
C/1997 P2	Spacewatch	1.0281	4.263	14.58	10.2		1997/08/31	MPC · JPL
C/1997 S4	SOHO	1.0	0.026	154.63			1997/09/29	MPC · JPL
C/1997 U8	SOHO	1.0	0.031	71.91			1997/10/19	MPC · JPL
C/1997 U9	SOHO	1.0	0.0402	77.41			1997/10/23	MPC · JPL
C/1997 V7	SOHO	1.0	0.0216	137.4			1997/11/03	MPC · JPL
C/1997 V9	SOHO	1.0	0.0611	93.76			1997/11/14	MPC · JPL
C/1997 X7	SOHO	1.0	0.0346	72.62			1997/12/15	MPC · JPL

=== 1998 ===
Comet designation	Name/ discoverer(s)	e	q (AU)	i (°)	Abs. mag (M1)	Nucleus radii	Perihelion date	Ref
C/1998 A2	SOHO	1.0	0.041	27.93			1998/01/03	MPC · JPL
C/1998 A3	SOHO	1.0	0.0419	27.35			1998/01/09	MPC · JPL
C/1998 A4	SOHO	1.0	0.0431	26.87			1998/01/10	MPC · JPL
C/1998 G3	SOHO	1.0	0.0354	53.86			1998/04/12	MPC · JPL
C/1998 G9	SOHO	1.0	0.037	84.26			1998/04/12	MPC · JPL
C/1998 J1	SOHO	1.00019	0.153215	62.9319	6.5		1998/05/08	MPC · JPL
C/1998 M3	Larsen	1.00226	5.7682	113.4217	6.5		1998/07/17	MPC · JPL
C/1998 U1	LINEAR	1.0007	3.9754	156.43	9.5		1998/05/02	MPC · JPL
C/1998 V8	SOHO	1.0	0.0363	72.01			1998/11/03	MPC · JPL
C/1998 V9	SOHO	1.0	0.0072	144.9			1998/11/08	MPC · JPL
C/1998 W3	LINEAR	1.00092	4.91459	129.187	4.9		1998/10/06	MPC · JPL
C/1998 W7	SOHO	1.0	0.0362	72.12			1998/11/28	MPC · JPL

=== 1999 ===
Comet designation	Name/ discoverer(s)	e	q (AU)	i (°)	Abs. mag (M1)	Nucleus radii	Perihelion date	Ref
C/1999 F3	SOHO	1.0	0.0363	73.31			1999/03/17	MPC · JPL
C/1999 H3	LINEAR	1.002965	3.500833	115.83708	8.1		1999/08/18	MPC · JPL
C/1999 J2	Skiff	1.00121	7.10975	86.41294	4.4	4.0 km	2000/04/05	MPC · JPL
C/1999 J4	LINEAR	1.002	3.782	118.92	8.5		1999/11/17	MPC · JPL
C/1999 K5	LINEAR	1.001731	3.255385	89.47266	4.9		2000/07/04	MPC · JPL
C/1999 K8	LINEAR	1.00068	4.200559	52.73433	7.7		2000/04/24	MPC · JPL
C/1999 K16	SOHO	1.0	0.0339	71.73			1999/05/26	MPC · JPL
C/1999 L9	SOHO	1.0	0.038	70.73			1999/06/09	MPC · JPL
C/1999 M3	SOHO	1.0	0.0441	12.35			1999/06/30	MPC · JPL
C/1999 M5	SOHO	1.0	0.0052	142.78			1999/07/01	MPC · JPL
C/1999 N4	LINEAR	1.00426	5.50472	156.92284	6.3		2000/05/23	MPC · JPL
C/1999 N5	SOHO	1.0	0.0496	27.08			1999/07/11	MPC · JPL
C/1999 N6	SOHO	1.0	0.0435	12.15			1999/07/12	MPC · JPL
C/1999 O4	SOHO	1.0	0.0586	133.32			1999/07/18	MPC · JPL
C/1999 P6	SOHO	1.0	0.0494	26.57			1999/08/05	MPC · JPL
C/1999 P7	SOHO	1.0	0.0372	71.32			1999/08/13	MPC · JPL
C/1999 P8	SOHO	1.0	0.0494	26.56			1999/08/14	MPC · JPL
C/1999 P9	SOHO	1.0	0.0493	26.55			1999/08/15	MPC · JPL
C/1999 S2	McNaught–Watson	1.00507	6.468	65.81984	5.7		1999/09/22	MPC · JPL
C/1999 S4 (Note: Comet later disintegrated)	LINEAR	1.000105	0.765093	149.38537	9.4	0.45 km	2000/07/26	MPC · JPL
C/1999 T2	LINEAR	1.002071	3.0374062	111.00197	8.4		2000/11/24	MPC · JPL
C/1999 T3	LINEAR	1.00169	5.3673	104.7665	8.2		2000/08/31	MPC · JPL
C/1999 U1	Ferris	1.00342	4.13908	105.7444	8.2		1998/09/03	MPC · JPL
C/1999 U2	SOHO	1.0	0.049	27			1999/10/25	MPC · JPL
C/1999 U4	Catalina–Skiff	1.007425	4.915568	51.92605	7.6		2001/10/28	MPC · JPL
C/1999 X1	SOHO	1.0	0.0059	148.35			1999/12/04	MPC · JPL
C/1999 Y1	LINEAR	1.000828	3.0913407	134.7911	7.6		2001/03/24	MPC · JPL
C/1999 Y2	SOHO	1.0	0.0483	111.42			1999/12/28	MPC · JPL

== 21st century ==
=== 2000 ===
Comet designation	Name/ discoverer(s)	e	q (AU)	i (°)	Abs. mag (M1)	Nucleus radii	Perihelion date	Ref
C/2000 A1	Montani	1.00419	9.74313	24.5408	4.4		2000/07/13	MPC · JPL
C/2000 B8	SOHO	1.0	0.034	70.75			2000/01/16	MPC · JPL
C/2000 C2	SOHO	1.0	0.037	71.35			2000/02/03	MPC · JPL
C/2000 C3	SOHO	1.0	0.0487	24.97			2000/02/04	MPC · JPL
C/2000 C4	SOHO	1.0	0.0487	24.97			2000/02/05	MPC · JPL
C/2000 C5	SOHO	1.0	0.0358	72.22			2000/02/07	MPC · JPL
C/2000 C7	SOHO	1.0	0.0481	24.89			2000/02/04	MPC · JPL
C/2000 G3	SOHO	1.0	0.0072	133.75			2000/04/11	MPC · JPL
C/2000 H1	LINEAR	1.0022	3.6382	118.2346	10.3		2000/01/29	MPC · JPL
C/2000 J2	SOHO	1.0	0.0335	146.61			2000/05/08	MPC · JPL
C/2000 J8	SOHO	1.0	0.0367	72.5			2000/05/06	MPC · JPL
C/2000 K1	LINEAR	1.00234	6.27586	116.78919	4.8		1999/12/14	MPC · JPL
C/2000 N4	SOHO	1.0	0.0351	74.5			2000/07/04	MPC · JPL
C/2000 O1	Koehn	1.00001	5.92178	148.10417	4.9		2000/01/27	MPC · JPL
C/2000 OF_{8}	Spacewatch	1.00182	2.17279	152.43259	10.3	4.1 km	2001/08/04	MPC · JPL
C/2000 Q1	SOHO	1.0	0.0568	87.14			2000/08/29	MPC · JPL
C/2000 S5	SOHO	1.0	0.6018	53.82			2000/10/26	MPC · JPL
C/2000 SV_{74}	LINEAR	1.004862	3.5418953	75.23668	7.7	14.63 km	2002/04/30	MPC · JPL
C/2000 U5	LINEAR	1.00554	3.48616	93.6511	7.9		2000/03/13	MPC · JPL
C/2000 V4	SOHO	1.0	0.0503	54.97			2000/11/11	MPC · JPL
C/2000 W1	Utsunomiya–Jones	1.000001	0.32118	160.1655	12.6		2000/12/26	MPC · JPL
C/2000 WM1	LINEAR	1.000245	0.5553479	72.55023	9.2	1.7 km	2002/01/22	MPC · JPL
C/2000 X9	SOHO	1.0	0.0386	72.66			2000/12/03	MPC · JPL
C/2000 Y1	Tubbiolo	1.00209	7.97481	137.9725	6.3		2001/02/02	MPC · JPL
C/2000 Y6	SOHO	1.0	0.0252	87.3			2000/12/20	MPC · JPL
C/2000 Y7	SOHO	1.0	0.0245	89.02			2000/12/20	MPC · JPL

=== 2001 ===
Comet designation	Name/ discoverer(s)	e	q (AU)	i (°)	Abs. mag (M1)	Nucleus radii	Perihelion date	Ref
C/2001 B1	LINEAR	1.00118	2.92845	104.1067	9.7		2000/09/19	MPC · JPL
C/2001 B2	NEAT	1.0016	5.30733	150.60199	5.1		2000/09/01	MPC · JPL
C/2001 C5	SOHO	1.0	0.0256	166.26			2001/02/13	MPC · JPL
C/2001 C7	SOHO	1.0	0.035	73.68			2001/02/11	MPC · JPL
C/2001 D1	SOHO	1.0	0.0412	21.34			2004/12/07	MPC · JPL
C/2001 E1	SOHO	1.0	0.0357	73.37			2001/03/15	MPC · JPL
C/2001 F2	SOHO	1.0	0.0049	144.58			2001/03/27	MPC · JPL
C/2001 G1	LONEOS	1.00314	8.23559	45.36021	7.4	4.9 km	2001/10/09	MPC · JPL
C/2001 L10	SOHO	1.0	0.0355	71.7			2001/06/01	MPC · JPL
C/2001 L11	SOHO	1.0	0.005	144.49			2001/06/08	MPC · JPL
C/2001 N1	SOHO	1.0	0.0052	95.09			2001/07/06	MPC · JPL
C/2001 N2	LINEAR	1.001058	2.668517	138.54352	9.2		2002/08/19	MPC · JPL
C/2001 P1	SOHO	1.0	0.0113	29.9			2001/08/05	MPC · JPL
C/2001 Q3	SOHO	1.0	0.0373	106.63			2001/08/26	MPC · JPL
C/2001 Q4	NEAT	1.0006849	0.96195982	99.642736	7.8		2004/05/15	MPC · JPL
C/2001 Q7	SOHO	1.0	0.0445	13.28			2001/08/21	MPC · JPL
C/2001 Q8	SOHO	1.0	0.0451	13.07			2001/08/24	MPC · JPL
C/2001 R7	SOHO	1.0	0.0372	73.77			2001/09/12	MPC · JPL
C/2001 R8	SOHO	1.0	0.0437	13.58			2001/09/06	MPC · JPL
C/2001 R9	SOHO	1.0	0.0472	12.47			2001/09/07	MPC · JPL
C/2001 RX_{14}	LINEAR	1.001606	2.0575616	30.574135	8.5	13.25 km	2003/01/18	MPC · JPL
C/2001 T1	SOHO	1.0	0.0364	72.87			2001/10/09	MPC · JPL
C/2001 T5	SOHO	1.0	0.0476	55.26			2001/10/15	MPC · JPL
C/2001 V6	SOHO	1.0	0.0374	69.76			2001/11/02	MPC · JPL
C/2001 X8	SOHO	1.0	0.0371	72.28			2001/12/12	MPC · JPL
C/2001 X10	SOHO	1.0	0.036	73.46			2001/12/15	MPC · JPL

=== 2002 ===
Comet designation	Name/ discoverer(s)	e	q (AU)	i (°)	Abs. mag (M1)	Nucleus radii	Perihelion date	Ref
C/2002 A3	LINEAR	1.00966	5.15164	48.08962	5		2002/04/24	MPC · JPL
C/2002 A4	SOHO	1.0	0.0366	72.13			2002/01/01	MPC · JPL
C/2002 B3	LINEAR	1.007	6.057	73.694	7.8	18.3 km	2002/01/16	MPC · JPL
C/2002 E2	Snyder–Murakami	1.000793	1.466446	92.54502	10.7		2002/02/21	MPC · JPL
C/2002 G1	SOHO	1.0	0.0339	133.92			2002/04/02	MPC · JPL
C/2002 G3	SOHO	1.0	0.0794	46.89			2002/04/16	MPC · JPL
C/2002 H8	SOHO	1.0	0.0336	69.34			2002/04/20	MPC · JPL
C/2002 J5	LINEAR	1.001087	5.726794	117.2282	5.1	30.3 km	2003/09/19	MPC · JPL
C/2002 N2	SOHO	1.0	0.049	13.8			2002/07/11	MPC · JPL
C/2002 O4	Hönig	1.00079	0.776187	73.1258	13.2		2002/10/01	MPC · JPL
C/2002 O7	LINEAR	1.00028	0.903326	98.7435	9.6	7 km	2003/09/22	MPC · JPL
C/2002 P3	SOHO	1.0	0.0359	73.84			2002/08/12	MPC · JPL
C/2002 Q3	LINEAR	1.0	1.306216	96.8953			2002/08/19	MPC · JPL
C/2002 Q5	LINEAR	1.001571	1.242966	149.16429	13.8		2002/11/19	MPC · JPL
C/2002 Q6	SOHO	1.0	0.0103	65.96			2002/08/23	MPC · JPL
C/2002 Q8	SOHO	1.0	0.0479	13.7			2002/08/25	MPC · JPL
C/2002 Q9	SOHO	1.0	0.0304	22.45			2002/08/19	MPC · JPL
C/2002 Q10	SOHO	1.0	0.0484	13.54			2002/08/27	MPC · JPL
C/2002 R1	SOHO	1.0	0.0492	22.19			2002/09/02	MPC · JPL
C/2002 R3	LONEOS	1.002624	3.869486	161.09525	9.5		2003/06/13	MPC · JPL
C/2002 R4	SOHO	1.0	0.052	28.31			2002/09/03	MPC · JPL
C/2002 R8	SOHO	1.0	0.0343	75.95			2002/09/15	MPC · JPL
C/2002 S4	SOHO	1.0	0.0484	13.51			2002/09/18	MPC · JPL
C/2002 S5	SOHO	1.0	0.0467	14.03			2002/09/19	MPC · JPL
C/2002 S11	SOHO	1.0	0.0482	13.68			2002/09/30	MPC · JPL
C/2002 T2	SOHO	1.0	0.0369	70.94			2002/10/04	MPC · JPL
C/2002 T7	LINEAR	1.0004911	0.6145476	160.58277	6.6	52 km	2004/04/23	MPC · JPL
C/2002 U2	LINEAR	1.000039	1.2086305	59.135658	14.2		2002/12/31	MPC · JPL
C/2002 U4	SOHO	1.0	0.0051	144.67			2002/10/23	MPC · JPL
C/2002 U5	SOHO	1.0	0.005	144.31			2002/10/28	MPC · JPL
C/2002 U6	SOHO	1.0	0.0359	73.06			2002/10/28	MPC · JPL
C/2002 U7	SOHO	1.0	0.0051	145.16			2002/10/31	MPC · JPL
C/2002 U8	SOHO	1.0	0.0051	143.97			2002/10/31	MPC · JPL
C/2002 U9	SOHO	1.0	0.005	144.17			2002/10/31	MPC · JPL
C/2002 V3	SOHO	1.0	0.0051	144.48			2002/11/09	MPC · JPL
C/2002 V4	SOHO	1.0	0.0357	72.5			2002/11/09	MPC · JPL
C/2002 V5	SOHO	1.0	0.0506	34.24			2002/11/12	MPC · JPL
C/2002 V6	SOHO	1.0	0.0077	138.73			2002/11/13	MPC · JPL
C/2002 V7	SOHO	1.0	0.0052	143.67			2002/11/16	MPC · JPL
C/2002 W1	SOHO	1.0	0.0069	138.86			2002/11/16	MPC · JPL
C/2002 W2	SOHO	1.0	0.0072	144.15			2002/11/18	MPC · JPL
C/2002 W3	SOHO	1.0	0.0051	142.31			2002/11/19	MPC · JPL
C/2002 W4	SOHO	1.0	0.0051	144.06			2002/11/19	MPC · JPL
C/2002 W5	SOHO	1.0	0.0049	143.67			2002/11/20	MPC · JPL
C/2002 W6	SOHO	1.0	0.0051	141.93			2002/11/20	MPC · JPL
C/2002 W7	SOHO	1.0	0.0076	139.69			2002/11/22	MPC · JPL
C/2002 W8	SOHO	1.0	0.0073	139.37			2002/11/23	MPC · JPL
C/2002 W9	SOHO	1.0	0.0051	144.03			2002/11/23	MPC · JPL
C/2002 W10	SOHO	1.0	0.0055	141.11			2002/11/24	MPC · JPL
C/2002 W11	SOHO	1.0	0.0053	143.17			2002/11/25	MPC · JPL
C/2002 W12	SOHO	1.0	0.0049	144.49			2002/11/28	MPC · JPL
C/2002 W13	SOHO	1.0	0.005	143.49			2002/11/28	MPC · JPL
C/2002 W14	SOHO	1.0	0.005	143.16			2002/11/29	MPC · JPL
C/2002 W15	SOHO	1.0	0.007	145.16			2002/11/29	MPC · JPL
C/2002 W16	SOHO	1.0	0.0085	136.41			2002/11/29	MPC · JPL
C/2002 W17	SOHO	1.0	0.0056	138.52			2002/11/29	MPC · JPL
C/2002 X3	SOHO	1.0	0.0051	141.67			2002/12/04	MPC · JPL
C/2002 X4	SOHO	1.0	0.0052	141.31			2002/12/04	MPC · JPL
C/2002 X6	SOHO	1.0	0.0346	72.55			2002/12/02	MPC · JPL
C/2002 X7	SOHO	1.0	0.0052	137.42			2002/12/01	MPC · JPL
C/2002 X8	SOHO	1.0	0.0049	142.08			2002/12/05	MPC · JPL
C/2002 X9	SOHO	1.0	0.0082	139.82			2002/12/05	MPC · JPL
C/2002 X10	SOHO	1.0	0.005	143.16			2002/12/05	MPC · JPL
C/2002 X11	SOHO	1.0	0.005	143.4			2002/12/09	MPC · JPL
C/2002 X12	SOHO	1.0	0.0051	139.96			2002/12/10	MPC · JPL
C/2002 X13	SOHO	1.0	0.005	137.25			2002/12/03	MPC · JPL
C/2002 X14	SOHO	1.0	0.0042	144.59			2002/12/12	MPC · JPL
C/2002 X15	SOHO	1.0	0.0048	133.28			2002/12/14	MPC · JPL
C/2002 X16	SOHO	1.0	0.0051	145.02			2002/12/11	MPC · JPL
C/2002 Y2	SOHO	1.0	0.04	73.52			2002/12/19	MPC · JPL
C/2002 Y3	SOHO	1.0	0.0049	146.92			2002/12/18	MPC · JPL
C/2002 Y4	SOHO	1.0	0.0055	147.76			2002/12/26	MPC · JPL

=== 2003 ===
Comet designation	Name/ discoverer(s)	e	q (AU)	i (°)	Abs. mag (M1)	Nucleus radii	Perihelion date	Ref
C/2003 A2	Gleason	1.00695	11.42731	8.06156	7.1	4.0 km	2003/11/04	MPC · JPL
C/2003 A3	SOHO	1.0	0.0055	140.05			2003/01/07	MPC · JPL
C/2003 A4	SOHO	1.0	0.0071	144.57			2003/01/16	MPC · JPL
C/2003 A5	SOHO	1.0	0.0048	144.84			2003/01/16	MPC · JPL
C/2003 B1	SOHO	1.0	0.0355	73.36			2003/01/17	MPC · JPL
C/2003 B2	SOHO	1.0	0.0049	144.97			2003/01/19	MPC · JPL
C/2003 C1	SOHO	1.0	0.0049	140.05			2003/02/04	MPC · JPL
C/2003 C2	SOHO	1.0	0.0047	144.47			2003/02/09	MPC · JPL
C/2003 C3	SOHO	1.0	0.005	142.05			2003/02/11	MPC · JPL
C/2003 C4	SOHO	1.0	0.0051	145.05			2003/02/14	MPC · JPL
C/2003 C5	SOHO	1.0	0.0049	144.42			2003/02/17	MPC · JPL
C/2003 D1	SOHO	1.0	0.0052	144.7			2003/03/01	MPC · JPL
C/2003 E2	SOHO	1.0	0.0049	144.06			2003/03/04	MPC · JPL
C/2003 E3	SOHO	1.0	0.0051	145.29			2003/03/12	MPC · JPL
C/2003 E4	SOHO	1.0	0.005	144.66			2003/03/16	MPC · JPL
C/2003 F3	SOHO	1.0	0.0049	144.59			2003/03/21	MPC · JPL
C/2003 F4	SOHO	1.0	0.0051	145.06			2003/03/25	MPC · JPL
C/2003 F5	SOHO	1.0	0.0049	144.55			2003/03/30	MPC · JPL
C/2003 G1	LINEAR	1.001377	4.916285	66.8495	5.3		2003/02/03	MPC · JPL
C/2003 G3	SOHO	1.0	0.0168	169.7			2003/04/05	MPC · JPL
C/2003 G4	SOHO	1.0	0.005	147.49			2003/04/02	MPC · JPL
C/2003 H5	SOHO	1.0	0.0351	71.35			2003/04/27	MPC · JPL
C/2003 H6	SOHO	1.0	0.0264	27.05			2003/04/30	MPC · JPL
C/2003 H7	SOHO	1.0	0.0266	27.9			2003/04/30	MPC · JPL
C/2003 H8	SOHO	1.0	0.005	144.12			2003/04/23	MPC · JPL
C/2003 H9	SOHO	1.0	0.0048	143.76			2003/04/25	MPC · JPL
C/2003 H10	SOHO	1.0	0.005	143.83			2003/04/29	MPC · JPL
C/2003 H11	SOHO	1.0	0.0051	137.2			2003/04/29	MPC · JPL
C/2003 H12	SOHO	1.0	0.0051	144.35			2003/05/01	MPC · JPL
C/2003 J2	SOHO	1.0	0.0051	143.39			2003/05/01	MPC · JPL
C/2003 J3	SOHO	1.0	0.005	142.82			2003/05/06	MPC · JPL
C/2003 J4	SOHO	1.0	0.005	144.58			2003/05/06	MPC · JPL
C/2003 J5	SOHO	1.0	0.0051	143.94			2003/05/08	MPC · JPL
C/2003 J6	SOHO	1.0	0.0055	143.08			2003/05/10	MPC · JPL
C/2003 J7	SOHO	1.0	0.0074	141.86			2003/05/15	MPC · JPL
C/2003 J8	SOHO	1.0	0.005	144.29			2003/05/16	MPC · JPL
C/2003 J9	SOHO	1.0	0.005	144.18			2003/05/16	MPC · JPL
C/2003 K3	SOHO	1.0	0.13918	39.529			2003/06/01	MPC · JPL
C/2003 K4	LINEAR	1.000301	1.0236107	134.252523	6.8	9.745 km	2004/10/13	MPC · JPL
C/2003 K5	SOHO	1.0	0.0348	72.5			2003/05/21	MPC · JPL
C/2003 K6	SOHO	1.0	0.0372	71.87			2003/05/30	MPC · JPL
C/2003 K7	SOHO	1.0	0.0051	144.15			2003/05/24	MPC · JPL
C/2003 K8	SOHO	1.0	0.0076	135.87			2003/05/22	MPC · JPL
C/2003 K9	SOHO	1.0	0.0041	144.48			2003/05/24	MPC · JPL
C/2003 K10	SOHO	1.0	0.005	144.2			2003/05/27	MPC · JPL
C/2003 K11	SOHO	1.0	0.005	141.58			2003/05/27	MPC · JPL
C/2003 K12	SOHO	1.0	0.0091	136.8			2003/05/29	MPC · JPL
C/2003 K13	SOHO	1.0	0.0057	148.89			2003/05/24	MPC · JPL
C/2003 L3	SOHO	1.0	0.005	142.65			2003/06/02	MPC · JPL
C/2003 L4	SOHO	1.0	0.005	141.93			2003/06/06	MPC · JPL
C/2003 L5	SOHO	1.0	0.005	144.23			2003/06/10	MPC · JPL
C/2003 L6	SOHO	1.0	0.005	135.18			2003/06/10	MPC · JPL
C/2003 L7	SOHO	1.0	0.0057	133.71			2003/06/14	MPC · JPL
C/2003 L8	SOHO	1.0	0.0048	141.6			2003/06/16	MPC · JPL
C/2003 M1	SOHO	1.0	0.0044	144.57			2003/06/16	MPC · JPL
C/2003 M2	SOHO	1.0	0.0043	143.54			2003/06/18	MPC · JPL
C/2003 M3	SOHO	1.0	0.0044	141.43			2003/06/18	MPC · JPL
C/2003 M4	SOHO	1.0	0.0068	141.94			2003/06/18	MPC · JPL
C/2003 M5	SOHO	1.0	0.007	139.29			2003/06/19	MPC · JPL
C/2003 M6	SOHO	1.0	0.0066	143.2			2003/06/20	MPC · JPL
C/2003 M7	SOHO	1.0	0.005	145.25			2003/06/20	MPC · JPL
C/2003 M8	SOHO	1.0	0.0054	147.58			2003/06/22	MPC · JPL
C/2003 M9	SOHO	1.0	0.0053	146.97			2003/06/23	MPC · JPL
C/2003 M10	SOHO	1.0	0.0058	148.86			2003/06/23	MPC · JPL
C/2003 M11	SOHO	1.0	0.0052	145.69			2003/06/23	MPC · JPL
C/2003 M12	SOHO	1.0	0.0048	143.12			2003/06/23	MPC · JPL
C/2003 N1	SOHO	1.0	0.0049	144.79			2003/07/06	MPC · JPL
C/2003 N2	SOHO	1.0	0.0048	146.13			2003/07/13	MPC · JPL
C/2003 O1	LINEAR	1.00135	6.84738	117.98167	8.2	1.0 km	2004/05/17	MPC · JPL
C/2003 O4	SOHO	1.0	0.0053	134.3			2003/07/19	MPC · JPL
C/2003 O5	SOHO	1.0	0.0067	139.42			2003/07/21	MPC · JPL
C/2003 O6	SOHO	1.0	0.005	144.55			2003/07/25	MPC · JPL
C/2003 O7	SOHO	1.0	0.0051	144.99			2003/07/26	MPC · JPL
C/2003 O8	SOHO	1.0	0.0052	145.34			2003/07/30	MPC · JPL
C/2003 P1	SOHO	1.0	0.0054	145.12			2003/08/03	MPC · JPL
C/2003 P2	SOHO	1.0	0.0053	139.66			2003/08/04	MPC · JPL
C/2003 P3	SOHO	1.0	0.005	144.43			2003/08/06	MPC · JPL
C/2003 Q1	SOHO	1.0	0.032	29.33			2003/08/20	MPC · JPL
C/2003 Q2	SOHO	1.0	0.0049	144.57			2003/08/25	MPC · JPL
C/2003 Q3	SOHO	1.0	0.0053	144.84			2003/08/24	MPC · JPL
C/2003 Q4	SOHO	1.0	0.0051	144.43			2003/08/25	MPC · JPL
C/2003 Q5	SOHO	1.0	0.005	144.7			2003/08/27	MPC · JPL
C/2003 R4	SOHO	1.0	0.0316	92.36			2003/09/06	MPC · JPL
C/2003 S3	LINEAR	1.00152	8.12944	151.49626	5.1		2003/04/10	MPC · JPL
C/2003 S9	SOHO	1.0	0.0154	28.79			2003/09/25	MPC · JPL
C/2003 T4	LINEAR	1.00048	0.84974	86.76125	9.1		2005/04/03	MPC · JPL
C/2003 U4	SOHO	1.0	0.0357	74.94			2003/10/21	MPC · JPL
C/2003 W2	SOHO	1.0	0.0314	73.26			2003/11/29	MPC · JPL
C/2003 WT_{42}	LINEAR	1.002586	5.190923	31.410594	5	48.7 km	2006/04/10	MPC · JPL
C/2003 Y1	SOHO	1.0	0.0354	72.81			2003/12/20	MPC · JPL

=== 2004 ===
Comet designation	Name/ discoverer(s)	e	q (AU)	i (°)	Abs. mag (M1)	Nucleus radii	Perihelion date	Ref
C/2004 A3	SOHO	1.0	0.0433	14.75			2004/01/16	MPC · JPL
C/2004 B1	LINEAR	1.0013096	1.6019487	114.09719	10.4		2004/02/07	MPC · JPL
C/2004 B2	SOHO	1.0	0.0353	73.1			2004/01/29	MPC · JPL
C/2004 B3	SOHO	1.0	0.0515	13.28			2004/01/18	MPC · JPL
C/2004 C2	SOHO	1.0	0.0325	72.92			2004/02/05	MPC · JPL
C/2004 D1	NEAT	1.001628	4.97459	45.53744	8.5	21.4 km	2004/02/10	MPC · JPL
C/2004 G2	SOHO	1.0	0.0383	72.62			2004/04/10	MPC · JPL
C/2004 G7	SOHO	1.0	0.0051	144.19			2004/04/14	MPC · JPL
C/2004 G8	SOHO	1.0	0.005	144.42			2004/04/14	MPC · JPL
C/2004 G9	SOHO	1.0	0.0052	144.22			2004/04/16	MPC · JPL
C/2004 H1	LINEAR	1.0	2.078	140.71	15.4		2004/01/15	MPC · JPL
C/2004 H4	SOHO	1.0	0.0343	67.87			2004/04/16	MPC · JPL
C/2004 H5	SOHO	1.0	0.0335	68.62			2004/04/30	MPC · JPL
C/2004 H6	SWAN	1.00063	0.77629	107.6639	10.9		2004/05/12	MPC · JPL
C/2004 H7	SOHO	1.0	0.0052	144.22			2004/04/19	MPC · JPL
C/2004 H8	SOHO	1.0	0.0049	145.03			2004/04/19	MPC · JPL
C/2004 H9	SOHO	1.0	0.0051	146.39			2004/04/19	MPC · JPL
C/2004 J4	SOHO	1.0	0.0417	12.35			2004/05/05	MPC · JPL
C/2004 J12	SOHO	1.0	0.0398	12.68			2004/05/12	MPC · JPL
C/2004 J13	SOHO	1.0	0.0441	12.47			2004/05/13	MPC · JPL
C/2004 J15	SOHO	1.0	0.0438	12.28			2004/05/14	MPC · JPL
C/2004 J16	SOHO	1.0	0.0314	14.63			2004/05/14	MPC · JPL
C/2004 J17	SOHO	1.0	0.0356	13.79			2004/05/15	MPC · JPL
C/2004 J18	SOHO	1.0	0.0461	11.89			2004/05/15	MPC · JPL
C/2004 J20	SOHO	1.0	0.0419	12.76			2004/05/13	MPC · JPL
C/2004 L10	SOHO	1.0	0.0431	12.54			2004/06/14	MPC · JPL
C/2004 R2	ASAS	1.0	0.11283	63.174	10		2004/10/07	MPC · JPL
C/2004 S1	Van Ness	1.0	0.6817	144.67	16		2004/12/08	MPC · JPL
C/2004 S2	SOHO	1.0	0.0053	144.91			2004/09/21	MPC · JPL
C/2004 S3	SOHO	1.0	0.0069	144.8			2004/09/23	MPC · JPL
C/2004 T2	SOHO	1.0	0.0346	73.67			2004/10/09	MPC · JPL
C/2004 U2	SOHO	1.0	0.0659	84.25			2004/10/18	MPC · JPL
C/2004 U3	SOHO	1.0	0.0375	73.25			2004/10/18	MPC · JPL
C/2004 V10	SOHO	1.0	0.0488	26.4			2004/11/08	MPC · JPL
C/2004 V13	SWAN	1.0	0.18086	34.81	15		2004/12/21	MPC · JPL
C/2004 W10	SOHO	1.0	0.0467	25.97			2004/11/29	MPC · JPL
C/2004 X3	LINEAR	1.00644	4.402303	81.0786	5.6		2005/06/17	MPC · JPL
C/2004 Y4	SOHO	1.0	0.0896	94.42			2004/12/25	MPC · JPL
C/2004 Y10	SOHO	1.0	0.0322	131.61			2004/12/28	MPC · JPL

=== 2005 ===
Comet designation	Name/ discoverer(s)	e	q (AU)	i (°)	Abs. mag (M1)	Nucleus radii	Perihelion date	Ref
C/2005 A1-A	LINEAR	1.000647	0.9067022	74.88073	9.5		2005/04/10	MPC · JPL
C/2005 B1	Christensen	1.0002	3.205	92.55117	8.6		2006/02/23	MPC · JPL
C/2005 B4	SOHO	1.0	0.0353	71.69			2005/01/30	MPC · JPL
C/2005 C1	SOHO	1.0	0.0392	67.47			2005/02/02	MPC · JPL
C/2005 C4	SOHO	1.0	0.0391	40.06			2005/02/13	MPC · JPL
C/2005 D1	SOHO	1.0	0.0468	121.76			2005/02/23	MPC · JPL
C/2005 E2	McNaught	1.00014	1.5195705	16.98831	9.4		2005/02/23	MPC · JPL
C/2005 E4	SOHO	1.0	0.0487	26.43			2005/03/10	MPC · JPL
C/2005 EL_{173}	LONEOS	1.003184	3.886323	130.67667	7.9	17.9 km	2005/03/05	MPC · JPL
C/2005 G2	SOHO	1.0	0.0492	26.84			2005/04/14	MPC · JPL
C/2005 H2	SOHO	1.0	0.0362	78.83			2005/04/17	MPC · JPL
C/2005 H7	SOHO	1.0	0.0127	73.07			2005/04/25	MPC · JPL
C/2005 H9	SOHO	1.0	0.0352	73.54			2005/04/29	MPC · JPL
C/2005 J2	Catalina	1.0	4.2873	150.803	9		2005/04/04	MPC · JPL
C/2005 K1	Skiff	1.003292	3.692911	77.74757	6.6		2005/11/21	MPC · JPL
C/2005 K2	LINEAR	1.0	0.82	90	19		2005/06/15	MPC · JPL
C/2005 K2-A	LINEAR	1.0	0.54459	102.045	14		2005/07/05	MPC · JPL
C/2005 K4	SOHO	1.0	0.0373	73.25			2005/05/16	MPC · JPL
C/2005 K9	SOHO	1.0	0.0354	73.06			2005/05/28	MPC · JPL
C/2005 L2	McNaught	1.0	3.1939	152.7638	11		2005/07/14	MPC · JPL
C/2005 M3	SOHO	1.0	0.0355	88.99			2005/06/19	MPC · JPL
C/2005 O5	SOHO	1.0	0.0361	74.41			2005/07/26	MPC · JPL
C/2005 Q1	LINEAR	1.00432	6.40838	105.19199	8.4		2005/08/25	MPC · JPL
C/2005 Q2	SOHO	1.0	0.0377	74.51			2005/08/23	MPC · JPL
C/2005 Q3	SOHO	1.0	0.0253	43.52			2005/08/30	MPC · JPL
C/2005 Q4	SOHO	1.0	0.0048	144.55			2005/08/18	MPC · JPL
C/2005 Q6	SOHO	1.0	0.0387	50.4			2005/08/19	MPC · JPL
C/2005 Q8	SOHO	1.0	0.0377	72.42			2005/08/25	MPC · JPL
C/2005 T9	SOHO	1.0	0.0368	72.51			2005/10/08	MPC · JPL
C/2005 T12	SOHO	1.0	0.0055	143.98			2005/10/18	MPC · JPL
C/2005 V8	SOHO	1.0	0.0266	75.64			2005/11/09	MPC · JPL
C/2005 W1	SOHO	1.0	0.0483	24.9			2005/11/17	MPC · JPL
C/2005 W5	SOHO	1.0	0.0494	26.91			2005/11/29	MPC · JPL
C/2005 W9	SOHO	1.0	0.037	72.63			2005/11/19	MPC · JPL
C/2005 W11	SOHO	1.0	0.0396	76.08			2005/11/20	MPC · JPL
C/2005 Y1	SOHO	1.0	0.0983	173.01			2005/12/19	MPC · JPL
C/2005 Y8	SOHO	1.0	0.0338	73.75			2005/12/25	MPC · JPL

=== 2006 ===
Comet designation	Name/ discoverer(s)	e	q (AU)	i (°)	Abs. mag (M1)	Nucleus radii	Perihelion date	Ref
C/2006 B4	SOHO	1.0	0.0345	73.15			2006/01/26	MPC · JPL
C/2006 E1	McNaught	1.00112	6.04061	83.19421	7.7		2007/01/06	MPC · JPL
C/2006 E2	SOHO	1.0	0.0482	24.5			2006/03/15	MPC · JPL
C/2006 F3	SOHO	1.0	0.051	23.02			2006/03/25	MPC · JPL
C/2006 F6	SOHO	1.0	0.0333	74.13			2006/03/23	MPC · JPL
C/2006 GZ_{2}	Spacewatch	1.0	3.3	168.68	12.9		2006/08/21	MPC · JPL
C/2006 HW_{51}	Siding Spring	1.00211	2.265606	45.80978	11.2	7.7 km	2006/09/29	MPC · JPL
C/2006 J5	SOHO	1.0	0.0387	72.12			2006/05/08	MPC · JPL
C/2006 K1	McNaught	1.001603	4.425527	53.87673	8.2		2007/07/20	MPC · JPL
C/2006 K3	McNaught	1.000791	2.501449	92.62001	9.7		2007/03/13	MPC · JPL
C/2006 K5	SOHO	1.0	0.0512	117.6			2006/05/23	MPC · JPL
C/2006 L2	McNaught	1.001013	1.993947	101.02231	10.5		2006/11/20	MPC · JPL
C/2006 M2	Spacewatch	1.0	5.3	150	14.1		2006/01/01	MPC · JPL
C/2006 M4	SWAN	1.000185	0.7830083	111.82327	10.5		2006/09/28	MPC · JPL
C/2006 M9	SOHO	1.0	0.0049	144.81			2006/06/27	MPC · JPL
C/2006 OF_{2}	Broughton	1.0007839	2.4314416	30.170425	8.2	6.27 km	2008/09/15	MPC · JPL
C/2006 P1	McNaught	1.0000191	0.1707364	77.83699	9.5		2007/01/12	MPC · JPL
C/2006 R3	SOHO	1.0	0.0337	75.14			2006/09/02	MPC · JPL
C/2006 S2	LINEAR	1.00196	3.161509	98.95914	10.9		2007/05/27	MPC · JPL
C/2006 S3	LONEOS	1.00002	5.13510	166.02458	6.3	14.54 km	2012/04/13	MPC · JPL
C/2006 U10	SOHO	1.0	0.0346	71.68			2006/10/20	MPC · JPL
C/2006 VZ_{13}	LINEAR	1.000246	1.0152521	134.79332	13.1	6.1 km	2007/08/10	MPC · JPL
C/2006 X1	LINEAR	1.0	6.126	42.618	6.9		2006/03/05	MPC · JPL
C/2006 X10	SOHO	1.0	0.0348	72.63			2006/12/15	MPC · JPL
C/2006 Y12	SOHO	1.0	0.0049	146.32			2006/12/28	MPC · JPL
C/2006 YC	Catalina–Christensen	1.00017	4.9482	69.564	8.9		2006/09/11	MPC · JPL

=== 2007 ===
Comet designation	Name/ discoverer(s)	e	q (AU)	i (°)	Abs. mag (M1)	Nucleus radii	Perihelion date	Ref
C/2007 A6	SOHO	1.0	0.0382	70.57			2007/01/11	MPC · JPL
C/2007 A7	SOHO	1.0	0.0191	144.23			2007/01/10	MPC · JPL
C/2007 C7	SOHO	1.0	0.0172	70.99			2007/02/02	MPC · JPL
C/2007 C10	SOHO	1.0	0.0351	72.77			2007/02/07	MPC · JPL
C/2007 C12	SOHO	1.0	0.0408	122.22			2007/02/09	MPC · JPL
C/2007 F1	LONEOS	1.000086	0.402374	116.0821	10.8	0.75 km	2007/10/28	MPC · JPL
C/2007 F4	SOHO	1.0	0.0347	71.41			2007/03/28	MPC · JPL
C/2007 G1	LINEAR	1.001484	2.6461824	88.3587	8.5	5.25 km	2008/11/16	MPC · JPL
C/2007 J1	SOHO	1.0	0.0348	72.59			2007/05/02	MPC · JPL
C/2007 JA_{21}	LINEAR	1.00177	5.36857	89.84038	9.2		2006/11/14	MPC · JPL
C/2007 K3	Siding Spring	1.00124	2.050736	16.30058	13.7		2008/04/21	MPC · JPL
C/2007 K4	Gibbs	1.0029	3.5278	98.626	11.9		2007/05/03	MPC · JPL
C/2007 K12	SOHO	1.0	0.0346	72.52			2007/05/18	MPC · JPL
C/2007 M5	SOHO	1.0	0.0011	154.15			2007/06/25	MPC · JPL
C/2007 M8	SOHO	1.0	0.0478	82.04			2007/06/25	MPC · JPL
C/2007 O1	LINEAR	1.00483	2.87671	24.38138	10.8	8.1 km	2007/06/03	MPC · JPL
C/2007 P1	McNaught	1.0	0.52	119.2	13.6		2007/04/03	MPC · JPL
C/2007 Q1	Garradd	1.0	2.99	82	10.7		2006/12/11	MPC · JPL
C/2007 Q3	Siding Spring	1.0002382	2.2516894	65.650492	7.2	9.15 km	2009/10/17	MPC · JPL
C/2007 R10	SOHO	1.0	0.037	75.8			2007/09/15	MPC · JPL
C/2007 S11	SOHO	1.0	0.0563	116.94			2007/09/28	MPC · JPL
C/2007 U1	LINEAR	1.001428	3.329202	157.78664	10		2008/08/07	MPC · JPL
C/2007 U7	SOHO	1.0	0.0325	73.43			2007/10/27	MPC · JPL
C/2007 V10	SOHO	1.0	0.035	76.95			2007/11/09	MPC · JPL
C/2007 W1	Boattini	1.000192	0.8497119	9.88987	12	0.65 km	2008/06/24	MPC · JPL
C/2007 W3	LINEAR	1.000165	1.776638	78.67357	12.4		2008/06/02	MPC · JPL
C/2007 X1	SOHO	1.0	0.0272	129.2			2007/12/03	MPC · JPL
C/2007 X7	SOHO	1.0	0.0378	71.98			2007/12/10	MPC · JPL
C/2007 X14	SOHO	1.0	0.0345	72.47			2007/12/14	MPC · JPL
C/2007 Y1	LINEAR	1.00074	3.34091	110.1787	10.6		2008/03/19	MPC · JPL
C/2007 Y4	SOHO	1.0	0.0505	28.59			2007/12/22	MPC · JPL
C/2007 Y8	SOHO	1.0	0.0344	72.77			2007/12/28	MPC · JPL

=== 2008 ===
Comet designation	Name/ discoverer(s)	e	q (AU)	i (°)	Abs. mag (M1)	Nucleus radii	Perihelion date	Ref
C/2008 A1	McNaught	1.000527	1.0731438	82.54905	8.1	3.95 km	2008/09/29	MPC · JPL
C/2008 A3	SOHO	1.0	0.0493	22.28			2008/01/15	MPC · JPL
C/2008 C3	SOHO	1.0	0.0346	158.24			2008/02/03	MPC · JPL
C/2008 C9	SOHO	1.0	0.0627	74.32			2008/02/15	MPC · JPL
C/2008 D1	STEREO	1.0	0.0052	140.28			2008/02/17	MPC · JPL
C/2008 D2	STEREO	1.0	0.0051	143.49			2008/02/20	MPC · JPL
C/2008 D3	STEREO	1.0	0.00528	143.994			2008/02/22	MPC · JPL
C/2008 D4	STEREO	1.0	0.0049	145.98			2008/02/21	MPC · JPL
C/2008 D6	SOHO	1.0	0.0338	70.85			2008/02/19	MPC · JPL
C/2008 E4	SOHO	1.0	0.0499	13.13			2008/03/03	MPC · JPL
C/2008 E5	STEREO	1.0	0.0051	144.84			2008/03/06	MPC · JPL
C/2008 E6	STEREO	1.0	0.0051	143.75			2008/03/16	MPC · JPL
C/2008 E7	SOHO	1.0	0.0548	143.28			2008/03/05	MPC · JPL
C/2008 F1	SOHO	1.0	0.0318	66.71			2008/03/20	MPC · JPL
C/2008 FK_{75}	Lemmon–Siding Spring	1.002701	4.5108942	61.175529	7.7	7.35 km	2010/09/29	MPC · JPL
C/2008 G6	SOHO	1.0	0.0483	14.35			2008/04/13	MPC · JPL
C/2008 H4	SOHO	1.0	0.0373	73.46			2008/04/18	MPC · JPL
C/2008 J4	McNaught	1.028	0.4528	87.37	16.5		2008/06/19	MPC · JPL
C/2008 J6	Hill	1.002136	2.0035	44.988	10.7		2008/04/10	MPC · JPL
C/2008 J10	SOHO	1.0	0.0369	72.18			2008/05/07	MPC · JPL
C/2008 J12	SOHO	1.0	0.0379	70.94			2008/05/08	MPC · JPL
C/2008 P1	Garradd	1.001679	3.896111	64.31032	8.9		2009/07/22	MPC · JPL
C/2008 S3	Boattini	1.001082	8.017962	162.70226	7.4	11.705 km	2011/06/06	MPC · JPL
C/2008 T2	Cardinal	1.000109	1.202207	56.30368	9.1	1.865 km	2009/06/13	MPC · JPL

=== 2009 ===
Comet designation	Name/ discoverer(s)	e	q (AU)	i (°)	Abs. mag (M1)	Nucleus radii	Perihelion date	Ref
C/2009 F4	McNaught	1.002015	5.454893	79.34683	4.1	22.3 km	2011/12/31	MPC · JPL
C/2009 G1	STEREO	1.0	1.12933	108.3156	8.6	2.05 km	2009/04/16	MPC · JPL
C/2009 K3	Beshore	1.0	3	140	9		2011	MPC · JPL
C/2009 K5	McNaught	1.0008394	1.4224011	103.8794	11.1	13.88 km	2010/04/30	MPC · JPL
C/2009 O4	Hill	1.00134	2.5638	95.8234	4.9		2010/01/01	MPC · JPL
C/2009 P1	Garradd	1.0002468	1.5512607	106.168144	7.2	2.5 km	2011/12/23	MPC · JPL
C/2009 P2	Boattini	1.00152	6.54398	163.45285	8.5		2010/02/10	MPC · JPL
C/2009 R1	McNaught	1.000407	0.405084	77.03084	9.8	4.415 km	2010/07/02	MPC · JPL
C/2009 S3	Lemmon	1.00142	6.474515	60.38463	8.7		2011/12/11	MPC · JPL
C/2009 U1	Garradd	1.0	5	90	7.8		2008	MPC · JPL
C/2009 UG_{89}	Lemmon	1.00796	3.931171	130.09983	5	5.62 km	2010/12/16	MPC · JPL

=== 2010 ===
Comet designation	Name/ discoverer(s)	e	q (AU)	i (°)	Abs. mag (M1)	Nucleus radii	Perihelion date	Ref
C/2010 E3	WISE	1.0	2.27	96.5	15.1	0.865 km	2010/04/04	MPC · JPL
C/2010 F4	Machholz	1.0	0.61382	89.146	13.9		2010/04/06	MPC · JPL
C/2010 J4	WISE	1.0	1.0855	162.3	19.6	0.28 km	2010/05/03	MPC · JPL
C/2010 M1	Gibbs	1.0	2.0545	69.965	9.3		2011/12/24	MPC · JPL
C/2010 R1	LINEAR	1.003664	5.621416	156.93337	5		2012/05/18	MPC · JPL
C/2010 S1	LINEAR	1.001128	5.899923	125.33521	4.7	5.438 km	2013/05/20	MPC · JPL
C/2010 U3	Boattini	1.00328	8.45123	55.47490	5.9	0.1 km	2019/02/23	MPC · JPL
C/2010 X1	Elenin	1.000063	0.48244	1.8395	10.4	0.3 km	2011/09/10	MPC · JPL

=== 2011 ===
Comet designation	Name/ discoverer(s)	e	q (AU)	i (°)	Abs. mag (M1)	Nucleus radii	Perihelion date	Ref
C/2011 G1	McNaught	1.001002	2.1551422	162.23349	11.5		2011/09/16	MPC · JPL
C/2011 J2	LINEAR	1.0005048	3.4434463	122.798829	7.3	1.298 km	2013/12/25	MPC · JPL
C/2011 J2-B	LINEAR	1.00047	3.440	122.79	9.5		2013/12/24	MPC · JPL
C/2011 J2-C	LINEAR	1.000	3.4414	122.794	13.8		2013/12/25	MPC · JPL
C/2011 K1	Schwartz–Holvorcem	1.005	3.376	122.61	11.7		2011/04/21	MPC · JPL
C/2011 L2	McNaught	1.00177	1.94345	104.25745	11.8		2011/11/01	MPC · JPL
C/2011 L3	McNaught	1.0001	1.923845	87.1144	11.8		2011/08/10	MPC · JPL
C/2011 L4	PanSTARRS	1.0000326	0.3015445	84.20819	7.5	2.317 km	2013/03/10	MPC · JPL
C/2011 L6	Boattini	1.0037	6.7876	171.4563	10.2		2011/01/22	MPC · JPL
C/2011 M1	LINEAR	1.0028	0.8958	70.1837	12.4		2011/09/07	MPC · JPL
C/2011 N3	SOHO	1.00027	0.00053	144.44		0.005–0.025 km	2011/07/06	MPC · JPL
C/2011 Q2	McNaught	1.00007	1.349561	36.8666	4.7		2012/01/19	MPC · JPL
C/2011 R1	McNaught	1.000744	2.0795709	116.1968	8.2		2012/10/19	MPC · JPL
C/2011 U3	PanSTARRS	1.0004	1.0714	116.775	12.1		2012/06/03	MPC · JPL
C/2011 UF_{305}	LINEAR	1.000675	2.1382121	93.96074	6.4		2012/07/22	MPC · JPL

=== 2012 ===
Comet designation	Name/ discoverer(s)	e	q (AU)	i (°)	Abs. mag (M1)	Nucleus radii	Perihelion date	Ref
C/2012 A1	PanSTARRS	1.00102	7.60503	120.89955	8.4		2013/11/29	MPC · JPL
C/2012 B3	La Sagra	1.00118	3.53654	106.93294	10.3		2011/12/06	MPC · JPL
C/2012 C2	Bruenjes	1.0034	0.8024	162.79	16.7		2012/03/12	MPC · JPL
C/2012 E2	SWAN	1.000	0.007	144.2		0.04–0.34 km	2012/03/15	MPC · JPL
C/2012 F3	PanSTARRS	1.001524	3.456860	11.35451	7.8	31.36 km	2015/04/06	MPC · JPL
C/2012 J1	Catalina	1.001327	3.158711	34.18609	5.5	3.3 km	2012/12/07	MPC · JPL
C/2012 K1	PanSTARRS	1.0001519	1.0545929	142.428259	7.2	1.7 km	2014/08/27	MPC · JPL
C/2012 K8	Lemmon	1.00266	6.46298	106.10996	5.9		2014/08/19	MPC · JPL
C/2012 S1	ISON	1.0002	0.0124526	62.404	8	0.5 km	2013/11/28	MPC · JPL
C/2012 S3	PanSTARRS	1.000716	2.308072	112.93082	11.1		2013/08/31	MPC · JPL
C/2012 T5	Bressi	1.000433	0.322826	72.0984	12.3		2013/02/24	MPC · JPL

=== 2013 ===
Comet designation	Name/ discoverer(s)	e	q (AU)	i (°)	Abs. mag (M1)	Nucleus radii	Perihelion date	Ref
C/2013 A1	Siding Spring	1.000086	1.399765	129.03292	8.5	0.435 km	2014/10/25	MPC · JPL
C/2013 B2	Catalina	1.00271	3.73414	43.45479	10.4		2013/07/01	MPC · JPL
C/2013 E1	McNaught	1.00225	7.78163	158.72038	5.5		2013/06/12	MPC · JPL
C/2013 F1	Boattini	1.00278	1.85998	78.687	11.8		2012/12/02	MPC · JPL
C/2013 G2	McNaught	1.00017	2.15413	96.002	10.8		2012/12/06	MPC · JPL
C/2013 G3	PanSTARRS	1.000463	3.852198	64.67148	7.4		2014/11/15	MPC · JPL
C/2013 G9	Tenagra	1.00183	5.33772	146.23985	4.9		2015/01/14	MPC · JPL
C/2013 H2	Boattini	1.00206	7.49866	128.3954	5.6		2014/01/23	MPC · JPL
C/2013 L2	Catalina	1.0008	4.8723	106.776	8.1		2012/05/11	MPC · JPL
C/2013 P3	Palomar	1.00113	8.64651	93.90358	4.6		2014/11/24	MPC · JPL
C/2013 S1	Catalina	1.0003	2.8243	83.96	13.5		2013/08/02	MPC · JPL
C/2013 US10	Catalina	1.000281	0.8229665	148.87831	8.0	2.2 km	2015/11/15	MPC · JPL
C/2013 V1	Boattini	1.001425	1.6608462	65.31009	10.8	4.695 km	2014/04/21	MPC · JPL
C/2013 V2	Borisov	1.00444	3.508034	37.8627	7.3	8.83 km	2014/10/14	MPC · JPL
C/2013 V4	Catalina	1.002705	5.185458	67.85189	7.0	40.735 km	2015/10/07	MPC · JPL
C/2013 X1	PanSTARRS	1.00105	1.314180	163.23239	7.9	2.7 km	2016/04/20	MPC · JPL

=== 2014 ===
Comet designation	Name/ discoverer(s)	e	q (AU)	i (°)	Abs. mag (M1)	Nucleus radii	Perihelion date	Ref
C/2014 A4	SONEAR	1.000847	4.180181	121.35970	8.0	15.975 km	2015/09/05	MPC · JPL
C/2014 AA_{52}	Catalina	1.000605	2.00317	105.1964	11.6		2015/02/27	MPC · JPL
C/2014 B1	Schwartz	1.00360	9.55661	28.37309	6.1	6.364 km	2017/09/10	MPC · JPL
C/2014 C2	STEREO	1.00000	0.51234	135.5022	14.4		2014/02/18	MPC · JPL
C/2014 L5	Lemmon	1.0027	6.2032	122.8031	5.7		2014/11/26	MPC · JPL
C/2014 M1	PanSTARRS	1.0023	5.577	160.178	5.9		2015/08/26	MPC · JPL
C/2014 S1	PanSTARRS	1.0010	8.14	123.8	6.9		2013/10/30	MPC · JPL
C/2014 W3	PanSTARRS	1.0069	6.066	90.11	8.9		2014/02/27	MPC · JPL
C/2014 W5	Lemmon–PanSTARRS	1.0	3	146	10.3	5.965 km	2016/02/11	MPC · JPL
C/2014 W6	Catalina	1.0017	3.0876	53.564	11.1		2015/03/19	MPC · JPL
C/2014 W10	PanSTARRS	1	8.0	90	7.4		2014/02/07	MPC · JPL
C/2014 Y1	PanSTARRS	1.00204	2.24085	14.92092	9.8	5.61 km	2016/01/17	MPC · JPL

=== 2015 ===
Comet designation	Name/ discoverer(s)	e	q (AU)	i (°)	Abs. mag (M1)	Nucleus radii	Perihelion date	Ref
C/2015 A2	PanSTARRS	1.0	5	108	10.4		2015/10/29	MPC · JPL
C/2015 B2	PanSTARRS	1.000168	3.369657	105.08820	9.9	8.405 km	2016/05/06	MPC · JPL
C/2015 D3	PanSTARRS	1.00255	8.14943	128.51615	8.6		2016/04/29	MPC · JPL
C/2015 ER_{61}-B (?)	PanSTARRS	1.00002	1.0442	6.351289	13.7	1.3 km	2017/05/09	MPC · JPL
C/2015 G2	MASTER	1.000394	0.779860	147.56281	11.6	1.0 km	2015/05/23	MPC · JPL
C/2015 H2	PanSTARRS	1.00248	4.96716	33.70545	5.3		2016/09/13	MPC · JPL
C/2015 J1	PanSTARRS	1.002	6.018	94.99	8.5		2014/06/29	MPC · JPL
C/2015 K4	PanSTARRS	1.0001	2.00765	80.254	14.4		2015/05/01	MPC · JPL
C/2015 LC_{2}	PanSTARRS	1.00181	5.89088	93.7094	7.8		2015/05/01	MPC · JPL
C/2015 P3	SWAN	1	0.715215	58.1838	16.3		2015/07/27	MPC · JPL
C/2015 T2	PanSTARRS	1.00027	6.93499	124.5356	5.7		2017/05/20	MPC · JPL
C/2015 V1	PanSTARRS	1.00020	4.26610	139.23082	5.0	17.28 km	2017/12/17	MPC · JPL
C/2015 V2	Johnson	1.001517	1.637017	49.87544	6.8	1.5 km	2017/06/12	MPC · JPL
C/2015 VL_{62}	Lemmon–Yeung–PanSTARRS	1.00204	2.720061	165.61360	7.9	0.848 km	2017/08/28	MPC · JPL
C/2015 W1	Gibbs	1.00132	2.23190	87.3190	12.9	6.7 km	2016/05/17	MPC · JPL
C/2015 X5	PanSTARRS	1.00222	6.8030	124.2731	5.5		2017/12/30	MPC · JPL
C/2015 X7	ATLAS	1.00165	3.684563	57.58264	9.6		2016/07/30	MPC · JPL
C/2015 XY_{1}	Lemmon	1.00196	7.9283	148.8300	5.0		2018/04/30	MPC · JPL

=== 2016 ===
Comet designation	Name/ discoverer(s)	e	q (AU)	i (°)	Abs. mag (M1)	Nucleus radii	Perihelion date	Ref
C/2016 A1	PanSTARRS	1.00138	5.3291	121.1843	5.7		2017/11/23	MPC · JPL
C/2016 C1	PanSTARRS	1.0051	8.4626	56.1789	6.5		2016/02/19	MPC · JPL
C/2016 E1	PanSTARRS	1.003	8.179	131.89	6.6		2017/05/30	MPC · JPL
C/2016 K1	LINEAR	1.00021	2.291505	90.8455	6.7	4.67 km	2016/07/13	MPC · JPL
C/2016 U1	NEOWISE	1.00026	0.319170	46.4349	13.4	1.025 km	2017/01/14	MPC · JPL
C/2016 X1	Lemmon	1.002	7.57	26.43	6.2		2019/04/30	MPC · JPL

=== 2017 ===
Comet designation	Name/ discoverer(s)	e	q (AU)	i (°)	Abs. mag (M1)	Nucleus radii	Perihelion date	Ref
C/2017 B3	LINEAR	1.0022	3.927	54.22	6.3	35.165 km	2019/02/02	MPC · JPL
C/2017 D3	ATLAS	1.00164	4.971314	125.64905	8.6		2017/04/26	MPC · JPL
C/2017 E1	Borisov	1.00257	0.90066	14.5541	14.3		2017/04/10	MPC · JPL
C/2017 E3	PanSTARRS	1.0123	5.92790	70.7006	5.3		2017/06/07	MPC · JPL
C/2017 F1	Lemmon	1.004	4.49982	146.48	7.5		2017/12/01	MPC · JPL
C/2017 F2	PanSTARRS	1.0052	6.9278	42.50764	8.2		2017/11/26	MPC · JPL
C/2017 K1	PanSTARRS	1.0022	7.2858	154.008	6.8		2018/03/13	MPC · JPL
C/2017 K2	PanSTARRS	1.00033	1.8111	87.5542	6.4	4.2 km	2022/12/21	MPC · JPL
C/2017 K5	PanSTARRS	1.00325	7.6835	82.2688	6.7		2020/03/21	MPC · JPL
C/2017 M4	ATLAS	1.00125	3.2526	105.6573	8.0	28.72 km	2019/01/18	MPC · JPL
C/2017 M5	TOTAS	1.0037	5.9876	15.8848	5.6		2018/06/02	MPC · JPL
C/2017 S3	PanSTARRS	1.00008	0.208	99.03862	13.3	0.66 km	2018/08/15	MPC · JPL
C/2017 S6	Catalina	1.00152	1.5430	152.8264	12.0	1.75 km	2018/02/26	MPC · JPL
C/2017 S7	Lemmon	1.00235	7.6144	124.22179	6.6		2017/05/27	MPC · JPL
C/2017 T1	Heinze	1.00043	0.58060	96.8463	11.4	3.22 km	2018/02/21	MPC · JPL
C/2017 U4	PanSTARRS	1.0027	7.7241	158.225	5.0		2018/09/25	MPC · JPL
C/2017 U7	PanSTARRS	1.00156	6.41823	142.6385	10.644	22.5 km	2019/09/10	MPC · JPL

=== 2018 ===
Comet designation	Name/ discoverer(s)	e	q (AU)	i (°)	Abs. mag (M1)	Nucleus radii	Perihelion date	Ref
C/2018 B1	Lemmon	1.0030	5.117	162.422	5.6		2018/03/30	MPC · JPL
C/2018 C2	Lemmon	1.0015	1.9563	34.452	15.1	4.4 km	2018/06/02	MPC · JPL
C/2018 F3	Johnson	1.00002	2.483	105.535	12.9		2017/08/15	MPC · JPL
C/2018 F4	PanSTARRS	1.0013	3.441	78.1112	7.0	0.1–10 km	2019/12/03	MPC · JPL
C/2018 N2	ASASSN	1.00010	3.1246	77.5386	7.1	6.35 km	2019/11/10	MPC · JPL
C/2018 U1	Lemmon	1.00166	4.99017	108.30231	5.6		2021/11/01	MPC · JPL
C/2018 V1	Machholz–Fujikawa–Iwamoto	1.00059	0.38697	143.98946	14.7		2018/12/03	MPC · JPL
C/2018 W2	Africano	1.00074	1.45465	116.6155	11.6	1.95 km	2019/09/05	MPC · JPL

=== 2019 ===
Comet designation	Name/ discoverer(s)	e	q (AU)	i (°)	Abs. mag (M1)	Nucleus radii	Perihelion date	Ref
C/2019 B3	PanSTARRS	1.003	6.826	66.5231	5.8		2021/01/19	MPC · JPL
C/2019 E3	ATLAS	1.0052	10.3171	84.2580	6.3	1.5 km	2023/11/11	MPC · JPL
C/2019 F1	ATLAS–Africano	1.0029	3.5976	54.1694	5.6	23.85 km	2021/06/22	MPC · JPL
C/2019 J3	ATLAS	1.0010	2.3735	131.416	11.9	1.485 km	2019/08/01	MPC · JPL
C/2019 K1	ATLAS	1.0006	2.0127	87.1577	13.3		2020/02/12	MPC · JPL
C/2019 K7	Smith	1.0023	4.475	103.5078	8.2	38.285 km	2020/06/16	MPC · JPL
C/2019 L3	ATLAS	1.00006	3.55	48.3667	6.3	7.9 km	2022/01/10	MPC · JPL
C/2019 M3	ATLAS	1.0022	2.418	99.438	13.4		2019/01/03	MPC · JPL
C/2019 M4	TESS	1.0045	9.181	65.71	4.6		2019/09/10	MPC · JPL
C/2019 O3	Palomar	1.0036	8.820	89.82	6.1	7.9 km	2021/03/08	MPC · JPL
C/2019 Q3	PanSTARRS	1.0046	7.25	65.545	8.7		2018/08/21	MPC · JPL
C/2019 Q4 (Note: Interstellar comet)	Borisov	3.314	1.997	44.137	11.8	0.2–0.5 km	2019/12/08	MPC · JPL
C/2019 U5	PanSTARRS	1.0014	3.624	113.52	8.5	30–47.5 km	2023/03/29	MPC · JPL
C/2019 Y4-A	ATLAS	1.002	0.2505	45.945	15.6		2020/05/31	MPC · JPL

=== 2020 ===
Comet designation	Name/ discoverer(s)	e	q (AU)	i (°)	Abs. mag (M1)	Nucleus radii	Perihelion date	Ref
C/2020 F2	ATLAS	1.0015	8.82	163.57	6.5		2022/07/16	MPC · JPL
C/2020 F5	MASTER	1.0024	4.327	51.702	8.4	36.86 km	2021/03/24	MPC · JPL
C/2020 H3	Wierzchos	1.0021	2.304	62.36	13.7		2020/06/03	MPC · JPL
C/2020 H6	ATLAS	1.0008	4.703	79.946	6.6	34.29 km	2021/09/30	MPC · JPL
C/2020 K5	PanSTARRS	1.00123	1.535	67.165	10.1		2021/06/05	MPC · JPL
C/2020 K8	Catalina–ATLAS	1.00015	0.47457	31.414	16.8		2020/09/14	MPC · JPL
C/2020 N1	PanSTARRS	1.0004	1.3207	29.7	11.4	2.29 km	2021/03/12	MPC · JPL
C/2020 O2	Amaral	1.0012	4.864	71.753	6.7		2021/08/28	MPC · JPL
C/2020 P1	NEOWISE	1.00025	0.3422	45.05	15.1	1.64 km	2020/10/20	MPC · JPL
C/2020 P4-A	SOHO	1.00020	0.0908	26.33	17.2		2020/08/08	MPC · JPL
C/2020 T4	PanSTARRS	1.00013	2.192	83.82	15.9		2021/07/05	MPC · JPL
C/2020 U4	PanSTARRS	1.0028	5.3537	167.04	6.8		2022/04/07	MPC · JPL
C/2020 V2	ZTF	1.0013	2.2274	131.6	6.6	1.1 km	2023/05/08	MPC · JPL
C/2020 W5	Lemmon	1.0010	3.3642	88.59	14.2		2020/11/30	MPC · JPL
C/2020 X3	SOHO	1.00	0.005	143.94		0.015 km	2020/12/14	MPC

=== 2021 ===
Comet designation	Name/ discoverer(s)	e	q (AU)	i (°)	Abs. mag (M1)	Nucleus radii	Perihelion date	Ref
C/2021 A1	Leonard	1.00010	0.615	132.69	10.0	0.6 km	2022/01/03	MPC · JPL
C/2021 A9	PanSTARRS	1.00371	7.756	158.03	6.2		2023/12/02	MPC · JPL
C/2021 C6	Lemmon	1.0020	3.271	164.63	15.5		2021/11/13	MPC · JPL
C/2021 D2	ZTF	1.0010	2.946	83.831	12.5		2022/02/03	MPC · JPL
C/2021 E3	ZTF	1.0004	1.777	112.569	4.8	2.245 km	2022/06/12	MPC · JPL
C/2021 G3	PanSTARRS	1.0012	5.181	102.883	7.6		2021/10/18	MPC · JPL
C/2021 K2	MASTER	1.0007	5.467	100.846	7.9		2021/09/08	MPC · JPL
C/2021 K3	Catalina	1.0035	5.230	134.813	14.5		2022/02/02	MPC · JPL
C/2021 L3	Borisov	1.0002	8.457	78.5802	5.9		2022/02/13	MPC · JPL
C/2021 O1	Nishimura	1.0031	0.787	27.568	11.0		2021/08/13	MPC · JPL
C/2021 O3	PanSTARRS	1.0001	0.287	56.760	12.8	1.0–1.7 km	2022/04/21	MPC · JPL
C/2021 P1	PanSTARRS	1.0002	4.375	51.622	12.6		2022/06/01	MPC · JPL
C/2021 Q4	Fuls	1.0036	7.568	71.476	6.9		2023/06/08	MPC · JPL
C/2021 S1	ATLAS	1.0004	6.119	52.090	6.7		2022/02/28	MPC · JPL
C/2021 S3	PanSTARRS	1.00009	1.320	58.53	9.8	9.375 km	2024/02/14	MPC · JPL
C/2021 T2	Fuls	1.0001	1.248	117.525	15.2		2022/06/07	MPC · JPL
C/2021 T4	Lemmon	1.0001	1.483	160.775	11.9	1.875 km	2023/07/31	MPC · JPL
C/2021 X1	Maury–Attard	1.0013	2.995	137.14	15.78	19.3 km	2022/07/08	MPC · JPL
C/2021 Y1	ATLAS	1.0006	2.033	77.190	6.7	8.945 km	2023/04/30	MPC · JPL

=== 2022 ===
Comet designation	Name/ discoverer(s)	e	q (AU)	i (°)	Abs. mag (M1)	Nucleus radii	Perihelion date	Ref
C/2022 A2	PanSTARRS	1.0007	1.735	108.15	5.8	5.12 km	2023/02/18	MPC · JPL
C/2022 E2	ATLAS	1.0016	3.666	137.15	6.3	44.28 km	2024/09/13	MPC · JPL
C/2022 E3	ZTF	1.0003	1.112	109.17	9.7	0.81–2.79 km	2023/01/12	MPC · JPL
C/2022 F1	ATLAS	1.0003	5.975	57.972	7.0		2022/08/05	MPC · JPL
C/2022 K1	Leonard	1.0027	3.987	41.980	8.5		2021/12/17	MPC · JPL
C/2022 L2	ATLAS	1.0009	2.691	129.31	5.6	6.835 km	2024/03/12	MPC · JPL
C/2022 N2	PanSTARRS	1.0042	3.827	5.501	6.8		2025/07/31	MPC · JPL
C/2022 O1	ATLAS	1.0049	7.430	71.045	5.8		2022/02/15	MPC · JPL
C/2022 R3	Leonard	1.0004	5.129	43.083	6.9		2023/03/04	MPC · JPL
C/2022 R6	PanSTARRS	1.0028	6.569	57.020	6.5		2025/08/25	MPC · JPL
C/2022 S3	PanSTARRS	1.0004	0.838	78.560	13.9	3.47 km	2023/01/21	MPC · JPL
C/2022 S4	Lemmon	1.0004	2.767	101.030	7.1	19.665 km	2024/07/18	MPC · JPL
C/2022 QE_{78}	ATLAS	1.0023	5.484	36.550	6.4		2025/09/10	MPC · JPL
C/2022 U3	Bok	1.0028	4.830	33.620	6.9		2024/07/27	MPC · JPL

=== 2023 ===
Comet designation	Name/ discoverer(s)	e	q (AU)	i (°)	Abs. mag (M1)	Nucleus radii	Perihelion date	Ref
C/2023 A3	Tsuchinshan–ATLAS	1.0002	0.391	139.119	6.3	5.9 km	2024/09/27	MPC · JPL
C/2023 F2	SOHO	1.0129	0.034	72.566	20.8		2023/03/21	MPC · JPL
C/2023 F3	ATLAS	1.0040	5.189	145.952	7.1		2025/02/02	MPC · JPL
C/2023 H5	Lemmon	1.0006	4.312	97.888	6.9		2025/06/30	MPC · JPL
C/2023 Q1	PanSTARRS	1.0042	2.574	36.679	7.4		2024/12/01	MPC · JPL
C/2023 R1	PanSTARRS	1.0005	3.57	149.31	6.9		2026/04/14	MPC · JPL
C/2023 R2	PanSTARRS	1.0008	0.906	30.746	11.2		2024/08/12	MPC · JPL
C/2023 V4	Camarasa–Duszanowicz	1.0010	1.122	67.128	9.8	9.65 km	2024/05/30	MPC · JPL
C/2023 V5	Leonard	1.0264	0.8488	73.925	21.4		2023/12/13	MPC · JPL
C/2023 X2	Lemmon	1.0007	5.103	76.97	6.9		2025/12/26	MPC · JPL
C/2023 X7	PanSTARRS	1.0020	4.822	69.06	13.0		2025/05/15	MPC · JPL

=== 2024 ===
Comet designation	Name/ discoverer(s)	e	q (AU)	i (°)	Abs. mag (M1)	Nucleus radii	Perihelion date	Ref
C/2024 A1	ATLAS	1.0013	3.876	94.45	5.8		2025/06/13	MPC · JPL
C/2024 B1	Lemmon	1.0010	1.633	70.88	10.4		2024/10/07	MPC · JPL
C/2024 E1	Wierzchos	1.0002	0.564	75.23	12.4	2–10 km	2026/01/20	MPC · JPL
C/2024 G3	ATLAS	1.00001	0.093	116.85	10.2		2025/01/13	MPC · JPL
C/2024 G6	ATLAS	1.0035	6.428	120.47	5.5		2026/02/20	MPC · JPL
C/2024 G7	ATLAS	1.0014	6.028	131.52	11.6		2025/02/10	MPC · JPL
C/2024 J3	ATLAS	1.0008	3.864	75.62	6.3		2026/11/25	MPC · JPL
C/2024 L3	PanSTARRS	1.0049	6.858	111.59	9.7		2023/11/24	MPC · JPL
C/2024 L5	ATLAS	1.0374	3.432	166.5729	6.7		2025/03/10	MPC · JPL
C/2024 N1	PanSTARRS	1.00105	4.398	88.77	7.5		2025/10/18	MPC · JPL
C/2024 N3	Sarneczky	1.00078	5.015	88.73	6.9		2025/04/11	MPC · JPL
C/2024 N4	Sarneczky	1.0043	5.398	49.77	11.7		2025/01/09	MPC · JPL
C/2024 O1	PanSTARRS	1.0018	6.608	59.07	13.3		2023/01/29	MPC · JPL
C/2024 Q3	PanSTARRS	1.0013	2.091	121.37	11.8		2025/03/05	MPC · JPL
C/2024 R4	PanSTARRS	1.0027	4.412	95.340	7.1		2027/10/26	MPC · JPL

=== 2025 ===
Comet designation	Name/ discoverer(s)	e	q (AU)	i (°)	Abs. mag (M1)	Nucleus radii	Perihelion date	Ref
C/2025 A1	Lemmon	1.00248	5.346	33.424	6.2		2027/03/12	MPC · JPL
C/2025 B1	PanSTARRS	1.0030	3.529	39.643	11.8		2025/06/26	MPC · JPL
C/2025 D1	Gröller	1.0030	14.12	84.491	6.6	0.4 km	2028/05/18	MPC · JPL
C/2025 F2	SWAN	1.000002	0.3334	90.370	12.3		2025/05/01	MPC · JPL
C/2025 J1	Borisov	1.0007	3.576	95.436	8.9		2026/06/11	MPC · JPL
C/2025 K1	ATLAS	1.0003	0.334	147.9	13.1	1–2 km	2025/10/08	MPC · JPL
C/2025 K3	PanSTARRS	1.0010	3.469	104.93	6.9		2028/12/14	MPC · JPL
C/2025 L1	ATLAS	1.0013	1.679	114.14	10.3		2026/01/12	MPC · JPL
C/2025 M2	PanSTARRS	1.0020	2.720	173.21	6.6		2027/11/23	MPC · JPL
C/2025 M3	PanSTARRS	1.01974	6.532	137.43	8.7		2026/07/05	MPC · JPL
C/2025 N1	ATLAS	6.1394	1.356	175.11	12.3	0.16–2.8 km	2025/10/29	MPC · JPL
C/2025 N2	ATLAS	1.00252	8.983	81.665	4.9		2024/12/11	MPC · JPL
C/2025 R3	PanSTARRS	1.00033	0.499	124.73	14.1		2026/04/19	MPC · JPL
C/2025 V1	Borisov	1.00958	0.463	112.72	16.4		2025/11/16	MPC · JPL
C/2025 V2	Rankin	1.00061	1.955	37.253	8.1		2027/03/27	MPC · JPL
C/2025 Y3	PanSTARRS	1.00074	2.227	89.549	16.8		2026/01/13	MPC · JPL

=== 2026 ===
Comet designation	Name/ discoverer(s)	e	q (AU)	i (°)	Abs. mag (M1)	Nucleus radii	Perihelion date	Ref
C/2026 A3	PanSTARRS	1.00159	4.825	157.38	7.1		2027/09/28	MPC · JPL
C/2026 H1	PanSTARRS	1.00082	6.084	115.59	8.8		2026/06/13	MPC · JPL
C/2026 H2	Leonard	1.00391	4.547	148.65	9.8		2026/03/17	MPC · JPL
C/2026 H3	Bok	1.00372	7.728	142.57	7.2		2026/05/23	MPC · JPL
C/2026 M3	MASTER	1.01000	12.088	94.038	9.3		2026/12/26	MPC · JPL
C/2026 O1	PanSTARRS	1.0084	1.500	137.26	7.0		2027/07/18	MPC · JPL

== See also ==
- List of comets by type
  - List of periodic comets
  - List of numbered comets
  - List of Halley-type comets
  - List of long-period comets
  - List of near-parabolic comets
  - List of Kreutz sungrazers
  - List of comets with no meaningful orbit
- List of Solar System objects by greatest aphelion
