= Comet Brooks =

Comet Brooks may refer to any one of 17 comets:

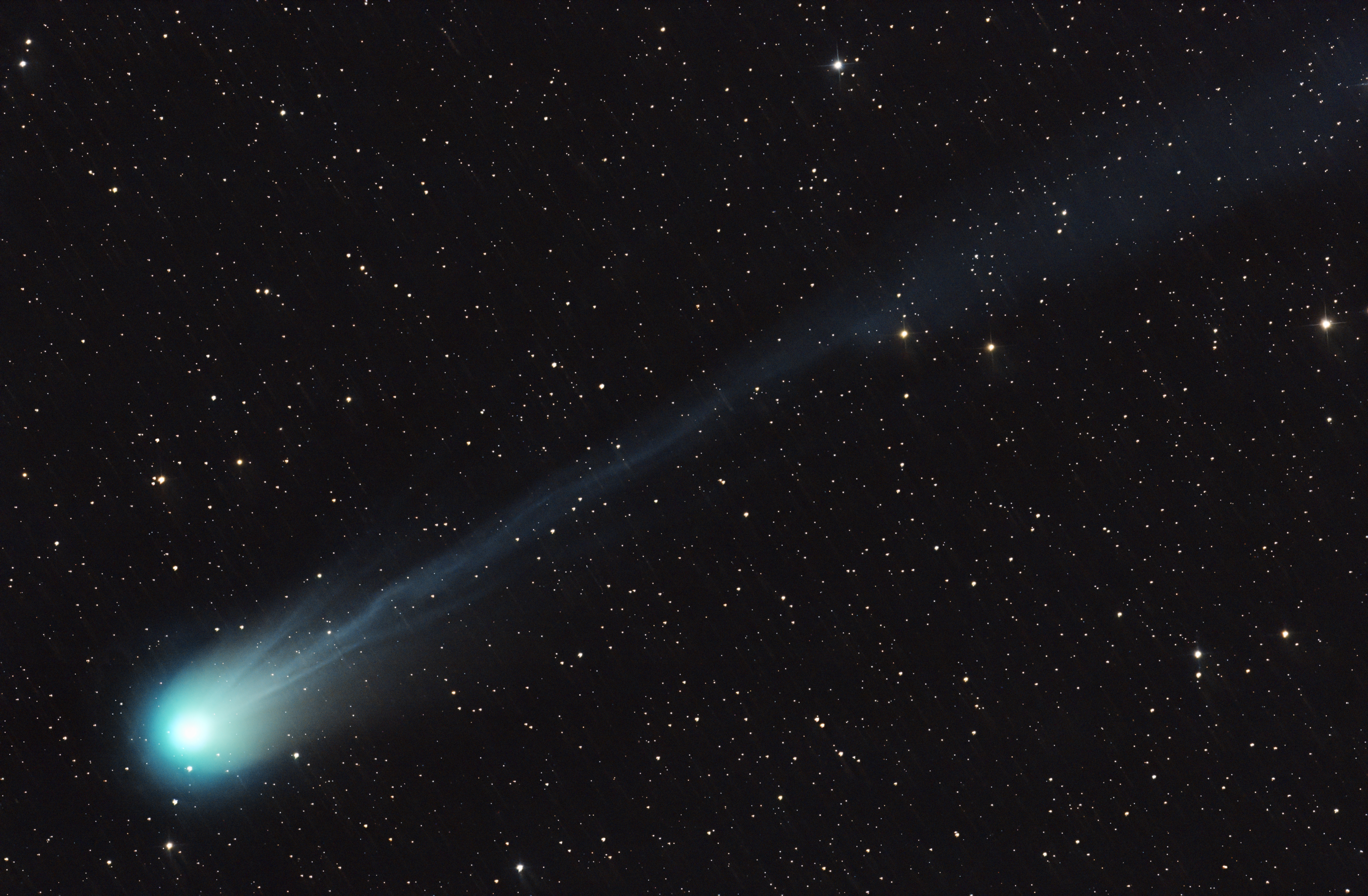
12P/Pons–Brooks

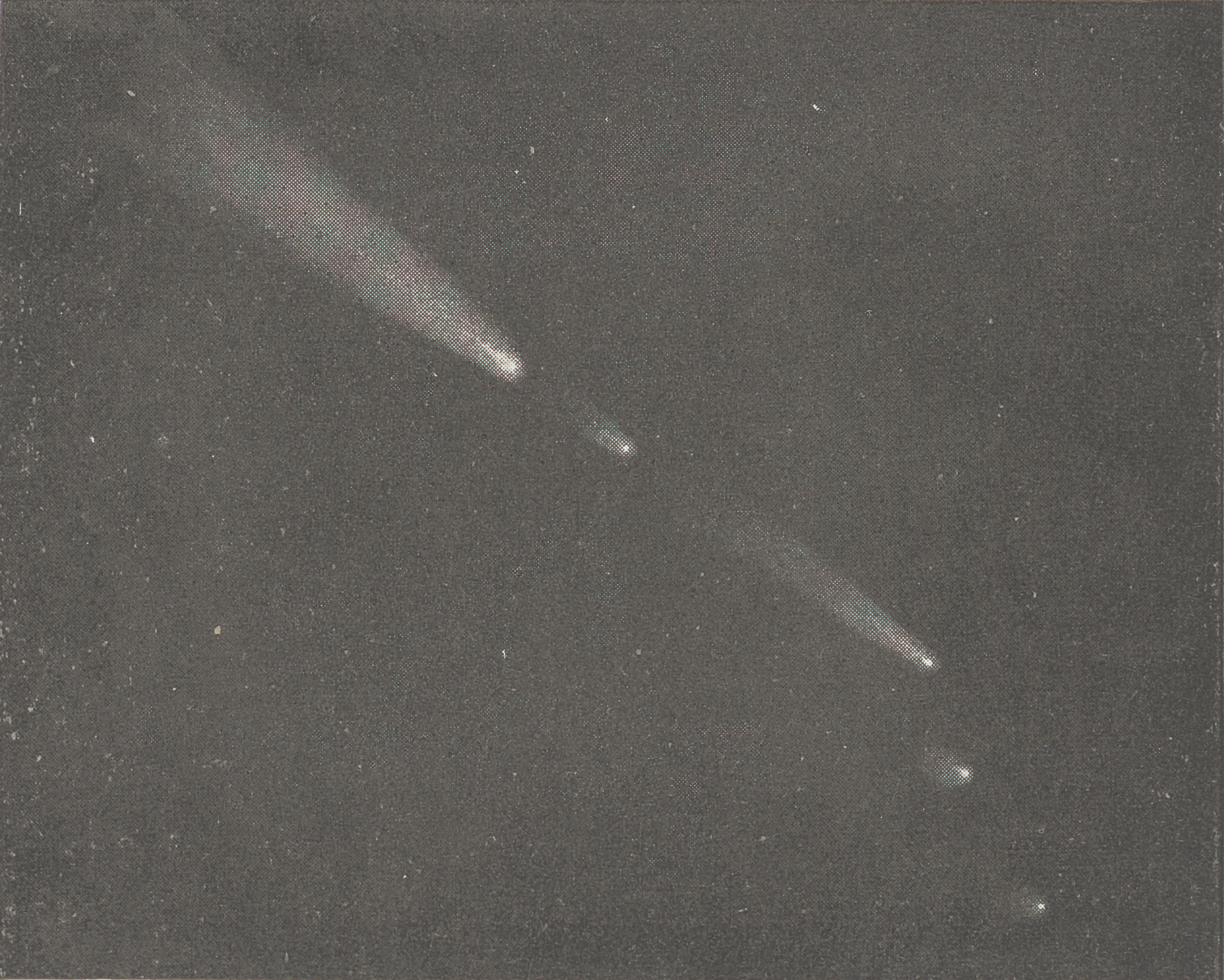
16P/Brooks

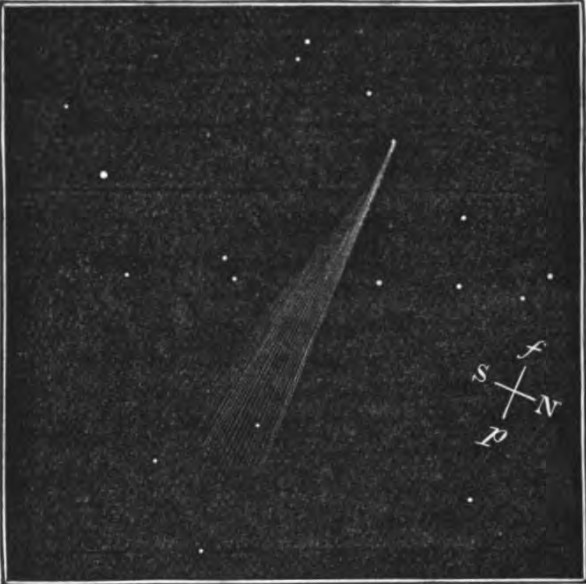
C/1886 J1 (Brooks)

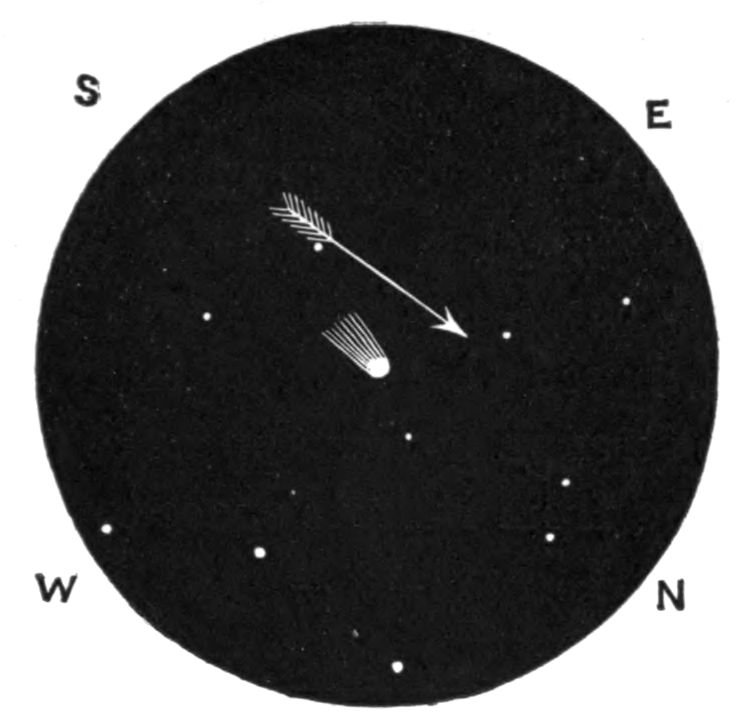
C/1890 F1 (Brooks)

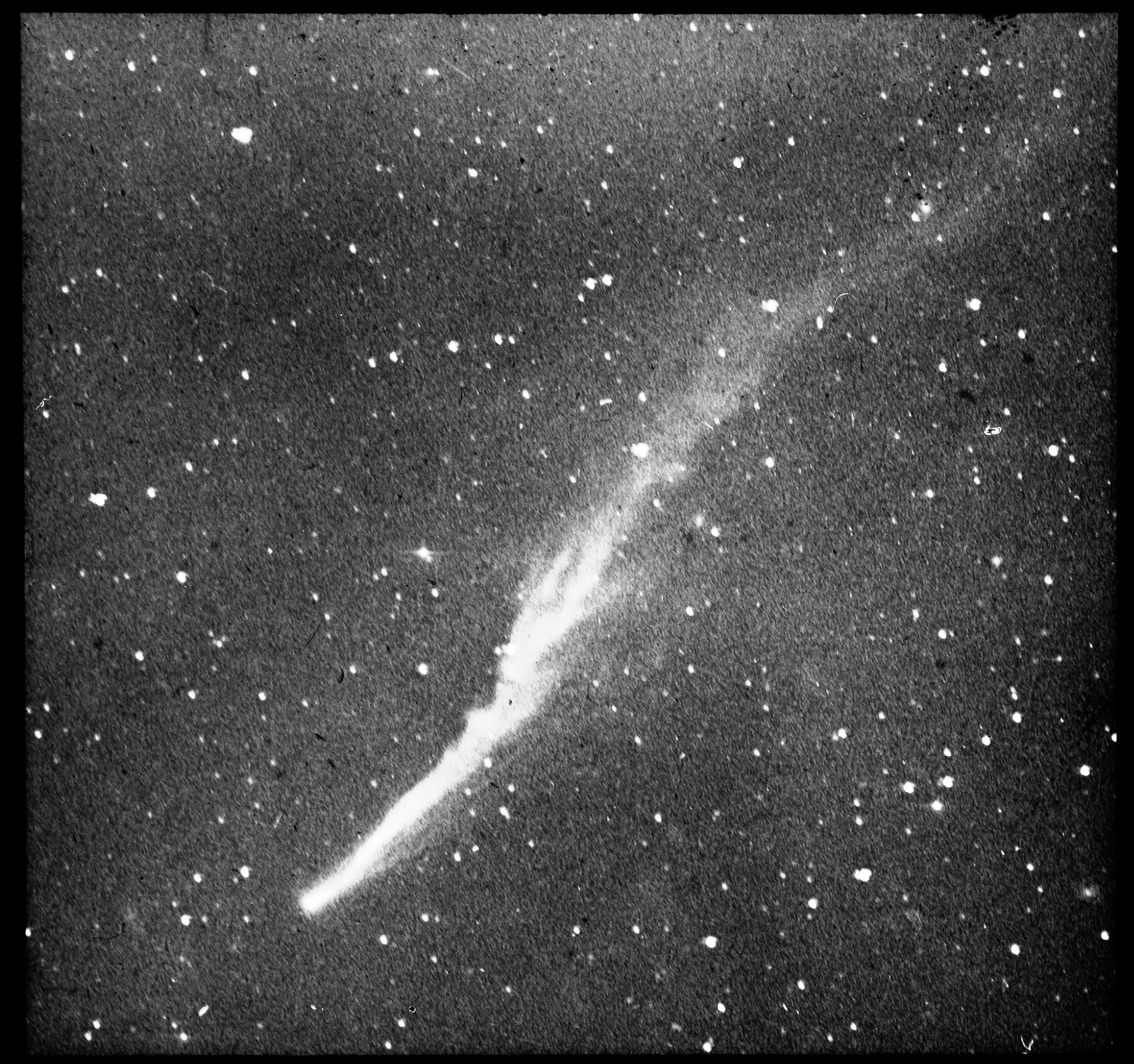
C/1893 U1 (Brooks)

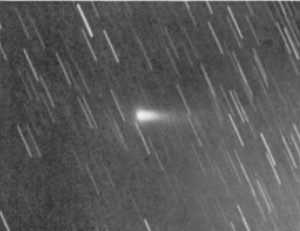
C/1900 O1 (Borrelly–Brooks)

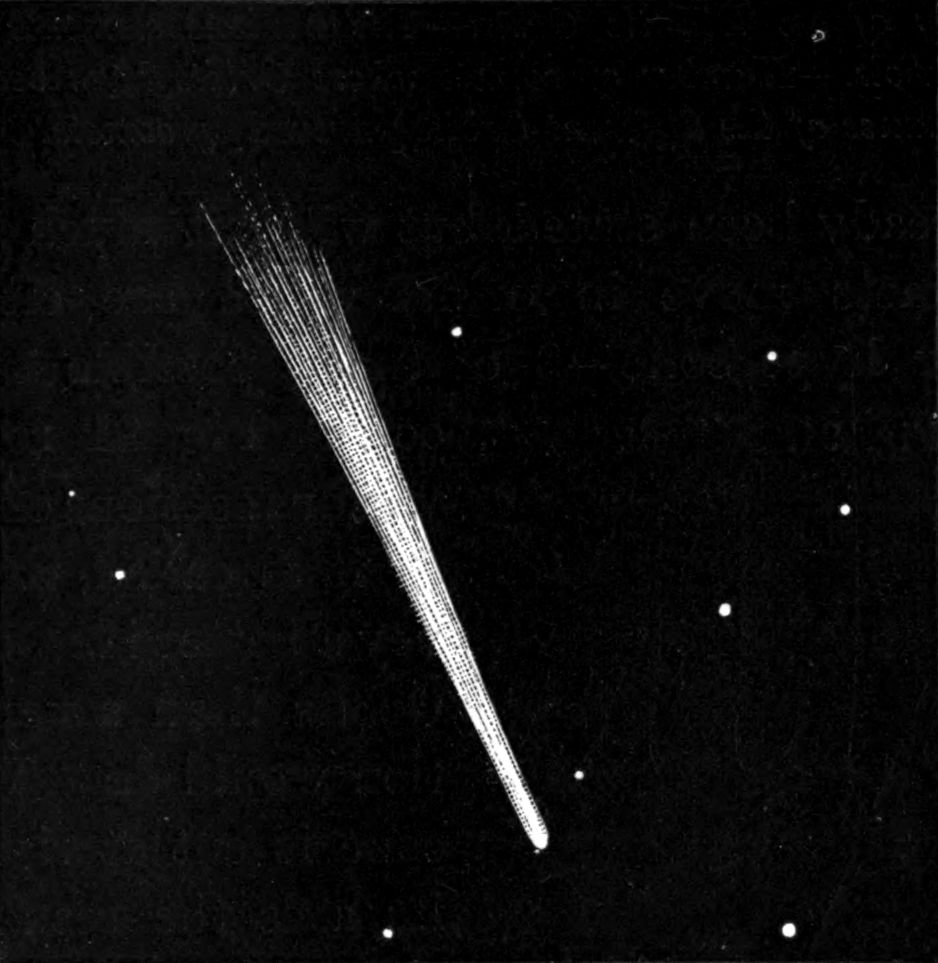
C/1902 G1 (Brooks)

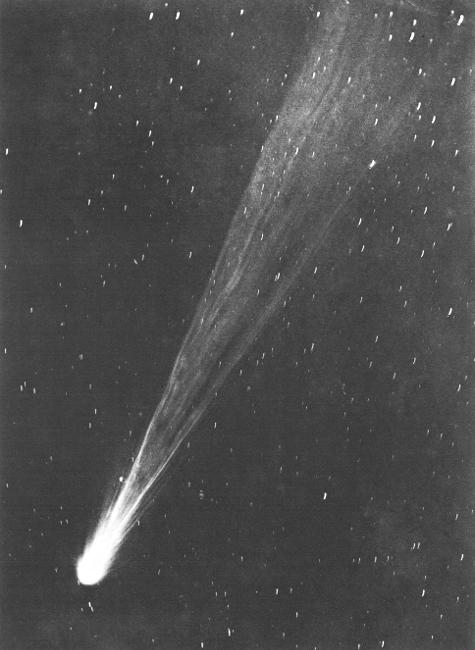
C/1911 O1 (Brooks)

- C/1885 R1 (a.k.a. 1885 III, 1885c)
- C/1885 Y1 (a.k.a. 1885 V, 1885f)
- C/1886 H1 (a.k.a. 1886 V, 1886a)
- C/1886 J1 (a.k.a. 1886 III, 1886b)
- D/1886 K1 (a.k.a. 1886 IV, 1886c)
- C/1887 B2 (a.k.a. 1887 II, 1887b)
- C/1888 P1 (a.k.a. 1888 III, 1888c)
- C/1890 F1 (a.k.a. 1890 II, 1890a)
- C/1892 Q1 (a.k.a. 1892 VI, 1892d)
- C/1892 W1 (a.k.a. 1893 I, 1892g)
- C/1893 U1 (a.k.a. 1893 IV, 1893c)
- C/1895 W2 (a.k.a. 1895 III, 1895d)
- C/1898 U1 (a.k.a. 1898 X, 1898i)
- C/1902 G1 (a.k.a. 1902 I, 1902a)
- C/1904 H1 (a.k.a. 1904 I, 1904a)
- C/1906 B1 (a.k.a. 1905 VI, 1906a)
- C/1911 O1 (a.k.a. 1911 V, 1911c)

There is also the periodic Comet Brooks:

- 16P/Brooks (a.k.a. Brooks 2, 16P/1889 N1, 1889 V, 1889d, 16P/1896 M1, 1896 VI, 1896c, 1903 V, 1903d, 1911 I, 1910d, 1925 IX, 1925g, 1932 VIII, 1932m, 1939 VII, 1939g, 1946 IV, 1946e, 1953 V, 1953b, 1960 VI, 1960h, 1974 I, 1973j, 1980 IX, 1980f, 1987 XXIV, 1987m, 1994 XXIII, 1994j)

Comet Brooks may also be a partial reference to:

- Comet Borrelly–Brooks, C/1900 O1 (a.k.a. 1900 II, 1900b)
- Comet Brooks–Swift, C/1883 D1 (a.k.a. 1883 I, 1883a)
- 12P/Pons–Brooks (a.k.a. 12P/1812 O1, 12P/1883 R1, 1884 I, 1883b, 12P/1953 M1, 1954 VII, 1953c)
