= William Herbert Steavenson =

English astronomer (1894–1975)

- Born: 26 April 1894; Quenington, England
- Died: 23 September 1975 (aged 81)
- Occupation: Astronomer

William Herbert Steavenson FRAS (26 April 1894 – 23 September 1975) was an English amateur astronomer.

== Early life and education ==
W. H. Steavenson was born in Quenington, Gloucestershire, England, on 26 April 1894 where his father was an Anglican vicar. He lost the vision in his right eye in a childhood accident. The family later moved to Cheltenham.

Steavenson developed an interest in astronomy as a child after receiving a small folding telescope as a gift. A little later he was given a larger telescope and experimented with photographing star fields using a camera attached to the telescope. In September 1911, while still a schoolboy at Cheltenham College, he independently discovered the comet C/1911 S2, but unfortunately for him he did not check his photograph quickly enough and credit went to Ferdinand Quénisset. Nevertheless, he was elected a Fellow of the Royal Astronomical Society on 12 January 1912 whilst still at school. He is believed to have been the youngest Fellow. Steavenson joined the British Astronomical Association on 28 May 1913.

He chose medicine as his profession and became a surgeon, but pursued astronomy his entire life and was a skilled observer. He moved to London to study at Guy's Hospital, setting up home at West Norwood. He subsequently practised medicine there as a family doctor. He erected there an observatory with 15-inch (38-cm) aperture reflecting telescope. He concentrated on variable stars, planets and their satellites, and comets, and also observed the remnants of old novae like Nova Persei 1901. He later set up a 20.5-inch (52-cm) aperture reflector.

== Later life ==
Steavenson studied how the human eye operates, particularly at the low-light levels encountered in visual astronomy. He measured the diameter of the pupil of a dark-adapted eye to be 1/3 inch (8.5 mm), which was larger than the figure that was believed at that time.

Steavenson also studied the optics of telescopes. He assessed the image quality provided by several large refracting telescopes.

Steavenson became noted as a historian of astronomy. He studied the collection of instruments belonging to the Herschel family at Slough, and became an authority on the work of the Herschels.

He moved to work as a family doctor in Cheltenham during the Second World War. He then moved to Cambridge, where he had a new 30-inch (76-cm) reflector erected in the grounds of the Cambridge Observatory and used it for visual observations.

During 1957–1959 he served as president of the Royal Astronomical Society, one of the few amateur astronomers to do so in the twentieth century. He was also Professor of Astronomy at Gresham College, and president of the British Astronomical Association from 1926 to 1928. He directed its Saturn Section 1917–1919, Mars Section 1922-1930 and its Method of Observation Section 1932–1961.

He worked for 30 years as astronomy correspondent for The Times and won the Jackson-Gwilt Medal of the Royal Astronomical Society in 1928.

W. H. Steavenson spent his last years living with family in South Marston, Wiltshire, where he died on 23 September 1975.

== See also ==
- Gresham Professor of Astronomy
