= C/1893 N1 (Rordame–Quénisset) =

Hyperbolic comet

C/1893 N1 (Rordame-Quénisset)
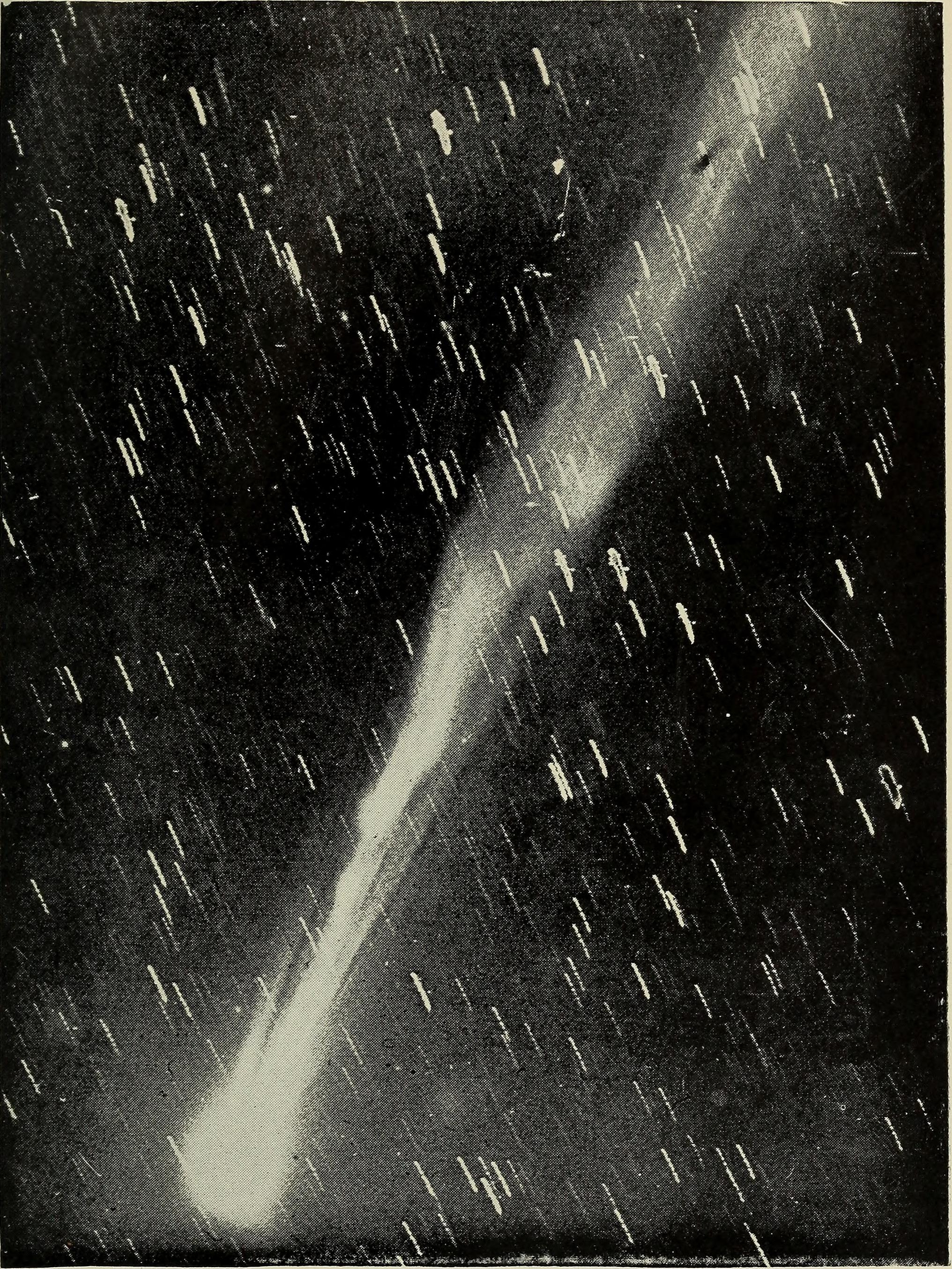
- Comet Rordame–Quénisset photographed by W. J. Hussey from the Lick Observatory on 13 July 1893

Discovery
- Discovered by: Alfred Rordame; Ferdinand Quénisset
- Discovery site: Salt Lake City, USA; Juvisy-sur-Orge, France
- Discovery date: 8–9 July 1893

Designations
- Alternative designations: 1893b 1893 II

Orbital characteristics
- Epoch: 19 July 1893 (JD 2412663.5)
- Observation arc: 15 days
- Earliest precovery date: 20 June 1893
- Number of observations: 15
- Perihelion: 0.6744 AU
- Eccentricity: 1.001703
- Inclination: 159.975°
- Longitude of ascending node: 338.861°
- Argument of periapsis: 47.149°
- Last perihelion: 7 July 1893
- T_{Jupiter}: –0.953
- Earth MOID: 0.1169 AU
- Jupiter MOID: 0.2267 AU

Physical characteristics
- Apparent magnitude: 3.0 (1893 apparition)

Comet Rordame–Quénisset, also known as C/1893 N1 by its modern nomenclature, is a hyperbolic comet that was visible in the naked eye in 1893. It was discovered independently by Alfred Rordame and Ferdinand Quénisset, though several astronomers reportedly saw the comet days before their respective discoveries.

== Discovery and observations ==
It is unknown who were the actual discoverers of C/1893 H1, however both Alfred Rordame and Ferdinand Quénisset were the first people to report the comet's discovery on 8 and 9 July 1893, respectively. The comet was a 3rd-magnitude object in the constellation Lynx at the time of discovery.

It was only later that it turned out that several other astronomers had already spotted the comet beforehand. Amateur astronomers, J. Miller and C. Johnson, claimed they have both observed the comet from Alta, Iowa about 2–3 hours before Rordame made his report to Lewis A. Swift. Across the Atlantic, Mario Roso de Luna reportedly saw the comet from Logrosan, Spain on 4 July, however he did not recognized it as a new comet until August 1893 when orbital calculations of de Luna's comet had concluded it was that same object as Rordame–Quénisset. The earliest known prediscovery observations of the comet was made on 20 June 1893, where William E. Sperra observed the comet a dozen times from Randolph, Ohio but he mistook it for 15P/Finlay in his observation reports.

Orbital calculations in October 1893 determined that the comet had already passed perihelion a day before the official discovery reports were made. It was last observed as a 6th-magnitude object on 3 August 1893, as further observations were made difficult due to increasingly unfavourable low positions in the night sky and a bright full Moon at the time.

== See also ==
- C/1893 U1 (Brooks)
