= C/1893 U1 (Brooks) =

Non-periodic comet

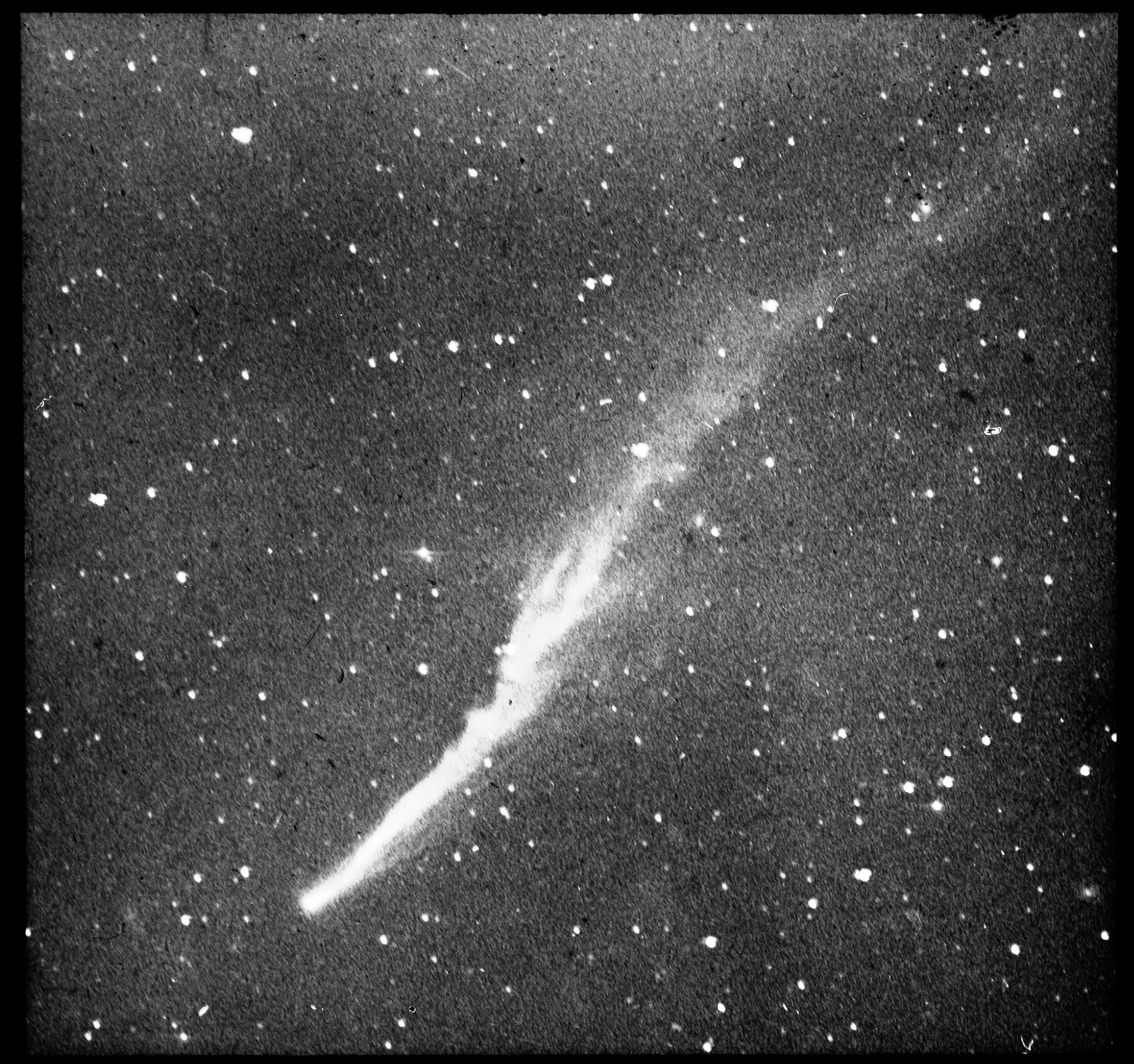
- Comet Brooks photographed by Edward E. Barnard from the Lick Observatory on 21 October 1893

Discovery
- Discovered by: William Robert Brooks
- Discovery site: Smith Observatory
- Discovery date: 17 October 1893

Designations
- Alternative designations: 1893c 1893 IV

Orbital characteristics
- Observation arc: 82 days
- Number of observations: 153
- Aphelion: 461.73 AU
- Perihelion: 0.812 AU
- Semi-major axis: 231.27 AU
- Eccentricity: 0.99649
- Orbital period: ~3,520 years
- Max. orbital speed: 46.7 km/s
- Inclination: 129.823°
- Longitude of ascending node: 176.414°
- Argument of periapsis: 347.452°
- Last perihelion: 19 September 1893
- T_{Jupiter}: –0.692

Comet Brooks, formally designated as C/1893 U1, is a non-periodic comet that became visible through telescopes in late 1893. This comet might be the parent body of the Gamma Normids meteor shower (alongside C/1864 R1).

== Discovery and observations ==
William Robert Brooks spotted a new comet on the morning of 17 October 1893 from his observatory in Geneva, New York. At the time of discovery, it was a 7th-magnitude object located within the constellation Virgo. One day later, Edward E. Barnard made follow-up observations of the comet, noting it had a deformed tail about 4 degrees long. Barnard continued his photographic sessions of the comet throughout November 1893, documenting its changes in structure. It was last observed by Herbert C. Wilson on the evening of 26 January 1894.

== See also ==
- C/1893 N1 (Rordame–Quénisset)
