= Randolph Township, Indiana =

Randolph Township, Indiana may refer to one of the following places:

- Randolph Township, Ohio County, Indiana
- Randolph Township, Tippecanoe County, Indiana

== See also ==
- Randolph Township (disambiguation)
