= C/1902 G1 (Brooks) =

Parabolic comet

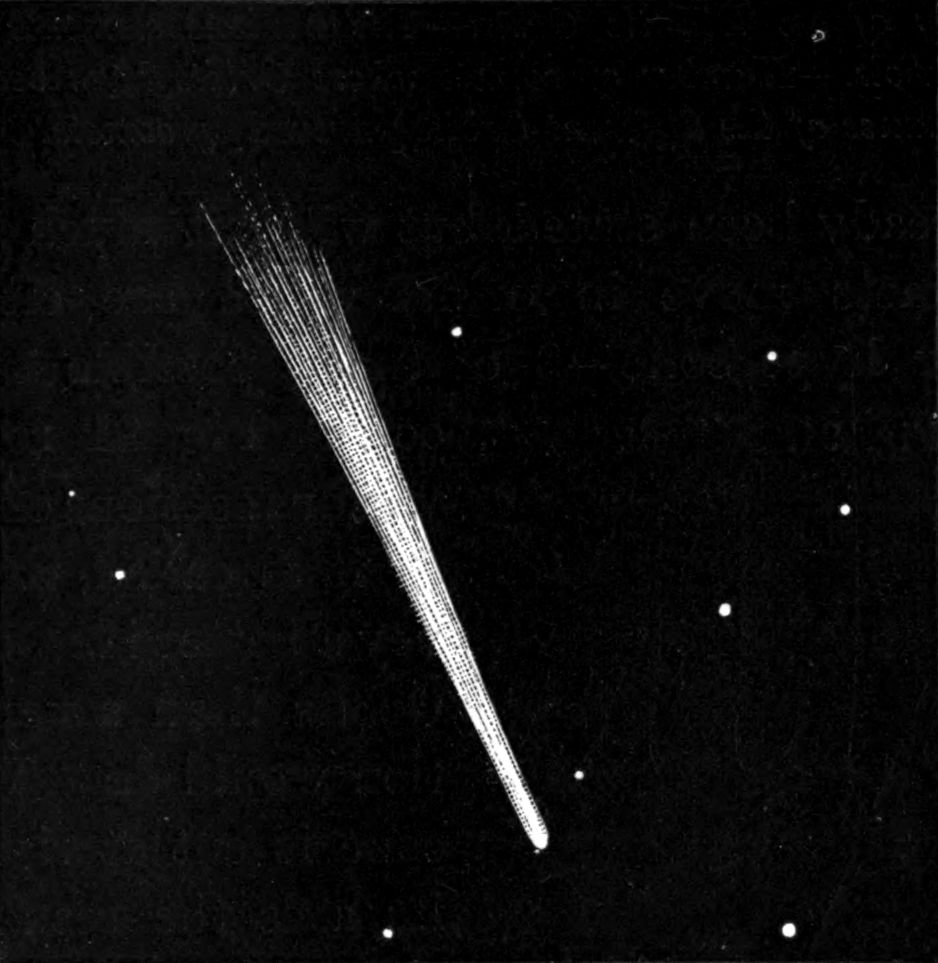
- Drawing of the comet C/1902 G1 by its discoverer, William Robert Brooks, on 15 April 1902.

Discovery
- Discovered by: William R. Brooks
- Discovery site: Smith Observatory
- Discovery date: 15 April 1902

Designations
- Alternative designations: 1902 I, 1902a

Orbital characteristics
- Epoch: 7 May 1902 (JD 2415877.296)
- Observation arc: 5 days
- Number of observations: 9
- Perihelion: 0.444 AU
- Eccentricity: ~1.000
- Inclination: 65.301°
- Longitude of ascending node: 54.033°
- Argument of periapsis: 229.621°
- Last perihelion: 7 May 1902

Physical characteristics
- Mean radius: 0.239 km (0.149 mi) (Note: Calculated mean radius using the formula: $\log_{10}\,(\,R\,)\ =\;0.9 +\;0.13 (\,H\,)$ Where $\,H\,$ is the comet's absolute total magnitude (M1))
- Comet total magnitude (M1): 11.7
- Apparent magnitude: 8.5 (1902 apparition)

Comet Brooks, also known by its modern designation C/1902 G1, is a non-periodic comet that was only observed for five days in April 1902. Bright moonlight conditions and unfavorable weather conditions prevented additional observations of the comet. As a result, orbital calculations for it were not sufficient to obtain a hyperbolic or near-parabolic orbit around the Sun.

== Orbit ==
Despite having a short observation arc of only five days, astronomers were still able to calculate a parabolic trajectory for the comet. S. K. Winther and Robert Grant Aitken used positions recorded between 16–17 April 1902 to create a parabolic trajectory with a perihelion date of 6 May 1902. At the same time, Armin Otto Leuschner and his colleagues calculated that the comet may have a 0.88-year elliptical orbit around the Sun, the shortest of any comet known, where they also noted that it is probably the same object as C/1748 K1 (Klinkenberg), however their calculations were later refuted. Heinrich Kreutz, Elis Strömgren and S. Scharbe revised Aitken's calculations using positions up to 20 April 1902, concluding that the comet must have reached perihelion by 7 May 1902.
