= C/1890 F1 (Brooks) =

Hyperbolic comet

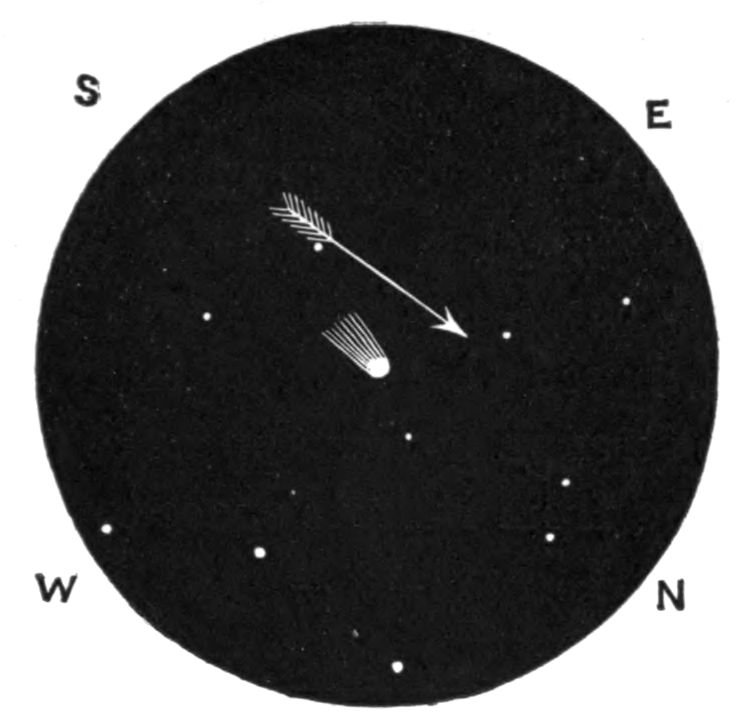
- Drawing of the comet by its discoverer, William Robert Brooks, on 19 March 1890

Discovery
- Discovered by: William R. Brooks
- Discovery site: Smith Observatory
- Discovery date: 19 March 1890

Designations
- Alternative designations: 1890 II, 1890a

Orbital characteristics
- Epoch: 17 September 1890 (JD 2411627.5)
- Observation arc: 1.88 years
- Number of observations: 140
- Perihelion: 1.908 AU
- Eccentricity: 1.00034
- Inclination: 120.57°
- Longitude of ascending node: 321.88°
- Argument of periapsis: 68.931°
- Mean anomaly: 0.0002°
- Last perihelion: 2 June 1890
- Earth MOID: 1.301 AU
- Jupiter MOID: 0.222 AU

Physical characteristics
- Comet nuclear magnitude (M2): 3.3
- Apparent magnitude: 7.3 (1890 apparition)

Comet Brooks, formally designated as C/1890 F1, is a hyperbolic comet that was visible through telescopes between March 1890 and February 1892.

== Observational history ==
=== Discovery ===
William Robert Brooks discovered C/1890 F1 as a "bright, telescopic object with a stellar nucleus and short tail" near NGC 7045 on the night of 19 March 1890.

=== Follow-up observations ===
The comet was observed by Edward Emerson Barnard from 24 March to 31 August 1890, where he initially estimated the comet's apparent magnitude as 10.0.

== Orbit ==
The first orbital calculation for the comet was published by G. M. Searle using positions recorded between 22 and 25 March 1891. He and other astronomers, William Wallace Campbell, F. Bidschof, Armin Otto Leuschner, E. Viennet, and George A. Hill, determined a weakly hyperbolic trajectory with a perihelion date of 3 June 1890. E. Strömgren later revised the orbital calculations in 1896, applying perturbations of the Earth, Mars, Jupiter, and Saturn, with the new perihelion date having occurred on 3 June 1890.

Reanalysis of data in 2016 revealed that C/1890 F1 may have been a dynamically old comet that has entered the inner Solar System three times in the past 4 million years. With the comet suffered only small planetary perturbations, it is predicted that it will become an Oort spike comet by its next apparition.
