= C/1886 J1 (Brooks) =

Parabolic comet

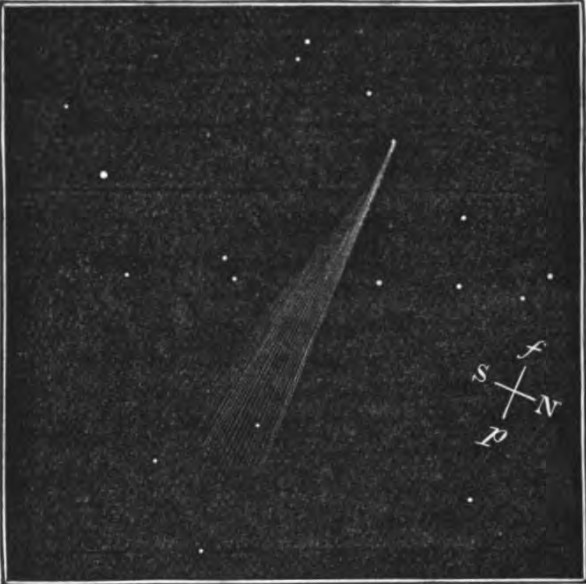
- Telescopic view of Comet Brooks, drawn by Edward E. Barnard from Nashville, Tennessee on 7 May 1886.

Discovery
- Discovered by: William Robert Brooks
- Discovery site: Phelps, New York
- Discovery date: 1 May 1886

Designations
- Alternative designations: 1886 III, 1886b

Orbital characteristics
- Epoch: 9 May 1886 (JD 2410035.5)
- Observation arc: 19 days
- Number of observations: 19
- Aphelion: ~4,200 AU (inbound)
- Perihelion: 0.842 AU
- Semi-major axis: ~2,100 AU (inbound)
- Eccentricity: 0.99959 (inbound); 1.00020 (outbound)
- Inclination: 100.21°
- Longitude of ascending node: 289.36°
- Argument of periapsis: 38.593°
- Last perihelion: 4 May 1886
- Earth MOID: 0.067 AU
- Jupiter MOID: 0.720 AU

Physical characteristics
- Comet total magnitude (M1): 4.9
- Apparent magnitude: 7.0–8.0 (1886 apparition)

C/1886 J1 (Brooks) is a parabolic comet that was observed between May and June 1886. It was William Robert Brooks's second comet discovery in 1886, and his fifth overall.

== Observational history ==
Just two days after discovering his first comet of the year, (Note: William Robert Brooks discovered C/1886 H1 on 28 April 1886.) Brooks spotted another one within the constellation Pegasus on 1 May 1886, (Note: Reported initial position upon discovery was: α = 23^{h} 00^{m} , δ = 21° 00′) which he described as "having a small, but bright and stellar head, and a conspicuous tail". By 3 May, E. A. Lamp observed the comet from Kiel, noting that it was "very bright in twilight with a notable tail and yellowish nucleus". At the time, the comet was around magnitude 7.0–8.0 in brightness.

== Orbit ==
A number of astronomers, including Adolf Berberich, Edgar Frisby and H. V. Egbert, Rudolf F. Spitaler and Hermann Oppenheim, and Giovanni Celoria, calculated the orbit for C/1886 J1, concluding with a parabolic solution using the observations taken within a span of 19 days. Later, in 1908 and 1909, Caroline E. Furness and Emma P. Waterman, as well as Hermann Kobold, would revise their solutions into a weakly hyperbolic trajectory, indicating that the comet reached perihelion on 4 May 1886 at a distance of 0.842 AU (126.0 million km) from the Sun.

== Potential meteor shower ==
While working on his own orbital calculations for the comet, Edmund Weiss noticed that the ascending node for C/1886 J1 passed within 0.067 AU (10.0 million km) from Earth's orbit, suggesting a possibility of a meteor shower that may occur in a radiant within the constellation Phoenix. (Note: The potential meteor shower's radiant was predicted at the following coordinates: α = 1.2^{h} 00^{m} , δ = –42° 00′) However, no such meteor shower activity was detected.
