= 13P/Olbers =

Halley-type comet

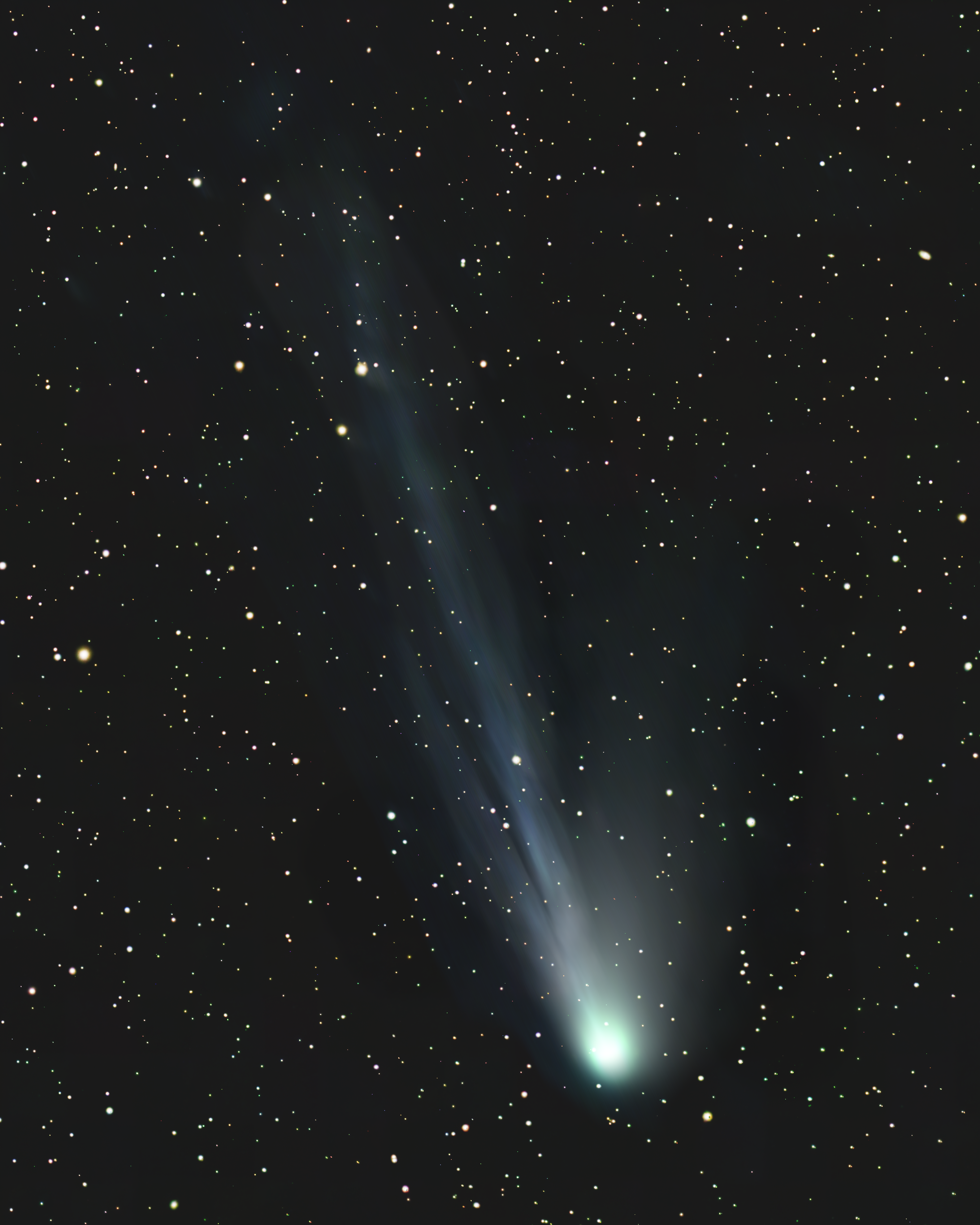
- Comet Olbers photographed by Don Heffernan on 11 August 2024

Discovery
- Discovered by: Heinrich Olbers
- Discovery date: 6 March 1815

Designations
- MPC designation: P/1815 E1, P/1887 Q1; P/1956 A1
- Alternative designations: 1815 I, 1887 V, 1956 IV; 1887f, 1956a

Orbital characteristics
- Epoch: 21 November 2025 (JD 2461000.5)
- Observation arc: 210.40 years (Note: Observation arc from the Minor Planet Center database only covered dates from 27 August 1887 until 31 July 2025 (137.93 years). The following figure represented its entire arc up to 6 March 1815.)
- Number of observations: 2,748
- Aphelion: 32.676 AU
- Perihelion: 1.175 AU
- Semi-major axis: 16.926 AU
- Eccentricity: 0.93056
- Orbital period: 69.634 years
- Inclination: 44.664°
- Longitude of ascending node: 85.846°
- Argument of periapsis: 64.425°
- Mean anomaly: 7.203°
- Last perihelion: 30 June 2024
- Next perihelion: 20 March 2094
- T_{Jupiter}: 1.251
- Earth MOID: 0.471 AU
- Jupiter MOID: 0.713 AU

Physical characteristics
- Mean radius: ≤ 10 km (6.2 mi)
- Comet total magnitude (M1): 6.9
- Apparent magnitude: 6.0 (2024 apparition)

13P/Olbers is a periodic comet with an orbital period of 69 years. It fits the classical definition of a Halley-type comet with a period between 20 and 200 years. The comet last passed perihelion 30 June 2024 and it was previously seen in 1956. The next perihelion is in 2094. It is the third of three comets discovered by German astronomer, Heinrich Olbers. (Note: Olbers had previously discovered C/1780 U1 (Montaigne–Olbers) and C/1796 F1 (Olbers))

== Observational history ==
=== Discovery ===
Heinrich Wilhelm Matthias Olbers discovered the comet on 6 March 1815 and described it as small. The comet came to perihelion on 26 April 1815 and reached an apparent magnitude of about 5, and was faintly visible by naked eye. Its orbit was first computed by Carl Friedrich Gauss on March 31 as parabolic, and Friedrich Bessel calculated an orbital period of 73.9 years using observations from June. Calculations by other astronomers during that era resulted anywhere between 72 and 77 years. Modern solutions give an orbital period of 74.9 years for the 1815 epoch.

=== 1887 ===
Orbital period at different epochs
Epoch	Orbital period (years)
1887	72.37
1956	69.54
2024	69.25
2094	70.72

There were unsuccessful searches for the comet throughout 1887, until it was accidentally found by William Robert Brooks on 25 August 1887. He described as an easy object to see through a 9-inch reflector, with a brightish nucleus and a faint tail; it continued to brighten for a few days after passing perihelion. The comet brightened to an apparent magnitude of about 9. On 28 July 1887 the comet passed 0.081 AU (12.1 million km) from Mars and then passed perihelion on 8 October 1887.

=== 1956 ===
The comet was recovered on 4 January 1956 by Antonín Mrkos. The comet was then located in Eridanus and its apparent magnitude was estimated to be 16. He then found the comet in plates obtained by the McDonald Observatory on 12 November 1955. The comet passed perihelion on 19 June 1956 and reached an apparent magnitude of 6.5, while its tail was about one degree long.

=== 2024 ===
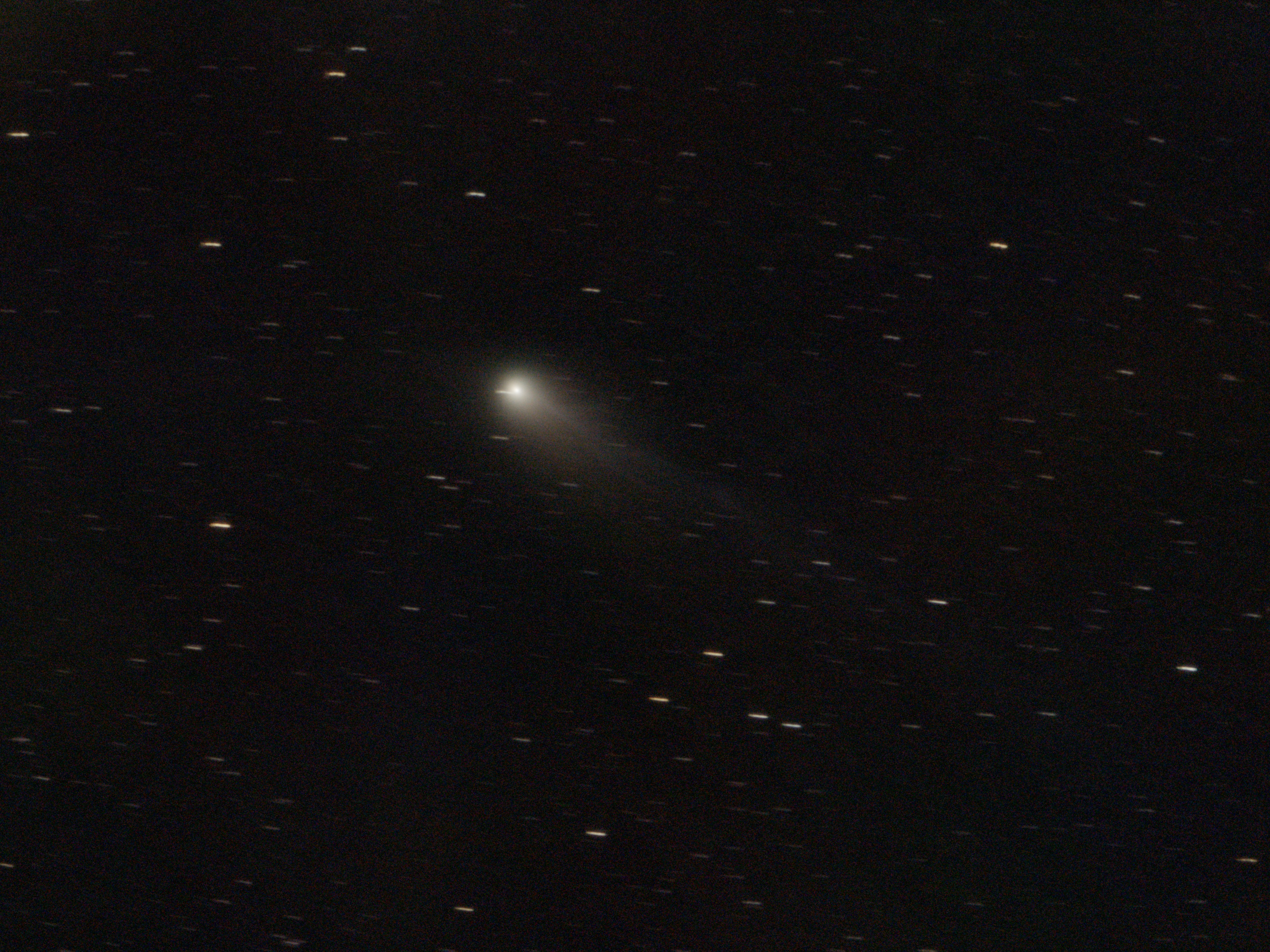
Comet Olbers on 24 June 2024

The comet was recovered on 24 August 2023 by Alan Hale with the Las Cumbres Observatory at Siding Spring, and then additional pre-recovery images from August 13 were located. The comet then had an estimated apparent magnitude of about 22. On 16 November 2023 the comet came to opposition 139 degrees from the Sun. On 14 January 2024 the comet had an estimated magnitude of 15.3, was reported to have a strongly condensed coma measuring 0.9 arcminutes across and a faint tail one arcminute. By 10 March 2024 the comet had brightened to a magnitude of 11.4 and the coma was 4 arcminutes across. The comet was observed visually on April 12 to have a magnitude of 9.2, being a magnitude brighter than the ephemeris. It came to perihelion on 30 June 2024, when it was 1.18 AU (177 million km) from the Sun and 1.94 AU (290 million km) from Earth. It was expected to brighten to about apparent magnitude 7−8 but peaked at 6–7.

Earth close approach
Date	Distance (AU)	Solar elongation
2024-Jul-20	1.895 AU (283.5 million km)	35°
2094-Jan-09	0.676 AU (101.1 million km)	134°

=== 2094 ===
Before the 2023 recovery, while the last observation was in 1956, Kinoshita calculated that the comet would come to a future perihelion passage (closest approach to the Sun) on 22 March 2094. Accounting for observations in 2023–4, the nominal time of perihelion passage is now calculated to be 20 March 2094.

== Physical characteristics ==
=== Chemical composition ===
Measurements from the SWAN instrument aboard SOHO indicated that it reached its maximum water production rate of 1.1×10^{29} sec^{−1} on 3 June 2024, and although irregular and scattered compared to 12P/Pons–Brooks, it did generally increased as it got closer to the Sun. Infrared spectroscopy conducted at the NASA Infrared Telescope Facility (IRTF) revealed abundances of H_{2}O, OCS, C_{2}H_{6}, CH_{3}OH, and H_{2}CO, with significantly enriched amounts of CO and CH_{4} were reported.

=== Nucleus size ===
The unusual CO enrichment in 13P/Olbers implied that its nucleus has an upper limit of about 20–30 km (12–19 mi) in radius. However, this assumes that there's a correlation between the nucleus size and the abundance ratio of CO/H_{2}O within the comet itself, whereas the more active periodic comets like 1P/Halley and 23P/Brorsen–Metcalf were substantially smaller. With the water production rate of 13P is measured to be comparable to between the two aforementioned comets at 1.36 AU (203 million km) from the Sun, the actual size of its nucleus is likely to be smaller, ranging from several to about 10 km (6.2 mi) in radius.

== Meteor showers ==
There is some speculation that 13P/Olbers has an associated annual meteor shower on Mars coming from the direction of Beta Canis Majoris. The minimum orbit intersection distance of the orbits of comet Olbers and Mars is 0.0266 AU (3.98 million km) and the meteors impact the planet with a velocity of 27 km/s. An intersection distance of less than 0.1 AU and an impact speed high enough for the meteors to become ablaze are considered good predictors for a potential meteor shower.

== Notes ==
Numbered comets
Previous; 12P/Pons–Brooks	13P/Olbers	Next; 14P/Wolf
