= C/1864 R1 (Donati) =

Parabolic comet

Discovery
- Discovered by: Giovanni B. Donati
- Discovery site: Florence, Italy
- Discovery date: 10 September 1864

Designations
- Alternative designations: 1864 I

Orbital characteristics
- Epoch: 28 July 1864 (JD 2402080.8118)
- Observation arc: 29 days
- Number of observations: 20
- Perihelion: 0.6261 AU
- Eccentricity: ~1.000
- Inclination: 134.982°
- Longitude of ascending node: 176.881°
- Argument of periapsis: 346.095°
- Last perihelion: 28 July 1864
- Comet total magnitude (M1): 7.0

Comet Donati, formally designated as C/1864 R1, is a parabolic comet discovered in 1864. It was the last of five comets discovered by Italian astronomer, Giovanni Battista Donati. This comet might be the potential parent body of the Gamma Normids meteor shower (alongside C/1893 U1).

== Discovery and observations ==
The comet was already on its outbound flight when it was first spotted by Giovanni Battista Donati on the night of 10 September 1864, where it was initially located within the constellation Leo Minor. (Note: Reported initial position upon discovery was: α = 10^{h} 23.3^{m} , δ = 35° 21′) As a result, further observations of the comet became increasingly difficult as it slowly faded away, leading to astronomers being unable to obtain its precise orbital elements. The last known observation of the comet was recorded on 20 October 1864.
