= C/1911 O1 (Brooks) =

Long-period comet

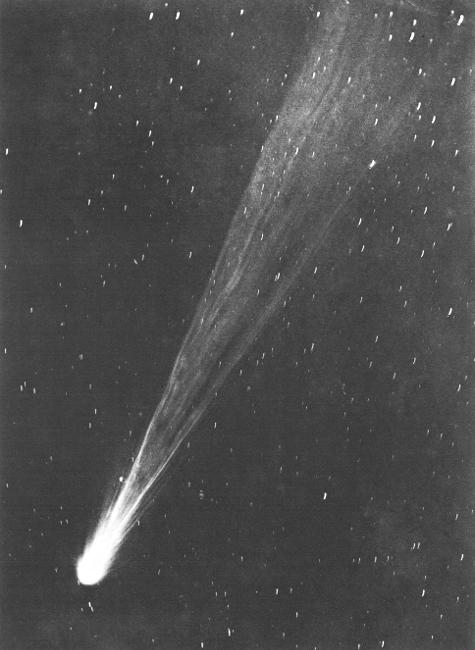
- Comet Brooks photographed by Paul L. Anderson shortly before its last perihelion, 19 October 1911

Discovery
- Discovered by: William R. Brooks
- Discovery site: Smith Observatory
- Discovery date: 21 July 1911

Designations
- Alternative designations: 1911 V, 1911c

Orbital characteristics
- Epoch: 27 August 1911 (JD 2419275.5)
- Observation arc: 10 days
- Number of observations: 8
- Aphelion: 78.6906 AU
- Perihelion: 0.48982 AU
- Semi-major axis: 39.5902 AU
- Eccentricity: 0.98763
- Orbital period: 249.109 years
- Inclination: 33.8095°
- Longitude of ascending node: 293.704°
- Argument of periapsis: 153.557°
- Last perihelion: 28 October 1911
- Next perihelion: ~2160
- T_{Jupiter}: 0.854
- Earth MOID: 0.4167 AU
- Jupiter MOID: 0.4506 AU

Physical characteristics
- Apparent magnitude: 2.0 (1911 apparition)

C/1911 O1 (Brooks), also designated 1911 V or Comet Brooks, was a bright comet discovered in July 1911 by astronomer William Robert Brooks.

It is notable for becoming a bright naked-eye object of second magnitude, with a narrow straight tail of up to thirty degrees in length and a distinct blue colour; this colour seen in some comets is usually a result of the emission of carbon monoxide ions. It was also notable for uniquely being visible at the same time (mid October 1911) and in the same part of the sky as a second bright comet; this was C/1911 S3 (Beljawsky), which reached the first magnitude, had a fifteen degree tail and a bright golden-yellow appearance.
