= C/1900 O1 (Borrelly–Brooks) =

Parabolic comet

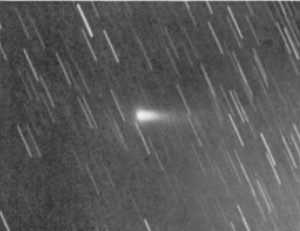
- Comet Borrelly–Brooks photographed by H. K. Palmer on 31 July 1900

Discovery
- Discovered by: Alphonse Borrelly; William R. Brooks
- Discovery date: 23 July 1900

Designations
- Alternative designations: 1900 II, 1900b

Orbital characteristics
- Epoch: 15 August 1900 (JD 2415246.5)
- Observation arc: 94 days
- Number of observations: 121
- Perihelion: 1.015 AU
- Eccentricity: 1.00032
- Orbital period: ~66,000 years (inbound)
- Inclination: 62.533°
- Longitude of ascending node: 329.41°
- Argument of periapsis: 12.423°
- Last perihelion: 3 August 1900
- Earth MOID: 0.0154 AU
- Jupiter MOID: 3.0621 AU

Physical characteristics
- Mean radius: 0.598 km (0.372 mi) (Note: Calculated mean radius using the formula: $\log_{10}\,(\,R\,)\ =\;0.9 +\;0.13 (\,H\,)$ Where $\,H\,$ is the comet's absolute total magnitude (M1))
- Comet total magnitude (M1): 8.64
- Apparent magnitude: 5.0 (1900 apparition)

Comet Borrelly–Brooks, formal designation C/1900 O1, is a non-periodic comet that was seen throughout the latter half of 1900.

== Discovery and observations ==
French astronomer Alphonse Borrelly was the first person to discover the comet on the early morning of 24 July 1900, while William Robert Brooks independently spotted the same comet about 15 minutes later. They reported the comet as a 9th-magnitude object with a short tail located within the constellation Aries. (Note: Reported initial position upon discovery was: α = 2^{h} 43.3^{m} , δ = 11° 51′) A day later, H. K. Palmer started to take a series of photographs of the comet itself for the remainder of the month.

Robert G. Aitken was the last astronomer to observe Comet Borrelly–Brooks as it faded to a 15th-magnitude object within the constellation Ursa Minor on 23 December 1900.

== Orbit ==
Charles D. Perrine and others calculated the first parabolic trajectory of the comet, concluding that it reached perihelion on 3 August 1900. In 1903, Manuel de Simas later revised it to a hyperbolic trajectory. J. M. Poor found that the comet had accelerated during its inbound flight to the Sun in 1900, with Brian G. Marsden and Ichiro Hasegawa later calculating this original trajectory had an orbital period of 66,000 years before it was ejected from the Solar System.

A 2022 study calculated that Borrelly–Brooks has a minimum orbit intersection distance of approximately 0.045 AU (6.7 million km) with 225088 Gonggong.

== Possible meteor shower ==
Due to the comet's very small minimum orbit intersection distance with Earth, around 0.015 AU (2.2 million km) away, it is theorized that this comet is a potential parent body of a meteor shower that should appear 21 August of each year from a radiant in the direction of the constellation Hydrus. However, no associated meteor shower has yet been found.
