= Edgar Frisby =

British-American mathematician and astronomer (1837–1927)

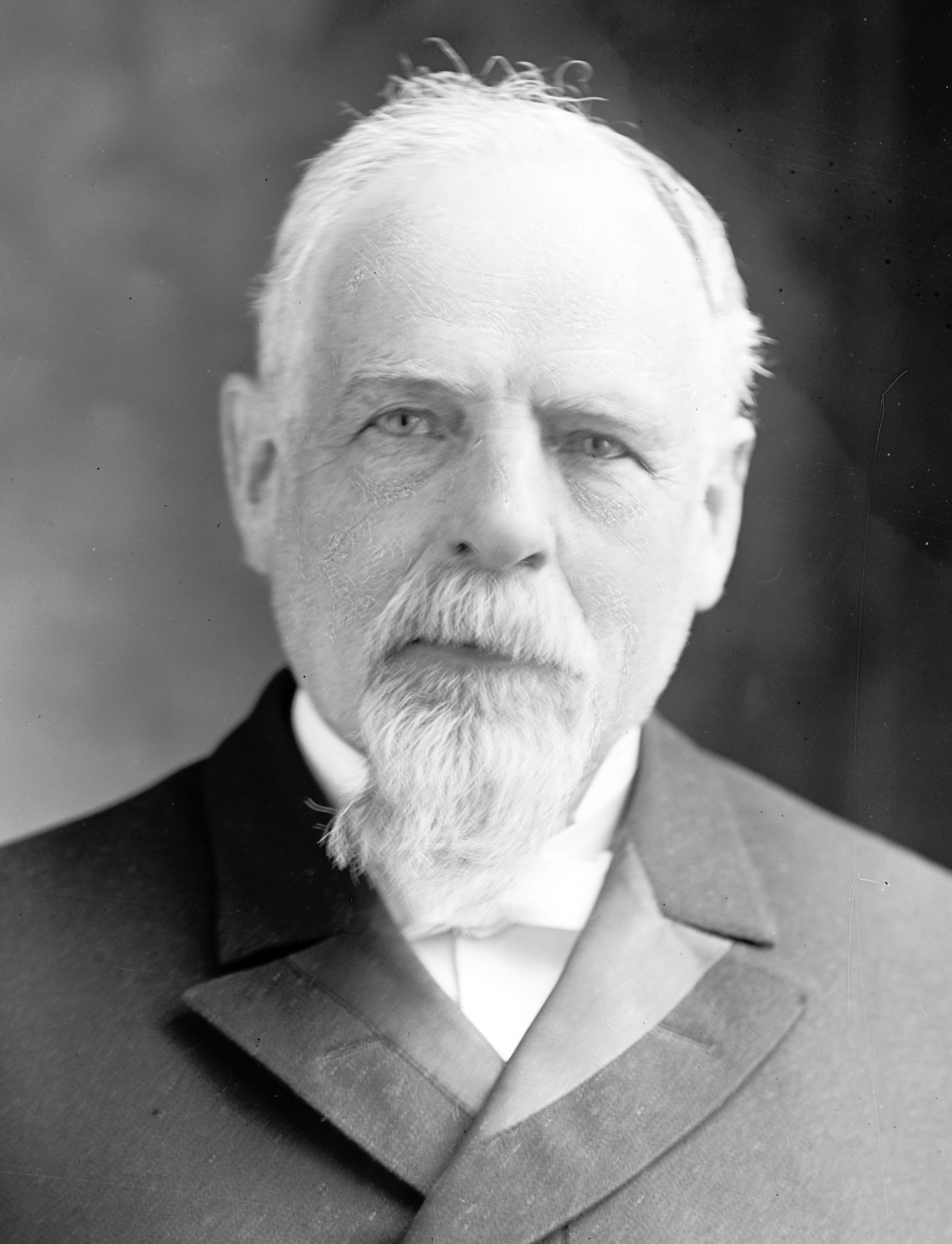
- Born: May 22, 1837; Great Easton, Leicestershire, England
- Died: 1927 (age ca. 90)
- Scientific career
- Fields: Astronomy
- Workplaces: Northwestern University; United States Naval Observatory; United States Navy

Edgar Frisby (May 22, 1837– 1927) was an American astronomer, born at Great Easton, Leicestershire, England. He graduated from the University of Toronto in 1863 (M.A., 1864), then taught in the Province of Canada in 1863–67.

He taught for a short time as professor of mathematics at Northwestern University before accepting a position at the United States Naval Observatory, Washington, D.C. He served as assistant astronomer from 1868 to 1878. Following that, he taught as professor of mathematics in the United States Navy from 1878 until he retired in 1899. Professor Frisby observed several eclipses for the government, computed the orbit of the comet of 1882, and had charge of the 12-inch equatorial telescope until his retirement.
