= C/1911 S2 (Quénisset) =

Non-periodic comet

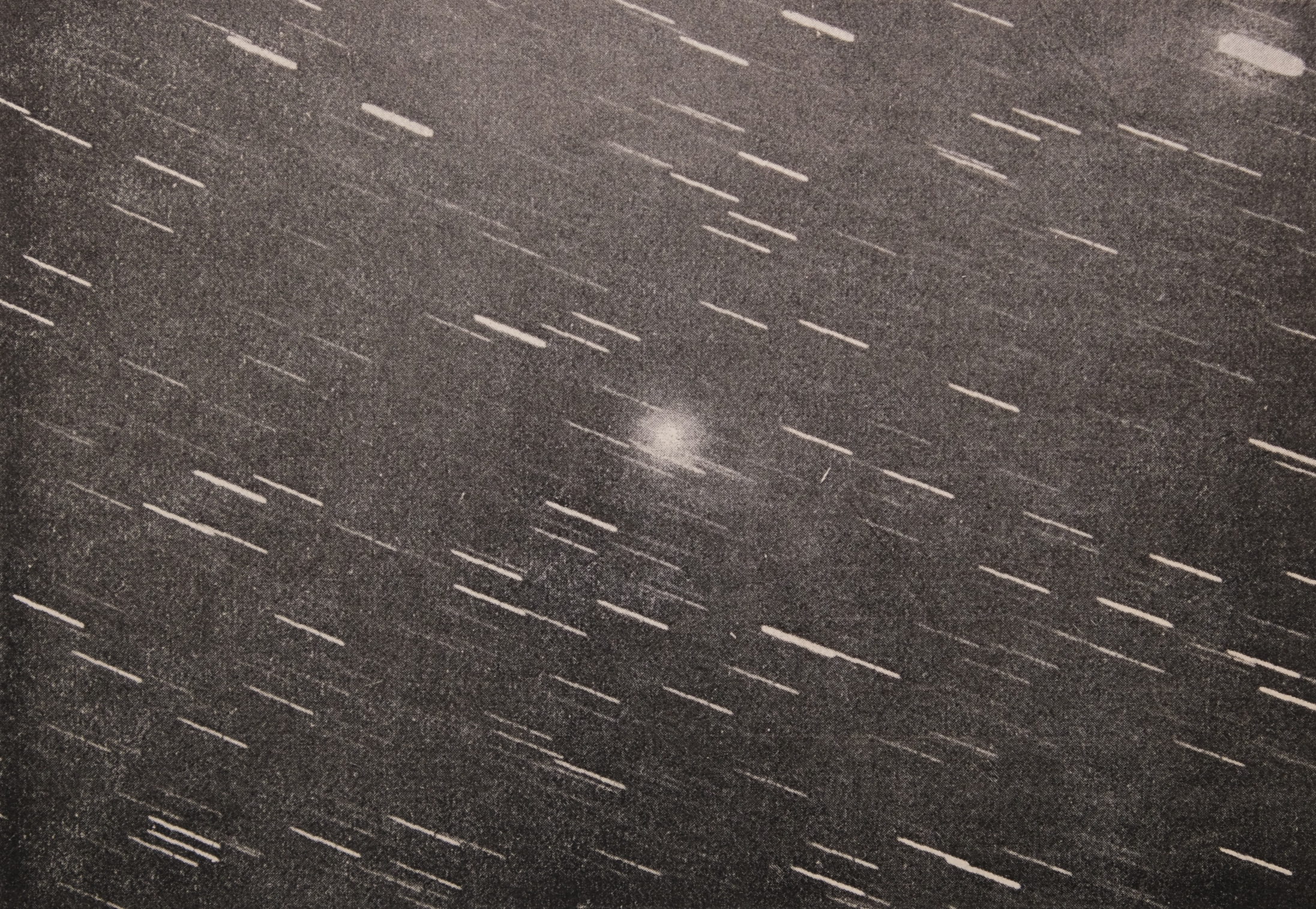
- Comet Quénisset photographed from Juvisy-sur-Orge, France on 24 September 1911

Discovery
- Discovered by: Ferdinand Quénisset
- Discovery site: Flammarion Obs, France
- Discovery date: 23 September 1911

Designations
- Alternative designations: 1911f 1911 VI

Orbital characteristics
- Epoch: 25 October 1911 (JD 2419334.5)
- Observation arc: 30 days
- Number of observations: 9
- Aphelion: 517.6 AU
- Perihelion: 0.787 AU
- Semi-major axis: 259.2 AU
- Eccentricity: 0.78735
- Orbital period: ~4,170 years
- Inclination: 108.09°
- Longitude of ascending node: 36.430°
- Argument of periapsis: 122.09°
- Last perihelion: 12 November 1911
- Earth MOID: 0.0172 AU
- Jupiter MOID: 0.7418 AU

Comet Quénisset, also known by its modern formal designation C/1911 S2, is a non-periodic comet that has a 4,000-year retrograde orbit around the Sun. It is the second of two comets discovered by French astronomer, Ferdinand Quénisset.

== Potential meteor shower ==
Orbital calculations by J. B. Dale revealed that although there would be no close encounter between the comet and the Earth, the former's descending node resulted in a minimum orbit intersection distance of about 0.0172 AU (2.57 million km) by 16 December 1911. This has led to other scientists predicting a meteor shower originating from this comet that will be coming from the constellation Vulpecula on 27 April of each year, though none has been observed so far.
