= 16P/Brooks =

Jupiter-family comet

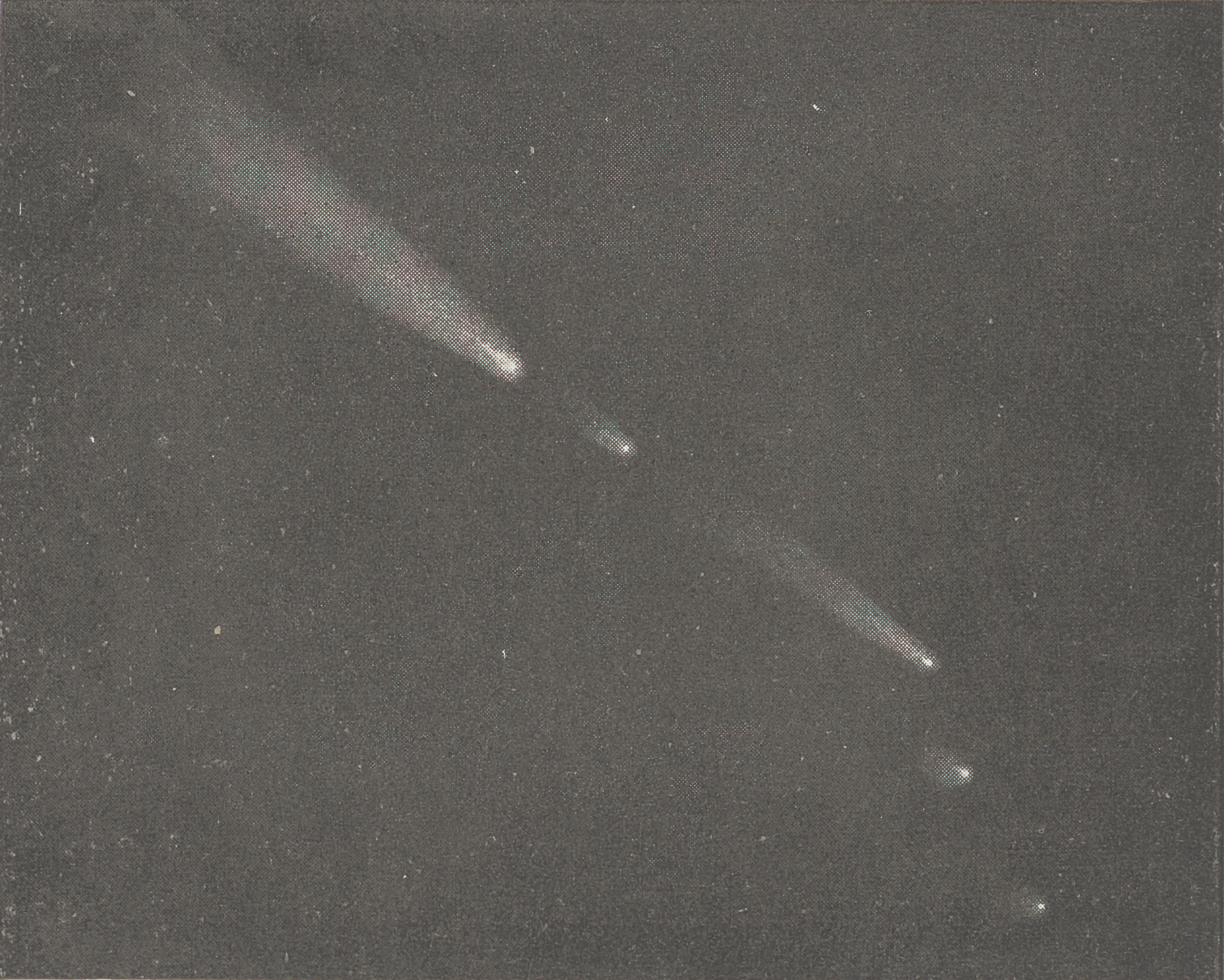
- Sketch of the fragmentation of Comet Brooks 2 on 4 August 1889

Discovery
- Discovered by: William Robert Brooks
- Discovery site: Geneva, New York
- Discovery date: 7 July 1889

Designations
- MPC designation: P/1889 N1, P/1896 M1
- Alternative designations: Brooks 2; 1889 V, 1896 VI; 1903 V, 1911 I, 1925 IX; 1932 VIII, 1939 VII; 1946 IV, 1953 V; 1960 VI, 1974 I; 1980 IX, 1987 XXIV; 1994 XXIII

Orbital characteristics
- Epoch: 21 November 2025 (JD 2461000.5)
- Observation arc: 132.56 years
- Number of observations: 922
- Aphelion: 5.440 AU
- Perihelion: 1.885 AU
- Semi-major axis: 3.663 AU
- Eccentricity: 0.48453
- Orbital period: 7.009 years
- Max. orbital speed: 40 km/s (25 mi/s); (1886 Jupiter approach); 26 km/s (16 mi/s); (2028 perihelion)
- Inclination: 3.009°
- Longitude of ascending node: 138.82°
- Argument of periapsis: 245.38°
- Mean anomaly: 235.96°
- Last perihelion: 18 April 2021
- Next perihelion: 21 April 2028
- T_{Jupiter}: 2.863
- Earth MOID: 0.459 AU
- Jupiter MOID: 0.209 AU

Physical characteristics
- Mean radius: 1.59 km (0.99 mi)
- Comet total magnitude (M1): 12.2
- Comet nuclear magnitude (M2): 15.6

16P/Brooks, also known as Brooks 2, is a Jupiter-family comet discovered by William Robert Brooks on 7 July 1889, but failed to note any motion. He was able to confirm the discovery the next morning, having seen that the comet had moved north. On 1 August 1889, the famous comet hunter Edward Emerson Barnard discovered two fragments of the comet labeled "B" and "C" located 1 and 4.5 arc minutes away. On 2 August he found another four or five, but these were no longer visible the next day. On August 4, he observed two more objects, labeled "D" and "E". "E" disappeared by the next night and "D" was gone by the next week. Around mid-month, "B" grew large and faint, finally disappearing at the beginning of September. "C" managed to survive until mid-November 1889. The apparition ended on 13 January 1891. After the discovery apparition, the comet has always been over two magnitudes fainter.

== 1886 ==
The comet's breakup is believed to have been caused by the passage of the comet within Jupiter's Roche limit around 20 July 1886, (Note: Jupiter came to aphelion (farthest distance from the Sun) one month later on 1886-Aug-21 at 5.4568 AU.) when it spent two days within the orbit of Io. (Note: Io orbits 0.0028 AU (420 thousand km) from Jupiter.)

16P/Brooks 2 best-fit Jupiter approach around 1886-Jul-20
Date & time of closest approach	Jupiter distance (AU)	Sun distance (AU)	Velocity wrt Jupiter (km/s)	Velocity wrt Sun (km/s)	Reference
1886-Jul-20 22:32	0.001 AU (150 thousand km; 93 thousand mi; 0.39 LD)	5.457 AU (816 million km; 507 million mi)	41.1	40.1	Horizons

The very close approach to Jupiter in 1886 resulted in the previous perihelion distance becoming the new aphelion distance.

Orbital Elements for 1865 + 1889
Epoch	Aphelion (AD)	Perihelion (QR)	Period
1865	14 AU (Note: 16P/Brooks came to aphelion (farthest distance from the Sun) around 1870 at ≈14.3 AU.)	5.5 AU	31 years
1889	5.4 AU	1.95 AU	7 years

On 31 December 2016 the comet passed 0.333 AU (49.8 million km) from Jupiter and on 5 July 2053 ± 3 days it will pass about 0.26 AU (39 million km) from Jupiter.

== Notes ==
Numbered comets
Previous; 15P/Finlay	16P/Brooks	Next; 17P/Holmes
