= 12P/Pons–Brooks =

Halley-type comet

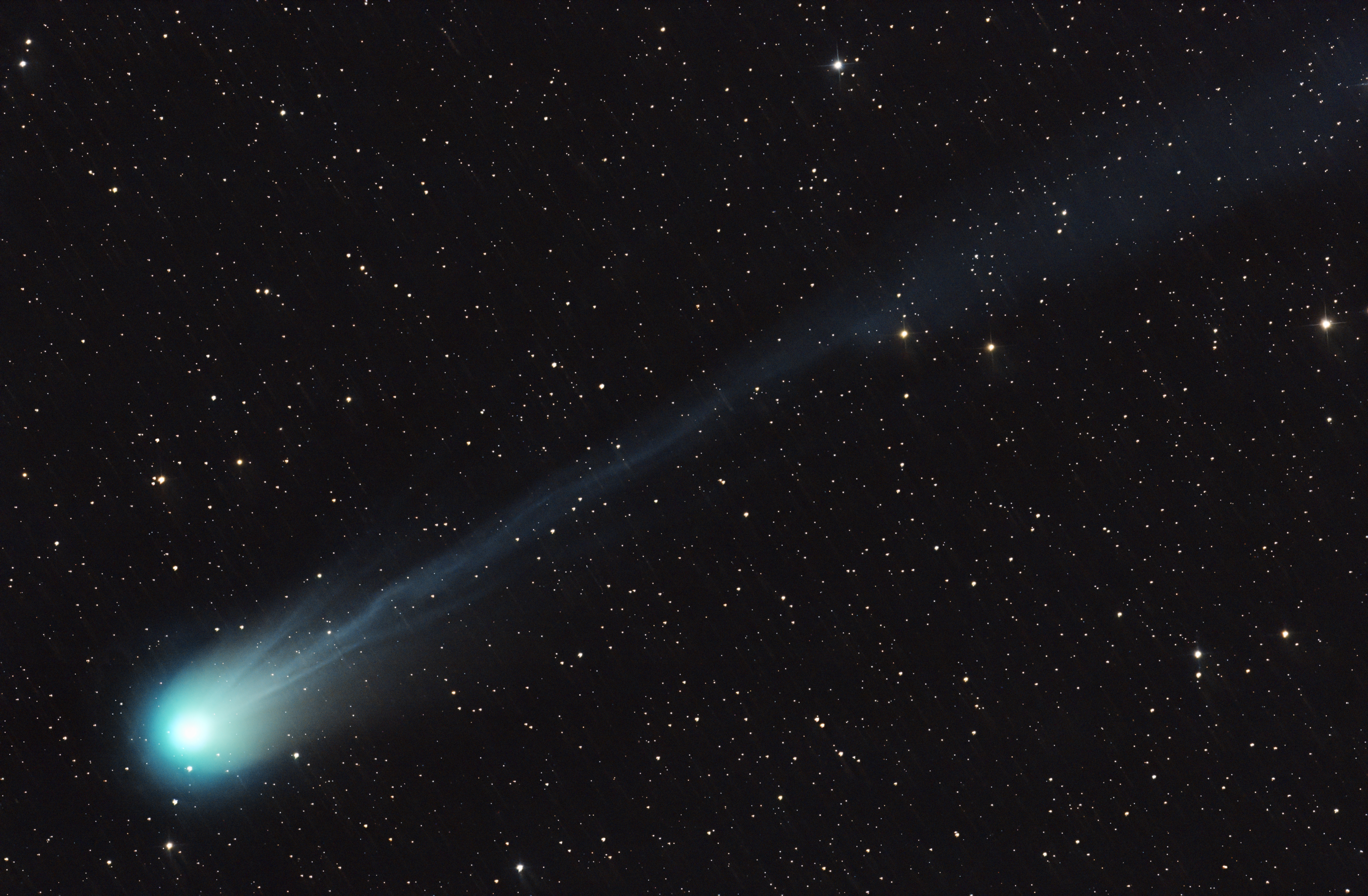
- 12P/Pons–Brooks photographed on 7 March 2024

Discovery
- Discovered by: Jean-Louis Pons; William Robert Brooks
- Discovery date: 12 July 1812

Designations
- MPC designation: X/245?; C/1385 U1; C/1457 A1; P/1812 O1; P/1883 R1; P/1953 M1
- Alternative designations: 1812 I, 1884 I, 1954 VII; 1883b, 1953c

Orbital characteristics
- Epoch: 5 May 2025 (JD 2460800.5)
- Observation arc: 640–1,780 years (Note: Observation arc from the Minor Planet Center database only covered dates from 1 October 1883 until 7 June 2025 (141.68 years). The entire arc up to October 1385 is about 640 years, and if the 245 AD apparition is confirmed to be Pons–Brooks, it will stretch out to at least 1,780 years.)
- Earliest precovery date: September 245 AD?; October 1385
- Number of observations: 8,340
- Aphelion: 33.669 AU
- Perihelion: 0.781 AU
- Semi-major axis: 17.225 AU
- Eccentricity: 0.95466
- Orbital period: 71.491 years
- Inclination: 74.190°
- Longitude of ascending node: 255.86°
- Argument of periapsis: 199.01°
- Mean anomaly: 5.223°
- Last perihelion: 21 April 2024 (Note: JPL Horizons ephemeris generated by JPL K242/30 (soln.date: 2023-Jul-29) has 12P/Pons–Brooks coming to perihelion at 2024-Apr-21 03:16 which is about 2 hours later than "Kinoshita's 2003 solution". of 00:55. The Minor Planet Center's unperturbed two-body solution (epoch 2024-05-10) gives a less accurate date of 2024-04-20.47. JPL SBDB (using epoch "2010".) gives an even less accurate unperturbed date of 2024-Apr-19.89. See table.)
- Next perihelion: 15 August 2095
- T_{Jupiter}: 0.598
- Earth MOID: 0.180 AU
- Jupiter MOID: 2.018 AU

Physical characteristics
- Dimensions: 34±12 km (upper limit); 2.2 km (lower limit)
- Synodic rotation period: 57±1.0 hours
- Spectral type: (B–R) = 0.9±0.1; (V–R) = 0.47±0.05
- Comet total magnitude (M1): 5.0
- Comet nuclear magnitude (M2): 11.0

Comet Pons–Brooks is a periodic comet with an orbital period of 71 years. Comets with an orbital period of 20–200 years are referred to as Halley-type comets. It is one of the brightest-known periodic comets, reaching an absolute visual magnitude of about 5 in its approach to perihelion. Comet Pons–Brooks was conclusively discovered at Marseilles Observatory in July 1812 by Jean-Louis Pons, and on its next appearance in 1883 by William Robert Brooks. However it has been confirmed 12P/Pons–Brooks was observed before the 19th century.

The last perihelion passage was 21 April 2024, with closest approach to Earth being 1.55 AU (232 million km) on 2 June 2024. During the 2024 apparition the comet brightened to a magnitude of 3.8.

== Observational history ==
=== Before 1812 ===
Comet Pons–Brooks has been identified as a comet observed in 1385 and in 1457. The 1385 apparition was very favourable and the comet was recorded by the Chinese in Ming Shilu and was also mentioned in some European sources. A comet observed by Paolo dal Pozzo Toscanelli in January 1457 and mentioned in Chinese sources is also identified as comet 12P/Pons–Brooks. In both apparitions the comet had magnitude 3 or brighter, not accounting for possible outbursts. It is possible that it was also a comet recorded in Chinese sources in September 245 CE.

So-Yeon Park and Jong-Chul Chae suggested that Pons–Brooks was also the comet recorded in Asian sources in 1313 and 1668. However, Maik Meyer argues that in the 1313 apparition, the comet would have been difficult to observe, being dim and close to the Sun, while the suggested position in Gemini contradicts the calculated location of comet Pons–Brooks in Aries. The March 1668 comet described by Koreans is probably the bright sungrazing comet observed by Europeans, whose orbit is no way compatible with that of comet 12P/Pons–Brooks.

=== 1812 discovery ===
Comet Pons–Brooks was discovered on 12 July 1812, by Jean-Louis Pons. Independently, this comet was later found by Vincent Wisniewski on 1 August, and Alexis Bouvard on 2 August the same year. The comet was spotted with the naked eye on 13 August and by the end of the month a tail measuring 2 degrees in length was reported. Shortly after its initial discovery it was found to have an orbital period of about 70 years with an error of about 5 years. Johann Franz Encke determined a definitive orbit with a period of 70.68 years. This orbit was used to generate an ephemeris for the 1883–1884 return.

=== 1883–84 ===
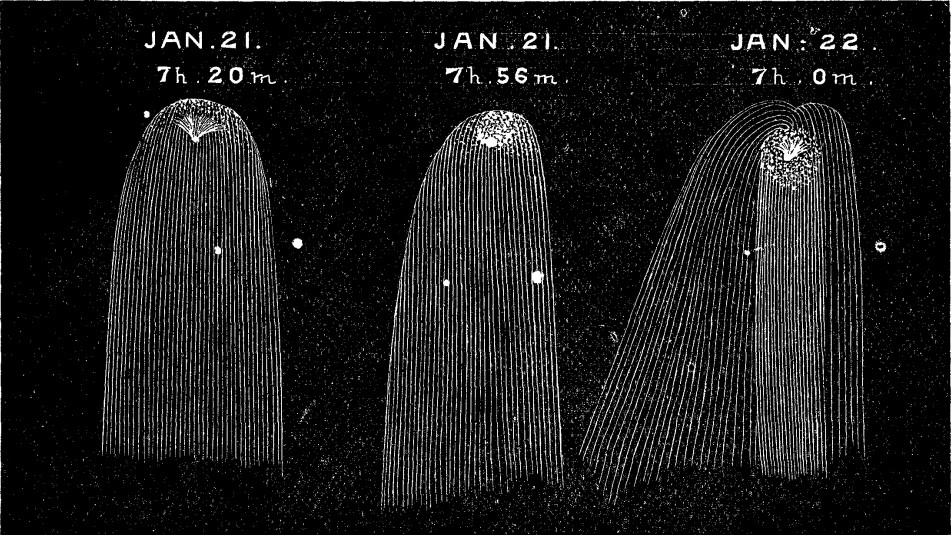
Sketches of comet 12P/Pons–Brooks from 21–22 January 1884

On 2 September 1883 a (faint) comet was accidentally discovered by William Robert Brooks and later identified with the comet of 1812. An outburst was observed on 21–23 September 1883, as the comet brightened from magnitude 10–11 to 8–8.5, and its appearance changed from diffuse to star-like.

The comet became visible with naked eye on 20 November and brightened up to magnitude 3. The comet was reported to have experienced outbursts on 1 January and 19 January. This year it traveled from Scheat and Markab in western Pegasus, 13 January 1884; southward (through Pisces) to reach perihelion below Iota and Beta Ceti (~α = 0^{h} , δ = –10°) around 24 January. It was last seen in June 1884.

=== 1954 ===
The comet was recovered on 20 June 1953 when it was 4.5 AU (670 million km) from the Sun. The comet outburst from magnitude 18 to magnitude 13 on 1 July 1953. Another outburst occurred in March 1954, the fourth observed in that apparition. On 23 April the comet was estimated magnitude 6.4, and its tail was half a degree long. Pons–Brooks came to perihelion on 22 May 1954 when it was 1.7 AU from Earth. After perihelion it became better visible from the south hemisphere. It was last observed on 4 September 1954 when it was 1.9 AU (280 million km) from the Sun. On 10 December 1954, the meteor stream of comet Pons–Brooks passed about 0.12 AU (18 million km) from Earth, resulting in potential meteors impacting Earth's atmosphere at relative velocity 45 km/s.

=== 2024 ===
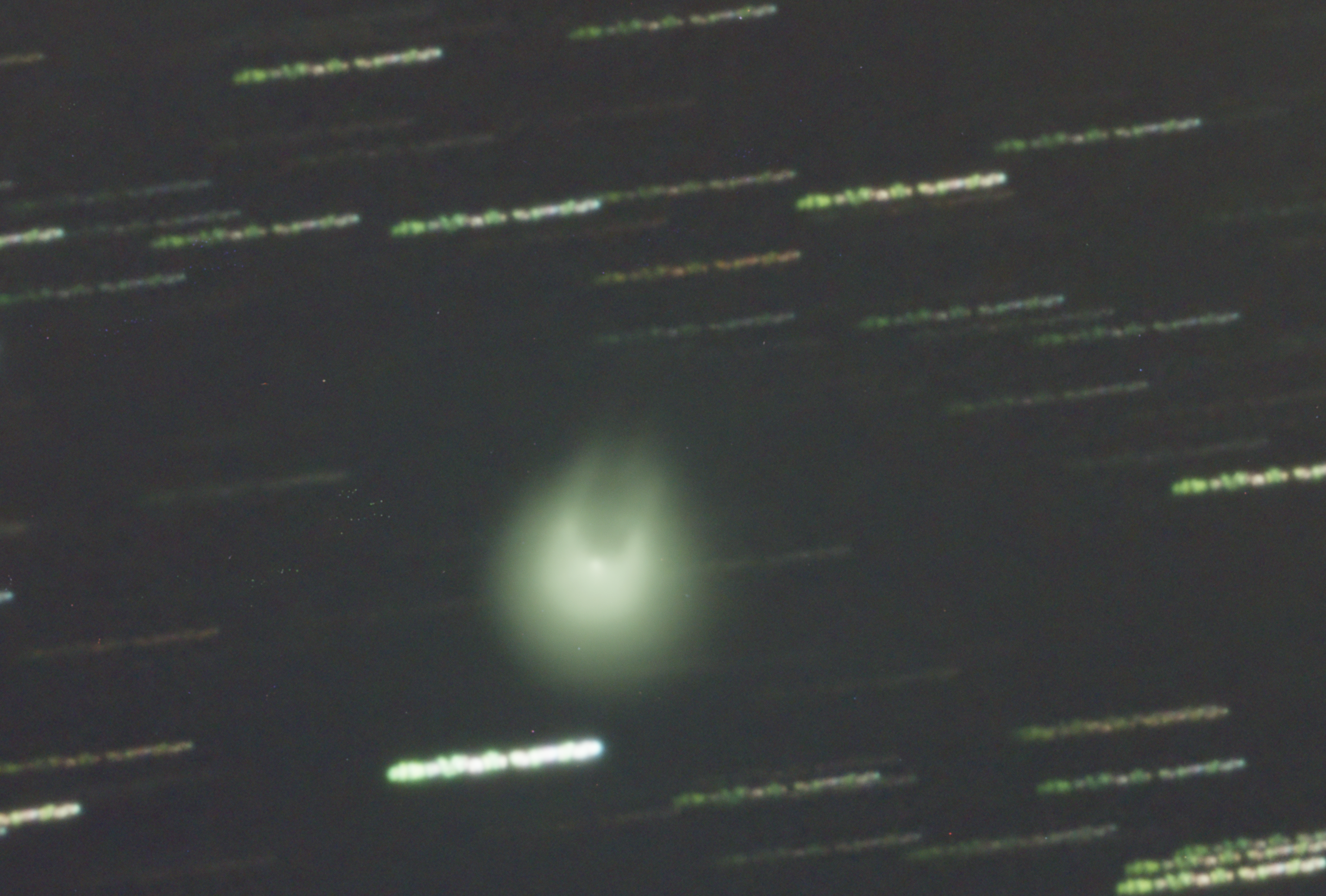
The comet on 27 July 2023, a week after its first outburst

On 10 June 2020 Pons–Brooks was recovered at apparent magnitude 23 by the Lowell Discovery Telescope when the comet was beyond the orbit of Saturn at 11.9 AU (1.78 billion km) from the Sun, with the uncertainty in the comet's heliocentric distance being roughly ± 10 000 km at the time. The comet underwent 14 well-documented outbursts, observed between 13 June 2023, and April 2024, at heliocentric distances ranging from 4.26 au to 0.85 au. After perihelion, two additional outbursts were observed in summer 2024, at heliocentric distances of 1.20 AU and 2.26 AU. The coma had expanded to a diameter of 600,000 km (370,000 mi) by 5 August, having an expansion rate of 220 m/s. Although initially spherical, the coma became asymmetrical due to the effects of radiation pressure on the dust. The comet outburst again on 5 October 2023 from magnitude 15 to magnitude 11 (brightening by ~40×). Two more outbursts were recorded on 1 November and 14 November, with the comet brightening to apparent magnitude 9.3 after the later. Outbursts were also observed on 14 December and 18 January 2024.

Outbursts (Note: When a comet increases its apparent magnitude with a difference between 2 and 5 magnitudes (equivalent to a brightening of 6–100 times) the event is called an Hughes, D. W. (1975). "outburst". Quarterly Journal of the Royal Astronomical Society. 16: 410. Bibcode:1975QJRAS..16..410H. One of the more extreme example of a cometary outburst is comet 17 P / Holmes' November 2007 brightening by about 15 magnitudes (nearly a millionfold), described in: Dyer, A. (15 November 2007). "Hubble zooms in on [the] heart of [a] mystery comet". hubblesite.org (Press release). Baltimore, MD: Space Telescope Science Institute. Release 2007-40.) during 2023
Date	Start mag	Outburst mag	Brightening	Sun distance (AU)	Solar elongation
2023-07-20	16	11	100×	3.9	101°
2023-10-05	15	11	40×	3.1	80°

By mid February the comet had brightened to magnitude 7.5 and had developed an ion tail about two degrees long that featured jets and filaments. A minor outburst took place on 29 February, with the comet brightening by 0.9 magnitudes. By 7 March the comet had brightened to magnitude 5.5 and was located about 10 degrees from the Andromeda Galaxy. In the following days the comet was reported to be visible by naked eye and featured a tail about 5 degrees long. Another outburst occurred on April 3, with the comet brightening to a magnitude of about 3.8. There was a solar eclipse on 8 April 2024 with the comet 25 degrees from the Sun.

The Thai National Radio Telescope successfully detected OH maser emissions from the comet in the 1665 and 1667 MHz by late March 2024, showing fluctuations in the water production as it neared perihelion, of which data from the SWAN instrument aboard SOHO revealed that it reached 1.7×10^{30} sec^{−1} at maximum on 14 April 2024. The perihelion passage was on 21 April 2024 at 0.781 AU (116.8 million km) from the Sun with a velocity with respect to the Sun of 47.1 km/s. The closest approach to Earth was 42 days later on 2 June 2024 when it was at a distance of 1.55 AU (232 million km). Near perihelion passage the comet was expected to brighten to about magnitude 4.5 (around 400× brighter than the July 2023 outburst). In early June Earth crossed the comet's orbital plane, resulting to an anti-tail becoming visible.

== Orbit ==
Earth close approach
Date	Distance (AU)	Solar elongation
1812-Sep-21	1.22 AU (183 million km)	40°
1884-Jan-09	0.63 AU (94 million km)	58°
1954-Jun-29	1.63 AU (244 million km)	38°
2024-Jun-02	1.55 AU (232 million km)	45°
2095-Aug-31	1.50 AU (224 million km)	32°

Libration is locked at a 1:6 resonance with Jupiter. The Tisserand invariant with respect to Jupiter (J) is 0.60. Aphelion (furthest point from the Sun) is just beyond the orbit of Neptune at 33.6 AU (5.03 billion km).

With a steep orbital inclination of 74.2° this comet does not spend a lot of time near the ecliptic. The Jet Propulsion Laboratory's (JPL) website shows that between the years 1900 and 2200, the comet made a relatively close approach with Saturn on 29 July 1957. At that point it passed within 1.6 AU (240 million km) of the giant planet's influence, though even this approach had negligible effect. The comet's orbit appears to be stable between 1740 and 2167, with no strong perturbations by any of the planets.

Before the 2020 recovery, while the last observation was in 1954, Kinoshita calculated that the comet would come to a future perihelion passage (closest approach to the Sun) on 10 August 2095. Accounting for observations in 2020–2023, the nominal time of perihelion passage is now calculated to be 15 August 2095.

Kirkwood in 1884 noticed that Pons–Brooks shares elements with 122P/de Vico. He suggested that the latter had calved off Pons–Brooks some centuries prior. Later he identified the two comets' capture into their elliptical orbits (or their parent body's capture) with their shared aphelion close to Neptune in 991 CE.

Other comets with a similar orbital period include 13P/Olbers, 23P/Brorsen–Metcalf, and 1P/Halley.

The orbital evolution of Pons–Brooks will remain stable in the next 100000 years, although there is a 0.5 percent probability that non-gravitational perturbations will cause the comet to transition into a retrograde orbit around the Sun, or even become a sungrazing comet, in the same timeframe.

== Physical characteristics ==
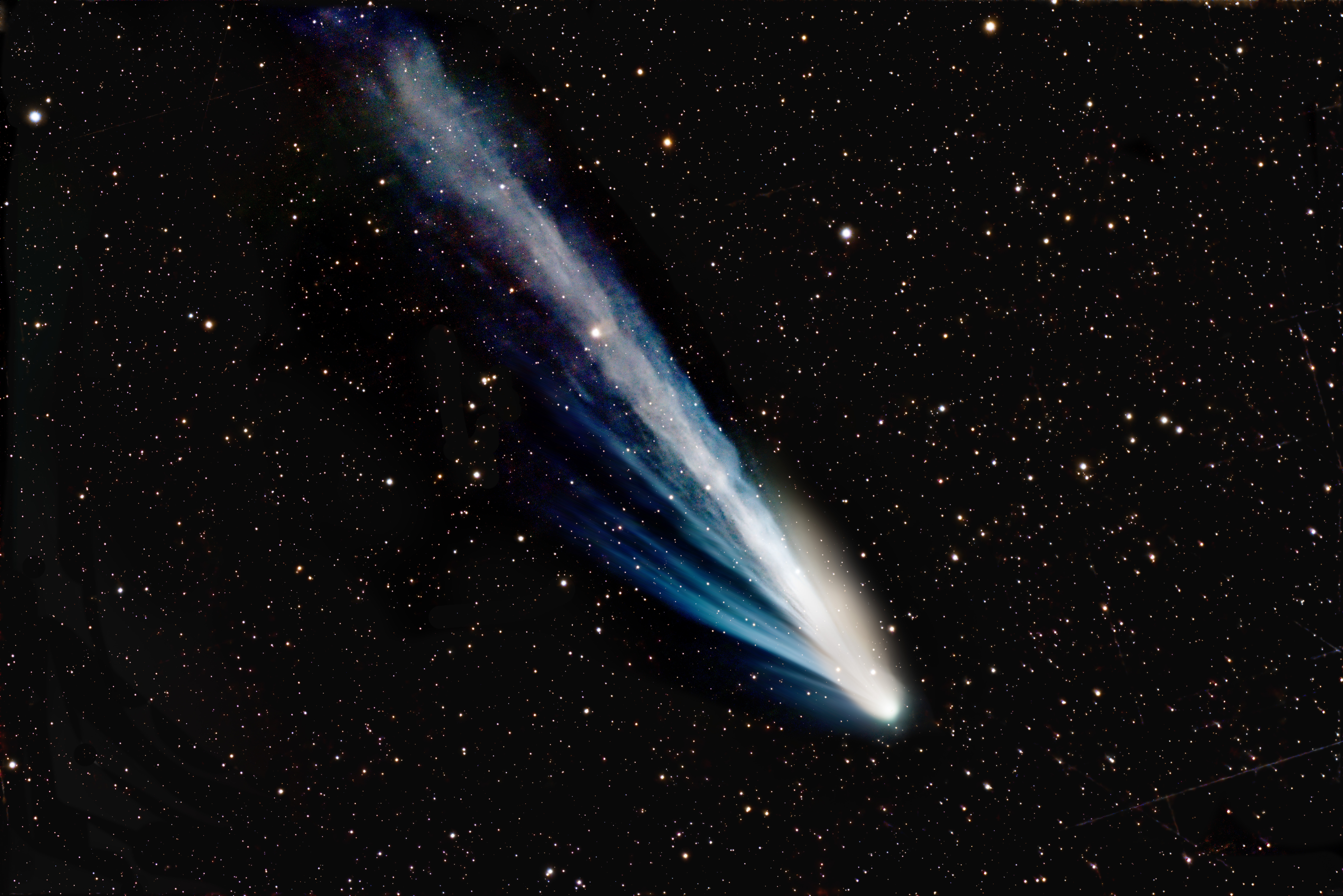
12P/Pons–Brooks on 6 April 2024

=== Nucleus size ===
Upon being recovered in 2020, Quanzhi Ye estimated that the nucleus of Pons–Brooks is around 17.0±6.0 km in radius, assuming a geometric albedo of 0.04 and an absolute magnitude of 13.4. This would make Pons–Brooks roughly half the size of Hale–Bopp, which is estimated to be 30 km (19 mi) in radius. However, the comet was already active at the time it was photometrically measured, thus this represents its upper limit instead.

David C. Jewitt later revised the nucleus radius to 5.6 km (3.5 mi), assuming that the outburst power was around 4.3×10^{10} watts, which corresponds to the solar energy absorbed by a hemisphere surface of 200 km^{2} (77 sq mi). Based on the water production rate, Li et al calculated a minimum active surface of 70 km^{2} (27 sq mi), which corresponds to a nuclear radius of 2.2 km (1.4 mi), which represents the lower limit for the nucleus size. Based on the various size estimates, the comet has a mass of around 2×10^{13} to 10^{16} kg, assuming a density of 500 kg/m^{3}.

Enhanced imaging revealed two active regions within an isotropic coma, which contributed to its distinctive "devil comet" appearance. Subsequent photometric analysis revealed no change in dust behaviour with no characteristic outburst observed.

=== Rotation period ===
Observations conducted at the Lowell Observatory between January and February 2024 revealed that the comet rotates once every 57±1.0 hours, which was based on the morphology of its coma activity. Analysis of CN jets from TRAPPIST resulted in a different value however, ranging from either 29.45 or 58.90 hours.

== Meteor showers ==
12P/Pons–Brooks is hypothesized to be the parent body of the weak December κ Draconids meteor shower (#336) that is active from about 29 November to 13 December and generates less than 2 meteors/hour. This is the most abundant of the meteor showers predicted to be related to the comet. One more nighttime meteor shower has been tentatively associated with 12P/Pons–Brooks, the northern June Aquilids, although most probably isn't the parent body. Comet Pons–Brooks could also be the source of a meteor shower on Venus, along with periodic comets 122P/de Vico and 27P/Crommelin.

== Bibliography ==
- Kronk, Gary W.; Meyer, Maik; Seargent, David A. J. (1999). Cometography: A Catalog of Comets. Vol. 1: Ancient–1799. Cambridge University Press. ISBN 978-0-521-58504-0.
- Kronk, Gary W.; Meyer, Maik; Seargent, David A. J. (2003). Cometography: A Catalog of Comets. Vol. 2: 1800–1899. Cambridge University Press. ISBN 978-0-521-58505-7.
- Kronk, Gary W.; Meyer, Maik; Seargent, David A. J. (2009). Cometography: A Catalog of Comets. Vol. 4: 1933–1959. Cambridge University Press. ISBN 978-0-521-58507-1.
- Peng-Yoke, H. (1964). "Natural phenomena recorded in the Đai-Viêt Su'-ky Toan-Thu', an early Annamese historical source". Journal of the American Oriental Society. 84 (2): 127–149. doi:10.2307/597100. JSTOR 597100.

Numbered comets
Previous; 11P/Tempel–Swift–LINEAR	12P/Pons–Brooks	Next; 13P/Olbers
