= Ferdinand Quénisset =

French astronomer (1872–1951)

Ferdinand Jules Quénisset
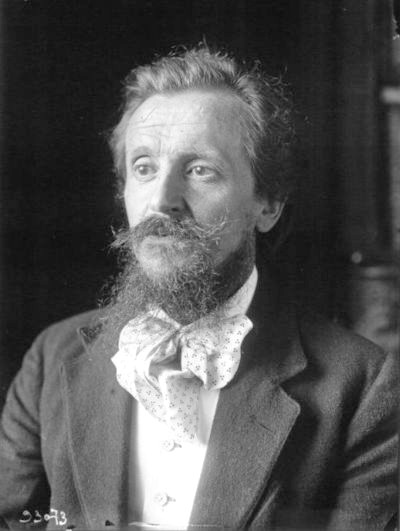
- Born: August 8, 1872; Paris, France
- Died: April 8, 1951 (aged 78); Juvisy-sur-Orge, France
- Occupation: Astronomer
- Years active: 1891-1947
- Known for: Astronomical photographs, Discovery of comets
- Notable work: Annuaire astronomique et météorologique Camille Flammarion

Ferdinand Jules Quénisset (1872–1951) was a French astronomer who specialized in astrophotography.

== Early life and career ==
Quénisset was born on 8 August 1872 in Paris, the son of Gatien Jules Quénisset, an assistant director of the Administration des Monnaies et Médailles in Paris, and Juliette Antonia Mallard, a dressmaker.

He became a member of the Société astronomique de France in 1890, after becoming interested in astronomy by reading Camille Flammarion's books. From 1891 to 1894, Quénisset served as member of the society's council as assistant librarian in the society's headquarters, which at the time was located at 28 rue Serpente in the 6th arrondissement of Paris.

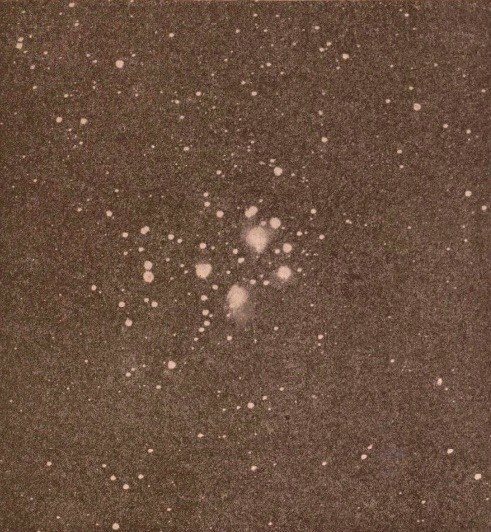
The Pleiades cluster. Photo by Ferdinand Quénisset. 1907

Quénisset worked as an observer at Flammarion's observatory in Juvisy-sur-Orge from 1891 to 1893, during which time he discovered a comet. He was forced to abandon astronomy for a dozen years while he performed his military service, but then returned to Juvisy in 1906 to resume his post at the observatory (he succeeded Eugène Antoniadi, who had left Juvisy in 1902).

Quénisset worked at the Juvisy observatory for the remainder of his career until 1947, when his health obliged him to quit.

He was a member of the International Union for Cooperation in Solar Research in 1913.

He was a member of the International Astronomical Union and participated in Commissions 15 (Physical Study of Comets & Minor Planets) and 16 (Physical Study of Planets & Satellites).

Quénisset died on 8 April 1951 and is buried in the new cemetery of Juvisy.

== Scientific achievements ==
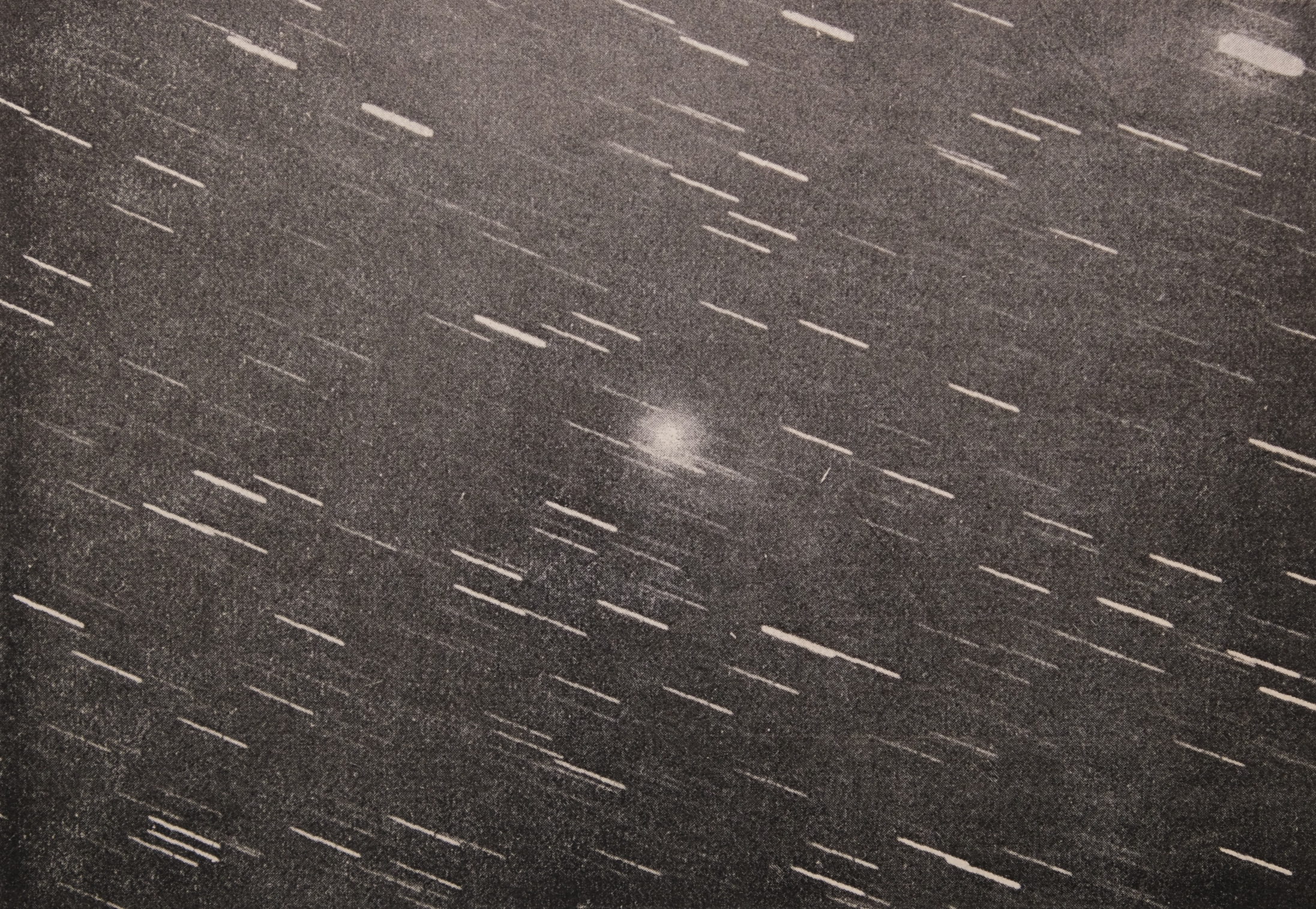
C/1911 S2 (Quénisset)

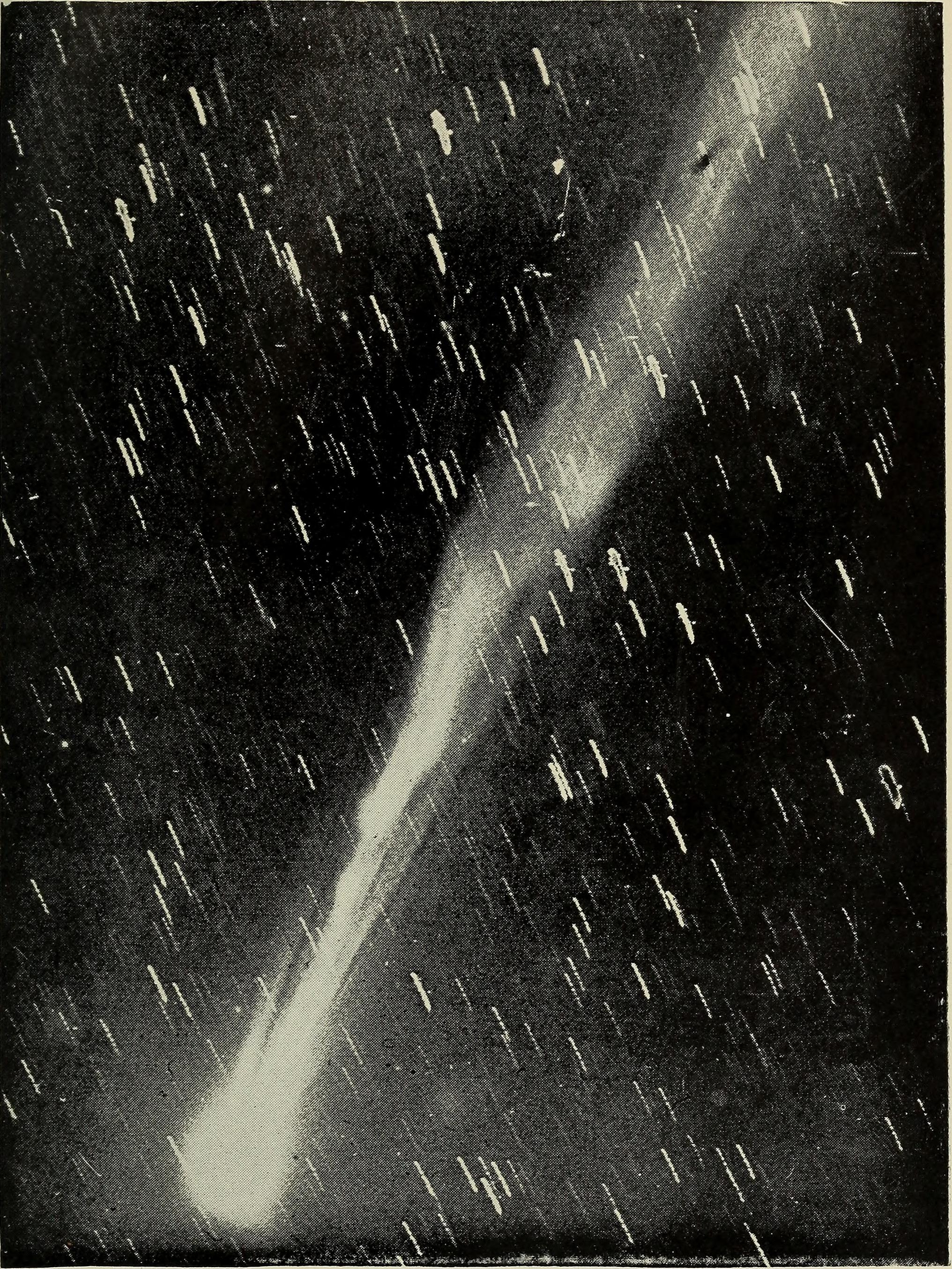
C/1893 N1 (Rordame–Quénisset)

- Co-discovered comet C/1893 N1 (Rordame–Quenisset) on 9 January 1893.
- First in France to photograph zodiacal light in 1902.
- Discovered comet C/1911 S2 (Quenisset) on 23 September 1911.
- First to photograph details of the atmosphere of Venus in 1911.
- Took nearly 6,000 astronomical photographs and more than 1,500 meteorological photographs [as of 1932], many of which were published in the Bulletin of the Société astronomique de France, the Comptes Rendus des séances de l’Académie des sciences, and other scientific publications. His most noteworthy meteorological photographs were published as individual plates in the book Les Nuages et les Systèmes nuageux. Quénisset also made numerous drawings of Venus, Mars, Jupiter and the Moon.
- First to successfully record Mercury's albedo features photographically.
- First in France to photograph Pluto, in Spring and Autumn 1930.
- Delivered numerous conferences on astronomy in France (Paris, Versailles, Le Havre, Saint-Quentin, Tours, Lille, Crépy-en-Valois) and in other countries (Belgium, Switzerland).

== Awards and honors ==
- 1899 - Prix des Dames from the Société Astronomique de France.
- 1901 - Officier d'académie by decree of the Ministre de l'instruction publique et des beaux-arts of 12 April 1901.
- 1911 - Donohoe Comet-Medal (Seventy-Second) from the Astronomical Society of the Pacific, for his discovery of the comet C/1911 S2 (Quenisset) on 23 September 1911.
- 1923 - Honorary member of the Société astronomique Flammarion de Genève, for his contribution to the establishment of that association.
- 1926 - Médaille Commémorative from the Société Astronomique de France.
- 1932 - Chevalier of the Légion d'honneur on 29 December 1932.
- 1933 - First Prize in the Concours photographie de nuages (Cloud Photography Competition) of the Office National Météorologique.
- 1934 - Valz Prize from the French Academy of Sciences for his observations of comets.
- 1938 - Prix Gabrielle et Camille Flammarion from the Société Astronomique de France.
- 1945 - Prix Dorothéa Klumpke-Isaac Roberts from the Société Astronomique de France.
- 1973 - Quenisset impact crater on Mars named in his honor by the International Astronomical Union (IAU).
- 2022 - Asteroid 423645 Quénisset named in his honor by the IAU.

== Publications ==
=== Author ===
- Les phototypes sur papier au gélatinobromure (Paris: Gauthier-Villars, 1901).
- Applications de la photographie à la physique et à la météorologie (Paris: Charles Mendel, 1901).OCLC 862997866
- Manuel pratique de photographie astronomique à l'usage des amateurs photographes (Paris: Charles Mendel, 1903). OCLC 30058364
- Instruction pour la photographie des nuages (Paris: Office National de Météorologie, 1923), OCLC 473673890.
- Annuaire astronomique et météorologique Camille Flammarion (Paris: Flammarion (impr. de Jouve), 1937–1951).

=== Contributor ===
- Cours de météorologie à l'usage des candidats au brevet de météorologiste militaire. 2ème Partie, Les Nuages et les Systèmes nuageux: Planches (Paris : Office national météorologique de France, 1926).
- Atlas international des nuages et des types de ciels. I. Atlas général (Paris : Office National Météorologique de France, 1939).
