= Randolph Township =

Randolph Township may refer to:

== Arkansas ==
- Randolph Township, Desha County, Arkansas, in Desha County, Arkansas

== Illinois ==
- Randolph Township, McLean County, Illinois

== Indiana ==
- Randolph Township, Ohio County, Indiana
- Randolph Township, Tippecanoe County, Indiana

== Minnesota ==
- Randolph Township, Dakota County, Minnesota

== Missouri ==
- Randolph Township, St. Francois County, Missouri

== New Jersey ==
- Randolph Township, New Jersey

== North Dakota ==
- Randolph Township, McKenzie County, North Dakota, in McKenzie County, North Dakota

== Ohio ==
- Randolph Township, Montgomery County, Ohio, now part of the city of Clayton
- Randolph Township, Portage County, Ohio

== Pennsylvania ==
- Randolph Township, Pennsylvania
