= Smith Observatory and Dr. William R. Brooks House =

Historic house in New York, United States

- U.S. National Register of Historic Places
- Location within New York Location within the United States
- Location: 618-620 Castle Street, Geneva, New York
- Coordinates: 42°52′16″N 76°59′25″W
- Area: less than one acre
- Built: 1888
- NRHP reference No.: 08000275
- Added to NRHP: April 11, 2008

Smith Observatory and Dr. William R. Brooks House is a historic home and observatory located at Geneva in Ontario County, New York. Both structures were built in 1888. The observatory is a small frame building consisting of a two-story tower flanked by two small wings. The tower contains a 10-inch refracting telescope by Warner & Swasey of Cleveland, Ohio. The east wing contains an intact meridian transit telescope and sidereal pendulum clock. The house is a two-story brick dwelling with a broad range of intact, late Victorian eclectic features. Brooks was a Professor of Astronomy at Hobart College, which owned the observatory until the late 20th century.

It was listed on the National Register of Historic Places in 2008.

== See also ==
- List of astronomical observatories
