= William Robert Brooks =

American astronomer (1844–1921)

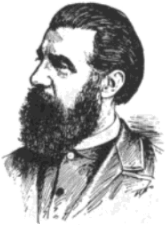

Personal details
- Born: June 11, 1844 Maidstone, England
- Died: May 3, 1921 (aged 76) Geneva, New York, United States
- Spouse: Mary E. Smith (m. 1870)
- Occupation: Astronomer

William Robert Brooks (June 11, 1844 – May 3, 1921) was a British-born American astronomer, mainly noted as being one of the most prolific discoverers of new comets of all time, second only to Jean-Louis Pons.

== Early life ==
William Robert Brooks was born in Maidstone, England, the son of Caroline (née Wickings) and William Brooks, a Baptist minister who emigrated to Marion, New York. He developed his interest in astronomy during a boyhood voyage to Australia, when he observed a navigator making measurements with a sextant. The following year, he built his very first telescope at the age of 14. Using his own diagrams and sketches, Brooks gave his first public lecture at the age of 17 at his fathers church. As a young man he worked in the Shepherd Iron Works in Buffalo, New York, gaining considerable mechanical and draughtsmanship skills: he went on to become a portrait photographer in Phelps before turning his attention to astronomy full-time. Brooks had a good knowledge of lens construction, and was able to design and make his own telescopes, taking years to grind and polish the necessary lenses and reflectors.

== Comet discoveries ==
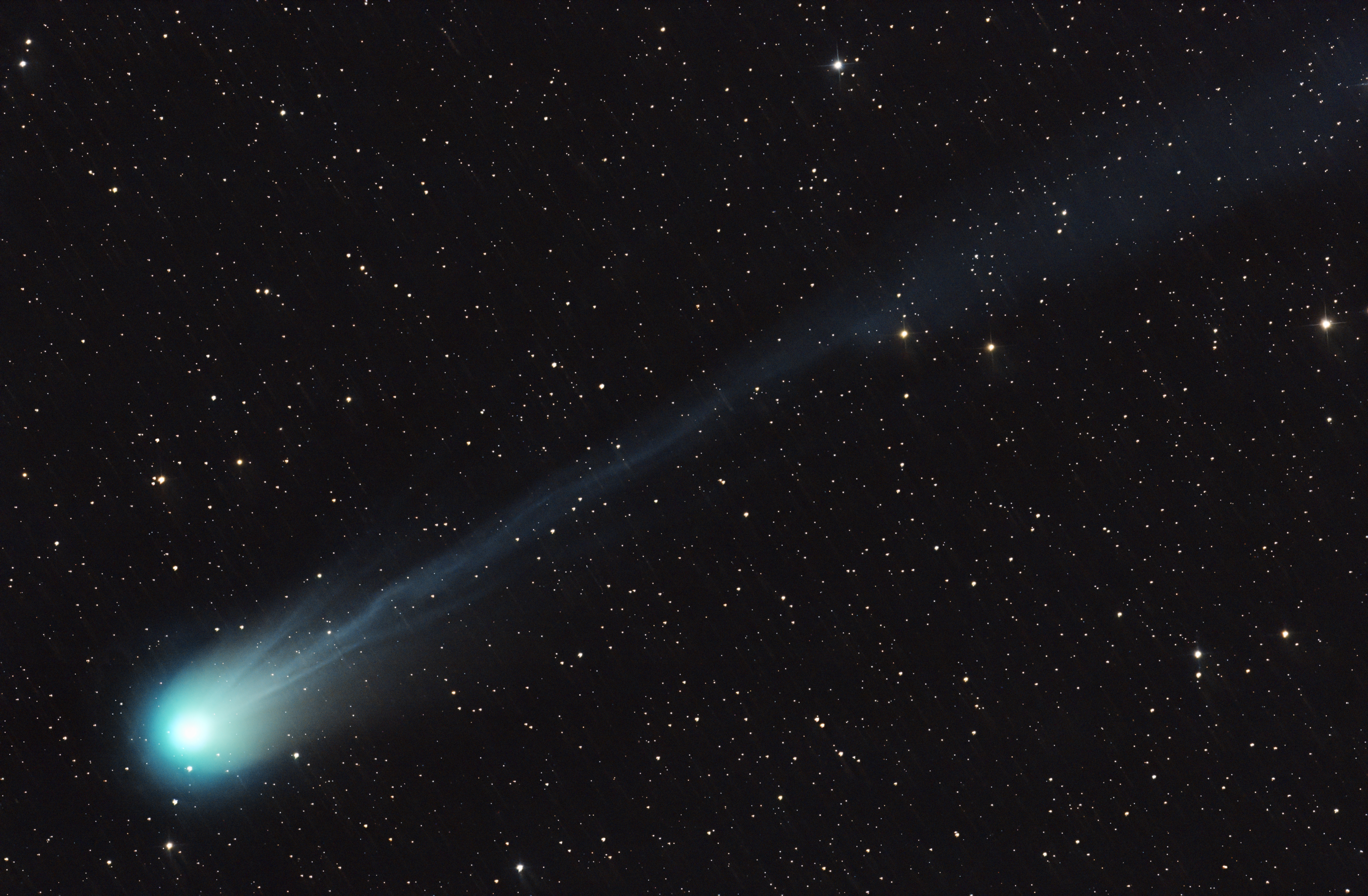
12P/Pons–Brooks

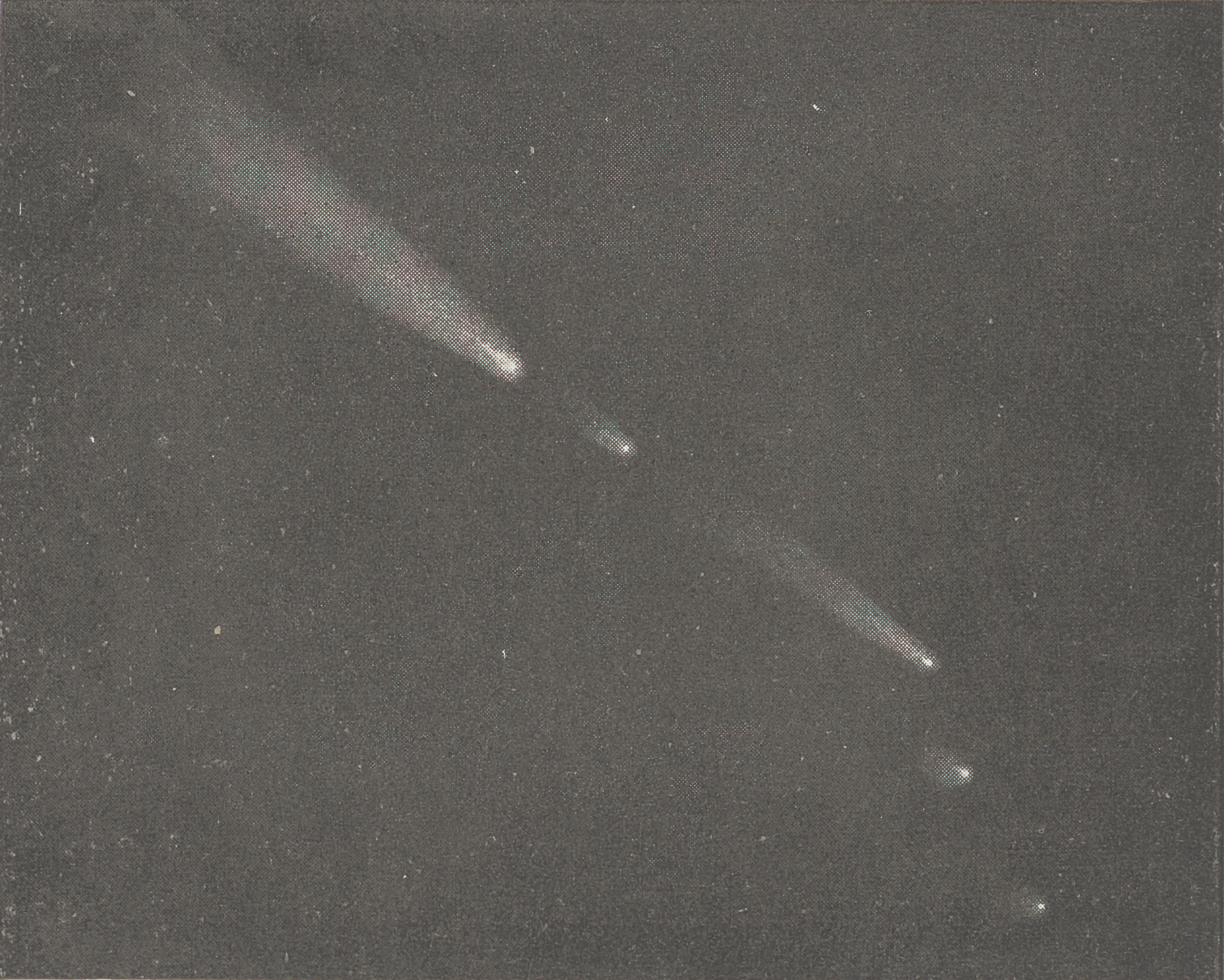
16P/Brooks

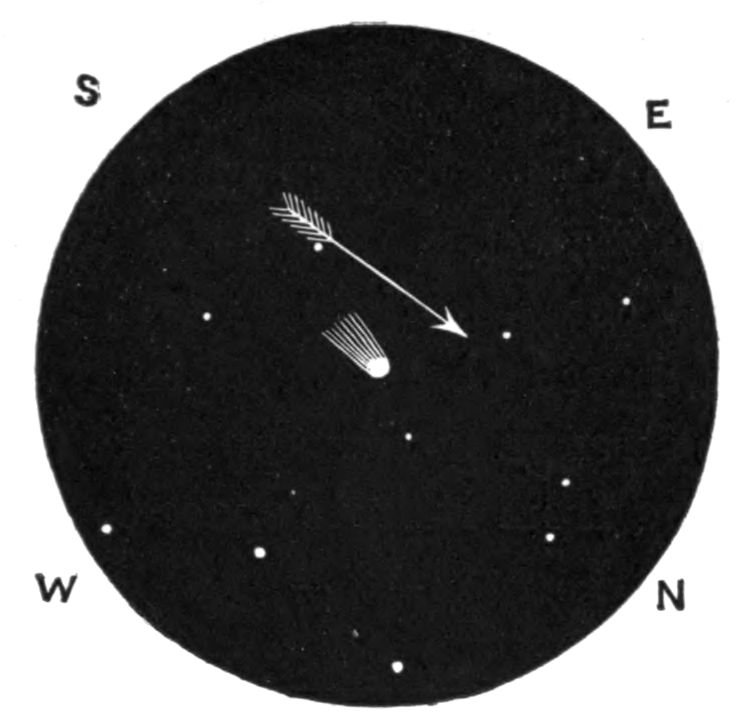
C/1890 F1 (Brooks)

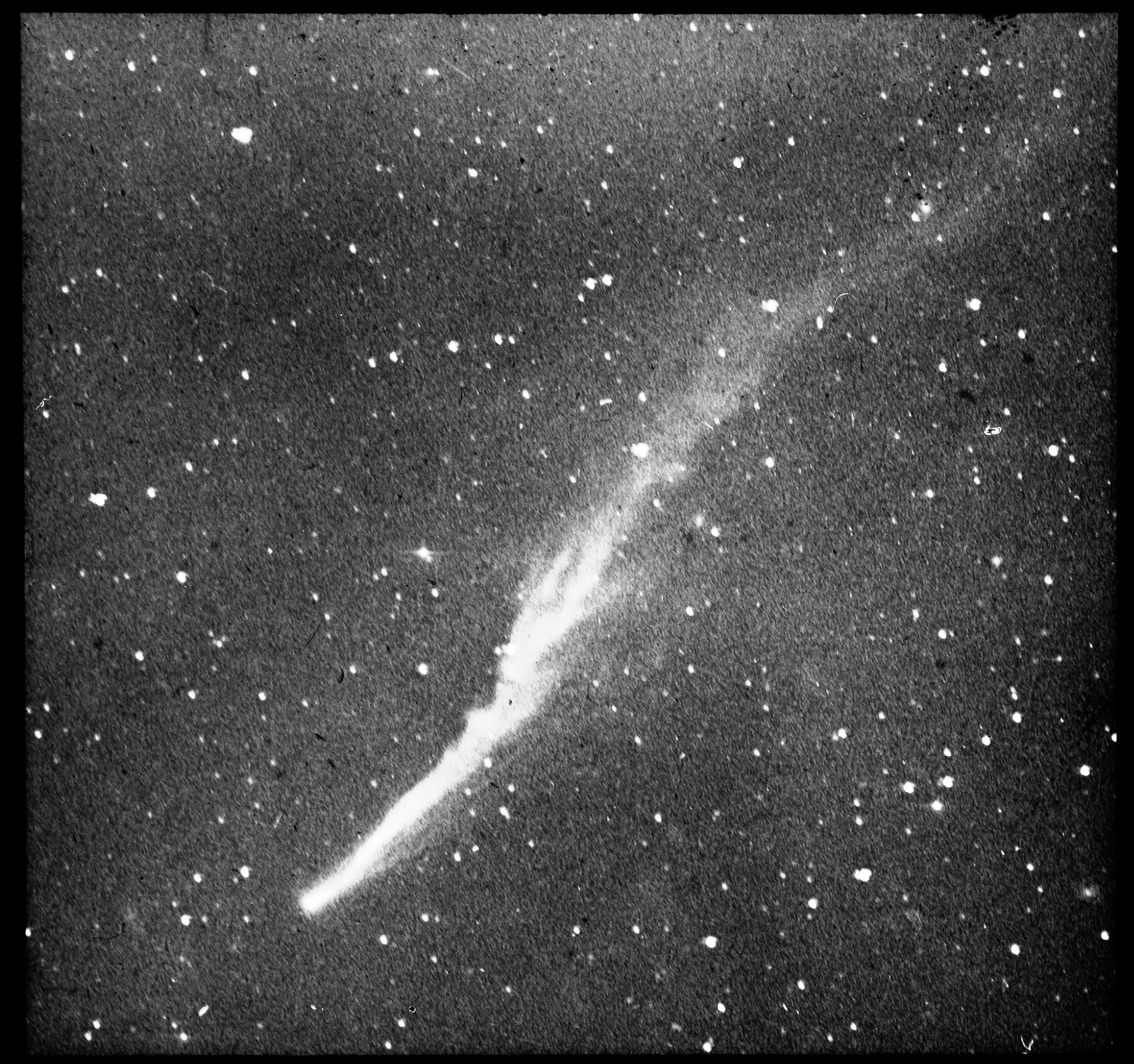
C/1893 U1 (Brooks)

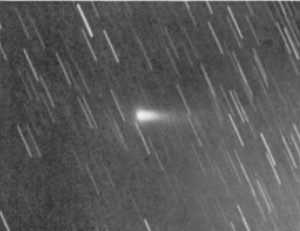
C/1900 O1 (Borrelly–Brooks)

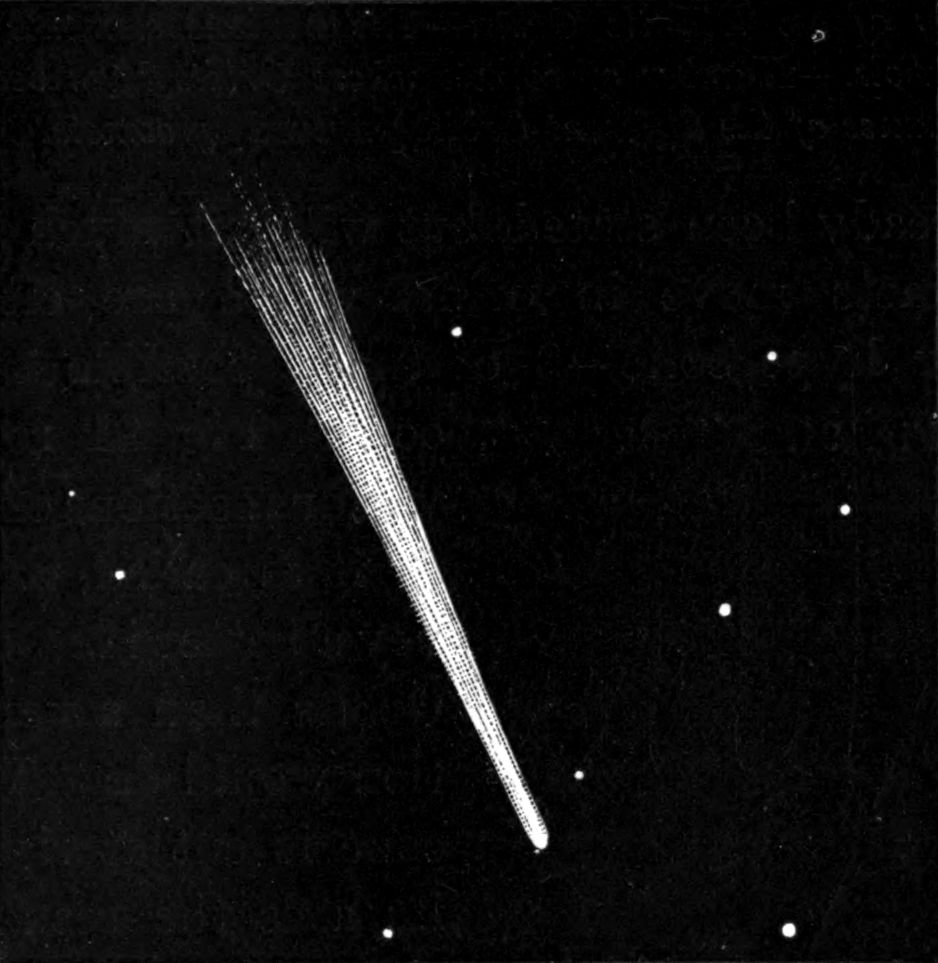
C/1902 G1 (Brooks)

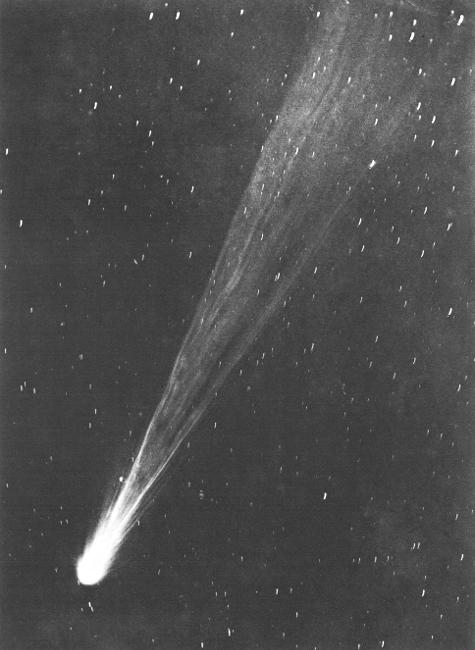
C/1911 O1 (Brooks)

7 out of 21 comets discovered by William R. Brooks between 1883 and 1911

After marrying Mary E. Smith in 1870, Brooks moved to Phelps where he discovered his first comet in 1881 at the Red House Observatory, which happened to be his own observatory that harbored telescopes of his own construction. Between the years of 1881 and 1887, Brooks went on to discover 10 more comets. He set a record in 1886 by discovering three novel comets in just one month.

A brief anecdote of his time in Phelps is found on pages 261–262 of "Country Lawyer" written by Bellamy Partridge, who gives him the pseudonym, Billy Bob Rivers.

Brooks observed 16 novel comets at The Smith Observatory in Geneva, New York.

He specialized in the discovery of comets, including periodic comets 12P/Pons–Brooks and 16P/Brooks. He also discovered the bright naked-eye comet C/1911 O1 (Brooks), and was a pioneer of astrophotography.

His final comet discovery came on October 20, 1912. Brooks was a traveling lecturer at the time and named the comet "Lasell Brooks" after having lectured at Lasell College multiple times. This was his final comet discovery.

William Robert Brooks had discovered 27 comets in his lifetime. This is second all time to Jean-Louis Pons, who had discovered 37 a half century earlier.

== The Smith Observatory ==
Brooks' success as an astronomer caught the eye of William Smith, a nurseryman and philanthropist. Smith had a strong desire to bring astronomy to Geneva to not only further his own academic pursuits, but to also expose his townsmen to a greater understanding of the universe.

In an effort to become his patron, Smith offered to construct Brooks his own observatory, as well as a house nearby for his family. He even met with Brooks, who was working as a photographer in Phelps at the time. Eventually, Brooks agreed and in 1888, The Smith Observatory was constructed at Geneva in Ontario County, New York.

The observatory housed a tower that was 17' in diameter and 34' in height. It contained two specialized telescopes, both of which were built by John Casey. The first was a 10" aperture equatorial refractor telescope. The second was meridian telescope that had an attached astronomical clock. Both the dome and mount of the observatory were constructed by the Warner & Swasey Company stationed out of Cleveland, Ohio.

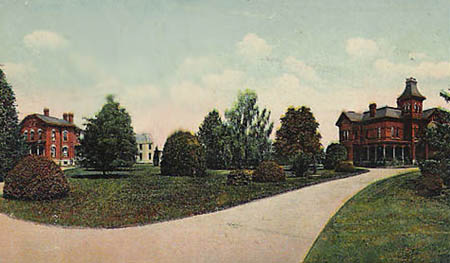
Postcard of The Smith House and Observatory

Brooks used The Smith Observatory to primarily make observations and further his research, but it also served as a teaching location. Brooks was known to regularly provide public lectures at the observatory for anyone interested. Brooks was even known to publish educational pamphlets explaining and describing the Solar System for nearby locals. In 1895, Brooks officially opened the observatory to students of nearby Hobart College.

Hobart College hired Brooks in 1900 and for the next 20 years, he taught astronomy in the Smith Observatory. He was later promoted to Director of the Observatory. Brooks was a very popular lecturer amongst the students and garnered the reputation of being known as "Sky" Brooks.

In 1906, William Smith gifted the observatory to the college for which the college is now named Hobart and William Smith Colleges. The observatory is official property of the university.

== Awards ==
In his life, Brooks received medals from the Lick Observatory, the Astronomical Society of the Pacific, the International Jury at the St. Louis Exhibition, the Astronomical Society of Mexico, and the Lalande Medal of the French Academy of Sciences in 1899. Brooks was elected a Fellow of the Royal Astronomical Society in 1888. The Warner Prize was also awarded to Brooks for his specific comet discovers in the following years: 1883, 1885, 1886, and 1887. Towards the end of this life, he was appointed a Professor and Honorary Doctor of Science by Hobart College.

Minor planet 2773 Brooks is named in his honor.

== Death ==
While working extensively through the night to photograph an approaching comet, Brooks fell in February 1921. He was bedridden at home for several months following, until he died May 3 in Geneva, New York. William Robert Brooks is buried in Glenwood Cemetery in Geneva, New York.

Following his death, Hobart College released this statement on May 12: "In the death of William Robert Brooks, Hobart College has suffered a distinct loss... It will be a long time before Hobart in every respect will be able to reconcile itself to the loss of our late professor, who for more than twenty years gave to her the fruit of his many years of study and research."
