= Comet ZTF (disambiguation) =

Comet ZTF may refer to any comets below discovered by the Zwicky Transient Facility:

- C/2020 V2 (ZTF)
- C/2021 D2 (ZTF)
- C/2021 E3 (ZTF)
- P/2021 N1 (ZTF)
- C/2022 E3 (ZTF)
- P/2022 P2 (ZTF)
- C/2022 P3 (ZTF)
