= C/2021 A1 (Leonard) =

Hyperbolic comet

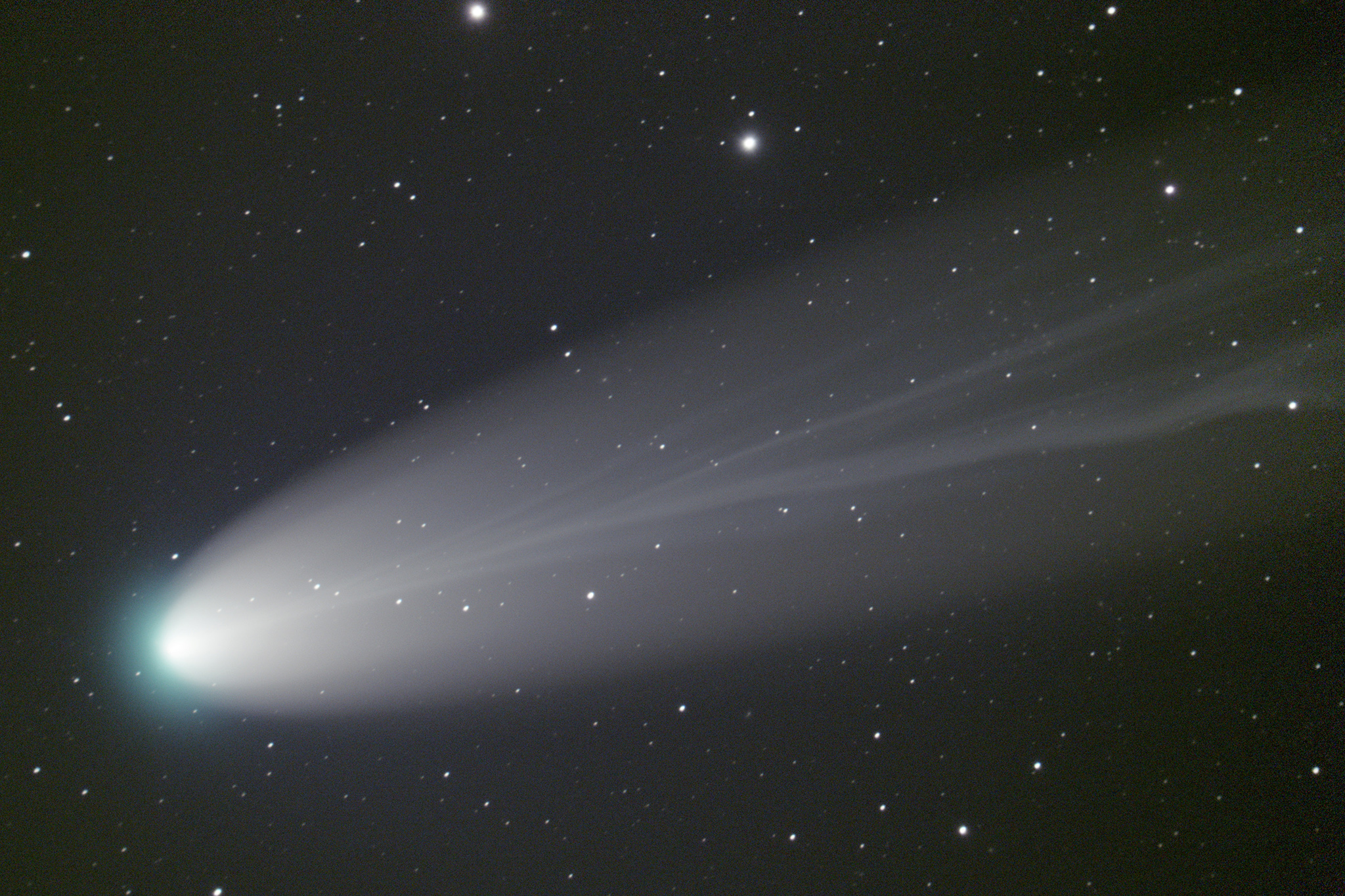
- Comet Leonard imaged near Wedderburn, Australia on 28 December 2021

Discovery
- Discovered by: Gregory J. Leonard
- Discovery site: Mount Lemmon Survey
- Discovery date: 3 January 2021

Designations
- MPC designation: C/2021 A1, D/2021 A1
- Alternative designations: C4AGJ62

Orbital characteristics
- Observation arc: 526 days
- Aphelion: ≈3700 AU (barycentric epoch 1950)
- Perihelion: 0.6151 AU
- Eccentricity: 0.99966 (barycentric epoch 1950); 1.00004 (barycentric epoch 2100)
- Orbital period: ≈80000 yr (inbound)
- Inclination: 132.68°
- Longitude of ascending node: 255.86°
- Argument of periapsis: 225.09°
- Last perihelion: 3 January 2022
- Earth MOID: 0.231 AU (34.6 million km)
- Jupiter MOID: 0.296 AU (44.3 million km)

Physical characteristics
- Dimensions: 0.8–1.6 km (0.50–0.99 mi)
- Mean diameter: 1.2 km (0.75 mi)
- Synodic rotation period: 6.56±0.1 days
- Spectral type: (V–R) = 0.57±0.02
- Comet total magnitude (M1): 5.3

C/2021 A1 (Leonard) was a long period comet that was discovered by G. J. Leonard at the Mount Lemmon Observatory on 3 January 2021 (a year before perihelion) when the comet was 5 AU (750 million km) from the Sun. It had a retrograde orbit. The nucleus was about 1.2 km (0.75 mi) across. It came within 4 million km (2.5 million mi) of Venus, the closest-known cometary approach to Venus.

== Observational history ==
The comet was discovered by G. J. Leonard at the Mount Lemmon Observatory on 3 January 2021 (a year before perihelion) when the comet was 5 AU (750 million km) from the Sun. The comet appeared to have a 10" coma and a 5" broad tail in the photographs taken as part of the Mt. Lemmon Survey and its magnitude was estimated to be 19.0. Precovery images dated back to April 11, 2020.

On 10 October the comet showed a short but dense dust tail. In late November the comet appeared to stop brightening as expected and to fade instead, indicating a possible disintegration of the nucleus. In early December the comet had an apparent magnitude (coma+nucleus) of around 6. The first reports of naked-eye observations by experienced observers started coming in on 5 December 2021. Much like observing Messier 33, the low surface brightness of the comet can make it difficult to observe near urban areas. On 3 December 2021 many emission lines of NH_{2}, C_{2}, and [OI] were detected in the spectrum of the comet in the wavelength range between 5000 and 7000 Å. On the morning of 6 December 2021 the comet was about 5 degrees from the star Arcturus. On 14 December 2021 the comet was 14.7 degrees from the Sun and quickly became better seen from the southern hemisphere.

The forward scattering of light helped the comet to briefly brighten to as much as magnitude 2.5, but was also enhanced by a modest outburst. The comet experienced outbursts on December 15, 20 and 23, thus reaching third magnitude before dimming back to 4th magnitude. The ion tail of the comet appeared complex, with knots and streamers. The comet's discoverer called the tails "some of the best ever observed". In stacked photos, the tail could be traced for 60 degrees in the sky. While the comet was lower in the sky, atmospheric extinction offset much of the brightening. As of 22 December 2021, the comet was around apparent magnitude 4, making it a good binocular comet for the Southern hemisphere. It was the brightest comet of 2021. One more outburst took place after perihelion, on 6–8 January 2022, when the comet brightened by 1.5 magnitudes.

On 23 February 2022 the comet was observed with the SLOOH telescope in Chile, operated by Martin Masek. The comet lacked a central concentration, which indicates that the nucleus of the comet disintegrated or evaporated completely. Further observations confirmed the lack of concentration. In April 2022, the disintegrating comet was observed using the Hubble Space Telescope, with further observations planned for June 2022. No surviving fragments were found by the Hubble Space Telescope, while the Swan Hill observatory imaged an extensive debris cloud. The disintegration of the comet probably started in mid December 2021.

== Orbit ==
Animation of C／2021 A1's orbit around Sun – 2021 close approach C/2021 A1 · Sun · Mercury · Venus · Earth · Mars

C/2021 A1 has been inside of the orbit of Neptune since May 2009. Using an epoch of 1950 which is well before the comet entered the planetary region of the Solar System, a barycentric orbit solution suggests the comet had an approximately 80,000-year orbital period. Thus, the comet has spent the last 40,000 years inbound from approximately 3,700 AU (550 billion km) (0.06 light year). After perihelion, the comet will be ejected from the Solar System. The barycentric orbit will remain hyperbolic after September 2022.

On 12 December 2021 the comet was 0.233 AU (34.9 million km) from Earth and on 18 December 2021 it was 0.0285 AU (4.26 million km) from Venus. The latter distance is smaller than any known close encounter of Earth with a long period comet, and one of the closest recorded for any planet in recent history. The minimum orbit intersection distance of Venus with the comet is about 50,000 kilometers, with Venus passing from that point two days after the comet, so it is possible that dust from the comet could create a meteor shower in Venus.

It made its closest approach to the Sun on 3 January 2022.

== Gallery ==
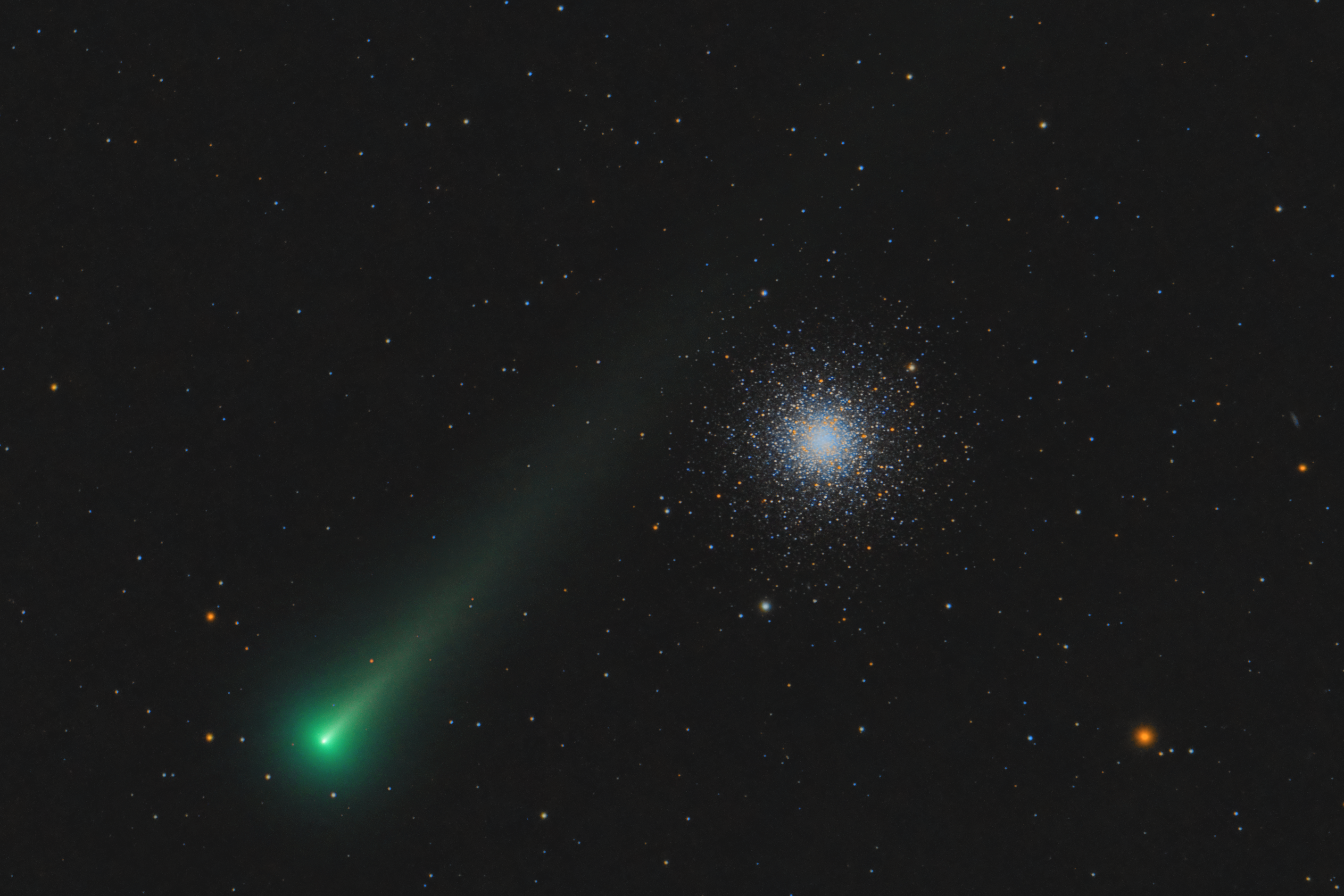
Conjunction of Comet C/2021 A1 and Messier 3, captured on 3 Dec 2021 from Summerville, SC

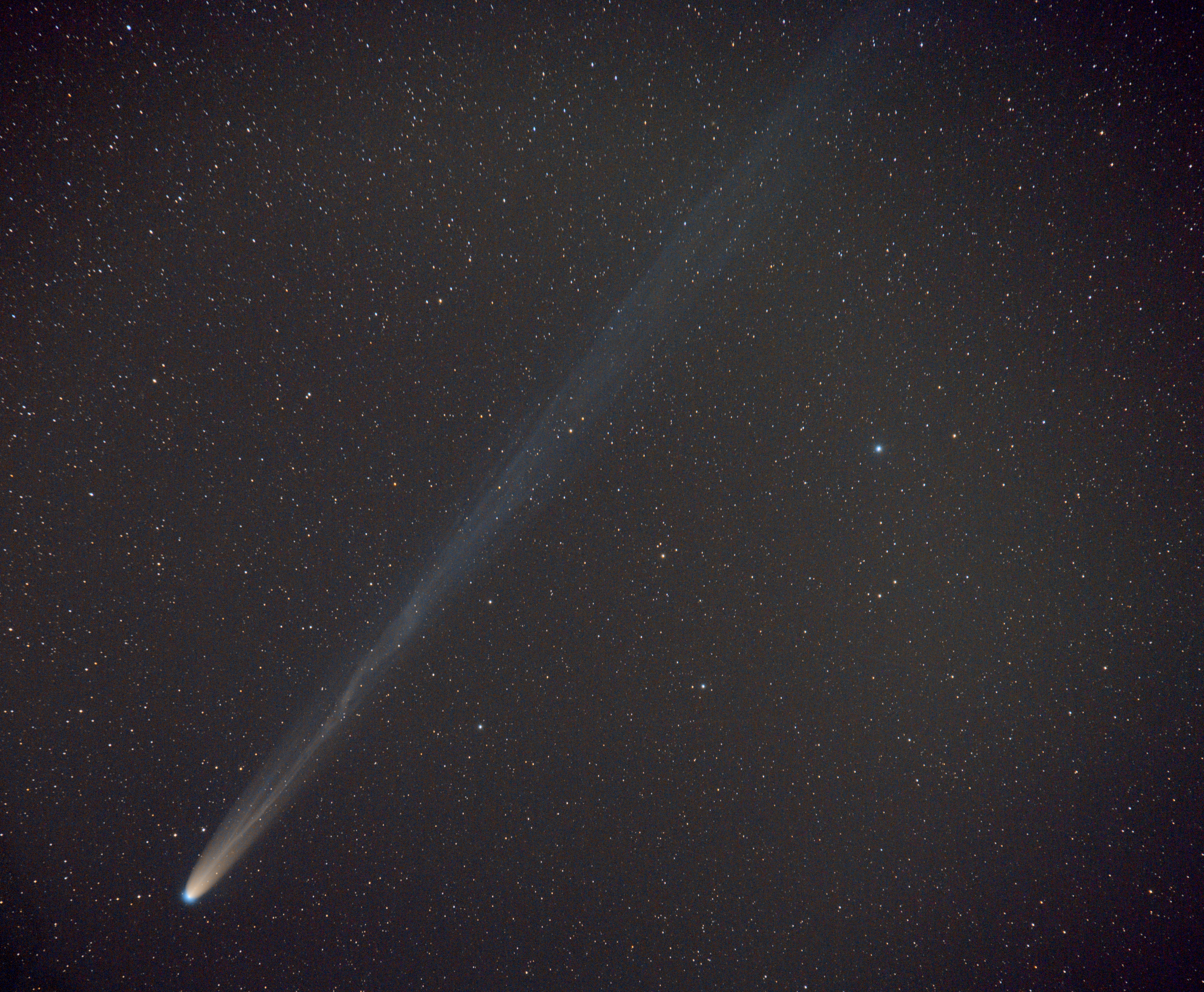
Wide angle view of C/2021 A1 on December 28, 2021

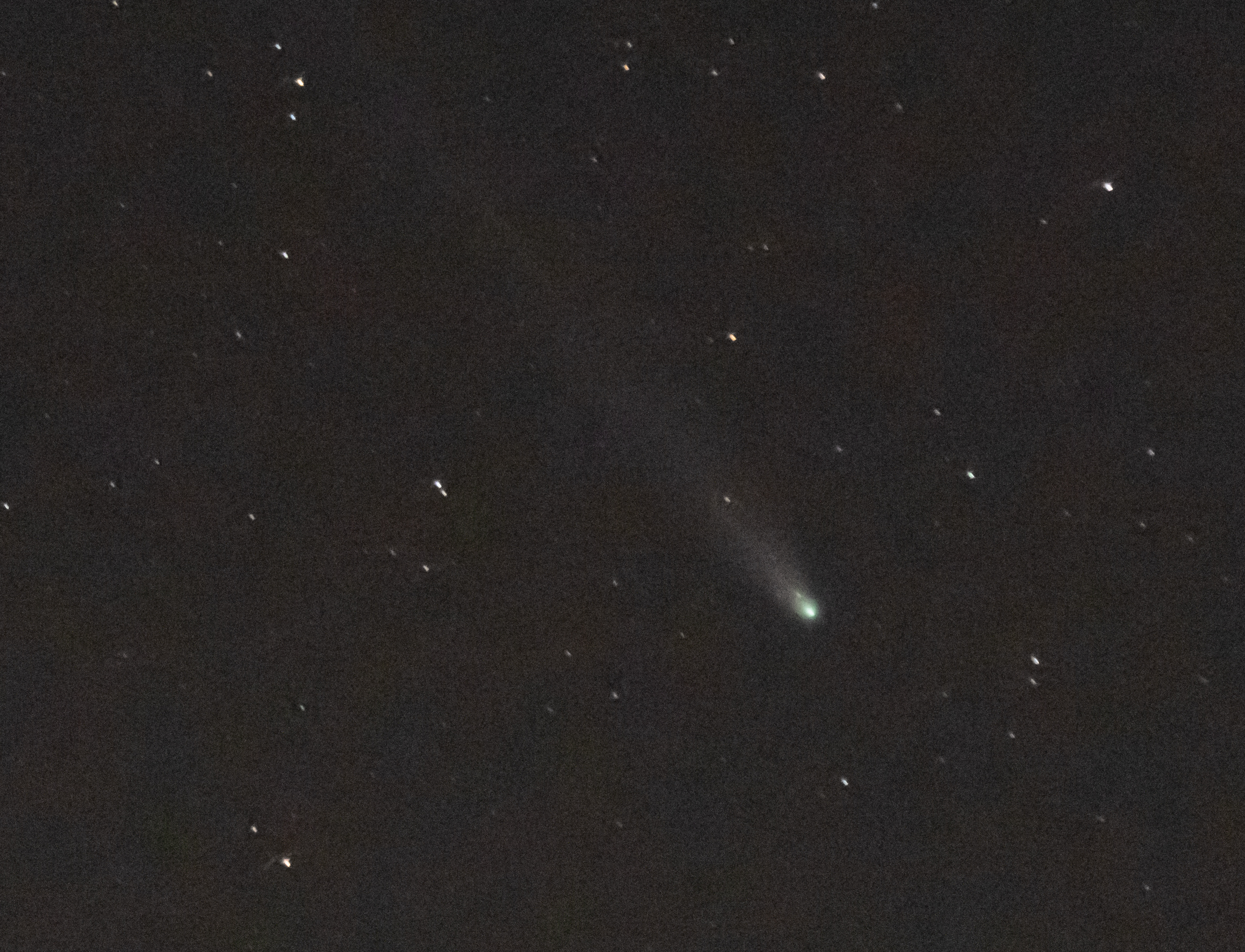
The comet over Tenerife on 31 December 2021

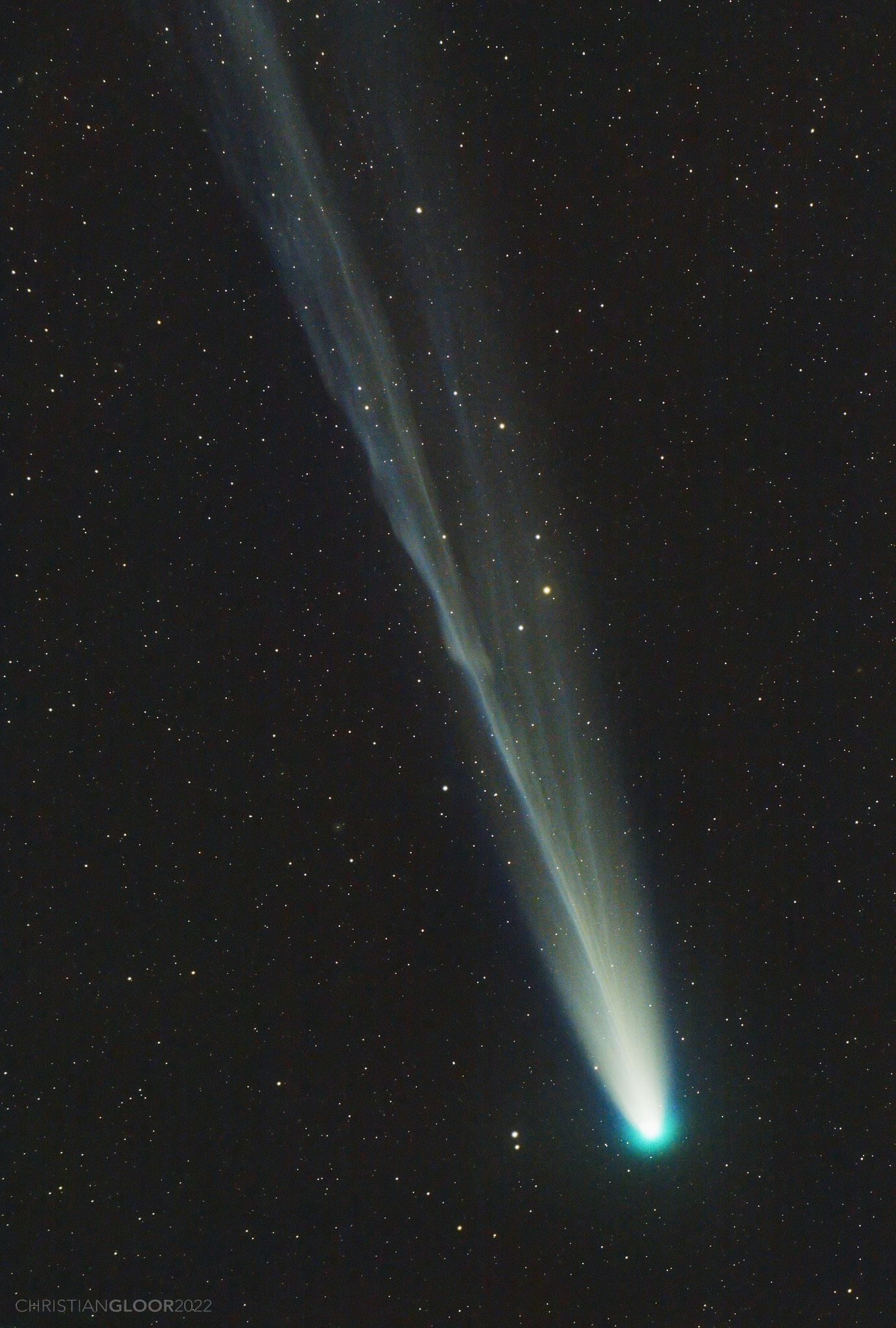
Comet Leonard on January 2, 2022, one day before perihelion

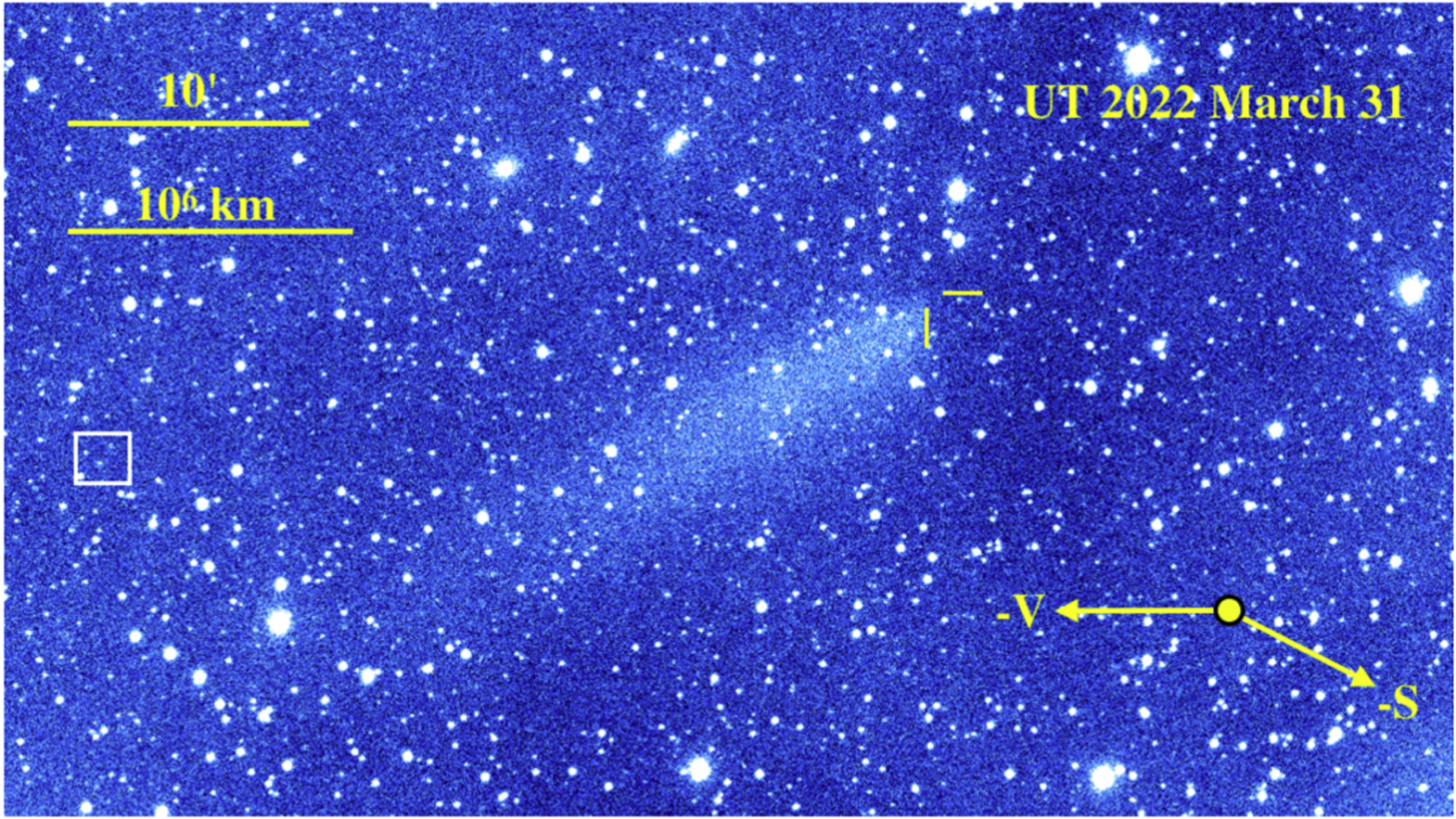
The debris field created by the disintegrated comet Leonard on 31 March 2022

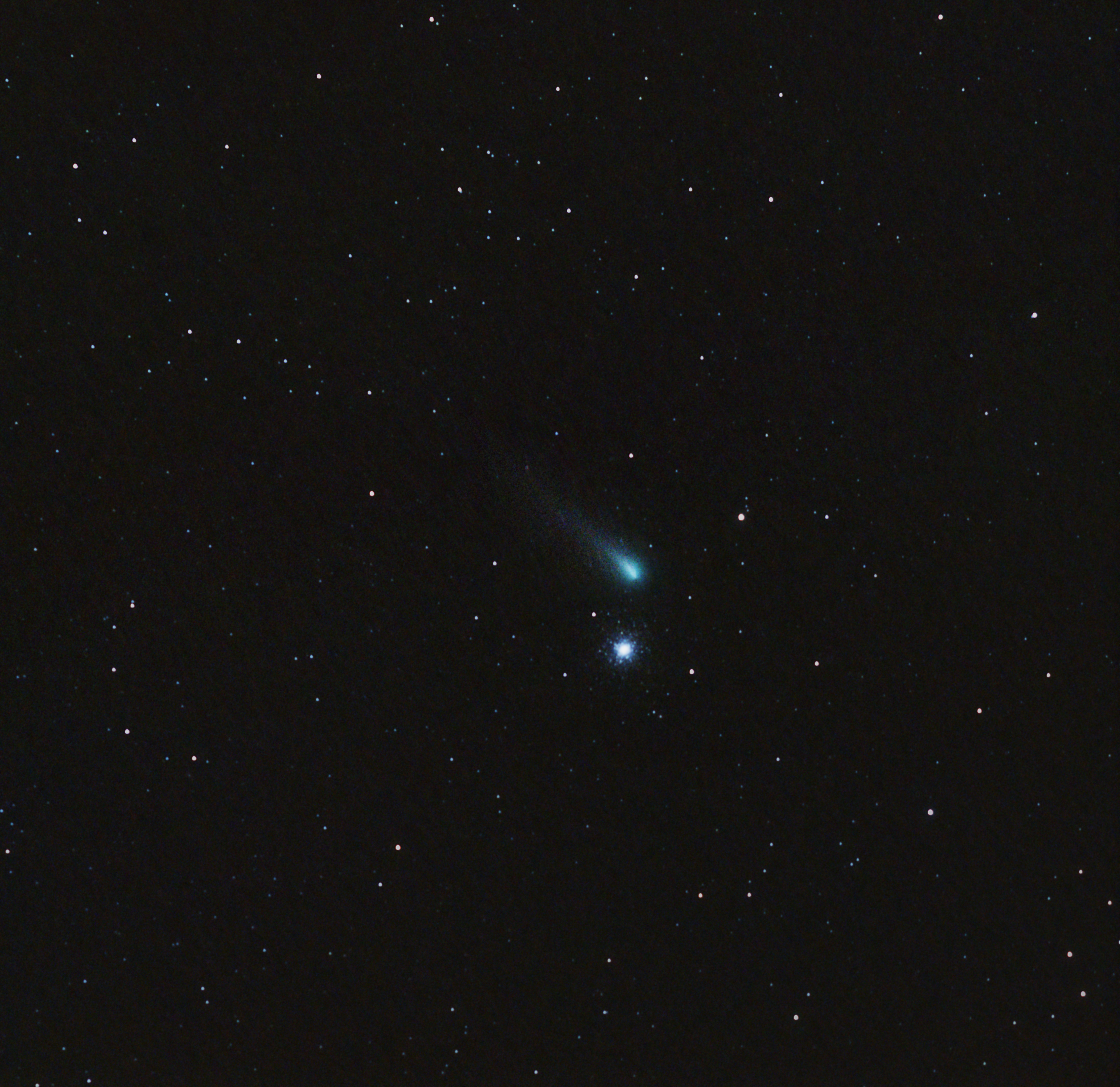
Stacked exposure of Comet C/2021 A1 next to Messier 3, captured on the 2nd of December 2021

== See also ==
- C/2011 L4 (PanSTARRS)
