= C/2022 E3 (ZTF) =

Non-periodic comet

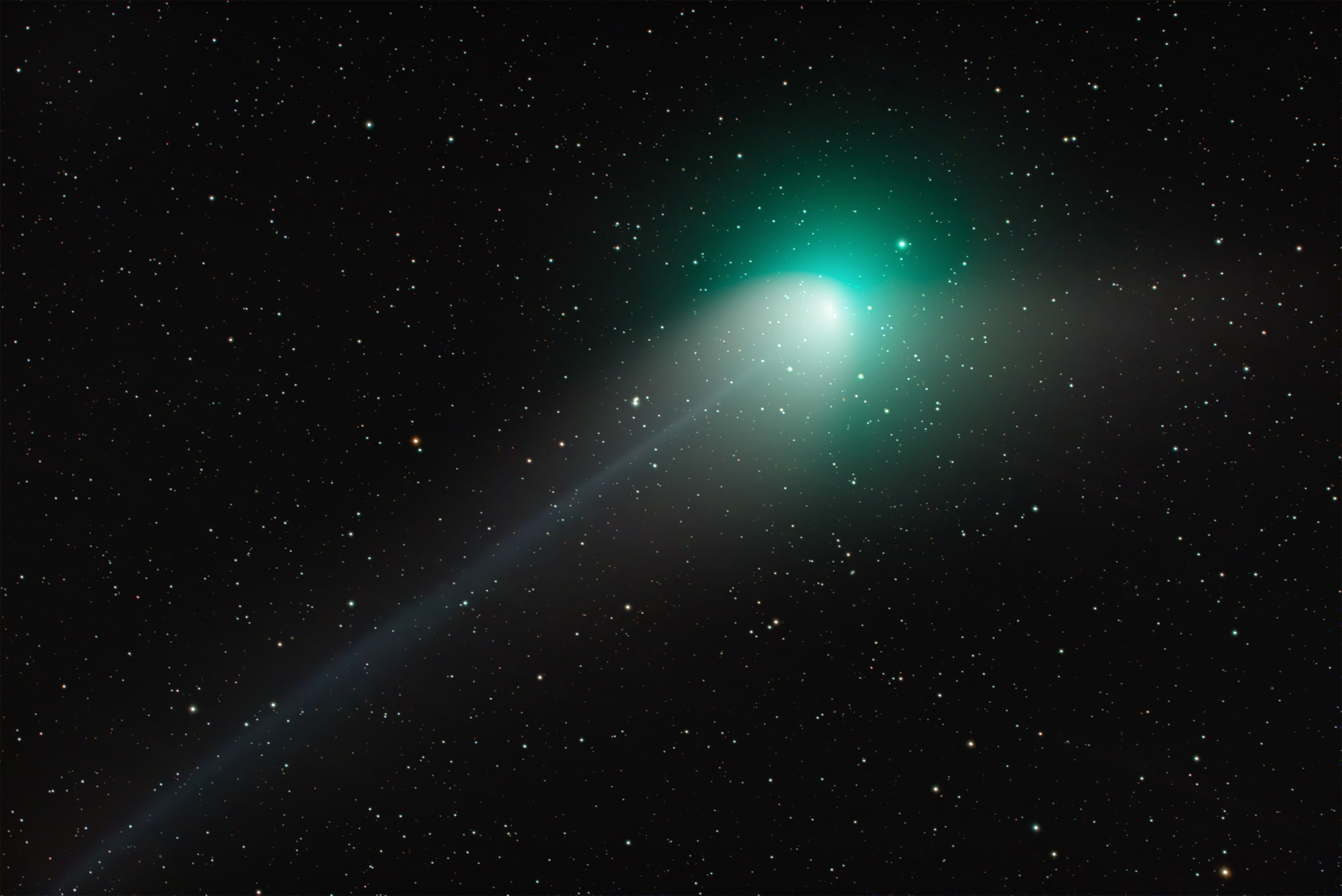
- C/2022 E3 (ZTF) photographed by Alessandro Bianconi on 27 January 2023

Discovery
- Discovery site: Zwicky Transient Facility
- Discovery date: 2 March 2022

Orbital characteristics
- Epoch: 21 October 2022 (JD 2459873.5)
- Observation arc: 916 days
- Earliest precovery date: 10 July 2021R
- Number of observations: 8,235
- Aphelion: ≈2800 AU (barycentric epoch 1950)
- Perihelion: 1.112 AU
- Eccentricity: 0.999988 (barycentric epoch 2050)
- Orbital period: ≈50,000 yr (inbound); Possible Ejection (outbound)
- Inclination: 109.17°
- Last perihelion: 12 January 2023
- Earth MOID: 0.221 AU (33.1 million km)
- Jupiter MOID: 1.743 AU (260.7 million km)

Physical characteristics
- Dimensions: ~0.81–2.79 km (0.50–1.73 mi)
- Synodic rotation period: 8.5–8.7 hours
- Geometric albedo: 0.1
- Comet total magnitude (M1): 10.8
- Apparent magnitude: 5.0 (2023 apparition)

C/2022 E3 (ZTF) is a non-periodic comet from the Oort cloud that was discovered by the Zwicky Transient Facility (ZTF) on 2 March 2022. The comet has a bright green glow around its nucleus, due to the effect of sunlight on diatomic carbon and cyanogen. The comet's systematic designation starts with C to indicate that it is not a periodic comet, and "2022 E3" means that it was the third comet to be discovered in the first half of March 2022.

The comet nucleus was estimated to be about approximately 0.81–2.79 km (0.50–1.73 mi) in radius, rotating every 8.5 to 8.7 hours. Its tails of dust and gas extended for millions of kilometers and, during January 2023, an anti-tail was also visible.

The comet reached its perihelion on 12 January 2023, at a distance of 1.11 AU (166 million km), and the closest approach to Earth was on 1 February 2023, at a distance of 0.28 AU (42 million km). The comet reached magnitude 5 and was visible with the naked eye under moonless dark skies.

== Observational history ==
=== Discovery ===
Astronomers Bryce Bolin and Frank Masci discovered C/2022 E3 (ZTF) using the Zwicky Transient Facility (ZTF) survey, which uses the 1.2-m f/2.4 Schmidt telescope at Palomar Observatory, on 2 March 2022. Upon discovery, the comet had an apparent magnitude of 17.3 and was about 4.3 AU (640 million km) from the Sun. The comet then was located in the morning sky, at a solar elongation of 44 degrees.

The object was initially identified as an asteroid, but subsequent observations revealed it had a very condensed coma, indicating it is a comet. H. Sato reported its coma was 8 arcseconds across in stacked photos he obtained from the remote observatory in Mayhill, New Mexico, while K. Yoshimoto reported its coma was 15 arcseconds across and the comet had a small tail 25 arcseconds long. The comet in stacked ZTF images appeared extended when compared to nearby stars and was flagged as a comet by the Tails neural network.

The comet was subsequently detected in images taken by Pan-STARRS 1 in Haleakalā Observatory, Hawai'i on 10 July 2021, when the comet had an apparent magnitude of 23. The comet had also been photographed without being noticed by ZTF in October and November 2021.

=== Near perihelion ===
The dust tail and the coma were gradually getting bigger as the comet was approaching the Sun between July and October 2022, and dust production rose from 241±3 kg/s in July to 476±9 kg/s. By early November 2022, the comet had brightened to magnitude 10 and was appearing to move slowly in Corona Borealis and Serpens as it moved parallel to Earth. The comet exhibited a green coma and a yellowish dust tail and a faint ion tail. The comet was visible in the early evening and started being visible in the morning sky by the end of November. By 19 December, the comet had developed a greenish coma, a short, broad dust tail, and a long faint ion tail stretching across a 2.5-degree wide field of view. After that, the comet started moving northward, passing through Boötes, Draco, and Ursa Minor, passing within about 10 degrees of Polaris by the end of January.

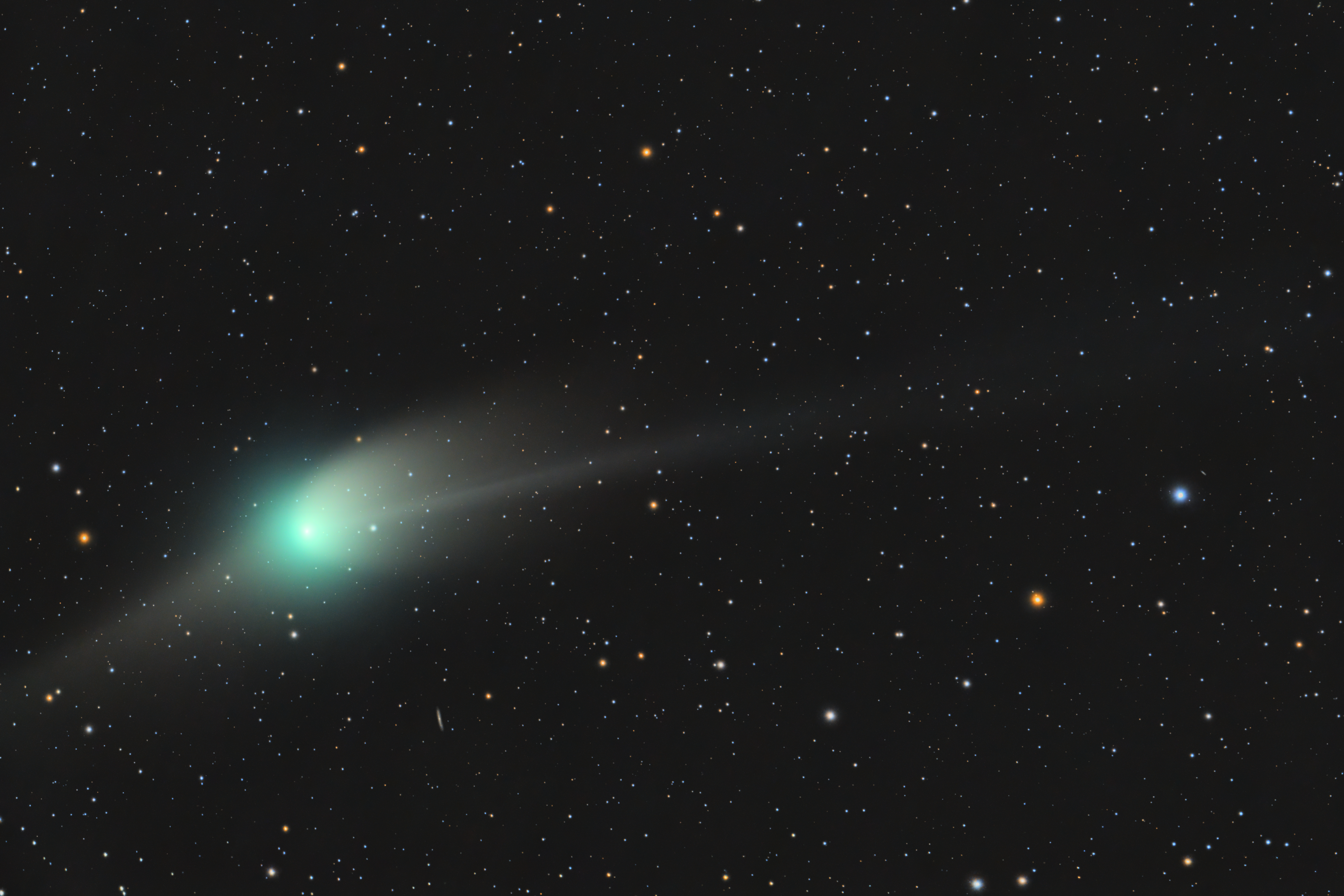
The comet on 24 January 2023, with the antitail towards the left

The comet reached its perihelion on 12 January 2023, at a distance of 1.11 AU (166 million km). The first naked-eye observations of the comet occurred on 16 and 17 January, with the comet having an estimated magnitude of 5.4 and 6.0 respectively. Strong solar wind from a coronal mass ejection caused a disconnection event of the ion tail of the comet on 17 January, making it appear broken. On 22 January an anti-tail became visible. This tail appears pointing toward the Sun and opposite the dust and ion tails. It is caused by particles lying on a disk on the orbital plane of the comet, and when Earth aligns with that plane, they look like a reverse tail. XMM-Newton X-ray space telescope observed the comet on 23 January, but it was only faintly detected.

The comet's closest approach to Earth was on 1 February 2023, at a distance of 0.28 AU (42 million km; 26 million mi). As of 31 January 2023, the comet had an apparent magnitude of about 5; its coma was reported to be about 20' across. The central region of the coma measured bout 4 arcminutes across, which corresponds to diameter of 50,000 km (31,000 mi), and featured two jets about 20 arcseconds long. During its closest approach to Earth, it was near the north celestial pole and located within the constellation Camelopardalis. The moon was in the waxing gibbous phase and the brightening moon hampered viewing the comet without optical aid. On 5 February, at the full moon, the comet passed 1.5 degrees from the bright star Capella. On 6 February, C/2022 E3 (ZTF) visually passed near comet C/2022 U2 (ATLAS). On 10 to 11 February, the comet passed 1.5 degrees from Mars and, on 13 to 15 February, passed in front of the Hyades star cluster.

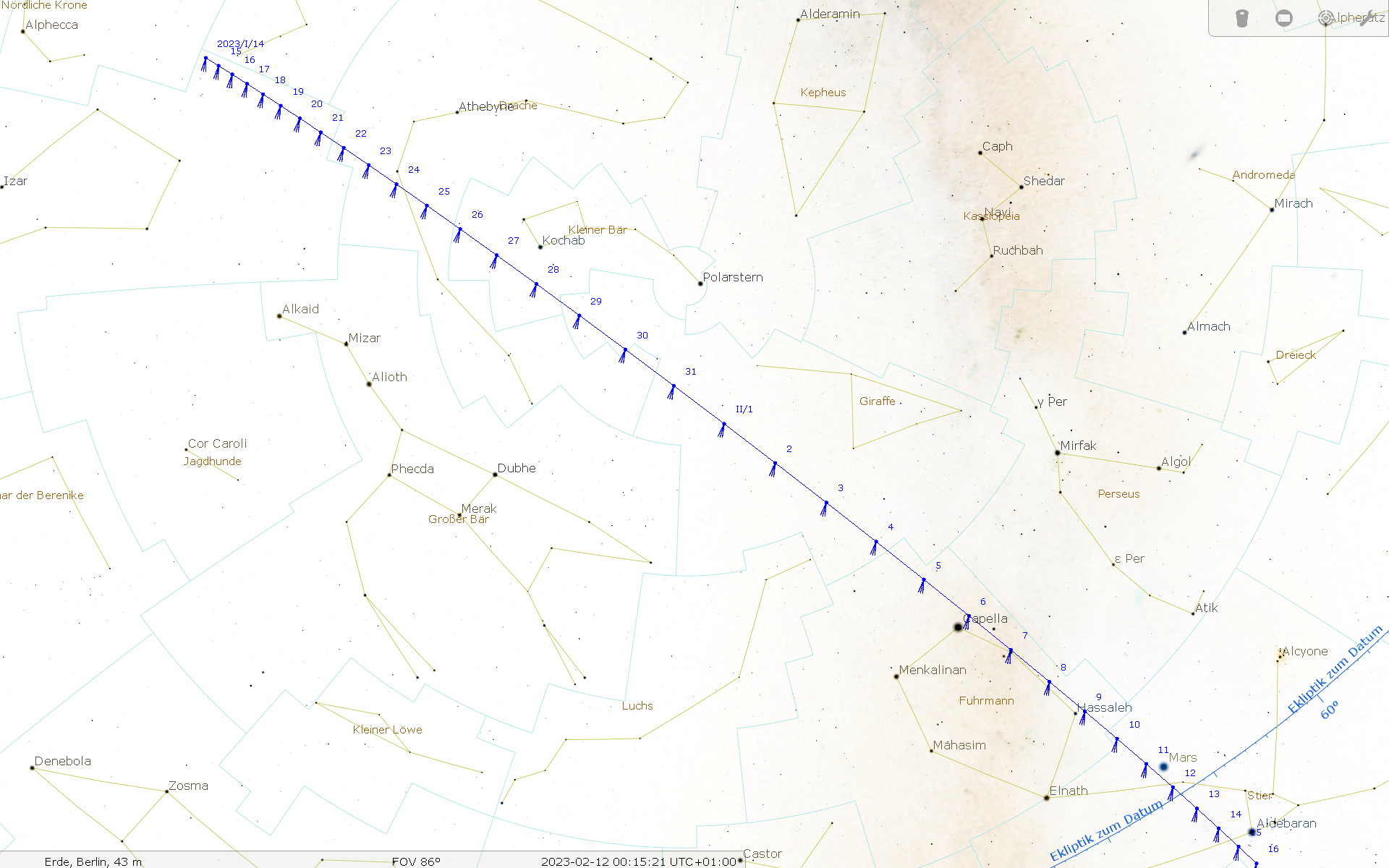
Positions of the comet C/2022 E3 (ZTF) in the starry sky between 14 January and 16 February 2023

C/2022 E3 closest Earth approach on 1 February 2023 17:55 UT
Date and time of closest approach	Earth distance (AU)	Sun distance (AU)	Velocity relative to Earth (km/s)	Velocity relative to Sun (km/s)	Uncertainty region (3-sigma)	Lunar elongation	Lunar phase	Reference
2023-02-01 17:55	0.2839 AU (42.47 million km; 26.39 million mi; 110.5 LD)	1.159 AU (173.4 million km; 107.7 million mi; 451 LD)	57.4	39.1	± 500 km	44°	86%	Horizons

== Scientific results ==
The nucleus of the comet was found to rotate every 8.5 to 8.7 hours. In the spectrum of the comet in the wavelength range between 5000 and 7000 Å many emission lines of NH_{2}, C_{2}, and [OI] are detected. The spectrum of the comet was obtained on 10 March 2023 and lines associated with CN, diatomic and triatomic carbon and possibly OI. The ratio of C_{2} to CN is about 0.6, which is lower when compared to most of the Solar System comets, although not too low to be considered depleted. Other species detected in the comet include hydrocyan, hydrogen isocyanide, CH_{3}CN, isocyanic acid, formamide, methanol, formaldehyde, formic acid, acetaldehyde, H_{2}S, carbon monosulfide, carbonyl sulfide, ethanol and CH_{2}OH_{2}. The comet was depleted in hypervolatiles (low CO and H_{2}S abundances relative to water) and had a relatively low methanol abundance relative to water (1.8%) compared to the mean of other comets.

=== Color ===
The green color is likely due to the presence of diatomic carbon, chiefly around the comet's head. The C_{2} molecule, when excited by the solar ultraviolet radiation, emits mostly in infrared, but its triplet state radiates at 518 nm (nanometers). It is produced by photolysis of organic materials evaporated from the nucleus. It then undergoes further photolysis, with a lifetime of about two days, at which time the green glow appears in the comet's head but not the tail. The comet researcher Matthew Knight opined that the green color of this comet is not unusual for comets with a higher gas content, but they only rarely approach the Earth as close so it provides for very good observation of the greenish hue. Similar colors were seen with observations of comet C/2021 A1 (Leonard).

== Outbound trajectory ==
Before perihelion passage JPL Horizons showed the barycentric outbound orbit to be bound to the Sun+Jupiter system at an epoch in the year 2050, but with an unrealistic maximum distance of 270,000 AU (4.3 ly) which is beyond the Oort cloud. Post perihelion, the outbound orbit solution is only weakly bound to the Sun. Using a heliocentric orbit at epoch 2495 with just the Sun's mass shows the comet unbound to the Solar System. The Sun's escape velocity at 200 AU is 2.98 km/s and the comet will be going 2.97 km/s at 200 AU from the Sun. The comet will either leave the Solar System altogether or return in many millions of years depending on perturbations from outgassing (non-gravitational forces) or perturbations while in the Oort cloud by the galactic tide and passing stars.

== Comparable objects ==
Diffuse objects visible to the naked eye
Object	apmag
Andromeda Galaxy (M31)	3.4
Orion Nebula (M42)	4
C/2022 E3 (ZTF)	5
Triangulum Galaxy (M33)	5.7

== Gallery ==
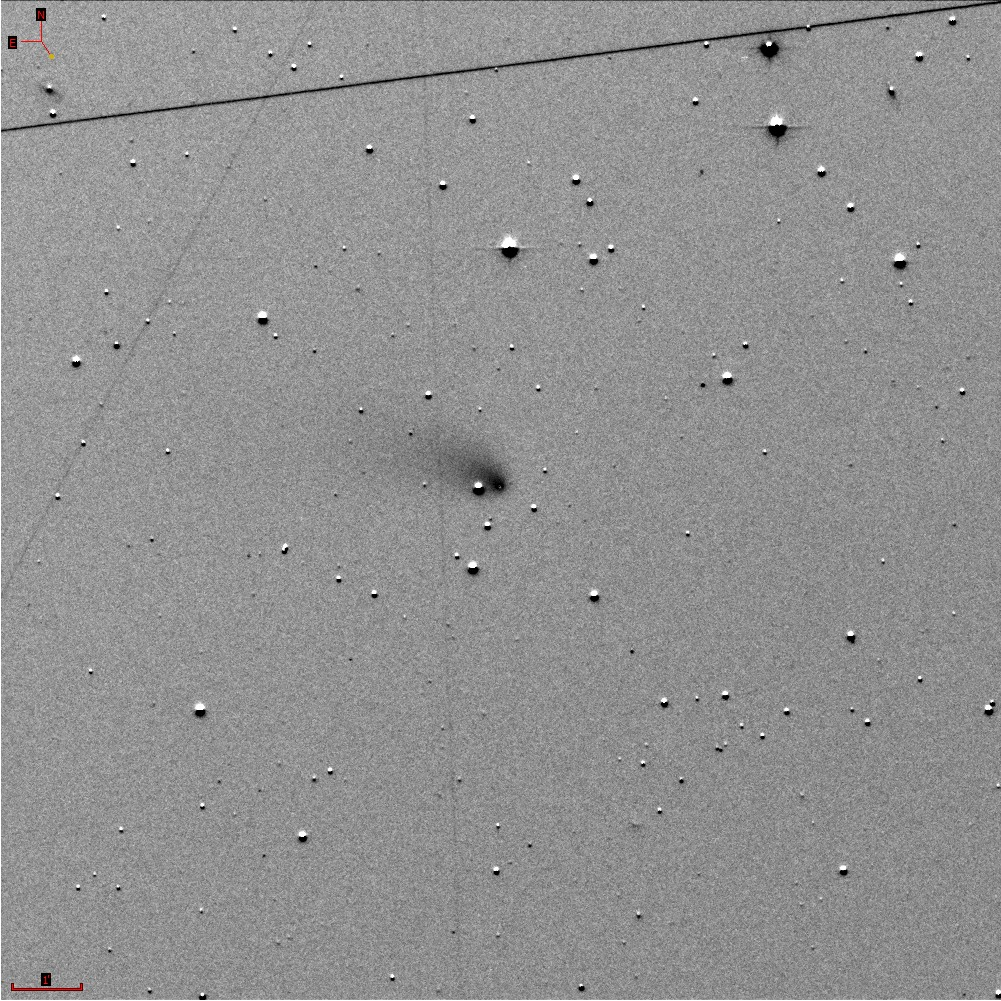
The comet in December 2022, from the Asiago Astrophysical Observatory

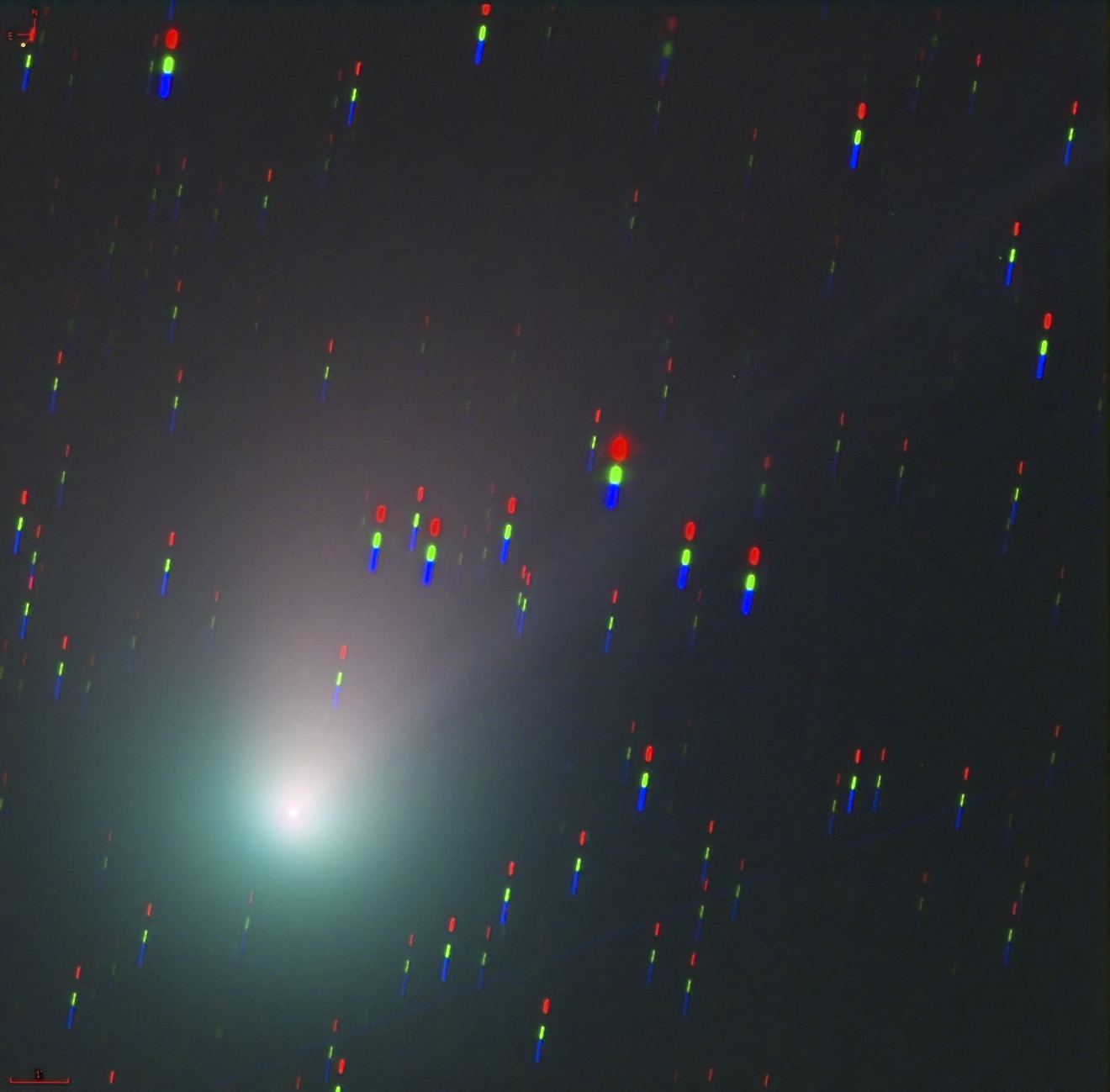
The comet on 10 January 2023 by Andrea Reguitti of the University of Padua

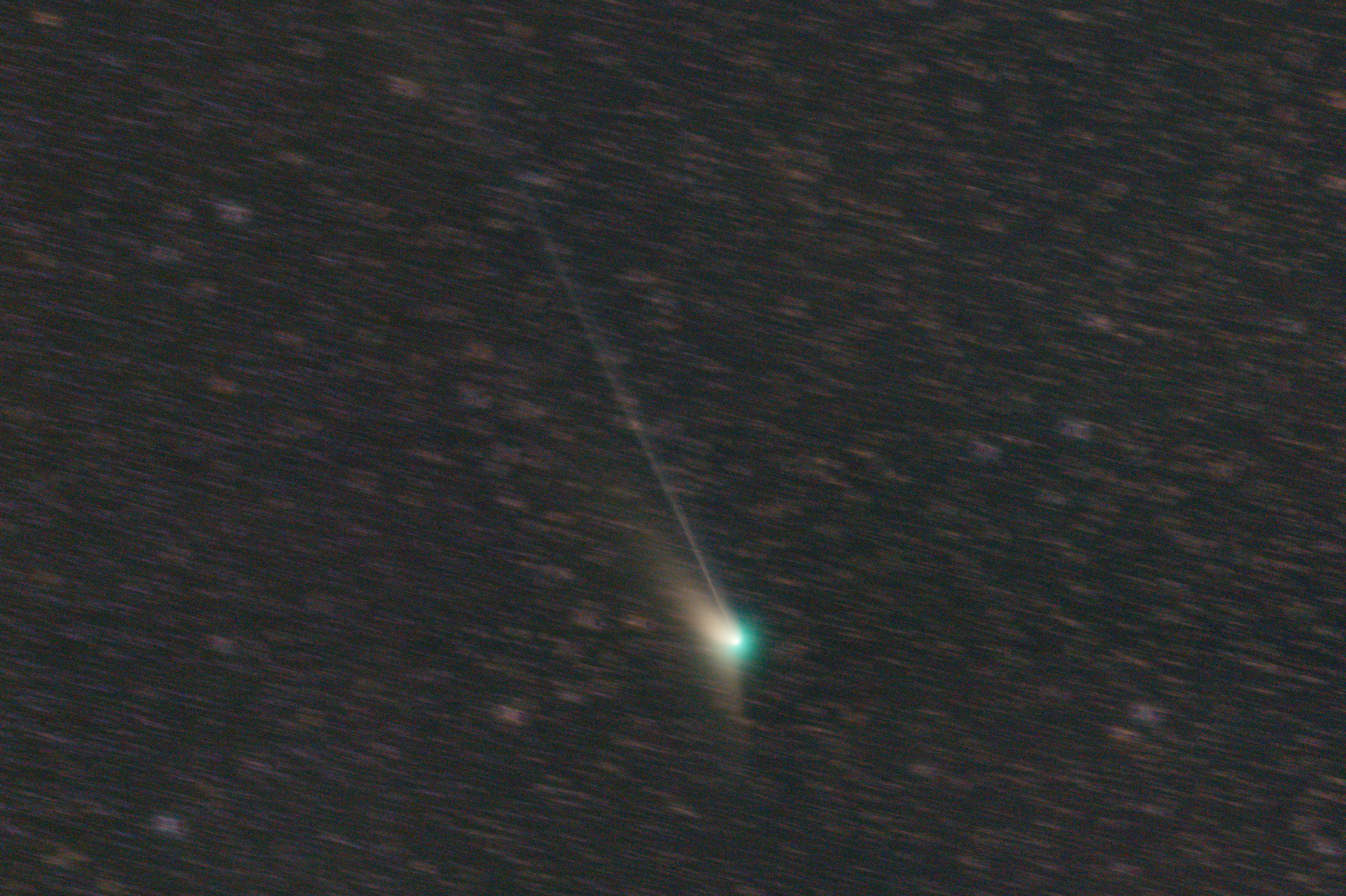
The comet on 20 January 2023, showing a broad dust tail and a thin ion tail

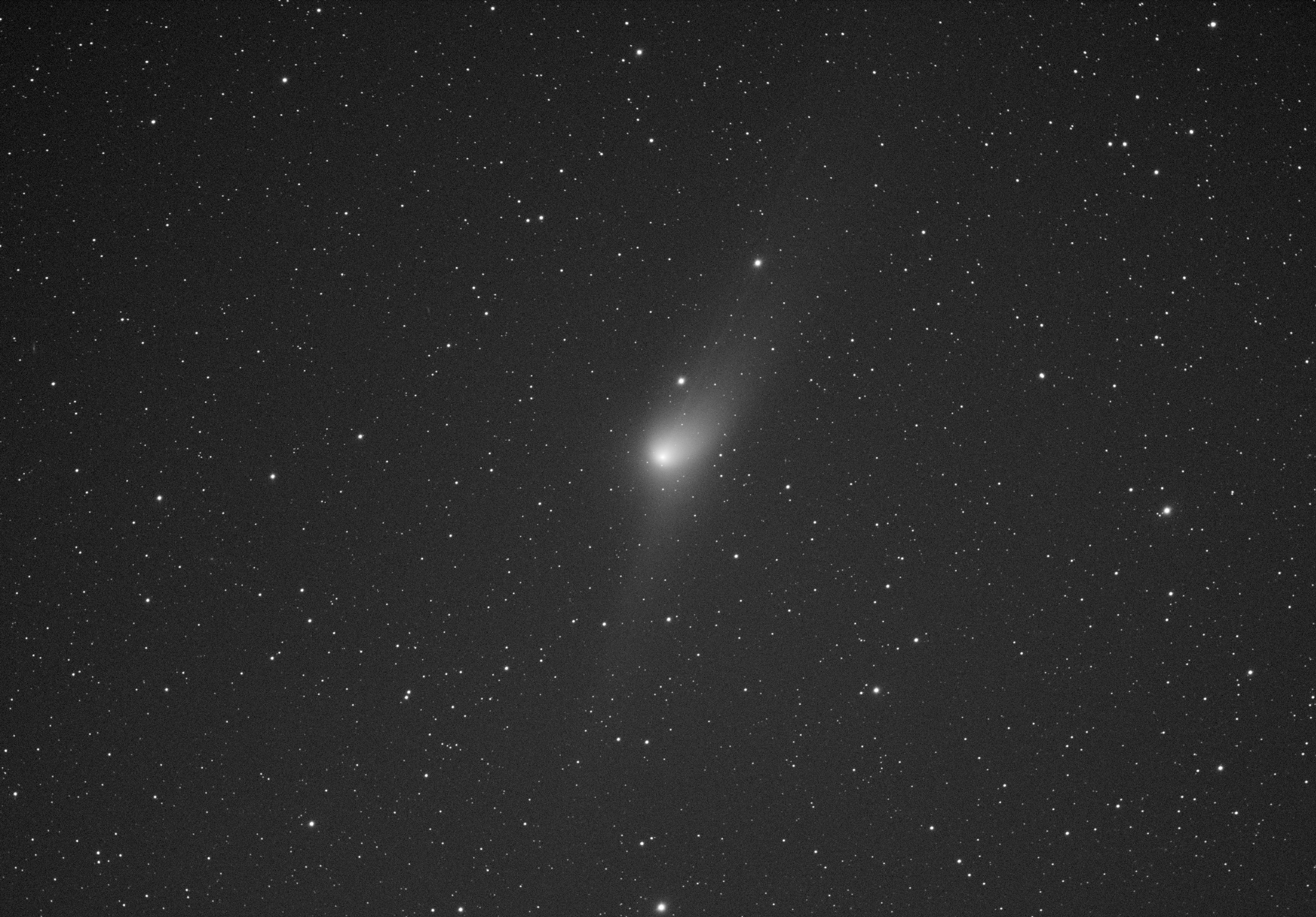
The comet on 22 January 2023, with the antitail visible

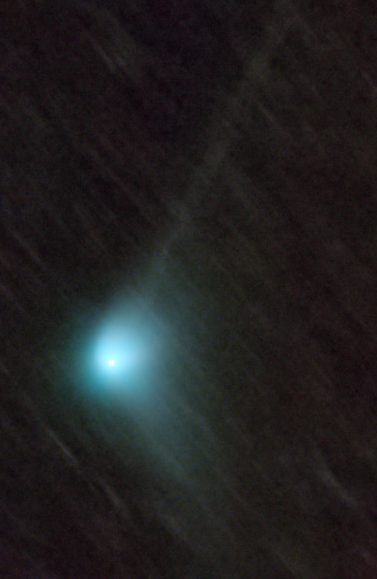
C/2022 E3 (ZTF) observed from Vancouver, Canada on 28 January by Jaden Choi

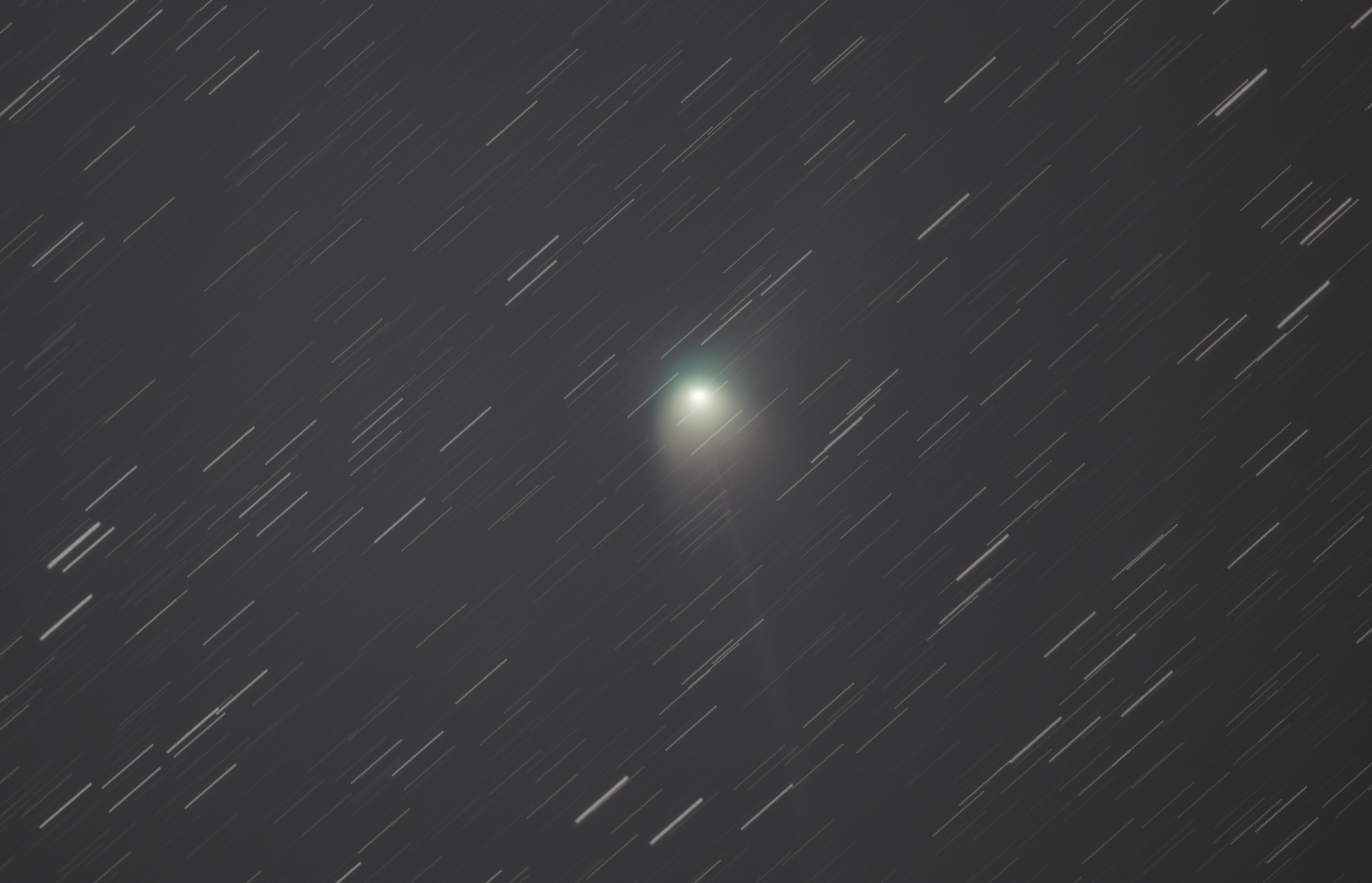
The comet on 28 January 2023, with star trails due to its relative motion in the sky

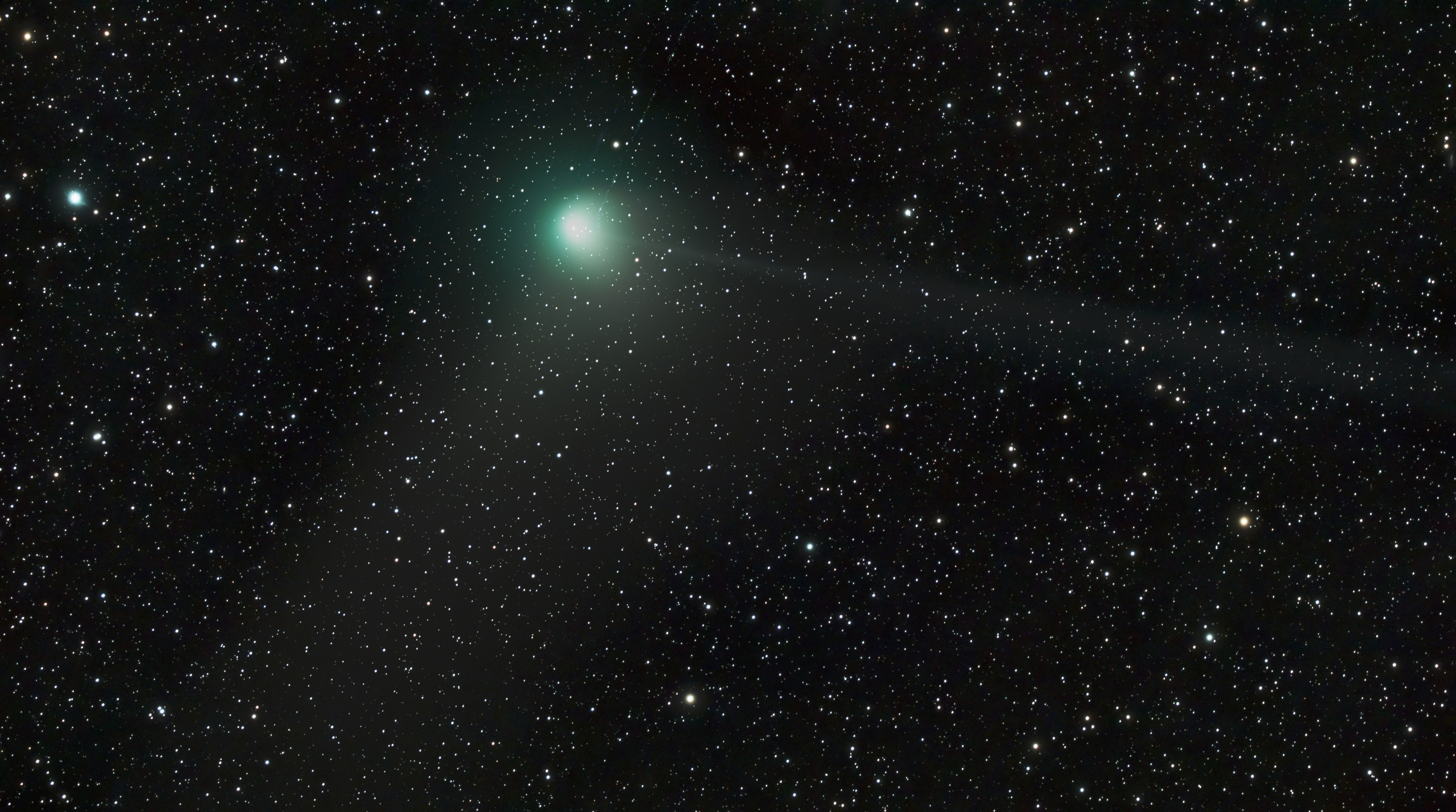
The comet on 30 January 2023

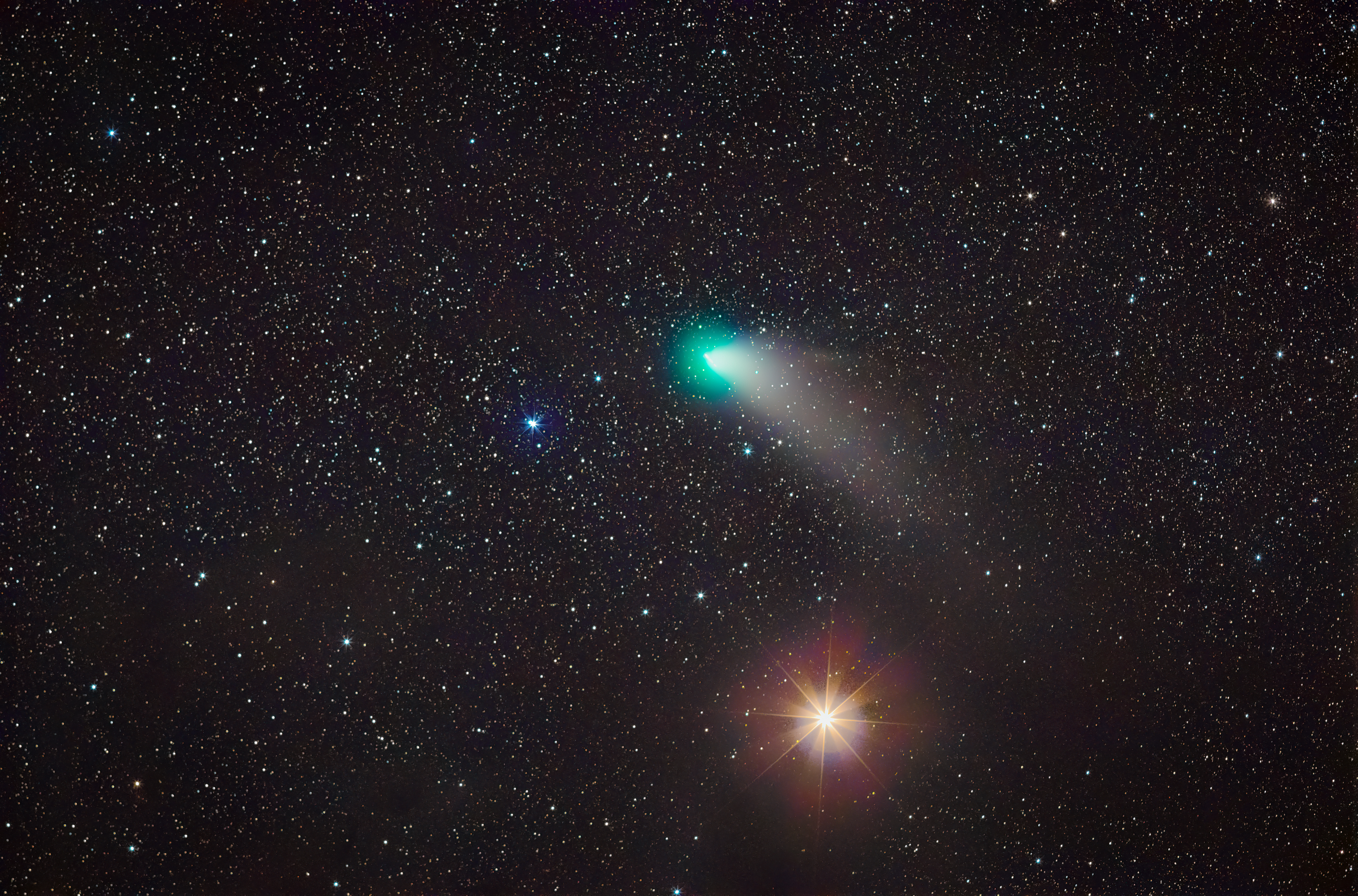
The comet in conjunction with Mars on 11 February

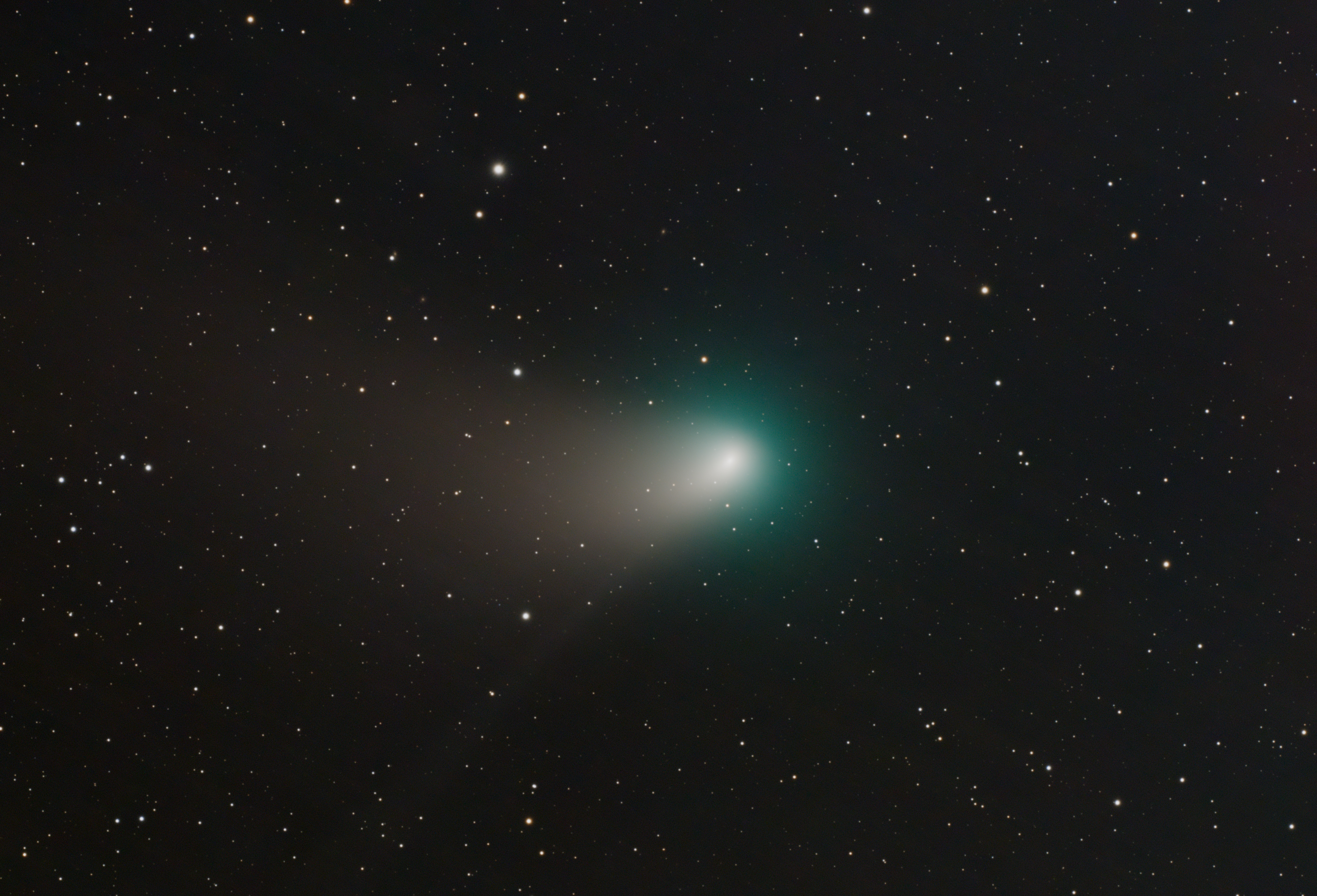
The comet on February 13, 2023, with its dust tail and ion tail visible.
