= Comet tail =

Projection of material from a comet

Diagram of a comet showing the dust tail, gas or ion tail, and the dust trail

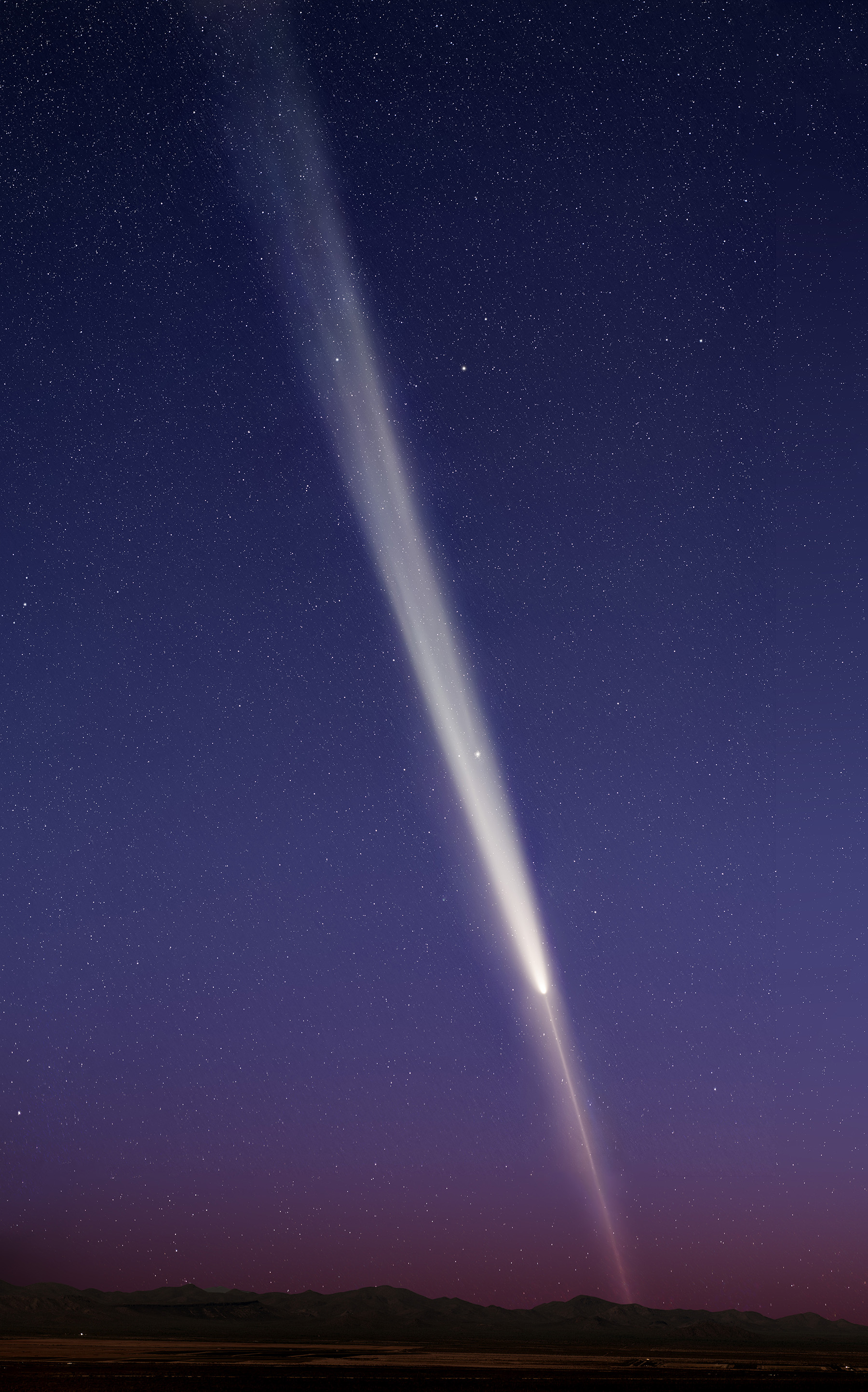
The Great Comet of 2024 with tail (left) and anti-tail visible

A comet tail is a projection of material from a comet that often becomes visible when illuminated by the Sun, while the comet passes through the inner Solar System. As a comet approaches the Sun, solar radiation causes the volatile materials within the comet to vaporize and stream out of the comet nucleus, carrying dust away with them.

Blown by the solar wind, these materials typically form two separate tails that extend outwards from the comet's orbit: the dust tail, composed of comet dust, and the gas or ion tail composed of ionized gases. They become visible through different mechanisms: the dust tail reflects sunlight directly, while the gas tail glows because of the ionization.

Occasionally the relative positions of the Earth, Sun and comet are such that part of the dust tail appears to lie in the sunward direction forming an anti-tail that extends in the direction opposite that of the main tail.

For some comets, larger dust particles that are less affected by solar wind and can persist along the comet's trajectory forming a cometary dust trail that, if it intersects with the Earth's orbit, may produce a meteor shower. Dust trails have mainly been directly observed by spacecraft but in a few instances have been captured by ground-based observers.

== Tail formation ==
Diagram of a comet's orbit showing how the gas and dust tails develop as the comet passes the Sun

In the outer Solar System, comets remain frozen and are extremely difficult or impossible to detect from Earth due to their small size. Statistical detections of inactive comet nuclei in the Kuiper belt have been reported from the Hubble Space Telescope observations, but these detections have been questioned, and have not yet been independently confirmed. As a comet approaches the inner Solar System, solar radiation causes the volatile materials within the comet to vaporize and stream out of the nucleus, carrying dust away with them. The streams of dust and gas thus released form a huge, extremely tenuous atmosphere around the comet called the coma, and the force exerted on the coma by the Sun's radiation pressure and solar wind cause an enormous tail to form, which points away from the Sun.

The streams of dust and gas each form their own distinct tails, pointing in slightly different directions. The gas or ion tail, which follows the magnetic field lines, is quite narrow and straight. After perihelion, the comet's dust tail may become strongly curved to such a degree that, as seen from the perspective of the Earth, parts of it appear to lie on the sunward side of the nucleus forming what is known as an anti-tail or anomalous tail.

== Size ==
Animation of a comet's tail

While the solid nucleus of comets is generally less than 30 km across, the coma may be larger than the Sun, and ion tails have been observed to extend 3.8 astronomical units (570 Gm; 350×10^{6} mi).

== Structure of the ion tail ==
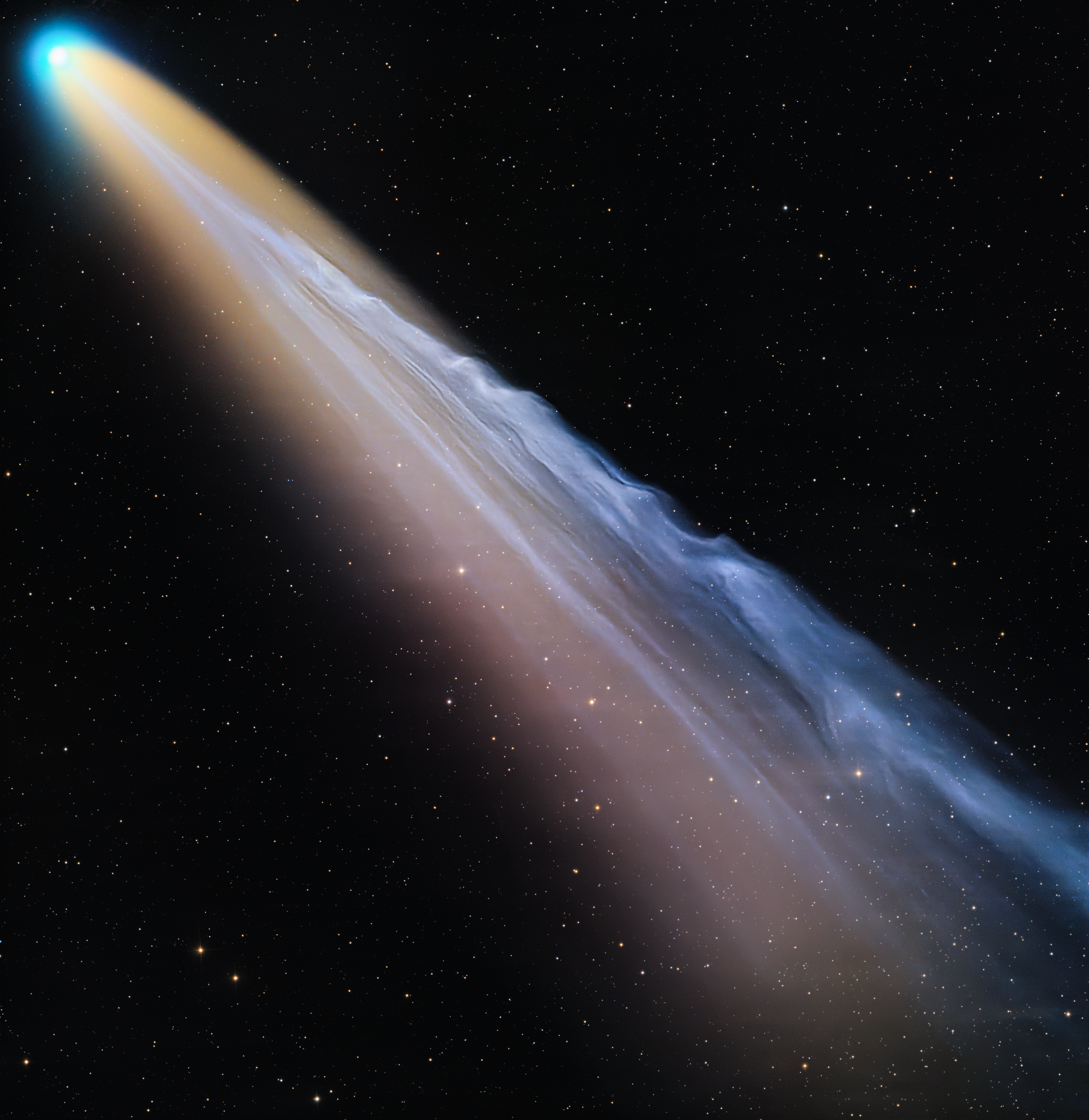
Comet C/2025 A6 (Lemmon) with its tail as seen in October 2025

The structure of the ion tail is the result of complex interactions between the Sun and the comet. Ultraviolet radiation ionize molecules in the coma, forming plasma which in turn induces a magnetosphere around the comet. The comet and its induced magnetic field form an obstacle to solar wind particles. The comet is supersonic relative to the solar wind, so a bow shock is formed upstream of the comet (i.e. facing the Sun), in the flow direction of the solar wind. In this bow shock, large concentrations of cometary ions (called "pick-up ions") congregate and act to "load" the solar magnetic field with plasma. The field lines "drape" around the comet forming the ion tail.

== Tail loss ==
Comet Encke loses its tail.

If the ion tail loading is sufficient, then the magnetic field lines are squeezed together to the point where, at some distance along the ion tail, magnetic reconnection occurs. This leads to a "tail disconnection event". This has been observed on a number of occasions, notable among which was on April 20, 2007, when the ion tail of comet Encke was completely severed as the comet passed through a coronal mass ejection. This event was observed by the STEREO spacecraft. A disconnection event was also seen with C/2009 R1 (McNaught) on May 26, 2010.

== Analogues ==
Venus possesses a similar tail due to the induced magnetosphere formed by interaction of the solar wind with the venusian atmosphere. On January 29, 2013, ESA scientists reported that the ionosphere of the planet Venus streams outwards in a manner similar to "the ion tail seen streaming from a comet under similar conditions." While Mercury lacks an atmosphere, the MESSENGER mission observed magnesium and sodium flowing off the planet, along the magnetic field lines trailing behind the planet, making them the primary components of Mercury's magnetotail.

== Dust tail structure ==
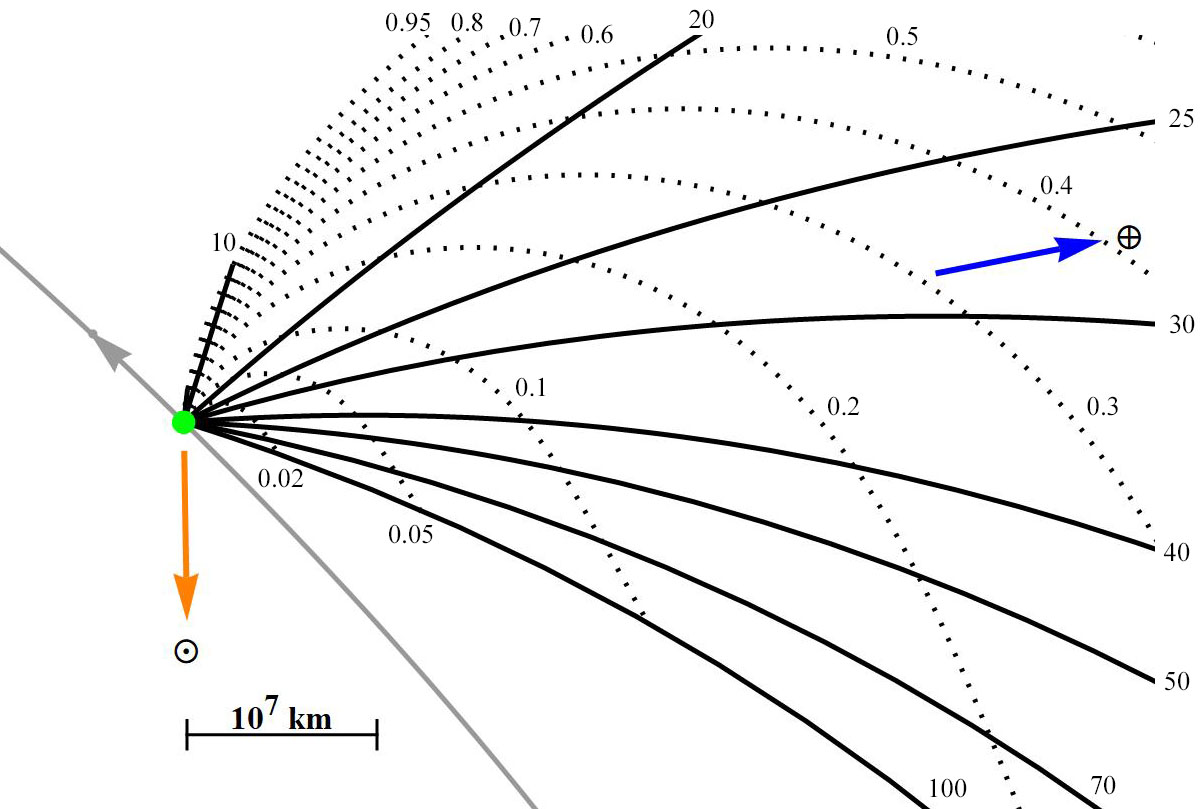
Finson-Probstein diagram for comet C/1956 R1 (Arend-Roland) on 28 April 1957 looking down on the orbital plane

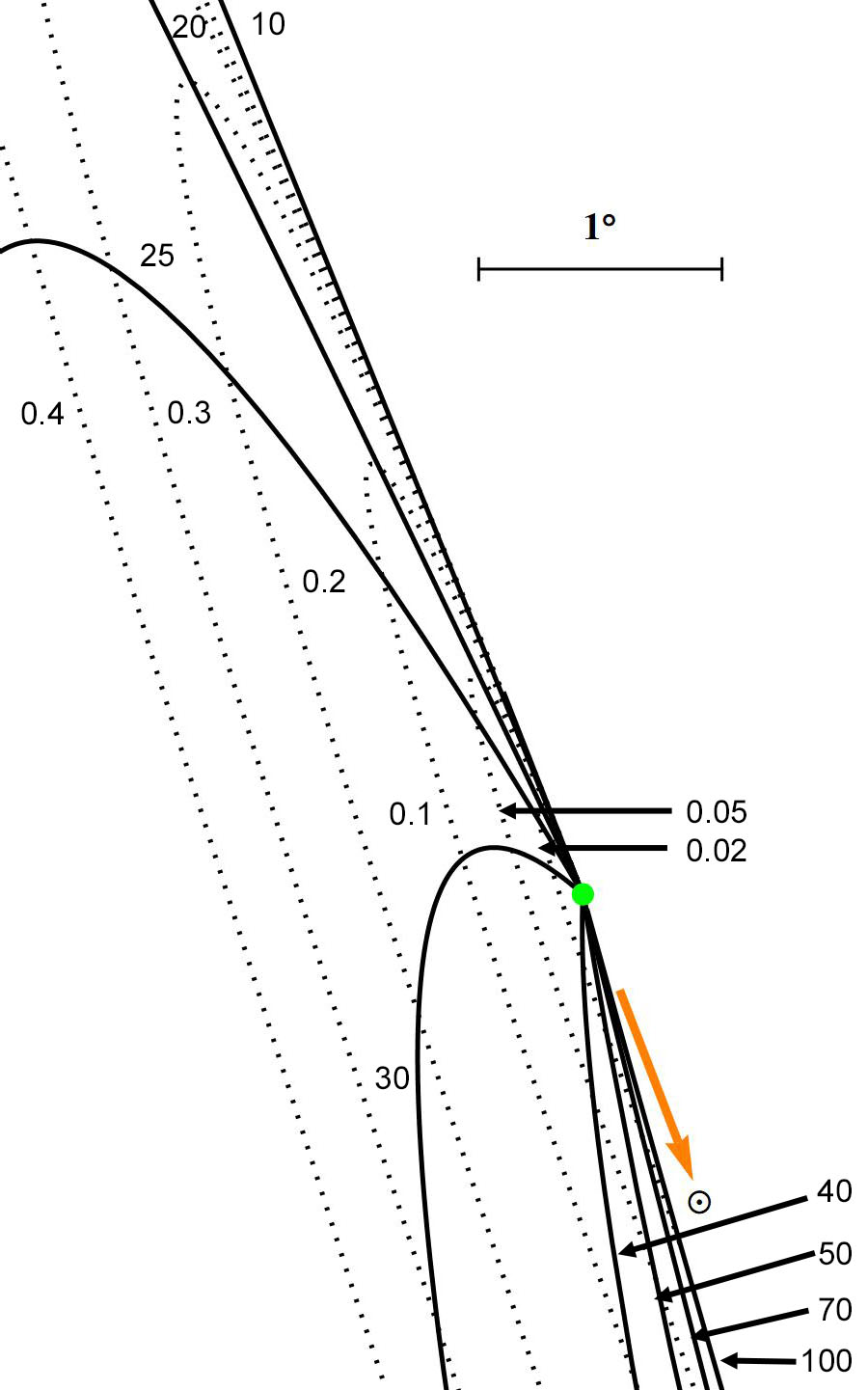
Finson-Probstein diagram for comet C/1956 R1 (Arend-Roland) on 28 April 1957 as seen from Earth

Dust particles emitted from a comet nucleus are acted upon by the attractive force of gravity, $F_\textrm{grav}$, and the repulsive force of solar radiation, $F_\textrm{rad}$. Both of the forces vary as the inverse square of the distance from the Sun. The net effect is that an emitted dust particle experiences and effective reduction in the force of gravity parameterized by $\beta = F_\textrm{rad}/F_\textrm{grav}$ and on leaving the neighborhood of the comet nucleus follows its own individual Keplerian orbit. Larger, heavier dust particles are less affected by solar radiation pressure and are characterized by smaller values of $\beta$.

In 1968, Finson and Probstein developed an effective model for the observable properties of a comet tail. Their method relies on combining a function for the rate of dust production from the nucleus with functions for the size distribution of particles and their ejection velocity distribution. They applied their methods to comet C/1956 R1 (Arend-Roland). Their first paper laid out a framework for computing the trajectories of the comet and ejected dust particles. Sekanina employed this approach to successfully predict the appearance of anti-tails in comets C/1973 E1 (Kohoutek) and C/1975 V2 (Bradfield).

The Finson-Probstein (F-P) diagram on the right is for Comet Arend-Roland on April 28, 1957 about 2 days after the Earth crossed the comet's orbital plane. The view is looking down on the orbital plane. The solid lines are synchrones which represent streams of particles emitted at the same time with smaller, lighter particles (those with larger $\beta$) travelling further from the nucleus. The synchrones are labeled with the time in days since their emission. The dotted lines represent syndynes which connect dust particles with the same value of $\beta$ emitted at different times in the past. The synchrones are labeled with $\beta$. The blue and orange arrows indicate the directions of the Earth and Sun respectively. The comet's orbital path is plotted in gray.

The other F-P diagram shows the view as seen from Earth. Both F-P diagrams were previously plotted by Sekanina. Notice, from this perspective, that part of the dust tail appears in the sunward direction from the nucleus which produces an anti-tail. There is a considerable piling up of older synchrones producing the observed sharp edge on to the anti-tail. Younger synchrones are also crowded together while those of intermediate ages are spread out over a broad area of sky making the tail fainter in this region and giving the impression that the it is split into a main branch and a sunward branch.

== Neck-line structure ==
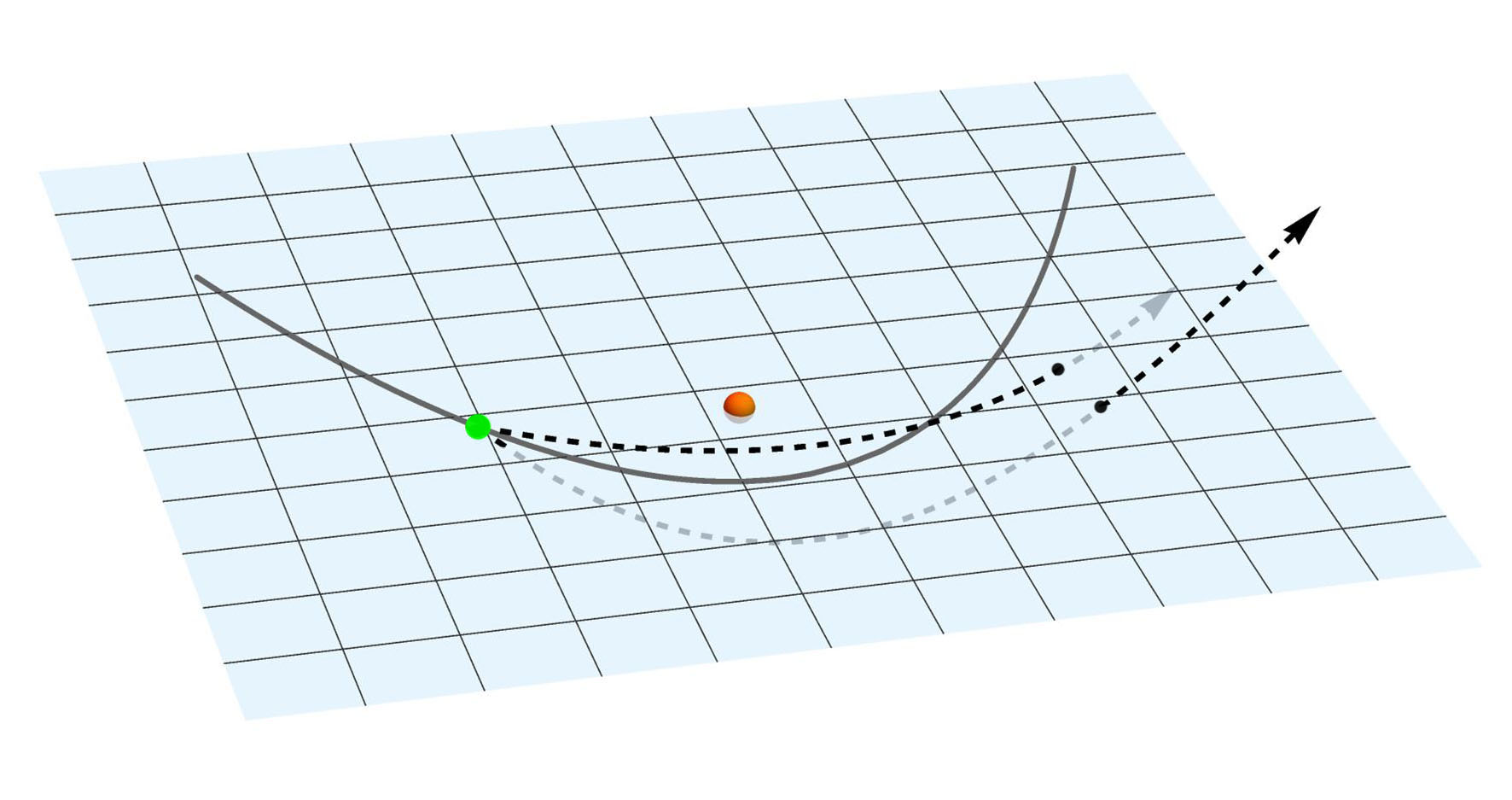
Trajectories of heavy dust particles ejected from the comet's nucleus

Animation showing the evolution of a shell of dust particles with beta=0.03 ejected from comet C/1956 R1 (Arend-Roland) at a speed of 360 m/s on March 17, 1957 at 21:36 UT

Dust particles ejected isotropically from the comets nucleus follow their own Keplerian orbit, each specified by their own set of orbital elements. The orbits are, in general, inclined to the comet's orbital plane and the particles will initially move away from it. However, upon reaching a point in their orbit on the other side of Sun from where they were ejected, they will have returned and cross the orbital plane. This happens when the dust particle's true anomaly, $\nu$, has increased by 180$^\circ$ ($\pi$ radians) from its initial value on ejection. The crossing is described as reaching its second node. This behavior is represented stylistically in the diagram. In it the Sun is the orange ball and the comet's nucleus is shown in green. The orbital plane is shaded blue and the comet's orbital is shown in gray. The ejected shell of dust particles remains spherical for only a short period of time and soon becomes ellipsoidal. While continuing to expand in directions parallel to the orbital plane it reaches a maximum extent perpendicular to the plane before contracting to become a planar ellipse as the dust particles pass through the orbital plane at their second nodes. After that the ellipsoid again expands. The animation shows a Monte-Carlo simulation for a shell of 2,000 dust particles with $\beta$=0.03 ejected by C/1956 R1 (Arend-Roland) at a speed of 360 m/s on 17 March 1957 at 21:36 UT as seen by an observer following the comet outside of its orbit and looking in the direction of the Sun. The time since ejection, $\Delta T$, and true anomaly, $\nu$, are displayed.

Shells of dust particles with different values of $\beta$ form their own distinct planar ellipses slightly displaced from one another and are known collectively as the neck-line structure (NLS). A couple of notable features of these ellipses. Its outer edge is formed by particles ejected parallel to the orbital plane. A particle with the same value of $\beta$ emitted from the nucleus at zero relative velocity would lie in the geometric center of the ellipse. The center of the ellipse therefore sits at the intersection of the associated synchrone and syndyne. Typically therefore much of the NLS is embedded in the normal dust tail. The NLS can only form after perihelion passage and its flatness means that it is best seen edge on as the Earth crosses the comet's orbital plane.

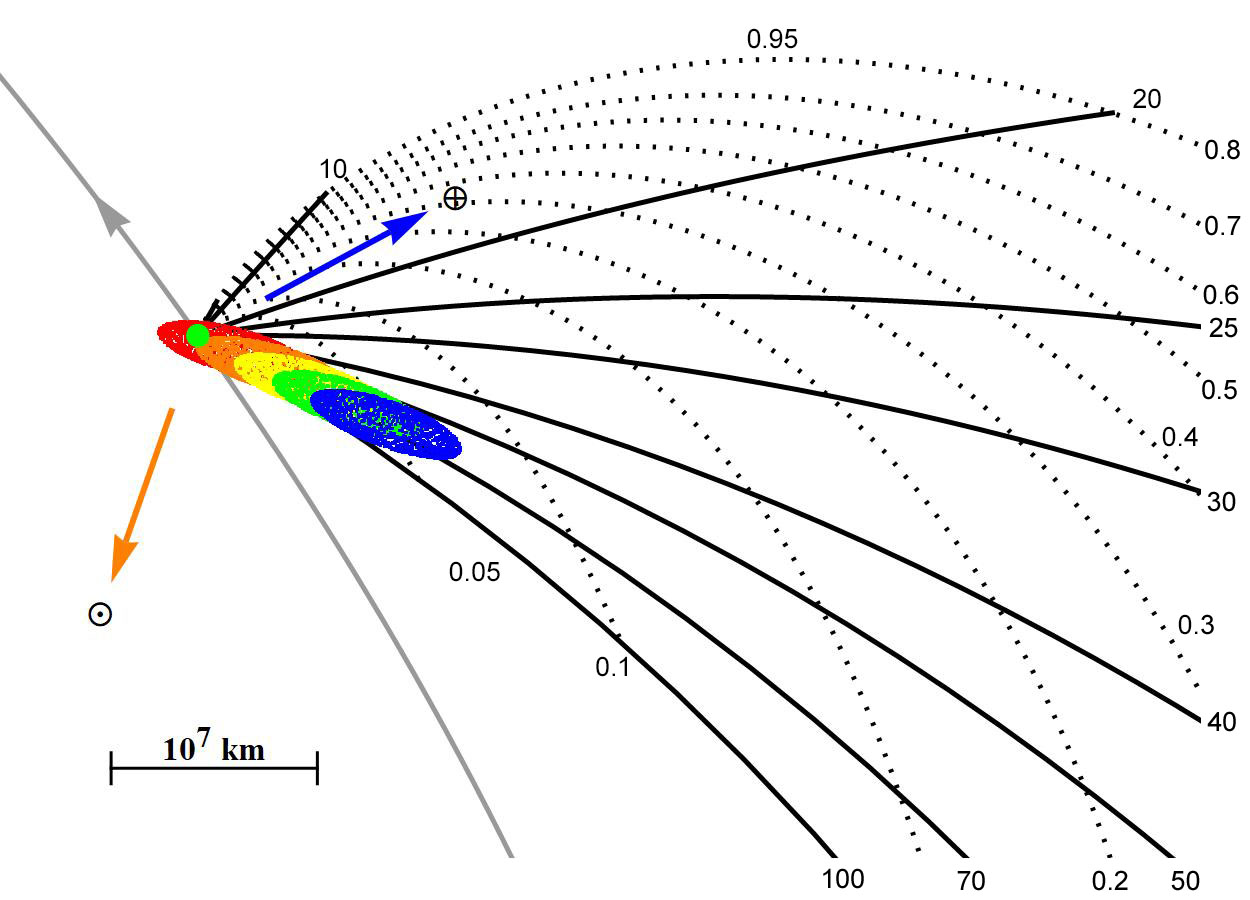
Finson-Probstein diagram and neck-line structure for comet C/2023 A3 (Tsuchinshan-ATLAS) on 14 October 2024 looking down on the orbital plane

The F-P diagram for comet C/2023 A3 (Tsuchinshan-ATLAS) is shown for 14 October 2024 at 18:30 UT when the Earth crossed its orbital plane. Also shown are red, orange, yellow, green and blue planar ellipses for dust particles with $\beta$ = 0.01, 0.02, 0.03, 0.04 and 0.05 respectively ejected 64.5 days earlier. Most of the NLS lies outside of the comet's orbit (on the anti-sunward side), but some of the heaviest dust particles lie in a shorter spike on the sunward side. The sunward spike is short (a few arc mins to half a degree) while the tailward feature can be much longer (several degrees). Pansecchi et al coined the term "sunward spike" (SWS) for that part of the NLS falling on the sunward side of the orbit and ray-shaped structure (RSS) for the remainder.

Because it is generally seen projected on the normal dust tail, early attempts required careful microdensitometer measurements of photographic plates.

== Anti-tail ==
The term "anti-tail" can be ambiguous, but here will be used to refer to any tail-like extension seen as emanating from the comet's nucleus in the sunward direction. There are a number of mechanisms that cause a sunward anti-tail to appear.

=== Anti-tail by projection ===
Comet C/1956 R1 (Arend-Roland) in 1957 reached naked-eye visibility in evening sky of late April and early May 1957. Around April 25th it developed of a narrow sunward spike that could be traced up to 15$^\circ$ from the nucleus. Having photographed the comet with the 24-36 inch Schmidt telescope from Portage Lake, Michigan, F. D. Miller suggested that the spike was in fact a fan-shaped tail seen edge on as the Earth crossed the comet’s orbital plane. The narrowness of the sunward spike implied that its constituent dust particles were emitted from the nucleus with only a very small relative velocity.

The F-P diagrams above demonstrate the conditions that gave rise the sunward anti-tail. Following the comet's perihelion passage on 7 April 1957 the synchrones became strongly curved to such a degree that, for an Earth-based observer, they appear to be on the sunward side. This is a consequence of the relative positions of the Earth, Sun and the comet. In reality the dust-tail particles lie in a thin sheet close to the comet's orbital plane on the anti-sunward side of the orbit. Their visibility is enhanced when seen edge on which happened on 25 April when the Earth passed through Arend-Roland's orbital plane. The anti-tail in this case is a trick of perspective.

Projection is the most common mechanism causing an anti-tail to appear.

=== Anti-tail from the neck-line structure ===
As shown above, relatively large, heavy particles ejected from the nucleus with sufficient velocity can cross the comet's orbital plane at their second node at a point inside the orbit forming the SWS. If the Earth is in the right position it will be seen as a true sunward spike typically be less than half a degree in length.

The remainder of the neck-line structure, the RSS, is generally embedded in the comet's normal dust tail and can participate in the formation of an anti-tail by projection. It may enhance the visibility of the sunward spike when it is present, which is not always the case. For example, comet C/2022 E3 (ZTF) displayed a long sunward anti-tail when the Earth crossed it's orbital plane on 23 January 2023. The true anomaly, $\nu$ was just 12.25$^\circ$. To form a neck-line structure dust particles would have had to have been emitted when the comet was nearly 100 AU from the Sun and inactive. Hence, no neck-line structure could have been present.

Comet C/1995 O1 (Hale-Bopp) was visible for 18 months, and its neck-line structure (NLS) was an exceptional case. On 3 January 1998, the comet was on its outward track sporting a short, straight normal tail directed away from the Sun and Earth. The dust particles forming the NLS would have been ejected nearly a year earlier which is much longer ago than the ejection time for particles that typically make up the normal dust tail. The NLS had expanded to a large size, was spatially well-separated from the normal tail and crossed the comet's orbital path nearly at right angles. Photographs taken by the 1 m Schmidt Telescope at the ESO in La Silla, Chile showed a long narrow streak of material running from the sunward side of the nucleus through and beyond the normal tail.

=== Anti-tail from an anisotropic snow line ===
A phenomenon leading to the formation of a sunward anti-tail was observed for the first time in the interstellar comet 3I/ATLAS. The comet's nucleus is more strongly heated on the side facing the Sun which leads to an increased rate of sublimation of the ices on its surface. This in turn leads to the ejection of larger ice grains that persist longer before sublimating than those ejected elsewhere. and produces an asymmetric snow line that extends further in the direction of the Sun.

Other notable comets that displayed anti-tails include Kohoutek in 1973, Halley's Comet (1P/Halley), C/1999 H1 (Lee) in 1999, Lulin in 2009, PANSTARRS and 12P/Pons–Brooks and C/2023 A3 Tsuchinshan–ATLAS in 2024.

== Dust trails ==
Cometary dust trails are long-lived streams of large grains (>0.1mm) ejected from comet nuclei at low velocities and closely follow its orbital trajectory. These large grains are more efficient at emitting heat than scattering sunlight at visible wavelengths. Dust trails were first observed directly by the Infrared Astronomical Satellite (IRAS) and later by the Spitzer Space Telescope. As of 2021 there were 44 comets that were known to have dust trails.

The wide-field views and long cointegration times provided by the Transiting Exoplanet Survey Satellite (TESS) have led to several dust trail discoveries and will potentially yield many more.

Some ground-based observers have succeeded in capturing images of cometary dust trails.

Dust trails that intersect the Earth's orbit can produce recurrent meteor showers.
