= C/2020 V2 (ZTF) =

Non-periodic comet

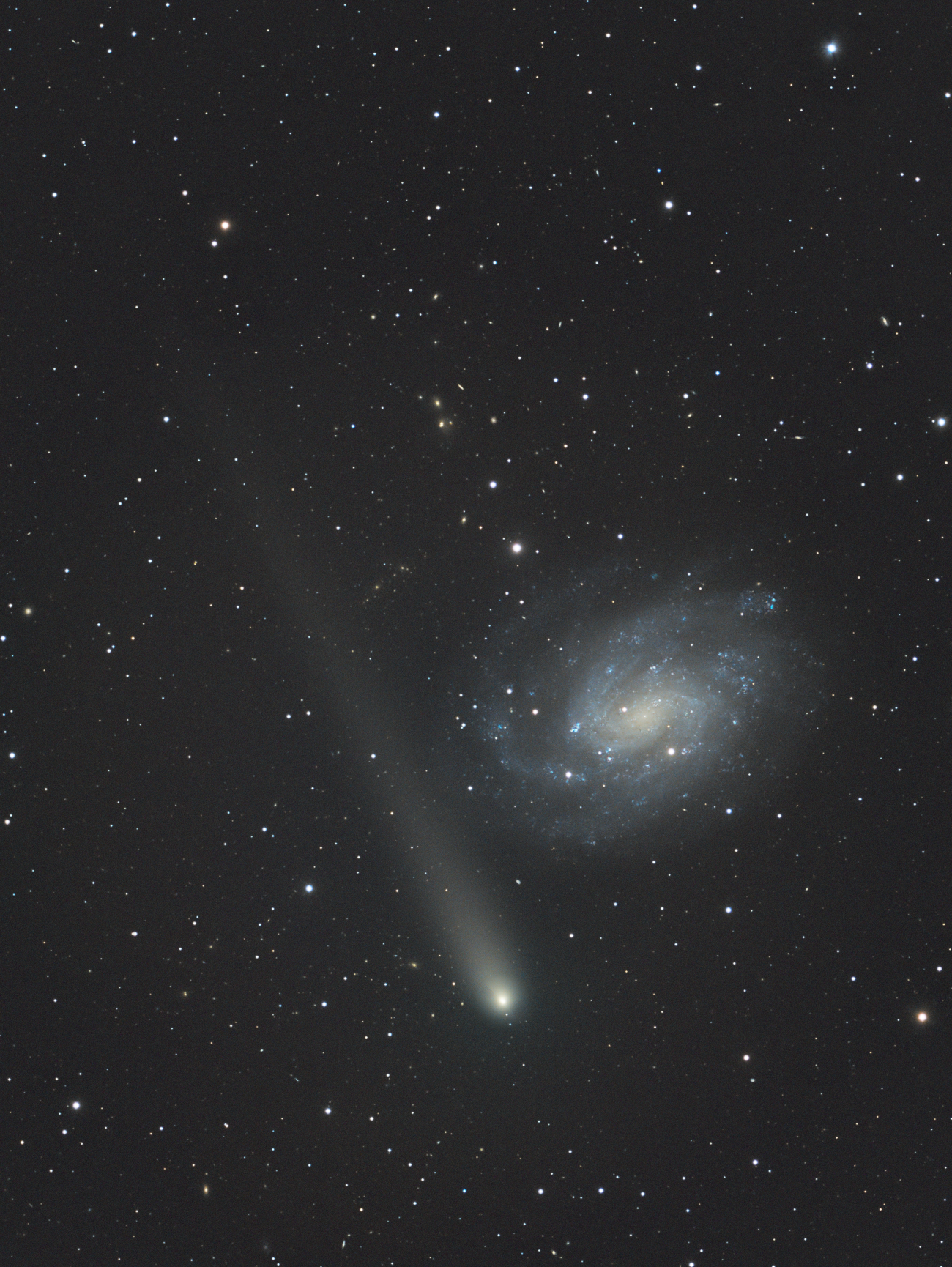
- Photograph of C/2020 V2 (ZTF) and NGC 300 taken from Queensland, Australia on 14 October 2023

Discovery
- Discovery site: Zwicky Transient Facility
- Discovery date: 2 November 2020

Orbital characteristics
- Epoch: 13 September 2022 (JD 2459835.5)
- Observation arc: 5.37 years
- Earliest precovery date: 18 April 2020
- Number of observations: 5,740
- Aphelion: ~72,700 AU (inbound)
- Perihelion: 2.228 AU
- Semi-major axis: ~36,400 AU (inbound)
- Eccentricity: 0.99994 (inbound); 1.00042 (outbound)
- Orbital period: ~6.9 million years (inbound)
- Inclination: 131.61°
- Longitude of ascending node: 212.37°
- Argument of periapsis: 162.42°
- Mean anomaly: –0.002°
- Last perihelion: 8 May 2023
- Earth MOID: 1.260 AU
- Jupiter MOID: 2.601 AU

Physical characteristics
- Mean radius: 1.1 ± 0.1 km (0.684 ± 0.062 mi)
- Spectral type: (B–V) = 0.77±0.04; (V–R) = 0.43±0.04; (R–I) = 0.42±0.06; (B–R) = 1.19±0.04
- Comet total magnitude (M1): 8.7

C/2020 V2 (ZTF) is a non-periodic comet that was first observed in November 2020. It is the first of seven comets discovered by the Zwicky Transient Facility as of 2025.

== Observational history ==
The comet was first discovered as a 19th-magnitude object on images taken by the Zwicky Transient Facility on 2 November 2020. Precovery observations as far back as 18 April 2020 were also reported to the Minor Planet Center. Following its discovery, Gennadiy Borisov and the Palomar Observatory independently observed the comet during the second week of November 2020.

The comet was largely only visible through large telescopes and binoculars throughout its appearance. It passed near the galaxy NGC 3488 on 21 October 2022, the star Polaris on 22 December 2022, and it was near the Messier 103 cluster over a month later on 25 January 2023. By June 2023, the comet was located within the constellation Aries. As it continues to move south in pre-dawn skies, the comet reached magnitude 9.1 as it passes through the constellation Eridanus throughout August 2023. On 14 October 2023, the comet was seen close to the galaxy NGC 300, now faded to magnitude 10.0.

The Asiago Astrophysical Observatory made detailed imaging and spectroscopic observations of the comet in July 2024 as a magnitude 10.0 object in the night sky.

== Physical characteristics ==
Between December 2022 and August 2023, the TRAPPIST telescopes were used to determine the comet's dust and gas production rates as it moves within the inner Solar System. Traces of OH, CN, C_{2}, and C_{3} were detected on 15 December 2022, but only the first three chemicals were present by 29 August 2023.

Sodium-emission lines were detected from the comet in January 2023.

Despite being a dynamically new comet from the Oort cloud with an absolute total magnitude (8.7) lower than the expected Bortle survival limit, the comet remained intact throughout its most recent apparition. Photometric studies in 2025 revealed that its nucleus has an effective radius of around 1.1±0.1 km. It is expected to be ejected from the Solar System on its outbound trajectory.
