= C/2011 L4 (PanSTARRS) =

Non-periodic comet

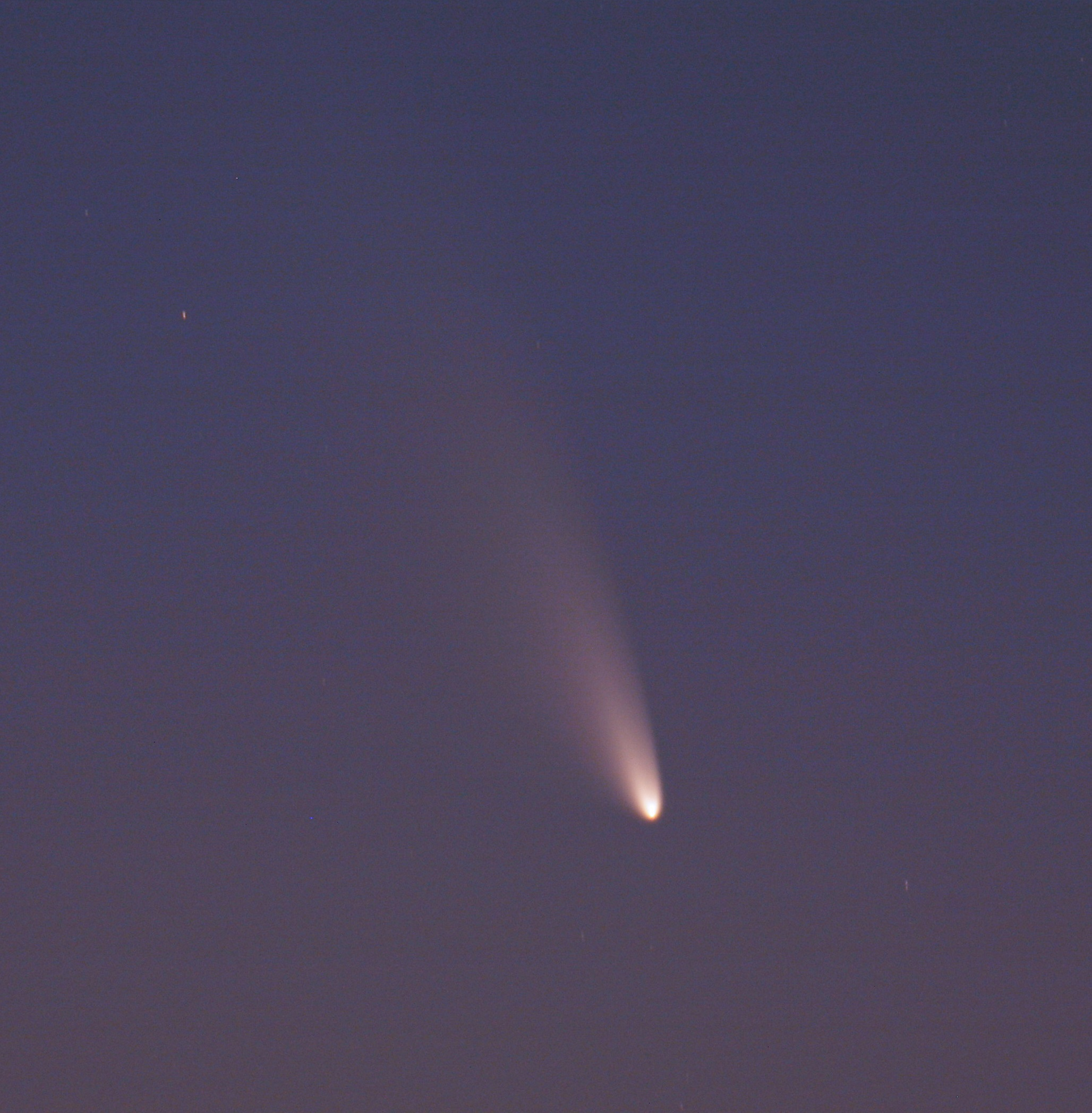
- Image of Comet PanSTARRS by Gingin Observatory

Discovery
- Discovered by: Pan-STARRS
- Discovery date: 6 June 2011

Orbital characteristics
- Epoch: 20 March 2012 (JD 2456006.5)
- Observation arc: 3.27 years
- Number of observations: 5413
- Orbit type: Oort cloud
- Aphelion: 68000 AU (inbound); 4500 AU (outbound)
- Perihelion: 0.30161 AU (q)
- Eccentricity: 1.000087
- Orbital period: Millions of years (inbound); ~107,000 yr (outbound solution for epoch 2050)
- Max. orbital speed: 76.7 km/s (172,000 mph)
- Inclination: 84.199°
- Last perihelion: 10 March 2013
- Jupiter MOID: 0.17 AU

Physical characteristics
- Dimensions: 1.0–2.4 km (0.62–1.49 mi)
- Synodic rotation period: 5 hours
- Geometric albedo: 0.04
- Comet total magnitude (M1): 5.5
- Apparent magnitude: 1.0 (2013 apparition)

C/2011 L4 (PanSTARRS), also known as Comet PANSTARRS, is a non-periodic comet discovered in June 2011 that became visible to the naked eye when it was near perihelion in March 2013. It was discovered using the Pan-STARRS telescope located near the summit of Haleakalā, on the island of Maui in Hawaii.

== Observational history ==
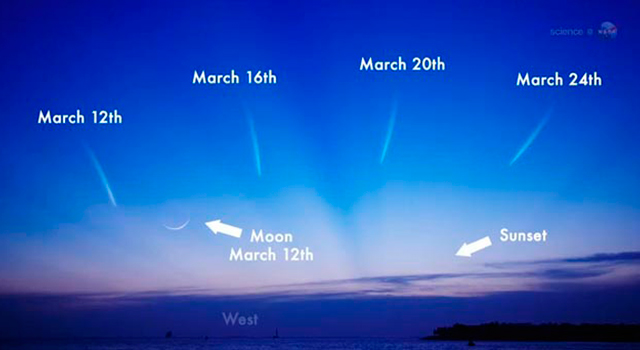
For Northern Hemisphere observers, Comet PANSTARRS was near the crescent Moon on 12/13 March 2013.

Comet C/2011 L4 was still 7.9 AU from the Sun with an apparent magnitude of 19 when it was discovered in June 2011. By early May 2012, it had brightened to magnitude 13.5, and could be seen visually when using a large amateur telescope from a dark site. In October 2012, the coma (expanding tenuous dust atmosphere) was estimated to be about 120,000 kilometers (75,000 miles) in diameter. C/2011 L4 was spotted without optical aid on 7 February 2013 at a magnitude of ~6. Comet PANSTARRS was visible from both hemispheres in the first weeks of March, and passed closest to Earth on 5 March 2013 at a distance of 1.09 AU. It came to perihelion (closest approach to the Sun) on 10 March 2013. Original estimates predicted that C/2011 L4 would brighten to roughly apparent magnitude 0 (roughly the brightness of Alpha Centauri A or Vega). An estimate in October 2012 predicted that it might brighten to magnitude −4 (roughly equivalent to Venus). In January 2013 there was a noticeable brightening slowdown that suggested that it may only brighten to magnitude +1. During February the brightness curve showed a further slowdown suggesting a perihelion magnitude of around +2.

However, a study using the secular light curve indicates that C/2011 L4 had a "slowdown event" when it was 3.6 AU (540 million km) from the Sun at a magnitude 5.6. The brightness increase rate decreased and the estimated magnitude at perihelion was predicted as +3.5. Comet Halley would be magnitude −1.0 at the same perihelion distance. The same study concluded that C/2011 L4 is very young and belongs to the class of "baby comets" (i.e. those with a photometric age of less than 4 comet years).

When C/2011 L4 reached perihelion in March 2013, the actual peak magnitude turned out to be around +1, as estimated by various observers all over the planet. However, its low altitude over the horizon made these estimates difficult and subject to significant uncertainties, both because of the lack of suitable reference stars in the area and the need for differential atmospheric extinction corrections. As of mid-March 2013, due to the brightness of twilight and low elevation in the sky, C/2011 L4 was best seen in binoculars about 40 minutes after sunset. On 17–18 March, C/2011 L4 was near the 2.8-magnitude star Algenib (Gamma Pegasi). On 22 April, it was near Beta Cassiopeiae. On 12–14 May, it was near Gamma Cephei. C/2011 L4 continued moving North until 28 May. The comet may have had a sodium tail as Comet Hale–Bopp had.

== Physical characteristics ==
=== Nucleus size ===
Dust and gas production suggests the comet nucleus is roughly 1 kilometer (0.62 mi) in diameter, while based on the absolute nuclear magnitude and a geometric albedo of 0.04 the diameter of the nucleus is over 2.4 km (1.5 mi). A method based on coma magnitude decay function estimated the effective radius at 2.317±0.190 km.

=== Rotation period ===
Light curve measurements taken while the comet was in a brief, lesser active state between July and August 2013 revealed that C/2011 L4 (PanSTARRS) is a fast rotator, spinning on its axis once every five hours.

== Orbit ==
Comet C/2011 L4 (PanSTARRS) likely took millions of years to come from the Oort cloud. After leaving the planetary region of the Solar System, the post-perihelion orbital period (epoch 2050) is estimated to be roughly 107,000 years.

== Gallery ==
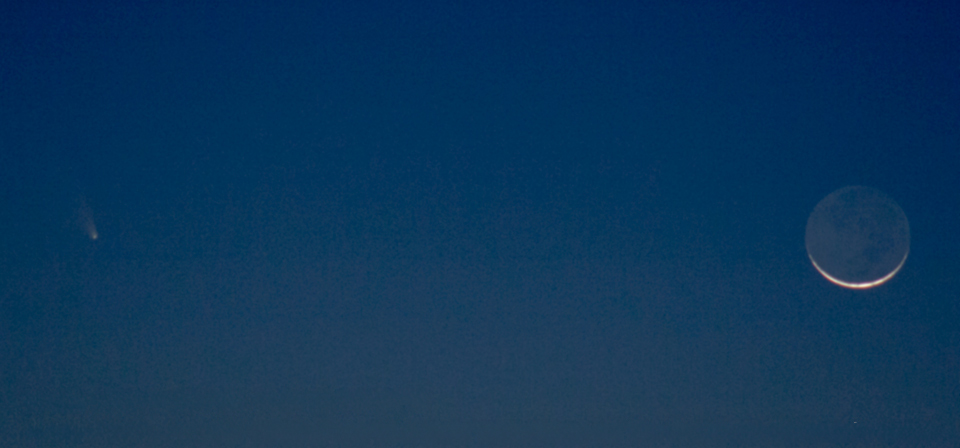
Comet PANSTARRS as observed from Southern California, USA, about 3° east of the new crescent Moon

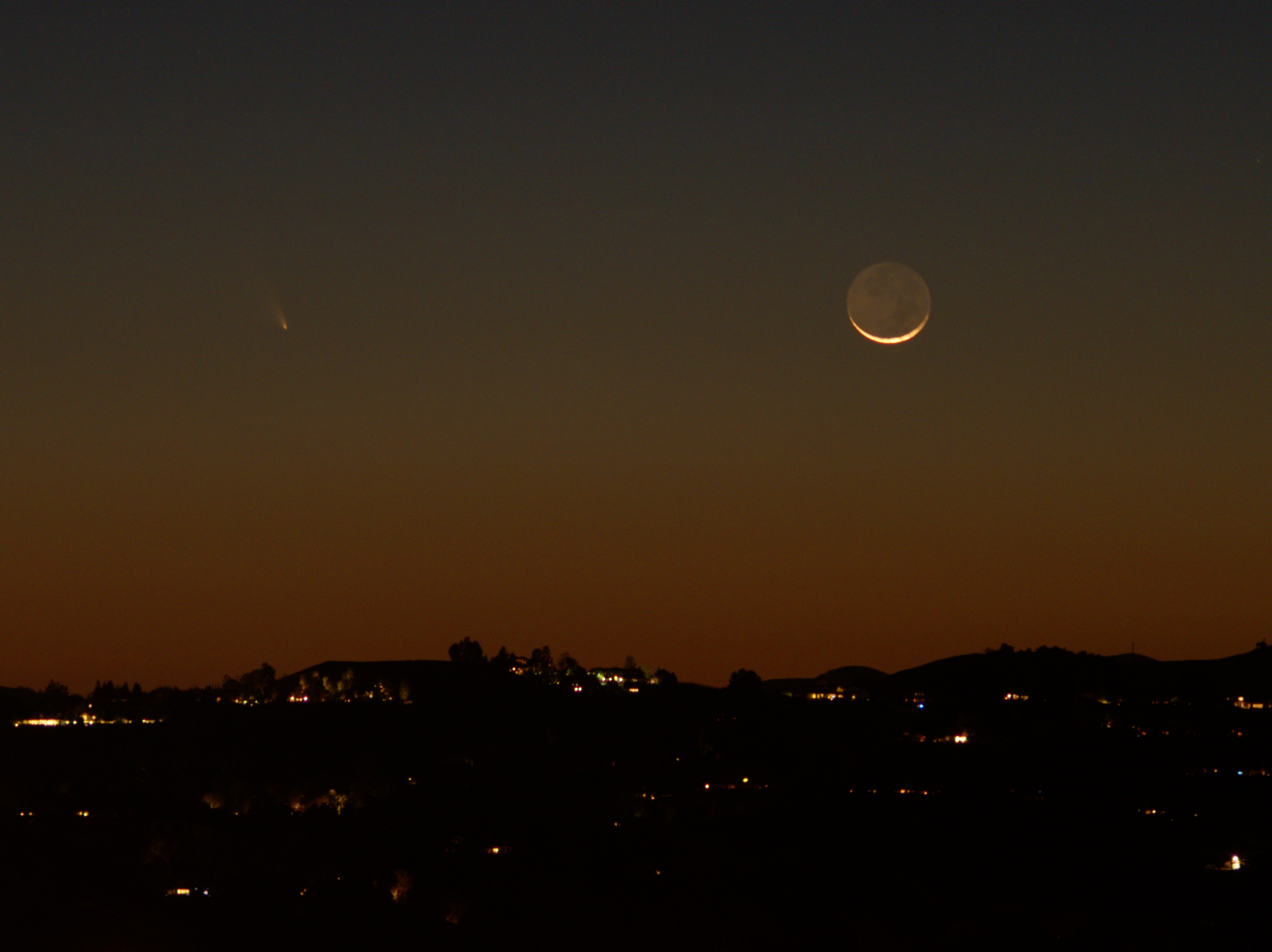
Photo taken 12 March 2013 in Woodland Hills, Los Angeles, USA.

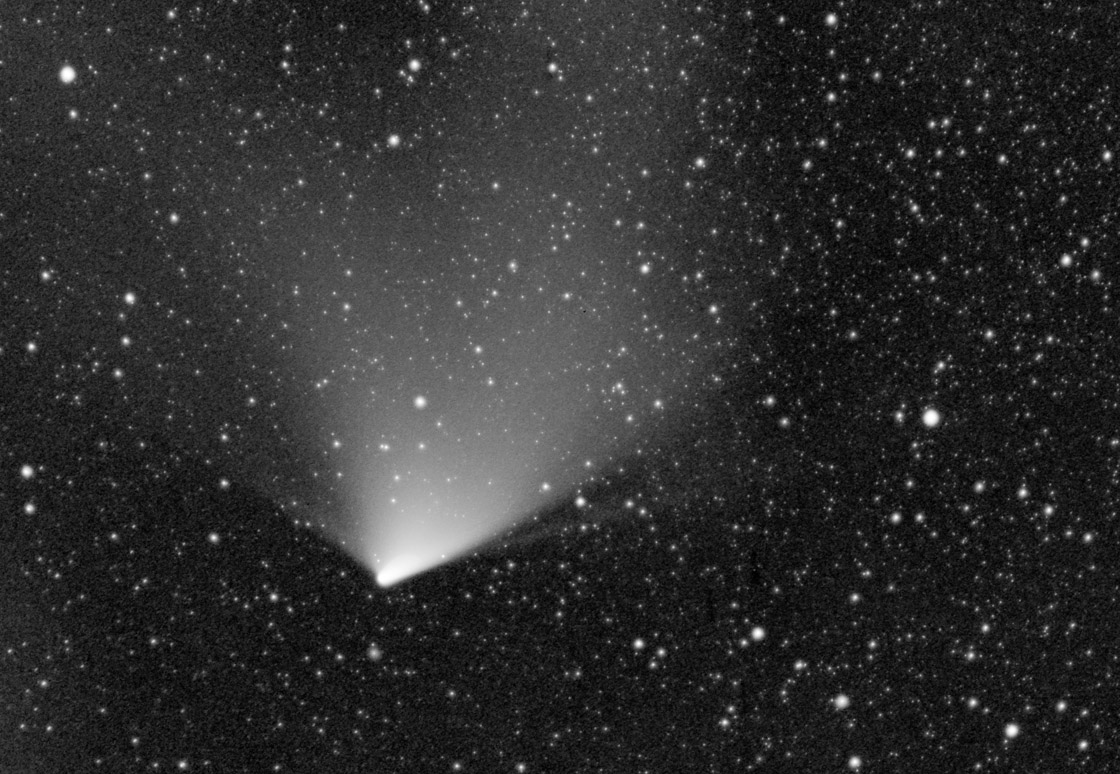
Comet C/2011 L4 (PanSTARRS) with a fan-shaped tail 2013-03-24 17:00UT in Special Astrophysical Observatory of the Russian Academy of Science near the village of Nizhny Arkhyz.

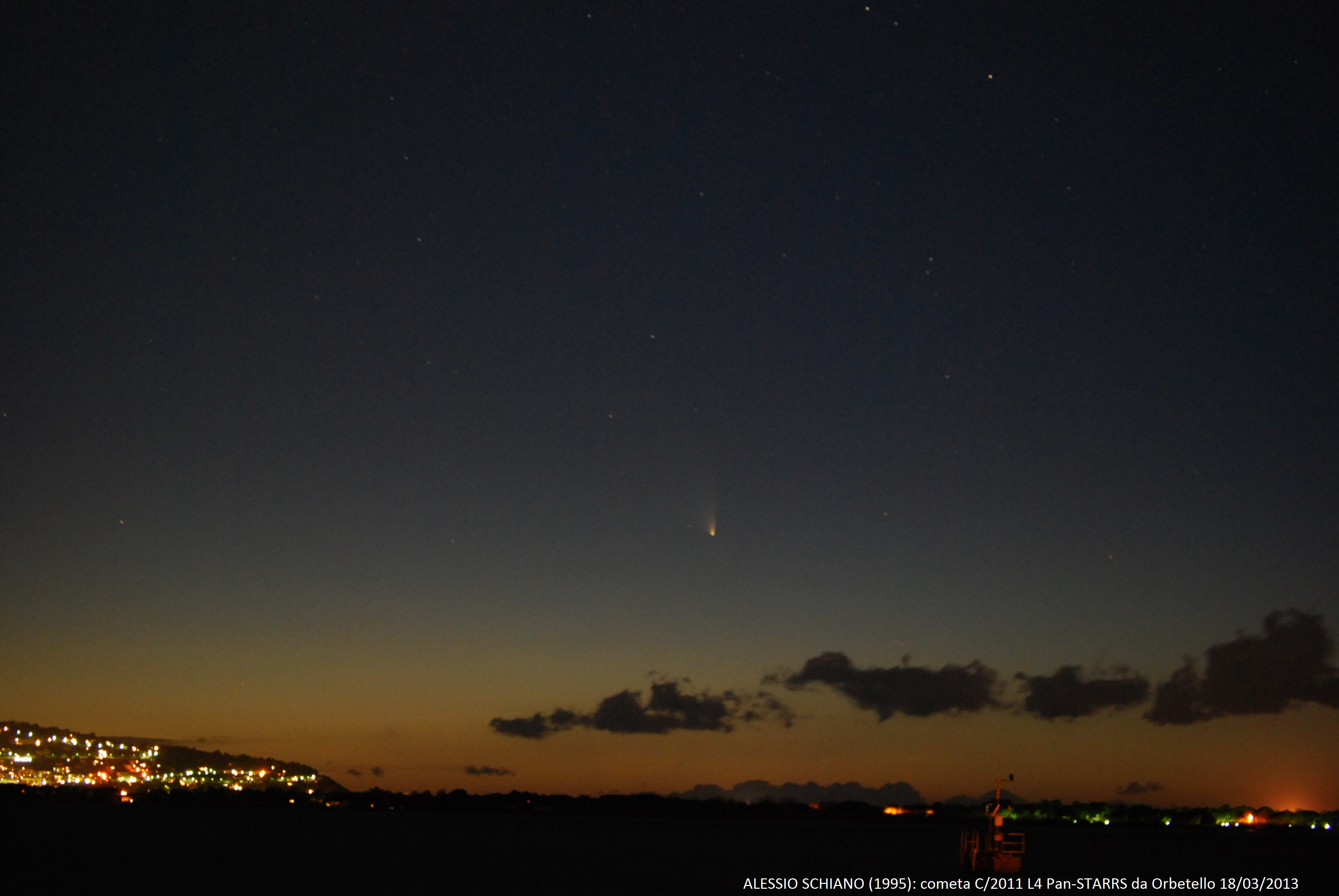
Photo taken 18 March 2013, at Orbetello, Italy).

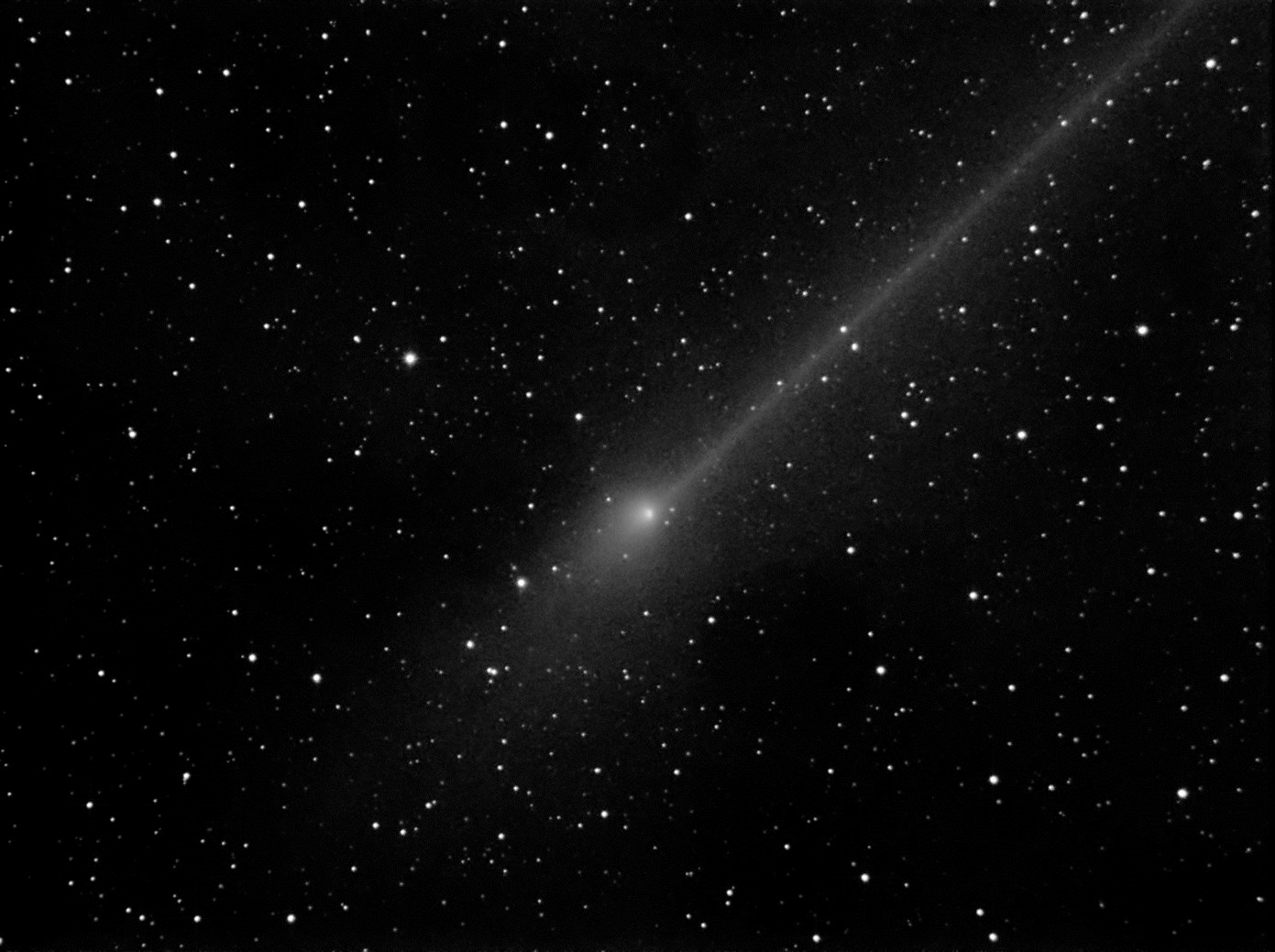
Photo taken by John Maclean at the Norman Lockyer Observatory, Sidmouth, Devon.

== See also ==
- C/2012 S1 (ISON) – a highly anticipated comet that disintegrated near perihelion in November 2013.
