= List of Pan-STARRS discoveries =

Pan-STARRS is the Panoramic Survey Telescope and Rapid Response System in Hawaii, United States

Objects discovered by Pan-STARRS include:

== Periodic comets ==
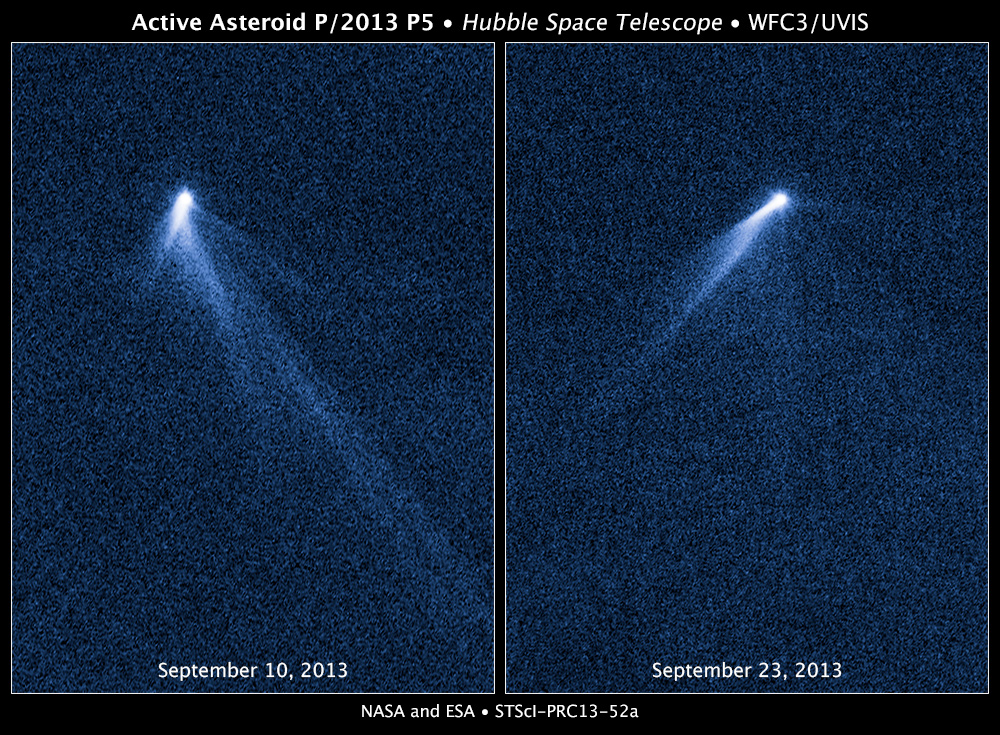
311P/PANSTARRS

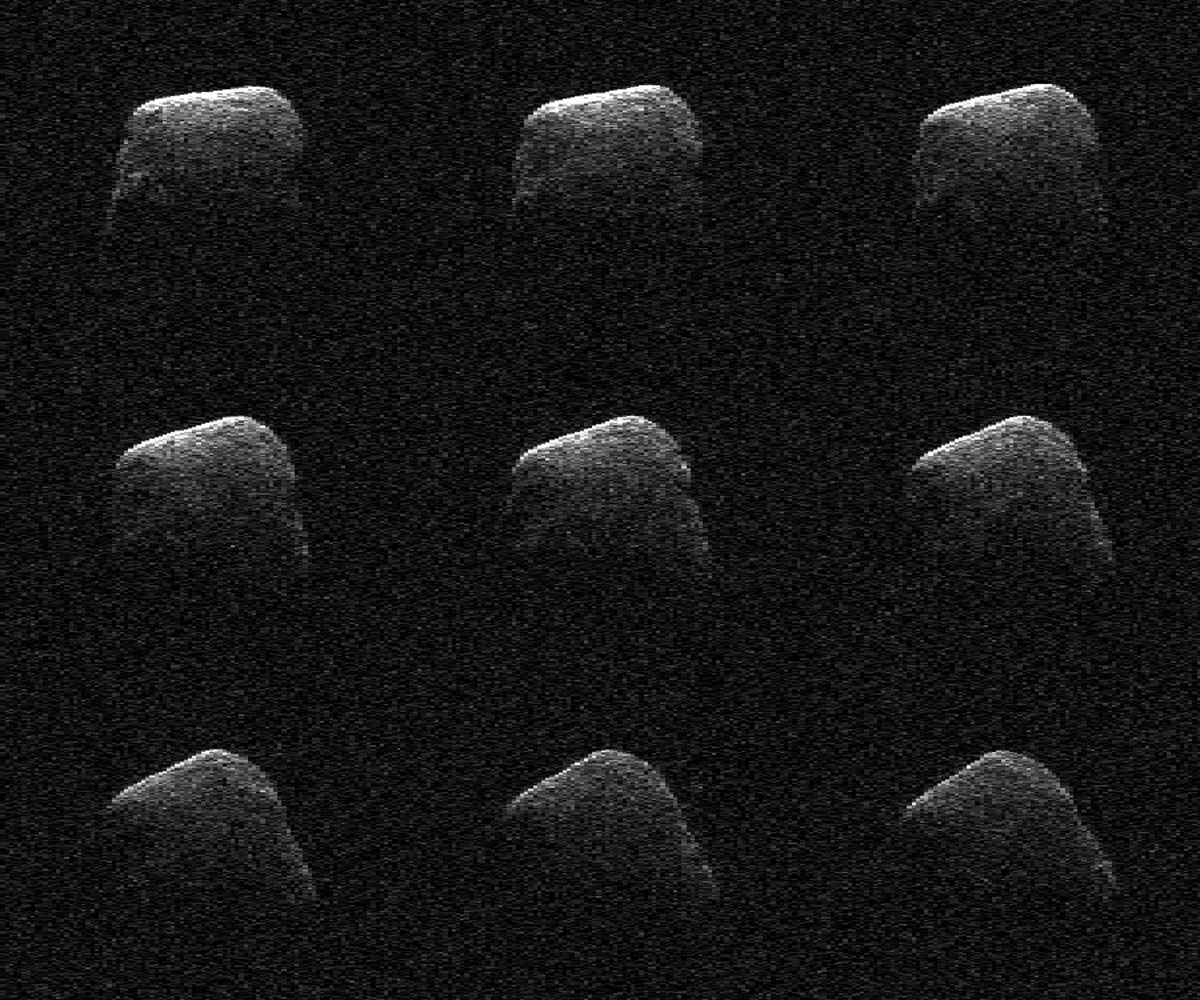
460P/PANSTARRS

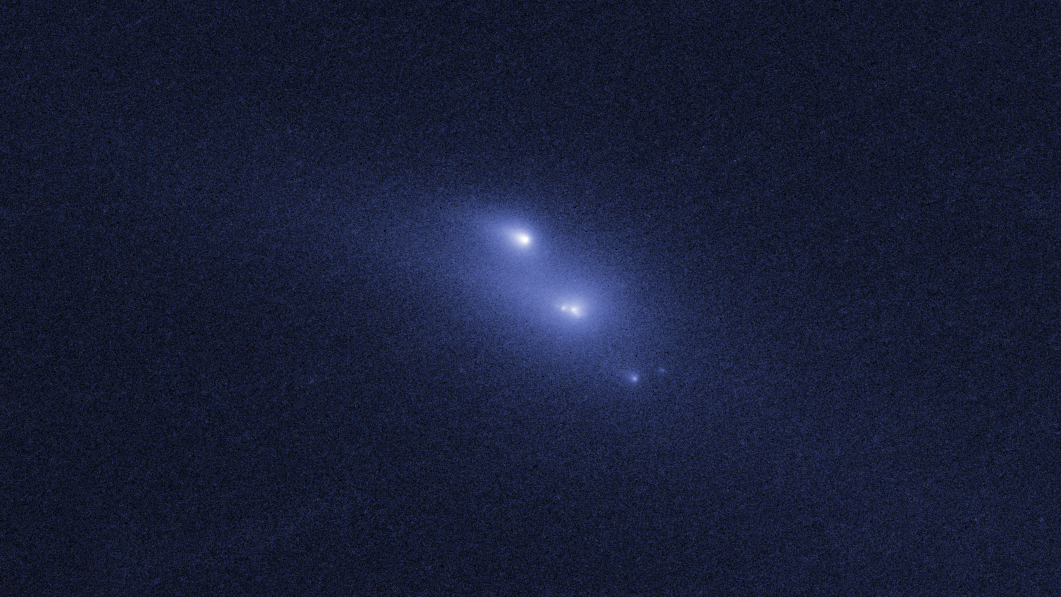
P/2013 R1 (Catalina–PANSTARRS)

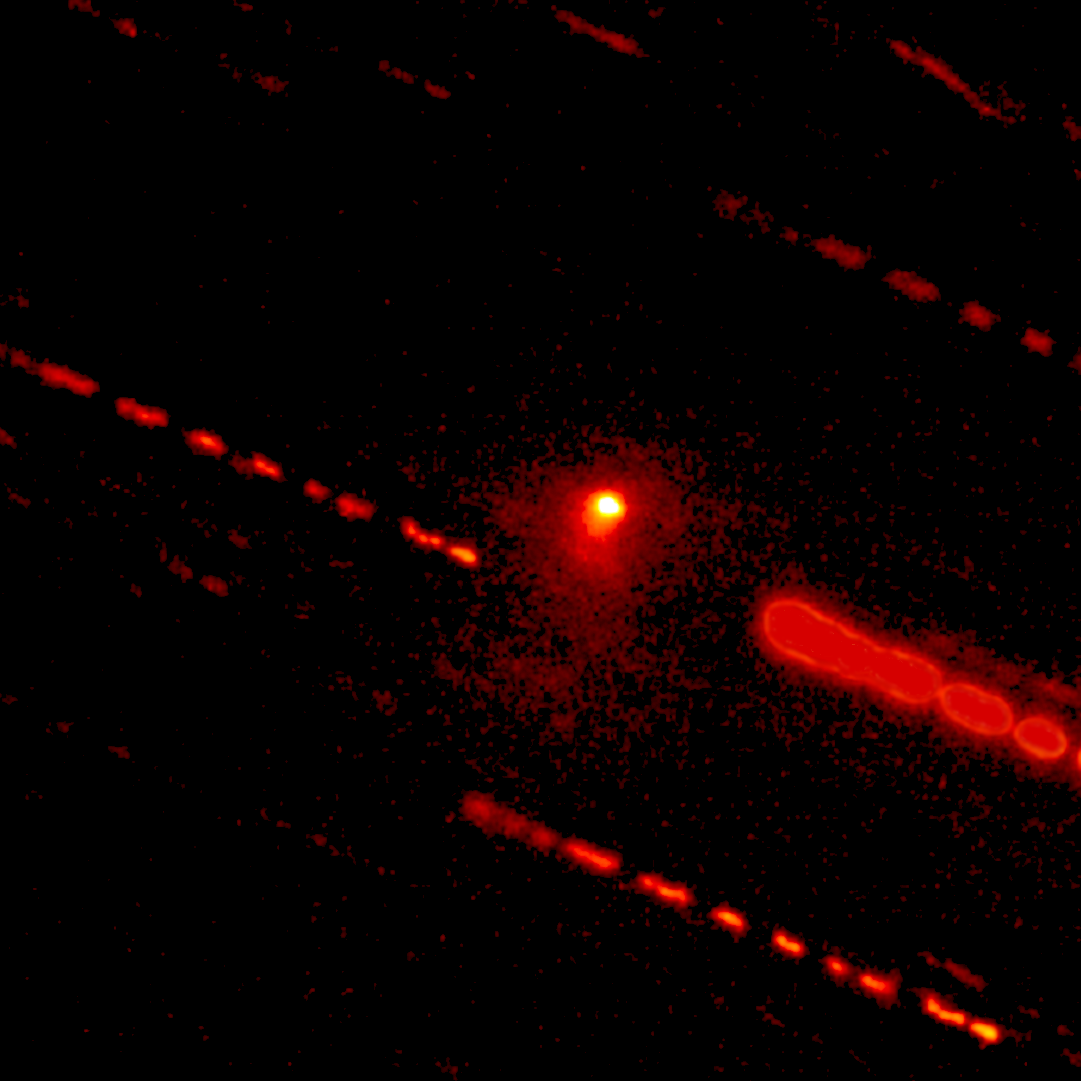
C/2014 OG392

=== Encke-type comets ===
- 311P/PanSTARRS
- 348P/PanSTARRS
- 358P/PanSTARRS
- 419P/PanSTARRS
- 426P/PanSTARRS
- 432P/PanSTARRS
- 435P/PanSTARRS
- 441P/PanSTARRS
- 455P/PanSTARRS
- 456P/PanSTARRS
- 457P/Lemmon–PanSTARRS
- 477P/PanSTARRS
- 483P/PanSTARRS
- 500P/PanSTARRS
- 511P/PanSTARRS
- 516P/PanSTARRS
- P/2013 R3 (Catalina–PanSTARRS)
- P/2015 X6 (PanSTARRS)
- P/2016 G1 (PanSTARRS)
- P/2017 FL36 (PanSTARRS)
- P/2017 S8 (PanSTARRS)
- P/2019 A3 (PanSTARRS)
- P/2019 A4 (PanSTARRS)
- P/2021 A5 (PanSTARRS)
- P/2022 R5 (PanSTARRS)
- P/2024 R2 (PanSTARRS)
- P/2024 R3 (PanSTARRS)
- P/2025 W4 (PanSTARRS)
- P/2026 C2 (PanSTARRS)

=== Jupiter-family comets ===
- 253P/PanSTARRS
- 258P/PanSTARRS
- 299P/Catalina–PanSTARRS
- 302P/Lemmon–PanSTARRS
- 347P/PanSTARRS
- 364P/PanSTARRS
- 365P/PanSTARRS
- 380P/PanSTARRS
- 386P/PanSTARRS
- 394P/PanSTARRS
- 399P/PanSTARRS
- 400P/PanSTARRS
- 445P/Lemmon–PanSTARRS
- 448P/PanSTARRS
- 454P/PanSTARRS
- 460P/PanSTARRS
- 464P/PanSTARRS
- 466P/PanSTARRS
- 469P/PanSTARRS
- 470P/PanSTARRS
- 476P/PanSTARRS
- 480P/PanSTARRS
- 481P/Lemmon–PanSTARRS
- 482P/PanSTARRS
- 503P/PanSTARRS
- 504P/WISE–PanSTARRS
- 512P/PanSTARRS
- 514P/Lemmon–PanSTARRS
- 515P/PanSTARRS
- P/2010 T2 (PanSTARRS)
- P/2011 W1 (PanSTARRS)
- P/2012 B1 (PanSTARRS)
- P/2012 C3 (PanSTARRS)
- P/2012 F2 (PanSTARRS)
- P/2012 G1 (PanSTARRS)
- P/2012 T3 (PanSTARRS)
- P/2012 U2 (PanSTARRS)
- P/2013 G4 (PanSTARRS)
- P/2013 N3 (PanSTARRS)
- P/2013 N5 (PanSTARRS)
- P/2013 P1 (PanSTARRS)
- P/2013 T1 (PanSTARRS)
- P/2013 W1 (PanSTARRS)
- P/2014 M4 (PanSTARRS)
- P/2014 O3 (PanSTARRS)
- P/2014 U4 (PanSTARRS)
- P/2014 V1 (PanSTARRS)
- P/2014 W4 (PanSTARRS)
- P/2015 B1 (PanSTARRS)
- P/2015 B4 (Lemmon–PanSTARRS)
- P/2015 D6 (Lemmon–PanSTARRS)
- P/2015 K5 (PanSTARRS)
- P/2015 P4 (PanSTARRS)
- P/2015 R2 (PanSTARRS)
- P/2015 X3 (PanSTARRS)
- P/2016 A3 (PanSTARRS)
- P/2016 A7 (PanSTARRS)
- P/2016 P1 (PanSTARRS)
- P/2017 D4 (PanSTARRS)
- P/2017 G1 (PanSTARRS)
- P/2017 P1 (PanSTARRS)
- P/2017 U3 (PanSTARRS)
- P/2018 A5 (PanSTARRS)
- P/2018 H2 (PanSTARRS)
- P/2018 L4 (PanSTARRS)
- P/2018 P4 (PanSTARRS)
- P/2019 A1 (PanSTARRS)
- P/2019 A6 (Lemmon–PanSTARRS)
- P/2019 GG21 (PanSTARRS)
- P/2019 S2 (PanSTARRS)
- P/2019 S3 (PanSTARRS)
- P/2019 T6 (PanSTARRS)
- P/2019 U4 (PanSTARRS)
- P/2019 W1 (PanSTARRS)
- P/2019 X2 (PanSTARRS)
- P/2020 A4 (PanSTARRS–Lemmon)
- P/2020 K9 (Lemmon–PanSTARRS)
- P/2020 M1 (PanSTARRS)
- P/2020 O3 (PanSTARRS)
- P/2020 R5 (PanSTARRS)
- P/2020 S1 (PanSTARRS)
- P/2020 S5 (PanSTARRS)
- P/2020 S7 (PanSTARRS)
- P/2020 T3 (PanSTARRS)
- P/2020 U2 (PanSTARRS)
- P/2020 V3 (PanSTARRS)
- P/2021 C2 (PanSTARRS)
- P/2021 HS (PanSTARRS)
- P/2021 P3 (PanSTARRS)
- P/2021 R1 (PanSTARRS)
- P/2021 R3 (PanSTARRS)
- P/2022 C1 (PanSTARRS)
- P/2022 C2 (PanSTARRS)
- P/2022 C3 (PanSTARRS)
- P/2022 D1 (PanSTARRS)
- P/2022 O2 (PanSTARRS)
- P/2022 R1 (PanSTARRS)
- P/2022 R4 (PanSTARRS)
- P/2022 S1 (PanSTARRS)
- P/2023 B1 (PanSTARRS)
- P/2023 B3 (PanSTARRS)
- P/2023 M1 (PanSTARRS)
- P/2023 M2 (PanSTARRS)
- P/2023 T1 (PanSTARRS)
- P/2023 V2 (PanSTARRS)
- P/2023 V6 (PanSTARRS)
- P/2023 X3 (PanSTARRS)
- P/2024 F1 (PanSTARRS)
- P/2024 J1 (PanSTARRS)
- P/2024 K1 (PanSTARRS)
- P/2024 N2 (PanSTARRS)
- P/2024 O2 (PanSTARRS)
- P/2024 Q1 (PanSTARRS)
- P/2024 R1 (PanSTARRS)
- P/2024 X3 (PanSTARRS)
- P/2025 A2 (PanSTARRS)
- P/2025 D3 (PanSTARRS)
- P/2025 Q2 (PanSTARRS)
- P/2025 Y2 (PanSTARRS)
- P/2026 P1 (PanSTARRS)
- P/2026 R1 (PanSTARRS)
- P/2026 R3 (PanSTARRS)

=== Halley-type comets ===
- C/2014 W9 (PanSTARRS)
- C/2015 A1 (PanSTARRS)
- P/2015 A3 (PanSTARRS)
- C/2015 GX (PanSTARRS)
- C/2015 V4 (PanSTARRS)
- C/2016 S1 (PanSTARRS)
- P/2017 G2 (PanSTARRS)
- C/2018 A1 (PanSTARRS)
- C/2018 X3 (PanSTARRS)
- C/2019 A5 (PanSTARRS)
- C/2020 S2 (PanSTARRS)
- C/2022 S5 (PanSTARRS)
- C/2024 L1 (PanSTARRS)
- C/2024 X4 (PanSTARRS)
- C/2025 A4 (PanSTARRS)
- C/2025 K2 (PanSTARRS)
- C/2026 J1 (PanSTARRS)

=== Chiron-type comets ===
- C/2011 P2 (PanSTARRS)
- C/2013 P4 (PanSTARRS)
- C/2014 OG_{392} (PanSTARRS)
- P/2015 M2 (PanSTARRS)
- C/2017 AB5 (PanSTARRS)
- P/2020 MK_{4} (PanSTARRS)
- C/2023 RS_{61} (PanSTARRS)
- C/2024 C2 (PanSTARRS)
- P/2025 D2 (PanSTARRS)

== Non-periodic comets ==
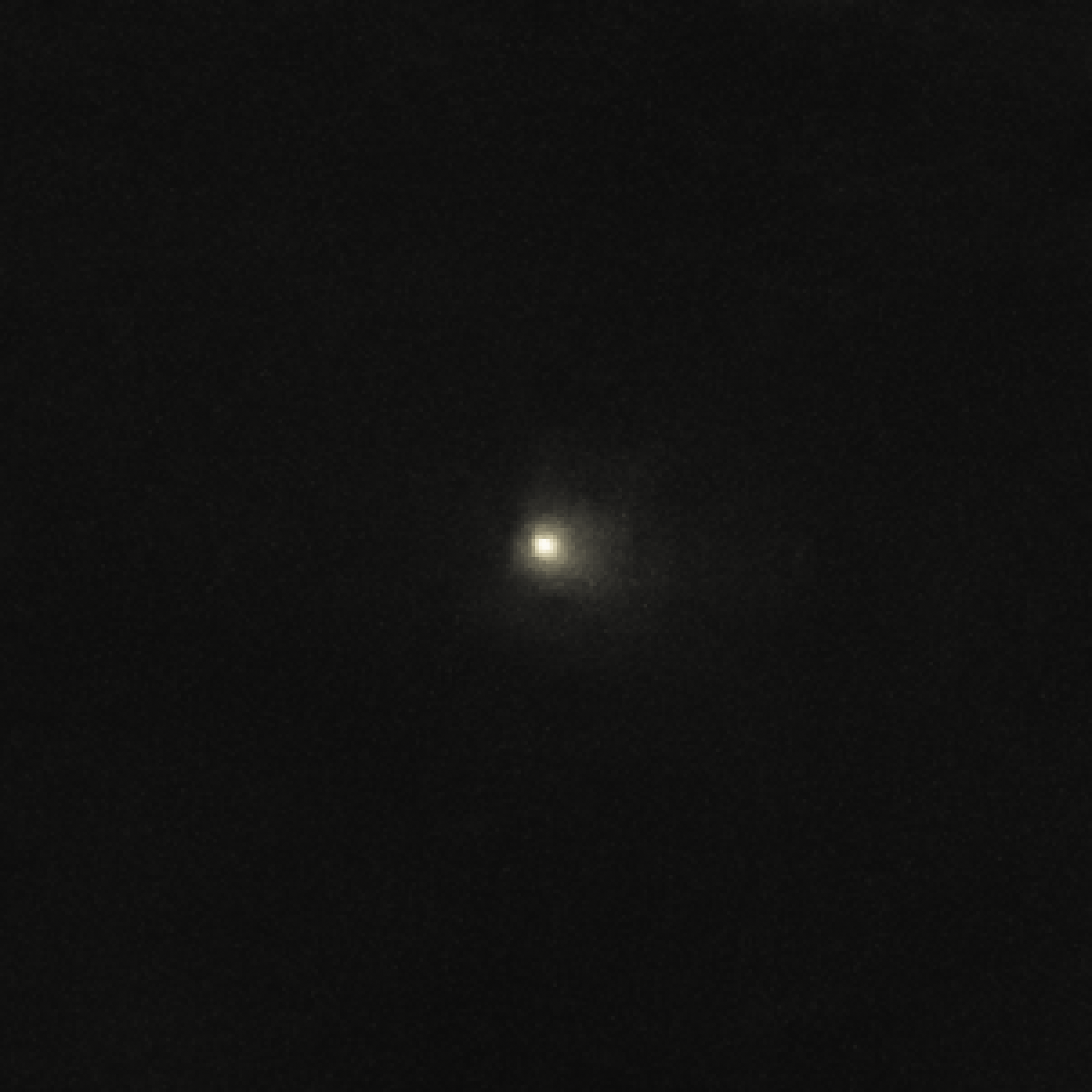
C/2014 S3

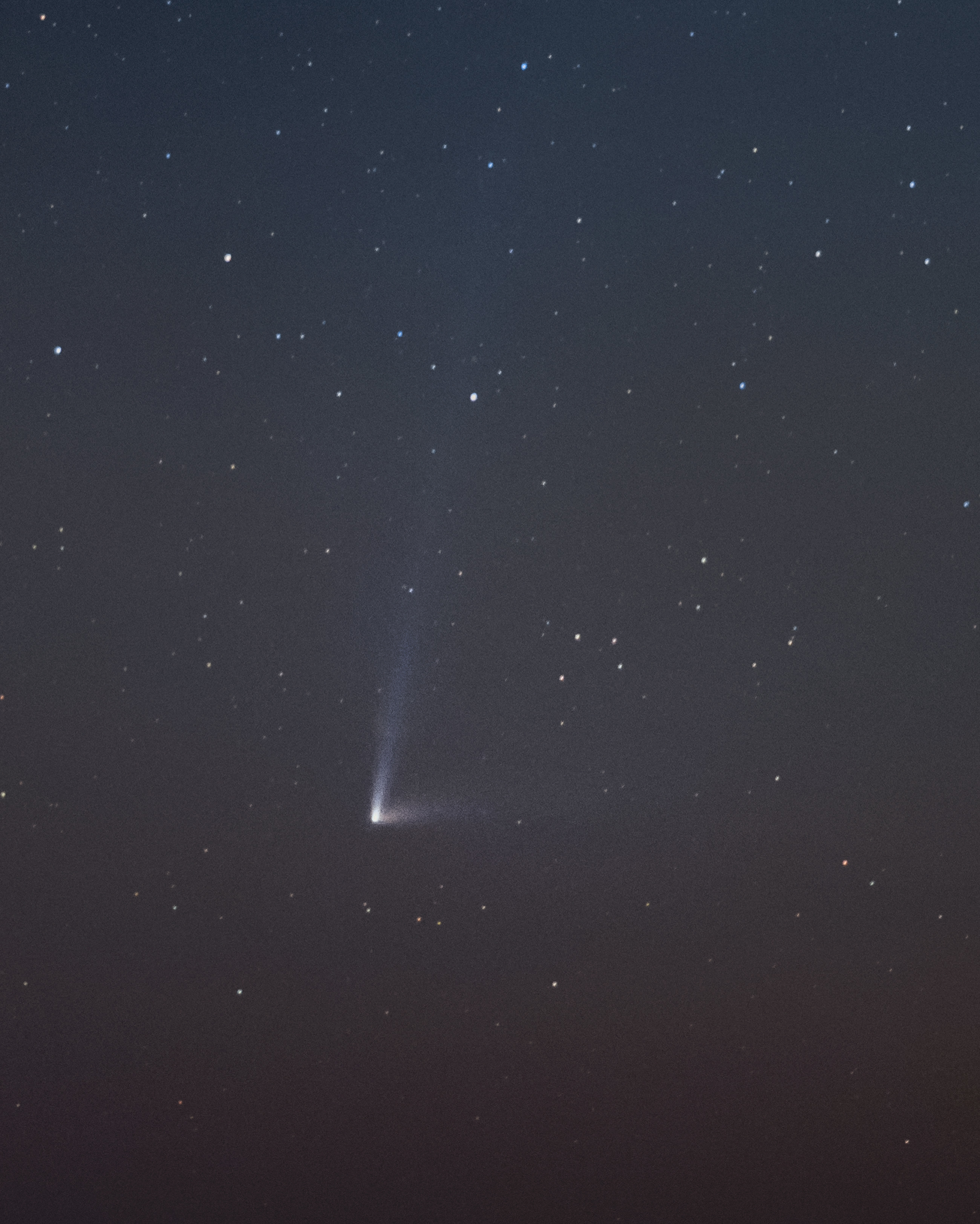
C/2014 Q1

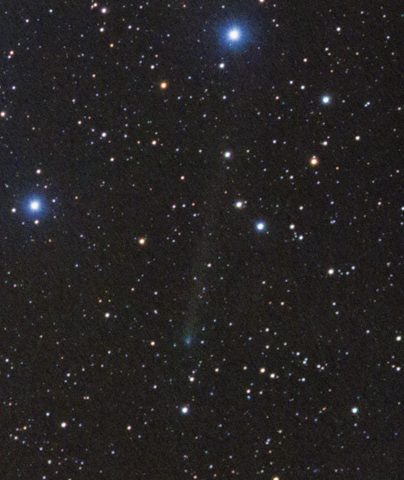
C/2015 ER61

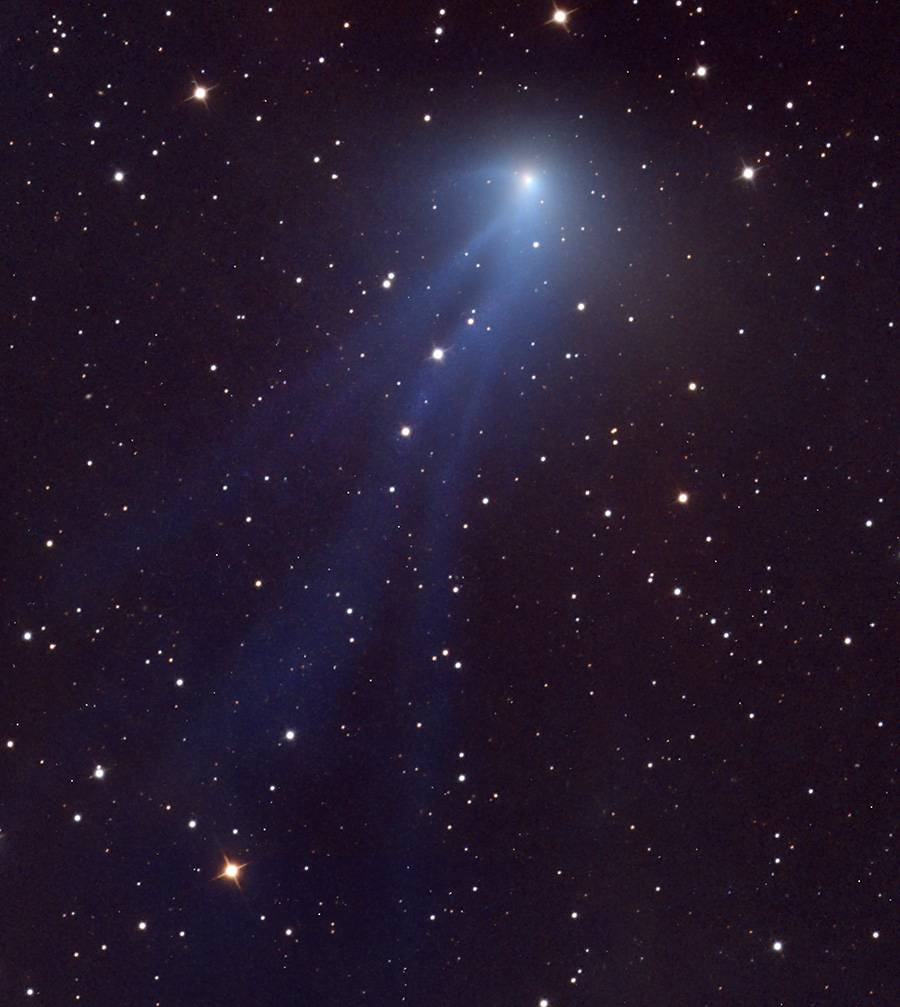
C/2016 R2

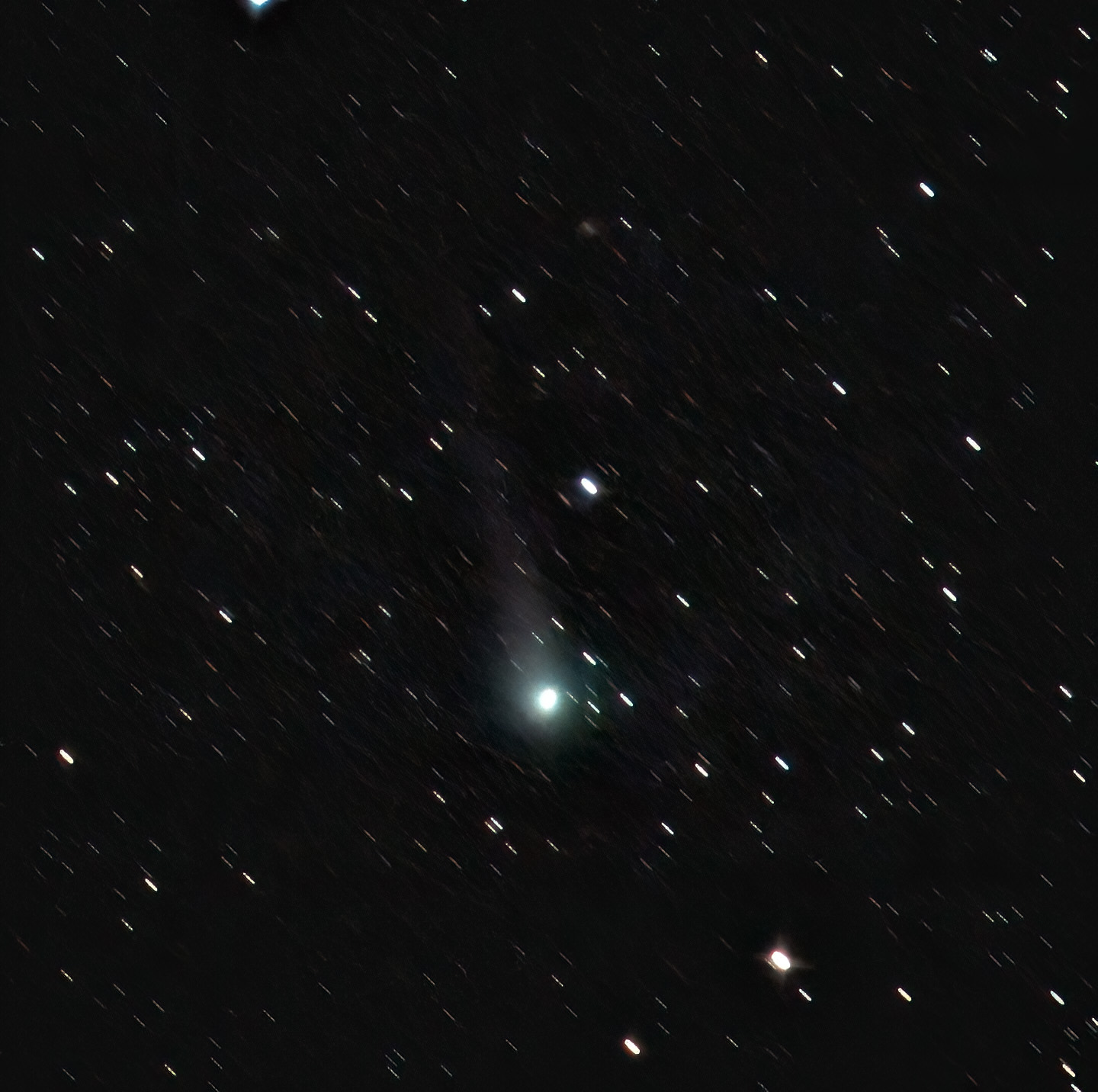
C/2017 T2

=== Long-period comets ===
- C/2014 G3 (PanSTARRS)
- C/2014 S3 (PanSTARRS)
- C/2015 T4 (PanSTARRS)
- C/2017 A1 (PanSTARRS)
- C/2017 C2 (PanSTARRS)
- C/2019 A9 (PanSTARRS)
- C/2019 O2 (PanSTARRS)
- C/2020 PV6 (PanSTARRS)
- C/2022 JK5 (PanSTARRS)
- C/2024 Q4 (PanSTARRS)
- C/2025 X1 (PanSTARRS)
- C/2026 M5 (PanSTARRS)

=== Near-parabolic comets ===
- C/2011 Q1 (PanSTARRS)
- C/2012 E3 (PanSTARRS)
- C/2012 S4 (PanSTARRS)
- C/2012 U1 (PanSTARRS)
- C/2012 V1 (PanSTARRS)
- C/2012 X2 (PanSTARRS)
- C/2013 G8 (PanSTARRS)
- C/2013 P2 (PanSTARRS)
- C/2013 W2 (PanSTARRS)
- C/2013 Y2 (PanSTARRS)
- C/2014 A5 (PanSTARRS)
- C/2014 G1 (PanSTARRS)
- C/2014 N2 (PanSTARRS)
- C/2014 OE4 (PanSTARRS)
- C/2014 Q1 (PanSTARRS)
- C/2014 Q6 (PanSTARRS)
- C/2014 QU2 (PanSTARRS)
- C/2014 R3 (PanSTARRS)
- C/2014 S2 (PanSTARRS)
- C/2014 W2 (PanSTARRS)
- C/2014 W5 (Lemmon–PanSTARRS)
- C/2014 W11 (PanSTARRS)
- C/2014 XB8 (PanSTARRS)
- C/2015 D2 (PanSTARRS)
- C/2015 ER_{61} (PanSTARRS)
- C/2015 J2 (PanSTARRS)
- C/2015 K2 (PanSTARRS)
- C/2015 M1 (PanSTARRS)
- C/2015 M3 (PanSTARRS)
- C/2015 O1 (PanSTARRS)
- C/2015 R1 (PanSTARRS)
- C/2015 R3 (PanSTARRS)
- C/2015 V3 (PanSTARRS)
- C/2015 WZ (PanSTARRS)
- C/2016 A5 (PanSTARRS)
- C/2016 A6 (PanSTARRS)
- C/2016 M1 (PanSTARRS)
- C/2016 N6 (PanSTARRS)
- C/2016 P4 (PanSTARRS)
- C/2016 Q2 (PanSTARRS)
- C/2016 R2 (PanSTARRS)
- C/2016 T3 (PanSTARRS)
- C/2016 VZ18 (PanSTARRS)
- C/2017 D5 (PanSTARRS)
- C/2017 G3 (PanSTARRS)
- C/2017 M3 (PanSTARRS)
- C/2017 P2 (PanSTARRS)
- C/2017 S2 (PanSTARRS)
- C/2017 T2 (PanSTARRS)
- C/2017 U5 (PanSTARRS)
- C/2017 X1 (PanSTARRS)
- C/2017 Y1 (PanSTARRS)
- C/2018 A4 (PanSTARRS)
- C/2018 P5 (PanSTARRS)
- C/2019 G2 (PanSTARRS)
- C/2019 K6 (PanSTARRS)
- C/2019 L1 (PanSTARRS)
- C/2019 Y5 (PanSTARRS)
- C/2020 F6 (PanSTARRS)
- C/2020 H8 (PanSTARRS)
- C/2020 H11 (PanSTARRS–Lemmon)
- C/2020 K1 (PanSTARRS)
- C/2020 K4 (PanSTARRS)
- C/2020 K7 (PanSTARRS)
- C/2020 Q2 (PanSTARRS)
- C/2020 R2 (PanSTARRS)
- C/2020 U5 (PanSTARRS)
- C/2021 A6 (PanSTARRS)
- C/2021 B2 (PanSTARRS)
- C/2021 C5 (PanSTARRS)
- C/2021 F1 (Lemmon–PanSTARRS)
- C/2021 J2 (PANSTARRS)
- C/2021 N3 (PANSTARRS)
- C/2021 P2 (PANSTARRS)
- C/2021 Q6 (PanSTARRS)
- C/2021 QM45 (PanSTARRS)
- C/2021 R2 (PanSTARRS)
- C/2021 R7 (PanSTARRS)
- C/2022 H1 (PanSTARRS)
- C/2022 L4 (PanSTARRS)
- C/2023 F1 (PanSTARRS)
- C/2023 H1 (PanSTARRS)
- C/2023 H3 (PanSTARRS)
- C/2023 Q2 (PanSTARRS)
- C/2023 V3 (PanSTARRS)
- C/2024 C1 (PanSTARRS)
- C/2024 C3 (PanSTARRS)
- C/2024 F2 (PanSTARRS)
- C/2024 G4 (PanSTARRS)
- C/2024 L2 (PanSTARRS)
- C/2024 T3 (PanSTARRS)
- C/2024 U1 (PanSTARRS)
- C/2024 W1 (PanSTARRS)
- C/2025 D5 (PanSTARRS)
- C/2025 E1 (PanSTARRS)
- C/2025 M1 (PanSTARRS)
- C/2025 R3 (PanSTARRS)
- C/2026 B3 (PanSTARRS)
- C/2026 L1 (PanSTARRS)
- C/2026 L2 (PanSTARRS)
- C/2026 N1 (PanSTARRS)
- C/2026 P2 (PanSTARRS)

== Hyperbolic comets ==
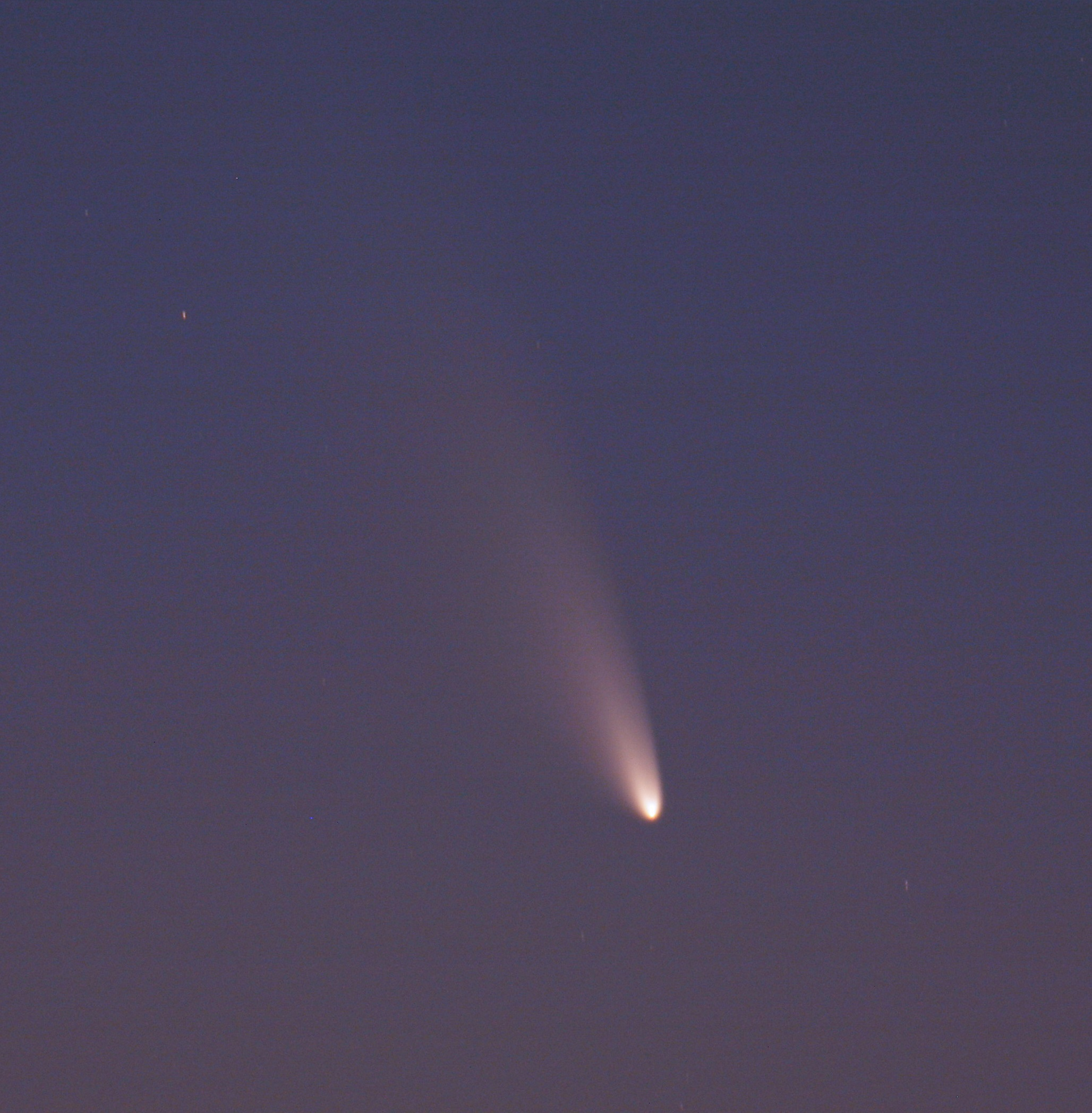
C/2011 L4

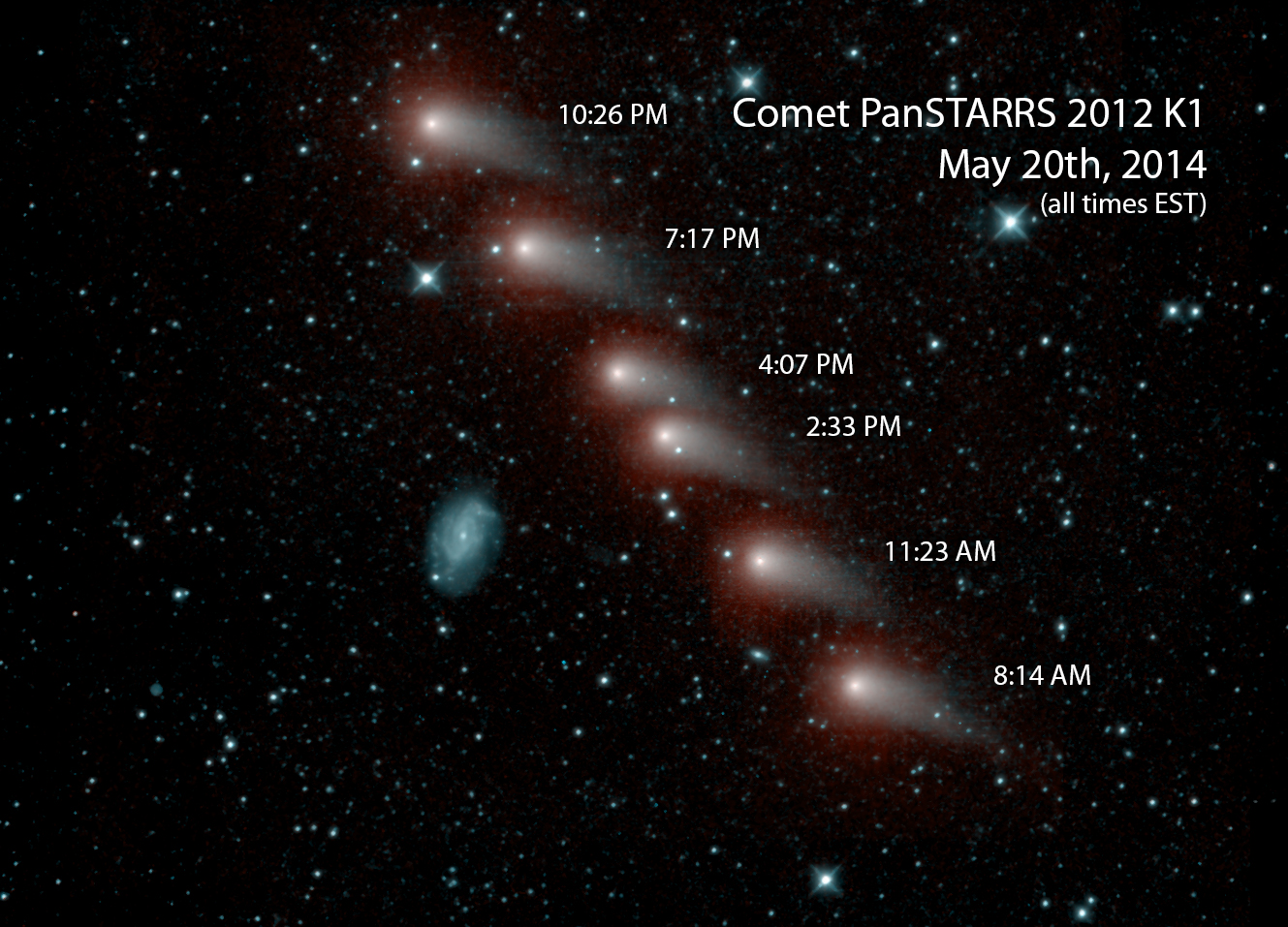
C/2012 K1

C/2017 K2

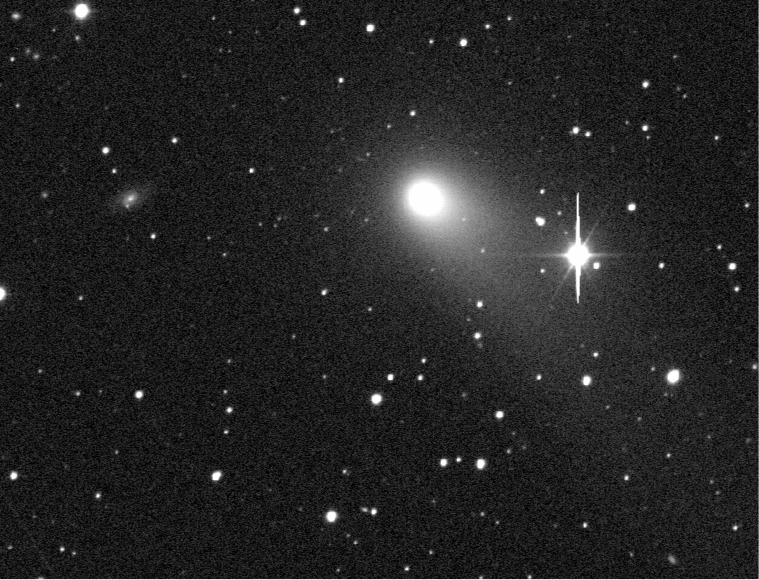
C/2022 A2

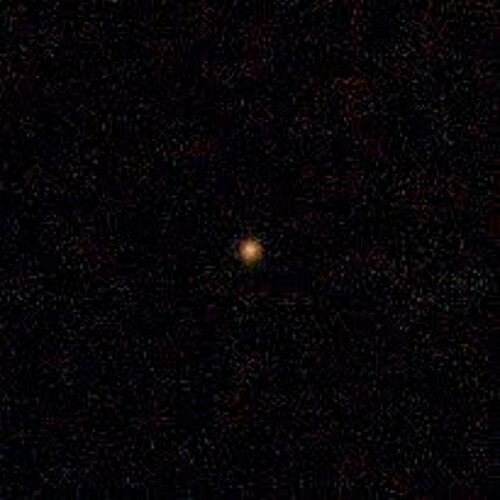
1I/'Oumuamua

- C/2011 L4 (PanSTARRS)
- C/2011 U3 (PanSTARRS)
- C/2012 A1 (PanSTARRS)
- C/2012 F3 (PanSTARRS)
- C/2012 K1 (PanSTARRS)
- C/2012 S3 (PanSTARRS)
- C/2013 G3 (PanSTARRS)
- C/2013 X1 (PanSTARRS)
- C/2014 M1 (PanSTARRS)
- C/2014 S1 (PanSTARRS)
- C/2014 W3 (PanSTARRS)
- C/2014 W8 (PanSTARRS)
- C/2014 W10 (PanSTARRS)
- C/2014 Y1 (PanSTARRS)
- C/2015 A2 (PanSTARRS)
- C/2015 B2 (PanSTARRS)
- C/2015 D3 (PanSTARRS)
- C/2015 E61 (PanSTARRS)
- C/2015 H2 (PanSTARRS)
- C/2015 J1 (PanSTARRS)
- C/2015 K4 (PanSTARRS)
- C/2015 LC2 (PanSTARRS)
- C/2015 T2 (PanSTARRS)
- C/2015 V1 (PanSTARRS)
- C/2015 VL62 (Lemmon–Yeung–PanSTARRS)
- C/2015 X5 (PanSTARRS)
- C/2016 A1 (PanSTARRS)
- C/2016 C1 (PanSTARRS)
- C/2016 E1 (PanSTARRS)
- C/2017 E3 (PanSTARRS)
- C/2017 F2 (PanSTARRS)
- C/2017 K1 (PanSTARRS)
- C/2017 K2 (PanSTARRS)
- C/2017 K5 (PanSTARRS)
- C/2017 S3 (PanSTARRS)
- C/2017 U4 (PanSTARRS)
- C/2017 U7 (PanSTARRS)
- C/2017 Y2 (PanSTARRS)
- C/2018 F4 (PanSTARRS)
- C/2019 B3 (PanSTARRS)
- C/2019 G4 (PanSTARRS)
- C/2019 Q3 (PanSTARRS)
- C/2019 U5 (PanSTARRS)
- C/2020 K2 (PanSTARRS)
- C/2020 K5 (PanSTARRS)
- C/2020 N1 (PanSTARRS)
- C/2020 S4 (PanSTARRS)
- C/2020 T4 (PanSTARRS)
- C/2020 U4 (PanSTARRS)
- C/2021 A9 (PanSTARRS)
- C/2021 G3 (PanSTARRS)
- C/2021 O3 (PanSTARRS)
- C/2021 P1 (PanSTARRS)
- C/2021 S3 (PanSTARRS)
- C/2022 A2 (PanSTARRS)
- C/2022 N2 (PanSTARRS)
- C/2022 R6 (PanSTARRS)
- C/2022 S3 (PanSTARRS)
- C/2023 Q1 (PanSTARRS)
- C/2023 R1 (PanSTARRS)
- C/2023 R2 (PanSTARRS)
- C/2023 X7 (PanSTARRS)
- C/2024 L3 (PanSTARRS)
- C/2024 N1 (PanSTARRS)
- C/2024 O1 (PanSTARRS)
- C/2024 Q3 (PanSTARRS)
- C/2024 R4 (PanSTARRS)
- C/2025 B1 (PanSTARRS)
- C/2025 K3 (PanSTARRS)
- C/2025 M2 (PanSTARRS)
- C/2025 M3 (PanSTARRS)
- C/2025 Y3 (PanSTARRS)
- C/2026 A3 (PanSTARRS)
- C/2026 H1 (PanSTARRS)
- C/2026 O1 (PanSTARRS)

=== Interstellar objects ===
- 1I/'Oumuamua, the very first interstellar object ever discovered
