= C/2025 R3 (PanSTARRS) =

Oort cloud comet

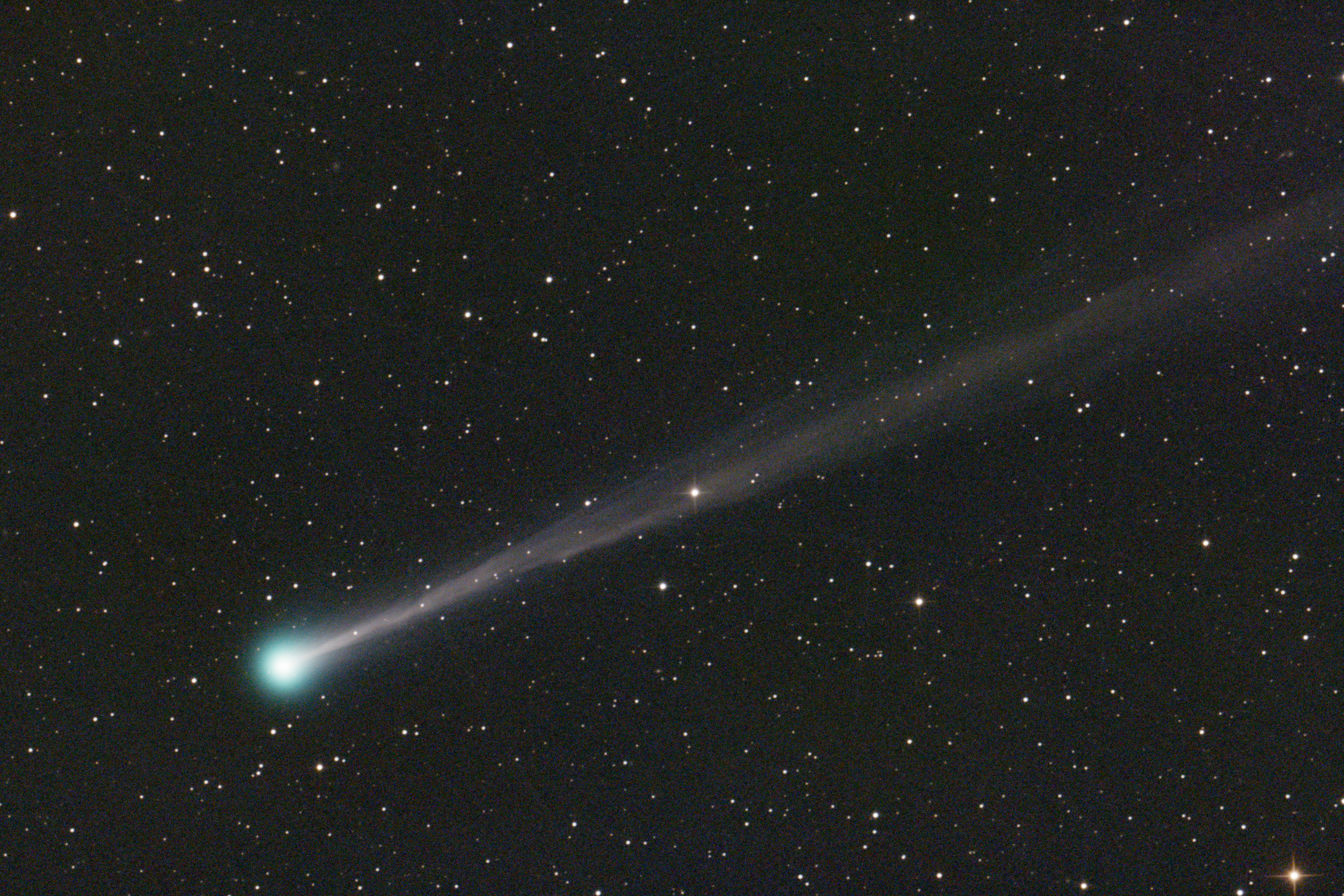
- Comet C/2025 R3 (PanSTARRS) imaged on 8 April 2026

Discovery
- Discovered by: Pan-STARRS
- Discovery date: 8 September 2025

Designations
- Alternative designations: CK25R030

Orbital characteristics
- Epoch: 27 December 2025 (JD 2461036.5)
- Observation arc: 216 days
- Earliest precovery date: 7 September 2025
- Number of observations: 707
- Aphelion: ≈6300 AU (inbound) ejection (outbound)
- Perihelion: 0.499 AU (75 million km)
- Semi-major axis: ≈3100 AU (inbound)
- Eccentricity: 0.99984 (inbound); 1.00025 (outbound)
- Orbital period: ≈170000 years (inbound) ejection (outbound)
- Inclination: 124.73°
- Longitude of ascending node: 38.69°
- Argument of periapsis: 162.23°
- Mean anomaly: -0.0022°
- Last perihelion: 19 April 2026
- T_{Jupiter}: -0.498
- Earth MOID: 0.487 AU
- Jupiter MOID: 1.45 AU

Physical characteristics
- Comet total magnitude (M1): 12.0±0.7
- Apparent magnitude: 1.5 (2026-04-26) (Note: Since the surface brightness of a diffuse coma+nucleus is harder to detect than a point-like star of the same magnitude, a comet realistically needs to reach an apparent magnitude of ≈4.5 to be visible to the naked eye under a rural dark sky. Magnitude 6 is a good target for 40mm binoculars and magnitude 8 is a good target for 70mm binoculars.)

C/2025 R3 (PanSTARRS) is a hyperbolic Oort cloud comet that passed perihelion on 19 April 2026 when it was 0.499 AU (75 million km) from the Sun. Around perihelion it reached about an apparent magnitude of +3. By May 5–6 it was barely visible to the naked eye as it was located very low and close to the twilight sky. The comet was discovered by PanSTARRS in images obtained on 8 September 2025. By 20 March 2026 it became visible in 10x50 binoculars. As of May, the comet had faded, moved into the southern skies and required binoculars or a camera to locate. By the end of July it had faded to magnitude 17 as it headed out of the Solar System, never to be seen again.

== Observational history ==
=== Discovery ===
The comet was spotted in images obtained by the 1.8-m Ritchey-Chretien telescope at Haleakala, Hawaii, as part of the PanSTARRS survey, at an apparent magnitude of about 20. The head of the comet appeared diffuse, about 2.5 arcseconds across, and there was no tail visible. A broad tail 10 arcseconds long was visible in follow-up images by the Canada-France-Hawaii Telescope. On 11 September the comet was 3.60 AU (539 million km) from the Sun.

=== Follow-up observations ===
In January the comet was around magnitude 17, but afterwards the comet started to brighten quickly. In mid March it had brighened to about magnitude 9. On 20 March 2026 the comet was detected visually in 10x50 binoculars by Alan Hale. On 21 March the tail of the comet was about one degree long. On April 4 the comet had an apparent magnitude of about 6 and its coma 3 arcminutes across under moonlight and the comet near the horizon.

On 7 April 2026 was 33 degrees from the Sun, its maximum elongation between the two solar conjunctions. On 8 April, its ion tail was at least 7 degrees long, but little dust tail was visible. At that time the comet was moving slowly at the western half of the Pegasus Square, but its motion was accelerating as the elongation started to reduce. On 11 April the comet was spotted with naked eye, with an estimated magnitude of 5.1.

It reached perihelion, at 0.499 AU (74.6 million km; 46.4 million mi), on 19 April 2026 when it was 20 degrees from the Sun. It then moved between the Sun and Earth and the brightness of the dust tail was significantly enhanced by forward scattering. It reached solar conjunction on 25 April 2026 around 05:23 UT when it was 3.5 degrees from the Sun. The comet passed 0.489 AU (73.2 million km) from Earth on 26 April 2026.

It entered SOHO's LASCO C3 FOV on 23 April and CCOR-1 on 24 April.

== Orbit ==
Data from JPL-HORIZONS show that its future (outbound) trajectory indicates that the comet will be ejected from the Solar System. Backward integration of its orbit in the last 3 million years show that there is a 91% probability that it may have an extrasolar origin, although an origin within our Solar System, particularly the Oort cloud, are not completely ruled out. If confirmed, this makes it the second known extrasolar comet candidate within the Solar System after C/2018 V1 (Machholz–Fujikawa–Iwamoto).

The comet passed within 1.58 AU (236 million km) from Uranus on 23 November 2019.

== Physical characteristics ==
Radio observations conducted by the Five-hundred-meter Aperture Spherical Telescope (FAST) on 7–8 April 2026 detected 18-cm emission lines of hydroxyl (OH) from its coma, prompting follow-up observations to be conducted. Spectroscopic analysis from the Asiago Astrophysical Observatory further detected the presence H-alpha and H_{2}O+ emission lines from the comet on 15 April 2026.

== Gallery ==
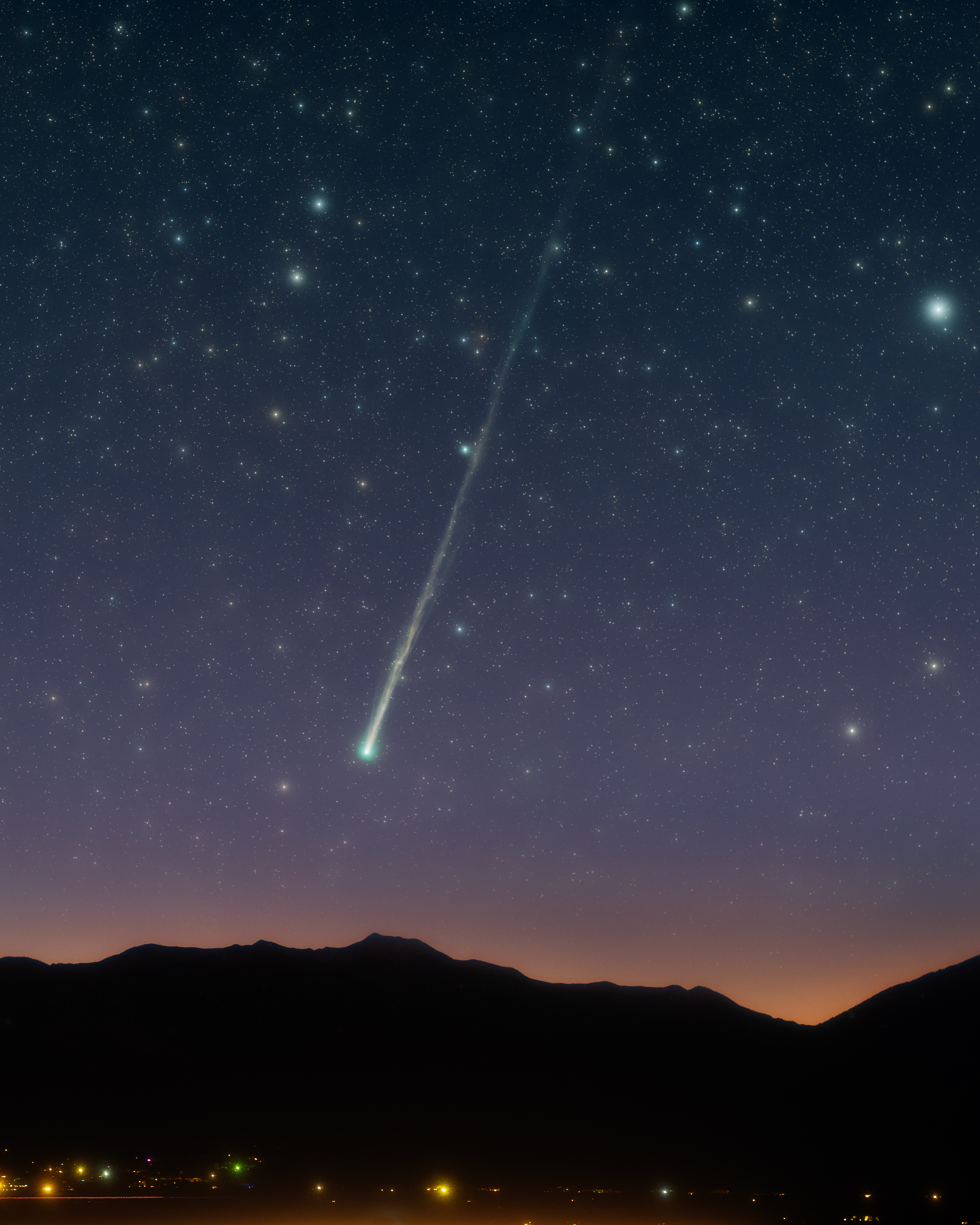
On 16 April, seen from near Taos, New Mexico.

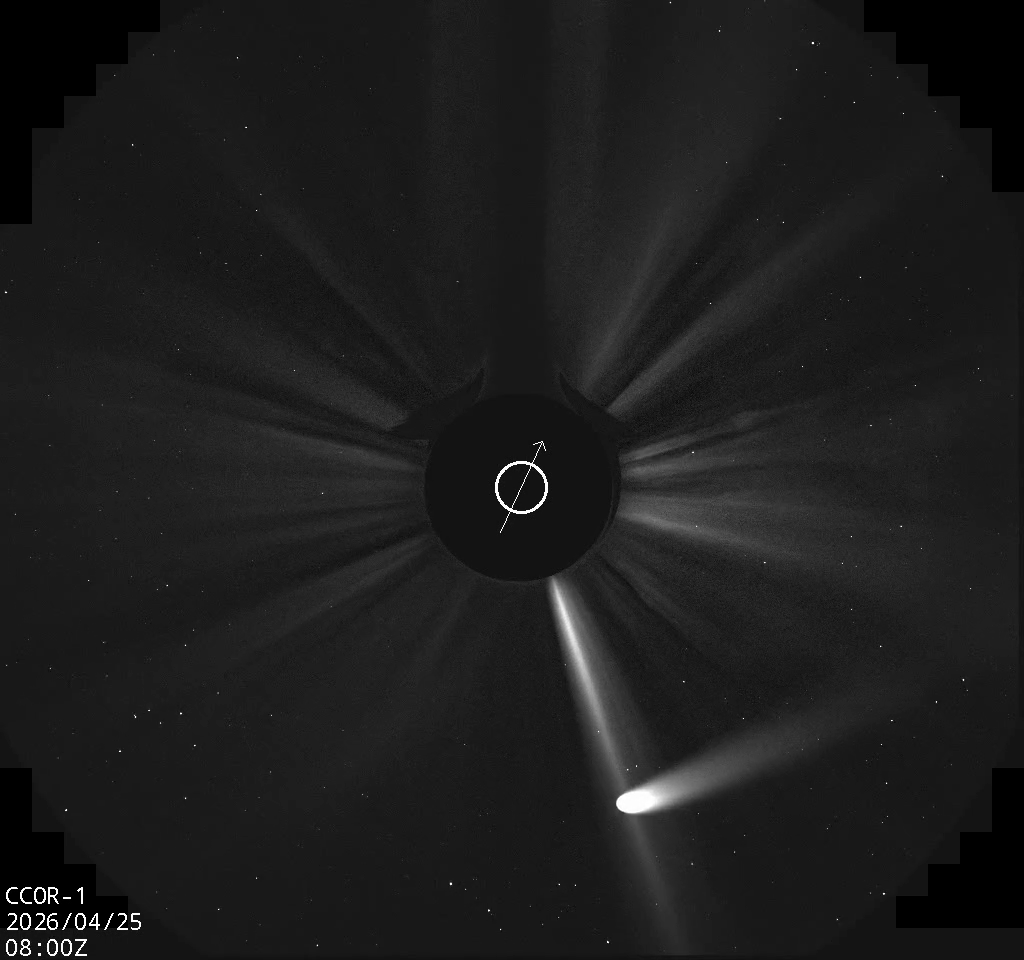
On 25 April, as it crossed the view of the CCOR-1 coronagraph.

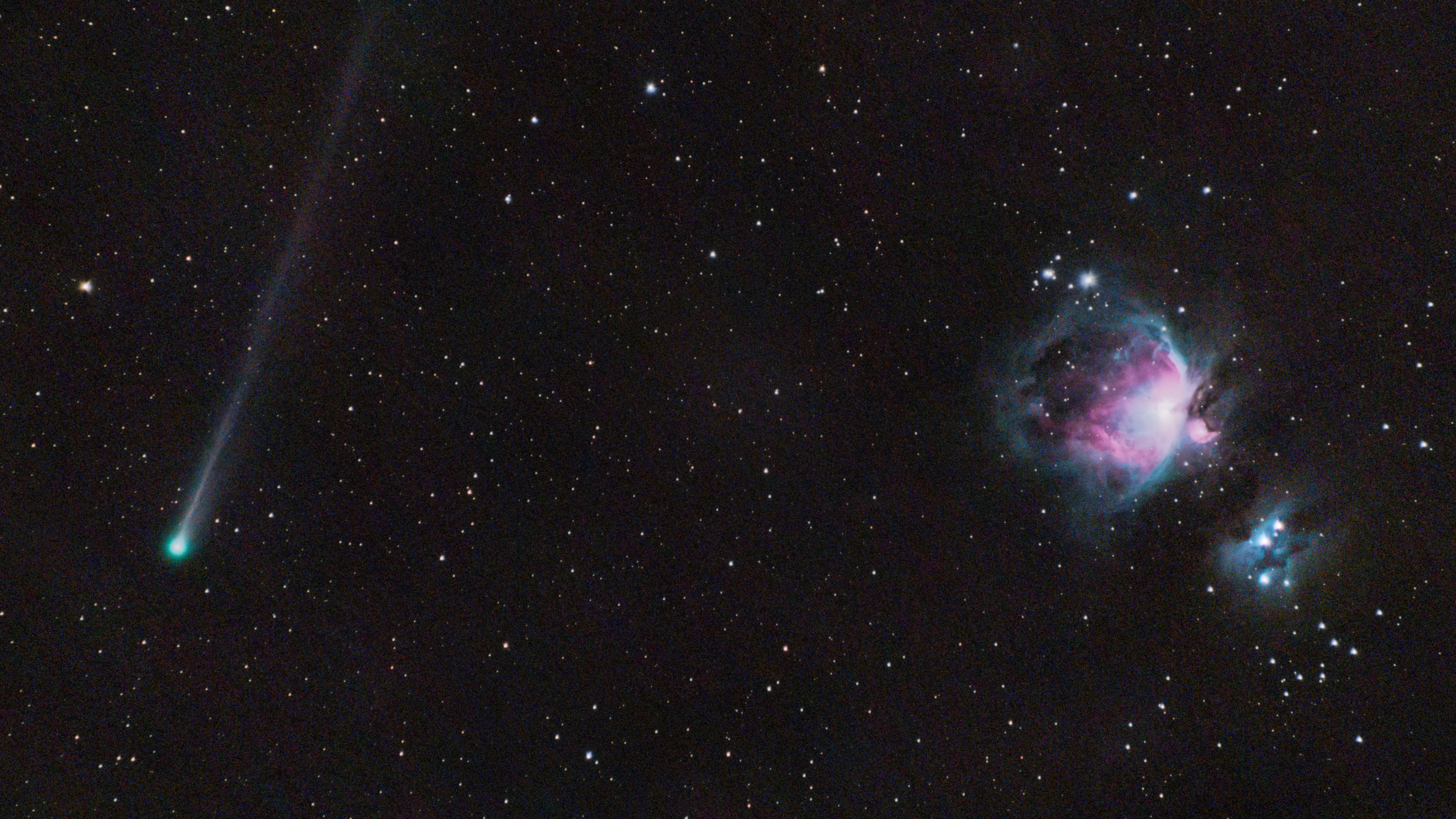
On 9 May near the Orion Nebula, seen from Porirua, New Zealand.

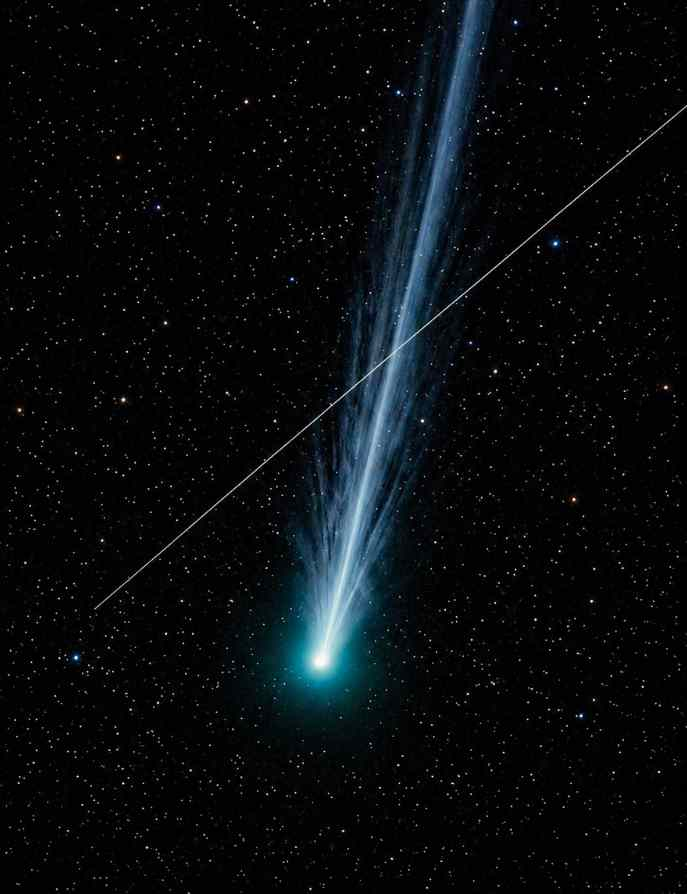
On 12 April, photographed from Citrus Springs, Florida, USA. A Starlink trail is visible crossing the comet's ion tail.

== See also ==
- C/2025 R2 (SWAN)
- C/2026 A1 (MAPS), a Kreutz sungrazer that was expected to become visible to the naked eye a few weeks before C/2025 R3, before disintegrating on 4 April 2026.
