= CCOR-1 =

Coronograph on the NOAA GOES-19 satellite

Halo CME seen on 18 January 2026. Moon can be seen passing.

CCOR-1 (for Compact CORonagraph-1) is a space-based coronagraph aboard a geostationary satellite GOES-19 owned by NOAA. The primary objective of CCOR-1 mission is to provide images of solar corona in realtime.

It is the first (of planned three) coronagraph of CCOR series. CCOR-2, the second instrument of the suite, began operations in June 2026.

Covering Sun's extremely bright surface (photosphere) allows observations of its atmosphere, corona. It is millions of times fainter than the Sun itself, its surface brightness roughly being comparable to full Moon's. Coronal mass ejections can pose a signifcant threat to power grids or transformers and coronagraph's main purpose is to observe those events in order to prepare early for the arrival of CME.

== Mission ==
The instrument obtains white-light images of the solar corona and sends the data to the ground with a latency of 30 minutes or less. The data is then used to make a space weather forecast. CCOR suite also replaces aging research coronagraphs like SOHO/LASCO or STEREO/COR.

It was launched on 25 June 2024 at 5:26 PM EDT by Falcon Heavy rocket from John F. Kennedy Space Center. On 19 September 2024, it obtained its first light image. The satellite along with all of its instruments was handed over to NOAA on 29 January 2025.

On 7 April 2025, GOES-19 was declared an official operational satellite of GOES-East.

== Technicals ==
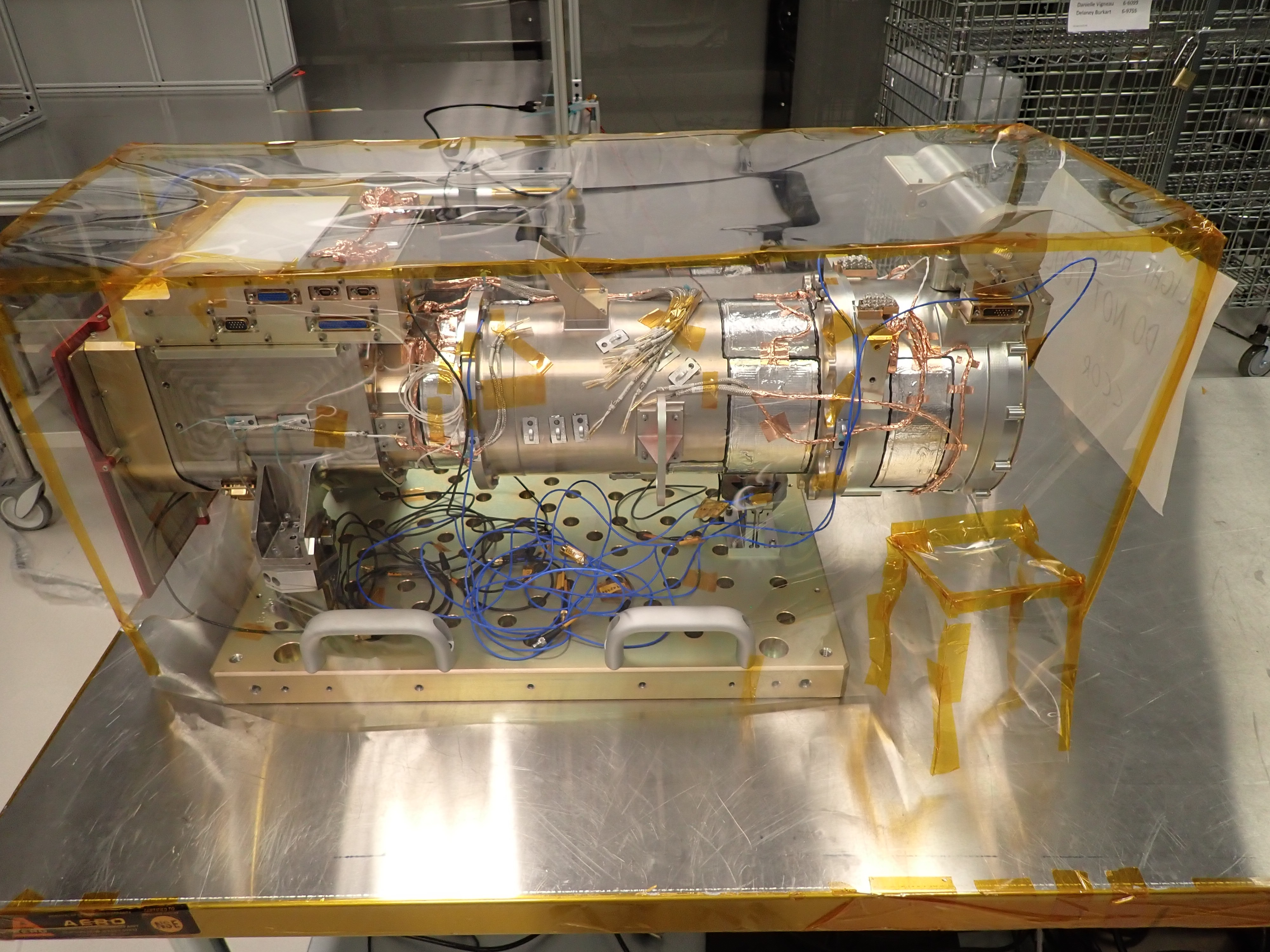
Prepared for shock testing

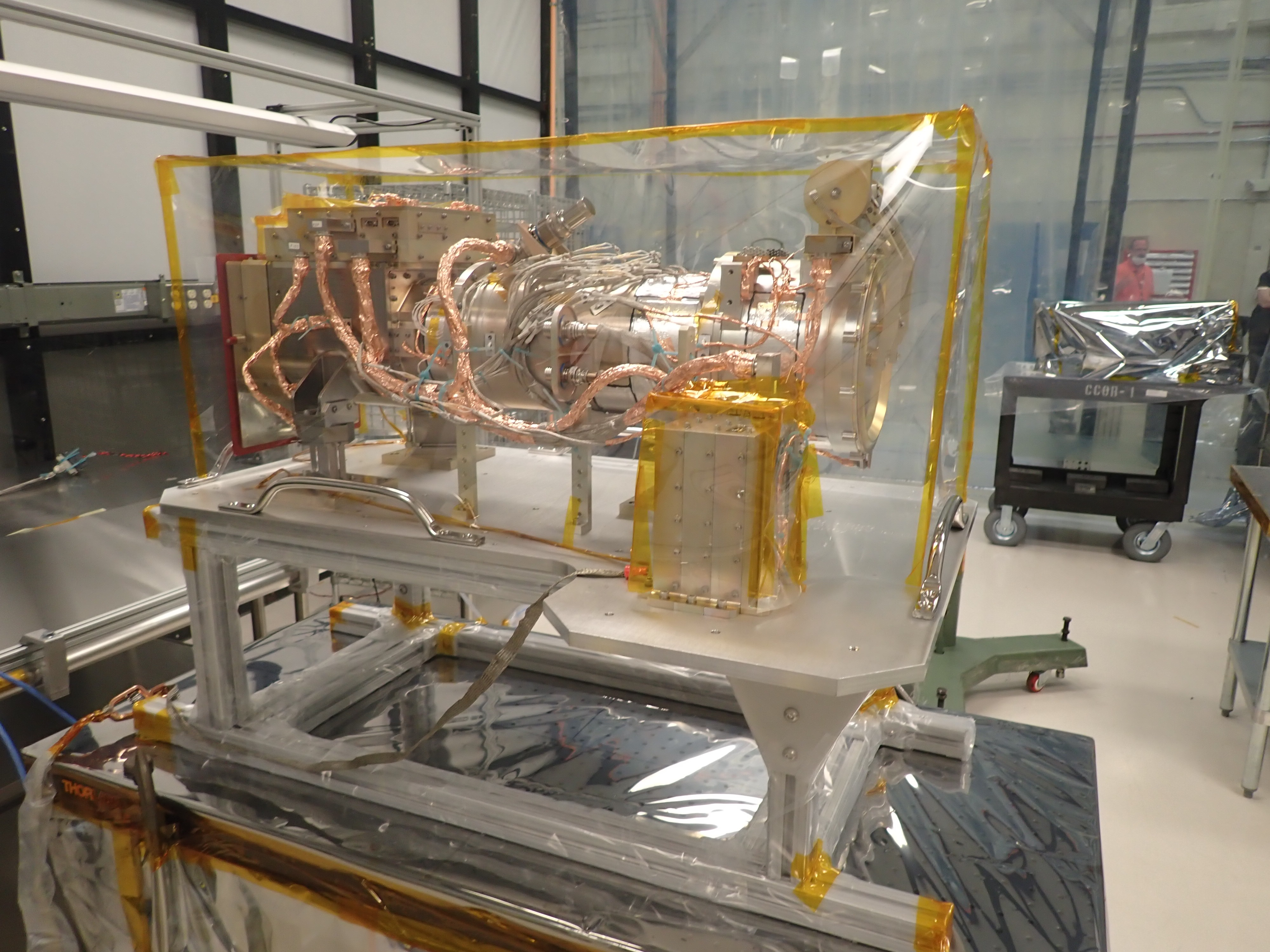
After magnetic characterization

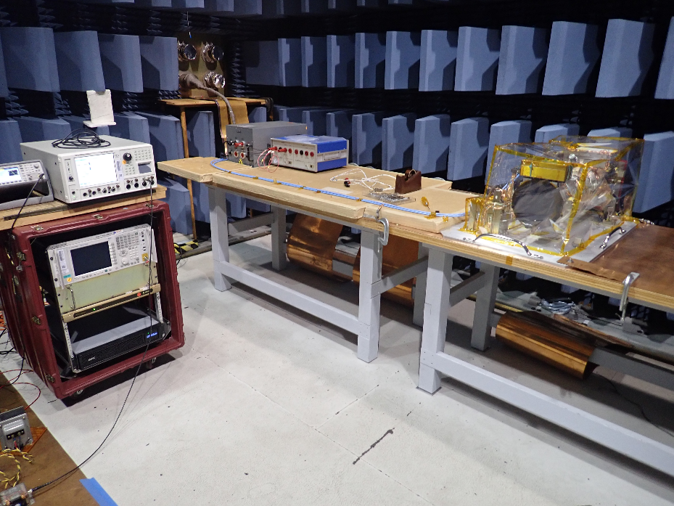
Electromagnetic testing

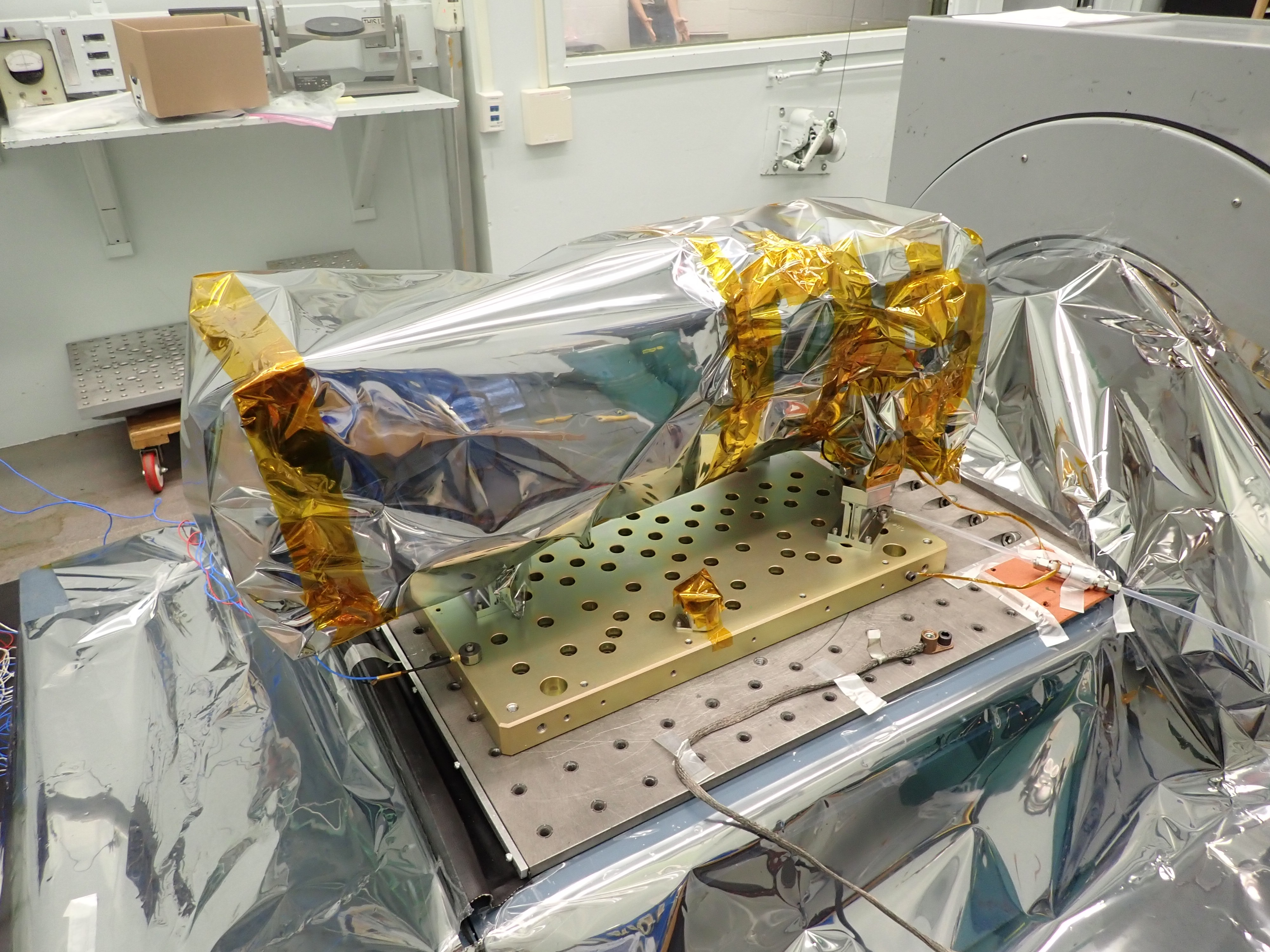
Other image from shock testing

CCOR-1 was developed and tested by US Naval Research Laboratory (NRL). It is mounted on a Sun Pointing Platform (SPS) which is specifically designed for solar instruments. CCOR-1 sits alongside EXIS and SUVI.

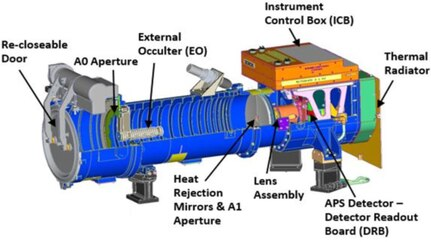
CCOR-1 from outside. Source: Naval Research Laboratory

Earth passes CCOR-1 field of view once a day as a result of GOES's geostationary orbit. Around 20 days before and after any equinox, the Earth eclipses half the number of all images taken. CCOR-1 performs a 180-degree roll (yaw-flip) every equinox to fight stray light reflected from the solar array.

=== Requirements ===
The list of requirements that the instrument has to follow is written below:

Note:

$B_{\odot}$ stands for mean surface brightness of the Sun $\approx$ –10.69 mag/arcsec$^{2}$

$R_{\odot}$ is Sun's radius = 695,700 kilometres (432,288 miles) = 0.266°. The FOV width is measured at 1 AU (149.6 million km; 93.0 million mi), measured from the outermost edge of the star.

- FOV of 3.7 – 17$\leq$ $R_{\odot}$
- A signal to noise ratio of 10 for 5.1 $R_{\odot}$ – 21.0 $R_{\odot}$(1.36° – 5.6°) and spatial resolution of $\leq$ 50 arcseconds
- Visible light bandpass
- Accuracy of measurements of solar corona brightness down to 10% error or better
- Minimum solar corona intensity of $1.0 \times 10^{-11}$$B_{\odot}$
- Maximum solar corona intensity of $1.0 \times 10^{-8}$$B_{\odot}$
- Cadence of 15 minutes for full resolution images and 5 minutes for 2×2 binned
- Latency of $\leq$30 minutes
- Capability for meeting all mission requirements during solar storm of intensity S4 and flare intensity of X50
- Inner geometric cutoff of 3.7 $R_{\odot}$
- CME velocity estimate with $\leq$5% error for 200–3,400 km/s (120–2,110 mi/s; 450,000–7,610,000 mph)
- CME mass estimate with $\leq$ 50% error for $1.0 \times 10^{7}$ kg to $5.0 \times 10^{14}$ kg range
- Coronal brightness measurement of $\leq$10% error
- Reclosable door for possible 5 year on orbit storage
- Mission of 5 years length with 5 years of resources

=== Specifications ===
The actual specifications are:

Parameter	Value
Mass	25 kg (55.1 lb) entire instrument
Power System Box mass	2.3 kilograms (5.1 pounds)
Pixel size	10 µm × 10 µm
Power	22.5 W
Focal length	109.53 mm
Plate scale	19.33"/px in inner FOV | 19.10"/px in outer FOV
Detector pixels	2048 × 1920 px
FOV in degrees (width, height)	10.8°, 10.2°
Inner FOV geometric cutoff	3.7 $R_{\odot}$(0.984°)
Inner FOV photometric cutoff (S/N ratio $\geq$ 1)	4.0 $R_{\odot}$
Outer side FOV (radially from the Sun surface)	18.8 $R_{\odot}$
Outer diagonal FOV	22.5 $R_{\odot}$
Spatial resolution	≤50 arcseconds at ≥10% MTF
Field with this resolution	5 $R_{\odot}$ – 20 $R_{\odot}$
Bandpass FWHM	470 – 740 nm
Bandpass	450 – 750 nm / 480 – 730 nm (different sources)
Vignetting FOV	to 17.4 $R_{\odot}$
F-number	6.84
Number of occulting disks	19
Cadence in full resolution	15 minutes
Latency	$\leq$15 minutes
Operational temperature	−35 degrees Celsius (−31 degrees Fahrenheit)
Boot mode length	65 – 130 seconds
Telemetry modes	3 – Housekeeping, Science, Engineering
Data transfer speed	25 kilobits per second (average)

Solar eclipse of 2025-09-21 seen by CCOR-1 coronagraph onboard GOES-19.

=== Coronal mass ejection detection ===
CMEs are detected by PyCat – open-source software created by NOAA/SWPC and UK Met Office. It is a modernized version of older CAT. PyCat studies the morphology of the CME using L1 files (check Ground Processing Algorithm below) and compares its appearance across different satellites. Using this data, speed, mass and direction of the ejection are calculated.

== Ground Processing Algorithm ==
After their arrival, data packets from CCOR-1 are decompressed and then reassembled into a FITS file. The data is processed into six levels.

The first processing level (L0) is a raw readout of packets from the detector and metadata (header). Two L0A files are created from L0 – they contain the inner FOV and outer FOV parts of the image. L0B is created by assembling both L0A files and rotating them to align with solar north.

L0B undergoes several calibrations. These are as follows:

- Reconstructing the onboard bias subtraction
- Correcting for detector linearity
- Division by exposure time
- Time normalization
- Storing calibration factor (Data Unit/s/px –> MSB)
- Converting the brightness to MSB (Mean Solar Brightness)
- Vignetting correction

These calibrations create L1A file. L1A is used for creating earthshine and median background models. Earthshine is computed from L1A and then used for subtraction from the image and that creates L1B. It is the only file level available in real time.

=== Median background ===
L1A is used for median background determination. A median background of the entire day is called Daily Median (DM). After that, a minimum background is calculated to mirror a slowly changing stray light and F-corona (F-corona is Sun's light reflected of dust particles). 14 days of median background create Monthly Minimal Background (MM), while 7 days is called Minimal background. L1 products then get processed by subtracting either to get L2 level. L2 binned to 2×2 is L3.

== Comet discoveries ==
A companion of three Kreutz fragments, the brightest one was the first CCOR-1 discovery.

CCOR-1 allows observations of near Sun comets, especially sungrazers. The first discovery was a Kreutz comet found by an American citizen scientist Robert Pickard on 11 February 2025. It was accompanied by two fragments.

By 30 August 2025, 101 comets were discovered via NASA's Sungrazer Project program. The 100th comet found using this instrument was discovered on 29 August 2025 by Jiangao Ruan.
