= C/2019 U5 (PanSTARRS) =

Parabolic comet

Discovery
- Discovered by: Pan-STARRS
- Discovery site: Haleakalā Observatory
- Discovery date: 22 October 2019

Designations
- Alternative designations: A/2019 U5

Orbital characteristics
- Epoch: 27 September 2022 (JD 2459849.5)
- Observation arc: 6.34 years
- Earliest precovery date: 11 October 2019
- Number of observations: 5,421
- Perihelion: 3.624 AU
- Eccentricity: 1.00143
- Orbital period: 5.9 million years (inbound)
- Inclination: 113.52°
- Longitude of ascending node: 2.637°
- Argument of periapsis: 181.51°
- Mean anomaly: –0.001°
- Last perihelion: 29 March 2023
- T_{Jupiter}: –0.942
- Earth MOID: 2.626 AU
- Jupiter MOID: 1.834 AU

Physical characteristics
- Mean radius: 30–47.5 km (18.6–29.5 mi)
- Spectral type: (B−V) = 0.70±0.05; (V−R) = 0.47±0.02; (B−R) = 1.18±0.05
- Absolute magnitude (H): 6.84±0.02
- Comet total magnitude (M1): 8.5
- Apparent magnitude: 10.3 (2023 apparition)

Comet C/2019 U5 (PanSTARRS), formerly known by its provisional designation A/2019 U5, is a distant non-periodic comet moving in a retrograde trajectory around the Sun. It is one of several comets discovered by the Pan-STARRS survey.

== Observational history ==
When it was first discovered in October 2019, it was presumed to be a hyperbolic asteroid. Later observations from September 2020 revealed that weak cometary activity was detected and increasing as it went closer to the Sun. Further observations of a persistent coma seen from Hawaii, Japan, and other European nations confirmed its nature as a comet.

== Physical characteristics ==
Optical photometry obtained from the Sanglokh Observatory (193) between May and September 2022 reveal an absolute magnitude of 6.84±0.02, with color indices suggesting a quasi-steady activity within its coma. Morphological observations while it was 4.63–4.03 AU (693–603 million km) from the Sun also show no signs of jet-like or other structural features within the coma. The comet's nucleus is estimated to be about 60–95 km (37–59 mi) in diameter.

== Orbit ==
Barycentric osculating parameters from HORIZONS show that C/2019 U5 is a dynamically new comet from the Oort cloud. It reached perihelion on 29 March 2023 at a distance of 3.624 AU (542.1 million km) from the Sun. The comet is expected to leave the Solar System on its outbound trajectory.
