= CCOR-2 =

CCOR-2 (Compact CORonograph 2) is the second space coronograph of Compact Coronograph series. It is flying aboard SOLAR-1 spacecraft placed at Lagrange 1 point – about 1.5 million kilometers (~930,000 miles) from the Earth towards the Sun. It orbits the Sun at a distance of 0.974 to 1.006 AU.

It was launched in September 2025 from Florida.

== Mission ==
CCOR-2 provides low latency, high-cadence visible-light images of solar corona and its surroundings. The data is directly fed into space weather prediction software. CCOR coronographs are descendants of aging SOHO/LASCO and STEREO/COR instruments.

It was primarily made for National Oceanic and Atmospheric Administration and Space Weather Prediction Center.

=== Launch and destination ===
CCOR-2 was launched aboard SpaceX Falcon 9 Rocket from Kennedy Space Flight Center at 7:30 AM EDT on 24 September 2025. It reached L1 point on 23 January 2026 – that day its first light image was taken too.

==== Forecasting ====
CCOR data (including CCOR-2) are used for space weather prediction. PyCAT (open source software designed by NOAA/SPWC and UK Met Office) and WSA-Enlil model are fed with coronograph data in order to perform calculations of CME mass, velocity and importantly – direction.

== Parameters and technical data ==
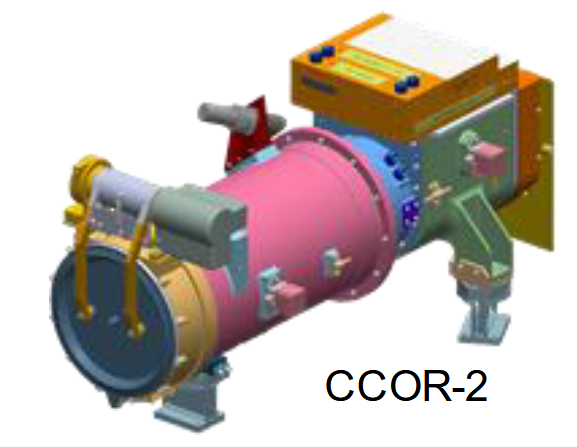
Outside view model of CCOR-2.

CCOR-2 was developed by US Naval Research Laboratory in Washington D.C. It has a length of about 72 centimeters (28.3 in) and its name highlights the small size of the instrument. It features a 2048×1920 pixels Active Pixel Sensor detector which detects wavelengths in the range of ~450 nm to ~750 nm.

The instrument has to follow several requirements, listed below.

- A spatial resolution of ≤70 arcseconds
- Inner FOV geometric cutoff at 3.0 solar radii ($R_{\odot}$)
- Outer FOV at 20 $R_{\odot}$or better
- A signal to noise ratio of 10 in the region between 4.4 $R_{\odot}$ and 22.7 $R_{\odot}$ (1.17° to 6.05°)
- Maximum image latency of 30 minutes
- CME mass estimate with an error of ≤50 per cent for CMEs with mass between $1.0 \times 10^7$kg and $5.0 \times 10^{14}$kg
- A closable outer door
- Full resolution image cadence of 15 minutes or 5 minutes for 2x2 binned images.
- Minimum signal intensity above noise of $\geq 1.0 \times 10^{-11}$ $B_{\odot}$ ($B_{\odot}$ is solar surface brightness – about -10.6 mag/arcsec²)
- Coronal brightness measurement with error up to 10%
- CME velocity estimate with biggest allowed error of 5% in the range of 200 km/s to 3400 km/s
- At least five years of operations with resources enough for additional five years (requirement for entire spacecraft)
- CCOR-2 shall be able to meet all the requirements when observing during an X50 solar flare or S4 class solar storm
- Observing in visible light
- The data must be available for SWPC reach within 30 minutes of its creation
- CCOR shall be capable of surviving 5 years on orbit before start of operations
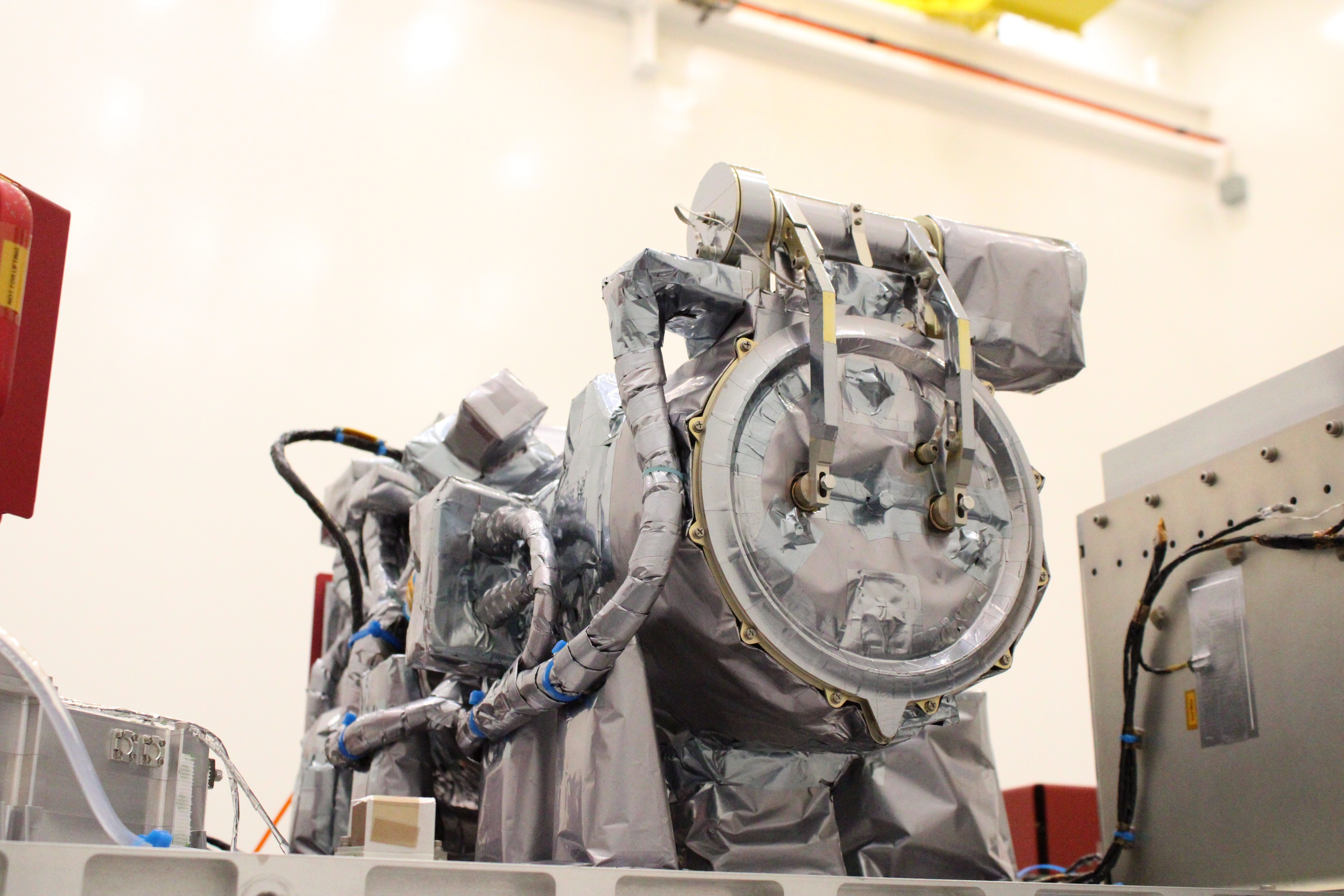
  Front view of the instrument, reclosable door visible.
  CCOR mounted on SOLAR-1

=== Actual specifications ===
Parameter	Value
Total assembly mass	25 kg (55.1 lb)
Mass of Power Supply Box	2.2 kg (4.9 lb)
Power	22.5 watts
Pixel size	10 µm × 10 µm
Detector pixel array	2048 by 1920 pixels
Imaging pixels	2038 by 1910 pixels
Inner FOV geometric cutoff	3.0 $R_{\odot}$
S/N ratio of ≥1 starting at	3.5 $R_{\odot}$
Outer FOV (sides, diagonal)	22.5 $R_{\odot}$, 26.3 $R_{\odot}$
Resolution	65 arcseconds
FOV with that resolution	4 $R_{\odot}$ to 22 $R_{\odot}$
Focal length	85.17 mm
Plate scale	24.27 arcseconds/pixel
Amount of occulting disks (all glued together to form a single one)	24
FWHM bandpass	469 nm – 755 nm
F-number	5.32
Cadence of full resolution images	15 minutes
Latency	≤15 minutes
Data rate	38.7 kbps

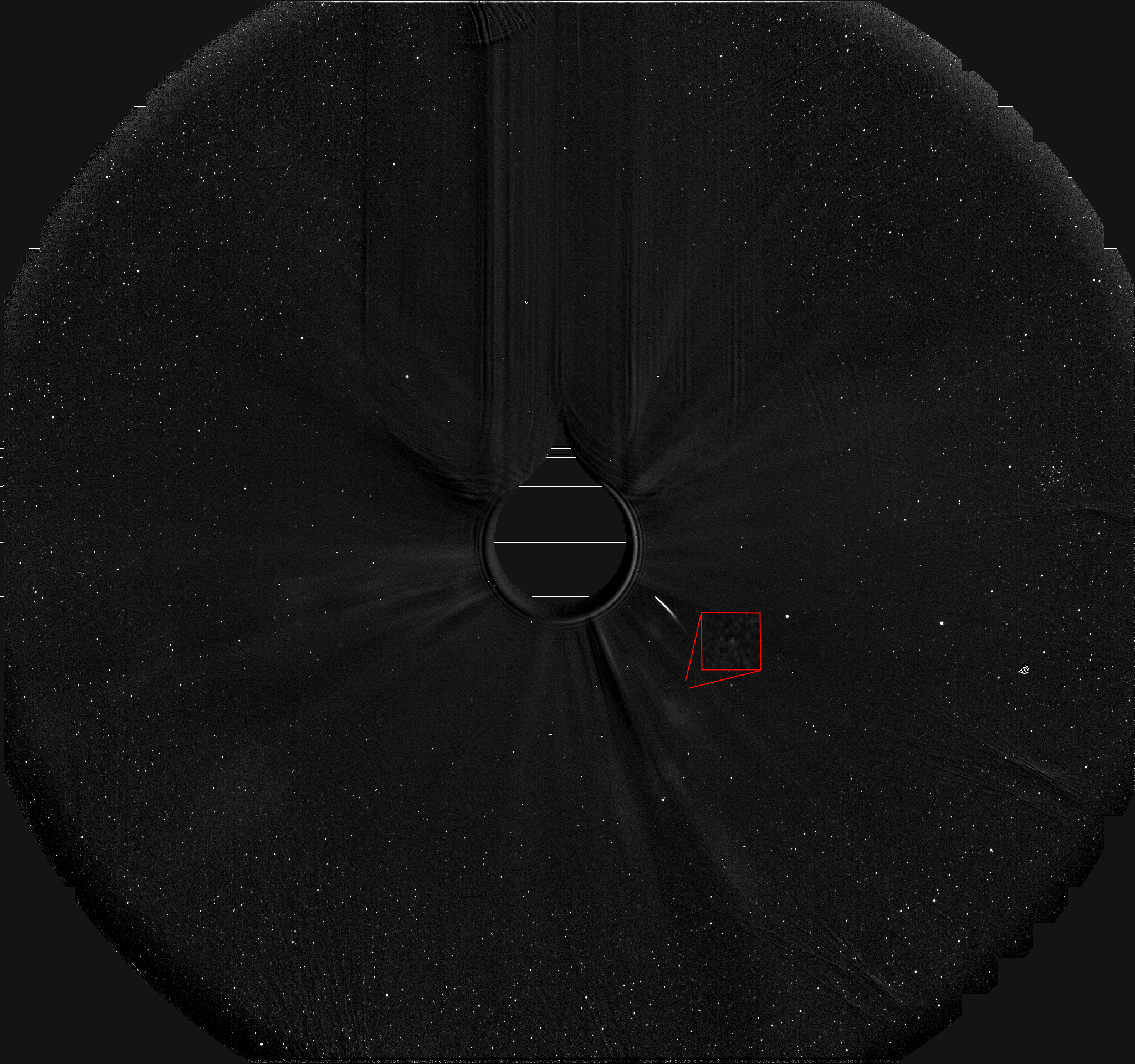
An image taken by a CCOR-2 coronograph at 04:30 AM UT 30 June 2026. A bright Kreutz sungrazer can be sun plunging towards the Sun with its much fainter companion behind. The fainter comet (marked) is the first comet to be found using CCOR-2 data.

CCOR-2 images are available in FITS format, however they are processed do different data processing levels on the ground.

The first level of the images is L0 CCSDS which is a raw readout of detector pixels. L0 CCSDS is then rotated so solar north points upwards which creates a L0B file.

Level 1A image is formed using L0B file by converting DN value of pixel into Mean Solar Brightness unit, division by exposure time, correcting for vignetting and detector linearity rectification. It is the main operational product used for forecasting.

A median background is created from L1 by computing F-corona and stray-light based of the image. L1A with background subtraction, distortion correction application and flat field rectification creates L2 image.

CCOR-2 data is available to the public since 17 June 2026, 15 days after it passed its Provisional-maturity Product Validation Review.

== Comet discoveries ==
A small Kreutz sungrazer was found in the CCOR-2 coronograph images late on 29 June 2026. The discoverer of the object is Michael Stark.
