= C/2021 O3 (PanSTARRS) =

Hyperbolic comet

Discovery
- Discovered by: Robert Weryk
- Discovery site: Pan-STARRS
- Discovery date: 26 July 2021

Orbital characteristics
- Epoch: 30 October 2021 (JD 2459517.5)
- Observation arc: 351 days
- Number of observations: 760
- Orbit type: Oort cloud
- Perihelion: 0.287 AU
- Eccentricity: 1.00015
- Inclination: 56.75°
- Longitude of ascending node: 189.03°
- Argument of periapsis: 299.98°
- Mean anomaly: –0.002°
- Last perihelion: 21 April 2022
- T_{Jupiter}: 0.446
- Earth MOID: 0.063 AU
- Jupiter MOID: 2.165 AU

Physical characteristics
- Mean radius: ~1.0–1.7 km (0.62–1.06 mi)
- Geometric albedo: 0.04 (assumed)
- Comet total magnitude (M1): 10.6
- Apparent magnitude: 7.6 (2022 apparition)

C/2021 O3 (PanSTARRS) is a hyperbolic Oort cloud comet discovered on 26 July 2021 by the Pan-STARRS sky survey. It came to perihelion on 21 April 2022 at 0.287 AU (42.9 million km) from the Sun.

== Observational history ==
The comet was expected to reach apparent magnitude 5.0 by late April 2022, while being only 15 degrees from the Sun. While near perihelion the comet was dimmer than expectations, only reaching magnitude 7.6 at its peak brightness on 19 April 2022. It was faintly visible in STEREO/SECCHI COR2-A on 27 April 2022. Observations by Lowell Discovery Telescope on 29 April in the twilight detected a diffuse glow with a magnitude of 9.0 where the comet was expected to be, indicating that its nucleus disintegrated during perihelion, however follow-up studies in 2025 revealed that this is unlikely and the comet remains intact post-perihelion. C/2021 O3 made its closest approach to Earth on 8 May 2022 at a distance of 0.60 AU (90 million km).

The comet was recovered by multiple observatories after perihelion at magnitudes not too different from those observed pre-perihelion. Calculations carried out using the pre- and post-perihelion orbits indicate that although the comet is probably dynamically old, it may also be a fragment of a dynamically new comet that was released during the first perihelion passage of its parent comet.

== Orbit ==
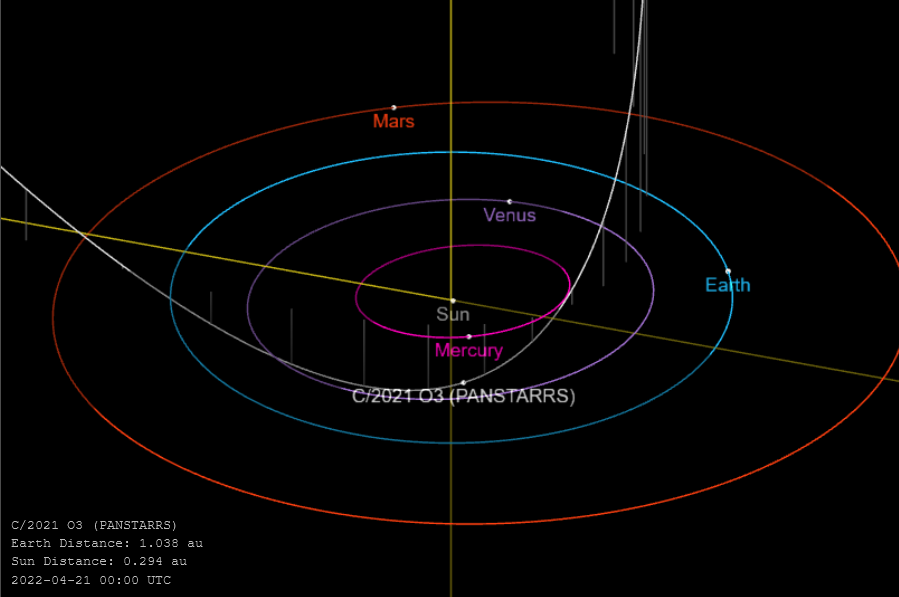
Orbit through inner Solar System

With a short observation arc of 7 days, the Minor Planet Center used an assumed eccentricity of 1.0 for the orbit solution. Due to statistics of small numbers, with a short 10 day arc JPL had an eccentricity of 0.99595±0.00444 which could be as high as 1.00039 or as low as 0.99151. With an observation arc of 53 days, JPL Horizons shows both an inbound and outbound eccentricity greater than 1.

C/2021 O3 likely took millions of years to arrive from the outer Oort cloud and, had it survived, may have been fated to be ejected from the Solar System. This is also the most likely scenario when considering the post-perihelion orbit determination of the surviving object.
