= C/2013 X1 (PanSTARRS) =

Hyperbolic comet

Discovery
- Discovered by: Pan-STARRS
- Discovery date: 4 December 2013

Orbital characteristics
- Epoch: 20 December 2015 (JD 2457376.5)
- Observation arc: 4.28 years
- Earliest precovery date: 17 October 2013
- Number of observations: 539
- Aphelion: ~7,960 AU (inbound)
- Perihelion: 1.314 AU
- Semi-major axis: ~3,980 AU (inbound)
- Eccentricity: 0.99967 (inbound); 1.00047 (outbound)
- Inclination: 163.23°
- Longitude of ascending node: 130.95°
- Argument of periapsis: 164.46°
- Mean anomaly: –0.003°
- Last perihelion: 20 April 2016
- Earth MOID: 0.309 AU
- Jupiter MOID: 1.084 AU

Physical characteristics
- Dimensions: 3.4–7.4 km (2.1–4.6 mi)
- Mean diameter: 5.4 km (3.4 mi)
- Synodic rotation period: 24.02±02 hours
- Comet total magnitude (M1): 10.7
- Apparent magnitude: 6.1 (2016 apparition)

C/2013 X1 (PanSTARRS) is a hyperbolic comet observed through telescopes between October 2013 and January 2018. It is one of many comets discovered by the Pan-STARRS survey.

== Physical characteristics ==
=== Nucleus size ===
Its nucleus has an estimated effective diameter of 5.4 km (3.4 mi).

=== Rotation period ===
Photometric observations conducted in 2016 initially indicated that the comet has a rotation period of 11.95±0.36 hours. Revised geometric models in 2024 revealed that the comet has a longer rotation period of 24.02±0.2 hours.

=== Chemical composition ===
Ground observations conducted at the Special Astrophysical Observatory (SAO) and the Crimean Astrophysical Observatory (CrAO) detected emissions of carbon atoms (C_{2}, C_{3}), cyanogens (CN), and amides (NH_{2}) within the coma.
