= C/2022 A2 (PanSTARRS) =

Parabolic comet

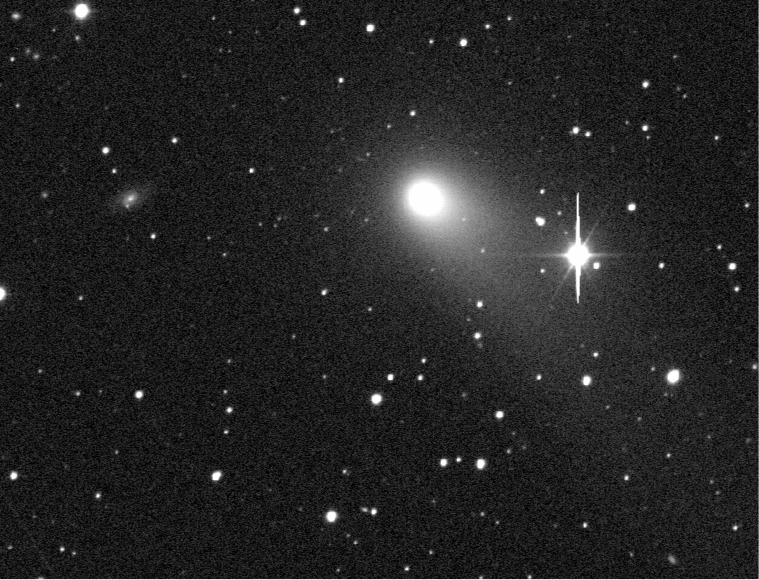
- Comet PanSTARRS photographed from the Zwicky Transient Facility on 12 January 2023

Discovery
- Discovered by: Pan-STARRS; Robert J. Weryk
- Discovery site: Haleakalā Observatory
- Discovery date: 10 January 2022

Designations
- Alternative designations: CK22A020; P21q8AG

Orbital characteristics
- Epoch: 25 April 2023 (JD 2460059.5)
- Observation arc: 935 days (2.56 years)
- Earliest precovery date: 9 January 2022
- Number of observations: 2,731
- Perihelion: 1.735 AU
- Eccentricity: 1.00038
- Inclination: 108.15°
- Longitude of ascending node: 171.58°
- Argument of periapsis: 88.368°
- Last perihelion: 18 February 2023
- Earth MOID: 1.435 AU
- Jupiter MOID: 0.918 AU

Physical characteristics
- Mean radius: 5.12 km (3.18 mi)
- Comet total magnitude (M1): 8.3
- Comet nuclear magnitude (M2): 11.8

Comet PanSTARRS, formal designation C/2022 A2, is a faint non-periodic comet that passed through the inner Solar System in February 2023. It is one of many comets discovered by the Pan-STARRS survey.

== Observational history ==
The comet was discovered as a 20th-magnitude object by the Pan-STARRS telescope of the Haleakalā Observatory on the night of 10 January 2022. Prediscovery images taken a day earlier allowed Shuichi Nakano to refine the first orbital calculations for the comet, which turned out to be hyperbolic.

Between 7 and 10 December 2022, Rob Matson had spotted the comet in images taken by the SWAN instrument aboard the Solar and Heliospheric Observatory (SOHO), indicating that it has brightened more rapidly than expected. Later on 19 December 2022, chemical production rates from the comet were measured by the TRAPPIST telescopes, detecting emissions of OH, CN, as well as C2 and C3-carbon compounds from its coma.

It made its first and last perihelion on 18 February 2023, making its closest approach to the Sun at a distance of 1.735 AU (259.6 million km). It is expected that the comet will be ejected from the Solar System due to its hyperbolic trajectory around the Sun.
