= C/2012 K1 (PanSTARRS) =

Oort cloud comet

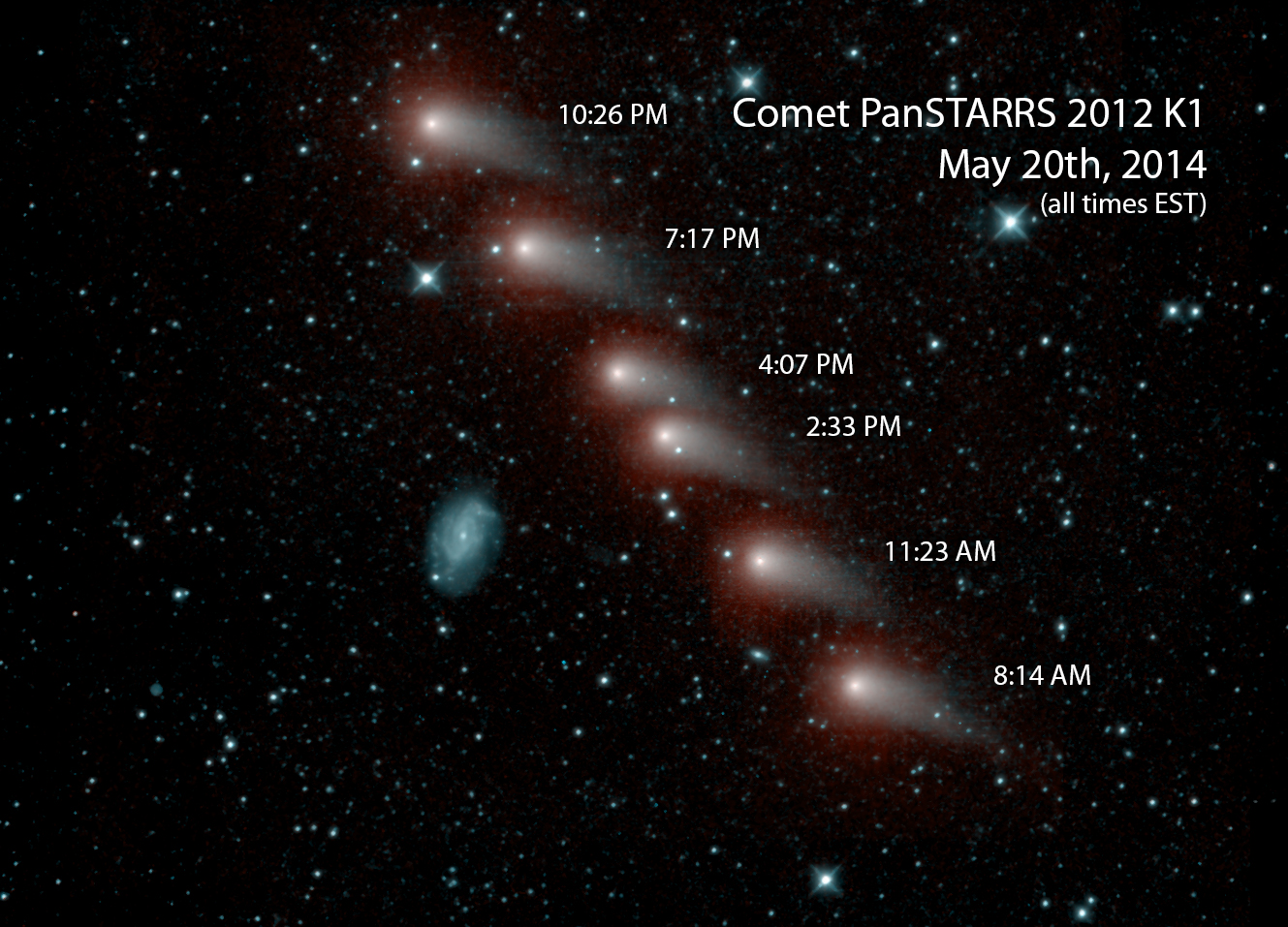
- NEOWISE series of infrared images of C/2012 K1 on 20 May 2014

Discovery
- Discovered by: Pan-STARRS; 1.8-m Ritchey–Chrétien (F51)
- Discovery date: 17 May 2012

Orbital characteristics
- Epoch: 11 August 2014
- Orbit type: Oort cloud
- Aphelion: ~52000 AU (inbound); ~14000 AU (outbound)
- Perihelion: 1.0545 AU (q)
- Eccentricity: 1.00021
- Orbital period: several million years inbound (Barycentric solution for epoch 1950); ~600000 yr outbound (Barycentric solution for epoch 2050)
- Inclination: 142.43°
- Last perihelion: 27 August 2014
- Jupiter MOID: 1.5 AU

Physical characteristics
- Dimensions: 2.4–4.4 km (1.5–2.7 mi)
- Mean diameter: 3.4 km (2.1 mi)
- Mean density: 470±70 kg/m^{3}
- Synodic rotation period: 9.4±0.4 hours

C/2012 K1 (PanSTARRS) is a retrograde Oort cloud comet discovered at magnitude 19.7, 8.7 AU from the Sun on 17 May 2012 using the Pan-STARRS telescope located near the summit of Haleakalā, on the island of Maui in Hawaii (U.S.).

The comet started 2014 as a Northern Hemisphere object. By late April 2014 it had brightened to roughly apparent magnitude ~8.8 making it a small telescope/binoculars target for experienced observers. In June and July 2014 the comet was near the Sickle of Leo. As of 3 July 2014 the comet had brightened to magnitude 7.9.

From 12 July 2014 until 6 September 2014 it had an elongation less than 30 degrees from the Sun. The comet came to perihelion (closest approach to the Sun) on 27 August 2014 at a distance of 1.05 AU (157,000,000 km; 98,000,000 mi) from the Sun. It crosses the celestial equator on 15 September 2014 becoming a Southern Hemisphere object.

The comet peaked around magnitude 6.9 in mid-October 2014 when it had an elongation of around 75 degrees from the Sun. It is visible in binoculars and small telescopes.
