= Comet WISE and NEOWISE =

Comet WISE and Comet NEOWISE may refer to any comets below discovered by the Wide-field Infrared Survey Explorer satellite between 2009 and 2024:

== Periodic comets ==
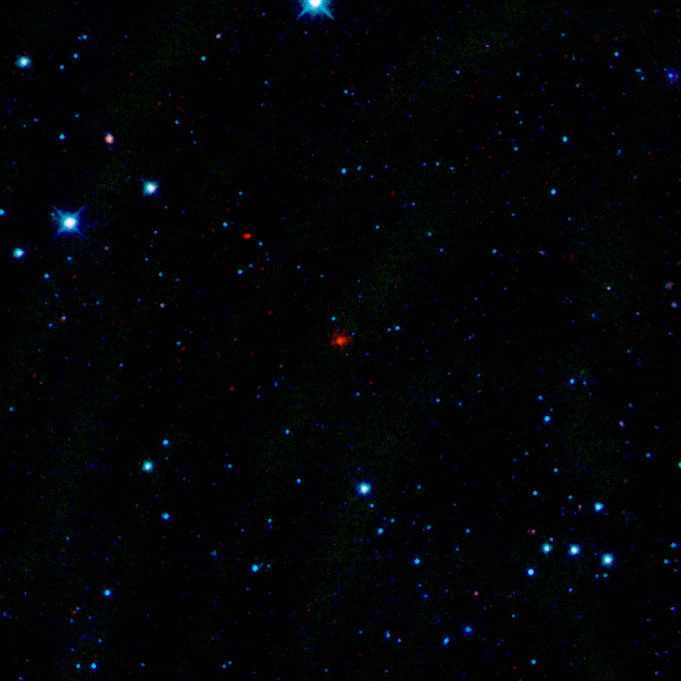
412P/WISE

=== Encke-type Comets ===
- 412P/WISE

=== Jupiter-family Comets ===
- 245P/WISE
- 317P/WISE
- 337P/WISE
- 356P/WISE
- 360P/WISE
- 417P/NEOWISE
- 461P/WISE
- 463P/NEOWISE
- P/2010 D2 (WISE)
- P/2014 L2 (NEOWISE)

=== Halley-type Comets ===
- P/2010 JC81 (WISE)
- C/2010 L5 (WISE)

== Non-periodic comets ==
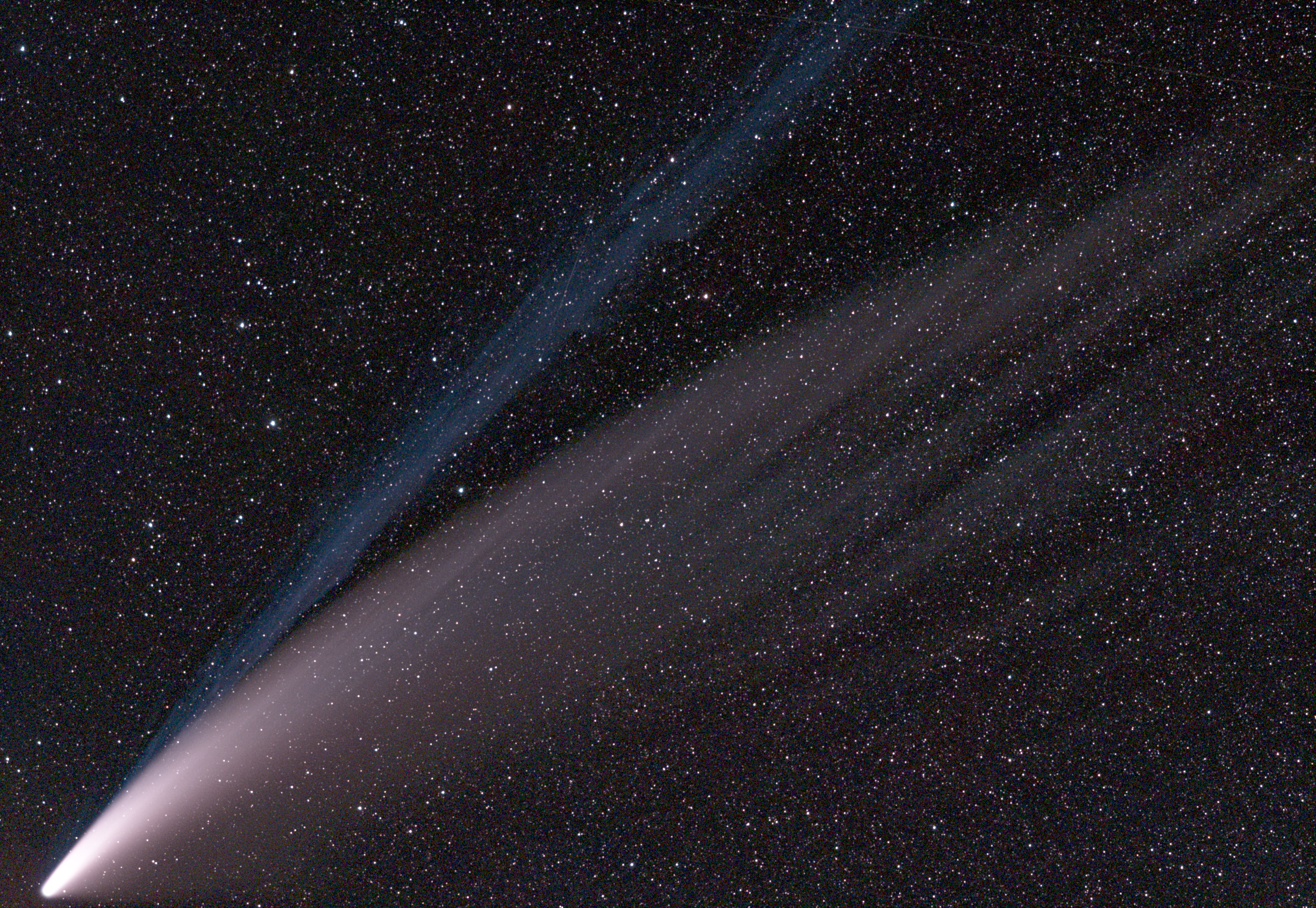
C/2020 F3

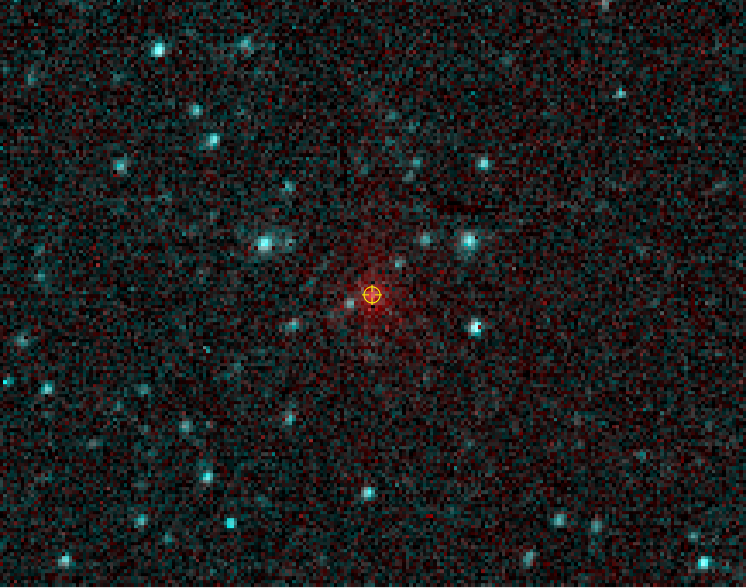
C/2016 U1

=== Near-parabolic comets ===
- C/2010 D3 (WISE)
- C/2010 D4 (WISE)
- C/2010 DG56 (WISE)
- C/2010 E3 (WISE)
- C/2010 G3 (WISE)
- C/2010 J4 (WISE)
- C/2010 KW7 (WISE)
- C/2010 L4 (WISE)
- C/2014 C3 (NEOWISE)
- C/2014 N3 (NEOWISE)
- C/2015 X8 (NEOWISE)
- C/2015 YG1 (NEOWISE)
- C/2016 B1 (NEOWISE)
- C/2016 C2 (NEOWISE)
- C/2017 C1 (NEOWISE)
- C/2018 EN4 (NEOWISE)
- C/2018 N1 (NEOWISE)
- C/2019 H1 (NEOWISE)
- C/2019 L2 (NEOWISE)
- C/2020 F3 (NEOWISE), also known as the Great Comet of 2020
- C/2021 A2 (NEOWISE)
- C/2021 A4 (NEOWISE)
- C/2021 A7 (NEOWISE)
- C/2021 A10 (NEOWISE)
- C/2021 B3 (NEOWISE)
- C/2022 F2 (NEOWISE)
- C/2022 P1 (NEOWISE)

=== Hyperbolic comets ===
- C/2016 U1 (NEOWISE)
- C/2020 P1 (NEOWISE)

== Others ==
"Comet WISE" may also be an incomplete reference to a comet co-discovered by the Wide-field Infrared Survey Explorer satellite. These include:

- 444P/WISE–PanSTARRS
- 453P/WISE–Lemmon
- 504P/WISE–PanSTARRS
- 506P/WISE–LINEAR
- C/2010 FB87 (WISE–Garradd)
