= Comet Palomar =

Comet Palomar may refer to any of the eight comets discovered from the Palomar Observatory below:

- 505P/Palomar
- C/2012 KA51 (Palomar)
- C/2012 LP26 (Palomar)
- C/2013 P3 (Palomar)
- C/2019 J2 (Palomar)
- P/2019 LM4 (Palomar)
- C/2019 O3 (Palomar)
- C/2020 T2 (Palomar)
