= List of near-parabolic comets =

Comets with a period of over 1,000 years

The following is a list of comets with a very high eccentricity (generally 0.99 or higher) and a period of over 1,000 years that do not quite have a high enough velocity to escape the Solar System. Often, these comets, due to their extreme semi-major axes and eccentricity, will have small orbital interactions with planets and minor planets, most often ending up with the comets fluctuating significantly in their orbital path. Some of these comets with orbital periods of millions of years come from the Oort cloud, a cloud of comets orbiting the Sun from ~10,000 to roughly 50,000 AU. The actual orbit of these comets significantly differs from the provided coordinates. A Solar System barycentric orbit computed at an epoch when the object is located beyond all the planets is a more accurate measurement of its long-term orbit.

== Until the 19th century ==
=== Before 1800 ===
Comet designation	Name/ discoverer(s)	Period (years)	e	a (AU)	q (AU)	i (°)	Abs. mag (M1)	Nucleus radii	Perihelion date	Ref
C/1680 V1	Kirch	9370	0.999986	444.4285	0.006222	60.6784			1680/12/18	MPC; JPL
C/1769 P1	Messier	2090	0.999249	163.4554	0.122755	40.7338	3.2		1769/10/08	MPC; JPL
C/1785 E1	Méchain	1325	0.99646	120.6893	0.42724	92.639			1785/04/08	MPC; JPL

=== 1800 to 1849 ===
Comet designation	Name/ discoverer(s)	Period (years)	e	a (AU)	q (AU)	i (°)	Abs. mag (M1)	Nucleus radii	Perihelion date	Ref
C/1807 R1	Parisi	1710	0.995488	143.2012	0.646124	63.1762	1.6		1807/09/19	MPC; JPL
C/1811 F1	Flaugergues	3100	0.995125	212.3922	1.035412	106.9342	0.0		1811/09/12	MPC; JPL
C/1822 N1	Pons	5480	0.996316	310.8303	1.145099	127.3429	3.0		1822/10/24	MPC; JPL
C/1823 Y1	de Bréauté–Pons	2300	0.9987	170	0.2252	103.68	6.5		1823/12/09	MPC; JPL
C/1825 K1	Gambart	3870	0.996395	246.605	0.889011	123.3414			1825/05/31	MPC; JPL
C/1825 N1	Pons	4480	0.995431	271.5793	1.240846	146.4353	2.2		1825/12/11	MPC; JPL
C/1826 P1	Pons	6270	0.997492	340.063	0.852878	25.9496			1826/10/09	MPC; JPL
C/1840 B1	Galle	2430	0.99325	180.8076	1.220451	120.7807			1840/03/13	MPC; JPL
C/1844 N1	Mauvais	208900	0.999757	3520.1687	0.855401	131.4092			1844/10/17	MPC; JPL
C/1844 Y1	Great Comet of 1844	6800	0.999302	358.9355	0.250537	45.5651			1844/12/14	MPC; JPL
C/1846 B1	de Vico	2720	0.992403	194.9063	1.480703	47.4257			1846/01/22	MPC; JPL
C/1847 C1	Hind	10300	0.99991	473.2556	0.042593	48.6636	6.8		1847/03/30	MPC; JPL
C/1847 N1	Mauvais	44280	0.998589	1251.6357	1.766058	96.5817			1847/08/09	MPC; JPL
C/1849 G1	Schweizer	13560	0.998427	568.5696	0.89436	66.9587			1849/06/08	MPC; JPL

=== 1850 to 1899 ===
Comet designation	Name/ discoverer(s)	Period (years)	e	a (AU)	q (AU)	i (°)	Abs. mag (M1)	Nucleus radii	Perihelion date	Ref
C/1850 J1	Petersen	21450	0.998599	771.8979	1.081429	68.1848			1850/07/24	MPC; JPL
C/1854 R1	Klinkerfues	1290	0.993246	118.2650	0.798762	40.9201			1854/10/28	MPC; JPL
C/1854 Y1	Winnecke–Dien	1960	0.991309	156.4219	1.359463	14.152			1854/12/16	MPC; JPL
C/1857 Q1	Klinkerfues	2460	0.996913	182.3447	0.562898	123.9614			1857/10/01	MPC; JPL
C/1858 L1	Donati	1950	0.996295	156.132	0.578469	116.9512	3.3		1858/09/30	MPC; JPL
C/1863 G1	Klinkerfues	45260	0.999159	1269.962	1.068038	112.6209			1863/04/05	MPC; JPL
C/1863 G2	Respighi	17840	0.999079	682.7155	0.628781	85.4961			1863/04/21	MPC; JPL
C/1863 V1	Tempel	15820	0.998879	630.1632	0.706413	78.0817			1863/11/09	MPC; JPL
C/1864 N1	Tempel	3930	0.996351	249.1888	0.90929	178.1269	6.2		1864/08/16	MPC; JPL
C/1864 O1	Donati–Toussaint	55240	0.999358	1450.486	0.931212	109.7124	5.2		1864/10/11	MPC; JPL
C/1871 G1	Winnecke	5180	0.997814	299.3138	0.6543	87.6034			1871/06/11	MPC; JPL
C/1871 V1	Tempel	2050	0.995714	161.2851	0.691268	98.2992			1871/12/20	MPC; JPL
C/1873 Q1	Borrelly	3390	0.996482	225.7138	0.794061	95.9662			1873/09/11	MPC; JPL
C/1873 Q2	Henry	53830	0.99973	1425.6037	0.384913	121.4625			1873/10/02	MPC; JPL
C/1874 H1	Coggia	13710	0.99882	572.6966	0.675782	66.3439	5.2		1874/07/07	MPC; JPL
C/1874 O1	Borrelly	24370	0.998831	840.5894	0.982649	41.8266			1874/08/27	MPC; JPL
C/1877 G1	Winnecke	19750	0.9987	730.7538	0.94998	121.1548			1877/04/18	MPC; JPL
C/1877 G2	Swift	10700	0.997923	485.8223	1.009053	77.1916			1877/04/27	MPC; JPL
C/1881 K1	Tebbutt	2390	0.99589	178	0.734547	63.4253	4.1		1881/06/16	MPC; JPL
C/1881 W1	Swift	2740	0.990169	195.8064	1.924973	144.8016			1881/11/20	MPC; JPL
C/1882 F1	Wells	1019140	0.999994	10127.1667	0.060763	73.7977	4.1		1882/06/11	MPC; JPL
C/1887 J1	Barnard	7640	0.996093	356.7476	1.393813	17.5479			1887/06/17	MPC; JPL
C/1888 D1	Sawerthal	2200	0.995874	169.3582	0.698772	42.2482			1888/03/17	MPC; JPL
C/1888 P1	Brooks	971160	0.999908	9806.8043	0.902226	74.1904			1888/07/31	MPC; JPL
C/1888 U1	Barnard	2400	0.991488	179.494	1.527853	56.3425			1888/09/13	MPC; JPL
C/1889 G1	Barnard	1379700	0.999818	12393.3846	2.255596	163.8517			1889/06/11	MPC; JPL
C/1889 O1	Davidson	9080	0.997611	435.2118	1.039721	65.9916	6.5		1889/07/19	MPC; JPL
C/1890 O2	Denning	61030	0.999187	1550.0898	1.260223	98.9373			1890/09/25	MPC; JPL
C/1890 V1	Zona	11040	0.995872	495.8077	2.046694	154.307			1890/08/07	MPC; JPL
C/1892 E1	Swift	23020	0.998731	809.1663	1.026832	38.7002	3.2		1892/04/07	MPC; JPL
C/1893 N1	Rordame–Quénisset	44150	0.99946	1249.1648	0.674549	159.9804			1893/07/07	MPC; JPL
C/1893 U1	Brooks	3520	0.996489	231.2706	0.811991	129.8233			1893/09/19	MPC; JPL
C/1898 V1	Chase	315460	0.999507	4634.0588	2.2846	22.5046			1898/09/20	MPC; JPL

== 20th century ==
=== 1900s ===
Comet designation	Name/ discoverer(s)	Period (years)	e	a (AU)	q (AU)	i (°)	Abs. mag (M1)	Nucleus radii	Perihelion date	Ref
C/1901 G1	Viscara	210929	0.99993	3543.398	0.245	131.08	1.7		1901/04/24	MPC; JPL
C/1902 R1	Perrine	1403170	0.999968	12533.5625	0.4011	156.3548	6.2		1902/11/24	MPC; JPL
C/1903 A1	Giacobini	43880	0.99967	1244.1242	0.4106	30.9416	8.4		1903/03/16	MPC; JPL
C/1906 B1	Brooks	84552.21	0.999327	1926.3913	1.296	126.4425	7.6		1905/12/22	MPC; JPL
C/1907 L2	Daniel	8750	0.998794	424.6874	0.512173	8.9577	4.2		1907/09/04	MPC; JPL
C/1909 L1	Borrelly–Daniel	2040	0.994762	160.9095	0.842844	52.0803	10.9		1909/06/05	MPC; JPL

=== 1910s ===
Comet designation	Name/ discoverer(s)	Period (years)	e	a (AU)	q (AU)	i (°)	Abs. mag (M1)	Nucleus radii	Perihelion date	Ref
C/1910 A1	Great Daylight Comet of 1910	4142890	0.999995	25795	0.128975	138.7812	5.2		1910/01/17	MPC; JPL
C/1910 P1	Metcalf	940030	0.999797	9596.1232	1.948013	121.0556			1910/09/16	MPC; JPL
C/1911 N1	Kiess	2500	0.9963	184	0.68383	148.42	7.6		1911/06/30	MPC; JPL
C/1911 O1	Brooks	2090	0.997005	163.1454	0.489429	16.4153589	5.4		1911/10/28	MPC; JPL
C/1911 S2	Quénisset	8910	0.998167	429.6907	0.787623	108.1	6.4		1911/11/12	MPC; JPL
C/1913 J1	Schaumasse	5436	0.995288	309.1747	1.456831	152.3673			1913/05/15	MPC; JPL
C/1913 R1	Metcalf	13100	0.99756	555.7869	1.35612	143.3547			1913/09/14	MPC; JPL
C/1914 S1	Campbell?	12350	0.998666	534.2999	0.712756	77.836	6.5		1914/08/05	MPC; JPL
C/1916 G1	Wolf	150900	0.999405	2834.363	1.686446	25.6592			1917/06/17	MPC; JPL

=== 1920s ===
Comet designation	Name/ discoverer(s)	Period (years)	e	a (AU)	q (AU)	i (°)	Abs. mag (M1)	Nucleus radii	Perihelion date	Ref
C/1920 X1	Skjellerup	2700	0.994081	193.9334	1.147892	22.0303	11.9		1920/12/11	MPC; JPL
C/1922 B1	Reid	1400	0.986968	125.0064	1.629083	32.4456			1921/10/28	MPC; JPL
C/1922 W1	Skjellerup	1790	0.993735	147.4206	0.92359	23.3659	7.5		1923/01/04	MPC; JPL
C/1924 F1	Reid	44320	0.998598	1252.2789	1.755695	72.3273			1924/03/13	MPC; JPL
C/1925 F2	Reid	6120	0.995116	334.418	1.633299	26.9797			1925/07/29	MPC; JPL
C/1926 B1	Blathwayt	2350	0.992384	176.6645	1.345477	128.2986			1926/01/02	MPC; JPL
C/1927 E1	Stearns	90990	0.998179	2023.0104	3.683902	87.6525			1927/03/22	MPC; JPL
C/1927 X1	Skjellerup–Maristany	36530	0.99984	1100.9813	0.176157	85.1126	5.2		1927/12/18	MPC; JPL
C/1929 Y1	Wilk	18190	0.999028	691.5998	0.672235	124.5103	8.4		1930/01/22	MPC; JPL

=== 1930s ===
Comet designation	Name/ discoverer(s)	Period (years)	e	a (AU)	q (AU)	i (°)	Abs. mag (M1)	Nucleus radii	Perihelion date	Ref
C/1930 D1	Peltier–Schwassmann–Wachmann	14030	0.998131	581.6554	1.087114	99.883	12.5		1930/11/15	MPC; JPL
C/1931 P1	Ryves	1180	0.999326	111.1632	0.074924	169.2881	7.0		1931/08/25	MPC; JPL
C/1936 K1	Peltier	1550	0.991775	133.7226	1.099868	78.5447	6.8		1936/06/08	MPC; JPL
C/1937 N1	Finsler	13793870	0.999985	57516	0.862744	146.4156	6.1		1937/08/15	MPC; JPL
C/1939 B1	Kozik–Peltier	1770	0.995103	146.3133	0.716496	63.5238	9.2		1939/02/06	MPC; JPL
C/1939 H1	Jurlof–Achmarof–Hassel	6460	0.998477	346.8588	0.528266	138.1212	7.1		1939/04/10	MPC; JPL
C/1939 V1	Friend	6180	0.997192	336.6129	0.945209	92.952	10.2		1939/11/05	MPC; JPL

=== 1940s ===
Comet designation	Name/ discoverer(s)	Period (years)	e	a (AU)	q (AU)	i (°)	Abs. mag (M1)	Nucleus radii	Perihelion date	Ref
C/1941 B2	de Kock–Paraskevopoulos	26100	0.999102	879.7695	0.790033	168.2039	6.0		1941/01/27	MPC; JPL
C/1942 X1	Whipple–Fedtke–Tevzadze	2280	0.992196	173.4555	1.353647	19.7127			1943/02/06	MPC; JPL
C/1944 H1	Väisälä	7140	0.9935	370.9009	2.410856	17.2882			1945/01/04	MPC; JPL
C/1947 F1	Rondanina–Bester	3210	0.997427	217.5667	0.559799	39.3015	9.1		1947/05/20	MPC; JPL
C/1947 X1-A	Southern Comet of 1947	3800	0.999548	243.4336	0.110032	138.5419	6.2		1947/12/02	MPC; JPL
C/1947 X1-B	Southern Comet of 1947	5110	0.999629	296.558	0.110023	138.5332			1947/12/02	MPC; JPL
C/1948 L1	Honda–Bernasconi	67700	0.999875	1661.024	0.207628	23.1489	8.0		1948/05/15	MPC; JPL
C/1948 N1	Wirtanen	242110	0.999352	3884.5787	2.517207	130.2675			1949/05/01	MPC; JPL
C/1948 V1	Eclipse Comet of 1948	95100	0.999935	2083.4	0.135421	23.117	5.5		1948/10/27	MPC; JPL
C/1948 W1	Bester	11490	0.997499	509.1675	1.273428	87.6054	6.0		1948/10/22	MPC; JPL
C/1949 N1	Bappu–Bok–Newkirk	59130	0.998644	1517.8296	2.058177	105.7686			1949/10/26	MPC; JPL

=== 1950s ===
Comet designation	Name/ discoverer(s)	Period (years)	e	a (AU)	q (AU)	i (°)	Abs. mag (M1)	Nucleus radii	Perihelion date	Ref
C/1951 P1	Wilson–Harrington	151100	0.999739	2836.8851	0.740427	152.5337	9.0		1952/01/12	MPC; JPL
C/1952 M1	Peltier	312500	0.999739	4605.0766	1.201925	45.5521			1952/06/15	MPC; JPL
C/1952 Q1	Harrington	8210	0.99591	407.0848	1.664977	59.1154			1953/01/05	MPC; JPL
C/1953 G1	Mrkos–Honda	7750	0.997391	391.7716	1.022132	93.8573	11.1		1953/05/26	MPC; JPL
C/1955 N1	Bakharev–Macfarlane–Krienke	3830	0.994167	244.7197	1.42745	50.0329	4.79		1955/07/11	MPC; JPL
C/1957 P1	Mrkos	13210	0.999365	558.9496	0.354933	93.9411	4.0	12.0 km	1957/08/01	MPC; JPL
C/1958 D1	Burnham	3534880	0.999943	23205.0702	1.322689	15.7879			1958/04/16	MPC; JPL
C/1958 R1	Burnham–Slaughter	1339380	0.999866	12150.7313	1.628198	61.2576	13.7		1959/03/11	MPC; JPL
C/1959 X1	Mrkos	350810	0.999748	4974.0634921	1.253464	19.6339	6.3		1959/11/13	MPC; JPL

=== 1960s ===
Comet designation	Name/ discoverer(s)	Period (years)	e	a (AU)	q (AU)	i (°)	Abs. mag (M1)	Nucleus radii	Perihelion date	Ref
C/1960 Y1	Candy	1080	0.9899	105.1101	1.061612	150.9552	7.9		1961/02/08	MPC; JPL
C/1961 O1	Wilson	34410	0.999962	1057.8684	0.040199	24.2116	8.0		1961/07/17	MPC; JPL
C/1961 R1	Humason	2920	0.989569	204.5261	2.133412	153.278	1.35–3.5		1962/12/10	MPC; JPL
C/1963 F1	Alcock	22300	0.99806	792.3201	1.537101	86.2194	6.6		1963/05/05	MPC; JPL
C/1964 L1	Tomita–Gerber–Honda	1360	0.995933	123.03	0.500363	161.8323	8.5		1964/06/30	MPC; JPL
C/1964 P1	Everhart	6860	0.996513	361.1342	1.259275	67.9689	6.8		1964/08/23	MPC; JPL
C/1965 S1-B	Ikeya–Seki	1060	0.999925	103.7067	0.007778	141.861			1965/10/21	MPC; JPL
C/1966 P1	Kilston	236260	0.999376	3821.7115	2.384748	40.2648	5.0		1966/10/28	MPC; JPL
C/1966 P2	Barbon	37033	0.998183	1111.0435	2.018766	28.7058	5.6		1966/04/17	MPC; JPL
C/1967 Y1	Ikeya–Seki	89490	0.999152	2000.6851	1.696581	129.3153	4.0		1968/02/25	MPC; JPL
C/1968 H1	Tago–Honda–Yamamoto	2300	0.9961	174	0.680378	102.1698	9.8		1968/05/16	MPC; JPL
C/1968 Y1	Thomas	18750	0.995301	705.6891	3.316033	45.2291	5.8		1969/01/12	MPC; JPL
C/1969 O1-A	Kohoutek	87080	0.999125	1964.6686	1.719085	86.3128	9.8		1970/03/21	MPC; JPL
C/1969 T1	Tago–Sato–Kosaka	508060	0.999926	6400	0.4726395	75.81773	5.1	2.2 km	1969/12/21	MPC; JPL
C/1969 Y1	Bennett	1680	0.996193	141.21513	0.537606	90.0394	4.1	3.76 km	1970/03/20	MPC; JPL

=== 1970s ===
Comet designation	Name/ discoverer(s)	Period (years)	e	a (AU)	q (AU)	i (°)	Abs. mag (M1)	Nucleus radii	Perihelion date	Ref
C/1972 E1	Bradfield	11010	0.998126	494.778	0.927214	123.693	8.2		1972/03/27	MPC; JPL
C/1972 F1	Gehrels	35090	0.996943	1071.8224	3.276561	175.616			1971/01/06	MPC; JPL
C/1972 X1	Araya	12551360	0.99991	54008.3111	4.860748	113.0902			1972/12/18	MPC; JPL
C/1973 D1	Kohoutek	35600	0.998723	1082.2388	1.382019	121.5982			1973/06/07	MPC; JPL
C/1974 C1	Bradfield	67680	0.999697	1660.6964	0.503191	61.2842	8.6	5–10 km	1974/03/18	MPC; JPL
C/1974 F1	Lovas	658170	0.999602	7566.4724	3.011456	50.6485			1975/08/22	MPC; JPL
C/1975 T1	Mori–Sato–Fujikawa	15880	0.997461	632	1.603934	97.6077	5.5		1975/12/25	MPC; JPL
C/1975 V1-A	West	558300	0.999971	6780.2069	0.196626	43.0664	5.6		1967/02/25	MPC; JPL
C/1976 D1	Bradfield	1600	0.993811	136.9866	0.84781	46.834			1976/02/24	MPC; JPL
C/1976 J1	Harlan	368920	0.999695	5143.859	1.568877	38.8063			1976/11/03	MPC; JPL
C/1977 R1	Kohler	101000	0.999543	2170	0.9905761	48.71188	7.3		1977/11/10	MPC; JPL
C/1977 V1	Tsuchinshan	972760	0.999633	9817.545	3.603039	168.5495			1977/06/24	MPC; JPL
C/1978 T1	Seargent	3300	0.99832	220	0.36988	67.828	7.7		1978/09/14	MPC; JPL

=== 1980s ===
Comet designation	Name/ discoverer(s)	Period (years)	e	a (AU)	q (AU)	i (°)	Abs. mag (M1)	Nucleus radii	Perihelion date	Ref
C/1980 V1	Meier	4820	0.99468	285	1.51956	100.9864	7.2		1980/12/09	MPC; JPL
C/1980 Y1	Bradfield	29040	0.999725	944.8109	0.259823	138.585	6.9		1980/12/29	MPC; JPL
C/1980 Y2	Panther	66500	0.998991	1640	1.657269	82.64774	6.1		1981/01/27	MPC; JPL
C/1981 H1	Bus	125816	0.999021	2510.8713	2.458143	160.664			1981/07/30	MPC; JPL
C/1981 M1	Gonzalez	239560	0.999395	3857.1917	2.333601	107.1467			1981/03/25	MPC; JPL
C/1982 M1	Austin	35100	0.999396	1072	0.6478114	84.4951	8.8		1982/08/24	MPC; JPL
C/1983 J1	Sugano–Saigusa–Fujikawa	330473.13	0.999901	4779.898	0.471	96.623	12.3	0.37 km	1983/05/01	MPC; JPL
C/1983 N1	IRAS	269180	0.99942	4168.9638	2.417999	138.8364			1983/05/02	MPC; JPL
C/1984 N1	Austin	82260	0.999846	1891.4545	0.291284	164.1533	7.5		1984/08/12	MPC; JPL
C/1984 U1	Shoemaker	38780	0.995209	1145.723	5.489159	179.2123			1984/09/03	MPC; JPL
C/1984 V1	Levy–Rudenko	39600	0.99921	1160	0.917949	65.7146	9.4	1.4 km	1984/12/14	MPC; JPL
C/1984 W2	Hartley	926200	0.999579	9501.7435	4.000234	89.3273			1985/09/28	MPC; JPL
C/1985 R1	Hartley–Good	450000	0.999881	5800	0.694577	79.9294	8.4	0.88 km	1985/12/09	MPC; JPL
C/1986 N1	Churyumov–Solodovnikov	426920	0.999534	5669.7575	2.642107	114.9293			1986/05/06	MPC; JPL
C/1986 V1	Sorrells	2601160	0.999909	18913.7912	1.721155	160.5801			1987/03/09	MPC; JPL
C/1987 B1	Nishikawa–Takamizawa–Tago	2980	0.9958	207	0.869589	172.22989	7.4		1987/03/17	MPC; JPL
C/1987 P1	Bradfield	2123	0.99474	165.2	0.868956	34.08809	6		1987/11/07	MPC; JPL
C/1987 U3	McNaught	8200	0.99792	406	0.84393	97.5751	6.9		1987/12/02	MPC; JPL
C/1988 A1	Liller	3830	0.996565	244.9295	0.841333	73.3224	5.5		1988/03/31	MPC; JPL
C/1988 F1	Levy	12470	0.997816	537.6264	1.174176	62.8074	7.3		1987/11/29	MPC; JPL
C/1988 J1	Shoemaker–Holt	12590	0.99783	541.2286	1.174466	62.8066	8.2		1988/02/14	MPC; JPL
C/1989 A1	Yanaka	53000	0.99866	1410	1.89458	52.4092	5.1		1988/10/31	MPC; JPL
C/1989 A5	Shoemaker	12810	0.99518	547.6156	2.639507	96.5548			1989/02/26	MPC; JPL
C/1989 T1	Helin–Roman–Alu	1190	0.990657	112.097	1.047322	46.0369	10.0		1989/12/15	MPC; JPL

=== 1990s ===
Comet designation	Name/ discoverer(s)	Period (years)	e	a (AU)	q (AU)	i (°)	Abs. mag (M1)	Nucleus radii	Perihelion date	Ref
C/1990 N1	Tsuchiya–Kiuchi	3560	0.995316	233.2246	1.092424	143.7839			1990/09/28	MPC; JPL
C/1991 A2	Arai	1860	0.990507	151.0756	1.434161	70.9783			1990/12/10	MPC; JPL
C/1991 B1	Shoemaker–Levy	6520	0.993508	348.8963	2.265035	77.2881			1991/12/31	MPC; JPL
C/1991 Q1	McNaught–Russell	14310	0.994581	589.3992	3.19395	90.5062			1992/05/03	MPC; JPL
C/1991 R1	McNaught–Russell	1179000	0.999374	11160.2875	6.98634	104.5086			1990/11/12	MPC; JPL
C/1991 T2	Shoemaker–Levy	4650000	0.999860	6000	0.8362597	113.49709	7.7		1992/07/24	MPC; JPL
C/1992 F1	Tanaka–Machholz	5530	0.995966	312.7164	1.261498	79.2924			1992/04/22	MPC; JPL
C/1992 J1	Spacewatch	21409400	0.999961	77102.7179	3.007006	124.3187	8.3		1993/09/05	MPC; JPL
C/1992 U1	Shoemaker	246190	0.999411	3928.1053	2.313654	65.9859			1993/03/25	MPC; JPL
C/1993 Y1	McNaught–Russell	1564	0.99356	134.8	0.8676358	51.5866	12.2	0.75 km	1994/03/31	MPC; JPL
C/1994 E2	Shoemaker–Levy	8960	0.997314	431.4296	1.15882	131.2547			1994/05/27	MPC; JPL
C/1994 G1-A	Takamizawa-Levy	61020	0.999123	1549.8632	1.35923	132.8728			1994/05/22	MPC; JPL
C/1994 J2	Takamizawa	12740	0.996429	545.4374	1.947757	135.9611			1994/06/29	MPC; JPL
C/1994 T1	Machholz	236170	0.999517	3820.7081	1.845402	101.7379			1994/10/02	MPC; JPL
C/1995 O1	Hale–Bopp	2534	0.9950817	185.86	0.9141335	89.430154	2.3	30 km	1997/04/01	MPC; JPL
C/1995 Q1	Bradfield	3280	0.998022	220.6208	0.436388	147.3942	7.1		1995/08/31	MPC; JPL
C/1996 B1	Szczepanski	1965	0.99076	156.9	1.448788	51.9189	7.1		1996/02/06	MPC; JPL
C/1996 B2	Hyakutake	108000	0.9998987	2270	0.2302293	124.92266	7.3	2.4 km	1996/05/01	MPC; JPL
C/1996 Q1	Tabur	22000	0.9989	800	0.83984	73.359	11.0	0.35 km	1996/11/03	MPC; JPL
C/1996 R1	Hergenrother–Spahr	1510	0.9856	132	1.89920	145.8144	5.8		1996/08/28	MPC; JPL
C/1996 R3	Lagerkvist	8120.91	0.987	404.015	5.24	39.2	10.5		1995/07/24	MPC; JPL
C/1997 BA_{6}	Spacewatch	171000	0.998884	3081	3.436463	72.71704	4.9		1999/11/27	MPC; JPL
C/1997 G2	Montani	12160	0.99417	529	3.084966	69.83548	5.3		1998/04/16	MPC; JPL
C/1997 J1	Mueller	4085	0.990991	255.5	2.302132	122.96833	8.6		1997/05/03	MPC; JPL
C/1997 L1	Zhu–Balam	119000	0.99797	2420	4.89956	72.9914	6.5		1996/11/22	MPC; JPL
C/1997 T1	Utsunomiya	27910	0.998523	920	1.3591096	127.99262	8.0	5.8 km	1997/12/10	MPC; JPL
C/1998 H1	Stonehouse	19000	0.9979	710	1.48729	104.693	10.0		1998/04/14	MPC; JPL
C/1998 K2	LINEAR	182000	0.999276	3210	2.323479	64.45667	8.6		1998/09/01	MPC; JPL
C/1998 K3	LINEAR	70000	0.9979	1700	3.5463	160.2056	10.0		1998/03/07	MPC; JPL
C/1998 M1	LINEAR	8950	0.99277	431	3.11812	20.38455	5.4		1998/10/28	MPC; JPL
C/1998 M2	LINEAR	42400	0.997758	1215	2.725333	60.18232	8.5		1998/08/13	MPC; JPL
C/1998 M4	LINEAR	30000	0.998	1100	2.6001	154.572	9.5		1997/12/10	MPC; JPL
C/1998 M5	LINEAR	9176	0.996025	438.3	1.7422899	82.22889	8.0		1999/01/24	MPC; JPL
C/1998 M6	Montani	400000	0.9989	5400	5.9787	91.540	7.5		1998/10/06	MPC; JPL
C/1998 P1	Williams	70000	0.999325	1700	1.146108	145.72831	8.0		1998/10/17	MPC; JPL
C/1998 Q1	LINEAR	6770	0.99559	358	1.57788	32.3058	14.0		1998/06/29	MPC; JPL
C/1998 T1	LINEAR	67400	0.999114	1657	1.467728	170.15995	9.5		1999/06/25	MPC; JPL
C/1998 U5	LINEAR	1043.5	0.987981	102.88	1.2364530	131.76474	10.9		1998/12/21	MPC; JPL
C/1999 A1	Tilbrook	2350	0.99587	177	0.730741	89.481	12.0		1999/01/29	MPC; JPL
C/1999 F1	Catalina	548000	0.999136	6700	5.787022	92.03554	4.6		2002/02/13	MPC; JPL
C/1999 F2	Dalcanton	135000	0.99821	2640	4.71807	56.42742	7.6	18.18 km	1998/08/23	MPC; JPL
C/1999 H1	Lee	146200	0.9997449	2775	0.70810722	149.35290	9.4	6.29 km	1999/07/11	MPC; JPL
C/1999 J3	LINEAR	64000	0.99939	1600	0.976809	101.6561	11.3	0.71 km	1999/09/20	MPC; JPL
C/1999 K2	Ferris	1920	0.9658	155	5.2903	82.191	7.0		1999/04/10	MPC; JPL
C/1999 K3	LINEAR	3600	0.9918	235	1.92878	92.274	12.0		1999/02/27	MPC; JPL
C/1999 K6	LINEAR	6459	0.993532	346.8	2.246976	46.34384	11.3		1999/07/24	MPC; JPL
C/1999 K7	LINEAR	18000	0.9966	700	2.3227	135.159	13.0		1999/02/24	MPC; JPL
C/1999 L2	LINEAR	7800	0.9951	390	1.90476	43.942	13.0		1999/08/04	MPC; JPL
C/1999 N2	Lynn	5150	0.99745	298	0.7612844	111.6559	10.3	2.195 km	1999/07/23	MPC; JPL
C/1999 T1	McNaught–Hartley	740000	0.999856	8100	1.1716989	79.97521	8.6		2000/12/13	MPC; JPL

== 21st century ==
=== 2000 ===
Comet designation	Name/ discoverer(s)	Period (years)	e	a (AU)	q (AU)	i (°)	Abs. mag (M1)	Nucleus radii	Perihelion date	Ref
C/2000 B2	LINEAR	500000	0.9994	6000	3.7762	93.647	10.3		1999/11/10	MPC; JPL
C/2000 CT_{54}	LINEAR	83900	0.998353	1916	3.155967	49.21252	7.4		2001/06/19	MPC; JPL
C/2000 K2	LINEAR	11930	0.995332	522.0	2.437066	25.63358	9.3	12.36 km	2000/10/11	MPC; JPL
C/2000 Y2	Skiff	10850	0.99435	490	2.76871	12.0875	11.4	4.41 km	2001/03/21	MPC; JPL

=== 2001 ===
Comet designation	Name/ discoverer(s)	Period (years)	e	a (AU)	q (AU)	i (°)	Abs. mag (M1)	Nucleus radii	Perihelion date	Ref
C/2001 A1	LINEAR	4330	0.99095	266	2.4064	59.941	12.7		2000/09/17	MPC; JPL
C/2001 A2-A	LINEAR	130000	0.99969	2500	0.779054	36.487	13	3.0 km	2001/05/24	MPC; JPL
C/2001 A2-B	LINEAR	37400	0.999304	1119	0.7790172	36.47582	7		2001/05/24	MPC; JPL
C/2001 C1	LINEAR	7000000	0.99987	38000	5.10432	68.96470	6.5		2002/03/28	MPC; JPL
C/2001 HT_{50}	LINEAR–NEAT	41230	0.9976606	1193.5	2.7920832	163.212126	7.4		2003/07/09	MPC; JPL
C/2001 K3	Skiff	153000	0.99893	2870	3.06012	52.0265	9.4		2001/04/22	MPC; JPL
C/2001 K5	LINEAR	1220000	0.999546	11410	5.184246	72.590342	4.4		2002/10/11	MPC; JPL
C/2001 O2	NEAT	103000	0.9978	2200	4.8194	90.9262	6.6		1999/10/17	MPC; JPL
C/2001 Q1	NEAT	2241	0.96593	171.2	5.83397	66.9504	7.7	4.0 km	2001/09/20	MPC; JPL
C/2001 U6	LINEAR	39000	0.99617	1149	4.40642	107.25550	6.5		2002/08/08	MPC; JPL
C/2001 W1	LINEAR	100000	0.9989	2100	2.39924	118.645	13.7		2001/12/24	MPC; JPL
C/2001 X1	LINEAR	13500	0.99700	570	1.69793	115.6268	11.3		2002/01/08	MPC; JPL

=== 2002 ===
Comet designation	Name/ discoverer(s)	Period (years)	e	a (AU)	q (AU)	i (°)	Abs. mag (M1)	Nucleus radii	Perihelion date	Ref
C/2002 B2	LINEAR	50000	0.9972	1400	3.8422	152.8726	10.1	11 km	2002/04/06	MPC; JPL
C/2002 C2	LINEAR	860000	0.99964	9000	3.25375	104.88143	9.9		2002/04/10	MPC; JPL
C/2002 F1	Utsunomiya	29300	0.999539	950	0.4382989	80.8770	10.5		2002/04/22	MPC; JPL
C/2002 H2	LINEAR	4570	0.99407	276	1.63484	110.5011	10.5		2002/03/23	MPC; JPL
C/2002 J4	NEAT	4900000	0.999874	29000	3.633722	46.52550	8.4		2003/10/03	MPC; JPL
C/2002 K1	NEAT	900000	0.9997	9000	3.23024	89.723	11.4		2002/06/16	MPC; JPL
C/2002 K2	LINEAR	21100	0.99314	763	5.23506	130.8957	8.2		2002/06/05	MPC; JPL
C/2002 L9	NEAT	297000	0.99842	4460	7.03301	68.44211	4.7	58.9 km	2004/04/05	MPC; JPL
C/2002 O6	SWAN	6500	0.99858	350	0.494648	58.6240	13.0		2002/09/09	MPC; JPL
C/2002 P1	NEAT	8420	0.98422	414	6.5302	34.6061	8.2		2001/11/23	MPC; JPL
C/2002 Q3-A	LINEAR	10038.16	0.997194	465.333	1.30583	96.87858	16.4		2002/08/19	MPC; JPL
C/2002 V1	NEAT	32100	0.9999018	1011	0.0992581	81.70600	6.2	1.57 km	2003/02/18	MPC; JPL
C/2002 V2	LINEAR	355000	0.99864	5010	6.81203	166.77622	8.4	30.7 km	2003/03/13	MPC; JPL
C/2002 VQ_{94}	LINEAR	2874.1	0.966377	202.14	6.796713	70.51612	7.1	40.7 km	2006/02/06	MPC; JPL
C/2002 X1	LINEAR	51020	0.998192	1376	2.4867001	164.08943	9.8	12.3 km	2003/07/12	MPC; JPL
C/2002 X5	Kudo–Fujikawa	42000	0.999843	1210	0.189935	94.15226	10.6	1.1 km	2003/01/29	MPC; JPL
C/2002 Y1	Juels–Holvorcem	3967	0.997152	250.6	0.7138096	103.78154	9.8	3.89 km	2003/04/13	MPC; JPL

=== 2003 ===
Comet designation	Name/ discoverer(s)	Period (years)	e	a (AU)	q (AU)	i (°)	Abs. mag (M1)	Nucleus radii	Perihelion date	Ref
C/2003 G2	LINEAR	9000	0.9965	440	1.55337	96.167	16.0		2003/04/29	MPC; JPL
C/2003 H1	LINEAR	136700	0.999156	2653	2.2396301	138.667242	8.7		2004/02/22	MPC; JPL
C/2003 H3	NEAT	1510000	0.999780	13200	2.901441	42.81171	9.6		2003/04/24	MPC; JPL
C/2003 J1	NEAT	13900	0.99112	577	5.12542	98.3135	8.8		2003/10/10	MPC; JPL
C/2003 L2	LINEAR	1918.7	0.981446	154.40	2.864801	82.05107	9.9		2004/01/19	MPC; JPL
C/2003 T2	LINEAR	520000	0.99972	6400	1.786352	87.5315	9.8		2003/11/14	MPC; JPL
C/2003 T3	Tabur	434000	0.999742	5730	1.4810758	50.44443	5.8		2004/04/29	MPC; JPL
C/2003 V1	LINEAR	14800	0.99704	603	1.78314	28.67513	9.9		2003/03/11	MPC; JPL

=== 2004 ===
Comet designation	Name/ discoverer(s)	Period (years)	e	a (AU)	q (AU)	i (°)	Abs. mag (M1)	Nucleus radii	Perihelion date	Ref
C/2004 F2	LINEAR	1870	0.99056	151.6	1.43044	104.9600	13.2		2003/12/26	MPC; JPL
C/2004 F4	Bradfield	3680	0.999294	238	0.168266	63.16456	11.3		2004/04/17	MPC; JPL
C/2004 G1	LINEAR	5953.27	0.996	328.47	1.201	114.486	14.4		2004/06/04	MPC; JPL
C/2004 K1	Catalina (CSS)	77600	0.998131	1819	3.399147	153.747521	7.9		2005/07/05	MPC; JPL
C/2004 L1	LINEAR	25100	0.997615	858	2.04741344	159.36082	12.6		2005/03/30	MPC; JPL
C/2004 L2	LINEAR	22190	0.995215	790	3.778629	62.51864	8.3		2005/11/15	MPC; JPL
C/2004 P1	NEAT	720000	0.99925	8100	6.01377	28.8163	10.1		2003/08/08	MPC; JPL
C/2004 Q1	Tucker	2552.8	0.989042	186.78	2.0467255	56.08768	9.8		2004/12/06	MPC; JPL
C/2004 Q2	Machholz	117800	0.9994986	2403	1.2050414	38.588963	9.9	3.0 km	2005/01/24	MPC; JPL
C/2004 RG_{113}	LINEAR	18540	0.997227	700	1.942359	21.61823	13.9	4.4 km	2005/03/03	MPC; JPL
C/2004 T3	Siding Spring	420000	0.99842	5600	8.8644	71.9642	6.6		2003/04/15	MPC; JPL
C/2004 U1	LINEAR	217000	0.999264	3610	2.659321	130.62532	9.0		2004/12/08	MPC; JPL
C/2004 X2	LINEAR	55000	0.99738	1450	3.79308	72.118	10.2	10.5 km	2004/08/24	MPC; JPL
C/2004 YJ_{35}	LINEAR	1500000	0.99987	13000	1.781202	52.47641	17.3	3.0 km	2005/03/03	MPC; JPL

=== 2005 ===
Comet designation	Name/ discoverer(s)	Period (years)	e	a (AU)	q (AU)	i (°)	Abs. mag (M1)	Nucleus radii	Perihelion date	Ref
C/2005 G1	LINEAR	2600000	0.99974	18800	4.960798	108.41395	7.7	18.9 km	2006/02/27	MPC; JPL
C/2005 L3	McNaught	1550000	0.999582	13390	5.593622	139.449248	6.4	30.52 km	2008/01/16	MPC; JPL
C/2005 N1	Juels–Holvorcem	19700	0.998457	729	1.125447	51.18017	11.3		2005/08/22	MPC; JPL
C/2005 R4	LINEAR	94000	0.99749	2067	5.188473	164.01260	7.7		2006/03/08	MPC; JPL
C/2005 S4	McNaught	430000	0.998972	5690	5.850109	107.95897	7.9		2007/07/18	MPC; JPL
C/2005 X1	Beshore	18000	0.9958	690	2.8623	91.944	11.1		2005/07/05	MPC; JPL
C/2005 YW	LINEAR	2628	0.989534	190.4	1.9930109	40.54361	7.4	6.9 km	2006/12/07	MPC; JPL

=== 2006 ===
Comet designation	Name/ discoverer(s)	Period (years)	e	a (AU)	q (AU)	i (°)	Abs. mag (M1)	Nucleus radii	Perihelion date	Ref
C/2006 A1	Pojmański	115000	0.999765	2370	0.5553959	92.73611	10.5		2006/02/22	MPC; JPL
C/2006 A2	Catalina	240000	0.99862	3800	5.3160	148.3226	9.8		2005/05/20	MPC; JPL
C/2006 B1	McNaught	49100	0.99776	1340	2.997591	134.28193	10.3		2005/11/19	MPC; JPL
C/2006 CK_{10}	Catalina	3182	0.991900	216.32	1.7521694	144.26278	12.3		2006/07/03	MPC; JPL
C/2006 K4	NEAT	77500	0.998246	1818	3.188618	111.33346	8.8		2007/11/29	MPC; JPL
C/2006 L1	Garradd	12930	0.997345	551	1.462070	143.24257	8.6		2006/10/18	MPC; JPL
C/2006 M1	LINEAR	1905.0	0.976859	153.67	3.556199	54.87693	9.6	16.3 km	2007/02/13	MPC; JPL
C/2006 O2	Garradd	8700	0.99634	420	1.55479	43.0287	12.7		2006/10/05	MPC; JPL
C/2006 Q1	McNaught	571000	0.9995986	6890	2.7637144	59.050380	7.0	8.115 km	2008/07/03	MPC; JPL
C/2006 U6	Spacewatch	84900	0.998706	1931	2.4983978	84.87894	8.8		2008/06/05	MPC; JPL
C/2006 V1	Catalina	4136	0.989618	257.6	2.674906	31.11947	9.0		2007/11/26	MPC; JPL
C/2006 W3	Christensen	2410000	0.9998262	17990	3.1262325	127.074692	6.7	13 km	2009/07/06	MPC; JPL
C/2006 WD_{4}	Lemmon	14110	0.998987	583.8	0.5912444	152.70463	17.4	1.4 km	2007/04/28	MPC; JPL
C/2006 XA_{1}	LINEAR	4000	0.992839	252.0	1.804374	30.62941	7.4	8.6 km	2007/07/21	MPC; JPL

=== 2007 ===
Comet designation	Name/ discoverer(s)	Period (years)	e	a (AU)	q (AU)	i (°)	Abs. mag (M1)	Nucleus radii	Perihelion date	Ref
C/2007 B2	Skiff	20020	0.995965	737.2	2.9749171	27.49527	8.1	6.8 km	2008/08/20	MPC; JPL
C/2007 D1	LINEAR	≈25087000	0.99995	171366.7	8.793	41.50701	8.9	8.0 km	2007/06/18	MPC; JPL
C/2007 D3	LINEAR	16650	0.99201	652	5.20897	45.92022	9.2	2.0 km	2007/05/27	MPC; JPL
C/2007 E2	Lovejoy	49000	0.99918	1330	1.092939	95.8830	10.9		2007/03/27	MPC; JPL
C/2007 K1	Lemmon	9100	0.97880	436	9.23905	108.4325	8.6		2007/05/07	MPC; JPL
C/2007 K6	McNaught	3350	0.9847	224	3.4330	105.064	10.6		2007/07/01	MPC; JPL
C/2007 M1	McNaught	61900	0.99522	1564	7.47465	139.72142	5.6	20.56 km	2008/08/11	MPC; JPL
C/2007 M2	Catalina	392000	0.999339	5360	3.541050	80.94565	9.0	4.98 km	2008/12/08	MPC; JPL
C/2007 M3	LINEAR	2245	0.979768	171.45	3.468759	161.76086	9.9		2007/09/04	MPC; JPL
C/2007 N3	Lulin	19500000	0.9999833	72000	1.21225837	178.373611	9.7	6.1 km	2009/01/10	MPC; JPL
C/2007 T1	McNaught	256000	0.999760	4040	0.9685028	117.64244	11.1		2007/12/12	MPC; JPL
C/2007 VO_{53}	Spacewatch	1350000	0.999603	12200	4.842732	86.99476	7.1	7.05 km	2010/04/26	MPC; JPL
C/2007 Y2	McNaught	42100	0.99652	1210	4.20896	98.50321	9.2		2008/04/08	MPC; JPL

=== 2008 ===
Comet designation	Name/ discoverer(s)	Period (years)	e	a (AU)	q (AU)	i (°)	Abs. mag (M1)	Nucleus radii	Perihelion date	Ref
C/2008 C1	Chen–Gao	too uncertain to determine	0.9999876	101627.54	1.262343	61.7845	11.7		2008/04/16	MPC; JPL
C/2008 E3	Garradd	229000	0.99852	3740	5.53103	105.07653	5.1	11.415 km	2008/08/02	MPC; JPL
C/2008 G1	Gibbs	6980	0.98908	365	3.9898	72.856	10.5		2009/01/11	MPC; JPL
C/2008 J1	Boattini	2140.1	0.989617	166.07	1.7242934	61.78002	8.8		2008/07/13	MPC; JPL
C/2008 L3	Hill	5900	0.9939	330	2.0113	100.201	10.6		2008/04/22	MPC; JPL
C/2008 N1	Holmes	30360	0.997140	973.1	2.7835117	115.52100	9.9	2.775–2.95 km	2009/09/25	MPC; JPL
C/2008 Q1	Maticic	14460	0.995015	593.6	2.959143	118.62662	9.8	3.35–3.445 km	2008/12/30	MPC; JPL
C/2008 Q3	Garradd	840000	0.999799	8900	1.7982291	140.70663	6.1	3.35 km	2009/06/23	MPC; JPL

=== 2009 ===
Comet designation	Name/ discoverer(s)	Period (years)	e	a (AU)	q (AU)	i (°)	Abs. mag (M1)	Nucleus radii	Perihelion date	Ref
C/2009 F1	Larson	1090	0.9827	106	1.8307	171.3755	15.1		2009/06/25	MPC; JPL
C/2009 F2	McNaught	6440	0.98303	346.1	5.87503	59.36694	4.9	5.95–7.15 km	2009/11/14	MPC; JPL
C/2009 F6	Yi–SWAN	11590	0.997512	512.2	1.274159	85.76481	9.7	2.54 km	2009/05/07	MPC; JPL
C/2009 K2	Catalina	55800	0.997776	1460	3.246173	66.82192	11.8	1.92 km	2010/02/07	MPC; JPL
C/2009 O2	Catalina	4643	0.997501	278.3	0.6955493	107.96052	12.3		2010/03/24	MPC; JPL
C/2009 T1	McNaught	223000	0.99831	3680	6.22041	89.89396	8.5	6.01 km	2009/10/08	MPC; JPL
C/2009 T3	LINEAR	282000	0.999470	4300	2.281140	148.74183	13.5	1.835 km	2010/01/12	MPC; JPL
C/2009 U3	Hill	2175	0.991575	167.88	1.414424	51.26077	12.6	0.765 km	2010/03/20	MPC; JPL
C/2009 U5	Grauer	1090000	0.99943	10600	6.09424	25.4726	9.1	7.0 km	2010/06/22	MPC; JPL
C/2009 W2	Boattini	1900000	0.99956	16000	6.90713	164.49053	6.9		2010/05/01	MPC; JPL
C/2009 Y1	Catalina	7273	0.993285	375.4	2.5204945	107.31660	6.5	3.295 km	2011/01/28	MPC; JPL

=== 2010 ===
Comet designation	Name/ discoverer(s)	Period (years)	e	a (AU)	q (AU)	i (°)	Abs. mag (M1)	Nucleus radii	Perihelion date	Ref
C/2010 A4	Siding Spring	5001	0.990638	292.4	2.737999	96.73015	7.4	2.73 km	2010/10/08	MPC; JPL
C/2010 B1	Cardinal	158700	0.998997	2932	2.9414900	101.97777	10.0	6.425 km	2011/02/07	MPC; JPL
C/2010 D3	WISE	1250000	0.99963	11600	4.24754	76.39488	10.0	1.05 km	2010/09/03	MPC; JPL
C/2010 E1	Garradd	1160	0.9759	110.4	2.66219	71.698	11.8	2.145 km	2009/11/07	MPC; JPL
C/2010 FB_{87}	WISE–Garradd	5177	0.990500	299.3	2.842764	107.62532	8.5	2.44 km	2010/11/07	MPC; JPL
C/2010 G1	Boattini	10000	0.9975	480	1.20455	78.3870	13.1		2010/04/02	MPC; JPL
C/2010 G3	WISE	135000	0.99814	2630	4.90765	108.26760	8.9	3.82 km	2010/04/11	MPC; JPL
C/2010 H1	Garradd	800000	0.99967	8400	2.74555	36.5317	12.4	1.07 km	2010/06/18	MPC; JPL
C/2010 J2	McNaught	500000	0.999460	6300	3.386994	125.85156	10.4	4.65 km	2010/06/03	MPC; JPL
C/2010 L3	Catalina	1400000	0.99923	12800	9.88290	102.63105	4.7		2010/11/10	MPC; JPL

=== 2011 ===
Comet designation	Name/ discoverer(s)	Period (years)	e	a (AU)	q (AU)	i (°)	Abs. mag (M1)	Nucleus radii	Perihelion date	Ref
C/2011 A3	Gibbs	39900	0.997992	1167	2.344839	26.07435	9.7		2011/12/16	MPC; JPL
C/2011 C1	McNaught	6380	0.997433	344.1	0.8833784	16.82561	12.7		2011/04/18	MPC; JPL
C/2011 C3	Gibbs	5700	0.99527	320	1.51689	49.3760	14.1		2011/04/07	MPC; JPL
C/2011 F1	LINEAR	146000	0.999345	2780	1.818266	56.61904	8.3		2013/01/07	MPC; JPL
C/2011 N2	McNaught	353783	0.9997	10000	2.5634	33.675	6.3		2011/10/18	MPC; JPL
C/2011 O1	LINEAR	42100	0.996785	1210	3.890653	76.49889	7.2		2012/08/18	MPC; JPL
C/2011 Q1	PanSTARRS	190000	0.9979	3300	6.78009	94.8620	7.5		2011/06/29	MPC; JPL

=== 2012 ===
Comet designation	Name/ discoverer(s)	Period (years)	e	a (AU)	q (AU)	i (°)	Abs. mag (M1)	Nucleus radii	Perihelion date	Ref
C/2012 A2	LINEAR	30590	0.996384	978.2	3.5374738	125.868509	8.4		2012/11/05	MPC; JPL
C/2012 C1	McNaught	45500	0.99620	1274	4.837975	96.27770	5.4		2013/02/04	MPC; JPL
C/2012 CH_{17}	MOSS	too uncertain to determine	0.999991	139913.5	1.296092	27.74418	11.1		2012/09/28	MPC; JPL
C/2012 E1	Hill	231000	0.99801	3760	7.50290	122.54208	5.7		2011/07/04	MPC; JPL
C/2012 E3	PanSTARRS	3280	0.9827	221	3.8274	105.658	9.9		2011/05/12	MPC; JPL
C/2012 F6	Lemmon	10750	0.9984987	487.1	0.7312382	82.60885	5.5	2.151 km	2013/03/24	MPC; JPL
C/2012 K5	LINEAR	21550	0.9985256	774.4	1.14181083	92.848032	10.5		2012/11/28	MPC; JPL
C/2012 K6	McNaught	265000	0.999188	4130	3.353033	135.21497	8.8	3.0 km	2013/05/21	MPC; JPL
C/2012 KA_{51}	Palomar	24132	0.99414	835.13	4.895	70.705	6.7		2011/11/01	MPC; JPL
C/2012 L1	LINEAR	21250	0.997051	767.3	2.262410	87.21917	11.9		2012/12/25	MPC; JPL
C/2012 L2	LINEAR	13370	0.997322	563.4	1.5085342	70.98049	9.5		2013/05/09	MPC; JPL
C/2012 L3	LINEAR	6020	0.99079	331	3.04503	134.19664	9.0		2012/06/12	MPC; JPL
C/2012 LP_{26}	Palomar	505000	0.99897	6350	6.53605	25.37958	8.8		2015/08/16	MPC; JPL
C/2012 OP	Siding Spring	34200	0.99658	1054	3.60707	114.82872	11.2		2012/12/04	MPC; JPL
C/2012 S4	PanSTARRS	too uncertain to determine	0.999983	252223.8	4.34873	126.54131	9.2		2013/06/28	MPC; JPL
C/2012 T4	McNaught	1200	0.983	110	1.953	24.092	12.7		2012/10/10	MPC; JPL
C/2012 U1	PanSTARRS	1330649	0.99957	12200	5.26390	56.33902	8.3		2014/07/04	MPC; JPL
C/2012 V1	PanSTARRS	230000	0.99945	3800	2.0890	157.8399	11.5		2013/07/21	MPC; JPL
C/2012 V2	LINEAR	15320	0.997641	616.7	1.4547602	67.18470	8.4		2013/08/16	MPC; JPL
C/2012 X1	LINEAR	1962	0.989803	156.71	1.597956	44.36218	5.7	1.4 km	2014/02/21	MPC; JPL

=== 2013 ===
Comet designation	Name/ discoverer(s)	Period (years)	e	a (AU)	q (AU)	i (°)	Abs. mag (M1)	Nucleus radii	Perihelion date	Ref
C/2013 E2	Iwamoto	3558	0.993936	233.07	1.413322	21.85771	10.6		2013/03/09	MPC; JPL
C/2013 F2	Catalina	770000	0.99926	8400	6.21785	61.74927	7.1		2013/04/19	MPC; JPL
C/2013 F3	McNaught	20900	0.99703	759	2.252612	85.4445	12.3		2013/05/25	MPC; JPL
C/2013 G5	Catalina	140000	0.99965	2700	0.92894	40.617	14.5		2013/09/01	MPC; JPL
C/2013 G6	Lemmon	7620	0.994708	387.1	2.048499	124.08435	6.8		2013/07/25	MPC; JPL
C/2013 G7	McNaught	102200	0.99786	2190	4.677404	105.11012	6.2		2014/03/18	MPC; JPL
C/2013 G8	PanSTARRS	193000	0.99846	3340	5.14118	27.61506	8.4		2013/11/14	MPC; JPL
C/2013 H1	La Sagra	2445	0.98542	181.5	2.64696	27.0895	6.2		2013/05/19	MPC; JPL
C/2013 J3	McNaught	86000	0.99795	1950	3.98869	118.2255	5.8		2013/02/22	MPC; JPL
C/2013 J5	Boattini	too uncertain to determine	0.999	10000	4.9049	136.011	10.0		2012/11/29	MPC; JPL
C/2013 O3	McNaught	23400	0.99612	819	3.18010	102.83974	11.1		2013/09/09	MPC; JPL
C/2013 P2	PanSTARRS	132000	0.998904	2590	2.834925	125.53216	11.8		2014/02/17	MPC; JPL
C/2013 R1	Lovejoy	11702	0.9984250	515.4	0.81182562	64.04094	11.6	1.266 km	2013/12/22	MPC; JPL
C/2013 TW_{5}	Spacewatch	9570	0.98707	450.8	5.83064	31.40046	6.7		2014/08/17	MPC; JPL
C/2013 U2	Holvorcem	26590	0.99426	891	5.116745	43.09366	5.3		2014/10/25	MPC; JPL
C/2013 V5	Oukaimeden	10784	0.9987183	488.1	0.6255811	154.88544	10.8	8.29 km	2014/09/28	MPC; JPL
C/2013 Y2	PanSTARRS	3262	0.991275	219.9	1.919086	29.41474	9.7	4.655 km	2014/06/13	MPC; JPL

=== 2014 ===
Comet designation	Name/ discoverer(s)	Period (years)	e	a (AU)	q (AU)	i (°)	Abs. mag (M1)	Nucleus radii	Perihelion date	Ref
C/2014 A5	PanSTARRS	1879	0.96848	152.3	4.79991	31.9046	11.6		2014/08/14	MPC; JPL
C/2014 C3	NEOWISE	1129	0.98283	108.4	1.86203	151.7843	12.0	2.54 km	2014/01/16	MPC; JPL
C/2014 E2	Jacques	18060	0.999035	688	0.6639172	156.392752	10.4	1.09 km	2014/07/02	MPC; JPL
C/2014 F1	Hill	210000	0.9990	3600	3.49638	108.2529	10.4		2013/10/04	MPC; JPL
C/2014 F2	Tenagra	1804	0.97089	148.20	4.314460	119.06119	5.6		2015/01/02	MPC; JPL
C/2014 G1	PanSTARRS	30000	0.9943	1000	5.4685	165.6403	6.0	47.88 km	2013/11/06	MPC; JPL
C/2014 H1	Christensen	1700	0.9849	141	2.1389	99.936	14.8		2014/04/15	MPC; JPL
C/2014 M2	Christensen	30500	0.99293	980	6.9085	32.4062	7.9		2014/07/18	MPC; JPL
C/2014 M3	Catalina	1630	0.9824	138	2.43428	164.90964	12.9		2014/06/21	MPC; JPL
C/2014 N2	PanSTARRS	330000	0.99954	4700	2.184401	133.0132	12.0		2014/10/08	MPC; JPL
C/2014 N3	NEOWISE	442000	0.999331	5800	3.882231	61.63825	4.7	15 km	2015/03/13	MPC; JPL
C/2014 OE_{4}	PanSTARRS	2957246.18	0.99969	20602.48	6.2444	81.3473	7.6		2016/12/10	MPC; JPL
C/2014 Q1	PanSTARRS	38000	0.999721	1129	0.314570	43.10685	9.8	0.8 km	2015/07/06	MPC; JPL
C/2014 Q2	Lovejoy	13946	0.9977728	579.4	1.2903578	80.301302	7.9	4.314 km	2015/01/30	MPC; JPL
C/2014 Q6	PanSTARRS	too uncertain to determine	0.999386	6883	4.222	49.7968	6.5		2015/01/06	MPC; JPL
C/2014 QU_{2}	PanSTARRS	4100	0.9913	260	2.2233	124.818	13.3		2014/07/09	MPC; JPL
C/2014 R1	Borisov	2403	0.992501	179.4	1.345431	9.93289	9.8	6.025 km	2014/11/19	MPC; JPL
C/2014 R3	PanSTARRS	1734251.91	0.9995	14434.53	7.2756	90.84	6.3		2016/08/08	MPC; JPL
C/2014 R4	Gibbs	180000	0.99943	3200	1.81797	42.4116	8.7	1.47 km	2014/10/21	MPC; JPL
C/2014 S2	PanSTARRS	2210.9	0.987622	169.71	2.100644	64.67037	5.0	1.3 km	2015/12/09	MPC; JPL
C/2014 U3	Kowalski	40000	0.9976	1100	2.5588	152.9921	12.4		2014/09/03	MPC; JPL
C/2014 UN271	Bernardinelli–Bernstein	306990	0.99759	4551	10.931	95.482	5.7	68.5 km	2031/01/29	MPC; JPL
C/2014 W2	PanSTARRS	64570	0.998341	1610	2.6702156	81.998347	7.9	21.38 km	2016/03/10	MPC; JPL
C/2014 W8	PanSTARRS	2305.52	0.9711	174.518	5.044	42.111	10.5		2015/09/08	MPC; JPL
C/2014 XB_{8}	PanSTARRS	27100	0.99666	902	3.01028	149.7827	6.8		2015/04/05	MPC; JPL

=== 2015 ===
Comet designation	Name/ discoverer(s)	Period (years)	e	a (AU)	q (AU)	i (°)	Abs. mag (M1)	Nucleus radii	Perihelion date	Ref
C/2015 C2	SWAN	10200	0.99849	471	0.711372	94.5013	14.9		2015/03/04	MPC; JPL
C/2015 ER61	PanSTARRS	57200	0.999295	1484	1.046217	6.25965	7.9	1.3 km	2017/05/09	MPC; JPL
C/2015 F3	SWAN	3530	0.99640	232	0.83444	73.3865	14.2		2015/03/09	MPC; JPL
C/2015 F4	Jacques	1255.3	0.985873	116.37	1.6439255	48.70495	11.4	1.205 km	2015/08/10	MPC; JPL
C/2015 J2	PanSTARRS	3880	0.98250	246.9	4.32039	17.28183	10.1		2015/09/08	MPC; JPL
C/2015 K1	MASTER	2426	0.98584	180.6	2.55749	29.3817	9.1	10.985 km	2014/10/13	MPC; JPL
C/2015 K2	PanSTARRS	4200	0.9944	260	1.45527	29.110	20.7		2015/06/08	MPC; JPL
C/2015 M1	PanSTARRS	8000	0.9946	390	2.0916	57.310	15.9		2015/05/15	MPC; JPL
C/2015 M3	PanSTARRS	1533	0.97328	133.0	3.55241	65.95107	11.5		2015/08/26	MPC; JPL
C/2015 O1	PanSTARRS	too uncertain to determine	0.999994	651202.3	3.7296	127.211	7.2	31.37 km	2018/02/19	MPC; JPL
C/2015 R3	PanSTARRS	190000	0.9985	3400	4.9033	83.6135	5.0		2014/02/11	MPC; JPL
C/2015 TQ_{209}	LINEAR	58000	0.99906	1500	1.41314	11.3925	10.8		2016/08/27	MPC; JPL
C/2015 V3	PanSTARRS	23600	0.99485	822	4.23569	86.2318	6.3	43.105 km	2015/11/24	MPC; JPL
C/2015 WZ	PanSTARRS	2685	0.992873	193.16	1.3766377	134.13494	10.5	2.675 km	2016/04/15	MPC; JPL
C/2015 Y1	LINEAR	5000	0.99141	292.5	2.514080	71.2196	6.7	5.98 km	2016/05/15	MPC; JPL

=== 2016 ===
Comet designation	Name/ discoverer(s)	Period (years)	e	a (AU)	q (AU)	i (°)	Abs. mag (M1)	Nucleus radii	Perihelion date	Ref
C/2016 A5	PanSTARRS	43000	0.9976	1200	2.9469	40.319	12.8		2015/06/28	MPC; JPL
C/2016 A6	PanSTARRS	3208.44	0.9889	217.53	2.4124	120.92	7.8		2015/11/05	MPC; JPL
C/2016 B1	NEOWISE	9700	0.99293	453	3.20625	50.4644	5.9	43.93 km	2016/12/04	MPC; JPL
C/2016 E2	Kowalski	1636.74	0.992	138.88	1.074	135.95	19.5		2016/02/06	MPC; JPL
C/2016 J2	Denneau	too uncertain to determine	0.998	700	1.5184	130.343	15.3	0.43 km	2016/04/11	MPC; JPL
C/2016 KA	Catalina	400000	0.9990	6000	5.4009	104.6293	8.8		2016/02/01	MPC; JPL
C/2016 M1	PanSTARRS	74000	0.99875	1760	2.21103	90.99839	8.1	6.79 km	2018/08/10	MPC; JPL
C/2016 N4	MASTER	387525	0.99940	5315.30	3.19912	72.5573	11.1	17.665 km	2017/09/16	MPC; JPL
C/2016 N6	PanSTARRS	67000	0.9984	1600	2.6699	105.8345	5.0	20.17 km	2018/07/18	MPC; JPL
C/2016 P4	PanSTARRS	5900	0.9819	330	5.888	29.89	10.7		2016/10/16	MPC; JPL
C/2016 Q2	PanSTARRS	404254.11	0.9987	5467.19	7.087	109.409	8.3		2021/05/10	MPC; JPL
C/2016 R2	PanSTARRS	22000	0.9967	780	2.6020	58.2134	5.1	17.0 km	2018/05/09	MPC; JPL
C/2016 T1	Matheny	1415.98	0.9818	126.10	2.3000	126.095	12.1		2017/02/01	MPC; JPL
C/2016 T2	Matheny	1026.30	0.98125	101.74	1.9078	81.311	13.8	1.33 km	2016/12/29	MPC; JPL
C/2016 T3	PanSTARRS	1730	0.9816	144	2.6496	22.6727	8.1	8.53 km	2017/09/06	MPC; JPL
C/2016 VZ_{18}	PanSTARRS	2700	0.99531	194.0	0.910285	24.0354	18.7	0.47 km	2017/03/07	MPC; JPL

=== 2017 ===
Comet designation	Name/ discoverer(s)	Period (years)	e	a (AU)	q (AU)	i (°)	Abs. mag (M1)	Nucleus radii	Perihelion date	Ref
C/2017 AB_{5}	PanSTARRS	37295204.74	0.99992	111625.443	9.2164	32.431	11.2		2018/02/17	MPC; JPL
C/2017 D2	Barros	51000	0.9982	1369.820	2.48587	31.26579	11.1	6.91 km	2017/07/14	MPC; JPL
C/2017 D5	PanSTARRS	1200	0.9806	112.2883	2.1672	131.03858	14.6		2017/01/08	MPC; JPL
C/2017 E4	Lovejoy	10000	0.9989	477.669	0.49357	88.1867	15.6	0.4 km	2017/04/23	MPC; JPL
C/2017 E5	Lemmon	7600	0.9954	388.6996	1.7829	122.6377	12.0	1.785 km	2016/06/10	MPC; JPL
C/2017 G3	PanSTARRS	4900	0.99098	287.3256	2.59048	159.051	14.2		2017/04/15	MPC; JPL
C/2017 K6	Jacques	34000	0.99810	1054.174	2.00279	57.2511	10.7	6.98 km	2018/01/03	MPC; JPL
C/2017 M3	PanSTARRS	2292	0.9732	173.8170	4.6561	77.5073	6.2		2017/04/28	MPC; JPL
C/2017 O1	ASASSN	9200	0.99658	439.1911	1.4987	39.849	10.4	0.919 km	2017/10/14	MPC; JPL
C/2017 P2	PanSTARRS	42100	0.997967	1210	2.461777	50.08486	9.2		2017/12/06	MPC; JPL
C/2017 T2	PanSTARRS	354300	0.99968	5007	1.6151	57.231	10.2	0.7 km	2020/05/05	MPC; JPL
C/2017 T3	ATLAS	49280	0.99939	1344	0.82522	88.10362	11.1		2018/07/19	MPC; JPL
C/2017 U2	Fuls	too uncertain to determine	0.99921	8555.39	6.700	95.4291	8.8		2017/08/28	MPC; JPL
C/2017 Y1	PanSTARRS	234400	0.99902	3791	3.719	55.2287	9.3		2017/08/31	MPC; JPL
C/2017 Y2	PanSTARRS	too uncertain to determine	0.99841	2502.89	3.957	124.67	8.0		2020/08/19	MPC; JPL

=== 2018 ===
Comet designation	Name/ discoverer(s)	Period (years)	e	a (AU)	q (AU)	i (°)	Abs. mag (M1)	Nucleus radii	Perihelion date	Ref
C/2018 A3	ATLAS	10773	0.99328	487.788	3.277	139.56	9.2	19.085 km	2019/01/12	MPC; JPL
C/2018 E2	Barros	74439	0.99778	1769.556	3.92	97.7428	6.4		2017/12/23	MPC; JPL
C/2018 EF_{9}	Lemmon	16221.08	0.99757	640.788	1.55663	84.694	18.2		2018/05/23	MPC; JPL
C/2018 F1	Grauer	5789.36	0.9907	322.415	2.993	46.0706	13.7		2018/12/14	MPC; JPL
C/2018 KJ_{3}	Lemmon	24084.39	0.99565	833.97	3.627	136.66655	12.2		2019/09/10	MPC; JPL
C/2018 L2	ATLAS	3879	0.9931	246.853	1.712	67.4235	8.1		2018/12/02	MPC; JPL
C/2018 N1	NEOWISE	8668	0.9981	693.83	1.307	159.44	15.0	0.27 km	2018/08/01	MPC; JPL
C/2018 R3	Lemmon	87446.17	0.99934	1970.10	1.29	69.7154	11.3		2019/06/07	MPC; JPL
C/2018 R4	Fuls	5494	0.99451	311.353	1.7093	11.68371	11.8		2018/03/03	MPC; JPL
C/2018 V4	Africano	3131.89	0.98506	214.059	3.19901	69.0028	15.7		2019/03/01	MPC; JPL
C/2018 X2	Fitzsimmons	1947.93	0.9864	155.971	2.125	23.06	6.4		2019/07/08	MPC; JPL
C/2018 Y1	Iwamoto	1149.57	0.988	109.736	1.287	160.4	12.3		2019/02/07	MPC; JPL

=== 2019 ===
Comet designation	Name/ discoverer(s)	Period (years)	e	a (AU)	q (AU)	i (°)	Abs. mag (M1)	Nucleus radii	Perihelion date	Ref
C/2019 B1	Africano	1873.55	0.9895	151.97	1.597	123.36	14.6	1.2 km	2019/03/19	MPC; JPL
C/2019 D1	Flewelling	1615.12	0.989	137.6571	1.5775	34.098	11.8	1.96 km	2019/05/11	MPC; JPL
C/2019 G2	PanSTARRS	18514	0.9967	699.8	2.291	159.21	16.31		2019/12/10	MPC; JPL
C/2019 H1	NEOWISE	3506.07	0.99201	230.7855	1.8448	104.579	13.5	2.325 km	2019/04/27	MPC; JPL
C/2019 J2	Palomar	20231	0.99767	742.46	1.727	105.136	9.4	0.4 km	2019/07/19	MPC; JPL
C/2019 JU_{6}	ATLAS	too uncertain to determine	0.99939	3394	2.045	148.2917	14.5	2.305 km	2019/06/01	MPC; JPL
C/2019 K4	Ye	115449.93	0.9990	2370.96	2.2594	105.31	12.8	4.75 km	2019/06/16	MPC; JPL
C/2019 K5	Young	1855.41	0.9865	150.99	2.035	15.315	12.3	5.46 km	2019/06/22	MPC; JPL
C/2019 K8	ATLAS	52828	0.998	1440.4914	3.195	93.222	11.3		2019/07/21	MPC; JPL
C/2019 N1	ATLAS	1512447	0.99987	13156.57	1.7047	82.424	9.0	22.12 km	2020/12/01	MPC; JPL
C/2019 T3	ATLAS	177405	0.99812	3157.2	5.9465	121.86	6.2		2021/03/02	MPC; JPL
C/2019 T4	ATLAS	31983.74	0.9958	1007.58	4.245	53.62	5.6	48.635 km	2022/06/09	MPC; JPL
C/2019 U6	Lemmon	9084.03	0.9979	435.36	0.914	61.0049	13.3	2.06 km	2020/06/18	MPC; JPL
C/2019 V1	Borisov	178731	0.99902	3173	3.097	61.8671	14.5		2020/07/16	MPC; JPL
C/2019 Y1	ATLAS	3513.22	0.9964	231.099	0.8378	73.347	12.4	0.6 km	2020/03/15	MPC; JPL
C/2019 Y4	ATLAS	6025.89	0.9992	331.14	0.253	45.380	7.9	0.3 km	2020/05/31	MPC; JPL
C/2019 Y4-B	ATLAS	17185	0.99962	665.948	0.2525	45.454	15.8		2020/05/31	MPC; JPL

=== 2020 ===
Comet designation	Name/ discoverer(s)	Period (years)	e	a (AU)	q (AU)	i (°)	Abs. mag (M1)	Nucleus radii	Perihelion date	Ref
C/2020 A2	Iwamoto	35002.27	0.9991	1070.02	0.978	120.75	15.0		2020/01/08	MPC; JPL
C/2020 A3	ATLAS	380974	0.9991	6807.33	5.767	146.7	7.7		2019/06/29	MPC; JPL
C/2020 B3	Rankin	84101.96	0.99826	1919.5	3.3446	20.703	14.5		2019/10/19	MPC; JPL
C/2020 F3	NEOWISE	7329.46	0.9992	377.32	0.295	128.937	12.3	2.5 km	2020/07/03	MPC; JPL
C/2020 F6	PanSTARRS	8159.58	0.99134	405.3	3.511	174.58	13.2		2020/04/11	MPC; JPL
C/2020 F8	SWAN	too uncertain to determine	0.99994	6642.61	0.430	110.80	11.6	0.3 km	2020/05/27	MPC; JPL
C/2020 H2	Pruyne	2487.72	0.9955	183.596	0.834	125.04	19.8		2020/04/27	MPC; JPL
C/2020 H4	Leonard	1665.00	0.9933	140.477	0.9383	84.320	16.5		2020/08/29	MPC; JPL
C/2020 H5	Robinson	200572	0.9963	2497.44	9.3500	70.204	4.5		2020/12/05	MPC; JPL
C/2020 H7	Lemmon	56742.20	0.997	1476.6	4.42	135.92	11.1		2020/06/02	MPC; JPL
C/2020 H8	PanSTARRS	14510	0.99214	594.908	4.6744	99.65	10.4		2020/06/04	MPC; JPL
C/2020 H11	PanSTARRS–Lemmon	1070000	0.99927	10470	7.631	151.41	7.4		2020/09/15	MPC; JPL
C/2020 J1	SONEAR	too uncertain to determine	0.9996	9376.42	3.356	142.305	7.2	33.68 km	2021/04/18	MPC; JPL
C/2020 K1	PanSTARRS	too uncertain to determine	0.99902	3141.03	3.078	89.646	5.6	25.94 km	2023/05/09	MPC; JPL
C/2020 K2	PanSTARRS	too uncertain to determine	0.99894	8380.85	8.8762	91.0288	6.1		2020/08/05	MPC; JPL
C/2020 K3	Leonard	3053.03	0.9924	210.450	1.593	128.72	14.8	0.48 km	2020/05/30	MPC; JPL
C/2020 K6	Rankin	too uncertain to determine	0.998	2876.55	5.8844	103.619	8.1		2021/09/11	MPC; JPL
C/2020 K7	PanSTARRS	1128.70	0.9411	108.4	6.3847	32.059	7.9		2019/10/30	MPC; JPL
C/2020 M5	ATLAS	346814.64	0.9994	4936.2	3.005	93.223	6.9	12.6 km	2021/08/19	MPC; JPL
C/2020 N2	ATLAS	1134.00	0.9835	108.74	1.746	161.034	15.6		2020/08/23	MPC; JPL
C/2020 P3	ATLAS	too uncertain to determine	0.9986	4910.32	6.812	61.89	6.7		2021/04/20	MPC; JPL
C/2020 R2	ATLAS	7950.15	0.9882	398.332	4.693	53.22	7.1		2022/02/24	MPC; JPL
C/2020 R6	Rankin	8054	0.9931	451.023	3.129	82.83	7.4		2019/09/10	MPC; JPL
C/2020 R7	ATLAS	too uncertain to determine	0.99953	6397.95	2.957	114.893	10.7	23.36 km	2022/09/16	MPC; JPL
C/2020 S3	Erasmus	2577.50	0.99788	187.987	0.3985	19.861	13.0	1.0 km	2020/12/12	MPC; JPL
C/2020 S4	PanSTARRS	too uncertain to determine	0.99932	4962.260	3.3673	20.5750	7.4	8.335 km	2023/02/09	MPC; JPL
C/2020 S8	PanSTARRS	4468.01	0.99129	271.2715	2.3639	108.517	8.1	4.405 km	2021/04/10	MPC; JPL
C/2020 T2	Palomar	5814.24	0.99364	323.34	2.055	27.873	8.8	5.525 km	2021/07/11	MPC; JPL
C/2020 T5	Lemmon	28398.06	0.99797	930.79	1.889	66.604	16.2		2020/10/09	MPC; JPL
C/2020 U5	Lemmon	442997	0.99995	79736.84	3.756	97.280	9.7		2022/04/27	MPC; JPL
C/2020 Y2	ATLAS	42502.95	0.99743	1217.888	3.132	101.281	6.4	8.15 km	2022/06/17	MPC; JPL
C/2020 Y3	ATLAS	1858.91	0.98678	151.18	1.999	83.097	14.6	3.245 km	2020/12/03	MPC; JPL

=== 2021 ===
Comet designation	Name/ discoverer(s)	Period (years)	e	a (AU)	q (AU)	i (°)	Abs. mag (M1)	Nucleus radii	Perihelion date	Ref
C/2021 A2	NEOWISE	4126.29	0.9945	257.26	1.413	106.978	14.7	3.5 km	2021/01/22	MPC; JPL
C/2021 A6	PanSTARRS	1046772	0.99933	11846.50	7.929	75.605	7.1		2021/05/05	MPC; JPL
C/2021 A7	NEOWISE	597792	0.99964	5448.01	1.968	78.149	13.5	6.725 km	2021/07/15	MPC; JPL
C/2021 B2	PanSTARRS	6159.5	0.99252	336.015	2.513	38.094	4.8		2021/07/15	MPC; JPL
C/2021 C1	Rankin	866367	0.99957	8030.77	3.481	143.04	8.8		2020/12/07	MPC; JPL
C/2021 C4	ATLAS	419964	0.99903	4645.31	4.504	132.84	6.9		2021/01/17	MPC; JPL
C/2021 C5	ATLAS	293737	0.99977	14042.0	3.241	50.787	12.0		2023/02/10	MPC; JPL
C/2021 G2	ATLAS	too uncertain to determine	0.99876	4011.4	4.976	48.478	5.7	47.685 km	2024/09/10	MPC; JPL
C/2021 N3	PanSTARRS	1990.4	0.9640	158.23	5.701	26.74	7.1		2020/08/17	MPC; JPL
C/2021 P2	PanSTARRS	123063	0.9977	2211.11	5.072	150.02	5.4		2023/01/21	MPC; JPL
C/2021 P4	ATLAS	5338.32	0.9965	305.44	1.080	56.31	8.7		2022/07/30	MPC; JPL
C/2021 Q6	PanSTARRS	too uncertain to determine	0.9992	10932	8.716	161.85	6.9		2024/03/21	MPC; JPL
C/2021 R2	PanSTARRS	156947	0.9968	2265.45	7.312	134.46	7.7		2021/12/25	MPC; JPL
C/2021 R7	PanSTARRS	40167	0.9952	1173	5.641	158.85	7.7		2021/04/14	MPC; JPL
C/2021 S4	Tsuchinshan (*CTC)	2035.2	0.9583	161.91	6.694	17.478	7.0		2023/12/31	MPC; JPL
C/2021 T1	Lemmon	56007.2	0.9979	1463.83	3.058	140.35	5.7		2021/10/14	MPC; JPL
C/2021 U5	Catalina	3193.50	0.9891	216.86	2.363	39.05	6.9	5.29 km	2022/01/26	MPC; JPL
C/2021 V1	Rankin	17709.00	0.9956	679.40	3.014	71.441	15.9		2022/04/30	MPC; JPL

=== 2022 ===
Comet designation	Name/ discoverer(s)	Period (years)	e	a (AU)	q (AU)	i (°)	Abs. mag (M1)	Nucleus radii	Perihelion date	Ref
C/2022 A1	Sarneczky	8347	0.9970	411.49	1.253	116.51	19.2		2022/01/31	MPC; JPL
C/2022 A3	Lemmon–ATLAS	31921.61	0.9963	1006.28	3.703	88.360	5.3	24.03 km	2023/09/28	MPC; JPL
C/2022 B4	Bok	7489	0.9964	382.80	1.380	20.043	21.7		2022/01/29	MPC; JPL
C/2022 D2	Kowalski	6720	0.9956	356.11	1.555	22.655	14.1		2022/03/27	MPC; JPL
C/2022 H1	Kowalski	40472	0.9934	1158.59	7.693	49.870	6.3		2024/01/18	MPC; JPL
C/2022 L1	Catalina	12150	0.9970	528.47	1.591	123.468	13.3	2.175 km	2022/09/28	MPC; JPL
C/2022 L4	PanSTARRS	4052	0.9881	254.18	3.015	141.224	16.6		2021/12/08	MPC; JPL
C/2022 P3	ZTF	3808	0.9894	243.88	2.561	59.519	14.5	7.52 km	2022/07/27	MPC; JPL
C/2022 R2	ATLAS	8697	0.9985	422.92	0.633	52.895	16.6		2022/10/25	MPC; JPL
C/2022 T1	Lemmon	318000	0.9993	4655	3.444	22.543	5.1		2024/02/17	MPC; JPL
C/2022 U1	Leonard	537794	0.99983	24370	4.203	128.142	10.3		2024/03/25	MPC; JPL
C/2022 U4	Bok	222800	0.9992	3727	2.898	52.038	9.7		2023/08/03	MPC; JPL
C/2022 W2	ATLAS	6050	0.9906	332.03	3.123	63.533	14.1		2023/03/08	MPC; JPL
C/2022 W3	Leonard	4707	0.9950	280.85	1.398	103.560	14.0	1.53 km	2023/06/22	MPC; JPL

=== 2023 ===
Comet designation	Name/ discoverer(s)	Period (years)	e	a (AU)	q (AU)	i (°)	Abs. mag (M1)	Nucleus radii	Perihelion date	Ref
C/2023 A1	Leonard	3470	0.9920	229.28	1.835	94.743	6.2	2.62 km	2023/03/18	MPC; JPL
C/2023 A2	SWAN	13060	0.9983	554.6	0.947	94.708	12.5		2023/01/20	MPC; JPL
C/2023 B2	ATLAS	14920	0.9971	606.07	1.743	40.771	5.8		2023/03/10	MPC; JPL
C/2023 C2	ATLAS	220350	0.99935	3648	2.368	48.317	11.4	27.45 km	2024/11/16	MPC; JPL
C/2023 F1	PanSTARRS	4290	0.9935	2264.0	1.708	131.752	10.1	0.625 km	2023/06/08	MPC; JPL
C/2023 H1	PanSTARRS	20814	0.9974	1719	4.44	21.777	8.7		2024/11/28	MPC; JPL
C/2023 H2	Lemmon	3734	0.9963	240.7	0.894	113.75	10.0		2023/10/29	MPC; JPL
C/2023 K1	ATLAS	17000	0.9969	662	2.093	138.00	6.9	5.345 km	2023/09/07	MPC; JPL
C/2023 Q2	PanSTARRS	6155	0.9904	335.9	3.209	104.05	10.8		2024/06/24	MPC; JPL
C/2023 S2	ATLAS	1835	0.9929	149.89	1.068	20.485	14.5		2023/10/15	MPC; JPL
C/2023 T2	Borisov	3543	0.9914	232.42	1.995	48.597	11.3		2023/12/22	MPC; JPL
C/2023 T3	Fuls	16692	0.9946	653.15	3.549	27.222	6.7		2025/01/25	MPC; JPL
C/2023 U1	Fuls	107349	0.9967	1502.5	4.974	108.145	8.0		2024/10/12	MPC; JPL
C/2023 V1	Lemmon	too uncertain to determine	0.99925	6822.73	5.094	102.01	7.4		2025/07/13	MPC; JPL
C/2023 X1	Leonard	2071	0.99415	162.51	0.950	110.59	17.4	0.675 km	2023/10/18	MPC; JPL

=== 2024 ===
Comet designation	Name/ discoverer(s)	Period (years)	e	a (AU)	q (AU)	i (°)	Abs. mag (M1)	Nucleus radii	Perihelion date	Ref
C/2024 B2	Lemmon	435491	0.99939	6630	4.077	99.84	7.5		2023/10/06	MPC; JPL
C/2024 D1	Lemmon	503620	0.99894	6329	6.696	132.46	6.1		2027/12/03	MPC; JPL
C/2024 G1	Wierzchos	1326	0.96744	120.7	3.930	95.40	14.1		2024/10/21	MPC; JPL
C/2024 G2	ATLAS	12310	0.98997	533	5.349	122.14	7.2		2025/06/13	MPC; JPL
C/2024 G4	PanSTARRS	197200	0.99855	3388	4.898	33.03	12.8		2026/03/21	MPC; JPL
C/2024 G5	Leonard	12205	0.99443	530	2.953	50.39	10.7		2024/09/06	MPC; JPL
C/2024 J2	Wierzchoś	1837	0.98793	150	1.811	79.30	8.0	20.215 km	2025/03/19	MPC; JPL
C/2024 J4	Lemmon	213700	0.99841	3574	5.695	117.54	7.2		2025/04/26	MPC; JPL
C/2024 L2	PanSTARRS	too uncertain to determine	0.98164	453.56	8.326	139.49	5.8		2025/06/13	MPC; JPL
C/2024 U1	PanSTARRS	22300	0.9939	791.2	4.836	128.71	7.4		2024/06/30	MPC; JPL
C/2024 V1	Borisov	3620	0.9902	235.6	2.318	54.62	13.2		2025/04/04	MPC; JPL

=== 2025 ===
Comet designation	Name/ discoverer(s)	Period (years)	e	a (AU)	q (AU)	i (°)	Abs. mag (M1)	Nucleus radii	Perihelion date	Ref
C/2025 A6	Lemmon	1390	0.9958	124.7	0.529	143.63	13.8		2025/11/08	MPC; JPL
C/2025 B2	Borisov	1140000	0.9992	10920	8.247	91.75	6.0		2026/09/09	MPC; JPL
C/2025 D5	PanSTARRS	184000	0.9994	3234	2.012	73.38	19.3		2025/05/13	MPC; JPL
C/2025 D6	ATLAS	43333	0.99797	1234	2.504	145.79	12.6		2024/12/11	MPC; JPL
C/2025 E1	PanSTARRS	51458	0.9971	1383	3.998	69.07	7.0		2026/09/23	MPC; JPL
C/2025 F1	ATLAS	4913	0.9962	289	1.070	109.24	15.8		2025/04/20	MPC; JPL
C/2025 J1	Borisov	36987	0.9968	1110	3.581	95.445	6.9		2026/06/11	MPC; JPL
C/2025 L2	MAPS	11961	0.9946	523	2.834	86.583	11.7		2025/12/20	MPC; JPL
C/2025 M1	PanSTARRS	too uncertain to determine	0.9985	7358	10.82	64.906	6.7		2029/08/03	MPC; JPL
C/2025 O2	MAPS	too uncertain to determine	0.99834	1380	2.288	134.54	5.3		2025/05/23	MPC; JPL
C/2025 Q1	ATLAS	39051	0.99123	1151	10.1	66.15	6.7		2024/07/12	MPC; JPL
C/2025 Q3	ATLAS	20220	0.99715	742.21	2.113	90.188	13.1		2026/02/25	MPC; JPL
C/2025 R1	ATLAS	2163	0.98819	167.29	1.975	110.03	14.4		2025/11/23	MPC; JPL
C/2025 T1	ATLAS	too uncertain to determine	0.99595	273.30	1.108	123.47	14.7		2025/12/02	MPC; JPL
C/2025 W1	Sankovich	too uncertain to determine	0.99968	12974	4.171	79.804	9.4		2025/02/17	MPC; JPL
C/2025 Y1	ATLAS	too uncertain to determine	0.99966	7701	2.601	14.558	6.6		2027/10/13	MPC; JPL

=== 2026 ===
Comet designation	Name/ discoverer(s)	Period (years)	e	a (AU)	q (AU)	i (°)	Abs. mag (M1)	Nucleus radii	Perihelion date	Ref
C/2026 A1	MAPS	1158	0.99995	110.29	0.005	144.51	14.6	0.2 km	2026/04/04	MPC; JPL
C/2026 A2	Bok	21574	0.99749	774.97	1.937	82.307	6.6		2026/12/22	MPC; JPL
C/2026 B3	PanSTARRS	37876	0.99484	1127	5.816	100.83	7.0		2027/05/05	MPC; JPL
C/2026 B4	SWAN	8291	0.99923	409.6	0.396	80.69	17.4		2026/01/28	MPC; JPL
C/2026 C1	Tsuchinshan	too uncertain to determine	0.99991	12556	1.152	99.595	6.2		2028/11/06	MPC; JPL
C/2026 L1	PanSTARRS	20473	0.99354	754.93	4.88	67.26	9.0		2027/04/11	MPC; JPL
C/2026 N1	PanSTARRS	too uncertain to determine	0.99949	10246	5.212	86.077	7.0		2028/01/30	MPC; JPL
C/2026 P2	PanSTARRS	too uncertain to determine	0.99985	16816	2.480	63.013	6.0		2027/11/21	MPC; JPL
C/2026 P3	SWAN	1411	0.99742	125.83	0.325	109.0	14.4		2026/09/03	MPC; JPL
C/2026 P4	PanSTARRS	1515	0.97656	131.92	3.092	174.14	14.5		2026/06/11	MPC; JPL
C/2026 S1	Euclid	too uncertain to determine	0.99329	1307	8.766	85.235	6.3		2027/08/29	MPC; JPL
C/2026 S2	ATLAS	3199	0.97981	217.1	4.384	158.46	8.7		2027/05/31	MPC; JPL
C/2026 V2	MAPS	2371	0.98726	177.83	2.265	123.49	14.7		2026/11/05	MPC; JPL

== See also ==
- List of comets by type
  - List of numbered comets
  - List of periodic comets
  - List of Halley-type comets
  - List of long-period comets
  - List of parabolic and hyperbolic comets
  - List of Kreutz sungrazers
  - List of comets with no meaningful orbit
