= C/2009 F6 (Yi–SWAN) =

Non-periodic comet

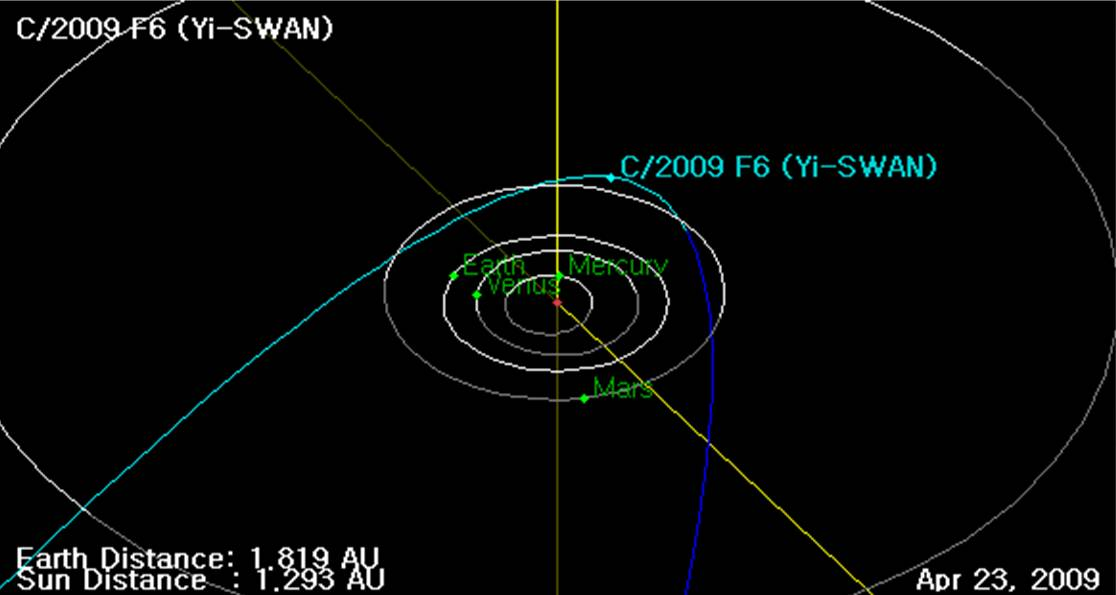

Discovery
- Discovered by: Dae-am Yi; Robert D. Matson (SWAN)
- Discovery site: SOHO
- Discovery date: 26 March 2009

Orbital characteristics
- Epoch: 22 May 2009 (JD 2454973.5)
- Observation arc: 330 days
- Earliest precovery date: 25 March 2009
- Number of observations: 487
- Aphelion: 904 AU
- Perihelion: 1.274 AU
- Semi-major axis: 453 AU
- Eccentricity: 0.99751
- Orbital period: ~9,600 years
- Inclination: 85.764°
- Longitude of ascending node: 278.68°
- Argument of periapsis: 129.77°
- Mean anomaly: 0.0012°
- Last perihelion: 8 May 2009
- T_{Jupiter}: 0.113
- Earth MOID: 0.505 AU
- Jupiter MOID: 0.724 AU

Physical characteristics
- Mean radius: 2.54 km (1.58 mi)
- Comet total magnitude (M1): 9.7
- Comet nuclear magnitude (M2): 13.2
- Apparent magnitude: 8.3 (2009 apparition)

C/2009 F6 (Yi–SWAN) is a non-periodic comet which first appeared in March 2009.

== Discovery and observations ==
On 4 April 2009, Robert D. Matson reported the discovery of a comet spotted from images taken by the SWAN instrument of the SOHO spacecraft. Around the same time, Hereupon H. Yamaoka of the University of Tokyo received an email from South Korean astronomer, Dae-am Yi, where he reported that he had discovered the comet nine days earlier on 26 March, at the time a 12th-magnitude object within the constellation Lacerta.

The comet was too dim to be seen by the naked eye, though it was observed through small telescopes. It is hard to watch because it is small with a tiny tail in the visible-light spectrum. The comet reached a peak magnitude of 8.3 on 6 April, and passed 1.5 degrees south of the Double Cluster in Perseus on 23 April. Preliminary calculations of its orbit by Brian G. Marsden indicate the comet is traveling in a highly inclined parabolic orbit, tipped 85.7° to the plane of the ecliptic. It reached perihelion on 8 May, where it came as close as 1.27 AU (190 million km) from the Sun.
