= C/1998 H1 (Stonehouse) =

Non-periodic comet

Discovery
- Discovered by: Patrick L. Stonehouse
- Discovery site: Wolverine, Michigan
- Discovery date: 22 April 1998

Orbital characteristics
- Epoch: 13 May 1998 (JD 2450946.5)
- Observation arc: 91 days
- Number of observations: 407
- Aphelion: 1,442.77 AU
- Perihelion: 1.487 AU
- Semi-major axis: 722.129 AU
- Eccentricity: 0.99794
- Orbital period: 19,405.77 years
- Inclination: 104.693°
- Longitude of ascending node: 222.109°
- Argument of periapsis: 1.325°
- Last perihelion: 14 April 1998
- T_{Jupiter}: –0.376
- Earth MOID: 0.4796 AU
- Jupiter MOID: 3.9427 AU

Physical characteristics
- Comet total magnitude (M1): 10.0
- Comet nuclear magnitude (M2): 14.5
- Apparent magnitude: 12.0

Comet Stonehouse, formally designated C/1998 H1, is a non-periodic comet discovered in April 22, 1998 by Patrick L. Stonehouse of Wolverine, Michigan, USA.

With a maximum brightness of about 12.0 in April/May 1998, Comet Stonehouse was too faint to be seen by the unaided eye, but it was a popular object for telescope-equipped comet watchers.
