= C/1960 Y1 (Candy) =

Non-periodic comet

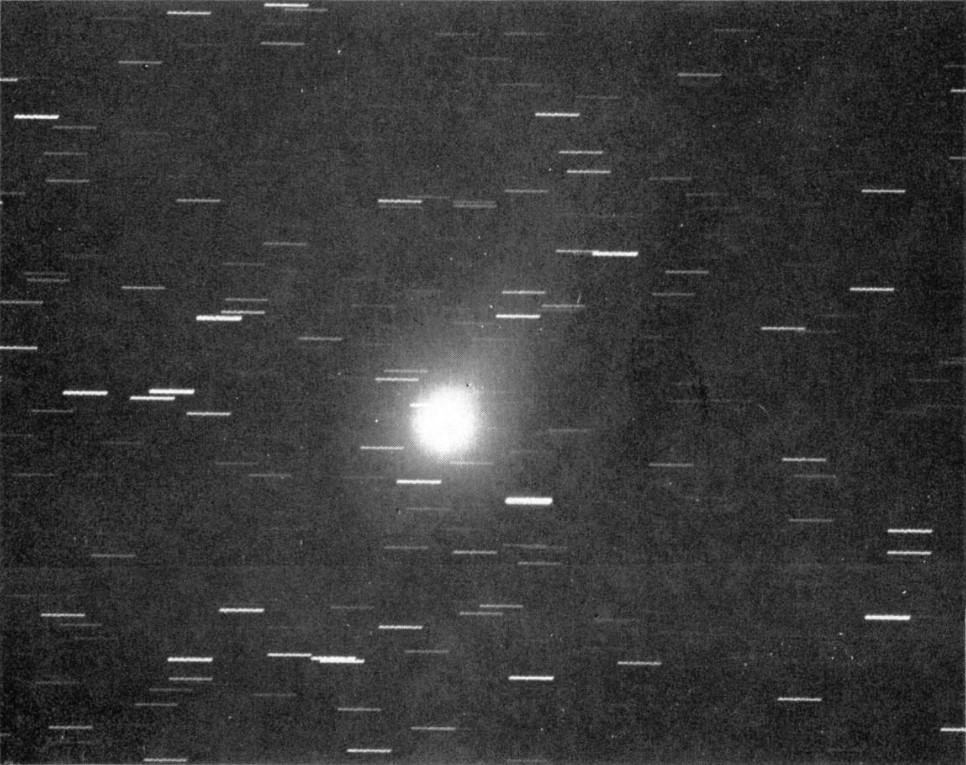
- Comet Candy photographed from the US Naval Observatory on 13 January 1961

Discovery
- Discovered by: Michael P. Candy
- Discovery date: 26 December 1960

Designations
- Alternative designations: 1960n 1961 II

Orbital characteristics
- Epoch: 9 January 1961 (JD 2437308.5)
- Observation arc: 8 days
- Earliest precovery date: 17 December 1960
- Number of observations: 8
- Aphelion: 29.004 AU
- Perihelion: 0.9899 AU
- Semi-major axis: 15.025 AU
- Eccentricity: 0.93034
- Orbital period: 932 years (inbound); 1,032 years (outbound)
- Inclination: 151.175°
- Longitude of ascending node: 177.293°
- Argument of periapsis: 138.765°
- Last perihelion: 8 February 1961
- T_{Jupiter}: –0.746
- Earth MOID: 0.1522 AU
- Jupiter MOID: 0.1628 AU

Physical characteristics
- Comet total magnitude (M1): 7.9
- Comet nuclear magnitude (M2): 16.5
- Apparent magnitude: 8.0 (1961 apparition)

Candy's Comet, also known as C/1960 Y1 by its modern nomenclature, is a non-periodic comet in retrograde orbit around the Sun. It is the first comet to have its orbit calculated by its own discoverer.

== Discovery and observations ==
The comet was first imaged unnoticed in three prediscovery images taken from the Sonneberg Observatory on 17 December, however it was not discovered until Michael Philip Candy spotted it when he was testing an eyepiece of his 5 in (13 cm) comet seeker on 26 December. At the time of discovery, it was a magnitude 8.0 object about 3 degrees southeast of the star Kappa Cephei. The subsequent two nights were clear, which helped Candy and G. E. Taylor to calculate its orbit and ephemeris right away. Precovery ephemerides of the comet showed that it should be only 5 degrees from Comet Borrelly on October 1960.

The comet made its closest approach to Earth of 26 December 1960, the day it was discovered, at a distance of 0.645 AU. The comet moved quickly southwards and faded while approaching perihelion. Observations from 13 January 1961 show a very sharp nuclear condensation of magnitude 15.0. Throughout January, the comet did not produce a discernible tail, however photometric analysis show the comet emitting an intense far-red emission of activity. A faint tail about 15–20 arcminutes long was observed in January and February. The comet throughout February was a 9th magnitude object. The comet was last detected on 14 May 1961.

== Orbit ==
An orbit calculated based on a short observation arc of only 8 days, indicated the comet as a Halley-type periodic comet with an orbit lasting 58 years. The very small minimum orbit intersection distance with Earth of 0.152 AU (22.7 million km) has led JPL to classify it as a near-Earth comet, although orbital simulations conducted by CNEOS do not show any close approaches to Earth. A revised orbit calculated by Brian G. Marsden, Zdenek Sekanina, and E. Everhart from positions obtained from 30 December 1960 to 14 May 1961 indicates that eccentricity of the comet is 0.9899, that corresponds to an orbital period of 932 years inbound and 1,057 years outbound.
