= C/1955 N1 (Bakharev–Macfarlane–Krienke) =

Non-periodic comet

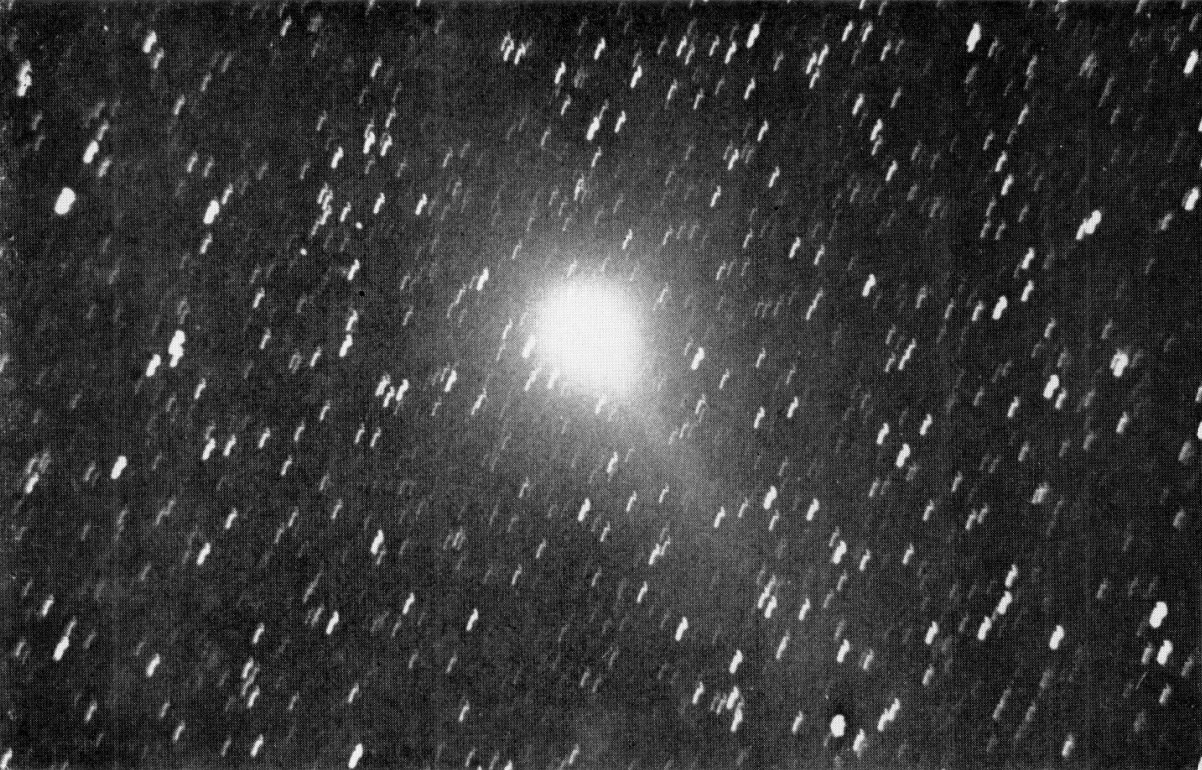
- Comet B–M–K photographed by Paolo Maffei from Italy on 25 July 1955.

Discovery
- Discovered by: Anatoly M. Bakharev; Lewis Macfarlane; Ora “Karl” Krienke, Jr.
- Discovery site: Stalinabad, Tajik SSR; Seattle, USA
- Discovery date: 13–14 July 1955

Designations
- Alternative designations: 1955 IV, 1955f

Orbital characteristics
- Epoch: 16 August 1955 (JD 2435335.5)
- Observation arc: 132 days
- Number of observations: 28
- Aphelion: ~500 AU
- Perihelion: 1.427 AU
- Semi-major axis: ~250 AU
- Eccentricity: 0.99425
- Orbital period: ~3,900 years
- Inclination: 50.034°
- Longitude of ascending node: 303.47°
- Argument of periapsis: 13.216°
- Mean anomaly: 0.009°
- Last perihelion: 11 July 1955
- T_{Jupiter}: 0.879
- Earth MOID: 0.426 AU
- Jupiter MOID: 3.195 AU

Physical characteristics
- Spectral type: (B–V) = 0.4±0.1; (U–B) = –0.52
- Comet total magnitude (M1): 4.79
- Apparent magnitude: 7.8 (1955 apparition)

Comet Bakharev–Macfarlane–Krienke, formally designated as C/1955 N1, is a non-periodic comet that was observed from July to November 1955. It was discovered independently by three astronomers, Anatoly M. Bakharev, Lewis Macfarlane and Ora “Karl” Krienke, Jr.

== Observational history ==
The comet was already on its outbound trajectory when it was first discovered by Anatoly M. Bakharev on the night of 13 July 1955. It was independently discovered by Lewis Macfarlane and Ora "Karl" Krienke, Jr about 17 hours later on 14 July 1955, where they immediately found out that their comet is the same object as Bakharev's earlier find. At the time, the comet was an 8th-magnitude object within the constellation Pegasus. (Note: Reported initial position upon discovery was: α = 22^{h} 50.7^{m} , δ = 20° 25′)

Between 17 and 22 July 1955, Kenneth M. Yoss made the first spectroscopic observations of the comet using the 24–36 inch Schmidt telescope at the University of Michigan, where he measured the gas emissions within its coma and compared it with that of 24P/Schaumasse, C/1953 T1 (Abell), and C/1955 L1 (Mrkos). Eric Mervyn Lindsay captured 14 photographic plates of the comet between 15 July and 12 August 1955. Photoelectric observations were also conducted at the Mount Wilson Observatory between 28 July and 2 August 1955, obtaining its color indices.

The comet was last seen on 25 November 1955 by Elizabeth Roemer as a 17th-magnitude object within the constellation Cepheus. (Note: Positions upon final observation was: α = 21^{h} 06.4^{m} , δ = 56° 28′) She and Hamilton Jeffers later attempted to find the comet between February and March 1956 but they failed to locate it.
