= C/2004 Q1 (Tucker) =

Non-periodic comet

Discovery
- Discovered by: Roy A. Tucker
- Discovery site: Tucson, Arizona
- Discovery date: 23 August 2004

Designations
- Alternative designations: CK04Q010

Orbital characteristics
- Epoch: 11 December 2004 (JD 2453350.5)
- Observation arc: 615 days (1.68 years)
- Earliest precovery date: 22 August 2004
- Number of observations: 1,972
- Aphelion: ~370 AU
- Perihelion: 2.047 AU
- Semi-major axis: ~190 AU
- Eccentricity: 0.98904
- Orbital period: ~2,550 years
- Inclination: 56.088°
- Longitude of ascending node: 22.130°
- Argument of periapsis: 32.968°
- Mean anomaly: 0.0015°
- Last perihelion: 6 December 2004
- T_{Jupiter}: 1.015
- Earth MOID: 1.146 AU
- Jupiter MOID: 2.582 AU

Physical characteristics
- Comet total magnitude (M1): 9.6
- Comet nuclear magnitude (M2): 11.8
- Apparent magnitude: 10.5 (2004 apparition)

Comet Tucker, formally designated as C/2004 Q1, is a faint non-periodic comet that had a very distant perihelion on 11 December 2004. It was the second of two comets discovered by famed amateur astronomer, Roy A. Tucker. (Note: Roy A. Tucker's first comet discovery was 328P/LONEOS–Tucker in 1998)

== Discovery and observations ==
Roy A. Tucker discovered the comet as a diffuse magnitude 14.6 object in the constellation Cetus on 23 August 2004, (Note: Reported initial position upon discovery was: α = 2^{h} 42^{m} 20.76^{s}, δ = 2° 08′ 54.4″) using a 0.35 m (14 in) reflector telescope. Images on 25 August show a 30" coma and a tail measuring 70" in length. Observations from Spain in the next day reported that it was 12.9 in apparent magnitude. It steadily brightened in the following months until it reached perihelion in December 2004, although it did not get any closer to the inner Solar System, resulting in a peak magnitude of 10.5.

Orbital calculations by Brian G. Marsden revealed that C/2004 Q1 might not be a "new" comet from the Oort cloud, noting its trajectory as dynamically old. It was last observed on 4 May 2005.
