= C/2012 X1 (LINEAR) =

Non-periodic comet

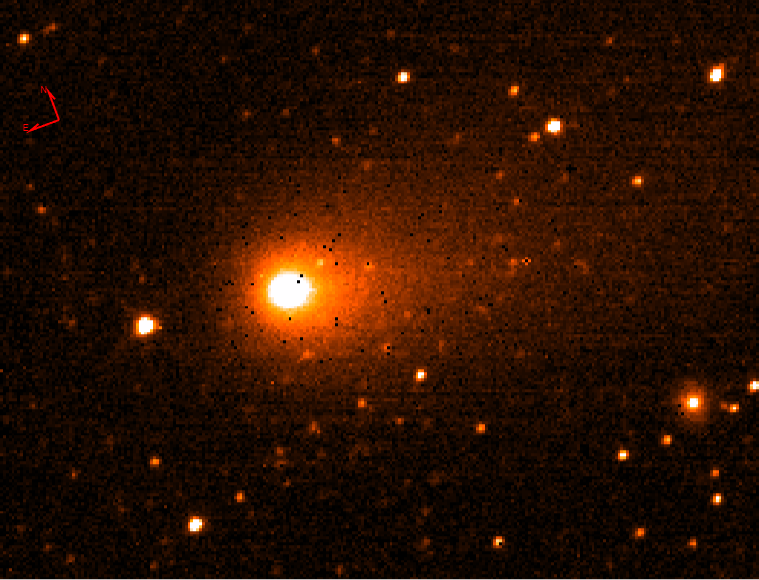
- The comet on 18 May 2014 by NEOWISE

Discovery
- Discovered by: LINEAR
- Discovery site: Socorro, New Mexico
- Discovery date: 8 December 2012

Designations
- Alternative designations: CK12X010

Orbital characteristics
- Epoch: 18 December 2013 (JD 2456644.5)
- Observation arc: 1,038 days (2.84 years)
- Aphelion: 305.1 AU
- Perihelion: 1.599 AU
- Semi-major axis: 153.33 AU
- Eccentricity: 0.98957
- Orbital period: ~1,900 years
- Max. orbital speed: 33.2 km/s
- Inclination: 44.367°
- Longitude of ascending node: 113.146°
- Argument of periapsis: 132.114°
- Last perihelion: 21 February 2014
- T_{Jupiter}: 1.152
- Earth MOID: 0.752 AU
- Jupiter MOID: 1.066 AU

Physical characteristics
- Dimensions: 1.8–3.6 km (1.1–2.2 mi)
- Mean diameter: 2.8 km (1.7 mi)
- Comet total magnitude (M1): 5.5
- Comet nuclear magnitude (M2): 10.8
- Apparent magnitude: 8.5 (2013 apparition)

Comet LINEAR, formal designation C/2012 X1, is a non-periodic comet that was observed telescopically from 2012 to 2015. It produced a powerful outburst on 21 October 2013, which raised its brightness 100 times its expected magnitude from 12 to 8.5 for several months.

== Discovery and observations ==
An asteroid-like object with an apparent magnitude of 19.4 was spotted with cometary activity from images taken by the Lincoln Near-Earth Asteroid Research survey on the night of 8 December 2012.

From April 2014 onwards, the comet slowly faded away as it made its way back to the outer Solar System. It was last observed from Australia as a 20th-magnitude object about 7.0 AU (1.05 billion km) from the Sun on 9 December 2015.
