= C/1864 O1 (Donati–Toussaint) =

Non-periodic comet

Discovery
- Discovered by: Giovanni B. Donati; Carlo Toussaint
- Discovery site: Florence, Italy
- Discovery date: 23 July 1864

Designations
- Alternative designations: 1864 III

Orbital characteristics
- Epoch: 16 October 1864 (JD 2402160.5)
- Observation arc: 213 days
- Number of observations: 57
- Aphelion: 2,900 AU
- Perihelion: 0.931 AU
- Semi-major axis: 1,450 AU
- Eccentricity: 0.999358
- Orbital period: 55,242 years
- Inclination: 109.71°
- Longitude of ascending node: 33.666°
- Argument of periapsis: 232.46°
- Last perihelion: 11 October 1864
- T_{Jupiter}: –0.400

Physical characteristics
- Comet total magnitude (M1): 5.2
- Apparent magnitude: 9.0 (1864 apparition)

Comet Donati–Toussaint, formally designated as C/1864 O1, is a non-periodic comet co-discovered by Italian astronomers, Giovanni Battista Donati and Carlo Toussaint in July 1864.

== Discovery and observations ==
On the night of 23 July 1864, astronomers Giovanni Battista Donati and Carlo Toussaint spotted a new comet within the constellation Coma Berenices. (Note: Reported initial position upon discovery was: α = 13^{h} 06^{m} , δ = 21° 15′) Their discovery was confirmed four days later on 27 July. Although it never came close to either the Sun or the Earth to allow itself to become a bright object, astronomers were able to observe it until 25 February 1865, and thus were able to determine its orbit with higher precision.
