= C/2014 Q1 (PanSTARRS) =

Non-periodic comet

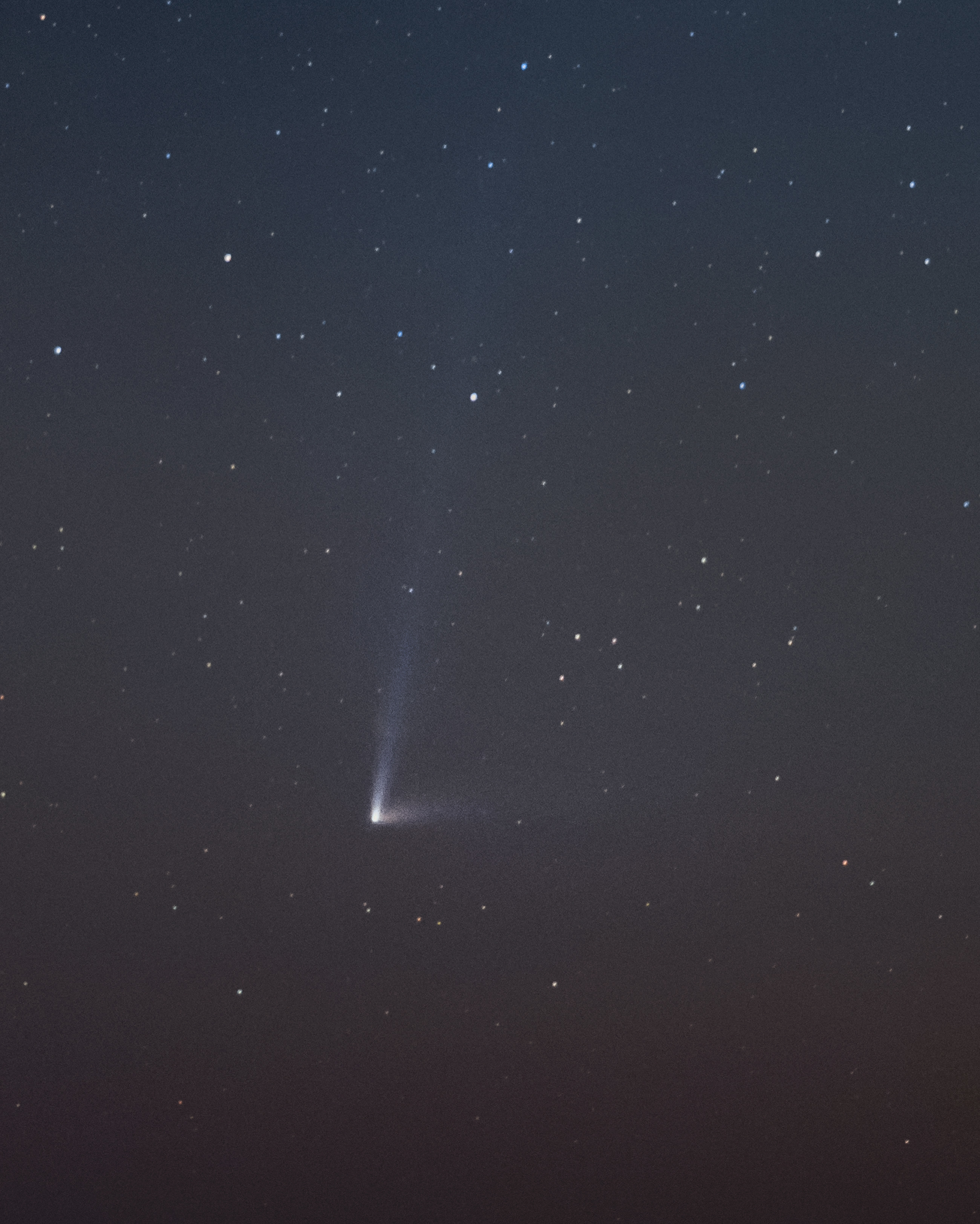
- C/2014 Q1 (PanSTARRS) as seen from the European Southern Observatory on 18 July 2015

Discovery
- Discovered by: PanSTARRS
- Discovery date: 16 August 2014

Orbital characteristics
- Epoch: 17 February 2015 (JD 2457070.5)
- Observation arc: 1.74 years (636 days)
- Number of observations: 704
- Aphelion: ~2,260 AU
- Perihelion: 0.315 AU
- Semi-major axis: ~1,130 AU
- Eccentricity: 0.99972
- Orbital period: ~38,100 years
- Inclination: 43.107°
- Longitude of ascending node: 8.763°
- Argument of periapsis: 120.05°
- Mean anomaly: 359.99°
- Last perihelion: 6 July 2015
- T_{Jupiter}: 0.512
- Earth MOID: 0.091 AU
- Jupiter MOID: 1.585 AU

Physical characteristics
- Mean diameter: 1.6 km (0.99 mi)
- Comet total magnitude (M1): 9.7
- Apparent magnitude: 4.0 (2015 apparition)

C/2014 Q1 (PanSTARRS) is a non-periodic comet discovered on 16 August 2014 by the Panoramic Survey Telescope and Rapid Response System (Pan-STARRS). The comet after its perihelion on 6 July 2015 reached a magnitude of +4 while being in evening twilight. The comet featured three tails during its outbound trajectory.

== Observations ==
C/2014 Q1 (PanSTARRS) was discovered in images taken by the 1.8m Ritchey-Chretien telescope of the Panoramic Survey Telescope and Rapid Response System (Pan-STARRS) on 16 August 2014, when the comet had a magnitude of 18.4, and a preliminary orbit was published on August 19. The comet was observed as it moved northwards and Alan Hale observed it in the morning sky on June 14, 2015, when it featured condensed coma and its magnitude was estimated to be 8.

After its perihelion on July 6, 2015 reached a magnitude of +4 while being in evening twilight. On July 15–16 the comet was reported to have a magnitude of +5.2, however wasn't visible to naked eye because of it being in the twilight. The comet displayed three tails, an ion tail, the main dust tail and a broad dust tail at a right angle in respect to them. The ion tail was 1.5 degrees long and appeared to fork while the main dust tail was half a degree long. The dust tail indicated that the activity of the comet reduced rapidly between July 6 and July 12, as a gap in the dust tail appeared on 2015 July 14, 8 days after perihelion at 0.318 au, and progressed along the tail, following the expected motion of the dust that should have been present. The gap corresponds to dust ejected between July 5 and July 12.

The comet was observed by SWAN instrument onboard SOHO during its perihelion. The water production rate rose sharply during the days near perihelion, when the comet was less than 0,7 AU from the Sun, at 2×10^{30} molecules per second. The sharp increase indicates that grainy ices and chunks of ice were continuously removed from the surface of the comet, resulting in increased sublimation. It is calculated that the nucleus of the comet lost more than half of its mass during the passage.
