= C/2019 U6 (Lemmon) =

Non-periodic comet

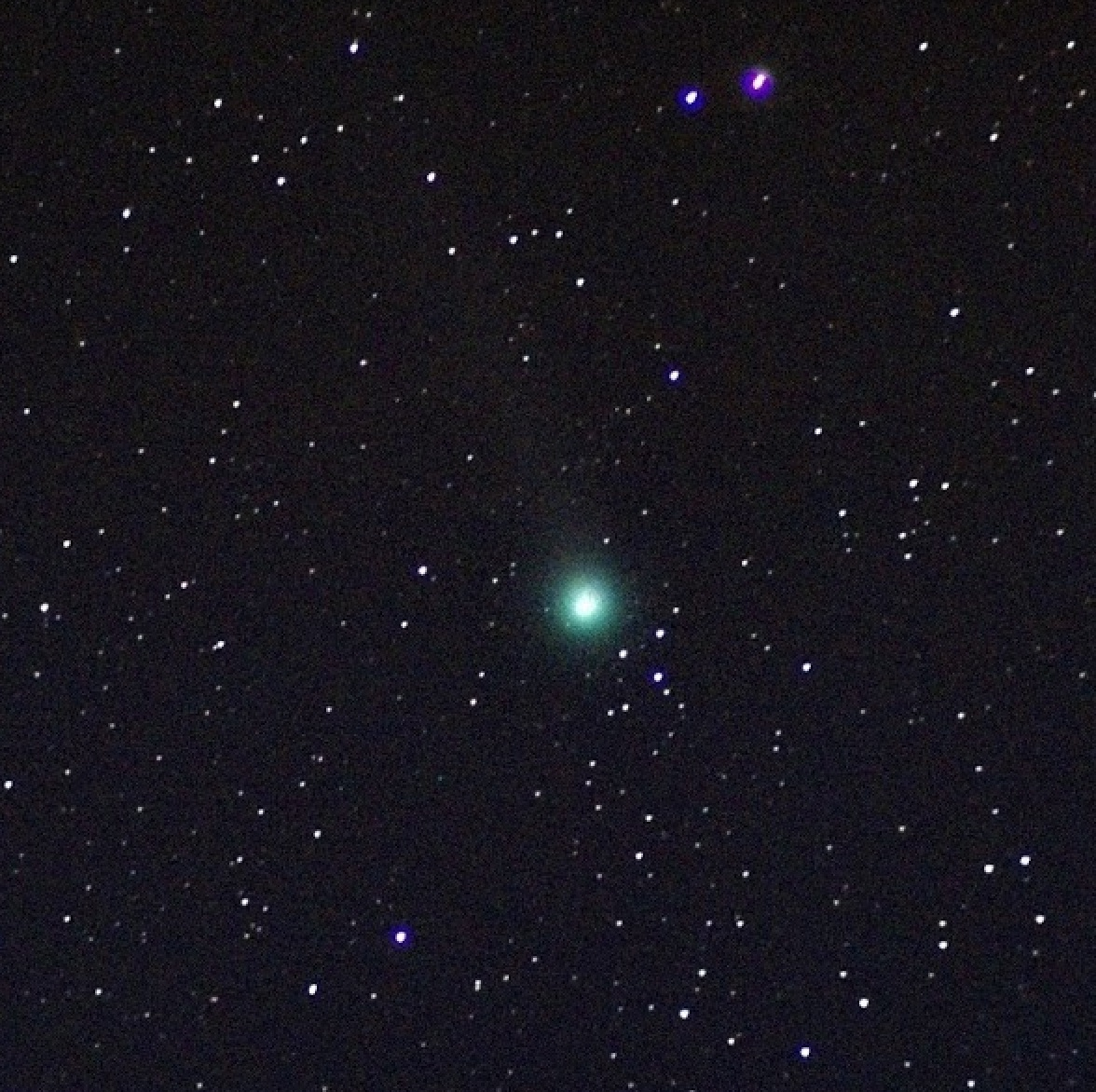
- C/2019 U6 observed with an amateur telescope in June 2020

Discovery
- Discovered by: Mount Lemmon Survey

Orbital characteristics
- Observation arc: 1.54 yr
- Aphelion: 960 AU (inbound); 604 AU (outbound)
- Perihelion: 0.91427 AU
- Orbital period: ~10,500 yr (inbound); ~5,200 yr (outbound)
- Last perihelion: 18 June 2020
- Earth MOID: 0.029 AU

Physical characteristics
- Mean diameter: 4.12 ± 0.81 km (2.56 ± 0.50 mi)
- Apparent magnitude: 6.0 (2020 apparition)

C/2019 U6 (Lemmon), or Comet Lemmon is a long period comet with a near-parabolic orbit discovered by the Mount Lemmon Survey on October 31, 2019. It made its closest approach to the Sun on June 18, 2020. In June 2020 it was visible near the naked eye limit at an apparent magnitude of 6.0. It is the 3rd brightest naked eye comet of 2020 after C/2020 F3 (NEOWISE) and C/2020 F8 (SWAN). It remained visible near the naked eye limit in June.

This perihelion passage will decrease the comet's orbital period from about 10500 years to about 5200 years.

Even though C/2019 U6 has an Earth-MOID of 0.0288 AU (4.31 million km; 11.2 LD), the closest approach to Earth was on June 29, 2020 at a distance of 0.82 AU (123 million km; 320 LD).
