= C/1985 R1 (Hartley–Good) =

Non-periodic comet

Discovery
- Discovered by: Malcolm Hartley; A. R. Good
- Discovery site: Siding Spring Observatory
- Discovery date: 11 September 1985

Designations
- Alternative designations: 1985 XVII, 1985l

Orbital characteristics
- Epoch: 2 November 1985 (JD 2446371.5)
- Observation arc: 187 days
- Earliest precovery date: 21 August 1985
- Number of observations: 165
- Aphelion: ~12,300 AU
- Perihelion: 0.695 AU
- Semi-major axis: ~6,160 AU
- Eccentricity: 0.99989
- Orbital period: ~480,000 years
- Inclination: 79.929°
- Longitude of ascending node: 358.39°
- Argument of periapsis: 87.033°
- Mean anomaly: 359.99°
- Last perihelion: 9 December 1985
- T_{Jupiter}: 0.182
- Earth MOID: 0.221 AU
- Jupiter MOID: 2.966 AU

Physical characteristics
- Mean radius: 0.88±0.05 km
- Mass: 1.10×10^{12} kg
- Mean density: 490±70 kg/m^{3}
- Comet total magnitude (M1): 8.3
- Apparent magnitude: 6.3–6.6 (1985 apparition)

Comet Hartley–Good, formally designated as C/1985 R1, is a non-periodic comet that was observed from September 1985 to March 1986. It is the sixth comet discovered overall by Malcolm Hartley and the only one for A. R. Good.

== Physical characteristics ==
Ground observations from the comet reveal the presence of organic molecules like CN, CH, C_{2} and C_{3} within its coma. In comparison to comets like 21P/Giacobini–Zinner, the dust-to-gas production ratio for Hartley–Good is relatively low, noting that its dust production is inversely proportional to its distance from the Sun.

Narrow-band photometry measurements reveal that the nucleus of Hartley–Good has an effective radius of roughly 1.7 km (1.1 mi), however this was later revised to 0.88±0.05 km. Recorded light-curve data from the comet suggests that water ice from its surface had started to sublimate at a distance of 2.8 AU (420 million km) from the Sun, while also remaining active throughout its most recent apparition.
