= C/2022 R2 (ATLAS) =

Non-periodic comet

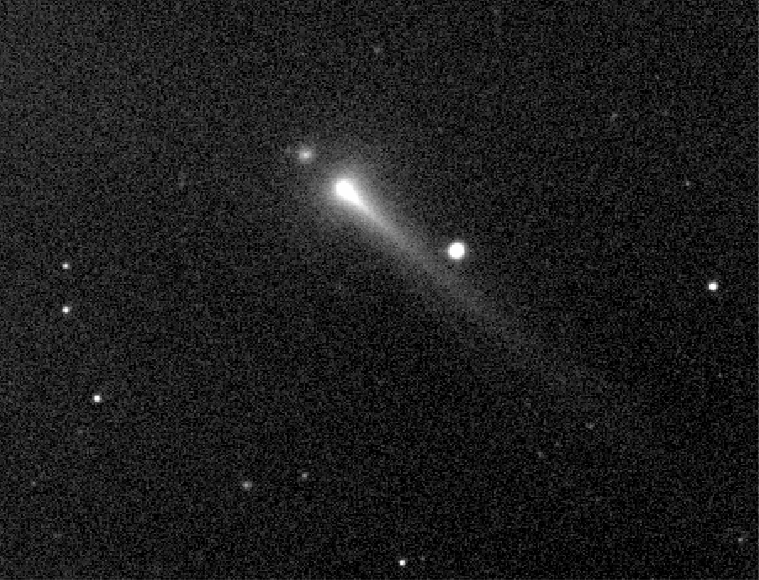
- Comet ATLAS photographed from the Zwicky Transient Facility on 6 October 2022

Discovery
- Discovery site: ATLAS–MLO (T08)
- Discovery date: 14 September 2022

Designations
- Alternative designations: CK22R020

Orbital characteristics
- Epoch: 29 September 2022 (JD 2459851.5)
- Observation arc: 54 days
- Number of observations: 295
- Aphelion: ~845 AU
- Perihelion: 0.633 AU
- Semi-major axis: ~423 AU
- Eccentricity: 0.99850
- Orbital period: ~8,700 years
- Inclination: 52.895°
- Longitude of ascending node: 60.404°
- Argument of periapsis: 78.377°
- Last perihelion: 25 October 2022
- T_{Jupiter}: 0.607
- Earth MOID: 0.045 AU
- Jupiter MOID: 2.381 AU

Physical characteristics
- Comet total magnitude (M1): 16.6
- Apparent magnitude: 14.24 (2022 apparition)

Comet ATLAS, formal designation C/2022 R2, is a non-periodic comet with a very small minimum orbit intersection distance with Earth, only about 0.045 AU (6.7 million km). This has led to an assessment that it may generate a potential meteor shower with a radiant in the general direction from the constellation Lepus by 22–24 November.

On 3 October 2022, observations from the Zwicky Transient Facility showed that the comet had experienced a strong outburst, temporarily increasing its apparent magnitude to 14.24, then rapidly faded away afterwards, indicating that the comet had disintegrated.
