= C/2008 Q3 (Garradd) =

Non-periodic comet

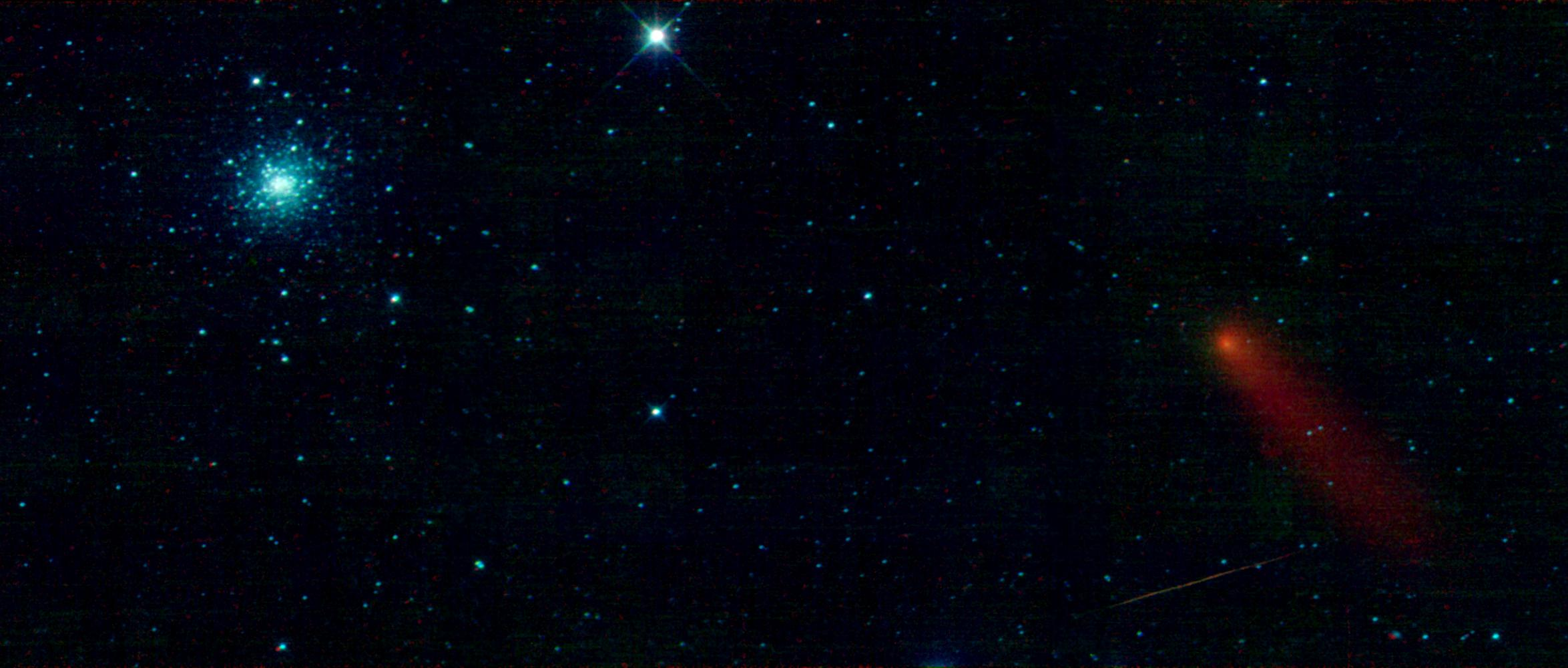
- Photograph of Messier 3 (left) and C/2008 Q3 (Garradd) taken by WISE on 2 January 2010.

Discovery
- Discovered by: Gordon J. Garradd
- Discovery site: Siding Spring Observatory
- Discovery date: 27 August 2008

Orbital characteristics
- Epoch: 27 August 2009 (JD 2455070.5)
- Observation arc: 431 days (1.18 years)
- Number of observations: 701
- Aphelion: ~17,780 AU
- Perihelion: 1.798 AU
- Semi-major axis: ~8,900 AU
- Eccentricity: 0.99979
- Orbital period: ~840,000 years
- Inclination: 140.71°
- Longitude of ascending node: 219.73°
- Argument of periapsis: 340.86°
- Mean anomaly: 0.0001°
- Last perihelion: 23 June 2009
- T_{Jupiter}: –1.286
- Earth MOID: 0.814 AU
- Jupiter MOID: 2.561 AU

Physical characteristics
- Mean diameter: 6.7 km (4.2 mi)
- Comet total magnitude (M1): 6.3
- Comet nuclear magnitude (M2): 12.8

Comet Garradd, formally designated as C/2008 Q3, is a non-periodic comet that was observed from August 2008 to June 2010. It is the 11th out of 17 comets discovered by Australian astronomer, Gordon J. Garradd.

== Physical characteristics ==
Infrared and spectroscopic observations by the Herschel Space Telescope determined that while the comet was around 1.83–1.85 AU (274–277 million km) from the Sun, its water production rate was measured at 1.7–2.8×10^{28}/s^{−1}. Data obtained by Akari detected a relatively high CO/CO_{2} ratio for such a dynamically new comet, which may be caused by an outburst event prior to being observed by the satellite itself.

Its nucleus is estimated to have an effective diameter of 6.7 km (4.2 mi), with a mass roughly about 1×10^{12} kg (2.2×10^{12} lb).
