= C/1999 H1 (Lee) =

Non-periodic comet

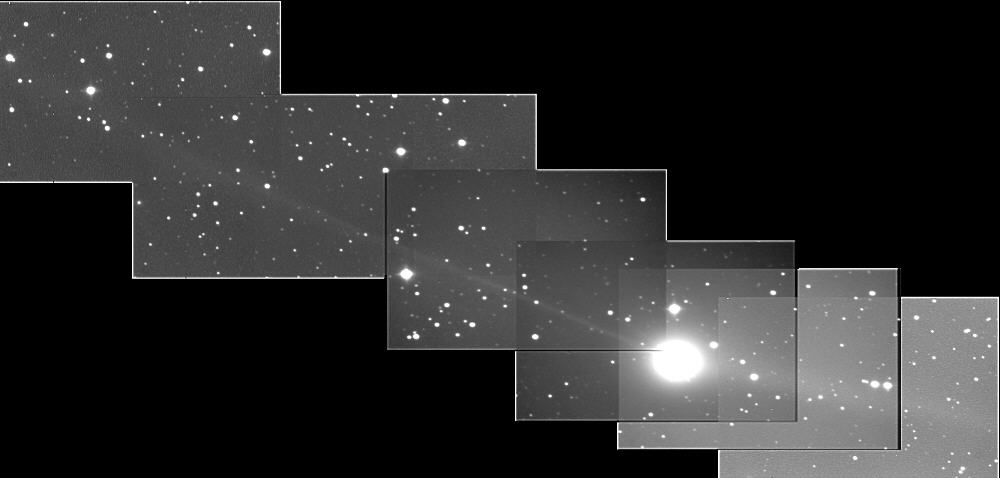
- A mosaic of C/1999 H1 (Lee) taken on 9 December 1999

Discovery
- Discovered by: Steven Lee
- Discovery site: Mudgee, Australia
- Discovery date: 16 April 1999

Orbital characteristics
- Epoch: 17 August 1999 (JD 2451407.5)
- Observation arc: 267 days
- Number of observations: 1,019
- Aphelion: ~5,500 AU
- Perihelion: 0.708 AU
- Semi-major axis: ~2,800 AU
- Eccentricity: 0.99974
- Orbital period: ~146,000 years
- Inclination: 149.25°
- Longitude of ascending node: 162.65°
- Argument of periapsis: 40.702°
- Mean anomaly: 0.0002°
- Last perihelion: 11 July 1999
- T_{Jupiter}: –0.896
- Earth MOID: 0.151 AU
- Jupiter MOID: 0.257 AU

Physical characteristics
- Mean diameter: 12.58 ± 2.30 km (7.82 ± 1.43 mi)
- Comet total magnitude (M1): 9.4
- Comet nuclear magnitude (M2): 13.1
- Apparent magnitude: 6.0 (1999 apparition)

C/1999 H1 (Lee) is a non-periodic comet observed between April 1999 and January 2000. It is the only comet discovered by Australian astronomer, Steven Lee. Lee found the comet visually during a star party near Mudgee, New South Wales on 16 April 1999. He estimated the comet had an apparent magnitude of 9.

== Physical characteristics ==
In February 1999, Comet Lee became the first moderately active comet where its properties were observed and measured by the Hubble Space Telescope in ultraviolet light. Data obtained through the Telescope's STIS revealed the presence of S_{2} within its coma, making it the third comet known where such chemical compound was detected after C/1983 H1 (IRAS–Araki–Alcock) and C/1996 B2 (Hyakutake). Observations of the coma from the La Palma Observatory in June 1999 indicated that the comet was dust-poor, with a relatively high gas-to-dust mass ratio of around 6.5–11.7 and a dust production rate of around Afρ = 500 cm.

Spectrophotometric observations conducted at the European Southern Observatory between May and October 1999 detected the presence of OH, CH_{3}OH, HCN, H_{2}CO, and CS within its coma. Water production rate while it was at least 1.3–1.7 AU (190–250 million km) from the Sun was estimated to be about 3.2×10^{28} sec^{−1} based on observations conducted by the Submillimeter Wave Astronomy Satellite (SWAS) during its outbound trajectory between September and December 1999.

Additional data obtained from the Keck Observatory in August 1999 revealed that the comet is strongly depleted in carbon monoxide gas compared to other comets like C/1995 O1 (Hale–Bopp) and C/1996 B2 (Hyakutake), which may demonstrate the chemical diversity that occurred during the formation of the outer Solar System.

The nucleus is estimated to be roughly 12.58 km (7.82 mi) in diameter.
