= C/2014 N3 (NEOWISE) =

Non-periodic comet

Discovery
- Discovered by: NEOWISE; James Bauer, et al.
- Discovery date: 4 July 2014

Orbital characteristics
- Epoch: 5 August 2015 (JD 2457239.5)
- Observation arc: 2.51 years (917 days)
- Aphelion: ~60,000 AU (inbound); ~4,300 AU (outbound)
- Perihelion: 3.882 AU
- Semi-major axis: ~5,800 AU
- Eccentricity: 0.99933
- Orbital period: ~5.1 million years (inbound); ~98,900 years (outbound)
- Inclination: 61.638°
- Longitude of ascending node: 19.927°
- Argument of periapsis: 353.57°
- Mean anomaly: 0.0003°
- Last perihelion: 13 March 2015
- T_{Jupiter}: 1.161
- Earth MOID: 2.888 AU
- Jupiter MOID: 1.065 AU

Physical characteristics
- Mean radius: ~15.0 ± 3.0 km (9.3 ± 1.9 mi)
- Comet total magnitude (M1): 5.0
- Comet nuclear magnitude (M2): 10.6
- Apparent magnitude: 13.8 (2014 apparition)

Comet NEOWISE, formally designated as C/2014 N3, is a distant non-periodic comet that came to perihelion at a distance of 3.88 AU (580 million km) from the Sun on 13 March 2015. It is one of several comets discovered by the NEOWISE space telescope.
