= Victor Mauvais =

French politician and astronomer

Félix-Victor Mauvais (or Victor Mauvais; March 7, 1809 – March 22, 1854) was a French politician and astronomer. He was born in the small village of Maîche in the department of Doubs and died in Paris.

In 1836 he went to the Observatoire de Paris as a student astronomer. He worked at the Bureau des Longitudes from 1843 to 1854, working on meteorology. He was elected to the Académie des Sciences in 1843. He won the Lalande Prize in 1843 for the discovery of comet C/1843 J1. He also discovered comets C/1844 N1 and C/1847 N1.

In politics, he served as a leftist member of the National Assembly from 1848 to 1849.

On March 2, 1854, the Observatory and the Bureau des Longitudes were separated, which obliged Mauvais to leave this institution. Very affected by this, he fell ill and committed suicide a few weeks later.
