= C/2020 T2 (Palomar) =

Non-periodic comet

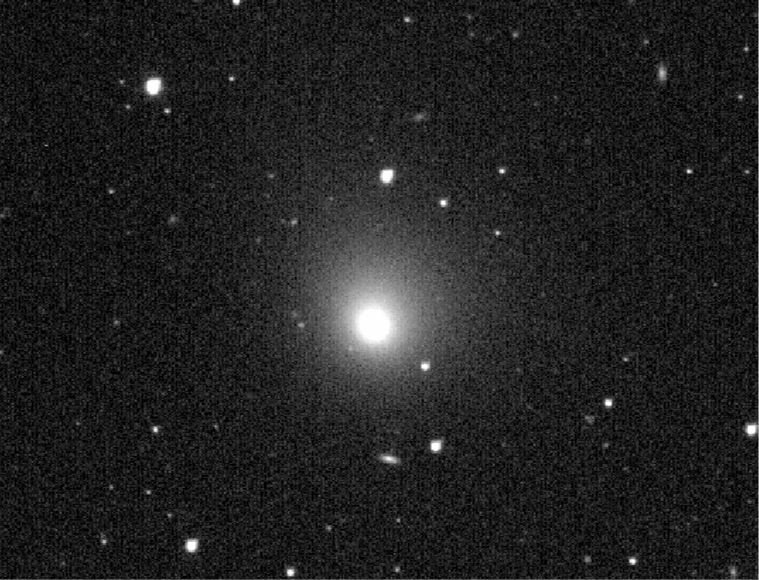
- Comet Palomar imaged by the Zwicky Transient Facility on 12 May 2021

Discovery
- Discovered by: Dmitriy A. Duev
- Discovery site: Palomar Observatory
- Discovery date: 7 October 2020

Designations
- Alternative designations: CK20T020

Orbital characteristics
- Epoch: 15 May 2021 (JD 2459349.5)
- Observation arc: 1,015 days (2.78 years)
- Earliest precovery date: 11 December 2019
- Number of observations: 2,755
- Aphelion: ~620 AU
- Perihelion: 2.05 AU
- Semi-major axis: ~310 AU
- Eccentricity: 0.99343
- Orbital period: ~5,530 years
- Inclination: 27.873°
- Longitude of ascending node: 83.048°
- Argument of periapsis: 150.38°
- Mean anomaly: 359.98°
- Last perihelion: 11 July 2021
- Next perihelion: ~7550s
- T_{Jupiter}: 1.585
- Earth MOID: 1.081 AU
- Jupiter MOID: 1.786 AU

Physical characteristics
- Mean diameter: 11.05 ± 0.1 km (6.866 ± 0.062 mi)
- Comet total magnitude (M1): 9.5
- Comet nuclear magnitude (M2): 12.2

C/2020 T2 (Palomar) is a non-periodic comet with an approximately 5,530-year orbital period around the Sun. It was discovered from the Palomar Observatory on 7 October 2020.

== Observational history ==
The comet was first identified by D. A. Duev when he analyzed the photographic plates taken by the Palomar Observatory on 7 October 2020, where he spotted a tail stretching about 5 arcseconds in length.

Its large perihelion distance of 2.05 AU (307 million km) has enabled numerous follow-up observations to be conducted until 2022. On 10 January 2021, the comet was 2.59 AU (387 million km; 241 million mi) from Earth, and around magnitude 16.4 in brightness. Between 22 January and 5 July 2021, extensive observations from the Purple Mountain Observatory detected traces of hydrogen cyanide (HCN) gas continuously emanating from its coma. On 17 May 2021, the comet was located as a 10.5-magnitude object with an outer green coma measuring 10-arcminutes in size near the Messier 3 globular cluster. Around two weeks before perihelion, observations of the comet noted that it lacked a significant dust tail, but there was a strong condensation on its coma, reminiscent of a typical Manx comet, where near-infrared spectropolarimetry measurements of the comet were also conducted in the same time period. Post-perihelion observations from the Hissar Observatory between 27 August and 2 September 2021 revealed that the upper estimate of the size of its nucleus is roughly 11.05±0.1 km in diameter. By October 2021, the comet faded back to an 11th-magnitude object as it moved away from both the Sun and the Earth.
