= 52872 Okyrhoe =

Centaur

Discovery
- Discovered by: Spacewatch
- Discovery site: Kitt Peak Obs.
- Discovery date: 19 September 1998

Designations
- Pronunciation: /oʊˈkɪroʊ.iː/
- Named after: Ωκυρόη, Ωκυρρόη Ōkyroē, Ōkyrroē
- Alternative designations: 1998 SG_{35}
- Minor planet category: centaur
- Symbol: (astrological)

Orbital characteristics
- Epoch 13 January 2016 (JD 2457400.5)
- Uncertainty parameter 0
- Observation arc: 5393 days (14.77 yr)
- Aphelion: 10.908 AU (1.6318 Tm)
- Perihelion: 5.7875 AU (865.80 Gm)
- Semi-major axis: 8.3478 AU (1.24881 Tm)
- Eccentricity: 0.30670
- Orbital period (sidereal): 24.12 yr (8809.66 d)
- Mean anomaly: 118.92°
- Mean motion: 0° 2^{m} 27.11^{s} / day
- Inclination: 15.665°
- Longitude of ascending node: 173.03°
- Argument of perihelion: 337.79°
- Jupiter MOID: 0.468729 AU (70.1209 Gm)
- T_{Jupiter}: 2.945

Physical characteristics
- Mean diameter: 49 km
- Synodic rotation period: 8.3 h
- Geometric albedo: 0.03
- Spectral type: B–V = 0.743±0.065; V–R = 0.495±0.042
- Absolute magnitude (H): 10.8

52872 Okyrhoe /oʊˈkɪroʊ.iː/ is a centaur orbiting in the outer Solar System between Jupiter and Saturn. It was discovered on 19 September 1998, by the Spacewatch survey at Kitt Peak Observatory in Arizona, United States, and named after Ocyrhoe from Greek mythology.

== Orbit and classification ==
Centaurs have short dynamical lives due to strong interactions with the giant planets. Okyrhoe is estimated to have an orbital half-life of about 670 thousand years. Of objects listed as a centaur by the Minor Planet Center (MPC), JPL, and the Deep Ecliptic Survey (DES), Okyrhoe has the second smallest perihelion distance of a numbered centaur. Numbered centaur (315898) 2008 QD4 has a smaller perihelion distance.

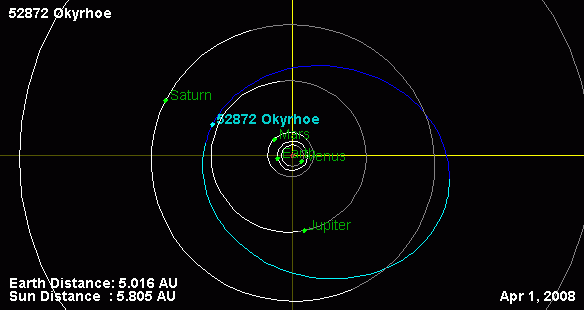
52872 Okyrhoe passed perihelion in early 2008 and brightened noticeably.

== Naming ==
It was named after Ocyrhoe, the daughter of Chiron and Chariclo from Greek mythology.

== Physical characteristics ==
=== Sublimation ===
Okyrhoe passed perihelion in early 2008, and exhibited significant magnitude variations during March and April 2008. This could be a sign of sublimation of volatiles.

== See also ==
- List of centaurs (small Solar System bodies) § 52872
