= Asbolus =

Centaur of Greek mythology

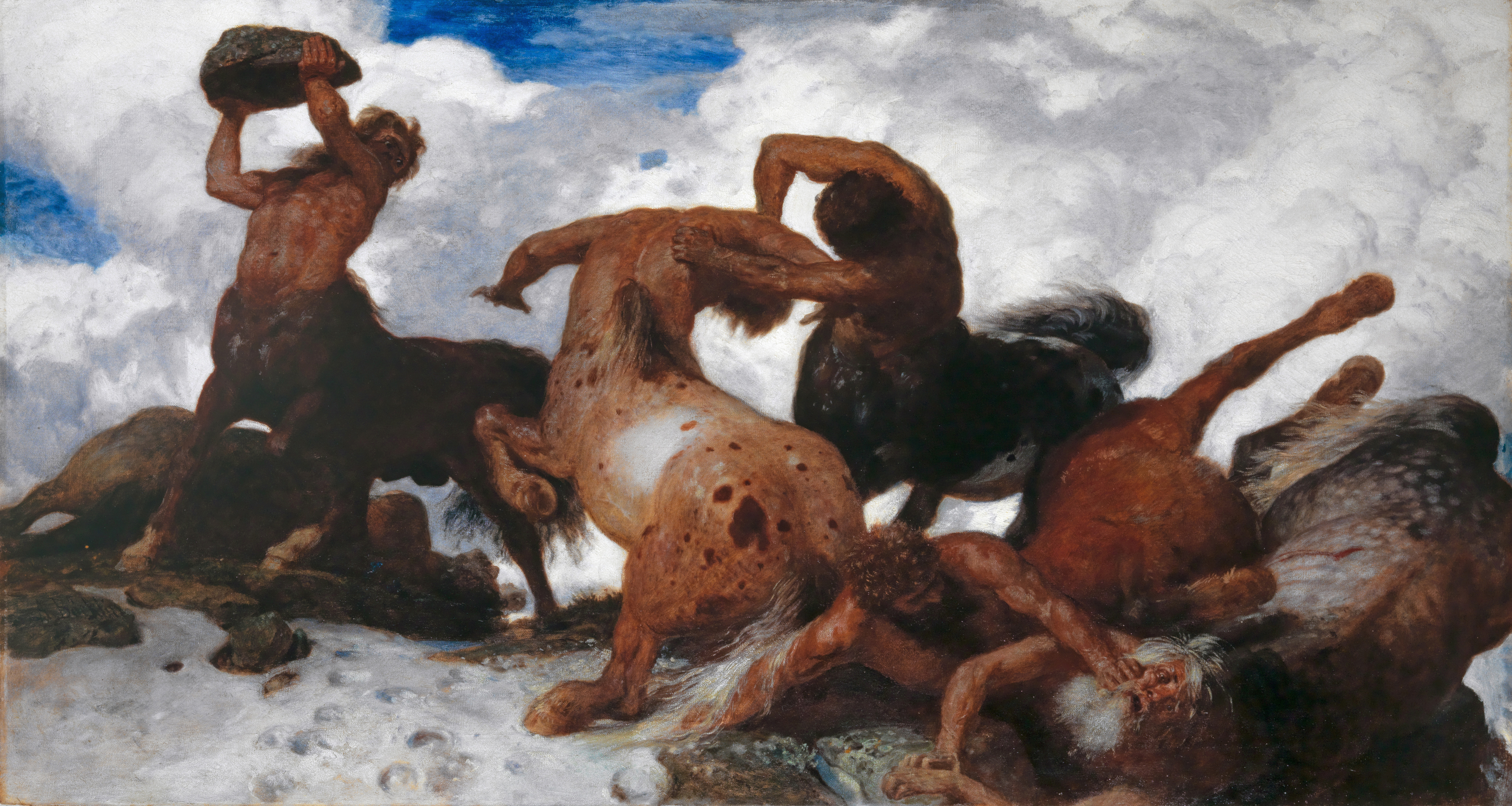
Battle of the Centaurs, Arnold Böcklin (1827–1901)

In Greek mythology, Asbolus (Ancient Greek: Ἄσβολος, romanized: Ásbolos, lit. 'sooty' or 'carbon dust') was a centaur. He was a seer and Hesiod calls him an augur (oionistes οἰωνιστής) who read omens in the flight of birds.

== Mythology ==
Asbolus foresaw the Centaurs' battle against the Lapiths at Pirithous's wedding, and unsuccessfully attempted to prevent them from attending.

The above is mentioned in Ovid's Metamorphoses,

...Asbolus the prophet who had warned,
Though no one heard him, all his friends
To give way, not to fight [the Lapithae]. He cried to Nessus,
"You need not run; you shall be saved till that
Fine day Hercules' arrow strikes your back."

— Ovid, The Metamorphoses, Book 12 (12.308)

He appears again when Heracles came to visit the centaur Pholus. Pholus opened a jug of wine for him which belonged to all the Centaurs; Asbolus saw Pholus do this and brought the other Centaurs, who, as it was proved by Pirithous's wedding, were unused to the drink. It resulted in a bloodbath in which Pholus and Chiron, as well as Nessus, met their deaths at Heracles's hands. It is said that Asbolus himself was crucified by Heracles's arrows.

== Namesake ==
Asbolus's name was given to 8405 Asbolus, a minor planet in the outer Solar System. It belongs to the class of centaurs, whose orbits lie between Jupiter and Neptune.

== See also ==
- Astylus
