= Astronomical Society of Southern Africa =

Astronomical society based in South Africa

- Formation: Cape Astronomical Association - 1912; Johannesburg Astronomical Association - 1918; Astronomical Society of South Africa - 1922; 104 years ago; Astronomical Society of Southern Africa - 1956
- Website: https://assa.saao.ac.za/

The Astronomical Society of Southern Africa (ASSA), formed in 1922, is a widespread body consisting of both amateur and professional astronomers. There are eight autonomous centres throughout Southern Africa.

== History ==
The Cape Astronomical Association was established in 1912, shortly after the 1910 appearance of Halley's Comet. Sydney Samuel Hough, HM Astronomer at the Cape, was chosen President. In 1918, the Johannesburg Astronomical Association was created, with RTA Innes, Union Astronomer, as President. In 1922 it was decided to merge the two Associations to form the Astronomical Society of South Africa after an invitation from the Cape Association. In 1956 the name was amended to become the Astronomical Society of Southern Africa.

== Membership and publications ==
Membership is open to all interested persons. The Society publishes the on-line peer-reviewed journal Monthly Notes of the Astronomical Society of Southern Africa (MNASSA). In addition to MNASSA, the annual handbook Sky Guide Africa South (SkyGuide) is distributed to members and is available for the public.

== Some notable former members ==
- John Caister Bennett served as president of the society for some time from 1969. Bennet discovered comet C/1969 (Comet Bennett) and main-belt asteroid 4093 Bennett is also named after him. He is also the compiler of the Bennett Catalogue.
- Alexander F. I. Forbes discovered comet 37P/Forbes.
- Robert T. A. Innes, discoverer of the nearest star, Proxima Cen
- John Francis Skjellerup was one of the founding members of the society. A number of comets carry his name, including 26P/Grigg-Skjellerup and Comet Skjellerup-Maristany. A comet discovery by Skjellerup was one of the main reasons for the formation of the Cape Astronomical Association in 1912.
- Jan Christian Smuts, South African statesman, World War II leader and author of the preamble to the United Nations charter was an ordinary fee-paying member.

== Gill Medal ==
The Gill Medal is awarded by the Council of the Society for services to astronomy with special consideration to services in southern Africa. It was established in 1955 April and was first awarded in 1956 to Harold Knox Shaw. The Medal commemorates Sir David Gill, HM Astronomer at the Cape (1879–1907), renowned for his numerous researches, especially in positional astronomy and geodesy, and for his part in consolidating astronomical science in Southern Africa.

The medal has been awarded to:

- H. Knox-Shaw (1956)
- W.P. Hirst (1957)
- J. Jackson (1958)
- W.H. van den Bos (1960)
- A.W.J. Cousins (1963)
- R.H. Stoy (1965)
- W.S. Finsen (1967)
- J.C. Bennett (1970) (see Comet Bennett)
- A.D. Thackeray (1976)
- C. Papadopoulos(1981)
- M.W. Feast(1983)
- M.D. Overbeek (1984)
- D.S. Evans (1988)
- B. Warner (1992)
- G. Nicolson (1997)
- I.S. Glass (1999)
- L.A.G. Monard (2004)
- L. Cross (2010)
- D. O'Donoghue (2011)

== Activities ==
Various sections exist within the Society to co-ordinate the activities of special interest groups, including the running of observational programs. They consist of the Comets and Meteor Section, Dark Sky, Deep-Sky, Education & Public Communication, Double Stars, Historical, Occultations, Solar and Variable Stars. A national Symposium, organised by one of the Centres, is held every second year. Scopex, a large public outreach event, is held every year under the auspices of the Johannesburg Centre.

== Autonomous centres ==
The autonomous local centres of ASSA hold regular meetings where visitors are welcomed. Centres are situated in Bloemfontein, Cape Town, Durban, Hermanus, the Garden Route, Midlands, Johannesburg and Pretoria.

== See also ==
- Boyden Observatory
- SEDS SEDS South Africa
- South African Astronomical Observatory
- Southern African Large Telescope
- List of astronomical societies
