= Tom Lloyd-Evans =

British astronomer (1941 – 2014)

Thomas Harry Hope Lloyd–Evans
- Born: 2 December 1941; Wilmslow, Cheshire
- Died: 12 June 2014 (aged 72); St. Andrews, Scotland
- Education: PhD
- Alma mater: University of St Andrews
- Known for: Research into variable stars, carbon stars, and planetary nebulae
- Spouse: Marlene
- Scientific career
- Fields: Astronomy
- Institutions: South African Astronomical Observatory
- Thesis: Photometry of Star Clusters (1968)

Tom Lloyd–Evans (2 December 1941 – 12 June 2014) was a British astronomer who spent most of his career in South Africa.

== Biography ==
Lloyd-Evans was born 2 December 1941 during World War 2 at RAF Wilmslow, the son of Dudley Lloyd-Evans and his wife Margaret Ralston Hope, daughter of Sir Harry Hope. Thomas' father was an R.A.F. flying ace during World War I and was awarded the DFC in 1918. At the time of Thomas' birth, his father was employed by the R.A.F. investigating aircraft accidents. A few months later, his mother took Thomas to the family's estate in Scotland. His father would rejoin them after the war came to an end.

Lloyd-Evans grew up in Kinnettles, Scotland, where his parents encouraged an interest in intellectual pursuits and model making. While attending Fettes College in Edinburgh, he developed an interest in astronomy and joined the Dundee Astronomical Society. In April 1956, he was elected an honorary member of the British Astronomical Association. Between 1958 and 1965, Lloyd-Evans and his brother Robert performed a systematic study of meteor spectra. Lloyd-Evans matriculated to the University of St. Andrews, where he studied astronomy and graduated with honours in 1963. He entered the Ph.D. program at the same institution.

In 1966, he joined the Radcliffe Observatory in Pretoria for a two-year stint as a research assistant. The director of the observatory was Andrew David Thackeray since 1951. Lloyd-Evans spent six years performing photometric and spectroscopic studies of variable stars using the 74-inch (1.9 m) telescope. While at Radcliffe, Lloyd-Evans completed his Ph.D. with a thesis titled Photometry of Star Clusters in 1968.

In 1974, the Radcliffe Observatory was closed and the staff transferred to the newly-formed South African Astronomical Observatory (SAAO). At the new site, Lloyd-Evans focused his studies on variable stars, carbon stars, and planetary nebulae. He took a four-month sabbatical to the Anglo-Australian Observatory in 1980. In 1981, he collaborated with Ian Glass to demonstrate a period-luminosity relationship for Mira variables in the Large Magellanic Cloud (LMC), a dwarf galaxy only observable in detail from the Southern Hemisphere. He joined with an international team to study polycyclic aromatic hydrocarbons in aging stars of the LMC.

Lloyd-Evans developed a number of interests outside astronomy, including archaeology and botany. Among his physical pursuits were hill-walking and scuba diving, incorporating underwater photography in the latter. He met his future wife Marlene while pursuing an interest in Scottish country dancing. They were married in December 1985, and would have a son Robert and a daughter Anne. Marlene was a science teacher who worked in St. Andrews.

During his career, Lloyd-Evans had at least 116 papers published in international refereed journals, and frequently collaborated with other astronomers. He was made an honorary member of the Astronomical Society of Southern Africa in April 1956 and served as president during 1991–1992. Lloyd-Evans retired from the SAAO in March 2001, then departed for Scotland in June. At the University of Nottingham, he was made a Special Lecturer in the School of Chemistry until 2007. To continue his interest in astronomy, he set up a private observatory with a 14-inch (36 cm) Meade reflector. In 2004, the University of St. Andrews provided him a lectureship and office space. He died 12 June 2014.
