= C/1974 V2 (Bennett) =

Non-periodic comet

Discovery
- Discovered by: John Caister Bennett
- Discovery site: Pretoria, South Africa
- Discovery date: 13 November 1974

Designations
- Alternative designations: 1974 XV, 1974h

Orbital characteristics
- Epoch: 19 November 1974 (JD 2442370.5)
- Observation arc: 10 days
- Number of observations: 14
- Aphelion: 19,270 AU
- Perihelion: 0.8646 AU
- Semi-major axis: 9,635 AU
- Eccentricity: 0.99991
- Orbital period: ~946,000 years
- Max. orbital speed: 45.3 km/s
- Inclination: 134.827°
- Longitude of ascending node: 51.348°
- Argument of periapsis: 324.967°
- Last perihelion: 1 December 1974
- T_{Jupiter}: –0.812
- Earth MOID: 0.0356 AU
- Jupiter MOID: 0.8857 AU

Physical characteristics
- Mean radius: 0.624 km (0.388 mi) (Note: Calculated mean radius using the formula: $\log_{10}\,(\,R\,)\ =\;0.9 +\;0.13 (\,H\,)$ Where $\,H\,$ is the comet's absolute total magnitude (M1))
- Comet total magnitude (M1): 8.5

Comet Bennett, formally designated as C/1974 V2, is a non-periodic comet that was seen in 1974. During its most recent perihelion, the comet was observed to split apart and disintegrate.

== Discovery and observations ==
On the morning of 13 November 1974, John Caister Bennett discovered his second comet as a diffuse 9th-magnitude object in the constellation Hydra using a 125 mm (4.9 in) refractor from Pretoria, South Africa. (Note: Reported initial position upon discovery was: α = 11^{h} 16.6^{m} , δ = –33° 48′) He had spent a total of 482 hours searching for a new comet since his first discovery in 1969. At the time, the comet had no discernible coma nor tail, however Bennett was of the opinion it experienced an outburst lasting about five days just before discovery
