= George F. Dodwell =

Australian astronomer (1879–1963)

George Frederick Dodwell (13 February 1879 in Leighton Buzzard, England – 10 August 1963 in Adelaide, Australia) was an Australian astronomer. Dodwell served as Government Astronomer for South Australia from 1909 to 1952.

George Dodwell, 1926

== Life ==
Dodwell was born in England but moved to New South Wales in 1887 and Adelaide, South Australia in 1888. He attended Port Adelaide School, Prince Albert College and received a Bachelor of Arts degree in mathematics from the University of Adelaide. He became a member of the Astronomical Society of South Australia and a Fellow of the Royal Astronomical Society. He was an assistant at the Adelaide Observatory from 1 March 1899. In 1907 he married Annie Louisa Virginia Trehy, herself a versatile scientist who died in 1924. He joined the staff of the Adelaide Observatory at West Terrace, University of Adelaide in March 1899, as a Junior Computor. In June 1909, after the death of Sir Charles Todd, Dodwell became Government Astronomer for South Australia, a position he held until his retirement on 31 October 1952.

Under Dodwell's direction, the observatory helped establish the boundary between South Australia and Victoria along the 141° of longitude, and the boundary between Western Australia and the Northern Territory at the north extension of the 129° of longitude. This limit was set in 1929 using wireless telegraphy, a method that was unique at the time, and used a time signal from a radio station in France. Other work included a survey of the magnetic field in South Australia and latitude variability studies in collaboration with the La Plata Observatory, the International Latitude Congress and the IAU. On 21 September 1922, Dodwell photographed the total solar eclipse in northern South Australia to collaborate with foreign astronomers in an early study of Einstein's theory of the effect of gravity on the propagation of light. At the 1st General Assembly of the IAU in Rome in 1922 he was the representative of the Australian government.

On 17 December 1932, Dodwell discovered comet C/1932 Y1 (Dodwell-Forbes), with Alexander F. I. Forbes.

Dodwell had been interested in studies of the obliquity of the ecliptic since the mid-1930s. He believed that the available historical measurements of this value indicated that there had been a large change in this value caused by an impact in 2345 BC, which he believed was the date of Noah's Flood recorded in the Bible. He was a devout Christian who believed the story of Noah's Ark was historically true. His manuscript was not published until after his death.

He is buried in Nailsworth (North Road) Cemetery, Adelaide alongside his wife.

The Dodwell Observatory in Arkaroola, South Australia is named after Dodwell.

== Books ==
- GF Dodwell: The Obliquity of the Ecliptic.
