= 8405 Asbolus =

Centaur

Discovery
- Discovered by: Spacewatch
- Discovery site: Kitt Peak Obs.
- Discovery date: 5 April 1995

Designations
- Pronunciation: /ˈæzbələs/
- Named after: Άσβολος Asbolos (Greek mythology)
- Alternative designations: 1995 GO
- Minor planet category: distant · centaur
- Symbol: (astrological)

Orbital characteristics
- Epoch 4 September 2017 (JD 2458000.5)
- Uncertainty parameter 1
- Observation arc: 16.60 yr (6,063 days)
- Aphelion: 29.118 AU
- Perihelion: 6.8145 AU
- Semi-major axis: 17.966 AU
- Eccentricity: 0.6207
- Orbital period (sidereal): 76.15 yr (27,815 days)
- Mean anomaly: 71.410°
- Mean motion: 0° 0^{m} 46.44^{s} / day
- Inclination: 17.638°
- Longitude of ascending node: 6.1324°
- Time of perihelion: 2078-Dec-17; 2002-Jul-28 (previous)
- Argument of perihelion: 290.06°

Physical characteristics
- Mean diameter: 66±8 km 76 km 77.5±7.5 km 80.83 km (derived); 84±8 km 85±9 km
- Synodic rotation period: 4.4682±0.0003 h 8 h 8.870 h 8.932±0.002 h 8.9351 h
- Geometric albedo: 0.04; 0.05; 0.056±0.019; 0.057 (assumed); 0.095±0.015; 0.12±0.03; 0.13±0.03
- Spectral type: BR
- Absolute magnitude (H): 8.74 · 9.1 · 9.11±0.02 · 9.13±0.25 · 9.18 · 9.19 · 9.257±0.120 (R) · 9.26

8405 Asbolus /ˈæzbələs/ is a centaur orbiting in the outer Solar System between the orbits of Jupiter and Neptune. It was discovered on 5 April 1995, by James Scotti and Robert Jedicke of Spacewatch (credited) at Kitt Peak Observatory in Arizona, United States. It is named after Asbolus, a centaur in Greek mythology and measures approximately 80 kilometers in diameter.

== Orbit and classification ==
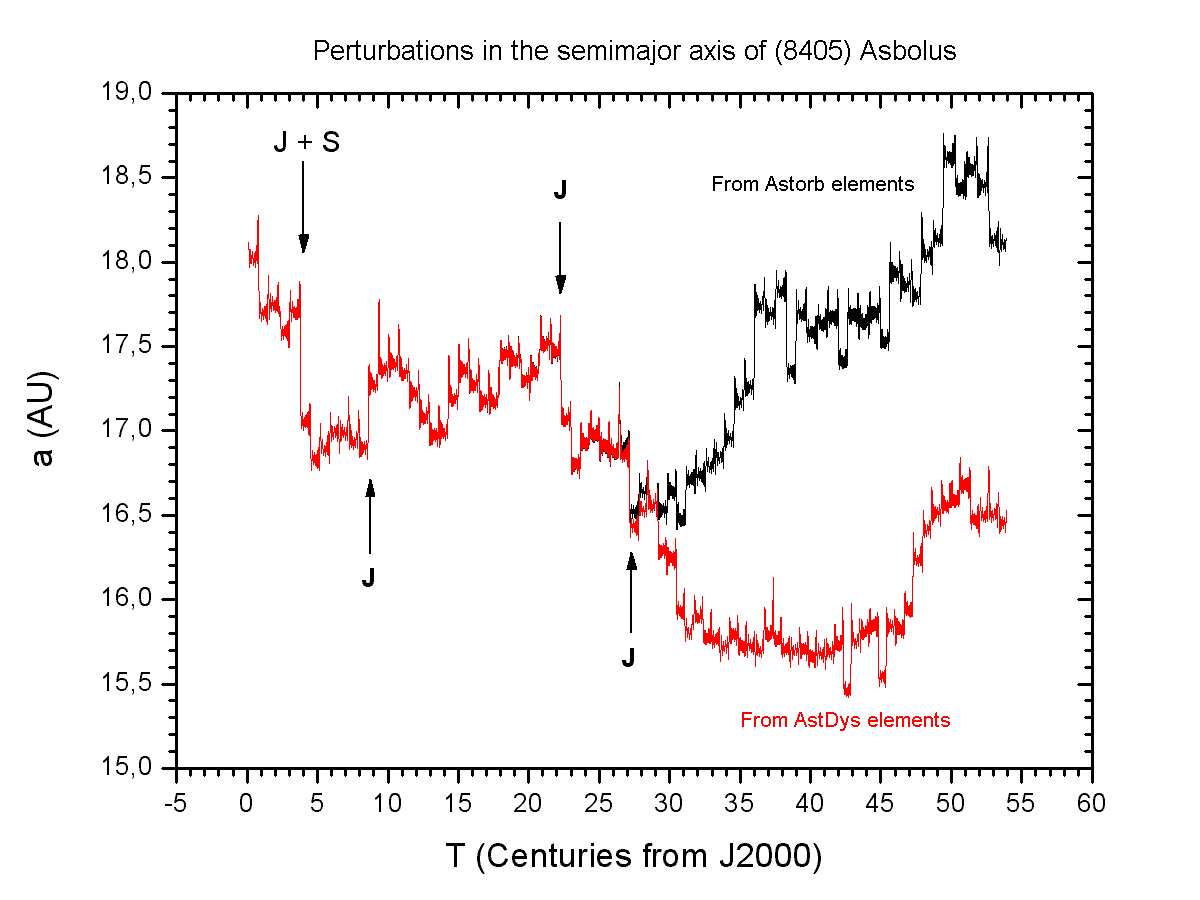
Orbital perturbation: changes in Asbolus's semi-major axis during the next 5500 years. After the encounter with Jupiter in 2700 years, the orbit becomes unpredictable.

Centaurs have short dynamical lifetimes due to perturbations by the giant planets. Asbolus is estimated to have an orbital half-life of about 860 kiloannum. Asbolus is currently classified as a SN centaur since Saturn is considered to control the perihelion and Neptune controls the aphelion.

It currently has a perihelion of 6.8 AU, so it is also influenced by Jupiter. Centaurs with a perihelion less than 6.6 AU are very strongly influenced by Jupiter and for classification purposes are considered to have a perihelion under the control of Jupiter. In about ten thousand years, clones of the orbit of Asbolus suggest that its perihelion classification may come under the control of Jupiter.

Predicting the overall orbit and position of Asbolus beyond a few thousand years is difficult because of errors in the known trajectory, error amplification by perturbations due to all of the giant planets, and the possibility of perturbation as a result of cometary outgassing and fragmentation. Compared to centaur 7066 Nessus, the orbit of Asbolus is currently much more chaotic.

== Naming ==
This minor planet was named from Greek mythology after Asbolus (Greek for "sooty", "the black one"), a centaur capable to read omens in the flight of birds. He provoked a bloodbath in which the centaurs Chiron and Pholus met their deaths at Heracles's hands. The minor planets 2060 Chiron, 5145 Pholus and 5143 Heracles are named after these mythological figures. The official naming citation was published on 28 September 1999 (M.P.C. 36128).

== Physical characteristics ==
Comparison of sizes, albedos, and colors of various large centaurs with measured diameters. Asbolus is at the left in the bottom row.

No resolved images of it have ever been made, but in 1998 spectral analysis of its composition by the Hubble Space Telescope revealed a fresh impact crater on its surface, less than 10 million years old. Centaurs are dark in colour, because their icy surfaces have darkened after long exposure to solar radiation and the solar wind. However, fresh craters excavate more reflective ice from below the surface, and that is what Hubble has detected on Asbolus.

== See also ==
- List of centaurs (small Solar System bodies) § 8405
