= C/1932 Y1 (Dodwell–Forbes) =

Long-period comet

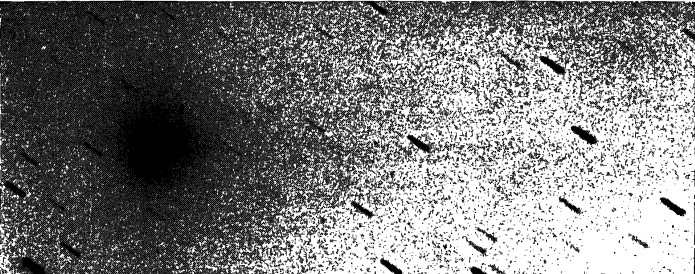
- Comet Dodwell–Forbes photographed by George van Biesbroeck on 20 January 1933

Discovery
- Discovered by: George F. Dodwell; Alexander F. I. Forbes
- Discovery site: Adelaide, Australia; Cape Colony, South Africa
- Discovery date: 15–17 December 1932

Designations
- Alternative designations: 1932n 1932 X

Orbital characteristics
- Epoch: 20 January 1933 (JD 2427092.5)
- Observation arc: 63 days
- Number of observations: 23
- Aphelion: 80 AU
- Perihelion: 1.131 AU
- Semi-major axis: 40.6 AU
- Eccentricity: 0.97216
- Orbital period: 259 years
- Max. orbital speed: 39.3 km/s
- Inclination: 24.502°
- Longitude of ascending node: 78.589°
- Argument of periapsis: 327.357°
- Last perihelion: 30 December 1932
- Next perihelion: ~2191
- T_{Jupiter}: 1.320
- Earth MOID: 0.2040 AU
- Jupiter MOID: 0.7849 AU

Physical characteristics
- Comet total magnitude (M1): 9.1
- Apparent magnitude: 8.0 (1933 apparition)

Comet Dodwell–Forbes, formally designated as C/1932 Y1, is a long-period comet discovered independently by Alexander F. I. Forbes and George F. Dodwell in late 1932. It was Dodwell's only comet discovery, while it was Forbes's third overall.

== Discovery and observations ==
The comet was the brightest of thirteen comets observed in 1932, when George F. Dodwell reported his discovery on 17 December 1932. However, it was soon realized that Alexander F. I. Forbes first spotted the comet from his 8 in (20 cm) reflector two days earlier. The comet was a 10th-magnitude object at the time of its discovery.

In 1949, it was speculated that comet Dodwell–Forbes and eight known others were members of a "Neptune-family" of comets based on their similar aphelia (85 AU) and orbital periods ranging between 235 and 300 years. However, it is now concluded that this comet family did not exist, and their apparent association with Neptune were a result of orbital resonances with Jupiter.
