= 38P/Stephan–Oterma =

Periodic comet with 38 year orbit

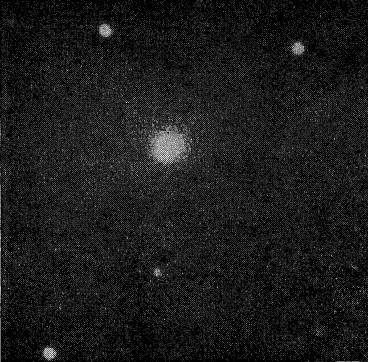

Discovery
- Discovered by: Coggia, Jerome E.
- Discovery date: January 22, 1867

Designations
- Alternative designations: P/1867 B1, P/1942 V1; P/1980 L2

Orbital characteristics
- Epoch: 1981-Apr-26 (JD 2444720.5)
- Aphelion: 20.920 AU (near Uranus orbit)
- Perihelion: 1.5744 AU (near Mars orbit)
- Semi-major axis: 11.247 AU
- Eccentricity: 0.86002
- Orbital period: 37.72 yr
- Inclination: 17.981°
- Last perihelion: November 10, 2018
- Next perihelion: 2056-Aug-28

Physical characteristics
- Mean radius: 3.435 km (2.134 mi)

38P/Stephan–Oterma (also known as Comet Stephan–Oterma) is a periodic comet with an orbital period of 38 years. It fits the classical definition of a Halley-type comet with (20 years < period < 200 years). It was discovered on 22.9 January 1867, by Jérôme Eugène Coggia at Marseilles Observatory, France. On 25.86 January Édouard Stephan confirmed it was a comet. It was recovered on 6 November 1942 by the Finnish astronomer Liisi Oterma.

38P/Stephan–Oterma last came to perihelion on November 10, 2018. It was recovered by Pan-STARRS on June 24, 2017, while 5.3 AU from the Sun. The next perihelion passage is August 28, 2056.

== Orbit ==
It has perihelion near the orbit of Mars and has aphelion near the orbit of Uranus. Acting like a centaur-hybrid, between the years 1982 and 2067, this object will make close approaches to the giant planets Jupiter, Saturn, and Uranus.

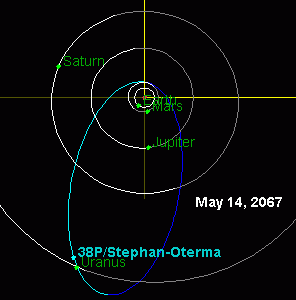
Comet 38P passing within 1.6AU of Uranus in 2067.

Numbered comets
Previous; 37P/Forbes	38P/Stephan–Oterma	Next; 39P/Oterma
