= C/1930 L1 (Forbes) =

Non-periodic comet

Discovery
- Discovered by: Alexander F. I. Forbes
- Discovery site: Cape Town, South Africa
- Discovery date: 31 May 1930

Designations
- Alternative designations: 1930e 1930 V

Orbital characteristics
- Epoch: 6 June 1930 (JD 2426133.5)
- Observation arc: 49 days
- Number of observations: 54
- Perihelion: 1.1528 AU
- Eccentricity: ~1.000
- Orbital period: <270,000 years (inbound)
- Inclination: 97.0912°
- Longitude of ascending node: 279.265°
- Argument of periapsis: 320.966°
- Last perihelion: 10 May 1930

Physical characteristics
- Mean radius: 0.188 km (0.117 mi) (Note: Calculated mean radius using the formula: $\log_{10}\,(\,R\,)\ =\;0.9 +\;0.13 (\,H\,)$ Where $\,H\,$ is the comet's absolute total magnitude (M1))
- Comet total magnitude (M1): 12.5
- Apparent magnitude: 9.0 (1930 apparition)

Comet Forbes, formally designated as C/1930 L1, is a non-periodic comet that was only observed through optical telescopes in the year 1930.

== Observational history ==
The comet was discovered by Alexander F. I. Forbes as a 9th-magnitude object on the early morning skies of 31 May 1930. It was the fifth new comet of the year and the second of three comets he discovered overall. He immediately informed the Union Observatory in Johannesburg after an exact position was determined about two days later.

The comet was already on its outbound flight since it reached perihelion on 10 May 1930, about three weeks before discovery, but was still approaching Earth at the time, allowing it to be regularly observed from Johannesburg until the end of June. It was only visible in the southern hemisphere until 23 June when first northern observations were recorded by the National Observatory in Athens, Greece.

George van Biesbroeck made his first observations of the comet from the Yerkes Observatory on 21 June with Georg von Struve following suit from the Berlin Observatory shortly afterwards, however by that time it rapidly faded away from magnitude 11 to 15 by the end of the month, though a short tail was reported. Van Biesbroeck continued his photographic observations of the comet until 17 July, and its last known position was recorded on 21 July.

== Orbit ==
In 1952, Austrian astronomer Erich Senftl of the Vienna Observatory was able to calculate a retrograde parabolic orbit based from 54 observations over 49 days, which is inclined to 97 degrees from the ecliptic. It reached perihelion at a distance of 1.12 AU (168 million km) on 10 May 1930, and made its closest approach to Earth at a distance of 0.37 AU (55 million km) on 21 June. Due to limited data acquired, it is unknown whether it remains bound to the Solar System or it was ejected into interstellar space.
