= (315898) 2008 QD4 =

Centaur

(315898) 2008 QD_{4}
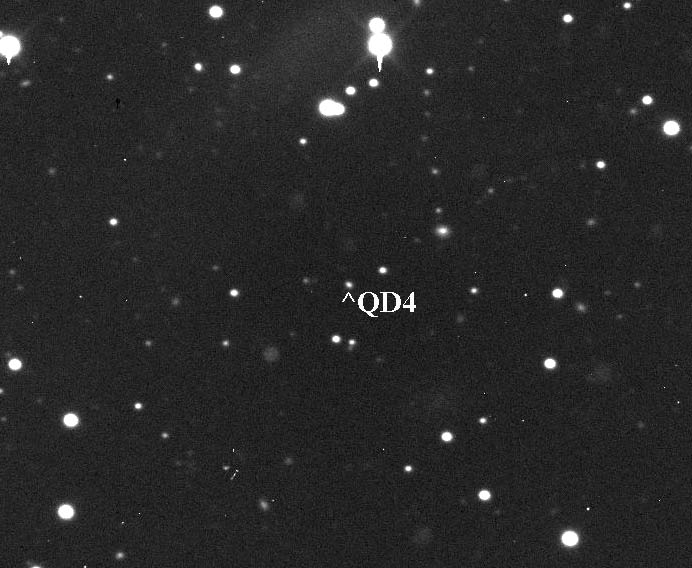
- Centaur 2008 QD_{4} (apmag 19) as seen with 24" telescope

Discovery
- Discovered by: Mallorca Obs.
- Discovery site: La Sagra Obs.
- Discovery date: 25 August 2008

Designations
- Minor planet category: centaur

Orbital characteristics
- Epoch 13 January 2016 (JD 2457400.5)
- Uncertainty parameter 1
- Observation arc: 2744 days (7.51 yr)
- Aphelion: 11.364 AU (1.7000 Tm) (Q)
- Perihelion: 5.4531 AU (815.77 Gm) (q)
- Semi-major axis: 8.4087 AU (1.25792 Tm) (a)
- Eccentricity: 0.35149 (e)
- Orbital period (sidereal): 24.38 yr (8906.16 d)
- Mean anomaly: 79.666° (M)
- Mean motion: 0° 2^{m} 25.516^{s} / day (n)
- Inclination: 42.028° (i)
- Longitude of ascending node: 344.70° (Ω)
- Argument of perihelion: 68.923° (ω)
- Earth MOID: 4.6941 AU (702.23 Gm)
- Jupiter MOID: 1.46448 AU (219.083 Gm)
- T_{Jupiter}: 2.387

Physical characteristics
- Mean diameter: 31 km
- Geometric albedo: 0.05 (assumed)
- Absolute magnitude (H): 11.4

(315898) 2008 QD_{4} is a centaur orbiting in the outer Solar System with a perihelion greater than Jupiter and a semi-major axis less than Saturn.

== Perihelion ==
2008 QD_{4} is listed as a centaur by the Minor Planet Center, Jet Propulsion Laboratory, and the Deep Ecliptic Survey (DES). Of numbered objects listed as a centaur by all 3 major institutions, 2008 QD_{4} has the smallest perihelion distance.

It came to perihelion in August 2010.

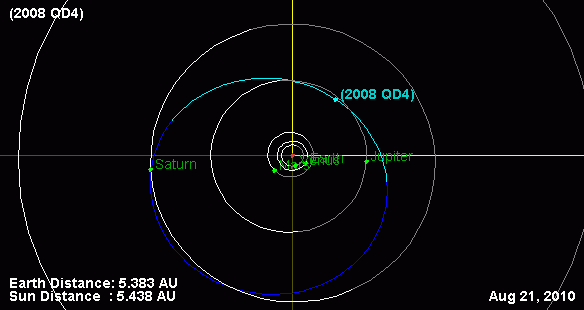
Of objects listed as a centaur by all 3 major institutions, 2008 QD_{4} has the smallest perihelion distance. Due to a 41° orbital inclination, it is above the ecliptic plane when crossing Jupiter's orbit, and below the ecliptic when crossing Saturn's orbit.

== See also ==
- List of centaurs (small Solar System bodies) § 315898
