= Comet Bennett =

Great Comet of 1970

C/1969 Y1 (Bennett) (Great Comet of 1970)
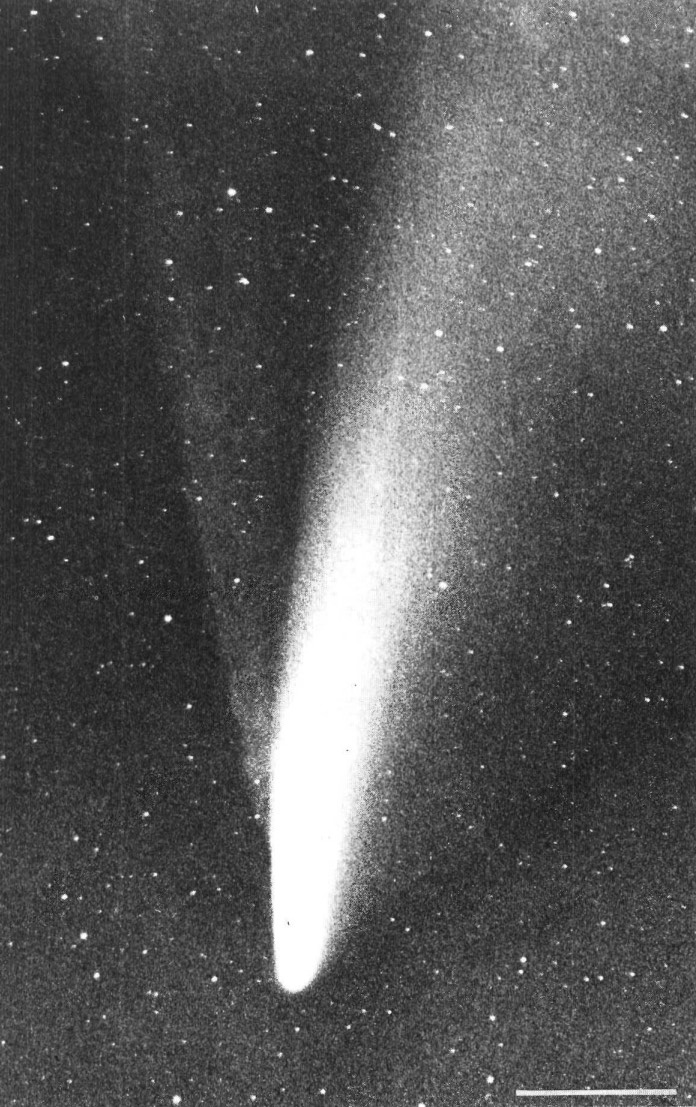
- Comet Bennett photographed by S. M. Larson and R. B. Minton on 30 March 1970

Discovery
- Discovered by: John Caister Bennett
- Discovery site: Pretoria, South Africa
- Discovery date: 28 December 1969

Designations
- Alternative designations: 1970 II, 1969i

Orbital characteristics
- Epoch: 12 April 1970 (JD 2440688.5)
- Observation arc: 301 days – 1,607 years
- Earliest precovery date: September 363 AD?
- Number of observations: 529
- Aphelion: 289.54 AU
- Perihelion: 0.538 AU
- Semi-major axis: 145 AU
- Eccentricity: 0.99629
- Orbital period: 1,747 years
- Inclination: 90.04°
- Longitude of ascending node: 224.7°
- Argument of periapsis: 354.1°
- Last perihelion: 20 March 1970
- Next perihelion: ~3600
- T_{Jupiter}: 0.035
- Earth MOID: 0.4690 AU
- Jupiter MOID: 2.6681 AU

Physical characteristics
- Mean radius: 3.76±0.46 km
- Geometric albedo: 0.66±0.13
- Comet total magnitude (M1): 4.6
- Apparent magnitude: 0.0 (1970 apparition)

Comet Bennett, formally known as C/1969 Y1 (old style 1970 II and 1969i), was one of the two bright comets observed in the 1970s, along with Comet West and is considered a great comet. The name is also borne by an altogether different comet, C/1974 V2. Discovered by John Caister Bennett on December 28, 1969, while still almost two AUs from the Sun, it reached perihelion on March 20, passing closest to Earth on 26 March 1970, as it receded, peaking at magnitude 0. It was last observed on 27 February 1971.

== Observational history ==
The comet was discovered by John Caister Bennett on 28 December 1969 from Pretoria, South Africa, during his comet seeking routine. The comet was located in the constellation Tucana, in 65° south declination, and had an estimated magnitude of 8.5. At that time the comet was about 1.7 AU both from the Sun and the Earth. The orbit was computed by M. P. Candy of the Perth Observatory and it became apparent that the comet could become a bright object by the end of March, during its perihelion at a distance of 0.54 AU (81 million km), as it moved northwards.

The comet became visible to the naked eye in February, and the first week of that month it had a magnitude of 5 and its tail measured about one degree in length. By the end of February the comet had brightened to a magnitude of 3.5 while its tail was about two degrees long. The comet continued to brighten during March, as it approached both the Sun and Earth. By the middle of the month it was a first magnitude object with a prominent curved tail about 10 degrees long.

The comet reached perihelion on 20 March and crossed the equator on 25 March, becoming better visible in the morning sky of the north hemisphere, staying at an elongation greater than 32 degrees. On 26 March was the perigee of the comet, when it approached Earth at a distance of 0.69 AU (103 million km). The comet was then at the square of Pegasus and continued moving northwards until it reached its maximum north declination of 83° in August, when the comet was in the constellation of Camelopardalis. The comet at the start of April had a magnitude of 1, but as it receded both from the Sun and Earth, it had dimmed to a magnitude of 3-4 by the end of April, when it was circumpolar, located in Cassiopeia. The comet had in April two tails, with the longest being 20-25 degrees long. Although by the start of May the comet head had faded to magnitude 5, its tail was still 10-15 degrees long, but by the end of the month it was only 2.5 degrees long. It was last seen by naked eye around mid May.

The comet was observed to fade during summer, autumn and winter. By the start of July it was around magnitude 10 and by the September it was magnitude 12. In January 1971 it was photographed as an 18.9 magnitude object. It was last photographed by Elizabeth Roemer on 27 February 1971, when the comet was 4.9 AU (730 million km) from the Sun and 5.3 AU (790 million km) from Earth.

In 1979, Ichiro Hasegawa tentatively identified a comet observed in September 363 AD as a previous apparition of C/1969 Y1 (Bennett).

== Scientific results ==
Soon after the first orbital elements could be calculated, it was suggested that the comet would become "a bright object, that could be observed with unaided eye." It was found to combine three favorable characteristics that made it an exceptional comet for observation: a short perihelion distance, a short distance from Earth, and high intrinsic brightness. Numerous research projects were therefore initiated, so that Comet Bennett became the most photographed and most thoroughly researched comet at the time of its appearance.

=== Ultraviolet observations ===
A few years earlier it had been suggested that comets are surrounded by a shell of hydrogen gas, which could be detected by observing in the ultraviolet the Lyman α line at 121.5 nm. However, this observation is not possible from the ground because the ultraviolet light does not penetrate the atmosphere. The first observation of a comet in the ultraviolet came in January 1970 when the Orbiting Astronomical Observatory 2 (OAO-2) acquired the spectrum of comet C/1969 T1 (Tago–Sato–Kosaka) and verified the predicted hydrogen envelope. In February of the same year, Comet Bennett reached a favorable observation position for observation from space and was systematically observed with OAO-2 and OGO-5 on the basis of this discovery from mid-March to mid-April in order to track the temporal and spatial changes in the comet's coma.

From the photometric data obtained with OAO-2, the production rates of OH and H and their dependence on the comet's distance from the sun could be derived. The results confirmed the assumption that the gas production of comets at small solar distances is determined by the evaporation of water from the nucleus. The total loss of water during its passage through the inner solar system has been estimated at 200 million tonnes.

The comet was also observed for the first time by the Orbiting Geophysical Observatory (OGO-5) on April 1 and 2. With a more sensitive photometer than with OAO-2, emissions from hydrogen atoms could be detected up to a distance of several million km from the comet's nucleus. From the measurements, the mass of this hydrogen could be derived at about 2 million tones. After these first successful measurements, it was decided to continue observing the comet with the instruments on board OGO-5 and thus a total of twelve intensity maps of the comet's Lyman-α emission were obtained by April 30. The maps show the evolution of the hydrogen envelope over the course of a month. On April 1, when the comet was about 0.6 AU from the Sun, the hydrogen envelope was 20 million km × 15 million km in size, after which it slowly began to shrink. The derived hydrogen atom production rate was comparable to the value obtained from the OAO-2 observations. In further investigations, attempts were then made to theoretically underpin the measurement results with greater agreement and to provide refined models for the formation of the hydrogen shells.

=== Visible light ===
At the Goddard Space Flight Center in Maryland, images of the comet were taken from March 28 to April 18, 1970, with interference filters at different wavelengths in the violet, blue, green, and yellow regions of the spectrum. In particular, the emission lines of CN, C_{2}, CO+ and Na were evaluated. Maps of the comet's coma with lines of the same brightness (isophotes) up to a distance of 150,000 km (93,000 mi) from the nucleus were created from these and other images taken on April 8 and 9 at the Hamburg Observatory in white light. Similar surveys were also conducted from March 31 to April 27 at the University of Western Ontario's Hume Cronyn Memorial Observatory in Canada. There, too, images of the comet were taken with interference filters at different wavelengths in the violet, blue and green regions of the spectrum. In particular, the emission lines of CN and C_{2} were measured and their intensity profiles evaluated in parallel and perpendicular directions to the comet's tail and presented in the form of isophotes.

From March 30 to May 7, 1970, spectrographic studies of the comet were made at the Observatory of the University of Toledo in Ohio. In this way, brightness profiles of the emission lines of C_{2} and CN were obtained up to a distance of 100,000 km (62,000 mi) from the comet's nucleus. A brightness profile of the "forbidden" emission line of the oxygen atom at 630 nm was also created from images from April 18. It has been suggested that these atoms result from the decay of CO_{2} and that comet Bennett contained CO_{2} in excess of water. The same images were also used to create a brightness profile of the H_{2}O+ ion up to a distance of about 100,000 km from the nucleus and to determine its production rate. The results could later be revised through improved processing of the data.

From March 7 to 18, images of the comet were taken at the Cerro Tololo Inter-American Observatory in Chile. The comet's tail showed no noticeable disturbances, only pronounced side rays could be observed. This indicates that relatively quiet interactions between the solar wind and associated magnetic fields and the comet were occurring during this period.

Images taken from late March to late May at the Osservatorio Astrofisico di Asiago in Italy were evaluated for the distribution of gas and dust in Comet Bennett's tail. On the 3/4 April, it was observed that the comet's gas tail had been torn off the coma. Spectra of the neutral gas envelope showed the emission lines of CN, C_{2}, C_{3}, CH, NH_{2} and Na. The gas tail showed a diurnal variation in intensity and structure, indicating a very erratic production of CO+. In particular, attempts were also made to correlate a prominent kink observed in the comet's gas tail on April 4 with simultaneous measurements of solar activity and solar wind. This was done using measurement data provided around the same time by the OGO-5, Vela 5, HEOS-1 and Pioneer 8 spacecraft, as well as by the ALSEP experiment installed on the lunar surface by Apollo 12. In a first investigation, no events were found in the measured dynamics of the solar wind that could explain the deformations of the comet's tail. However, further investigation concluded that, first, the dynamics of the solar wind measured near Earth were probably different from those near the comet, and second, the monitoring of the solar wind was patchy in terms of location and time, so that the deformations of the comet's tail can probably still be traced back to events in the solar wind.

Three images of the comet in red light, taken May 5–8 at the Thuringian State Observatory in Tautenburg, when the Earth was almost in the comet's orbital plane, showed two anomalous structures in the comet's tail: a radial structure and a short sunward spikes, probably caused by the comet's dust. The later evaluation of these observations provided evidence for the peculiarity of a "neckline structure" (NLS) in the dust tail of a comet, which was only theoretically derived in 1977.

=== Infrared ===
Observations of the comet's brightness evolution in the infrared were made in late March to mid-April 1970 at the Lunar and Planetary Laboratory in Arizona. In addition, on March 31, 1970, observations were made with an infrared telescope on board a Learjet.

On 4 April 1970, Comet Bennett was photometrically measured at the O'Brien Observatory of the University of Minnesota in the near and mid-infrared at 2-20 μm wavelength. In addition to the continuum of a black body of about 500 K at short wavelengths, an emission line could also be detected at 10 μm, which was traced back to silicate grains in the dust of the comet. The measurement result was confirmed by another measurement on April 21 at Kitt Peak National Observatory in Arizona.

=== Microwaves ===
With the radio telescope of the Green Bank Observatory in West Virginia, an attempt was made over six days in mid-March 1970 to detect the emission of formaldehyde at 4.83 GHz. Likewise, the radio telescope at the United States Naval Research Laboratory in Maryland attempted to detect the emission of water molecules at 22.2 GHz over four days at the end of March 1970. In both cases, no such emissions could be detected.

=== Apollo 13 attempted photograph ===
Comet Bennett was intended to be photographed by the crew of Apollo 13 during their journey to the Moon. Their first attempt on April 13, 1970, was unsuccessful. On April 14, 1970, after completing the maneuver to orient the spacecraft for a second attempt, Odyssey's service module ruptured, forcing the cancellation of the mission's scientific objectives and touchdown on the lunar surface.
