= Alexander F. I. Forbes =

(1871- 1959) South African astronomer, architect and artist

Alexander Forbes Irvine Forbes
- Born: 13 April 1871; Kinellar, Aberdeenshire, Scotland
- Died: 15 May 1959 (aged 88); Cape Town, South Africa
- Known for: Discovery of periodic comets
- Spouse: Louisa Elizabeth Henrietta Crowther
- Scientific career
- Fields: Astronomy, Architecture

Alexander Forbes Irvine Forbes (13 April 1871 – 15 May 1959) was a South African astronomer, architect and artist, best known for his discovery of periodic comets.

== Early life and career ==
Forbes was born in Kinellar, Aberdeenshire, Scotland on 13 April 1871. His father was an amateur astronomer who lived on the estate "Blairythan" in County Aberdeen belonging to another amateur astronomer, David Gill. Forbes senior had built his own telescope and shared his interest in astronomy with his son.

Forbes was educated in Scotland and moved to the Cape Colony, South Africa in 1896. He stayed in Woodstock, Cape Town where he worked as a builder until 1907 when he returned to Scotland to study architecture. He completed his studies in 1909 and became a member of the Institute of Architects. He returned to Cape Town and practiced as an architect there until 1932.

In 1912 he participated in a tender for the design of the city of Canberra, Australia and his architectural design was among the initial shortlist of 46 but was not finally chosen.

He lived in Rosebank, Cape Town where he built a 200mm reflecting telescope and a small observatory at his house, Craigie Brae which was in Liesbeek Road.

Forbes lectured regularly on astronomical topics. In 1921 he read a paper on "Reflecting telescopes, with practical directions for grinding and figuring the mirror" at the Cape Astronomical Association and in 1927 presented "Satellites and their movements" to the Natal Astronomical Society. He wrote about astronomical instruments for the Journal of the Astronomical Society of Southern Africa and notes about his astronomical work for the Monthly Notes of the Astronomical Society of Southern Africa.

== Comet discoveries ==
Forbes discovered four comets :

- In 1928 he rediscovered comet Pons-Coggia-Winnecke (now called Pons-Coggia-Winnecke-Forbes or 27P/Crommelin in honour of the astronomer who computed its orbit.)
- 37P/Forbes
- C/1930 L1 (Forbes)
- C/1932 Y1 (Dodwell–Forbes), discovered with George F. Dodwell

== Membership & recognition ==
- Member of the Cape Astronomical Society
- Honorary treasurer of the Cape Astronomical Society 1922
- Alternative member of council and honorary treasurer for the Astronomical Society of South Africa 1923 - 1932
- Librarian of the Astronomical Society of South Africa 1926 - 1930
- President of the Astronomical Society of South Africa 1942 - 1943
- Director of the Comet Section, Cape Astronomical Society 1929 - 1945
- Director of the Zodiacal Light Section, Cape Astronomical Society 1934 - 1945
- 127th Donohoe Comet Award 1929 (for 27P/Crommelin). He received 3 other Donohoe Comet awards for other discoveries.

== Personal life ==
Forbes married Louisa Elizabeth Henrietta Crowther on 18 September 1900 in the Cape Province. He retired to Hermanus in 1932, where he built another observatory at his house "Blairythan" and moved the telescope from Rosebank to Hermanus. He designed the house and crafted all of its doors himself. Here he continued his observations as well as his architectural work and painting. In 1956 he returned to Cape Town owing to ill health and lived with his niece, Mrs. Hewiston until his death in 1959.

In 2009 one of his paintings, Hermanus Coast Line was sold at auction.
