= C/1969 T1 (Tago–Sato–Kosaka) =

Non-periodic comet

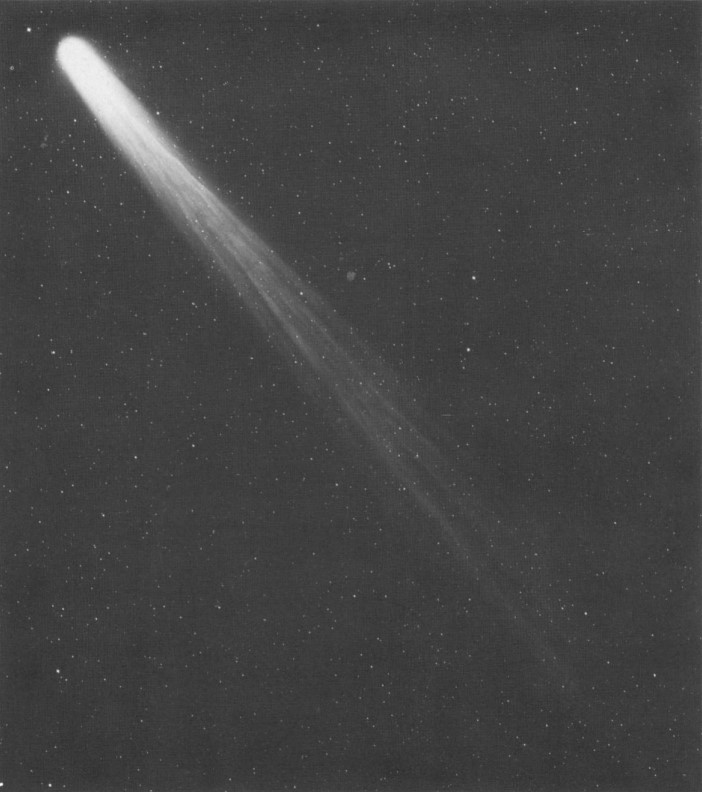
- Comet Tago–Sato–Kosaka photographed from Cerro Tololo on 30 December 1969

Discovery
- Discovered by: Akihiko Tago; Yasuo Sato; Kozo Kosaka
- Discovery site: Japan
- Discovery date: 10 October 1969

Designations
- Alternative designations: 1969 IX, 1969g

Orbital characteristics
- Epoch: 21 January 1970 (JD 2440607.5)
- Observation arc: 305
- Number of observations: 175 days
- Aphelion: ~12,800 AU
- Perihelion: 0.4726 AU
- Semi-major axis: ~6,400 AU
- Eccentricity: 0.99992
- Orbital period: ~512,000 years
- Avg. orbital speed: 57.16 km/s
- Max. orbital speed: 61.3 km/s
- Inclination: 75.818°
- Longitude of ascending node: 109.660°
- Argument of periapsis: 267.834°
- Last perihelion: 21 December 1969
- T_{Jupiter}: 0.210
- Earth MOID: 0.0006 AU
- Jupiter MOID: 3.4637 AU

Physical characteristics
- Mean radius: 2.20±0.27 km
- Geometric albedo: 0.63±0.13
- Comet total magnitude (M1): 6.5
- Apparent magnitude: 3.5 (1970 apparition)

Comet Tago–Sato–Kosaka, formally designated as C/1969 T1, is a non-periodic comet that became visible to the naked eye between late 1969 and early 1970. It was the first comet ever observed by an artificial satellite, OAO-2.

== Discovery and observations ==
The comet was first discovered by Akihiko Tago, a resident of Tsuyama, on 10 October 1969 when he first spotted the comet as a diffuse magnitude 10 object from his 15 cm (5.9 in) reflector telescope. He reported his discovery to the Tokyo Astronomical Observatory about four days later. At the same time, two other independent discoveries were made by 19-year old Yasuo Sato of Nishinasuno, Tochigi and 17-year old Kozo Kosaka of Akasaka, Okayama. Tago had previously co-discovered comet C/1968 H1 a year prior, and he and Sato had spent 344 and 182 hours respectively searching for new comets when they found this object.

In the following days, the comet was observed and photographed by various observatories across Australia, Japan, United Kingdom, United States, and New Zealand, however its brightness remained constant throughout the month. The comet had only two observations in November due to its proximity to the Sun from Earth's perspective. Throughout December, the comet gradually brightened, reaching an apparent magnitude of 4, and slowly developed a tail, reaching about 5 degrees in length by the end of the year.

On 2 January, the comet was spotted with naked eye by Z. M. Pereyra, who estimated its tail to be 10 degrees long. On that date the comet reached its maximum southern declination, at –54°, and started moving northwards. It was also the day the maximum brightness was reported, at 3.6. After the first days of January the comet started fading slowly and its tail was getting shorter. It made its closest approach to Earth on 20 January 1970. The last naked eye observation was reported on 2 February, when the comet had a magnitude of 5.5. A minor outburst took place on 6 February, which was also observed in infrared. The comet was last observed on 4 May 1970.

C/1969 T1 was the very first comet observed by Alan Hale (who later became the co-discoverer of Comet Hale-Bopp), at the time the comet faded as a 5th-magnitude object on 2 February 1970.

== Orbit ==
In 1978, astronomers Brian Marsden, Zdenek Sekanina, and Edgar Everhart were able to calculate the comet's orbital elements based on 305 observations over 175 days. According to their calculations, the gravitational perturbations of the giant planets have increased the comet's semimajor axis from 1,970 AU to 2,320 AU after its most recent perihelion on 21 December 1969. The comet made its closest approach to Earth on 20 January 1970 at a distance of 0.38 AU (57 million km; 35 million mi).

== Potential meteor shower ==
Due to the comet's very small minimum orbit intersection distance with Earth, both Zdenek Sekanina and Ichiro Hasegawa independently considered the possibility of a potential meteor shower originating from this comet, however no significant activity was observed.

== See also ==
- C/1968 H1 (Tago–Honda–Yamamoto)
