= Akihiko Tago =

Japanese astronomer (born 1932)

Akihiko Tago (多胡 昭彦, Tago Akihiko, born 1932) is a Japanese amateur astronomer.

He co-discovered several comets, including C/1968 H1 (Tago-Honda-Yamamoto), C/1969 T1 (Tago-Sato-Kosaka), C/1987 B1 (Nishikawa-Takamizawa-Tago). At the Satsuki Observatory established in 1996, Tago has supported and encouraged amateur astronomers in Yanahara, Okayama. Asteroid 7830 Akihikotago was named to honor his dedication.

He also discovered several novas, including V1493 Aql (Nova Aquilae 1999), V2275 Cyg (Nova Cygni 2001 no. 2), V574 Pup (Nova Puppis 2004), V2467 Cyg (Nova Cygni 2007) and V459 Vul (Nova Vulpeculae 2007 no.2).

In 2006 he was the first astronomer to discover a micro-lensing system outside the Magellanic Clouds and the bulge of our Milky Way. The star GSC 3656-1328 suddenly brightened by four magnitudes in two weeks time and returned to its normal brightness two weeks later. A red or a brown dwarf star passed exactly in front of GSC 3656-1328 and the gravity of the dwarf star directed more light to the observers on Earth.

He lives in Tsuyama, Okayama.

== Publications ==
- Tago, Akihiko (1970). "鈴木・佐藤・関彗星 (1970m) の発見事情" [The discovery circumstance for comet (Suzuki, Sato, Seki 1970m)]. The Tenkai (in Japanese). 51 (547). Kobe, Japan: Oriental Astronomic Association: 368. ISSN 0287-6906.
- Tago, Akihiko (1971). "エンケ彗星の写真" [The comet Enke in photograph]. The Tenkai (in Japanese). 52 (548). Kobe, Japan: Oriental Astronomic Association: 548. ISSN 0287-6906.
- Tago, Akihiko (1982). "マイコンを活用した私の能率的な彗星捜索" [Personal computer helps efficient asteroid hunting]. 天文と気象 Astronomy and Meteorology (in Japanese). 48 (8). Japan: 地人書館 Chijin shokan: 32–35.
- Tago, Akihiko (1999). "本田実先外との星空会話の思い出" [My astronomical dialogue with Minoru Honda]. The Tenkai (in Japanese). 80 (895). Kobe, Japan: Oriental Astronomic Association: 791. ISSN 0287-6906.
- Tago, Akihiko (2000). "私の新星捜索" [Novae and myself]. The Tenkai (in Japanese). 81 (896). Kobe, Japan: Oriental Astronomic Association: 6–10. ISSN 0287-6906.

== Awards ==
- 天文発見功労賞 (Award for distinguished service)
