= Dudley Lloyd-Evans =

Welsh flying ace

- Born: 1895; Newport, Monmouthshire, Wales
- Died: 20 March 1972 (aged 76–77); Cheltenham, England
- Burial place: Grave A80, St. Mary Magdalene's Churchyard, Boddington, Gloucestershire; 51°55′30″N 2°09′19″W
- Military career
- Allegiance: United Kingdom
- Branch: British Army; Royal Air Force
- Service years: 1914–1945
- Rank: Wing Commander
- Units: South Wales Borderers; No. 64 Squadron RAF
- Conflicts: First World War: Western Front; Second World War
- Awards: Military Cross; Distinguished Flying Cross & Bar

Dudley Lloyd-Evans, MC, DFC & Bar (1895 – 20 March 1972) was a Welsh-born soldier, airman and flying ace. After being decorated for his infantry service during the First World War, he transferred to aviation, was credited with eight official aerial victories, and again won military honours for his valour. He remained in the Royal Air Force until the end of the Second World War.

== First World War ==
Dudley Lloyd-Evans' military career began when he was commissioned as a temporary second lieutenant on 8 October 1914. He served in the South Wales Borderers and was awarded the Military Cross for gallantry in December 1916.

Lloyd-Evans then transferred to the Royal Flying Corps and in early 1918 was posted to No. 64 Squadron as a Royal Aircraft Factory S.E.5a pilot. He began a run of solo aerial victories on the last day of May 1918, when he destroyed a German Albatros D.V fighter over La Bassée. He scored the second time on 25 July 1918, destroying a Fokker D.VII. Another fell under his guns on 21 August. Two days later, he destroyed a two-seater LVG reconnaissance plane over Cantin. On 3 September, he drove down a Fokker D.VII out of control for his fifth win, becoming a flying ace. Two days later, he drove another one down northeast of Cambrai. On 18 September 1918, he capped his career as an ace by destroying one Fokker D.VII and driving another one down. His exploits won him a Distinguished Flying Cross, which was gazetted after war's end.

== Inter-war period ==
Lloyd-Evans was granted a short service commission as a flying officer in the Royal Air Force (RAF) on 24 October 1919. This commission was later confirmed as permanent. He won a Bar to his Distinguished Flying Cross in lieu of a second award in 1921 for an aerial rescue sortie in Mesopotamia.

On 1 July 1925 Lloyd-Evans was promoted to flight lieutenant. On 3 January 1930 he was posted to the staff of RAF Middle East. On 24 January 1936 he was posted to No. 8 Flying Training School at RAF Montrose.

On 1 October 1937, Lloyd-Evans was promoted to squadron leader. Evans was posted to No. 5 Flying Training School at RAF Sealand for administrative duties on 4 January 1938.

Lloyd-Evans married Margaret Ralston, daughter of Sir Harry Hope in 1939. They would have two sons: Thomas and Robert.

== Second World War and retirement ==
Lloyd-Evans then rose to the rank of temporary wing commander on 1 June 1940. On 10 September 1945, he reverted to retirement, retaining the rank of wing commander.

Dudley Lloyd-Evans died on 20 March 1972 in Cheltenham, England. He was buried in Grave A80, St. Mary Magdalene's Churchyard, Boddington, Gloucestershire.

== Honours and awards ==
- Military Cross

Temporary 2nd Lieutenant Dudley Lloyd Evans, South Wales Borderers

For conspicuous gallantry in action. He wired the portion of the enemy's intermediate line which was captured that night. Later, he led a bombing attack with great courage and initiative.

- Distinguished Flying Cross

Lieutenant (Acting-Captain) Dudley Lloyd Evans, MC. (South Wales Borderers)

A brilliant fighting pilot who has carried out numerous offensive and low-bombing patrols with marked success. He has accounted for six enemy aeroplanes, and in these combats in the air he is conspicuous for dash, determination and courage.

- Bar to the Distinguished Flying Cross

Flying Officer Dudley Lloyd Evans, MC, DFC.

For gallantry, skill and devotion to duty on 1 November 1920, while accompanying another machine on reconnaissance. Owing to engine trouble the second machine, with pilot and observer, had to make a forced landing in hostile country. A party of mounted Arabs at once started firing at the observer, who was dismantling a Lewis gun. On seeing this, Flying Officer Evans landed at great peril to himself, took both officers his already loaded machine, and getting off with much difficulty, returned to Headquarters.
