= 39P/Oterma =

Periodic comet with 19 year orbit

Discovery
- Discovered by: Liisi Oterma
- Discovery date: 8 April 1943

Designations
- Alternative designations: 1942 VII; 1950 III; 1958 IV; 39P/2001 P3

Orbital characteristics
- Epoch: 2023-06-25
- Aphelion: 8.75 AU
- Perihelion: 5.707 AU
- Semi-major axis: 7.228 AU
- Eccentricity: 0.2105
- Orbital period: 19.43 yr
- Max. orbital speed: 13.2 km/s
- Min. orbital speed: 8.6 km/s (2013-Feb-15)
- Inclination: 1.5470°
- Last perihelion: 2023-Jul-13 (JPL); 11 July 2023; 22 December 2002
- Next perihelion: 2042-Jul-12

Physical characteristics
- Dimensions: 4–5 km

39P/Oterma is a currently inactive periodic comet with an orbital period of nearly 20 years that stays outside the orbit of Jupiter. The nucleus has a diameter around 4–5 km. It was last observed in August 2021 and came to perihelion in July 2023 while 1.2 AU from Jupiter. It made a moderately close approach to Jupiter in January 2025 and will next come to perihelion in July 2042 at distance of 5.9 AU from the Sun. Opposition has occurred on 11 November 2023.

== Discovery ==
The comet was discovered by Liisi Oterma at Turku University Observatory, Finland on a photo plate on 8 April 1943 as a faint object of 15th magnitude in the constellation of Virgo. Its orbit was calculated by L. E. Cunningham and R. N. Thomas who derived an orbit with a small eccentricity, a perihelion distance of 3.4 AU (i.e. a little outside the main asteroid belt) and an orbital period of 7.9 years.

The comet was continuously observed till after its next perihelia of 1950 and 1958, however a close approach (0.095 AU/14.2 Mio. km) to Jupiter on 12 April 1963 put it on its current inactive centaur orbit where it will not become much brighter than 22nd magnitude for a long while. Nevertheless, it was recovered on 13 August 2001 on CCD images taken with the University of Hawaii 2.2 m reflector at Mauna Kea.

In 2022 it was observed by the James Webb Space Telescope and became the first centaur in which CO_{2} emission was detected. The production rate of (5.96±0.80)×10^{23} mol/s was the lowest of any comet detected up to that point. The effective nucleus radius was calculated to be between 2.21 and 2.49 kilometers.

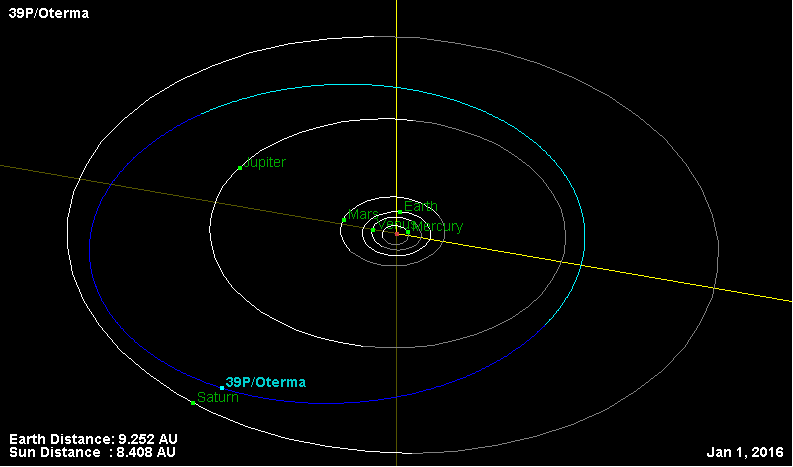
Orbit of comet 39P/Oterma on 1 January 2016

== Orbit ==
Comet 39P/Oterma currently has a centaur-like orbit contained between Jupiter and Saturn. Since the orbit is outside the frost line which is located around 3 AU from the Sun, the comet does not approach the Sun closely and is mostly an inactive comet only brightening to about apparent magnitude 22. It is classified as a Chiron-type comet with T_{Jupiter} > 3; a > a_{Jupiter}. The eccentricity of its orbit is moderate and its inclination is only a little slanted with respect to the ecliptic which allows the orbit to be perturbed by Jupiter and Saturn.

== Orbital development ==
Perihelion distance at different epochs
Epoch	Perihelion (AU)
1958	3.39
1983	5.47
2023	5.71
2042	5.91
2246	6.15

Comet 39P/Oterma is an object with a rather unstable orbit in the long run because at irregular time intervals it undergoes very close approaches to the giant planets Jupiter and Saturn that severely influence and alter its orbit. This is also the reason why no definite statements can be made concerning the long-time development of its orbital characteristics for a period of more than a couple of hundred years in the past or in the future.

Apart from relatively precise statements for a few hundred years around our epoch, further conclusions can only be drawn by the use of statistical methods. By means of the software SOLEX 11.0 by A. Vitagliano and based on the values of the currently best known orbital elements of 39P/Oterma and their uncertainties from the JPL Small Body Database, a set of 400 clones of the “mean” comet with randomly Gaussian distributed orbital elements (using their mean values and their sigma-values) was created and the orbital development of this bundle of objects with nearly identical orbits at the start epoch was calculated back in the past and forth in the future (neglecting non-gravitational effects). The result of these statistical calculations is presented in the following paragraphs.

Not much can be said about the orbit of 39P/Oterma before the 19th century. It could have been anywhere either inside the orbit of Jupiter (least probable), between the orbits of Jupiter and Saturn (most probable), or even a Saturn-crossing one. Anyhow, even if it had not been there before, with a probability of 20% a close encounter (< 2 AU) with Jupiter happened between 1815 and 1817 which brought the orbit of 39P/Oterma for a longer period in a defined orbit. Thus at least from the beginning of the 19th century till 1937 the comet's orbit was framed by Saturn's orbit on the outside and Jupiter's orbit in the inside. That means, 39P/Oterma was at this period a centaur-like object as it is today with no chance of being observed from Earth.

Following a closer approach to Jupiter of 1.44 au (215,000,000 km) on 27 March 1903, however, the comet's orbit was slightly perturbed so that its next approach to Jupiter on 27 October 1937 became an extremely close one like it probably had not happened for many centuries before. On this day, the comet approached Jupiter to only 0.165 au (24,700,000 km) and this had very peculiar consequences.

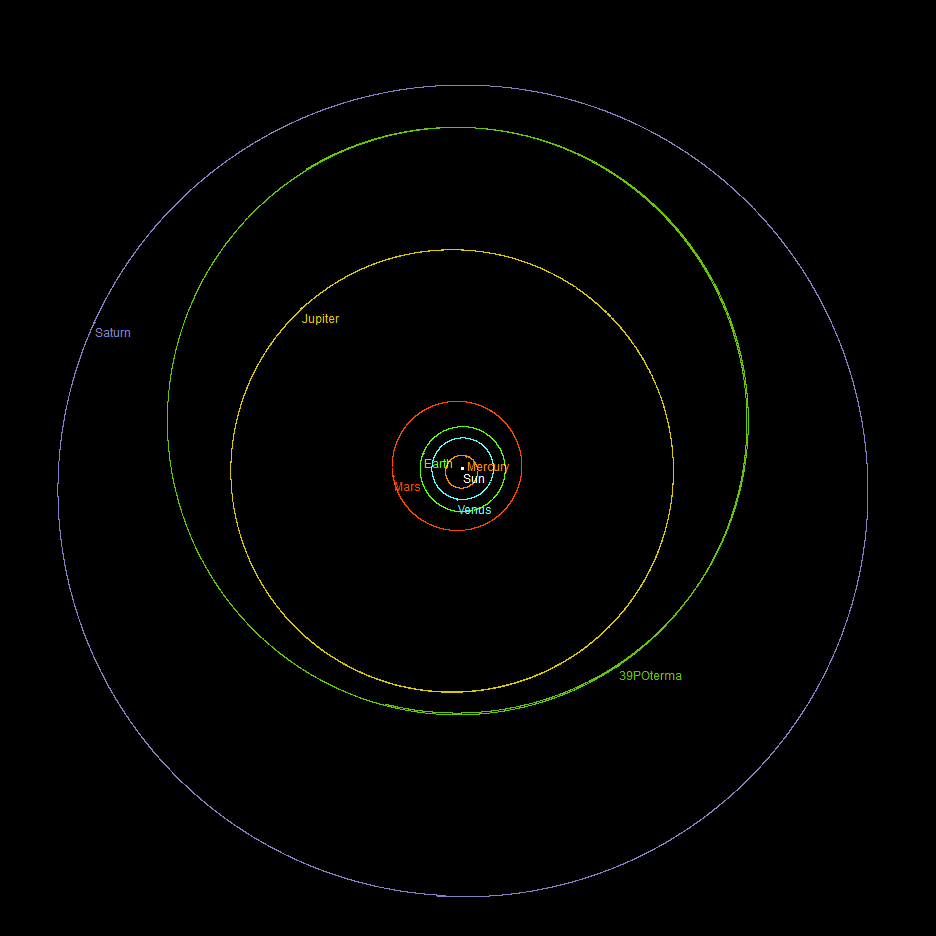
Before 1930, the orbit of 39P/Oterma was situated between the orbits of Jupiter and Saturn

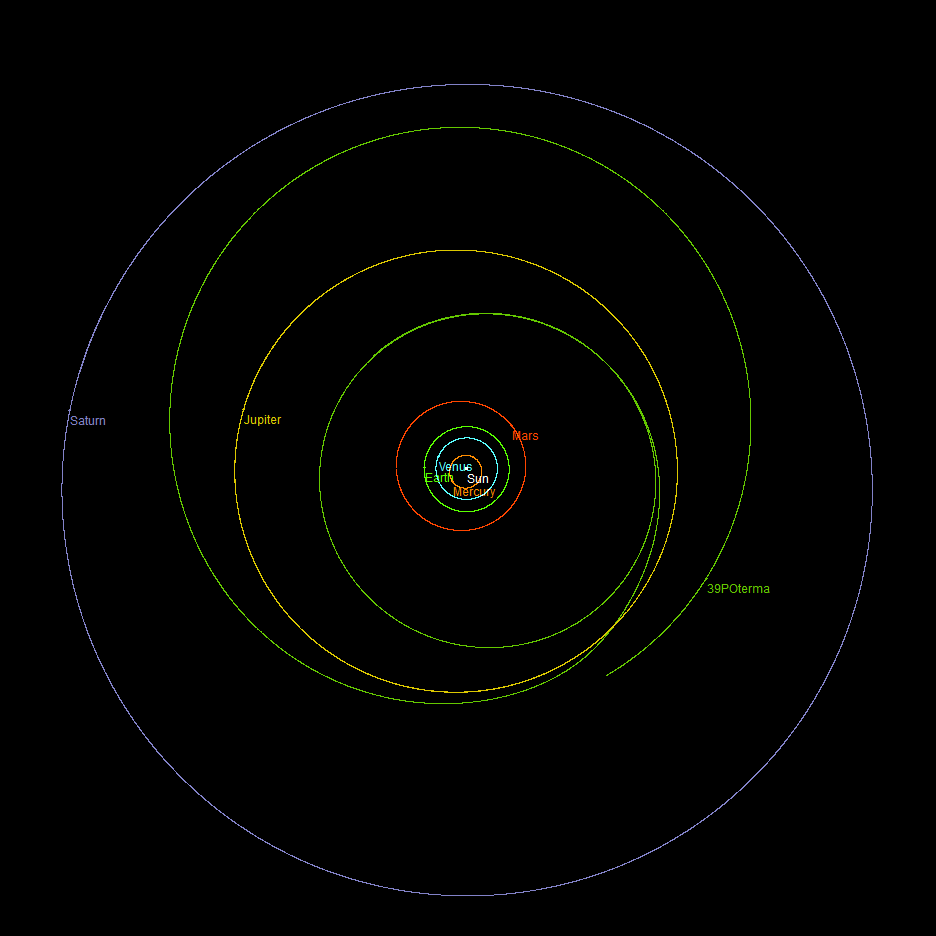
The orbit of 39P/Oterma between 1920 and 1950 shows the transition from a centaur-like orbit into a quasi-Hilda orbit

Already since the beginning of 1935, the comet was moving in an orbit nearly identical to Jupiter's with nearly the same angular velocity as the giant planet, i.e. 39P/Oterma underwent a temporary satellite capture (TSC) by Jupiter. However, this comet flew through the region near Jupiter over a rather short time, during which the comet did not complete a full revolution orbiting about the planet, instead already in the beginning of 1939 the comet could escape the planet's attraction.

However, the close encounter with Jupiter had altered the comet's orbital parameters severely. The semi-major axis was reduced from 6.9 to 4.0 AU, as the aphelion distance decreased from 8.0 to 4.5 AU, and the perihelion distance from 5.8 to 3.4 AU. Consequently, the comet's orbit had become transformed from a centaur-like orbit to one that completely lay inside the orbit of Jupiter. As the comet was now much closer to the Sun, it became active and its increased brightness combined with a closer distance from Earth gave rise to its discovery in 1943, five months after having passed its perihelion.

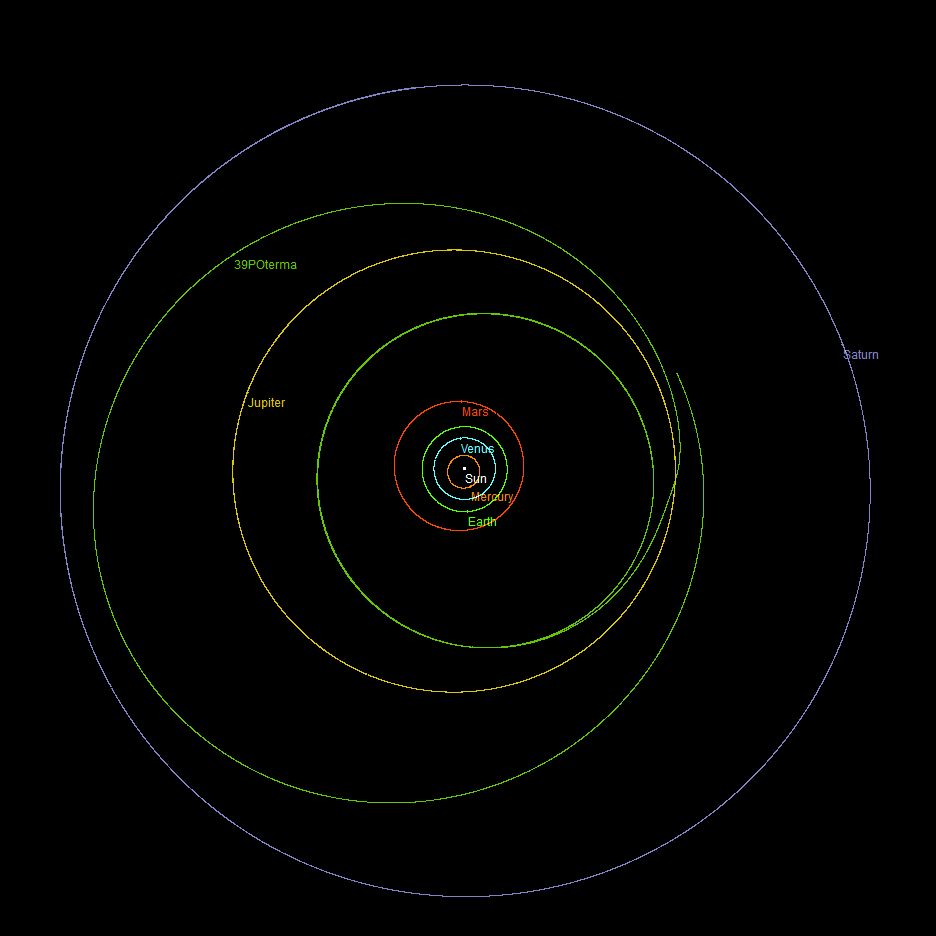
The orbit of 39P/ between 1945 and 1983 shows the transition from a quasi-Hilda orbit back to a centaur-like orbit

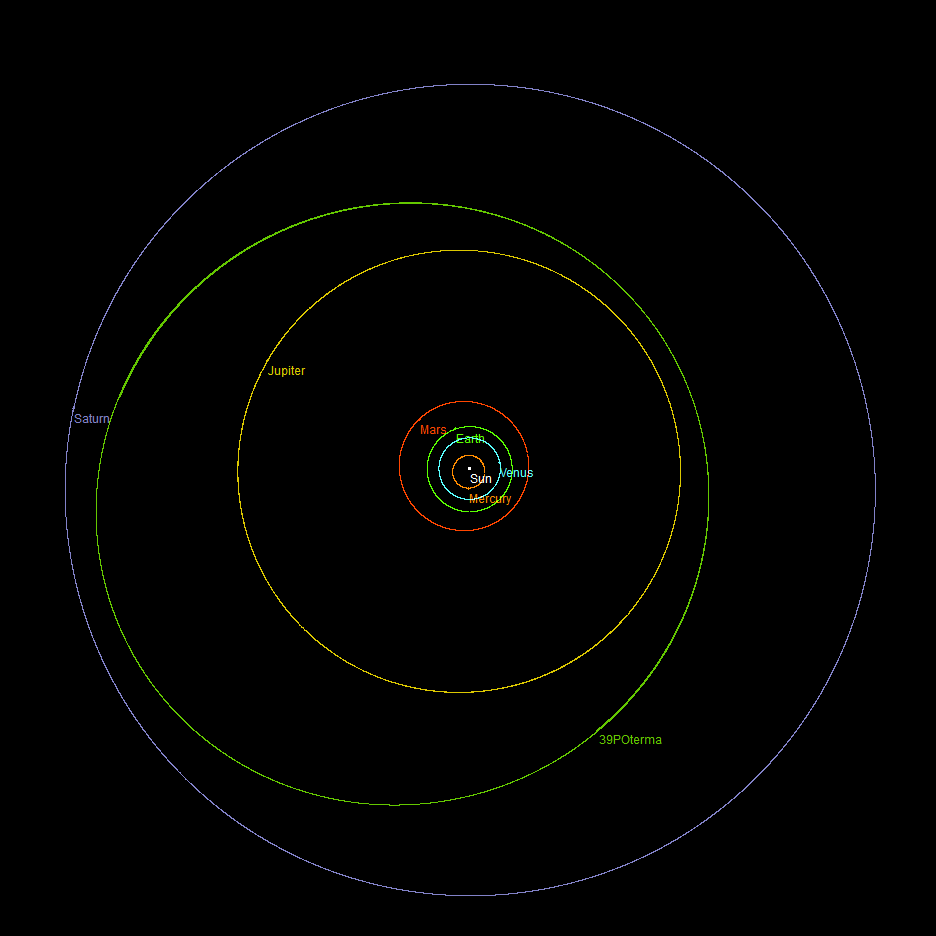
After 1980, the orbit of 39P/Oterma is situated again between the orbits of Jupiter and Saturn

As the revolution period was reduced from a little more than 18 years to 7.9 years, it was now in an exact 3:2 mean motion resonance with Jupiter. Such a Jupiter-family comet is called a “quasi-Hilda comet” (QHC) and consequently after three revolutions the comet met again with the planet. From mid-1961 till the end of 1965 the comet again went through a temporary satellite capture (TSC) by Jupiter, while on 12 April 1963 an even closer approach to the planet at a distance of only 0.095 au (14,200,000 km) occurred.

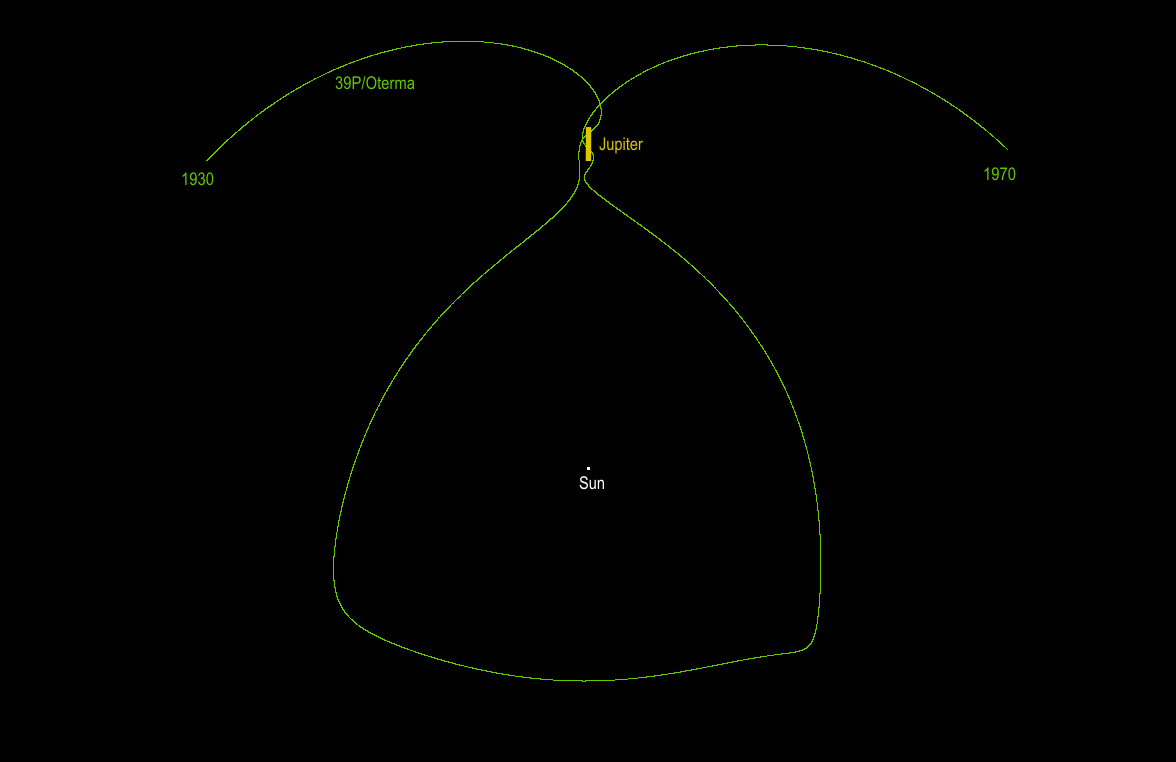
Transition of 39P/Oterma's orbit into a quasi-Hilda orbit and out of it again, displayed in a reference frame co-rotating with Jupiter (yellow streak). The phases of temporary satellite capture can be clearly seen

This led again to a transformation of the comet's orbit to an inactive centaur orbit with semi-major axis 7.2 AU, eccentricity 0.24, aphelion distance 9.0 AU, and perihelion distance 5.5 AU. The period of revolution became increased to 19.5 years. This is the current situation since the 1983 perihelion passage.

39P/Oterma closest Jupiter approach on 2025-Jan-15
Date & time of closest approach	Jupiter distance (AU)	Sun distance (AU)	Velocity wrt Jupiter (km/s)	Velocity wrt Sun (km/s)	Uncertainty region (3-sigma)	Reference
2025-Jan-15 12:56 ± 30 minutes	0.8887 AU (132.95 million km; 82.61 million mi)	5.937 AU (888.2 million km; 551.9 million mi)	0.67	13.11	± 1500 km	Horizons

And this will remain alike for quite a while. Although a couple of closer approaches to Saturn (1.015 AU on 3 June 2011 and 1.93 AU around 3 October 2168) and Jupiter (0.889 AU on 15 January 2025, 0.771 AU on 21 February 2155, and 1.17 ± 0.03 AU in May–July 2214) are going to happen, the orbit of 39P/Oterma keeps its overall characteristics at least until the beginning of the 24th century: The semi-major axis will stay in the span of 7.0 to 7.8 AU, with the perihelion distance slowly increasing to 6.1 AU while the aphelion distance stays in the range of 8.1 to 9.4 AU, i.e. the orbit is again framed by Saturn's orbit on the outside and Jupiter's orbit in the inside. The period of revolution is always between 18.3 and 21.7 years.

However, this situation is going to change subsequently to a close encounter with Saturn during the second half of the year 2312 (0.8 ± 0.1 AU). This will bring the comet's perihelion distance (reduced to 5.58 AU in 2400) in precarious vicinity to Jupiter's orbit, which will lead to a very close encounter with Jupiter between mid-2428 and the end of 2431. With a probability of 35% this approach will be closer than 1 AU sometime in 2429, but it could be even as close as 0.15 au (22,000,000 km).

The currently known data about the comet 39P/Oterma do not permit to extrapolate its fate with sufficient certainty beyond this Jupiter rendezvous because shortly after, the comet's orbital parameters will be severely altered in a wide possible range. Only probabilities can be given.

Only 10 years after the encounter with Jupiter, the comet can be found with a probability of 11.5% inside the orbit of Jupiter as a “quasi-Hilda comet“ (which would reactivate it to become more easily observed again from Earth). There is even a (very small) probability that the comet gets caught by Jupiter in a satellite capture, but more likely the comet will remain an inactive centaur-like object. A larger probability of 63% sees it continuing in an orbit between Jupiter and Saturn, but there is also a probability of 25% that the comet will become a Saturn-crosser. The orbital eccentricity may be distributed in a wide range from 0.03 to 0.44, while the inclination may be anywhere between 1.6° and 8.5°.

Numbered comets
Previous; 38P/Stephan–Oterma	39P/Oterma	Next; 40P/Väisälä
