= Ian Glass =

Astronomer

Ian Stewart Glass (born 5 September 1939 in Dublin, Ireland) is an infrared astronomer and scientific historian living in Cape Town, South Africa.

== Education ==
Glass was educated at Trinity College Dublin where he was a Foundation Scholar. He obtained his B.A. with first class honours in 1961 and was awarded the Hackett Prize for first place in Natural Sciences. He received his PhD in Physics from the Massachusetts Institute of Technology in 1968 for work in x-ray astronomy under George W. Clark.

== Infrared astronomy ==
Since 1970 he has worked in infrared astronomy and instrumentation and he has written the standard textbook on the subject. He worked before 1975 at the Royal Greenwich Observatory and thereafter at the South African Astronomical Observatory.

He is the author or co-author of over 220 scientific papers in journals and conference proceedings and has been cited over 11000 times with h-index=60.

With Tom Lloyd-Evans, he discovered the period–luminosity relation followed by Mira variable stars. This result has subsequently been refined. Later observations of the Miras in the SgrI Baade's Window field led to an independent estimate of the distance to the Galactic Centre.

In 1973 Feast and Glass discovered the infrared/optical counterpart of the symbiotic binary x-ray source GX1+4. In 1978 Glass located the obscured x-ray source Cir X-1 in the infrared and found that it flared in a cyclic manner associated with its 16.6-day x-ray period.

The role of hot dust in the emission from a Seyfert galaxy (Fairall 9) was demonstrated observationally for the first time by Clavel, Wamsteker and Glass in 1989; These observations were modelled theoretically by Barvainis and provided a strong confirmation of the reverberation model for active galactic nuclei. The photometry was part of a multi-year monitoring programme that showed the ubiquity of infrared variability in these objects.

Work with the ISO satellite and MACHO data showed that all late-type M giant stars exhibit mass-loss and are variable.

The most detailed image of the Galactic Centre (inner Bulge) region before the advent of array detectors was obtained with Catchpole and Whitelock in 1987, showing up extinction patterns that correlated with the intervening molecular clouds.

== History of astronomy ==
In addition to papers on a number of historical themes, Glass has written several books (see below):

"Victorian Telescope Makers" was inspired by the extensive correspondence between Sir David Gill and the Irish telescope maker Sir Howard Grubb that survives at the South African Astronomical Observatory.

"Revolutionaries of the Cosmos" deals with eight figures (Galileo, Newton, Herschel, Huggins, Hale, Shapley, Eddington and Hubble) who revolutionised physical astronomy through the introduction of radical new ideas and techniques.

"Nicolas-Louis de La Caille" concerns the leading observational astronomer of the mid-eighteenth century who was also the first important scientist to visit what is now South Africa (1751–53). Inter alia, he conducted the first telescope sky survey, was a devotee of Newtonian dynamics and a pioneer of the Lunar method of navigation.

"Grubb Dublin and Grubb Parsons" relates the history of the telescope company founded in Dublin ca 1830 and located in more recent years at Newcastle upon Tyne, before its closure in 1985.

== Honours, etc ==
Glass received the Gill Medal of the Astronomical Society of Southern Africa in 1999 for his work in the infrared and their McIntyre Award in 2003 for his book on the Grubb Telescope Company (see below).

He is a member of the Royal Society of South Africa, and the International Astronomical Union. He has twice been elected president of the Astronomical Society of Southern Africa and in 2016 was made an honorary member thereof.

In 1984–89 he was editor of "Monthly Notes of the Astronomical Society of Southern Africa".

He has been a visiting professor at the National Astronomical Observatory of Japan (Nobeyama and Tokyo), an associate of the European Southern Observatory and has worked for various periods at the California Institute of Technology, the University of Arizona, the Institut d'astrophysique de Paris (France), the Observatoire de Besançon, the Institute of Astronomy, Cambridge (UK) and the Physical Research Laboratory, Ahmedabad (India). He has also been an adjunct professor at James Cook University, Queensland, Australia.

== Books ==
- Glass, I.S. (1997) Victorian Telescope Makers: the Lives and Letters of Thomas and Howard Grubb, Institute of Physics Publishing, Bristol and Philadelphia ISBN 0-7503-0454-5.
- Glass, I.S. (1999) Handbook of Infrared Astronomy, Cambridge University Press, Cambridge ISBN 0-521-63311-7.
- Glass, I.S. (2006) Revolutionaries of the Cosmos – the Astrophysicists, Oxford University Press, Oxford, ISBN 0-19-857099-6.
- Glass, I.S. (2008) Proxima: The Nearest Star (other than the Sun), Mons Mensa, Cape Town (self-published), ISBN 978-0-9814126-0-3.
- Glass, I.S. (2013) Nicolas-Louis de La Caille – Astronomer and Geodesist, Oxford University Press, Oxford, ISBN 978-0-19-966840-3. French edition translated by James Lequeux, EDP Sciences (ISBN 978-2-7598-0999-8) and Observatoire de Paris (ISBN 978-2-901057-68-0.
- Glass, I.S. (2015) The Royal Observatory at the Cape of Good Hope: History and Heritage, Mons Mensa, Cape Town (self-published). Available as pdf, free, from CfAH.org.za/resources/rocgh-glass. ISBN 978-0-9814126-2-7.
- Glass, I.S. (2026) Grubb Dublin and Grubb Parsons, Mons Mensa, Cape Town (Self Published). Available as pdf, free, from CfAH.org.za/resources/grubb-glass.
