= John Caister Bennett =

South African amateur astronomer

John Caister "Jack" Bennett (born 6 April 1914 in Estcourt, Natal, died 30 May 1990 in Pretoria), was a South African civil servant and amateur astronomer.

== Life ==
Bennett's mother was British, and his father was from Tasmania. He attended school in Ficksburg and began to work in public service after graduating in 1934, initially in the forestry administration in Elgin, before moving to the administration of Transvaal Province in Pretoria. During World War II, he served as a soldier in South Africa, Egypt and Italy. In 1974, he retired from the public service. From 1985, he began to suffer from arthritis, and soon afterwards his health deteriorated so much that he had to sell his house in Pretoria's Riviera neighborhood and move into a nursing home. He died on 30 May 1990 at the age of 76.

== Amateur astronomer ==
Bennett's interest in astronomy began early when his mother showed him the starry sky with the Southern Cross and the planets on the way home from evening church visits and told him about her observation of Halley's Comet on its return in 1910.

After the war he started looking for comets with a 60 mm refractor, and from 1958 he observed the new artificial satellites. For this purpose, he bought a light 125 mm refractor with an altazimuth mount in 1961, which later became his favorite instrument. He became a member of the Astronomical Society of Southern Africa and the British Astronomical Association at an early age.

Although he discovered comets as early as the 1960s, he was either not the first discoverer, or the comets he found were short-lived and could not be observed again. During this time (1969 to 1974) he systematically compiled a catalog of 152 objects in the southern sky that could be mistaken for a comet. This list, later called the Bennett Catalogue, is still today a valuable aid for comet hunters, a "southern Messier catalogue".

Every year he spent some 150 hours looking for comets in the backyard of his house in Pretoria and by chance discovered on 16 July 1968 an unusual appearance in the galaxy Messier 83 (NGC 5236) in the constellation Hydra. This was recognized shortly afterwards by professional astronomers as a supernova (SN 1968L). Bennett was the first person to visually discover a supernova since the invention of the telescope.

With his 125 mm refractor he finally discovered his first comet, C/1969 Y1 (Bennett), after a search for more than 333 hours on 28 December 1969. This became a "Great Comet" that could be seen with the naked eye the following year. His second comet discovery occurred on 13 November 1974 after a further 482 hours of search. This was the inconspicuous C/1974 V2 (Bennett).

In later years he bought a Celestron C8, but despite 30 to 40 hours of searching annually for the next 10 years, he had no further success in hunting comets, partially due to increasing light pollution. In addition to comets, he was also interested in meteors and variable stars. In the years before his death, he had to give up observing entirely and donated his famous 125 mm refractor to the University of South Africa.

== Discoveries ==
- Supernova SN 1968L in the galaxy M83, 16 July 1968
- C/1969 Y1, 28 December 1969
- C/1974 V2, 13 November 1974

== Honors ==
- 1968–1969: President of the Astronomical Society of Southern Africa (ASSA)
- 1968–1985: Director of the Comet & Meteor Section of ASSA
- 1970: ASSA's Gill Medal for achievements in astronomy with special consideration of achievements in South Africa
- 1971: Merlin Medal of the British Astronomical Association (BAA)
- 1974: Fellow of the Royal Astronomical Society
- 1975–1987: Director of ASSA's Nova Search Section
- 1976: Nova Award from the American Association of Variable Star Observers (AAVSO), Cambridge, Massachusetts, for his discovery of the supernova SN 1968L
- 1977: The new observatory and 32 cm telescope at ASSA's Pretoria Center are named for Jack Bennett
- 1986: Master of Science (h. C.) From Witwatersrand University
- 1989: Honorary member of the Astronomical Society of Southern Africa
- 1989: An asteroid discovered in 1986 in the main belt is given the official designation (4093) Bennett after John C. Bennett.

After his death, the Pretoria Centre established the ASSA's annual Jack Bennett Award for contributions to astronomy and the Centre.
