= Astyalus =

Ancient Greek male given name

In Greek mythology, Astyalus (Ancient Greek: Ἀστύαλος, romanized: Astýalos, lit. 'one who rushes upon the city', 'leaping against the city' or 'insatiable for the city'), also called, Astylus (Ancient Greek: Ἄστυλος or Ἀστύλος, romanized: Astylos or Astulo, lit. 'without a pillar' or 'without support') may refer to two distinct characters:

- Astylus, a prophetic centaur who tried to warn his fellow centaurs against fighting the Lapiths at the wedding of Pirithous. He also advised the centaur Nessus not to flee from Heracles, accurately predicting that Nessus is destined to die by Heracles's poisoned arrows later on. But the name in Ovid seems to be a mistake either of the poet himself or of the transcribers for Asbolus, another well–known centaur seer.
- Astyalus, a Trojan warrior who fought in the Trojan War. He was slain in battle by the Lapith leader Polypoetes.
