= P/2020 MK4 (PanSTARRS) =

Centaur exhibiting cometary activity

P/2020 MK_{4} (PanSTARRS)
Discovery
- Discovered by: Pan-STARRS 1
- Discovery site: Haleakala Observatory
- Discovery date: 24 June 2020

Designations
- Minor planet category: Chiron-type comet centaur

Orbital characteristics
- Epoch 17 December 2020 (JD 2459200.5)
- Uncertainty parameter 4
- Observation arc: 857 days (2.348 years)
- Aphelion: 6.254 AU
- Perihelion: 6.025 AU
- Semi-major axis: 6.145 AU
- Eccentricity: 0.01952
- Orbital period (sidereal): 15.23 years
- Mean anomaly: 138.7°
- Mean motion: 0° 3^{m} 52.917^{s} / day
- Inclination: 6.723°
- Longitude of ascending node: 1.446°
- Argument of perihelion: 164.5°
- Earth MOID: 5.031 AU
- Jupiter MOID: 0.578 AU
- T_{Jupiter}: 3.005

Physical characteristics
- Mean diameter: 2.2 km (1.4 mi)
- Geometric albedo: 0.04–0.1 (assumed)
- Spectral type: (g–r) = 0.42±0.04; (r–i) = 0.17±0.04
- Absolute magnitude (H): 11.3±0.03

P/2020 MK_{4} (PanSTARRS) is a Chiron-type comet or active centaur orbiting in the outer Solar System between Jupiter and Saturn. It was discovered on 24 June 2020, by the Pan-STARRS survey at Haleakala Observatory in Hawaii, United States.

== Physical characteristics ==
=== Size ===
A lower limit for the absolute magnitude of the nucleus is H_{g} = 11.30±0.03 that, for an albedo in the range 0.1—0.04, gives an upper limit for its size in the interval 23–37 km. However, a follow-up study in 2022 showed that the size of its nucleus is much smaller, at only 2.2 km (1.4 mi) in diameter.

=== Colors ===
The comet's color indices, (g′–r′) = 0.42±0.04 and (r′–i′) = 0.17±0.04, indicates the comet's nucleus has a neutral or gray color.

=== Activity ===
P/2020 MK_{4} was discovered in outburst state and by late 2020, it had returned to its regular brightness. It was recovered by the Lowell Discovery Telescope at an extremely faint apparent magnitude of 24.5 in September 2022. It was officially recognized as a comet by the Minor Planet Center on 20 November 2022, in which it was given the periodic comet designation P/2020 MK_{4}.

== Orbital evolution ==
Centaurs have short dynamical lives due to strong interactions with the giant planets. P/2020 MK_{4} follows a very chaotic orbital evolution that may lead it to be ejected from the Solar System during the next 200,000 years. Extensive numerical simulations indicate that P/2020 MK_{4} may have experienced relatively close flybys with comet 29P/Schwassmann–Wachmann, in some cases with one of both objects were transient Jovian satellites; during these events, P/2020 MK_{4} may have crossed the coma of comet 29P when in outburst.

== See also ==
- List of centaurs (small Solar System bodies) § 2020 MK4
