= C/1968 H1 (Tago–Honda–Yamamoto) =

Non-periodic comet

Discovery
- Discovered by: Akihiko Tago; Minoru Honda; Hirofumi Yamamoto
- Discovery site: Japan
- Discovery date: 1 May 1968

Designations
- Alternative designations: 1968 IV, 1968a

Orbital characteristics
- Epoch: 17 May 1968 (JD 2439993.5)
- Observation arc: 32 days
- Earliest precovery date: 25 April 1968
- Number of observations: 35
- Aphelion: 358.941 AU
- Perihelion: 0.6804 AU
- Semi-major axis: 179.811 AU
- Eccentricity: 0.99622
- Orbital period: 2,411 years
- Inclination: 102.170°
- Longitude of ascending node: 233.108°
- Argument of periapsis: 50.447°
- Last perihelion: 16 May 1968
- T_{Jupiter}: –0.186
- Earth MOID: 0.1635 AU
- Jupiter MOID: 0.5021 AU

Physical characteristics
- Mean radius: 0.423 km (0.263 mi) (Note: Calculated mean radius using the formula: $\log_{10}\,(\,R\,)\ =\;0.9 +\;0.13 (\,H\,)$ Where $\,H\,$ is the comet's absolute total magnitude (M1))
- Comet total magnitude (M1): 9.8
- Apparent magnitude: 7.0 (1968 apparition)

Comet Tago–Honda–Yamamoto, formally designated C/1968 H1, is a retrograde non-periodic comet discovered by Akihiko Tago, Minoru Honda, and Hirofumi Yamamoto on 1 May 1968. Although officially named after the three Japanese astronomers, it was actually first spotted by Kōichi Itagaki about five days earlier on 25 April 1968, however he could not report his sighting for another couple of weeks.

== Discovery and observations ==
Japanese amateur astronomer Kōichi Itagaki, a resident of Yamagata, was the first person to spot the comet on 25 April 1968, at the time a 7th-magnitude object located near the Andromeda Galaxy. Akihiko Tago, Minoru Honda and Hirofumi Yamamoto made independent observations of the comet on April 30 and reported their findings to the Tokyo Astronomical Observatory the following day.

C/1968 H1 made its closest approach to Earth on 26 April 1968 at a distance of 0.33 AU (49 million km; 31 million mi). The comet then rapidly declined in brightness as it began its outbound flight back to the outer Solar System. Despite the bright moonlight conditions, M. J. Gainsford managed to observe the comet on May 12, noting that the comet had faded to magnitude 8.75. It was last seen on the evening of 5 June 1968.

== See also ==
- C/1969 T1 (Tago–Sato–Kosaka)
