= 55576 Amycus =

Centaur

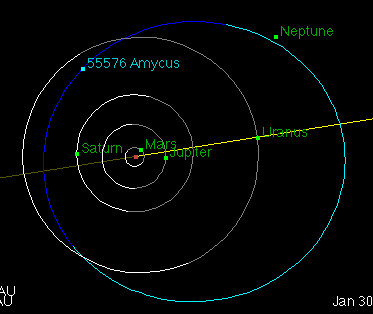
- Orbital diagram (top view)

Discovery
- Discovered by: NEAT
- Discovery site: Palomar
- Discovery date: 8 April 2002

Designations
- Pronunciation: /ˈæmɪkəs/
- Named after: Amycus
- Alternative designations: 2002 GB_{10}
- Minor planet category: Centaur
- Adjectives: Amycian /əˈmɪsiən/
- Symbol: (astrological)

Orbital characteristics
- Epoch 13 January 2016 (JD 2457400.5)
- Uncertainty parameter 2
- Observation arc: 7204 days (19.72 yr)
- Aphelion: 35.019 AU (5.2388 Tm) (Q)
- Perihelion: 15.178 AU (2.2706 Tm) (q)
- Semi-major axis: 25.098 AU (3.7546 Tm) (a)
- Eccentricity: 0.39526 (e)
- Orbital period (sidereal): 125.74 yr (45926.7 d)
- Mean anomaly: 37.041° (M)
- Mean motion: 0° 0^{m} 28.219^{s} / day (n)
- Inclination: 13.352° (i)
- Longitude of ascending node: 315.45° (Ω)
- Argument of perihelion: 239.17° (ω)
- Jupiter MOID: 9.92261 AU (1.484401 Tm)
- T_{Jupiter}: 4.133

Physical characteristics
- Dimensions: 76.3±12.5 km
- Synodic rotation period: 9.76 h (0.407 d)
- Geometric albedo: ~ 0.18
- Spectral type: B–V = 1.111±0.034; V–R = 0.705±0.032
- Apparent magnitude: ~ 20
- Absolute magnitude (H): 7.8

55576 Amycus /ˈæmɪkəs/ is a centaur discovered on 8 April 2002 by the NEAT at Palomar. The minor planet was named for Amycus, a male centaur in Greek mythology.

Amycus came to perihelion in February 2003. Data from the Spitzer Space Telescope gave a diameter of 76.3±12.5 km. A low probability asteroid occultation of star UCAC2 17967364 with an apparent magnitude of +13.8 was possible on 11 February 2009. Another such event involving a star with an apparent magnitude of +12.9 occurred on 10 April 2014 at about 10:46 Universal Time, visible for observers in the southwest US and western Mexico.

== Orbit ==
=== Near 3:4 resonance of Uranus ===
Amycus lies within 0.009 AU of the 3:4 resonance of Uranus and is estimated to have a long orbital half-life of about 11.1 Myr.

The failed libration (resonance motion) of Amycus.

== Physical characteristics ==
=== Size and color ===
Comparison of sizes, albedos, and colors of various large centaurs with measured diameters. Amycus is shown in the middle row, third from right.

Amycus has a measured diameter of about 76.3±12.5 km and a relatively high albedo of 0.18. The B–V color index of Amycus is approximately 1.111±0.034.

== See also ==
- List of centaurs (small Solar System bodies) § 55576
- List of Solar System objects by size
