= William Stephen Finsen =

South African astronomer

- Born: 28 July 1905; Johannesburg, Transvaal Colony
- Died: 16 May 1979 (aged 73); Johannesburg, South Africa
- Education: University of Cape Town
- Known for: Finsen eyepiece interferometer
- Spouse: Gertrude Ada Camerer (m.1928)
- Scientific career
- Fields: Astronomy
- Workplaces: Union Observatory, South Africa

William Stephen Finsen FRAS (28 July 1905 – 16 May 1979) was a South African astronomer. He discovered a number of double stars and took many photographs of Mars. He developed the Finsen eyepiece interferometer to measure very close double stars. He was the final director of Union Observatory in South Africa from 1957 to 1965 (it was renamed Republic Observatory in 1961).

== Biography ==
Finsen was born in 1905 in Johannesburg, Transvaal Colony to Danish parents John Valgard Finsen & Marie Finsen (née Jensen). He was the nephew of the Nobel Prize winner Niels Ryberg Finsen. He obtained a DSc in Astronomy from the University of Cape Town and spent almost 50 years working at the Union Observatory in Johannesburg. He succeeded Willem Hendrik van den Bos as director of the observatory from 1957 to 1965, during which time it changed name to the Republic Observatory (1961).

Both Finsen and van den Bos were vocally opposed to South African government's plan to close and amalgamate the Republic Observatory with the Cape Observatory (Cape Town) and the Radcliffe Observatory (Pretoria) into the South African Astronomical Observatory at Sutherland, Northern Cape in 1974, as they feared it would lead to termination of the well-established programmes of observation of binary stars and asteroids. Their fears would later be proven correct as those programmes were terminated.

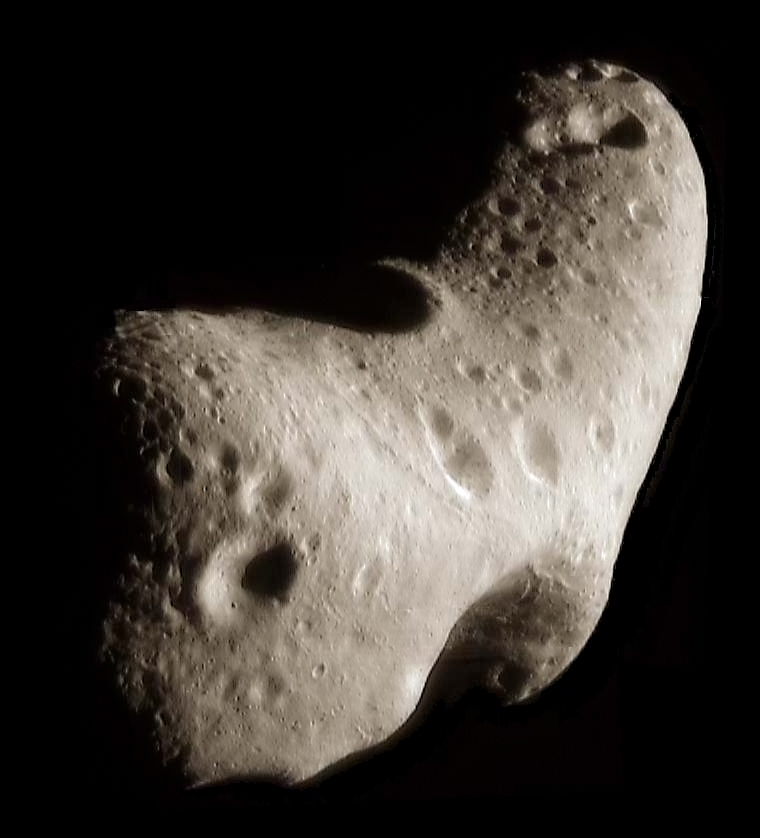
Asteroid 433 Eros

Finsen invented an eyepiece interferometer which allowed measurement of very close double stars. His original device was used for many years at the astronomy department of the University of South Africa. Finsen examined more than 8 000 stars, discovered 73 double stars and took 54 000 photographs of Mars. They were considered the best photographs of Mars prior to the first space probe pictures in 1965. Finsen continued his observations of double stars after his official retirement from the observatory.

During the second world war Finsen produced some basic films on astronomy which were used to train navigators. He also designed the Finsen Sun Compass to be used by armoured vehicle drivers in the desert campaigns. The standard magnetic compasses were useless owing to the large amount of metal in the vehicles.

Finsen also developed a stomach contents sampler at the request of a specialist physician. Shaped like a pill, once swallowed the small device would open inside the patient's stomach after a pre-determined time and sample the stomach contents.

=== Tweedledee and Tweedledum ===
Φ 332 (Finsen 332) is a tiny and difficult double-double star at 18:45 / +5°30', named Tweedledee and Tweedledum by Finsen, who was, by the time of his 1953 discovery, struck by the nearly identical position angles and separations of it.

== Membership, awards and recognition ==
- The asteroid 1794 Finsen is named after him. Finsen first observed the asteroid in 1937.
- The geological feature Finsen Dorsum on the asteroid 433 Eros is named after him. Finsen had detected Eros' elongated shape.
- President of the ASSA 1949–1950
- Awarded the Gill Medal in 1967.
- Fellow of the Royal Astronomical Society – proposed in 1925 by Robert T. A. Innes
