= 37P/Forbes =

Jupiter-family comet

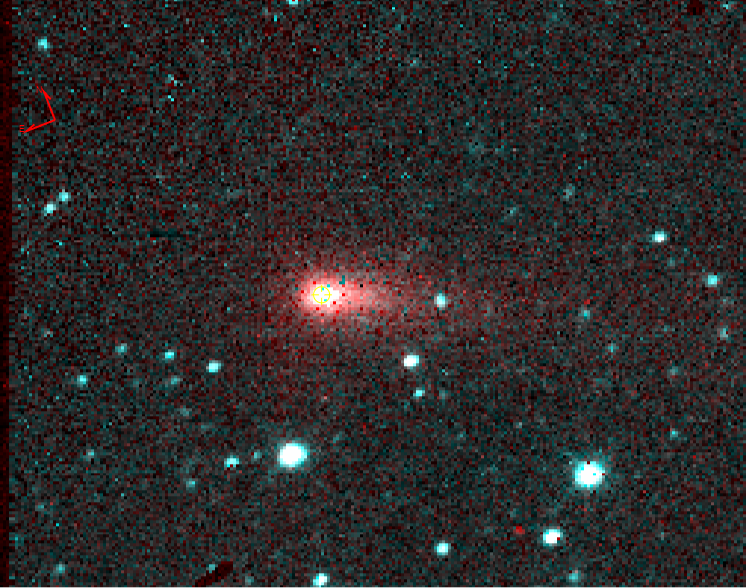
- Infrared image of Comet Forbes taken by the NEOWISE spacecraft on 27 May 2018

Discovery
- Discovered by: Alexander F. I. Forbes
- Discovery site: Rosebank, South Africa
- Discovery date: 1 August 1929

Designations
- MPC designation: P/1929 P1, P/1942 L1
- Alternative designations: 1929 II, 1942 III, 1948 VIII; 1961 VI, 1974 IX, 1980 VI; 1987 I, 1993 IV

Orbital characteristics
- Epoch: 21 November 2025 (JD 2461000.5)
- Observation arc: 96.28 years
- Number of observations: 2,487
- Aphelion: 5.305 AU
- Perihelion: 1.618 AU
- Semi-major axis: 3.462 AU
- Eccentricity: 0.53255
- Orbital period: 6.44 years
- Inclination: 8.948°
- Longitude of ascending node: 314.55°
- Argument of periapsis: 330.07°
- Mean anomaly: 62.099°
- Last perihelion: 11 October 2024
- Next perihelion: 19 March 2031
- T_{Jupiter}: 2.866
- Earth MOID: 0.602 AU
- Jupiter MOID: 0.228 AU

Physical characteristics
- Mean radius: 0.81 km (0.50 mi)
- Mean density: 560±80 kg/m^{3}
- Spectral type: (V–R) = 0.29±0.03; (R–I) = 0.66±0.06
- Comet total magnitude (M1): 9.6
- Comet nuclear magnitude (M2): 15.4

37P/Forbes is a periodic comet in the Solar System. The orbit of this comet passes close to the planet Jupiter however it orbit changes frequently. It was discovered on August 1, 1929, by Alexander F. I. Forbes in South Africa. The comet nucleus is estimated to be 1.62 km (1.01 mi) in diameter.

A close approach to Jupiter in the year 2001 has changes its perihelion to 1.57 AU. Despite the small change, the comet brightness went down by a magnitude of 2.

Numbered comets
Previous; 36P/Whipple	37P/Forbes	Next; 38P/Stephan–Oterma
