= Zdenek Sekanina =

Czech-American astronomer

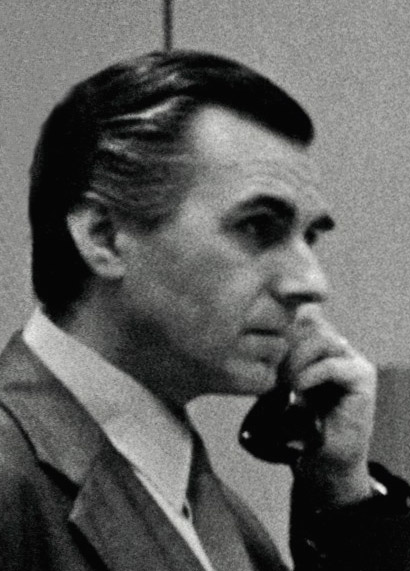
Zdeněk Sekanina in 1974

Zdeněk Sekanina (born 12 June 1936) is a Czech-American astronomer and scientist.

In 1959, Sekanina studied astronomy at Charles University in Prague, where he graduated in 1963. After the Soviet invasion of Czechoslovakia in 1968, he emigrated to the United States. Since 1980, he has been working at the Jet Propulsion Laboratory.

His main areas of professional study are meteors and interplanetary dust as well as the study of comets. During the course of his investigations, he dealt with Halley's Comet, the Tunguska event, as well as the break-up and impact of Comet Shoemaker–Levy 9 on Jupiter.

He was involved in the data evaluation of the Giotto, Stardust, and Solar and Heliospheric Observatory missions.

The asteroid 1913 Sekanina was named after him.
