= Centaur (small Solar System body) =

Type of Solar System object

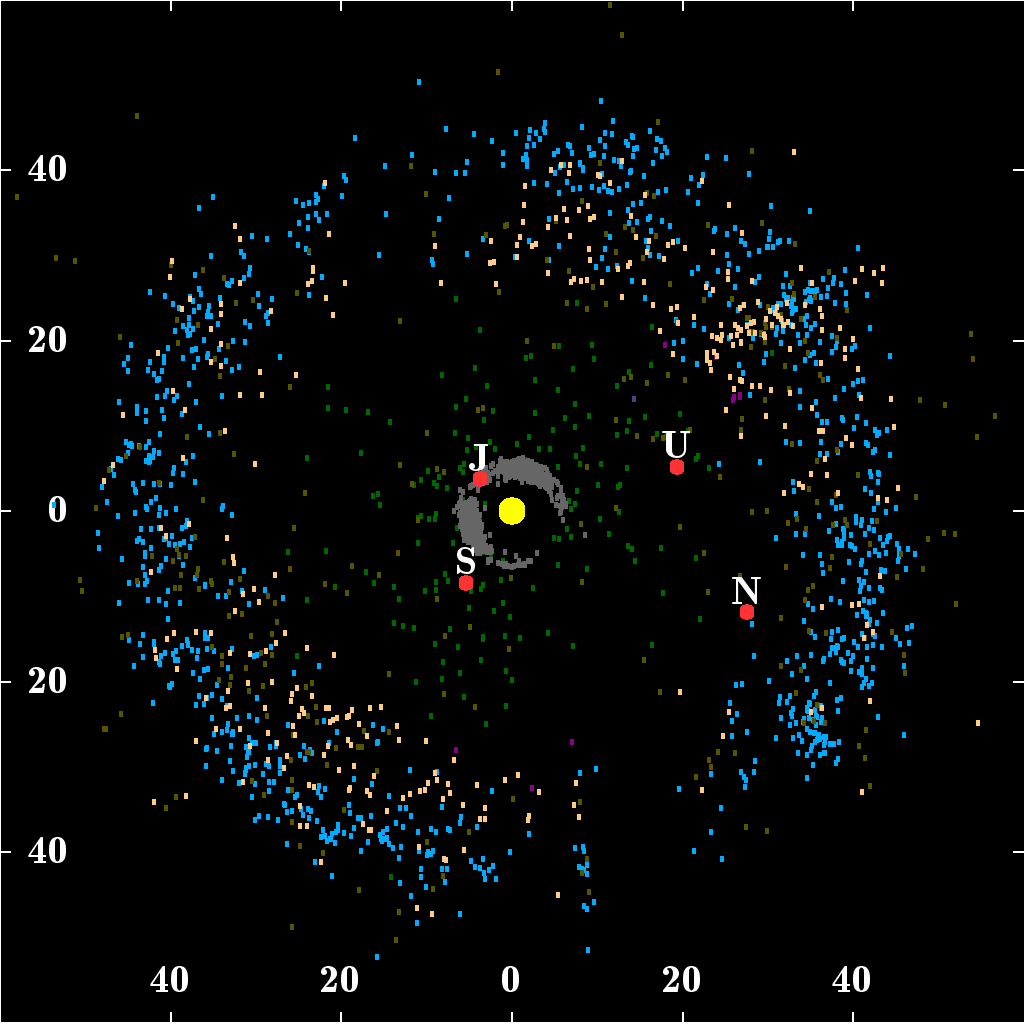
Positions of known outer Solar System objects as of 2017. The centaurs orbit generally inwards of the Kuiper belt and outside the Jupiter trojans.: Sun; Jupiter trojans (6,178); Scattered disc (>300) Neptune trojans (9) / Giant planets: · Jupiter (J) · Saturn (S) · Uranus (U) · Neptune (N); Centaurs (44,000); Kuiper belt (>100,000); (scale in AU; epoch as of January 2015; # of objects in parentheses)

In planetary astronomy, a centaur is a small Solar System body that orbits the Sun between Jupiter and Neptune and crosses the orbits of one or more of the giant planets. Centaurs generally have unstable orbits because of this; almost all of their orbits have dynamic lifetimes of only a few million years, but there is one known centaur, 514107 Kaʻepaokaʻāwela, whose orbit may be stable (though retrograde). (Note: For criticism of this idea see:) Centaurs typically exhibit the characteristics of both asteroids and comets. They are named after the mythological centaurs that were a mixture of horse and human. Observational bias toward large objects makes determination of the total centaur population difficult. Estimates for the number of centaurs in the Solar System more than 1 km in diameter range from as low as 44,000 to more than 10,000,000.

The first centaur to be discovered, under the definition of the Jet Propulsion Laboratory and the one used here, was 944 Hidalgo in 1920. However, they were not recognized as a distinct population until the discovery of 2060 Chiron in 1977. The largest confirmed centaur is 10199 Chariklo, which at 250 kilometers in diameter is as big as a mid-sized main-belt asteroid, and is known to have a system of rings. It was discovered in 1997.

No centaur has been photographed up close, although there is evidence that Saturn's moon Phoebe, imaged by the Cassini probe in 2004, may be a captured centaur that originated in the Kuiper belt. In addition, the Hubble Space Telescope has gleaned some information about the surface features of 8405 Asbolus.

Ceres may have originated in the region of the outer planets, and if so might be considered an ex-centaur, but the centaurs seen today all originated elsewhere.

Of the objects known to occupy centaur-like orbits, approximately 30 have been found to display comet-like dust comas, with three, 2060 Chiron, 60558 Echeclus, and 29P/Schwassmann–Wachmann 1, having detectable levels of volatile production in orbits entirely beyond Jupiter. Chiron and Echeclus are therefore classified as both centaurs and comets, while Schwassmann-Wachmann 1 has always held a comet designation. Other centaurs, such as 52872 Okyrhoe, are suspected of having shown comas. Any centaur that is perturbed close enough to the Sun is expected to become a comet.

== Classification ==
A centaur has either a perihelion or a semi-major axis between those of the outer planets (between Jupiter and Neptune). Due to the inherent long-term instability of orbits in this region, even centaurs such as 2000 GM_{137} and 2001 XZ_{255}, which do not currently cross the orbit of any planet, are in gradually changing orbits that will be perturbed until they start to cross the orbit of one or more of the giant planets. Some astronomers count only bodies with semimajor axes in the region of the outer planets to be centaurs; others accept any body with a perihelion in the region, as their orbits are similarly unstable.

=== Discrepant criteria ===
However, different institutions have different criteria for classifying borderline objects, based on particular values of their orbital elements:

- The Minor Planet Center (MPC) defines centaurs as having a perihelion beyond the orbit of Jupiter (5.2 AU < q) and a semi-major axis less than that of Neptune (a < 30.1 AU). The MPC sometimes lists centaurs and scattered disc objects together as a single group.
- The Jet Propulsion Laboratory (JPL) similarly defines centaurs as having a semi-major axis, a, between those of Jupiter and Neptune (5.5 AU ≤ a ≤ 30.1 AU).
- In contrast, the Deep Ecliptic Survey (DES) defines centaurs using a dynamical classification scheme. These classifications are based on the simulated change in behavior of the present orbit when extended over 10 million years. The DES defines centaurs as non-resonant objects whose instantaneous (osculating) perihelia are less than the osculating semi-major axis of Neptune at any time during the simulation. This definition is intended to be synonymous with planet-crossing orbits and to suggest comparatively short lifetimes in the current orbit.
- The collection The Solar System Beyond Neptune (2008) defines objects with a semi-major axis between those of Jupiter and Neptune and a Jupiter-relative Tisserand's parameter above 3.05 as centaurs, classifying the objects with a Jupiter-relative Tisserand's parameter below this and, to exclude Kuiper belt objects, an arbitrary perihelion cut-off half-way to Saturn (q ≤ 7.35 AU) as Jupiter-family comets, and classifying those objects on unstable orbits with a semi-major axis larger than Neptune's as members of the scattered disc.
- Other astronomers prefer to define centaurs as objects that are non-resonant with a perihelion inside the orbit of Neptune that can be shown to likely cross the Hill sphere of a gas giant within the next 10 million years, so that centaurs can be thought of as objects scattered inwards and that interact more strongly and scatter more quickly than typical scattered-disc objects.
- The JPL Small-Body Database lists 910 centaurs. There are an additional 223 trans-Neptunian objects (objects with a semi-major axis further than Neptune's, i.e. 30.1 AU ≤ a) with a perihelion closer than the orbit of Uranus (q ≤ 19.2 AU).

=== Ambiguous objects ===
The Gladman & Marsden (2008) criteria would make some objects Jupiter-family comets: Both Echeclus (q = 5.8 AU, T_{J} = 3.03) and Okyrhoe (q = 5.8 AU; T_{J} = 2.95) have traditionally been classified as centaurs. Traditionally considered an asteroid, but classified as a centaur by JPL, Hidalgo (q = 1.95 AU; T_{J} = 2.07) would also change category to a Jupiter-family comet. 29P/Schwassmann–Wachmann (q = 5.72 AU; T_{J} = 2.99) has been categorized as both a centaur and a Jupiter-family comet depending on the definition used.

Other objects caught between these differences in classification methods include (44594) 1999 OX3, which has a semi-major axis of 32 AU but crosses the orbits of both Uranus and Neptune. It is listed as an outer centaur by the Deep Ecliptic Survey (DES). Among the inner centaurs, (434620) 2005 VD, with a perihelion distance very near Jupiter, is listed as a centaur by both JPL and DES.

A recent orbital simulation of the evolution of Kuiper belt objects through the centaur region has identified a short-lived "orbital gateway" between 5.4 and 7.8 AU through which 21% of all centaurs pass, including 72% of the centaurs that become Jupiter-family comets. Four objects are known to occupy this region (29P/Schwassmann–Wachmann, P/2010 TO_{20} LINEAR-Grauer, P/2008 CL_{94} Lemmon, and 2016 LN8), but simulations indicate that there may of order 1000 more objects >1 km in radius that have yet to be detected. Objects in this gateway region can display significant activity and are in an important evolutionary transition state that further blurs the distinction between the centaur and Jupiter-family comet populations.

== Naming convention ==
According to the International Astronomical Union's Working Group for Small Bodies Nomenclature (WGSBN; formerly the Committee on Small Body Nomenclature), centaurs with semi-major axes less than 30 AU (inside Neptune's orbit) and perihelion distances greater than 5.5 AU (outside Jupiter's orbit) are to be named after mythological centaurs—creatures that are half-horse and half-human. The WGSBN technically counts Neptune-crossing trans-Neptunian objects (semi-major axis >30 AU, perihelion <30 AU) as centaurs and reserves them for a different naming scheme, which was adopted in 2007 when the first of these objects, 65489 Ceto–Phorcys and 42355 Typhon–Echidna, were named. According to the WGSBN, Neptune-crossing trans-Neptunian objects must be named after mythological chimeras, which includes hybrid and shape-shifting mythical creatures. One example of a named object in this category is 471325 Taowu, whose namesake is said to be a hybrid of a human, tiger, and a boar.

== Orbits ==
=== Distribution ===
Orbits of known centaurs (Note: For the purpose of this diagram, an object is classified as a centaur if its semi-major axis lies between Jupiter and Neptune)

The diagram illustrates the orbits of known centaurs in relation to the orbits of the planets. For selected objects, the eccentricity of the orbits is represented by red segments (extending from perihelion to aphelion).

The orbits of centaurs show a wide range of eccentricity, from highly eccentric (Pholus, Asbolus, Amycus, Nessus) to more circular (Chariklo and the Saturn-crossers Thereus and Okyrhoe).

To illustrate the range of the orbits' parameters, the diagram shows a few objects with very unusual orbits, plotted in yellow:

- 1999 XS35 (Apollo asteroid) follows an extremely eccentric orbit (e = 0.947), leading it from inside Earth's orbit (0.94 AU) to well beyond Neptune (> 34 AU)
- 2007 TB_{434} follows a quasi-circular orbit (e < 0.026)
- 2001 XZ_{255} has the lowest inclination (i < 3°).
- 2004 YH_{32} is one of a small proportion of centaurs with an extreme prograde inclination (i > 60°). It follows such a highly inclined orbit (79°) that, while it crosses from the distance of the asteroid belt from the Sun to past the distance of Saturn, if its orbit is projected onto the plane of Jupiter's orbit, it does not even go out as far as Jupiter.

Over a dozen known centaurs follow retrograde orbits. Their inclinations range from modest (e.g., 160° for Dioretsa) to extreme (i < 120°; e.g. 105° for (342842) 2008 YB3). Seventeen of these high-inclination, retrograde centaurs were controversially claimed to have an interstellar origin.

=== Changing orbits ===
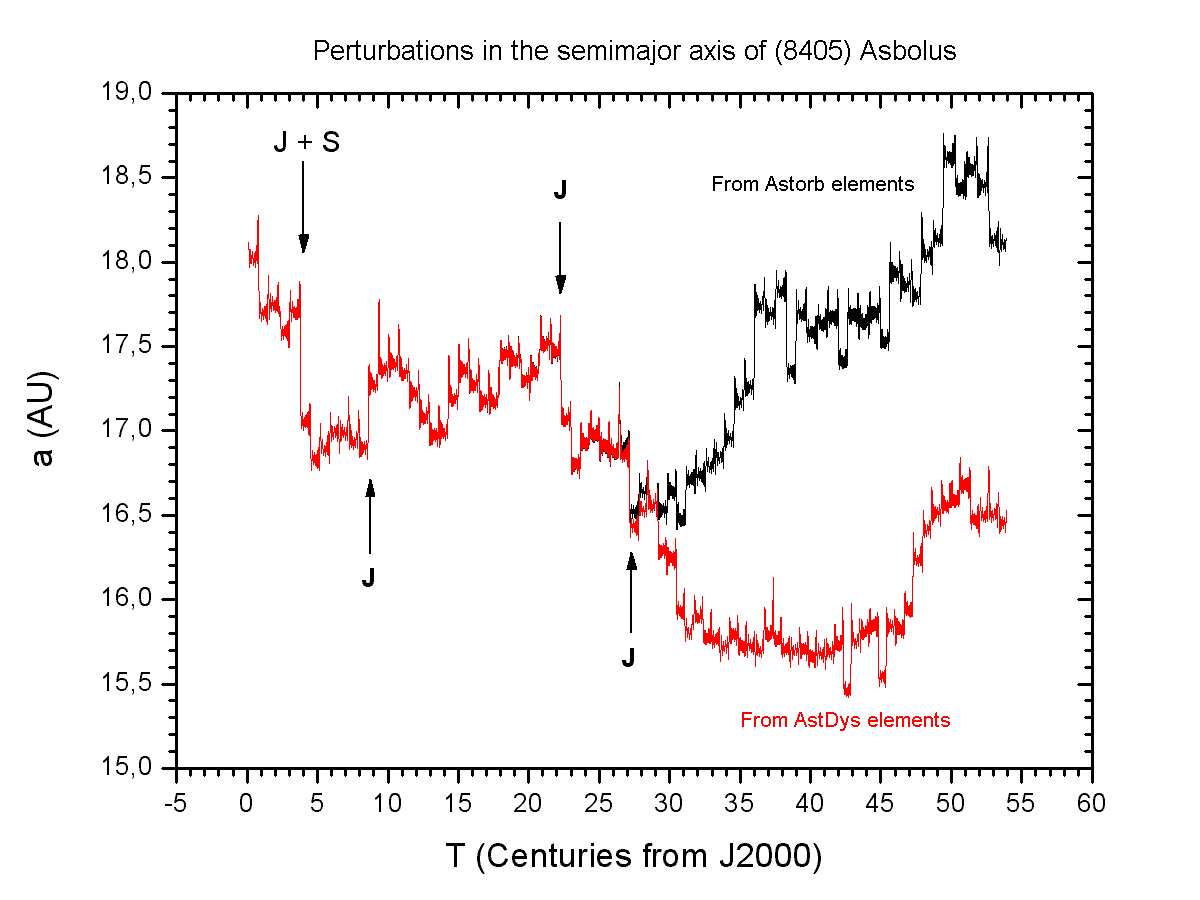
The semi-major axis of Asbolus during the next 5500 years, using two slightly different estimates of present-day orbital elements. After the Jupiter encounter of year 4713 the two calculations diverge.

Because the centaurs are not protected by orbital resonances, their orbits are unstable within a timescale of 10^{6}–10^{7} years. For example, 55576 Amycus is in an unstable orbit near the 3:4 resonance of Uranus. Dynamical studies of their orbits indicate that being a centaur is probably an intermediate orbital state of objects transitioning from the Kuiper belt to the Jupiter family of short-period comets. (679997) 2023 RB will have its orbit notably changed by a close approach to Saturn in 2201.

Objects may be perturbed from the Kuiper belt, whereupon they become Neptune-crossing and interact gravitationally with that planet (see theories of origin). They then become classed as centaurs, but their orbits are chaotic, evolving relatively rapidly as the centaur makes repeated close approaches to one or more of the outer planets. Some centaurs will evolve into Jupiter-crossing orbits whereupon their perihelia may become reduced into the inner Solar System and they may be reclassified as active comets in the Jupiter family if they display cometary activity. Centaurs will thus ultimately collide with the Sun or a planet or else they may be ejected into interstellar space after a close approach to one of the planets, particularly Jupiter.

== Physical characteristics ==
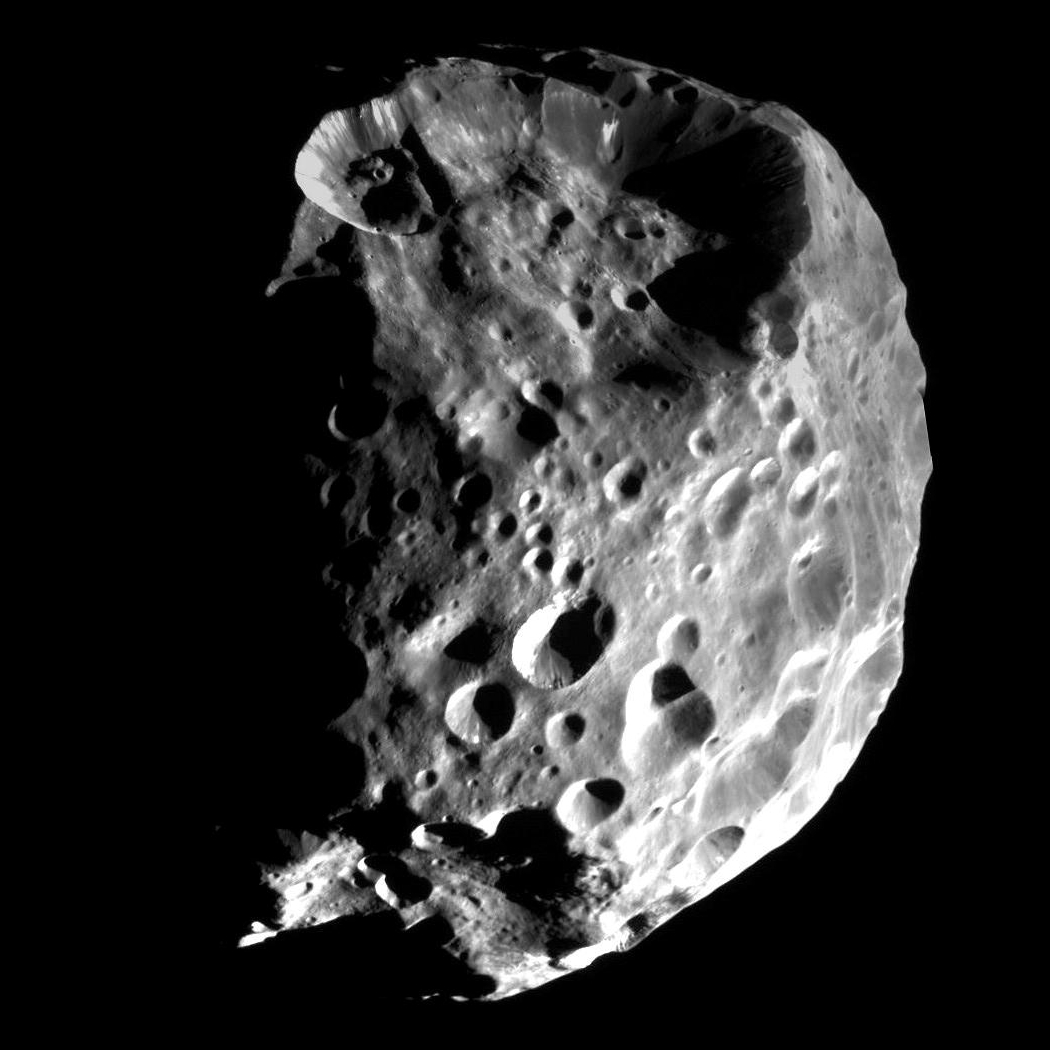
Phoebe, a moon of Saturn imaged by the Cassini-Huygens probe in 2004, is theorized to be a captured centaur.

Compared to dwarf planets and asteroids, the relatively small size and distance of centaurs precludes remote observation of surfaces, but colour indices and spectra can provide clues about surface composition and insight into the origin of the bodies.

=== Colours ===
Colour distribution of centaurs

The colours of centaurs are very diverse, which challenges any simple model of surface composition. In the side-diagram, the colour indices are measures of apparent magnitude of an object through blue (B), visible (V) (i.e. green-yellow) and red (R) filters. The diagram illustrates these differences (in exaggerated colours) for all centaurs with known colour indices. For reference, two moons: Triton and Phoebe, and planet Mars are plotted (yellow labels, size not to scale).

Centaurs appear to be grouped into two classes:

- very red – for example 5145 Pholus
- blue (or blue-grey, according to some authors) – for example 2060 Chiron or 2020 MK4

There are numerous theories to explain this colour difference, but they can be broadly divided into two categories:

- The colour difference results from a difference in the origin and/or composition of the centaur (see origin below)
- The colour difference reflects a different level of space-weathering from radiation and/or cometary activity.

As examples of the second category, the reddish colour of Pholus has been explained as a possible mantle of irradiated red organics, whereas Chiron has instead had its ice exposed due to its periodic cometary activity, giving it a blue/grey index. The correlation with activity and color is not certain, however, as the active centaurs span the range of colors from blue (Chiron) to red (166P/NEAT). Alternatively, Pholus may have been only recently expelled from the Kuiper belt, so that surface transformation processes have not yet taken place.

Delsanti et al. suggest multiple competing processes: reddening by the radiation, and blushing by collisions.

=== Spectra ===
The interpretation of spectra is often ambiguous, related to particle sizes and other factors, but the spectra offer an insight into surface composition. As with the colours, the observed spectra can fit a number of models of the surface.

Water ice signatures have been confirmed on a number of centaurs (including 2060 Chiron, 10199 Chariklo and 5145 Pholus). In addition to the water ice signature, a number of other models have been put forward:

- Chariklo's surface has been suggested to be a mixture of tholins (like those detected on Titan and Triton) with amorphous carbon.
- Pholus has been suggested to be covered by a mixture of Titan-like tholins, carbon black, olivine and methanol ice.
- The surface of 52872 Okyrhoe has been suggested to be a mixture of kerogens, olivines and a small percentage of water ice.
- 8405 Asbolus has been suggested to be a mixture of 15% Triton-like tholins, 8% Titan-like tholin, 37% amorphous carbon and 40% ice tholin.

Chiron appears to be the most complex. The spectra observed vary depending on the period of the observation. Water ice signature was detected during a period of low activity and disappeared during high activity.

=== Similarities to comets ===
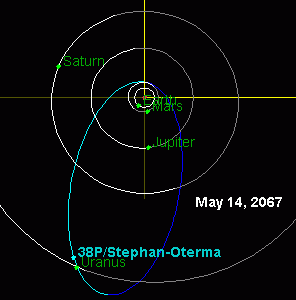
Comet 38P exhibits centaur-like behavior by making close approaches to Jupiter, Saturn, and Uranus between 1982 and 2067.

Observations of Chiron in 1988 and 1989 near its perihelion found it to display a coma (a cloud of gas and dust evaporating from its surface). It is thus now officially classified as both a minor planet and a comet, although it is far larger than a typical comet and there is some lingering controversy. Other centaurs are being monitored for comet-like activity: so far two, 60558 Echeclus, and 166P/NEAT have shown such behavior. 166P/NEAT was discovered while it exhibited a coma, and so is classified as a comet, though its orbit is that of a centaur. Echeclus was discovered without a coma but recently became active, and so it too is now classified as both a comet and an asteroid. Overall, there are ~30 centaurs for which activity has been detected, with the active population biased toward objects with smaller perihelion distances.

Carbon monoxide has been detected in Echeclus and Chiron in very small amounts, and the derived CO production rate was calculated to be sufficient to account for the observed coma. The calculated CO production rate from both Echeclus and Chiron is substantially lower than what is typically observed for 29P/Schwassmann–Wachmann, another distantly active comet often classified as a centaur.

There is no clear orbital distinction between centaurs and comets. Both 29P/Schwassmann–Wachmann and 39P/Oterma have been referred to as centaurs since they have typical centaur orbits. The comet 39P/Oterma is currently inactive and was seen to be active only before it was perturbed into a centaur orbit by Jupiter in 1963. The faint comet 38P/Stephan–Oterma would probably not show a coma if it had a perihelion distance beyond Jupiter's orbit at 5 AU. By the year 2200, comet 78P/Gehrels will probably migrate outwards into a centaur-like orbit.

=== Rotational periods ===
A periodogram analysis of the light-curves of Chiron and Chariklo gives respectively the following rotational periods: 5.5±0.4~h and 7.0± 0.6~h.

=== Size, density, reflectivity ===
Comparison of sizes, albedos, and colors of various large centaurs with measured diameters.

Centaurs can reach diameters up to hundreds of kilometers. The largest centaurs have diameters in excess of 300 km, and primarily reside beyond 20 AU.

== Hypotheses of origin ==
The study of centaurs' origins is rich in recent developments, but any conclusions are still hampered by limited physical data. Different models have been put forward for possible origin of centaurs.

Simulations indicate that the orbit of some Kuiper belt objects can be perturbed, resulting in the object's expulsion so that it becomes a centaur. Scattered disc objects would be dynamically the best candidates (For instance, the centaurs could be part of an "inner" scattered disc of objects perturbed inwards from the Kuiper belt.) for such expulsions, but their colours do not fit the bicoloured nature of the centaurs. Plutinos are a class of Kuiper belt object that display a similar bicoloured nature, and there are suggestions that not all plutinos' orbits are as stable as initially thought, due to perturbation by Pluto. Further developments are expected with more physical data on Kuiper belt objects.

Some centaurs may have their origin in fragmentation episodes, perhaps triggered during close encounters with Jupiter. The orbits of centaurs 2020 MK4, P/2008 CL94 (Lemmon), and P/2010 TO20 (LINEAR-Grauer) pass close to that of comet 29P/Schwassmann–Wachmann, the first discovered centaur and close encounters are possible in which one of the objects traverses the coma of 29P when active.

At least one centaur, 2013 VZ_{70}, might have an origin among Saturn's irregular moon population via impact, fragmentation, or tidal disruption.

== Notable centaurs ==
Name	Year	Discoverer	Half-life (forward)	Class (Note: the class is defined by the perihelion and aphelion distance of the object: S indicates a perihelion/aphelion near Saturn, U near Uranus, N near Neptune, and K in the Kuiper belt.)
2060 Chiron	1977	Charles T. Kowal	1.03 Ma	SU
5145 Pholus	1992	Spacewatch (David L. Rabinowitz)	1.28 Ma	SN
7066 Nessus	1993	Spacewatch (David L. Rabinowitz)	4.9 Ma	SK
8405 Asbolus	1995	Spacewatch (James V. Scotti)	0.86 Ma	SN
10199 Chariklo	1997	Spacewatch	10.3 Ma	U
10370 Hylonome	1995	Mauna Kea Observatory	6.3 Ma	UN
54598 Bienor	2000	Marc W. Buie et al.	?	U
55576 Amycus	2002	NEAT at Palomar	11.1 Ma	UK

== See also ==
- Asteroid
- Dwarf planet
