= Comet Whipple =

Comet Whipple or Whipple's Comet may refer to any of the two comets discovered by American astronomer, Fred Lawrence Whipple, below:

- 36P/Whipple
- C/1937 C1 (Whipple)

It may also be a partial reference to an additional four comets that he had co-discovered with other astronomers:

- C/1932 P1 (Peltier–Whipple)
- C/1940 O1 (Whipple–Paraskevopoulos)
- C/1942 C1 (Whipple–Bernasconi–Kulin)
- C/1942 X1 (Whipple–Fedtke–Tevzadze)
