= Comet Honda =

Comet Honda or Honda's Comet, may refer to any of the twelve comets discovered by Japanese astronomer, Minoru Honda, between 1940 and 1968:

- C/1940 S1 (Okabayasi–Honda)
- C/1941 B1 (Friend–Reese–Honda)
- C/1947 B1 (Honda)
- C/1948 L1 (Honda–Bernasconi)
- 45P/Honda–Mrkos–Pajdušáková, also known as P/1948 X1 and P/1954 C1
- C/1953 G1 (Mrkos–Honda)
- C/1955 O1 (Honda)
- C/1962 H1 (Honda)
- C/1964 L1 (Tomita–Gerber–Honda)
- C/1968 H1 (Tago–Honda–Yamamoto)
- C/1968 N1 (Honda)
- C/1968 Q2 (Honda)
