= Gerard P. Kuiper Prize =

American award in planetary science

The Gerard P. Kuiper Prize is awarded annually by the Division for Planetary Sciences of the American Astronomical Society for outstanding lifetime achievement in the field of planetary science. The prize is named for Gerard P. Kuiper.

== Kuiper Prize winners ==
Source: Gerard P. Kuiper Prize, American Astronomical Society

- 1984 Eugene M. Shoemaker
- 1985 Fred L. Whipple
- 1986 George W. Wetherill
- 1987 Donald M. Hunten
- 1988 Rudolph A. Hanel
- 1989 James B. Pollack
- 1990 Viktor S. Safronov
- 1991 Edward Anders
- 1992 Peter Goldreich
- 1993 James R. Arnold
- 1994 James A. Van Allen
- 1995 Michael J. Belton
- 1996 Barney J. Conrath
- 1997 Irwin I. Shapiro
- 1998 Carl E. Sagan
- 1999 Armand H. Delsemme
- 2000 Conway B. Leovy
- 2001 Bruce Hapke
- 2002 Eberhard Grün
- 2003 Steven J. Ostro
- 2004 Carle M. Pieters
- 2005 William B. Hubbard
- 2006 Dale P. Cruikshank
- 2007 Andrew Ingersoll
- 2008 Michael A'Hearn
- 2009 Tobias Owen
- 2010 Jeff Cuzzi
- 2011 William Ward
- 2012 Darrell Strobel
- 2013 Joseph Veverka
- 2014 Peter J. Gierasch
- 2015 Yuk L. Yung
- 2016 Stan Peale
- 2017 Margaret Kivelson
- 2018 Julio Ángel Fernández
- 2019 Maria Zuber
- 2020 Wing-Huen Ip
- 2021 Therese Encrenaz
- 2022 Bonnie Buratti
- 2023 William B. McKinnon
- 2024 Paul Feldman
- 2025 Faith Vilas

== See also ==
- List of astronomy awards
