= James Warwick =

James Warwick may refer to:

- James Warwick (actor) (born 1947), English actor and director
- James Warwick (The Bold and the Beautiful), a fictional character in the American TV soap opera The Bold and the Beautiful
- James W. Warwick (1924-2013), American radio astronomer
