= 1940 Whipple =

Carbonaceous main-belt asteroid

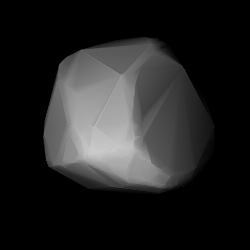
- Modelled shape of Whipple from its lightcurve

Discovery
- Discovered by: Harvard College Obs.
- Discovery site: Agassiz Stn.
- Discovery date: 2 February 1975

Designations
- Named after: Fred L. Whipple (American astronomer)
- Alternative designations: 1975 CA · 1932 AD; 1950 LH · 1962 SH; 1970 EC_{1} · 1971 KD_{1} 1971 KN · A916 AD
- Minor planet category: main-belt · (outer)

Orbital characteristics
- Epoch 4 September 2017 (JD 2458000.5)
- Uncertainty parameter 0
- Observation arc: 54.50 yr (19,907 days)
- Aphelion: 3.2556 AU
- Perihelion: 2.8656 AU
- Semi-major axis: 3.0606 AU
- Eccentricity: 0.0637
- Orbital period (sidereal): 5.35 yr (1,956 days)
- Mean anomaly: 18.583°
- Mean motion: 0° 11^{m} 2.76^{s} / day
- Inclination: 6.5587°
- Longitude of ascending node: 263.80°
- Argument of perihelion: 179.82°

Physical characteristics
- Mean diameter: 32.57±0.43 km 33.83 km (derived); 33.87±1.3 km 36.34±0.66 km 37.481±0.250 km 40.431±0.471 km
- Synodic rotation period: 5.78±0.03 h 6.953±0.003 h
- Geometric albedo: 0.0430±0.0097; 0.054±0.002; 0.0560 (derived); 0.060±0.009; 0.0613±0.005
- Spectral type: C
- Absolute magnitude (H): 11.0 · 11.1 · 11.16±0.27

1940 Whipple (prov. designation: 1975 CA) is a carbonaceous background asteroid from the outer region of the asteroid belt, approximately 35 kilometers (22 miles) in diameter. It was discovered on 2 February 1975, by the Harvard College Observatory at its George R. Agassiz Station near Harvard, Massachusetts, in the United States, and named after astronomer Fred Whipple.

== Classification and orbit ==
Whipple orbits the Sun in the outer main-belt at a distance of 2.9–3.3 AU once every 5 years and 4 months (1,956 days). Its orbit has an eccentricity of 0.06 and an inclination of 7° with respect to the ecliptic. The first used observation was made at Goethe Link Observatory in 1962, extending the asteroid's observation arc by 13 years prior to its discovery observation.

== Naming ==
This minor planet was named after American astronomer Fred Lawrence Whipple (1906–2004), author of the icy conglomerate model, also known as the dirty snowball hypothesis.

Whipple worked at the Harvard College Observatory for over 70 years and was the director of the Smithsonian Astrophysical Observatory where he developed new methods imaging meteors. He was also president of several commissions at the International Astronomical Union and on NASA's panel for missions to small Solar System bodies. The official naming citation was published by the Minor Planet Center on 1 June 1975 (M.P.C. 3828).

== Physical characteristics ==
Whipple has been characterized as a carbonaceous C-type asteroid by Pan-STARRS photometric survey.

=== Diameter and albedo ===
According to the surveys carried out by the Infrared Astronomical Satellite IRAS, the Japanese Akari satellite, and NASA's Wide-field Infrared Survey Explorer with its subsequent NEOWISE mission, the asteroid measures between 32.6 and 40.4 kilometers in diameter and its surface has a low albedo between 0.04 and 0.06. The Collaborative Asteroid Lightcurve Link derives an albedo of 0.056 and a diameter of 33.8 kilometers using an absolute magnitude of 11.1.

=== Lightcurves ===
In December 2011, a rotational lightcurve was obtained for this asteroid from photometric observations by American astronomer Russel Durkee at the Shed of Science Observatory (H39). It gave a well-defined rotation period of 6.953±0.003 hours with a brightness variation of 0.25 magnitude (U=3), superseding a period of 5.78±0.03 hours previously obtained by French astronomer René Roy in 2005 (U=2).
