= Roger J. Phillips =

American geophysicist (1940–2020)

- Born: Roger Jay Phillips; June 9, 1940
- Died: November 19, 2020 (aged 80); Longmont, Colorado
- Citizenship: United States
- Education: Colorado School of Mines University of California, Berkeley
- Awards: Fellow American Geophysical Union, G K Gilbert Award (2003), Whipple Award (2008)
- Scientific career
- Fields: Geophysics, planetary science
- Workplaces: Jet Propulsion Laboratory, Lunar and Planetary Institute, Southern Methodist University, Washington University in St. Louis, Southwest Research Institute
- Thesis: An Investigation of Dipole Radiation in the Lunar Environment. (1968)
- Doctoral advisor: Stanley Harry Ward
- Doctoral students: Suzanne Smrekar, Steve Mueller, Robert Herrick, Jennifer Kidder, Mark Wieczorek, Richard Albert, Rebecca Williams, Steven A. Hauck, II, Daniel Nunes, Brian Hynek, Mindi Searls, Surdas Mohit, Jeff Andrews-Hanna

Roger Jay Phillips (June 9, 1940 – November 19, 2020) was an American geophysicist, planetary scientist, and professor emeritus at the Washington University in St. Louis. His research interests included the geophysical structure of planets, and the use of radar and gravity to investigate the surfaces and interiors of the planets.

== Career ==
Roger J. Phillips received his Ph.D. in 1968 from the University of California, Berkeley where he studied with Stan Ward. Following graduate school he worked at the Jet Propulsion Laboratory. His work at JPL included being the team leader for the Apollo 17 Lunar Sounder Experiment (ALSE). Phillips then served as the Director of the Lunar and Planetary Institute before moving to Southern Methodist University, and later to Washington University in St. Louis where he served as a Professor and as Director of the McDonnell Center for the Space Sciences at the university.

Phillips worked on several spacecraft missions such as Magellan, Mars Global Surveyor, Mars Reconnaissance Orbiter, and MESSENGER.

Phillips served as the editor of Geophysical Research Letters and co-edited the books the Origin of the Moon and Venus II.

Phillips was a fellow of the American Geophysical Union, received the G. K. Gilbert Award from the Geological Society of America in 2003 and the Whipple Award from the American Geophysical Union in 2008

== Scientific contributions ==
Phillips' early work determined that the mascons on the Moon that perturbed the trajectory of early lunar orbiters was the result of near surface structure of impact basins and made some of the early estimates of the thickness of the crust of Mars prior to the Viking orbiters.

Using the Apollo 17 Lunar Sounder Experiment data Phillips and his team collected they made the first observations of near surface variations in rock layers on the Moon.

Phillips is well-known for his contributions to understanding the tectonics, impact craters and resurfacing history and the interior and crustal evolution of Venus.

Phillips is also known for explaining how the growth of the massive Tharsis volcanic province on Mars shaped the entire planet and influenced the pattern of precipitation runoff on early Mars and demonstrating how the lithosphere of Mars under the north pole of the planet is not deflected by the massive polar caps. He also demonstrated that there are CO_{2} ice deposits within the southern polar cap of Mars.
