= Conway B. Leovy =

Conway Leovy (July 16, 1933 – July 9, 2011) was a professor emeritus of Atmospheric Sciences and Geophysics at the University of Washington, RAND author, former University Corporation for Atmospheric Research Trustee, Fellow of the American Meteorological Society, and American political activist. He was awarded the NASA Exceptional Scientific Achievement Medal and was a co-recipient of the American Association for the Advancement of Science (AAAS) Newcomb Cleveland Prize. In 2000 he won The Gerard P. Kuiper Prize, awarded annually by the Division for Planetary Sciences of the American Astronomical Society for outstanding lifetime achievement in the field of planetary science.
