= FH Serpentis =

1970 Nova in the constellation Serpens

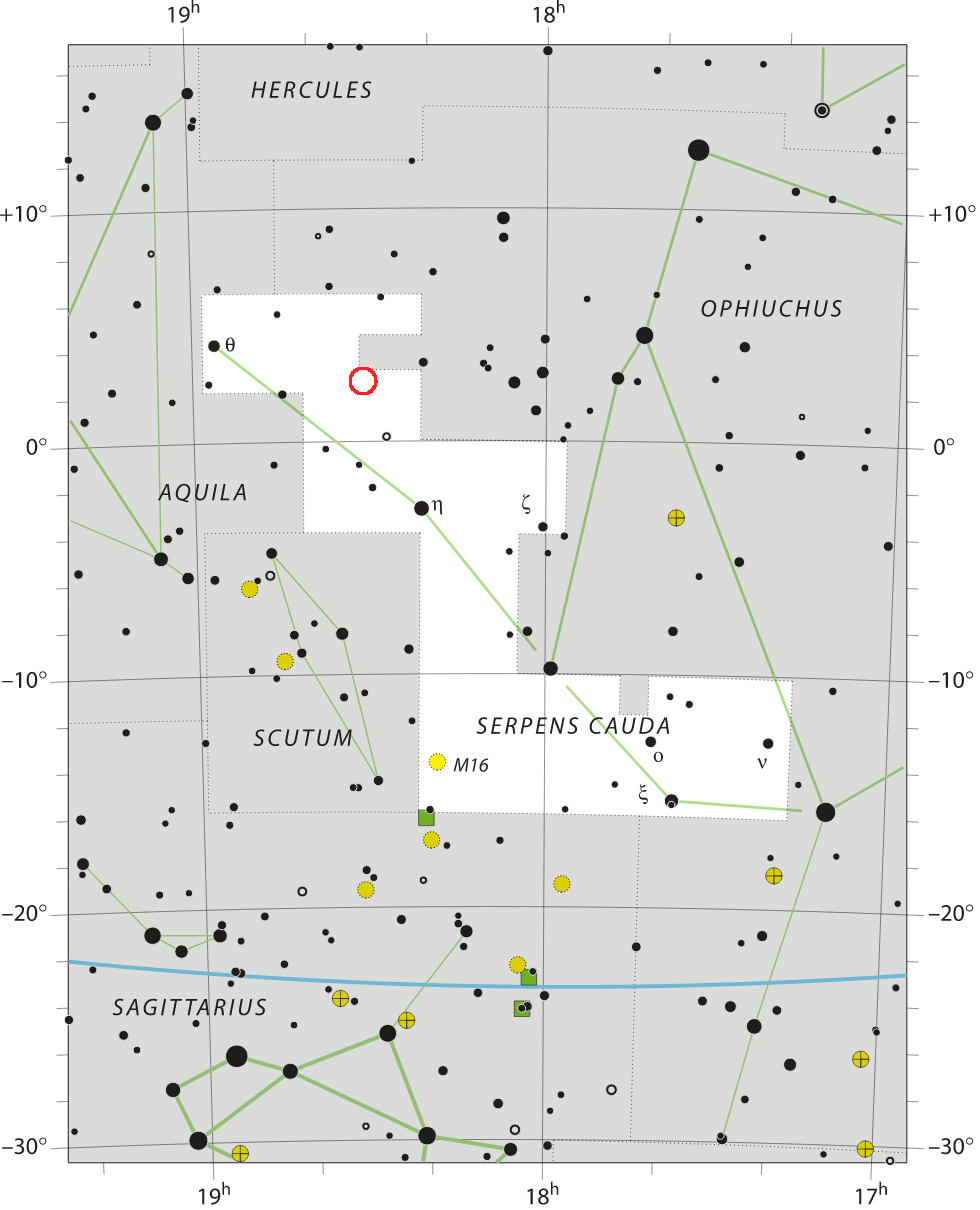
- Location of FH Serpentis (circled in red)

Observation data Epoch J2000.0 Equinox ICRS
- Constellation: Serpens
- Right ascension: 18^{h} 30^{m} 47.0400^{s}
- Declination: +02° 36′ 52.0264″
- Apparent magnitude (V): 4.5 Max. 16.8 Min.

Characteristics
- Variable type: Nova

Astrometry
Proper motion (μ)	RA: 2.060±0.142 mas/yr Dec.: −3.047±0.167 mas/yr
Parallax (π)	0.9512±0.0765 mas
Distance	1060+112 −68 pc

Other designations
- Nova Ser 1970, AAVSO 1825+02, Gaia DR2 4276984993803967744

Database references
SIMBAD	data

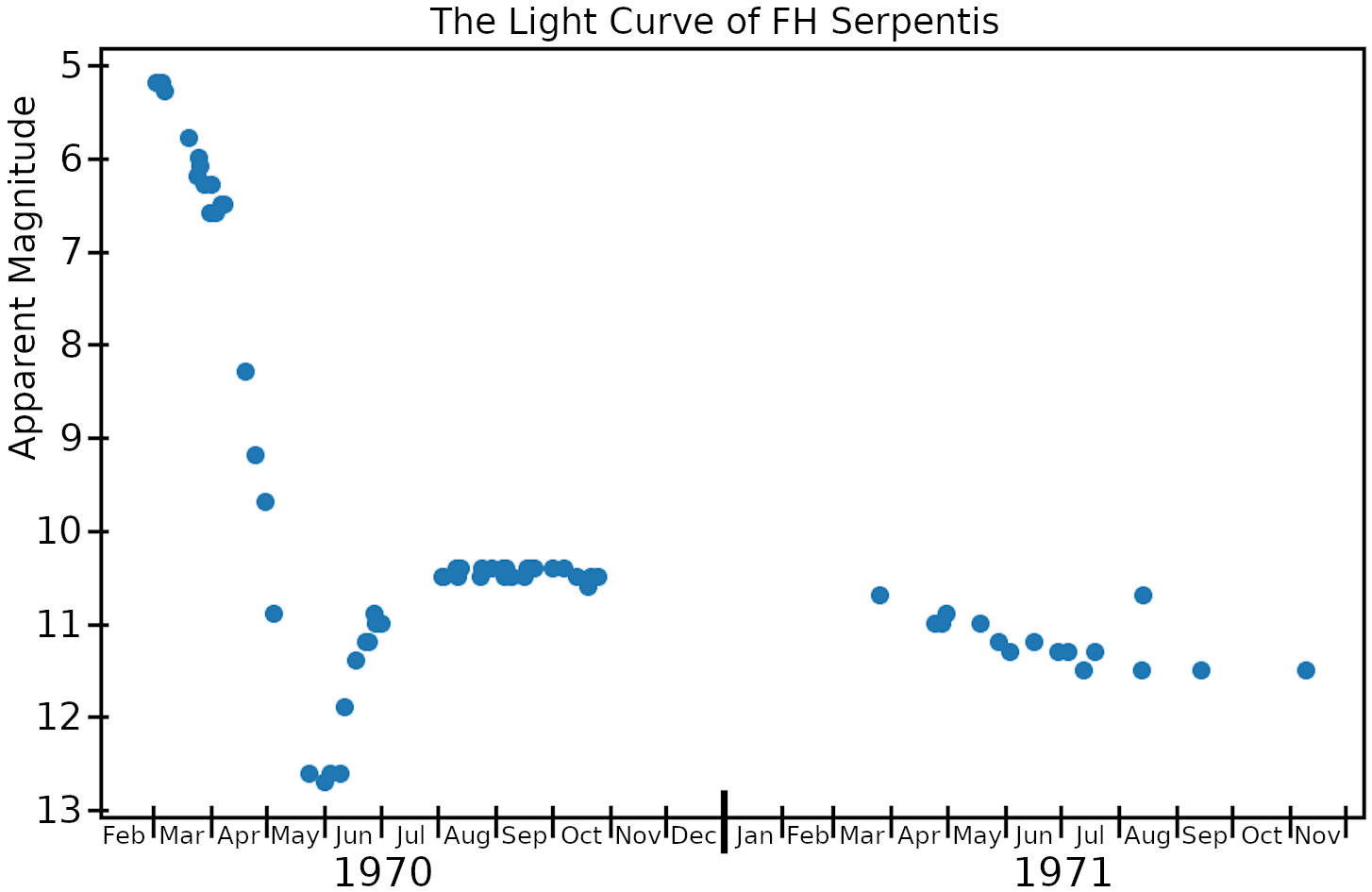
The light curve of FH Serpentis, plotted from AAVSO data. The local minimum in brightness around the end of May 1970 is a "dust dip", which occurs when dust forms as the expelled material expands and cools.

FH Serpentis (Nova Serpentis 1970) was a nova, which appeared in the constellation Serpens in 1970. It reached magnitude 4.4. It was discovered on February 13, 1970 by Minoru Honda located at Kurashiki, Japan. Other astronomers later studied this nova, and calculated its distances based on the decay time of its light curves.

Nova Serpentis was also observed by the NASA space observatory OAO-2 Stargazer, active from 1968 to 1973.

The nova was important for science because it was one of the first to be observed in multiple wavelength bands including, infrared, visible, ultra-violet, and radio. One of the observations that stood out was that it became brightest in the infrared 100 days after it was first discovered.

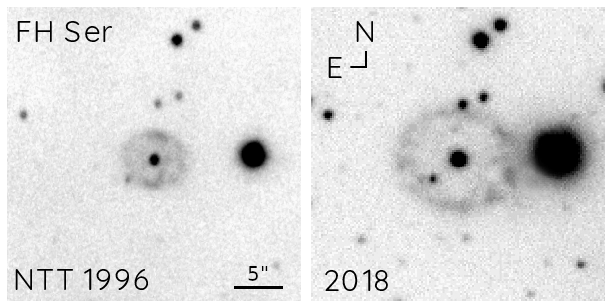
Two images of the shell surrounding FH Serpentis taken 22 years apart, showing the nebula's expansion. Both were taken with Hα filters, left at the New Technology Telescope, and right with the Nordic Optical Telescope.

A small emission nebula (shell) is visible around the star, which resembles a planetary nebula. Santamaria et al. examined images of the nebula taken in 1996 and 2018 and found that the shell is clearly expanding. It is slightly elliptical, with major and minor axes of 12.4×10.6 arc seconds (as of 2018) expanding at a rate of 0.125×0.109 arc seconds per year, implying a physical expansion rate of 630×540 km/sec.
