= James B. Pollack =

American astrophysicist (1938-1994)

James Pollack
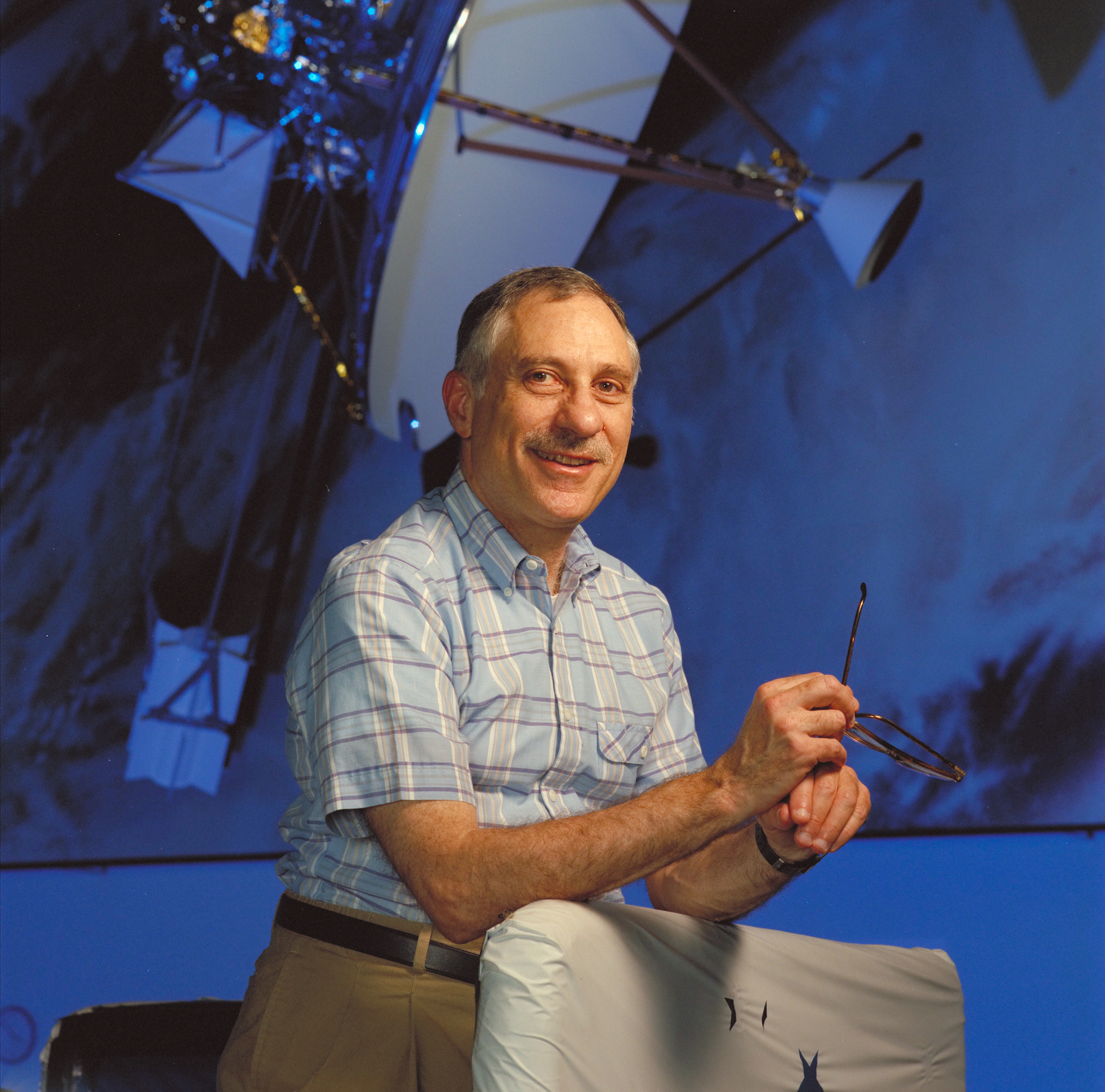
- Born: July 9, 1938; New York City, US
- Died: June 13, 1994 (aged 55); San Jose, California, U.S.
- Known for: nuclear winter, dinosaur extinction, terraforming, planet formation
- Awards: Gerard P. Kuiper Prize, 1989
- Scientific career
- Fields: planetology, atmospheric science
- Thesis: Theoretical studies of Venus: an application of planetary astrophysics (1965)
- Doctoral advisor: Carl Sagan (Harvard University, 1962 – 1965)

James Barney Pollack (July 9, 1938 – June 13, 1994) was an American astrophysicist who worked for NASA's Ames Research Center.

Pollack was born on July 9, 1938, in New York City, and was brought up in Woodmere, Long Island by a Jewish family that was in the women's garment business. He was a valedictorian of his class at Lawrence High School and graduated from Princeton University in 1960. He then received his master's in nuclear physics at University of California, Berkeley in 1962 and his PhD from Harvard in 1965, where he was a student of Carl Sagan. He was openly gay. Dorion Sagan told how his father came to the defense of Pollack's partner in a problem with obtaining treatment at the university health service emergency department.

Pollack specialized in atmospheric science, especially the atmospheres of Mars and Venus. He investigated the possibility of terraforming Mars, the extinction of the dinosaurs and the possibility of nuclear winter since the 1980s with Christopher McKay and Sagan. The work of Pollack et al. (1996) on the formation of giant planets ("core accretion paradigm") is seen today as the standard model.

He explored the weather on Mars using data from the Mariner 9 spacecraft and the Viking mission. On this he based ground-breaking computer simulations of winds, storms, and the general climate on that planet. An overview of Pollack's scientific vita is given in the memorial talk "James B. Pollack: A Pioneer in Stardust to Planetesimals Research" held at an Astronomical Society of the Pacific 1996 symposium.

He was a recipient of the Gerard P. Kuiper Prize in 1989 for outstanding lifetime achievement in the field of planetary science. Pollack died at his home in California in 1994 from a rare form of spinal cancer, at age 55.

A crater on Mars was named in his honor.

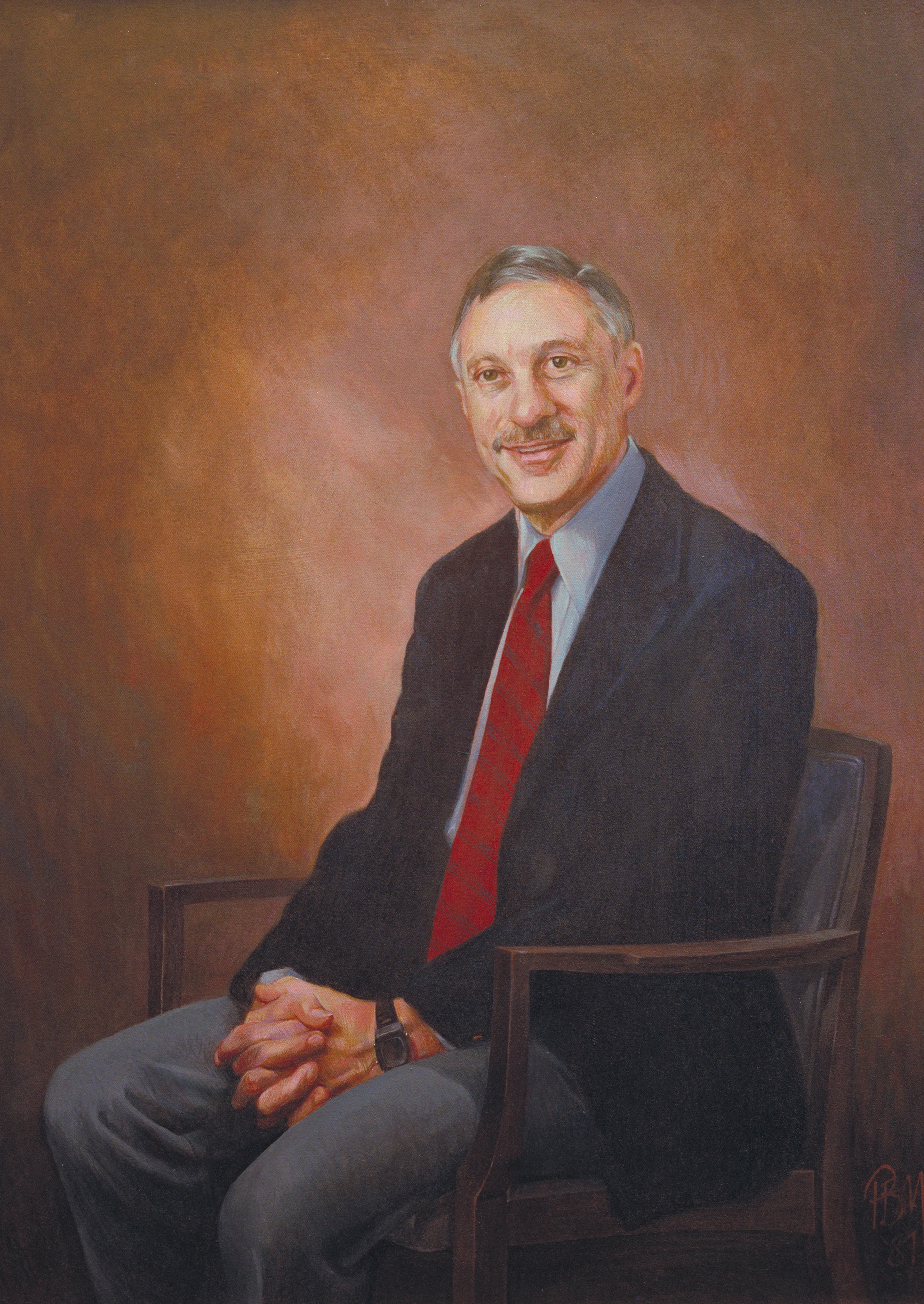

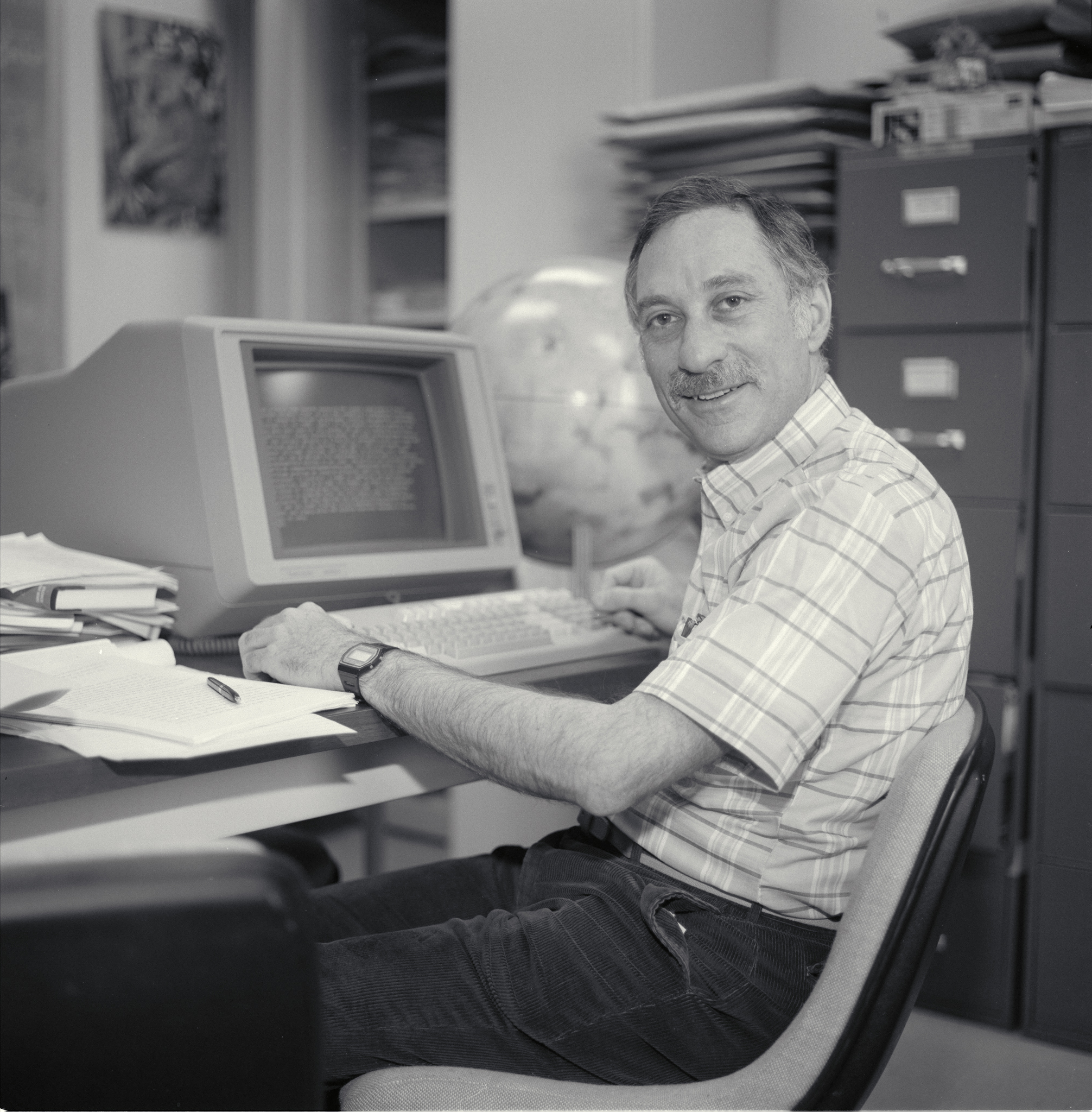

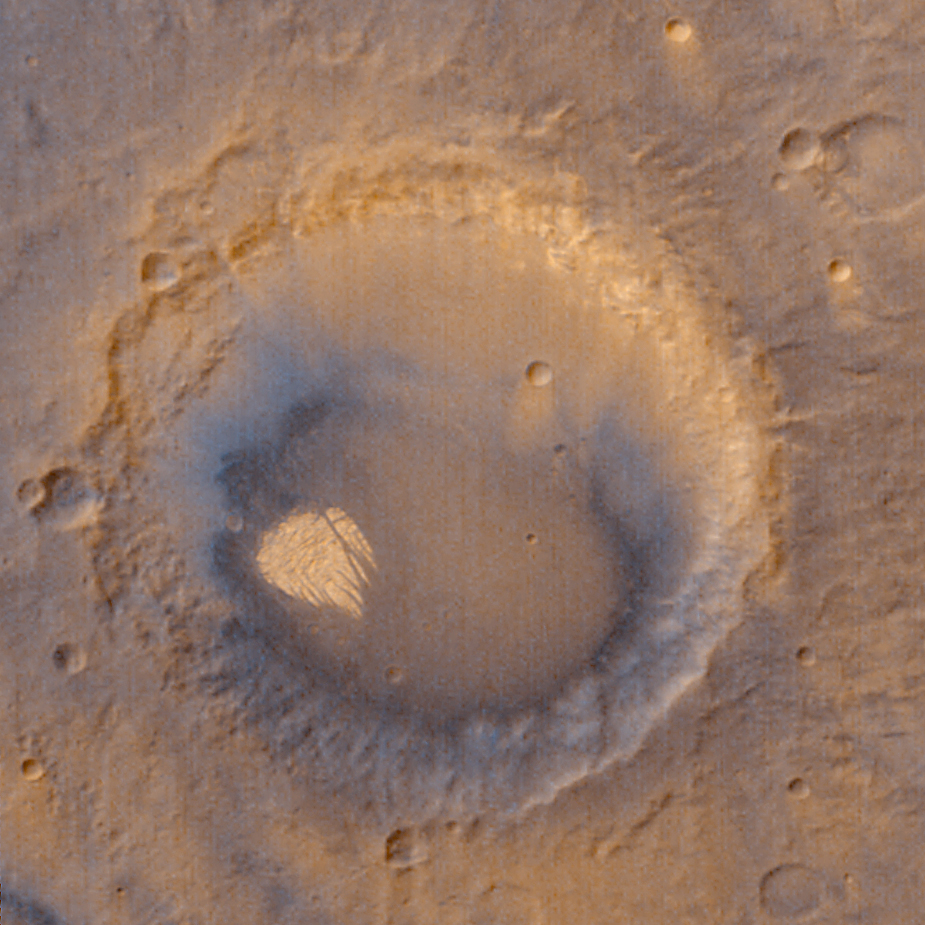
