= Wing-Huen Ip =

Chinese-born German astronomer (born 1947)

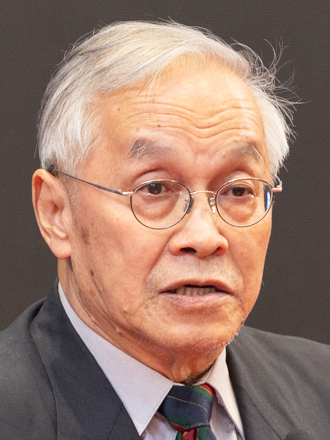
Ip in 2023

Wing-Huen Ip (Chinese: 葉永烜; 10 March 1947) is a Chinese-born German astronomer.

== Early life and education ==
Ip was born in Nanjing in 1947. He was raised in Macau and graduated from the Chinese University of Hong Kong with a Bachelor of Arts in physics in 1969, then moved to the United States to obtain a Master of Arts in the same subject from the University of Pittsburgh the following year. He completed his doctorate in applied physics and information technology at the University of California, San Diego in 1974. He remained at UCSD to pursue postdoctoral research.

== Career ==
Between 1978 and 1998, Ip worked at the Max Planck Institute for Aeronomy. He relocated to Taiwan in 1998, serving as dean of science for National Central University until 2004, and subsequently vice president until 2008. He also held the Kwok-Ting Li Chair Professorship within NCU's Institute of Astronomy. Ip is a founding member of the Asia Oceania Geosciences Society, established in 2004.

Ip is a 2007 fellow of the American Geophysical Union, a 2016 member of Academia Sinica, and 2020 recipient of the American Astronomical Society's Gerard P. Kuiper Prize. In 2023, Ip became a laureate of the Asian Scientist 100 by the Asian Scientist.
