= Faith Vilas =

American astronomer

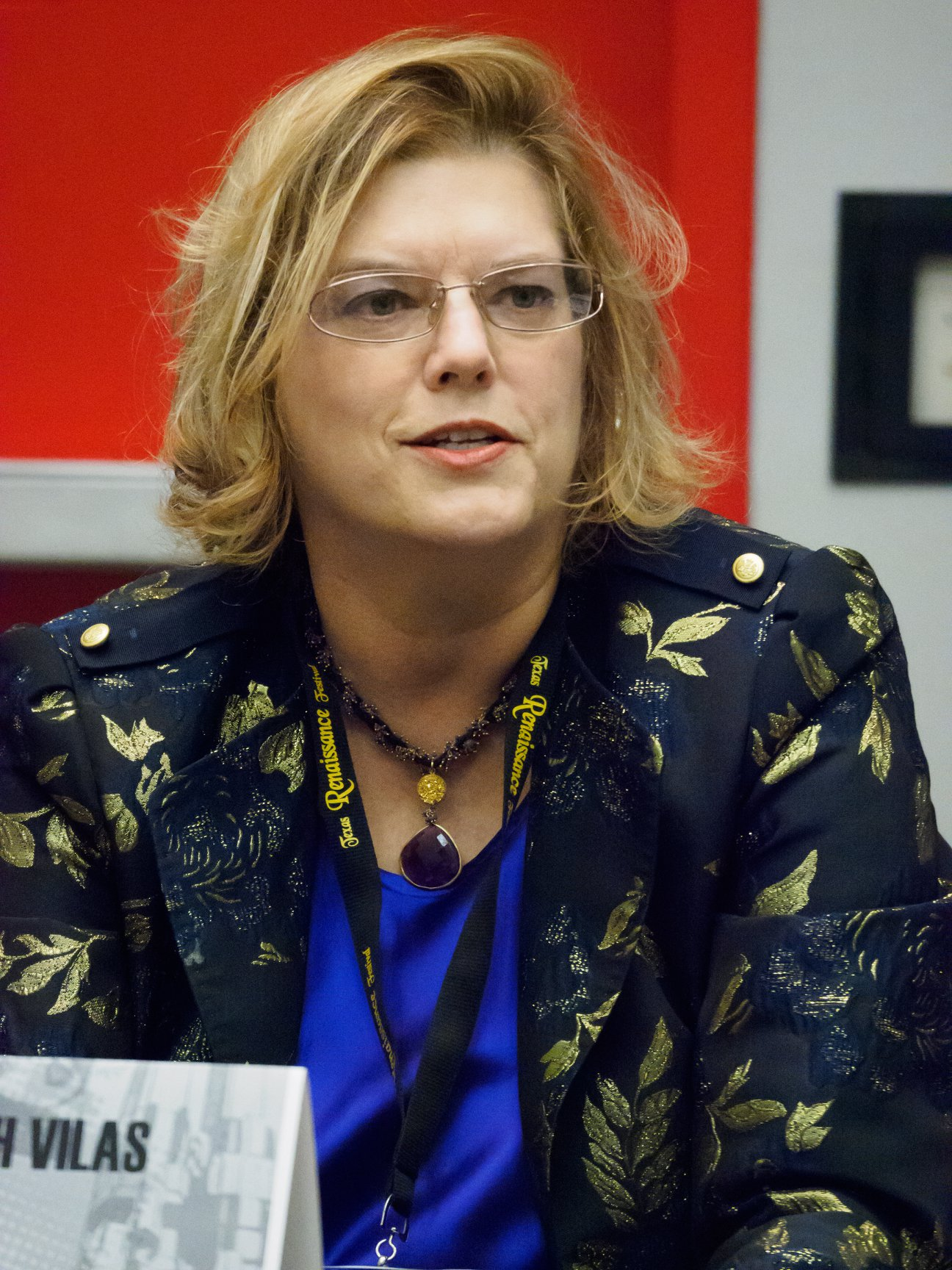
- Born: 1952
- Alma mater: Wellesley College; Massachusetts Institute of Technology; University of Arizona
- Occupation: Scientist
- Awards: Masursky Award (Division for Planetary Sciences, –2018); Antarctica Service Medal (1988); fellow (American Astronomical Society, 2019); Whipple Award (2019)
- Website: www.psi.edu/about/staffpage/fvilas
- Position held: scientist (1999–2011), director (2005–2010), chair (1996–1997)

Faith Vilas is an American planetary scientist and Director of the MMT Observatory in Arizona.

== Education ==
Vilas earned her BA in astronomy in 1973 at Wellesley College and her MS in Earth and Planetary Sciences in 1975 at MIT. She completed her Doctoral degree in Planetary Sciences in 1984 at the University of Arizona.

== Career ==
Vilas was a scientist at NASA Johnson Space Center from 1985 through 2005 where she worked on quantifying orbital debris from spacecraft in low Earth orbit, geosynchronous orbit, or geotransfer orbit. Her observations helped to prove the existence of Neptune's rings five years before they were confirmed by a 1989 Voyager mission. She designed the coronagraph used to produce the first-ever image of a circumstellar disk around another star (Beta Pictoris) in 1984. Since her MS degree, Vilas has worked on the planet Mercury, serving an editor for a 1989 collection of reviews published by the University of Arizona Press. Vilas has been a pioneer in the identification of hydrated minerals through use of an absorption band near 700 nm. This absorption has been incorporated into the most recent asteroid taxonomies, and is one of the key measurements likely to be used for prospecting by future asteroid mining companies.

While at JSC, she participated in the 1987-88 Antarctic Search for Meteorites season in Antarctica, helping collect nearly 700 meteorites from the Beardmore/Walcott Neve and Allan Hills/Elephant Moraine icefields. She also served as the Program Scientist for the Discovery, Dawn, and NEAR data analysis programs at NASA Headquarters from 2001 to 2002, ensuring the integrity of the Discovery program selection process during a time of national duress following the chaos of the 9/11 attack.

Vilas then became the director of the Multiple Mirror Telescope Observatory from 2005 to 2010, where she managed telescope and instrumentation operations, conducted short-term and long-term observatory planning, and supervised the scientific and technical staff. She joined the staff of the Planetary Science Institute in 2011. At PSI, she was Participating Scientist on NASA's MESSENGER mission to Mercury and the Atsa Suborbital Observatory Project Scientist. She is a Participating Scientist on NASA's Lunar Reconnaissance Orbiter LAMP team, and on the Joint Science Team for the Japanese Hayabusa-2 mission to asteroid 162173 Ryugu. She served as Program Director for planets and exoplanets at the National Science Foundation from 2015 to 2018. She has returned to PSI. In 2019, she became a science editor for the American Astronomical Society (AAS) journals, and later that year was named the inaugural editor of The Planetary Science Journal, a new open access journal in the Division for Planetary Sciences (DPS) at AAS.

== Honors and recognition ==
- The American Astronomical Society Division for Planetary Sciences awarded Vilas the Harold Masursky Award in 2018 for meritorious service to planetary science.
- The American Geophysical Union awarded Vilas the Fred Whipple Award in 2019 for significant contributions to the field of planetary science.
- She was elected a Legacy Fellow of the American Astronomical Society in 2020.
- Asteroid 3507 Vilas is named for her.
- Wellesley College awarded Vilas the Alumnae Achievement Award in 2023, given annually to graduates who through their achievements, have brought honor to themselves and the college.
- The American Astronomical Society awarded Vilas the Gerard P. Kuiper Prize in 2025 for outstanding lifetime achievement in the field of planetary science.

== Personal life ==
Vilas is a trained pilot, from a family of pilots. Her grandfather was the first person to fly across Lake Michigan, and in celebration of that feat's 100th anniversary she recreated his flight. Vilas is married to Larry W. Smith, a safety and reliability engineer.
