= Whipple Award =

Fred Whipple Award
- Awarded for: outstanding contributions in the field of planetary science
- Presented by: American Geophysical Union
- First award: 1990
- Website: https://www.agu.org/Honor-and-Recognize/Honors/Section-Awards/Whipple-Award-Lecture

The Fred Whipple Award, established in 1989 by the Planetary Sciences Section of the American Geophysical Union, is presented to an individual who makes an outstanding contribution to the field of planetary science. The award was established to honor Fred Whipple. The Whipple Award includes an opportunity to present an invited lecture during the American Geophysical Union Fall Meeting.

== Recipients ==
Source: AGU

| Year | Recipient | References |
|---|---|---|
| 1990 | Fred Whipple | |
| 1993 | Eugene Shoemaker | |
| 1994 | David J. Stevenson | |
| 1995 | Gordon Pettengill | |
| 1998 | John B. Adams | |
| 1999 | Bruce C. Murray | |
| 2002 | Thomas B. McCord | |
| 2004 | John A. Wood | |
| 2005 | John T. Wasson | |
| 2007 | Raymond E. Arvidson | |
| 2008 | Roger J. Phillips | |
| 2009 | Jean-Pierre Bibring | |
| 2011 | Joseph Veverka | |
| 2012 | Steven Squyres | |
| 2013 | Harry McSween | |
| 2014 | Larry Soderblom | |
| 2015 | Alfred McEwen | |
| 2016 | John Spencer | |
| 2017 | Michael Malin | |
| 2018 | Philip R. Christensen | |
| 2019 | Faith Vilas | |
| 2020 | Robert O. Pepin | |
| 2021 | Paul Schenk | |
| 2022 | Ralph D. Lorenz | |
| 2023 | Thomas H. Prettyman | |
| 2024 | Suzanne Smrekar | |
| 2025 | Scott L. Murchie | |

== See also ==
- List of astronomy awards
- List of geophysics awards
- List of awards named after people
