= C/1948 L1 (Honda–Bernasconi) =

Non-periodic comet

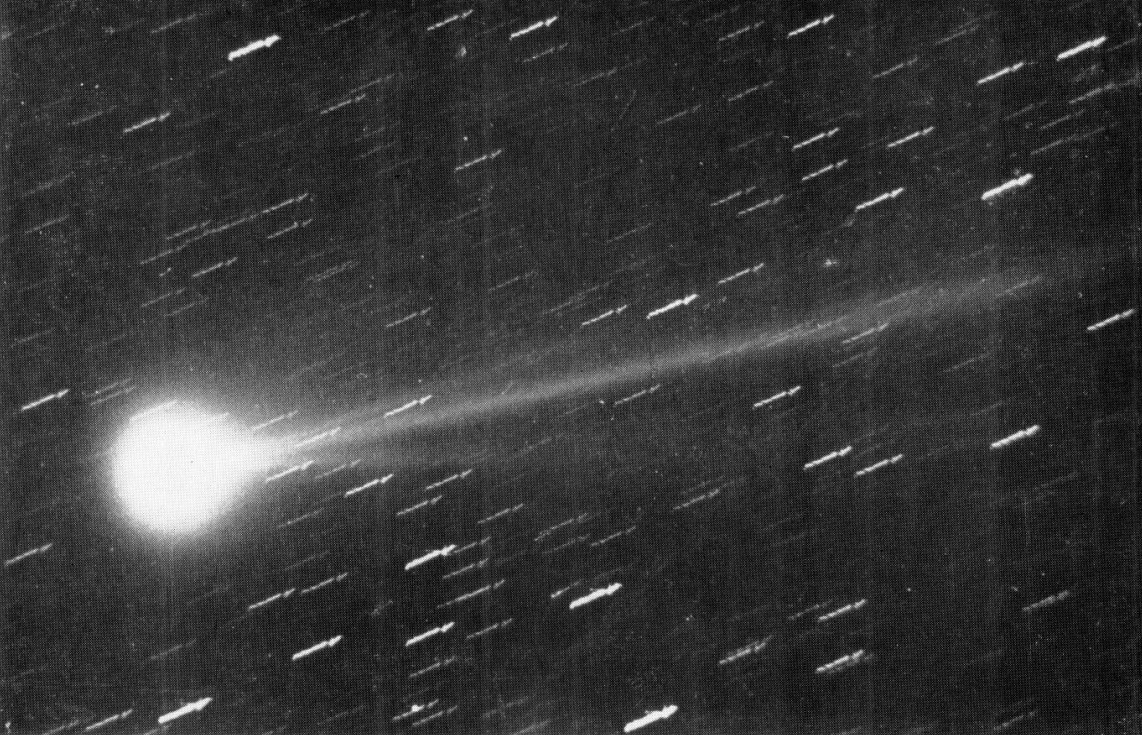
- Comet Honda–Bernasconi photographed by Paolo Maffei on 10 June 1948

Discovery
- Discovered by: Minoru Honda; Giovanni Bernasconi
- Discovery date: 3 June 1948

Designations
- Alternative designations: 1948g, 1948 IV

Orbital characteristics
- Epoch: 25 June 1948 (JD 2432727.5)
- Observation arc: 33 days
- Number of observations: 17
- Perihelion: 0.207 AU
- Eccentricity: 1.001
- Inclination: 23.19°
- Longitude of ascending node: 203.66°
- Argument of periapsis: 317.15°
- Last perihelion: 15 May 1948
- T_{Jupiter}: 0.523
- Earth MOID: 0.078 AU
- Jupiter MOID: 0.74 AU

Physical characteristics
- Mean radius: 0.643 km (0.400 mi) (Note: Calculated mean radius using the formula: $\log_{10}\,(\,R\,)\ =\;0.9 +\;0.13 (\,H\,)$ Where $\,H\,$ is the comet's absolute total magnitude (M1))
- Comet total magnitude (M1): 8.4
- Apparent magnitude: 4.0 (1948 apparition)

C/1948 L1 (Honda–Bernasconi) is a non-periodic comet discovered on 3 June 1948. The comet was discovered by Minoru Honda and independently found by Giovanni Bernasconi the next day.

== Observational history ==
The comet was detected with the naked eye by Minoru Honda on 3 June 1948 and confirmed by him using his 6 in (15 cm) reflector telescope. He noted the comet had an apparent magnitude of about 4 and a tail more than one degree long. He reobserved the comet the next day. The comet was independently discovered by Giovanni Bernasconi, from Cagno, Italy, on 4 June. One more independent discovery was that of Tosikazu Higasi, who spotted the comet on board a ship on 5 June, while he was returning from observing the solar eclipse of May 9, 1948.

Upon discovery the comet was located in the constellation of Perseus, at a solar elongation of 32°, and had passed perihelion three weeks before and was approaching Earth. Closest approach was on 14 June, at a distance of 0.49 AU (73 million km). The comet remained a faint naked eye object for about a week. On 10 June, George van Biesbroeck reported its magnitude to be 5.2. The coma was reported to 7–8 arcminutes across and its tail was over two degrees long. On 14 June the magnitude was reported to be 5. The tail on that date was 5 degrees long. The comet faded consequently and on 25 June its magnitude was given to be 6.7 as seen from binoculars.

The comet continued to fade with a slow rate until 4 July, when it was 8.7 mag, but after that its brightness dropped sharply and on 11 August its photographic magnitude was reported to be 16, instead of the predicted 12.4, and on 3 September was 20 instead of 14.4. The latter was the last time the comet was observed.

== Scientific results ==
The spectrum of the comet obtained on 13-14 June from the University of Michingan Observatory showed the presence of diatomic carbon and cyanide lines. The stronger lines were λ3883 and λ4737. The λ5165 was of moderate strength, while λ4216 and λ4382 were weak and of about equal intensity. There was also detected the λ4050 group of CH2 in moderate strength. The spectrum of the tail showed the λλ4010, 4262, and 4557 lines of CO+. The spectrum obtained on 9-10 June by Sonneberg Observatory showed strong diatomic carbon and cyanide lines and weak triatomic carbon and CH lines.

== Meteors ==
The comet has been associated with the weak 55 Arietids meteor shower, which peaks on 27 October. It is possible it was created by meteors ejected from a time the comet's orbit passed closer to Earth.

== See also ==
- C/1942 C1 (Whipple–Bernasconi–Kulin)
