= Joseph Veverka =

American astronomer

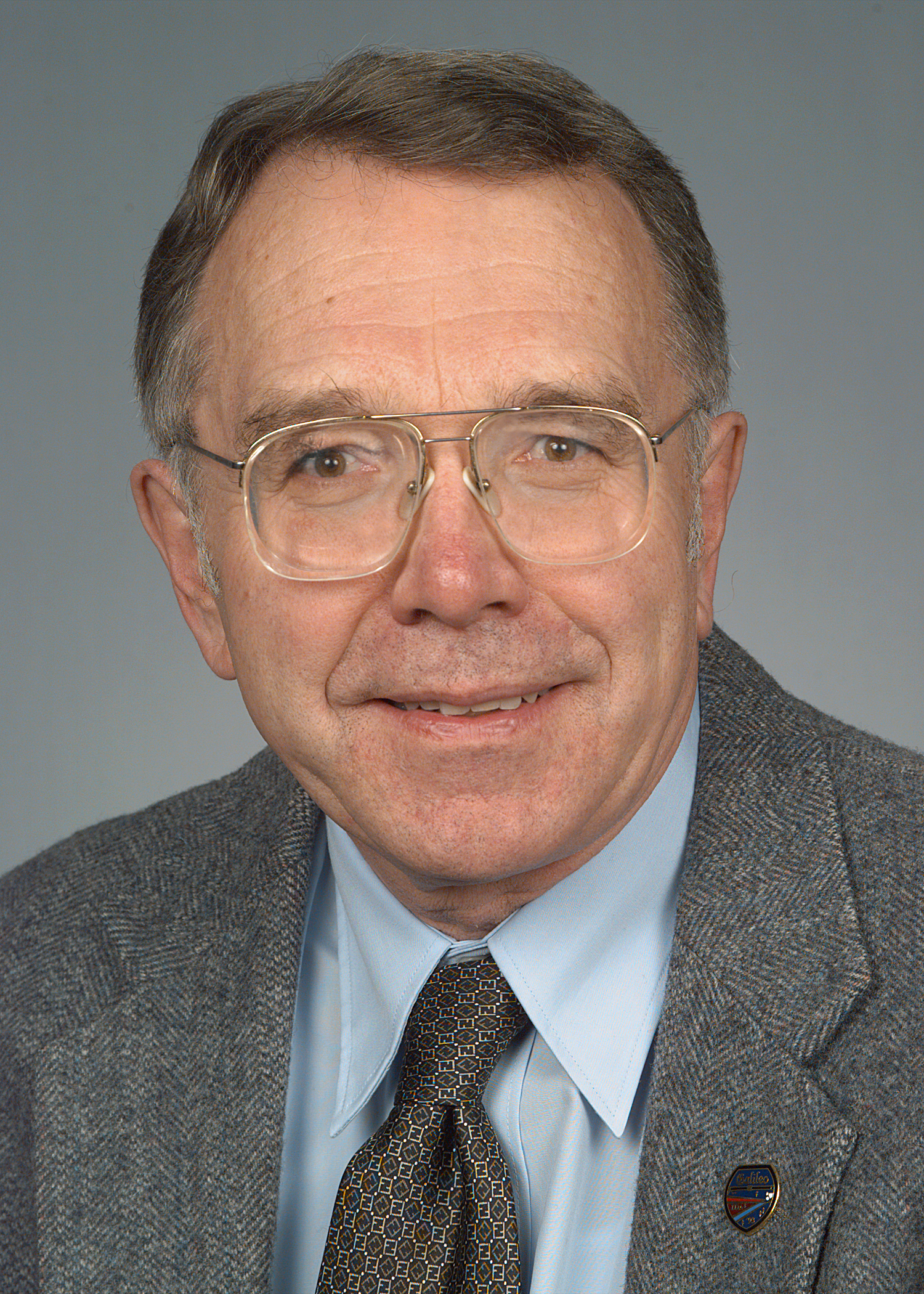
- Born: 1941 (age 84–85); Pelhřimov, Czechoslovakia
- Citizenship: American
- Education: Queen's University; Harvard University
- Known for: Science lead for CONTOUR and Stardust
- Scientific career
- Fields: Planetary science Astronomy
- Workplaces: Cornell University
- Doctoral advisor: Fred Whipple

Joseph Veverka (born 1941) is the James A. Weeks Professor of Physical Sciences, professor of Astronomy at Cornell University in Ithaca, New York. His research area is in planetary sciences, with a focus on physical studies of satellite surfaces and planetary rings. Veverka was the principal investigator on the NASA Discovery Program mission CONTOUR, a co-investigator of the Deep Impact space mission to Comet Tempel 1, and is the principal investigator on the NASA Discovery Mission of Opportunity, Stardust-NeXT. He received the 2001 National Air and Space Museum Trophy and has the asteroid 2710 Veverka named after him.

== Education ==
Veverka was born in Pelhřimov, Czechoslovakia in what is now the Czech Republic. In 1948 his family fled the communist regime going first to France and then to Canada in 1951. He grew up in Cochrane, Ontario.

Veverka received his B.S. in Physics from Queen's University in Kingston, Ontario. He received his Ph.D. in 1970 from Harvard University, where he was a student of Fred Whipple.

== Career ==
Veverka was a postdoc and research scientist at the Jet Propulsion Laboratory working on the Mariner 9 project.

He then became the principal investigator on NASA's Comet Nucleus Tour (CONTOUR) mission, a co-investigator of the NASA Deep Impact mission to comet Tempel 1, and the principal investigator on the NASA Stardust-NExT mission to comet Tempel 1 in 2011.

Veverka has been a faculty member at Cornell University since 1970. He was chair of the Department of Astronomy at the university from 1999 - 2007.

He has served several times on the National Academy of Sciences Committee for Planetary Exploration (COMPLEX), serving as chair in 2007-2010. He is a member of the Space Studies Board and current Chair of the Primitive Bodies Panel of the Decadal Studies for Planetary Exploration.

== Personal life ==
Veverka is married to astronomer Ann Harch, in whose honor Asteroid 9251 Harch is named. He is a fan of opera; his favorite are operas by Vincenzo Bellini. His other hobby is cooking. Velvelka and Harch reside with their Bernese Mountain Dog Leia in the hamlet of Brooktondale, New York, eight miles southeast of Ithaca.

== Awards and honors ==
Veverka has been awarded the 2011 Whipple Award and the 2013 Gerard P. Kuiper Prize for his contributions to planetary science. He is the recipient of the 2001 National Air and Space Museum Trophy for leadership during the NEAR mission and in 1979 he was awarded the NASA medal for Exceptional Scientific Achievement for his investigations of Mars's moons Phobos and Deimos.
