= Andrew Ingersoll =

American astronomer

Andrew Perry Ingersoll
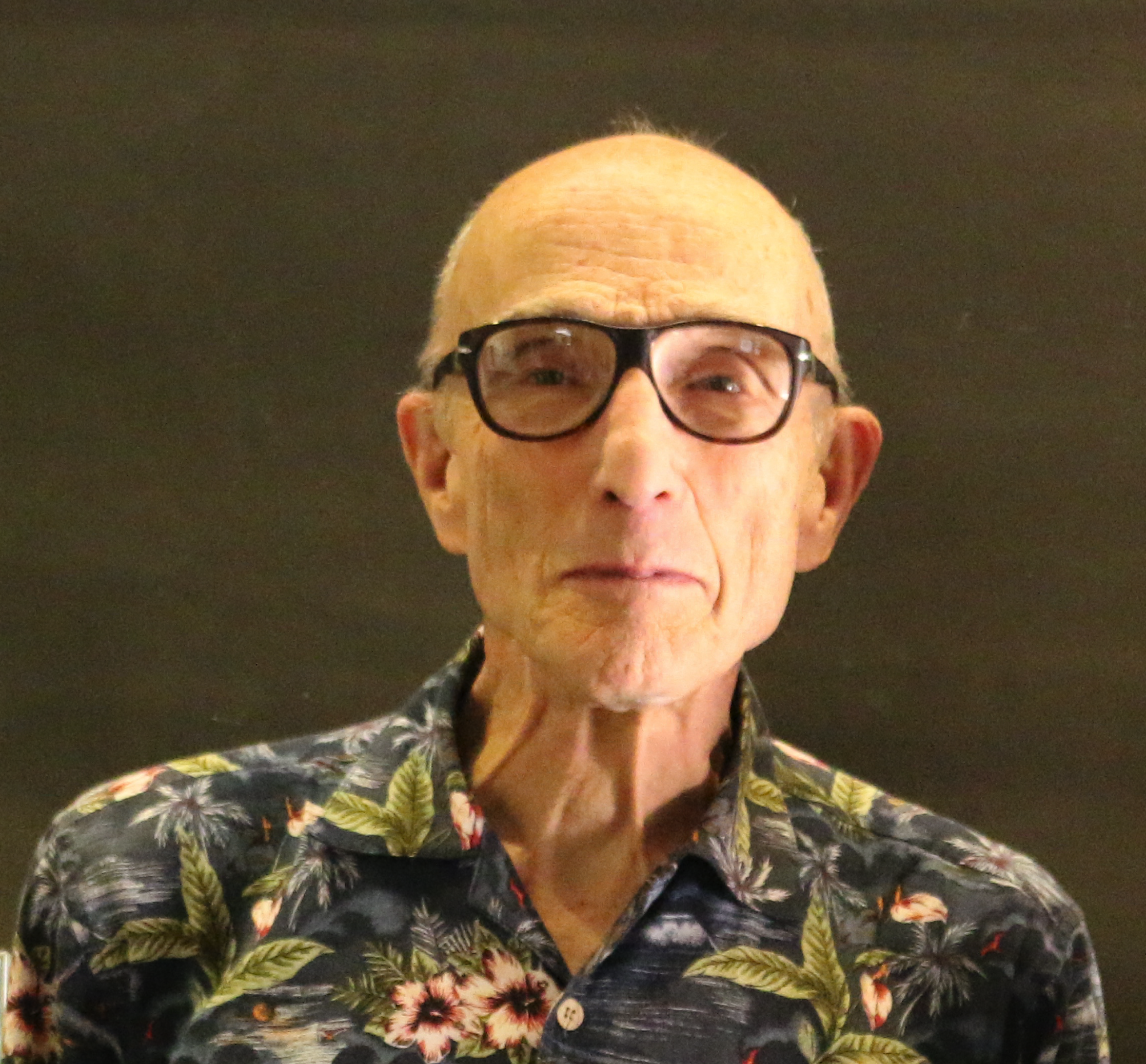
- Born: 1940 (age 85–86); Chicago, Illinois, U.S.
- Education: Amherst College (BA); Harvard University (MA, PhD)
- Known for: runaway greenhouse effect, atmospheric dynamics
- Awards: NASA Exceptional Scientific Achievement Medal (1981), Fellow of the American Academy of Arts and Sciences (1997), Gerard P. Kuiper Prize (2007)

Andrew Perry Ingersoll (born 1940) is an American physicist. He is a professor of planetary science at the California Institute of Technology. Ingersoll was elected to the American Academy of Arts and Sciences in 1997. He received the lifetime achievement award in planetary science, the Gerard P. Kuiper Prize, in 2007. He proposed the runaway greenhouse effect and is known for his research on planetary atmospheres and climate.

== Biography ==
He was born in Chicago, Illinois, in 1940 and moved to Brooklyn as a child, graduating from high school there at age 16. He received his bachelor's degree from Amherst College in 1960 and his master's degree from Harvard in 1961. He received his Ph.D. of Physics from Harvard University in 1966, focusing on geophysical fluid dynamics.

After his graduation, he joined Caltech as an assistant professor in the Planetary Science department in 1966. He became an associate professor in 1971 and a full professor in 1976. He was the Earle C. Anthony Professor of Planetary Science at Caltech from 2003 to 2011. He has made significant contributions to understanding planetary atmospheres, including fundamental studies on the runaway greenhouse effect on Venus, and atmospheric physics on giant planets and the Earth.

He has been a leader in the investigation of planetary weather and climate, particularly on giant planets and the Earth, for nearly five decades. He has been a key player on the instrument teams for many NASA/JPL missions, including Pioneer Venus, Pioneer Saturn, Voyager, Mars Global Surveyor, Galileo, and Cassini.

He has been interviewed about his research on the Science Channel documentary "The Planets". He is the author of the book Planetary Climates.

== Honors and awards ==
Among many other awards, he received the Gerard P. Kuiper Prize for outstanding lifetime achievement in planetary science in 2007, the NASA Exceptional Scientific Achievement Medal in 1981 for his work on the Voyager program, and was elected as a fellow of the American Academy of Arts and Sciences in 1997.

He was elected a Legacy Fellow of the American Astronomical Society in 2020.
