= 1252 Celestia =

Main-belt asteroid

Discovery
- Discovered by: F. L. Whipple
- Discovery site: Oak Ridge Obs.
- Discovery date: 19 February 1933

Designations
- Named after: Celestia Whipple (discoverer's mother)
- Alternative designations: 1933 DG · 1934 PA_{1}
- Minor planet category: main-belt · (middle); Pallas · background

Orbital characteristics
- Epoch 27 April 2019 (JD 2458600.5)
- Uncertainty parameter 0
- Observation arc: 85.57 yr (31,254 d)
- Aphelion: 3.2535 AU
- Perihelion: 2.1350 AU
- Semi-major axis: 2.6943 AU
- Eccentricity: 0.2076
- Orbital period (sidereal): 4.42 yr (1,615 d)
- Mean anomaly: 137.14°
- Mean motion: 0° 13^{m} 22.44^{s} / day
- Inclination: 33.839°
- Longitude of ascending node: 140.91°
- Argument of perihelion: 63.589°

Physical characteristics
- Mean diameter: 17.39±1.6 km 19.037±0.304 km 20.36±0.69 km 21.542±0.155 km 21.56±0.95 km
- Synodic rotation period: 10.636 h
- Geometric albedo: 0.167; 0.1714; 0.193; 0.215; 0.2573
- Spectral type: Tholen = S SMASS = S B–V = 0.890; U–B = 0.425
- Absolute magnitude (H): 10.89

1252 Celestia, provisional designation 1933 DG, is a stony asteroid located in the central asteroid belt. It was discovered on 19 February 1933, by astronomer Fred Whipple at the Oak Ridge Observatory operated by the Harvard-Smithsonian Center for Astrophysics in Massachusetts, United States. The S-type asteroid has a rotation period of 10.6 hours and measures approximately 20 kilometers (12 miles) in diameter. It was named after the discoverer's mother, Celestia MacFarland Whipple.

== Orbit and classification ==
According to a synthetic HCM-analysis by Nesvorný, Celestia is a member of the Pallas family (801), a small asteroid family of less than 200 known members with inclined orbits. The family is named after 2 Pallas. However, in a HCM-analysis by Milani and Knežević, Celestia belongs to the background population.

The asteroid orbits the Sun in the central main-belt at a distance of 2.1–3.3 AU once every 4 years and 5 months (1,615 days; semi-major axis of 2.69 AU). Its orbit has an eccentricity of 0.21 and an inclination of 34° with respect to the ecliptic. The body's observation arc begins at the Yerkes Observatory in April 1933, or two months after its official discovery observation at Oak Ridge.

== Naming ==
This minor planet was named after the mother of the discoverer, Celestia MacFarland Whipple. The official naming citation was mentioned in The Names of the Minor Planets by Paul Herget in 1955 (H 115).

== Physical characteristics ==
In the Tholen and SMASS classification, Celestia is a common stony S-type asteroid, while in SMASS-like taxonomy of the Small Solar System Objects Spectroscopic Survey (S3OS2), it is a Sl-subtype that transitions from the S-type to the L-type asteroids. Celestia's stony spectral type does not agree with those determined for the members of the Pallas family, which are typically "bright" carbonaceous B-type asteroids.

=== Rotation period ===
In February and March 1995, a rotational lightcurve of Celestia was obtained from photometric observations at the Paul Feder Observatory by Walter Worman of Moorhead State University. Lightcurve analysis gave a rotation period of 10.636 hours with a brightness amplitude of 0.26 magnitude (U=3). An alternative period determination by René Roy of 12 hours was based on a fragmentary lightcurve and received a poor rating (U=1).

=== Diameter and albedo ===
According to the surveys carried out by the Infrared Astronomical Satellite IRAS, the Japanese Akari satellite and the NEOWISE mission of NASA's Wide-field Infrared Survey Explorer, Celestia measures between 17.39 and 21.56 kilometers in diameter and its surface has an albedo between 0.167 and 0.2573. The Collaborative Asteroid Lightcurve Link adopts the results obtained by IRAS, that is, an albedo of 0.2573 and a diameter of 17.39 kilometers based on an absolute magnitude of 10.89.
