= William Ward (astronomer) =

American astronomer

William Roger Ward
- Born: January 11, 1944; Kansas City, Kansas
- Died: September 20, 2018 (aged 74); Prescott, Arizona
- Education: Ph.D.
- Alma mater: University of Missouri; California Institute of Technology
- Known for: Planetary migration theory
- Spouse: Sandra Kay
- Children: 3
- Awards: NASA Exceptional Scientific Achievement Medal; Brouwer Award; Gerard P. Kuiper Prize
- Scientific career
- Fields: Planetary formation
- Thesis: The Formation of Planetesimals (1972)
- Doctoral advisor: Peter Goldreich

William Roger Ward (January 11, 1944 – September 20, 2018) was an American astronomer.

Born in Kansas City, Kansas, Ward studied mathematics and physics at University of Missouri, and completed a doctoral degree at California Institute of Technology in 1972. He became an astronomy theoretician, studying how planetary systems formed and evolved. His career began at the Harvard's Center for Astrophysics, then he moved to the Jet Propulsion Laboratory in 1977. In 1998 he joined the Southwest Research Institute branch located in Boulder, Colorado. He retired in 2014.

Over the course of his research career, he received the Brouwer Award from the Division on Dynamical Astronomy of the American Astronomical Society in 2003, and the Gerard P. Kuiper Prize in 2011. He was granted fellowship by the American Geophysical Union (2005), the American Association for the Advancement of Science (2006), and the American Academy of Arts and Sciences (2012). In 2015, he became a member of the National Academy of Sciences. Ward died of a brain tumor in Prescott, Arizona on September 20, 2018.
