= Stanton J. Peale =

American astrophysicist, planetary scientist (1937–2015)

- Born: Stanton Jerrold Peale; January 23, 1937; Indianapolis, Indiana, US
- Died: May 14, 2015 (aged 78); Santa Barbara, California, US
- Education: Cornell University
- Awards: Newcomb Cleveland Prize (1979); James Craig Watson Medal Award for Contributions to Astronomy (1982), Brouwer Award (1992); National Academy of Sciences (2009); Kuiper Prize (2016)
- Scientific career
- Fields: Astrophysics, planetary science
- Workplaces: Cornell University, University of California, Los Angeles, University of California, Santa Barbara

Stanton Jerrold Peale (January 23, 1937 – May 14, 2015) was an American astrophysicist, planetary scientist, and Professor at the University of California, Santa Barbara. His research interests include the geophysical and dynamical properties of planets and exoplanets.

== Career ==
Stanton J. Peale received a Ph.D. in astronomy from Cornell University in 1965, where he worked with Thomas Gold. He was an assistant professor of astronomy at UCLA before moving to UCSB in 1968.

== Scientific contributions ==
In 1969 Peale published a generalization of Cassini's laws that explain the rotation of the Moon and other bodies subject to tides.

In 1976 Peale published a procedure to determine the size and state of the core of Mercury.

In 1979 Peale and collaborators predicted that Jupiter's satellite Io might show widespread volcanism as a result of the action of tides. This prediction was confirmed in 1979 by data from the Voyager 1 mission which showed that Io is the most volcanically active body in the Solar System.

He died on May 14, 2015, in Santa Barbara, California.

== Honors ==
- Newcomb Cleveland Prize (1979)
- James Craig Watson Medal Award for Contributions to Astronomy (1982)
- Brouwer Award (1992)
- National Academy of Sciences (2009)
- Kuiper Prize (2016)
