= C/1955 O1 (Honda) =

Parabolic comet

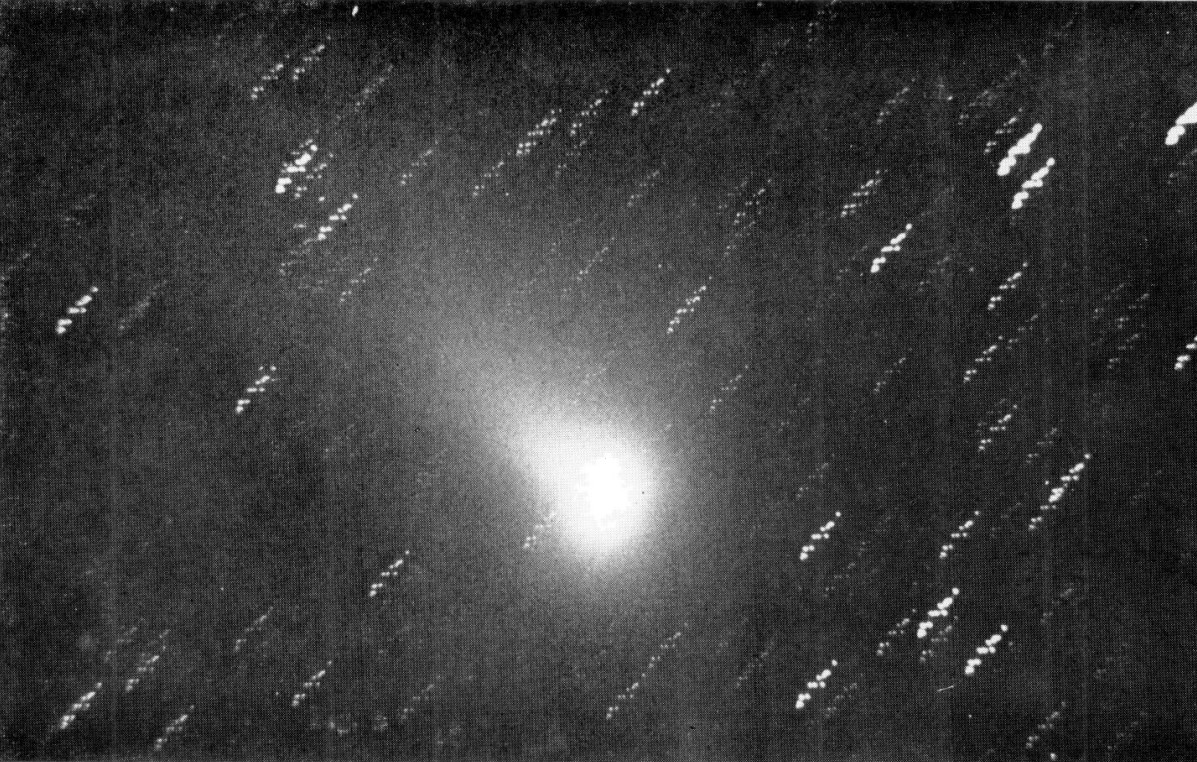
- Honda's Comet photographed by Paolo Maffei from Italy on 23 August 1955.

Discovery
- Discovered by: Minoru Honda
- Discovery site: Kurashiki, Japan
- Discovery date: 29 July 1955

Designations
- Alternative designations: 1955 V, 1955g

Orbital characteristics
- Epoch: 9 September 1955 (JD 2435359.5)
- Observation arc: 96 days
- Number of observations: 43
- Perihelion: 0.885 AU
- Eccentricity: 1.00111
- Inclination: 107.52°
- Longitude of ascending node: 339.42°
- Argument of periapsis: 348.20°
- Mean anomaly: 0.002°
- Last perihelion: 4 August 1955
- Earth MOID: 0.114 AU
- Jupiter MOID: 3.233 AU

Physical characteristics
- Mean radius: 1.04 km (0.65 mi) (Note: Calculated mean radius using the formula: $\log_{10}\,(\,R\,)\ =\;0.9 +\;0.13 (\,H\,)$ Where $\,H\,$ is the comet's absolute total magnitude (M1))
- Comet total magnitude (M1): 6.8
- Comet nuclear magnitude (M2): 11.5
- Apparent magnitude: 5.0 (1955 apparition)

C/1955 O1 (Honda) is a non-periodic comet that made its closest approach to Earth on 18 August 1955, at a distance of 0.272 AU (40.7 million km). It is one of several comets discovered by Japanese astronomer, Minoru Honda.

== Observational history ==
=== Discovery ===
Minoru Honda found his seventh comet overall on the night of 29 July 1955, as a diffuse 8th-magnitude object within the constellation Orion. (Note: Reported initial position upon discovery was: α = 4^{h} 49.2^{m} , δ = –2° 33′)

=== Follow-up observations ===
The comet barely reached naked eye visibility starting on 24 August 1955. By September 1955, it reached peak brightness at magnitude 5.0, believed to be caused by a large outburst that was initially thought to be the comet's fragmentation/splitting event.

It was last seen by Max Beyer on 20 November 1955, as a 13th-magnitude object within the constellation Hercules. Elizabeth Roemer and Hamilton Jeffers attempted to recover the comet from the Lick Observatory between February and March 1956 but failed to locate it.

== Orbit ==
A 2022 study calculated that C/1955 O1 has a minimum orbit intersection distance of around 0.099 AU (14.8 million km) with 50000 Quaoar.
