= 45P/Honda–Mrkos–Pajdušáková =

Periodic comet with 5 year orbit

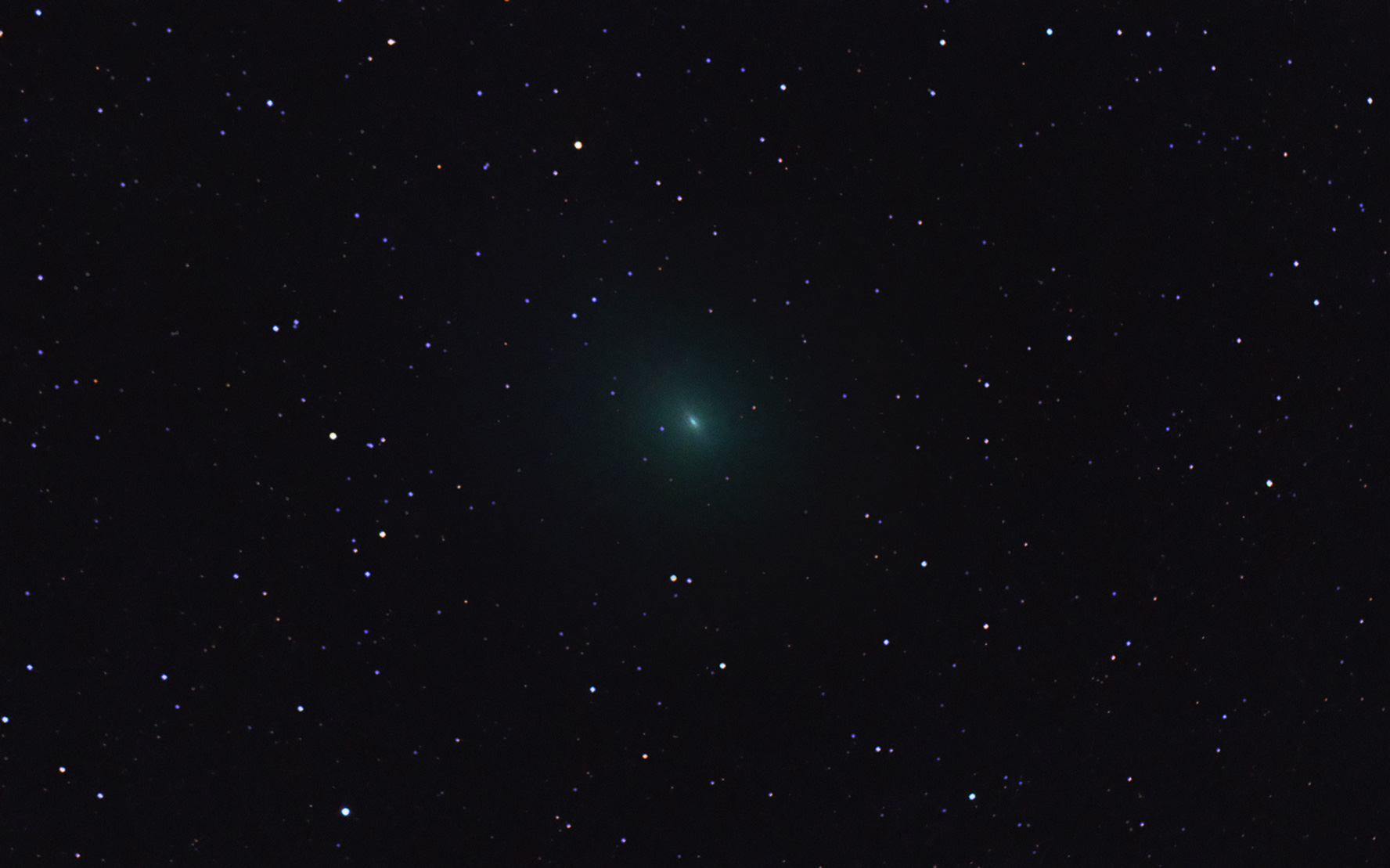
- Comet Honda–Mrkos–Pajdušáková on February 10, 2017

Discovery
- Discovered by: Minoru Honda
- Discovery date: December 3, 1948

Designations
- Pronunciation: /ˈhɒndə ˈmɜːrkɒs ˌpaɪduːʃəˈkoʊvə/

Orbital characteristics
- Epoch: 2025-11-21 (JD 2461000.5)
- Aphelion: 5.56 AU
- Perihelion: 0.558 AU
- Semi-major axis: 3.06 AU
- Eccentricity: 0.817
- Orbital period: 5.34 yr
- Inclination: 4.32°
- Last perihelion: April 26, 2022; December 31, 2016; September 28, 2011
- Next perihelion: 2027-Aug-30
- Earth MOID: 0.06 AU (9.0 million km)
- Jupiter MOID: 0.105 AU (15.7 million km)

Physical characteristics
- Dimensions: 1.3 km
- Synodic rotation period: 7.6±0.5 hours

45P/Honda–Mrkos–Pajdušáková is a short-period comet discovered by Minoru Honda December 3, 1948. It is named after Minoru Honda, Antonín Mrkos, and Ľudmila Pajdušáková. The object revolves around the Sun on an elliptical orbit with a period of 5.25 years. The nucleus is 1.3 kilometers in diameter. On August 19 and 20, 2011, it became the fifteenth comet detected by ground radar telescope.

By May 2027, the comet should be around apparent magnitude 14. The comet reaches perihelion on 30 August 2027, when it should brighten to magnitude 5-8.

During the 1995 perihelion passage, the comet was visible to Solar and Heliospheric Observatory (SOHO) on January 16, 1996, when the comet was around apparent magnitude 7 and 4.3° from the Sun.

It is green because it emits diatomic carbon which glows green in the near vacuum of space.

== 2011 passage ==
During the 2011 perihelion passage, the comet was recovered on 5 June at magnitude 21. On 8 July, the comet had a magnitude of approximately 18, and, as of 22 July, nuclear condensation was noticed around magnitude 16. It was expected to reach a peak magnitude of around 7.3 in late September near perihelion.

On August 15, 2011, the comet made a close approach of only 0.0600 AU (8,980,000 km; 5,580,000 mi) from the Earth and it was studied by the Goldstone Deep Space Network. Radar observations on August 19 and 20 detected echoes from the nucleus and coma.

== 2017 passage ==
45P/Honda–Mrkos–Pajdušáková came to perihelion on December 31, 2016. By February 4, 2017, it was around magnitude 7 and the coma was about 100,000 km across. The comet required binoculars to be seen because of the low surface brightness. The comet passed 0.08318 AU (12,444,000 km; 7,732,000 mi) from Earth on February 11, 2017, which was the same day as a lunar eclipse.

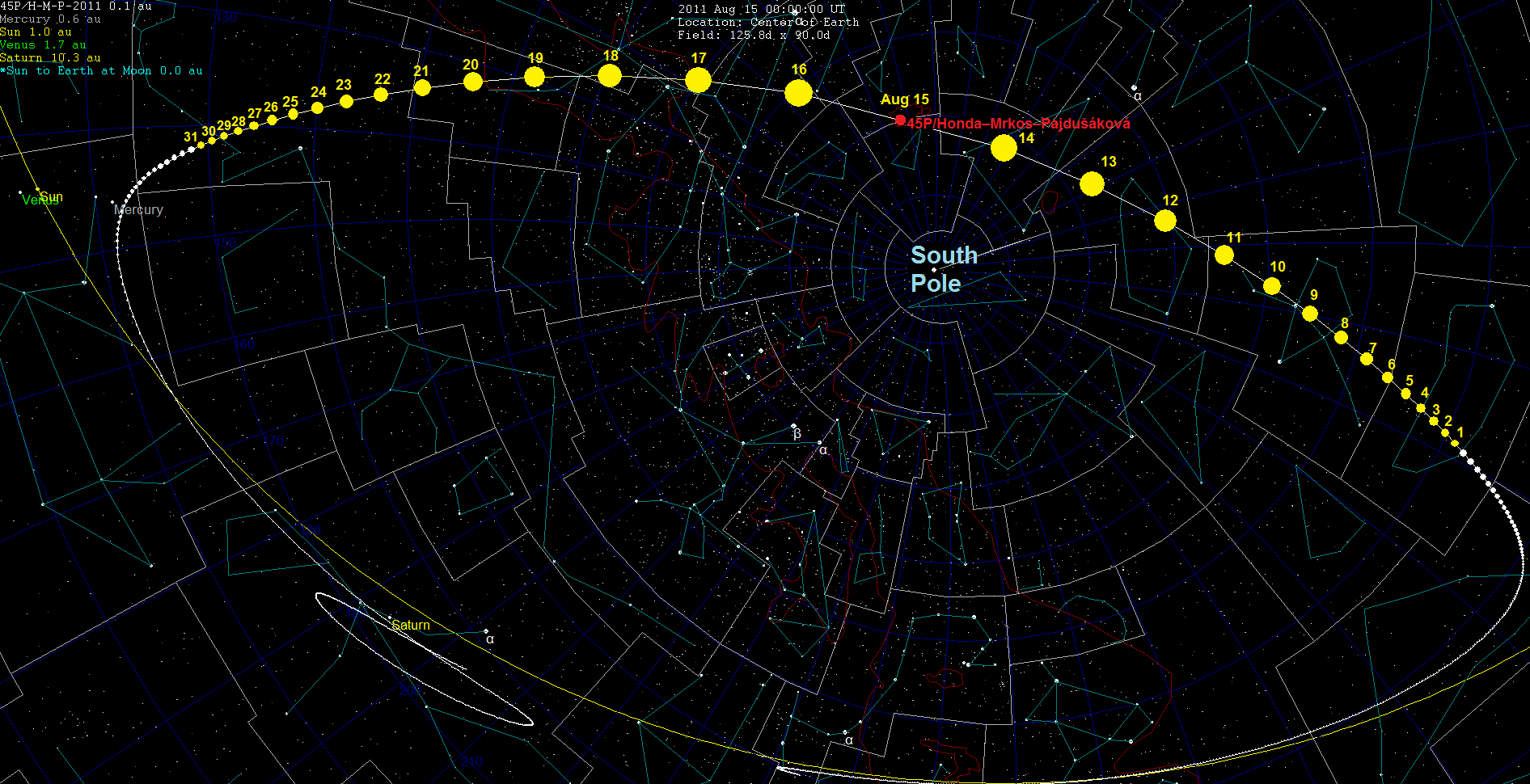
This shows the path of the comet during August 2011, with daily motion drawn as spheres, scaled for relative distance from earth.

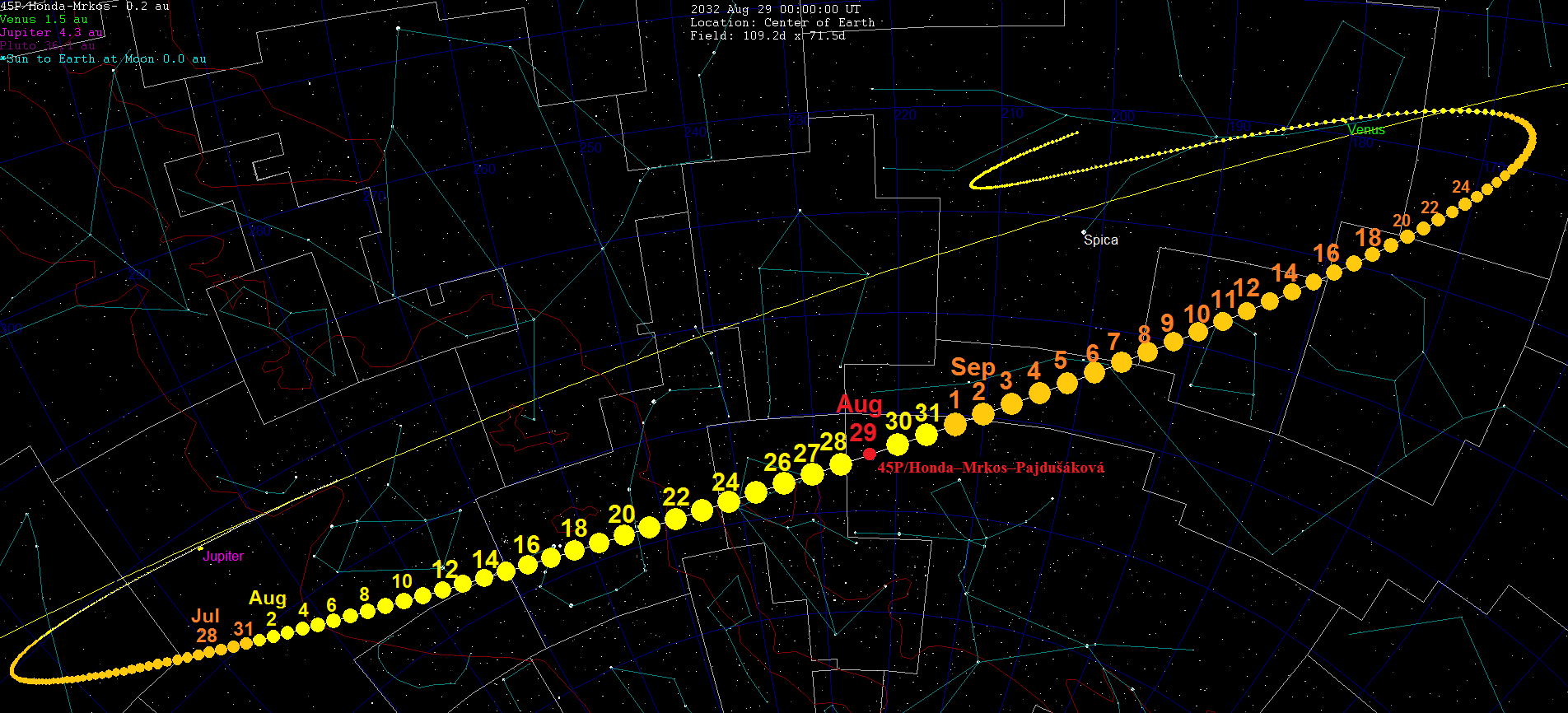
The next notable close approach to Earth will occur in October 2032

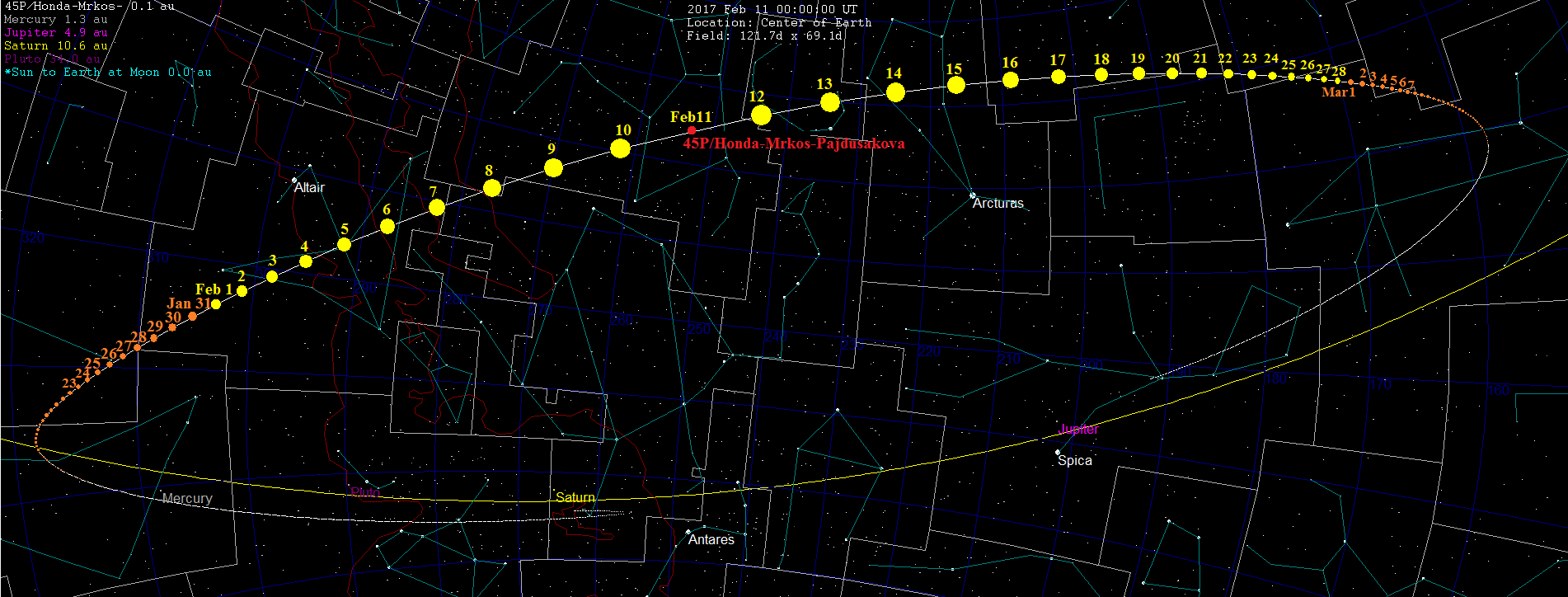
This shows the path of the comet during January through March 2017, with daily motion drawn as spheres, scaled for relative distance from earth.

The next notable close approach will be in October 2032 when the comet might brighten to magnitude 7.

== August Delta Capricornids ==
On 16 August 2022 the global CAMS and Sonotaco network detected a modest outburst of meteors with an orbit that resembled comet 45P. The shower received the temporary designation of M2022-Q1, and was later permanently named the August Delta Capricornids. The meteors had an entry speed of 24.4 km/s and originated from the border of Aquarius and Capricornus with R.A. 21:40 and a declination of –11.9°. This was the first time an encounter with a dust trail of 45P has been confirmed and it came from the 1980 meteoroid stream of 45P. In all, 137 meteors were triangulated by the global CAMS networks.

Numbered comets
| Previous; 44P/Reinmuth | 45P/Honda–Mrkos–Pajdušáková | Next; 46P/Wirtanen |
