= C/1942 X1 (Whipple–Fedtke–Tevzadze) =

Non-periodic comet

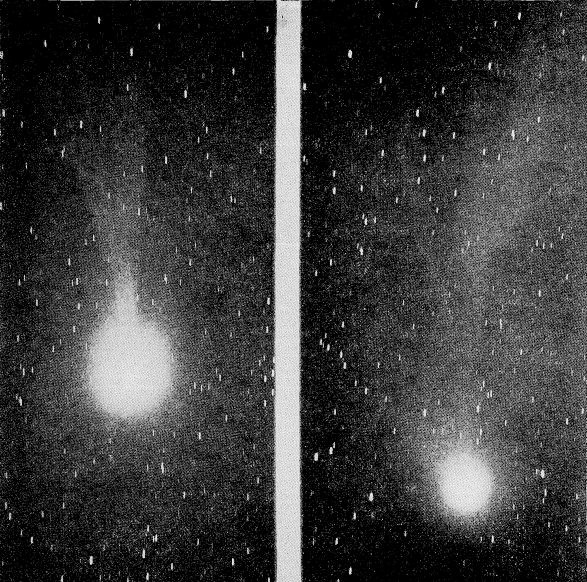
- The comet on 27–28 January 1943 viewed from the 24-inch reflector of the Yerkes Observatory.

Discovery
- Discovered by: Fred Whipple; Carl Fedtke; Giorgi A. Tevzadze
- Discovery date: 8 December 1942

Designations
- Alternative designations: 1943 I

Orbital characteristics
- Epoch: 5 February 1943 (JD 2430760.5)
- Observation arc: 257 days
- Earliest precovery date: 5 November 1942
- Number of observations: 166
- Aphelion: ~346 AU
- Perihelion: 1.354 AU
- Semi-major axis: ~173 AU
- Eccentricity: 0.9922
- Orbital period: ~1,590 years (inbound); ~2,070 years (outbound)
- Inclination: 19.713°
- Longitude of ascending node: 100.79°
- Argument of periapsis: 39.843°
- Mean anomaly: –0.001°
- Last perihelion: 6 February 1943
- T_{Jupiter}: 1.385

Physical characteristics
- Apparent magnitude: 3.2–3.95 (1943 apparition)

C/1942 X1 (Whipple–Fedtke–Tevzadze) is a non-periodic comet discovered on 8 December 1942 by Fred Whipple and independently, by Carl Fedtke and Giorgi A. Tevzadze.

== Observational history ==
Fred Whipple discovered the comet in patrol plates from Harvard College Observatory exposed on 8.24 December 1942. The comet was estimated to be magnitude 10. Whipple searched in other patrol plates for the comet and found it in 20 more plates, the earliest of which dated from 5 November. The comet was then magnitude 12. Carl Fedtke from Konigsberg discovered it independently on 11 December 1942, while, due to communications break-down during World War II, Giorgi A. Tevzadze from Abastumani Astrophysical Observatory, Georgia, found the comet on 28 December without knowing it was already discovered.

In early January 1943 the comet was estimated to have an apparent magnitude of 6, while its tail was estimated to be about half a degree long. M. Beyer of Hamburg Observatory, Bergedorf, Germany, spotted the comet with the naked eye on 8 January, estimating its magnitude to be 5.5. The closest approach to Earth took place on 25 January 1943, at a distance of 0.43 AU. At that date its magnitude was estimated to be between 3.8 and 5 and its tail extended for 1.6 degrees. The perihelion was on 6 February 1943, at 1.35 AU. N. I. Tchudovitchev from Engelhardt Observatory photographed the comet revealing its tail was 6 degrees long.

The comet exhibited a sudden rise in magnitude on 21 February. On 24 February, its magnitude was estimated to be 3.2 to 3.95 and its tail extended for 6.5 degrees while its coma was 27 arcminutes across. The tail in photographs exhibited several knots in February and March. On 4 March, the magnitude of the comet was estimated to be between 4.2 and 5.1, on 15 March was estimated to be between 4.5 and 5.2, and on 30 March between 5.2 and 5.8. The tail extended for half a degree. Apart from the 24 February outburst, the apparent magnitude seen to rise above the expected also on 24 March, 23 April, 23 May and 21 June.

The comet continued to fade and on 29 April its magnitude was estimated to be between 6.7 and 7.2 and the tail was 0.6 degrees long. In early June its magnitude was about 9. It was last detected on 2 August 1943.

== Scientific results ==
The spectrum of the comet was obtained between 24 February and 9 March 1943. The comet exhibited strong cyanide (CN) and methylene (CH_{2}) lines, stronger than the diatomic carbon lines (Swan band), which were less intense than usual. The λ4315 band associated with methylidyne (CH) was also present, although weak. The λ3883 0-0 CN line was complex and could be resolved into individual lines.
