= C/1942 C1 (Whipple–Bernasconi–Kulin) =

Parabolic comet

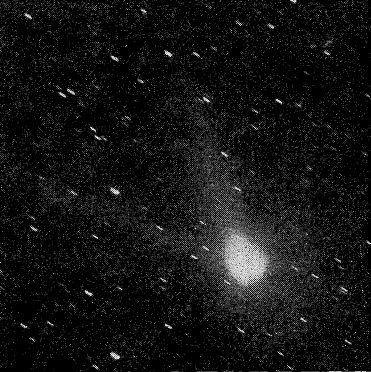
- Comet W–B–K photographed by George van Biesbroeck on 10 March 1942.

Discovery
- Discovered by: Fred L. Whipple; Giovanni Bernasconi; György Kulin
- Discovery site: Harvard, USA; Como, Italy; Konkoly, Hungary
- Discovery date: 25 January 1942; 10–13 February 1942

Designations
- Alternative designations: 1942 IV, 1942a

Orbital characteristics
- Epoch: 29 March 1942 (JD 2430447.5)
- Observation arc: 70 days
- Earliest precovery date: 28 December 1941
- Number of observations: 8
- Perihelion: 1.445 AU
- Eccentricity: 1.00102
- Inclination: 79.454°
- Longitude of ascending node: 340.93°
- Argument of periapsis: 223.41°
- Mean anomaly: –0.001°
- Last perihelion: 30 April 1942
- Earth MOID: 0.622 AU
- Jupiter MOID: 1.615 AU

Physical characteristics
- Comet total magnitude (M1): 4.4
- Comet nuclear magnitude (M2): 8.6
- Apparent magnitude: 5.92 (1942 apparition)

Comet Whipple–Bernasconi–Kulin, formally designated as C/1942 C1, is a non-periodic comet that was observed from December 1941 to January 1943. It was independently discovered by three astronomers, Fred Lawrence Whipple, Giovanni Bernasconi and György Kulin, respectively.

== See also ==
- C/1948 L1 (Honda–Bernasconi)
