= Fred Lawrence Whipple =

American astronomer (1906–2004)

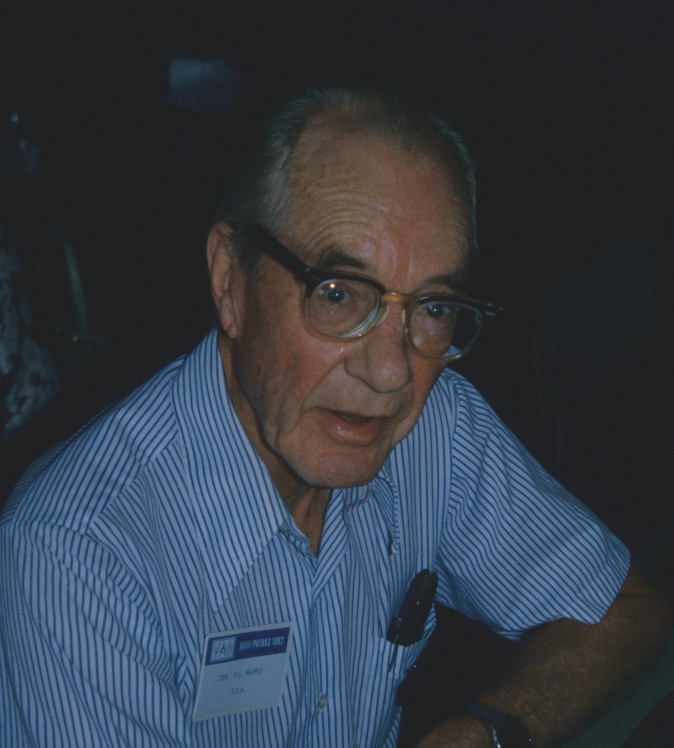
- Whipple in 1982
- Born: November 5, 1906; Red Oak, Iowa, U.S.
- Died: August 30, 2004 (aged 97); Cambridge, Massachusetts, U.S.
- Education: University of California, Los Angeles; University of California, Berkeley
- Known for: Composition of comets Whipple shield Operation Moonwatch
- Scientific career
- Fields: Astronomy
- Workplaces: Harvard College Observatory, Harvard–Smithsonian Center for Astrophysics
- Thesis: A Spectrophotometric Study of the Cepheid Variables η Aquilae and δ Cephei (1931)
- Doctoral advisor: Donald Menzel, Armin Leuschner
- Doctoral students: Leland Cunningham; James W. Warwick; Harlan James Smith; Frances Woodworth Wright; Joseph Veverka

Minor planets discovered: 1
| 1252 Celestia | 19 February 1933 | list |

Comets discovered: 6
| C/1932 P1^{[1]} | 6 August 1932 |
| 36P/Whipple | 15 October 1933 |
| C/1937 C1 | 7 February 1937 |
| C/1940 O1^{[2]} | 8 August 1940 |
| C/1942 C1^{[3]} | 25 January 1942 |
| C/1942 X1^{[4]} | 8 December 1942 |
1. ^{1} with Leslie C. Peltier; 2. ^{2} with John S. Paraskevopoulos; 3. ^{3} with Giovanni Bernasconi and György Kulin; 4. ^{4} with Carl Fedtke and G. A. Tevzadze

Fred Lawrence Whipple (November 5, 1906 – August 30, 2004) was an American astronomer, who worked at the Harvard College Observatory for more than 70 years. Among his achievements were asteroid and comet discoveries, the "dirty snowball" hypothesis of comets, and the invention of the Whipple shield.

== Early life and education ==
Fred Lawrence Whipple was born on November 5, 1906, in Red Oak, Iowa. His parents were farmers. His father, Harry Lawrence Whipple, was of English ancestry; his mother, Celeste MacFarland Whipple, was of Scottish and Irish ancestry. Harry Whipple served as an elder in a Presbyterian church. Fred's younger brother died when he was four. When Fred was 15, the family moved to Long Beach, California, where his father opened a grocery store. An early bout with polio ended his ambition of being a professional tennis player. Whipple studied at Occidental College in Southern California, but after one semester there he transferred to the University of California at Los Angeles where he majored in mathematics, graduating in 1927. Recollecting his path from mathematics to astronomy, Whipple stated in a 1978 autobiography that his "mathematics major veered [him] through physics and finally focused on astronomy where time, space, mathematics, and physics had a common meeting ground."

Whipple became bored with mathematics, and after taking a class in astronomy, taught by Frederick C. Leonard, he enrolled at the University of California, Berkeley, where he obtained a PhD in Astronomy in 1931, working in the Lick Observatory. He became interested in comet orbits calculations, which was a long and difficult process at the time. His first published result was the calculation of the 29P/Schwassmann–Wachmann orbit. In 1930, he helped to map the orbit of the then newly discovered planet Pluto. Whipple's thesis was on the cepheid variables, titled A Spectrophotometric Study of the Cepheid Variables η Aquilae and δ Cephei. The measurements he got were 3 times larger than theoretically possible under the Cepheid period–luminosity law; Whipple concluded that the theory "had to be wrong". He did not try to formulate new theory, he later said that it "simply disgusted him".

== Career ==
Whipple joined Harvard College Observatory in 1931. From 1950 until 1977 he was a professor of Astronomy at Harvard University, including being the Phillips Professor of Astronomy between 1968 and 1977, succeeding Cecilia Payne-Gaposchkin. In his early years in Harvard, Whipple was interested in galaxies, and soon published "color indices for 38 galaxies in the Coma-Virgo region, confirming an earlier suggestion that galaxies were redder than average stars of corresponding spectral type". He wanted to continue these studies, but the then director Harlow Shapley "did not welcome competition in galactic studies". Whipple published several articles together with Cecilia Payne-Gaposchkin in 1935 and with Jesse Greenstein in 1937. When Whipple read an article by Ernst Öpik on comets and meteors he became interested in determining meteor trajectories. Whipple developed a "photographic tracking network" to observe meteors in 1936-1937, which continued as the Harvard Photographic Meteor Program. In 1955, he established the Harvard Radio Meteor Project. In 1960s, he showed that most meteors originate within the Solar System rather than from interstellar space, and have comet-like trajectories.

In 1933, Whipple discovered the periodic comet 36P/Whipple and the asteroid 1252 Celestia, which he named after his mother. The official naming citation was mentioned in The Names of the Minor Planets by Paul Herget in 1955 (H 115). He also discovered or co-discovered five other non-periodic comets, the first of which was C/1932 P1 Peltier-Whipple, while his last was C/1942 X1 (Whipple–Fedtke–Tevzadze). In 1939 he also discovered BT Mon, a ninth-magnitude nova "on a spectrum plate taken by Bart Bok".

During World War II, he invented a device for cutting aluminum tinfoil into chaff, a radar countermeasure; his device "would turn 3 ounces of aluminum foil into 3000 half-wave dipoles, and he also found optimum aspect ratios for the foil strips that would work over a range of radar frequencies". Brian G. Marsden called the device "essentially a type of lawn mower". For this invention, Whipple was called the "Chief of Chaff", and was awarded a Certificate of Merit in 1948. In 1946, Whipple invented a "meteoroid bumper", now known as "Whipple shield", a device to protect spacecraft from impact by small particles by breaking them up, eleven years before the first artificial satellite, Sputnik 1, was launched into space.

After the war, the US Army experimented with German V-2 rockets, inviting Whipple to take part in test flights from White Sands Missile Range. There, he befriended Wernher von Braun. Both men "promoted an understanding of space matters by the public", and wrote several popular articles about space exploration for the Collier's together. One article was about a crewed flight to the Moon; by their estimates, it "could happen within 25 years". In another article Whipple proposed to put a telescope into space.

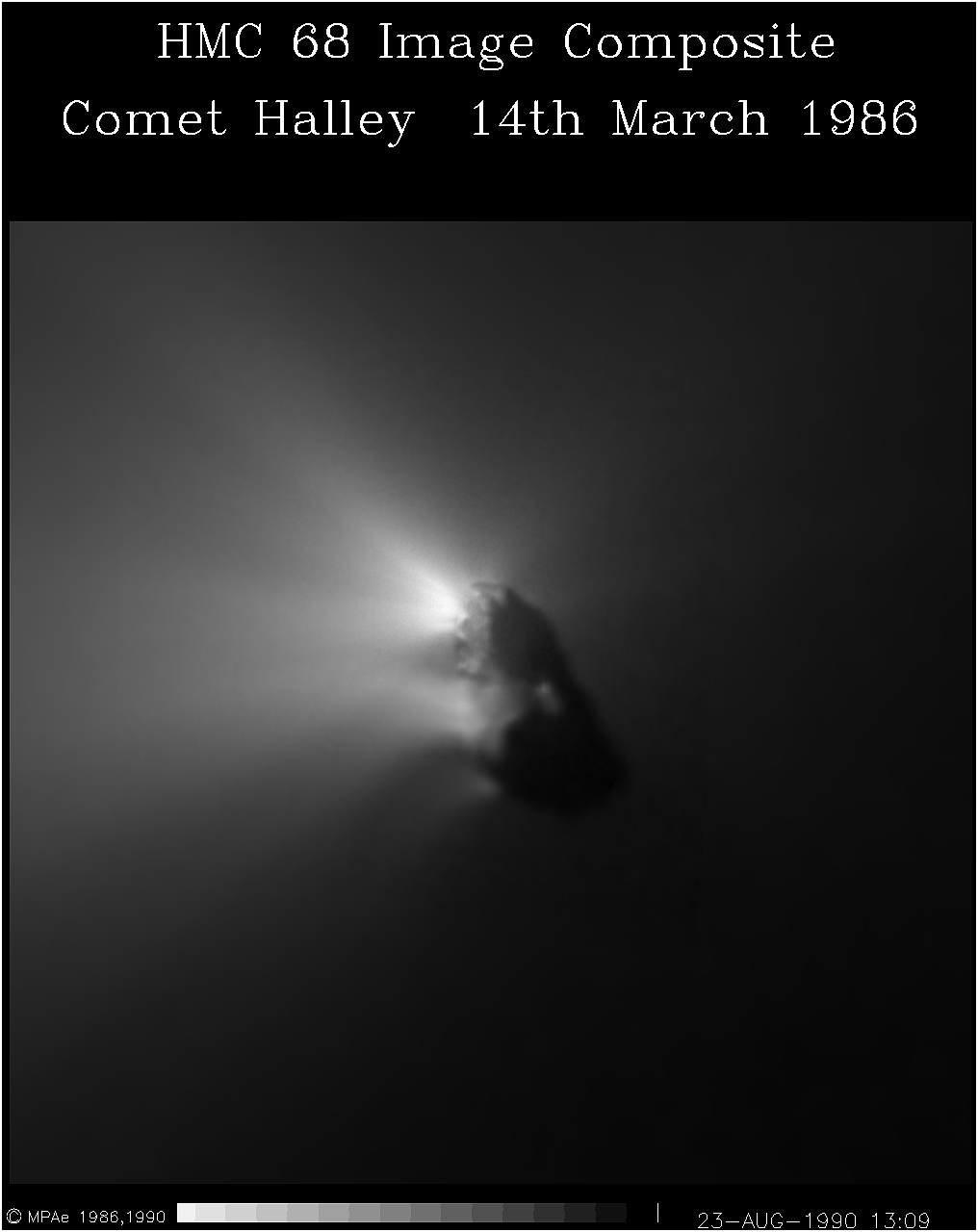
Halley's Comet at Giotto's closest approach, 1986

In 1950, Whipple wrote a series of influential papers entitled A Comet Model, published in the Astrophysical Journal, where he proposed the "icy conglomerate" hypothesis of comet composition (later called the "dirty snowball" hypothesis). Criticized at first, the hypothesis was mostly confirmed when ESA's Giotto photographed the Halley's Comet in 1986. Before Whipple, it was believed that comets "were balls of sand held together by gravity". Whipple was best-known for his work on comets, and was even nicknamed Dr. Comet by the press. Whipple's articles on comets were called "the most-cited works in the Astrophysical Journal during the past half century". In 1986 he was one of the guests at the Space Research Institute during the Halley's comet Vega program flybys.

In 1954, Whipple was invited to participate in a meeting at the Office of Naval Research regarding the first US artificial satellite. After the meeting, Whipple became the head of Project Orbiter, which proposed to launch it in 1955. The project was not chosen for development; no satellite was launched in 1955.

Whipple became director of the Smithsonian Astrophysical Observatory (SAO) in 1955, and remained in this post until 1973. During Whipple's directorship, Smithsonian and Harvard observatories merged into joint Harvard–Smithsonian Center for Astrophysics (CfA). Whipple also chose Mount Hopkins as a site for the new telescope in collaboration with the University of Arizona. He also helped to design the new telescope, the Multiple Mirror Telescope, which became operational in 1979. In 1981, the observatory was renamed to Fred Lawrence Whipple Observatory in his honor.

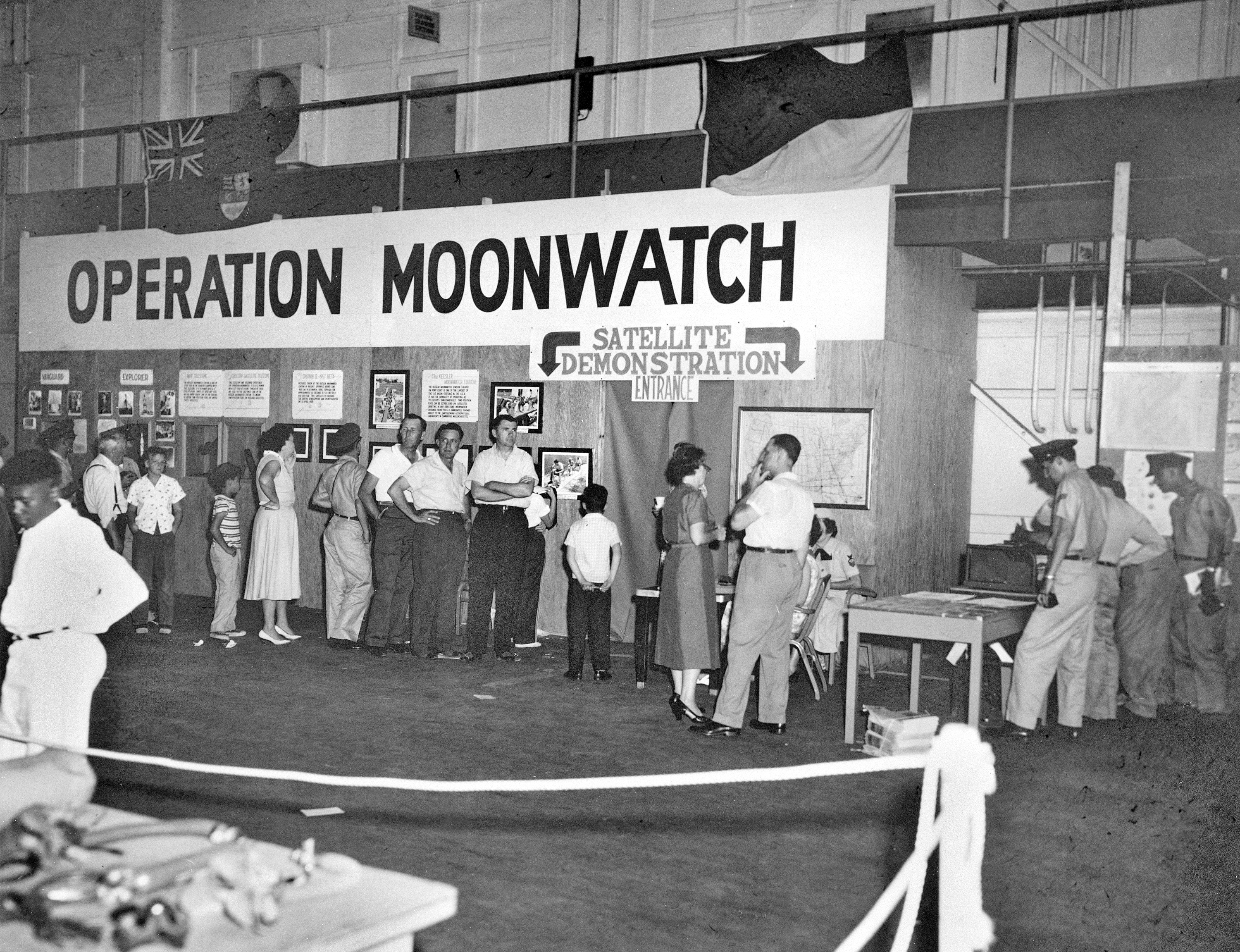
Under a banner for Operation Moonwatch, people are lined up at the entrance to a Satellite Demonstration set up in Biloxi, Mississippi, 1958.

In preparation for the International Geophysical Year, Whipple organized a SAO network of widefield Baker-Nunn cameras with the goal of precise tracking of satellites "with the intention of improving the global geodetic uncertainty from hundreds of meters to 10 meters". As a backup, Whipple also organized a network of amateur astronomers, called Operation Moonwatch; it was the only group able to track Sputnik. There were more than 200 groups in several countries; several of them operated until 1970s. The SAO network "proved so successful that the precision tracking of these satellites could be used to model the Earth's shape and density variations from the observed gravitational effects upon these satellite orbits."

In 1968, Whipple became the principal investigator of the Project Celescope on the Orbiting Astronomical Observatory 2, the first successful space telescope. In 1999, Whipple became the oldest scientist involved in a NASA project, working on the CONTOUR mission to a comet, led by his former student Joseph Veverka.

Marsden writes that in the 1960s Whipple became interested "in the idea that compositional similarities suggested that Uranus and Neptune were largely formed from cometary material and that the Öpik‐Oort Cloud (as he always termed it) consisted of “cometesimals” thrown to great distances by planetary gravitational perturbations." He pursued this idea for several decades.

== Personal life ==
At the first press conference after the Stardust spacecraft flew past comet Wild 2 in January 2004, a reporter asked, "What is a whipple?" Like Edwin Hubble, another great astronomer had become synonymous with a piece of space hardware. The first part of the answer was that a whipple is a Whipple bumper, a clever, lightweight structure invented by Fred Lawrence Whipple and designed to protect the spacecraft from the 6-kilometer-per-second impact of comet rocks as large as a centimeter across. The second part was that Fred Whipple was the originator of our modern understanding of comets and a key reason why there was a mission to a comet.

— Donald E. Brownlee, Paul W. Hodge

Whipple was married twice. He married Dorothy Woods in 1928, with whom he had a son; they divorced in 1935. In 1946, he married Babette F. Samelson with whom he had two daughters. Born into a religious family, Whipple became an atheist later in life, but was fascinated with occult phenomena.

Whipple had two cars with plates COMETS and PLANET. Until his 90s, he rode a bicycle to his office. Whipple had an "outstanding collection of astronomical neckties", this collection is "on permanent display at the visitor center at the base of the impressively winding road that leads to Whipple Observatory". He liked scuba diving. The family owned a house on Great Camanoe Island in the British Virgin Islands. He grew roses at their home in Belmont. Whipple was also an artist; one of his interest was what he called a "stochastic painting":

which involved the development of a design of polygons from successive pairs of random numbers. The colors used were also established by means of random numbers, and if the pairs were increased to random triplets, one could also incorporate arcs of circles whose radii were computed by means of the golden ratio. Although the use of rules for constructing these paintings may seem anathema to genuine artistry, he insisted that the choice of rules itself involved creativity and self‐expression.

Whipple died on August 30, 2004, aged 97, in Cambridge, Massachusetts.

== Awards and honors ==
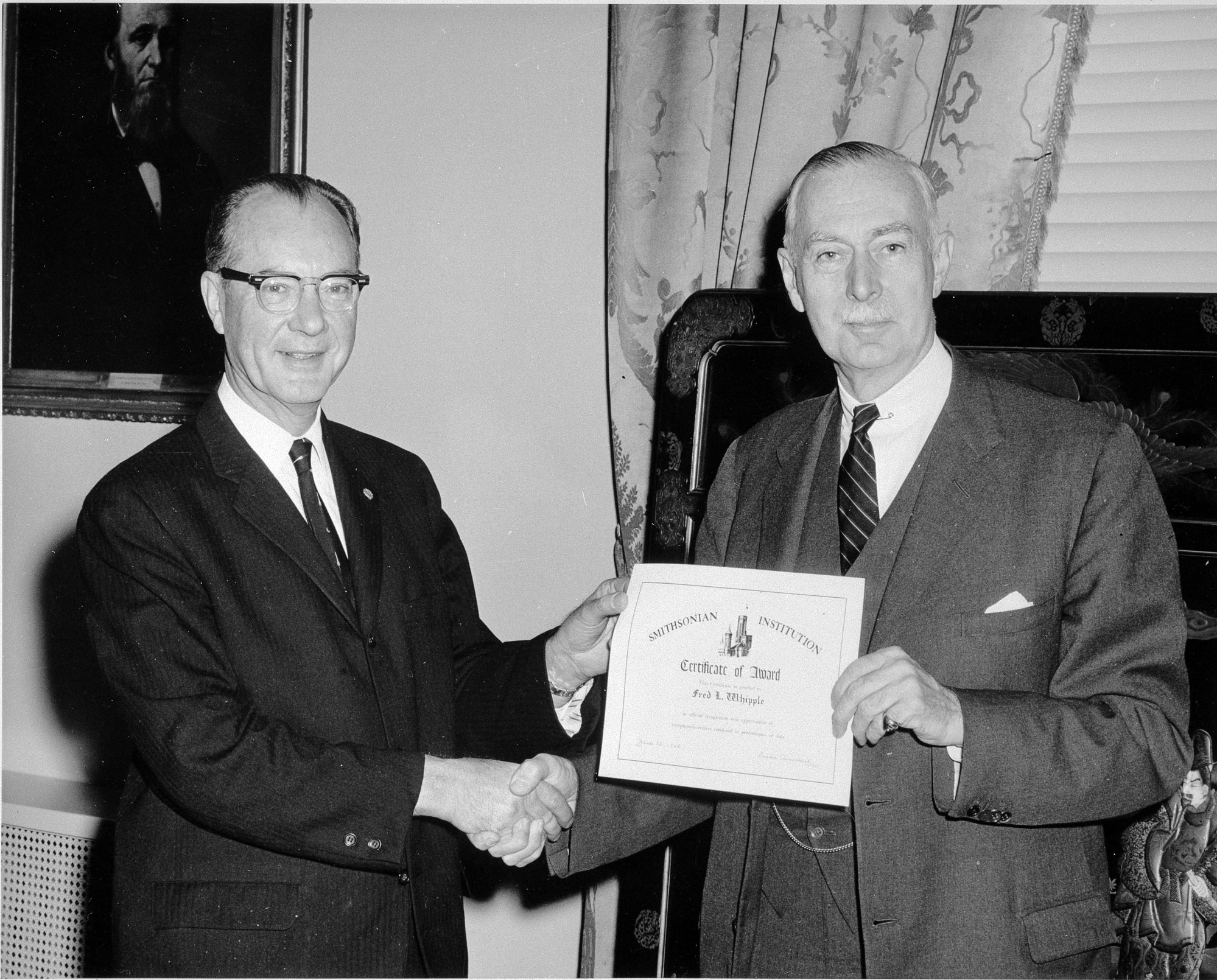
Fred Whipple, left, and Leonard Carmichael, seventh Secretary of the Smithsonian Institution, when Whipple won the President's Award presented by John F. Kennedy, 1962

In 1963, Whipple was awarded with President's Award for Distinguished Federal Civilian Service for his work on the satellite tracking network. Whipple later said that "I think that was my most exciting moment, when I was able to invite my parents and my family to the Rose Garden for the award ceremony".

- 1941: Elected to the American Academy of Arts and Sciences
- 1949: J. Lawrence Smith Medal of the National Academy of Sciences
- 1956: Elected to the American Philosophical Society
- 1959: Elected to the United States National Academy of Sciences
- 1963: President's Award for Distinguished Federal Civilian Service, by US President John F. Kennedy
- 1970: Leonard Medal of the Meteoritical Society
- 1973: Joseph Henry Medal of the Smithsonian Institution
- 1981: Golden Plate Award of the American Academy of Achievement
- 1983: Gold Medal of the Royal Astronomical Society
- 1986: Bruce Medal of the Astronomical Society of the Pacific
- 1987: Henry Norris Russell Lectureship of the American Astronomical Society
- 1990: Whipple Award of the American Geophysical Union, namesake and first recipient
- 2000: included to the list of 78 "Living Legends" by the Library of Congress

=== Namesakes ===
- Main-belt asteroid 1940 Whipple
- Whipple Observatory on Mount Hopkins in Arizona
- Whipple House on Great Camanoe in the British Virgin Islands
- Whipple, proposed NASA spacecraft to observe the Oort cloud
