= 36P/Whipple =

Jupiter-family comet

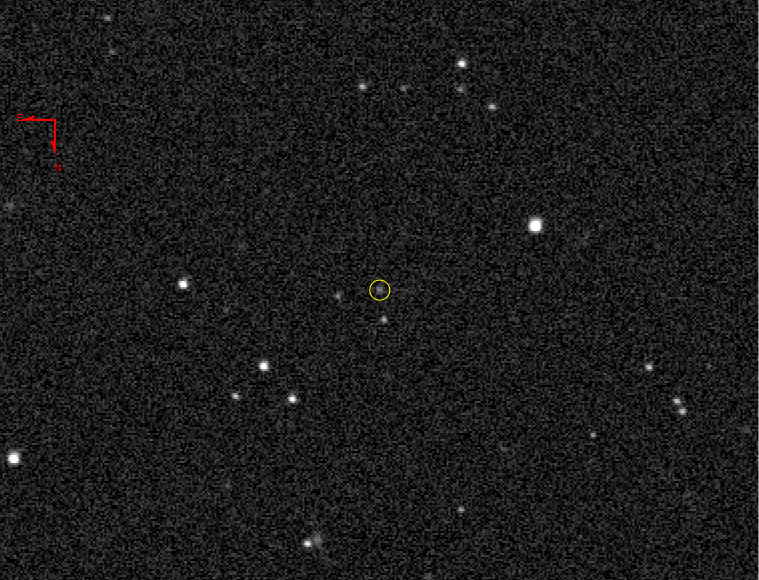
- Comet Whipple imaged from the Zwicky Transient Facility on 21 November 2020

Discovery
- Discovered by: Fred Lawrence Whipple
- Discovery date: 15 October 1933

Designations
- MPC designation: P/1925 QD, P/1933 U1, P/1940 R1
- Alternative designations: 1926 VIII, 1933 IV; 1941 III, 1948 VI; 1955 VIII, 1963 II; 1970 XIV, 1978 VIII; 1986 XII, 1994 XXXII

Orbital characteristics
- Epoch: 9 June 2026 (JD 2461200.5)
- Observation arc: 96.54 years (Note: Observation arc from the Minor Planet Center database covering dates from 21 August 1925 until 6 March 2022.)
- Earliest precovery date: 21 August 1925
- Number of observations: 989
- Aphelion: 5.252 AU
- Perihelion: 3.034 AU
- Semi-major axis: 4.143 AU
- Eccentricity: 0.26768
- Orbital period: 8.43 years
- Inclination: 9.944°
- Longitude of ascending node: 181.81°
- Argument of periapsis: 201.19°
- Mean anomaly: 257.09°
- Last perihelion: 31 May 2020
- Next perihelion: 4 November 2028
- T_{Jupiter}: 2.952
- Earth MOID: 2.095 AU
- Jupiter MOID: 0.259 AU

Physical characteristics
- Mean radius: 2.55 km (1.58 mi)
- Mean density: 660±110 kg/m^{3}
- Synodic rotation period: 40 hours
- Comet total magnitude (M1): 10.7
- Comet nuclear magnitude (M2): 14.5

36P/Whipple is a Jupiter-family comet with an 8.43-year orbit around the Sun. It is also the lowest numbered quasi-Hilda comet. It passed 0.25 AU (37 million km) from Jupiter in June 1922.

== Physical characteristics ==
The comet nucleus is initially estimated to be around 4.56 km (2.83 mi) in diameter. However, more recent analysis in 2011 indicated a larger nucleus at 5.1 km (3.2 mi). Its rotation period is determined to be around 40 hours long.

== Notes ==
Numbered comets
Previous; 35P/Herschel–Rigollet	36P/Whipple	Next; 37P/Forbes
