= Orbiting Astronomical Observatory 2 =

Space telescope launched on December 7, 1968

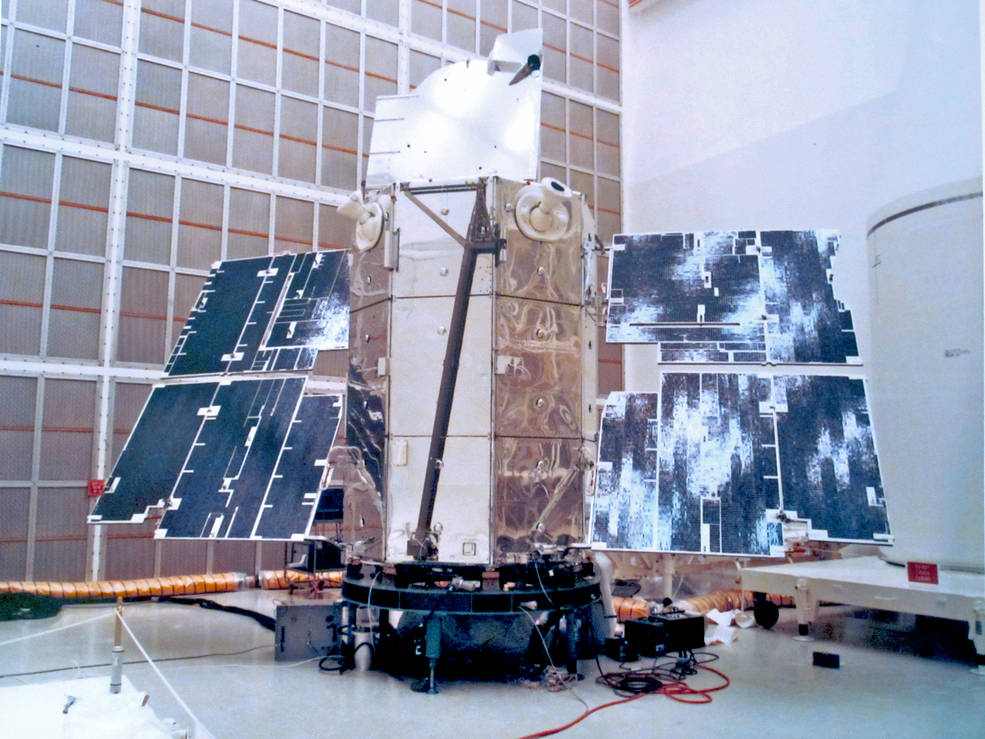
- Technicians in a clean room at NASA’s Kennedy Space Center in Cape Canaveral, Florida, check out the Orbiting Astronomical Observatory 2 before the mission’s Dec. 7, 1968, launch.
- Names: OAO-A2, OAO2
- Mission type: Astronomy
- Operator: NASA
- COSPAR ID: 1968-110A
- SATCAT no.: 3597

Spacecraft properties
- Manufacturer: Grumman
- Dry mass: 2,012 kilograms (4,436 lb)

Start of mission
- Launch date: 7 December 1968, 08:40:09 UTC
- Rocket: Atlas SLV-3C Centaur-D
- Launch site: Cape Canaveral LC-36B

End of mission
- Disposal: Telescope issues
- Deactivated: February 1973

Orbital parameters
- Reference system: Geocentric
- Regime: Low Earth
- Perigee altitude: 768 kilometres (477 mi)
- Apogee altitude: 777 kilometres (483 mi)
- Inclination: 35.0 degrees
- Period: 100.30 minutes
- Epoch: 6 January 1969

The Orbiting Astronomical Observatory 2 (OAO-2, nicknamed Stargazer) was the first successful space telescope (first space telescope being OAO-1, which failed to operate once in orbit), launched on December 7, 1968. An Atlas-Centaur rocket launched it into a nearly circular 750-kilometre (470 mi) altitude Earth orbit. Data was collected in ultraviolet on many sources including comets, planets, and galaxies. It had two major instrument sets facing in opposite directions; the Smithsonian Astrophysical Observatory (SAO) and the Wisconsin Experiment Package (WEP). One discovery was large halos of hydrogen gas around comets, and it also observed Nova Serpentis, which was a nova discovered in 1970.

== Celescope: Smithsonian Astrophysical Observatory ==
The Smithsonian Astrophysical Observatory, also called Celescope, had four 12-inch (30 cm) Schwarzschild telescopes that fed into Uvicons. The Uvicon was an ultra-violet light detector based on the Westinghouse Vidicon. Ultraviolet light was converted into electrons which were in turn converted to a voltage as those electrons hit the detection area of the tube. There has been a Uvicon in the collection of the Smithsonian Institution since 1973.

Various filters, photocathodes, and electronics aided in collecting data in several ultraviolet light passbands. The detectors showed a gradual loss of sensitivity and the experiment was turned off in April 1970. By the time it finished about 10 percent of the sky was observed resulting in a catalog of 5,068 UV stars.

== Wisconsin Experiment Package ==
The Wisconsin Experiment Package had seven different telescopes for ultraviolet observations. For example, there was a nebular photoelectric photometer fed by a 16-inch (41 cm) telescope with a six-position filter wheel that unfortunately failed a few weeks after launch.

Construction was supervised by Arthur Code of the University of Wisconsin-Madison. WEP observed over 1200 targets in ultraviolet light before the mission ended in early 1973.

== Discoveries ==
In addition to the Celescope's catalog of UV stars, the WEP observed comet Tago-Sato-Kosaka and found it to be surrounded by a cloud of hydrogen, confirming that the comet was largely made up of water, and detected the 2175-angstrom bump, an increase in UV absorption at that wavelength that is still not fully explained.

== Spacecraft bus ==
The observatory was built in the shape of an octagonal prism. It measured about 10 by 7 ft (3.0 by 2.1 m) and weighed 4,400 lb (2,000 kg).

== See also ==
- Orbiting Astronomical Observatory
- Orbiting Solar Observatory
