= James W. Warwick =

James Walter Warwick
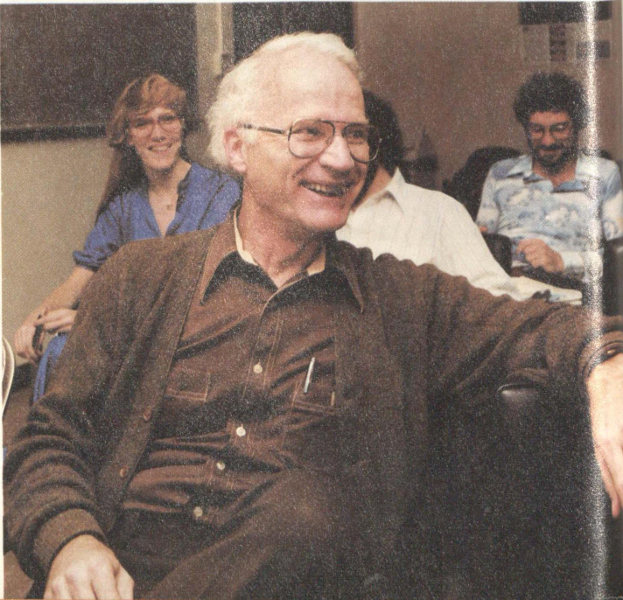
- Warwick in c. 1980
- Born: May 23, 1924; Toledo, Ohio
- Died: June 20, 2013 (aged 89); Fresno, California
- Education: Harvard University (BA, MA, PhD)
- Scientific career
- Fields: radio astronomy
- Workplaces: University of Colorado Boulder
- Thesis: Some Problems of Magnetic Stars (1951)
- Doctoral advisors: Fred Whipple

James Walter Warwick (1924–2013) was an American astronomer, a pioneer of low frequency radio astronomy.

== Biography ==
Warwick was born on May 22, 1924 in Toledo, Ohio. During the war, he served in the U.S. Army Air Corp as a Boeing B-29 Superfortress radar bombardier in the South Pacific. After the war he studied at Harvard University, and got his BA, MA, and PhD (1951) there. After graduation he worked on solar flares at Harvard College Observatory's Sacramento Peak Station in New Mexico, and the High Altitude Observatory in Boulder, Colorado. In 1955, he moved to University of Colorado Boulder, where he founded the Department of Astrogeophysics. He retired in 1989.

Warwick was the principal investigator for Voyager program's Planetary Radio Astronomy instrument. He then left the University of Colorado Boulder, and founded Radiophysics, Inc.

Warwick participated in IAU commissions on Radio Astronomy and on Solar Radiation.

Warwick played clarinet in an army band during the war. At 39, he took cello lessons. He played cello and clarinet for the Boulder Philharmonic Orchestra and played at a local church. He was married three times.

== Selected publications ==
- Warwick, James W. (1 May 1967). "Radiophysics of Jupiter". Space Science Reviews. 6 (6): 841–891. Bibcode:1967SSRv....6..841W. doi:10.1007/BF00222408. ISSN 1572-9672.
- Warwick, J. W.; Pearce, J. B.; Peltzer, R. G.; Riddle, A. C. (1 December 1977). "Planetary radio astronomy experiment for Voyager missions". Space Science Reviews. 21 (3): 309–327. Bibcode:1977SSRv...21..309W. doi:10.1007/BF00211544. ISSN 1572-9672.
- Kaiser, M. L.; Desch, M. D.; Warwick, J. W.; Pearce, J. B. (12 September 1980). "Voyager Detection of Nonthermal Radio Emission from Saturn". Science. 209 (4462): 1238–1240. Bibcode:1980Sci...209.1238K. doi:10.1126/science.209.4462.1238. PMID 17811197.
- Warwick, James W.; Stoker, Carol; Meyer, Thomas R. (10 April 1982). "Radio emission associated with rock fracture: Possible application to the Great Chilean Earthquake of May 22, 1960". Journal of Geophysical Research: Solid Earth. 87 (B4): 2851–2859. Bibcode:1982JGR....87.2851W. doi:10.1029/JB087iB04p02851.
- Hayenga, Craig O.; Warwick, James W. (20 August 1981). "Two-dimensional interferometric positions of VHF lightning sources". Journal of Geophysical Research: Oceans. 86 (C8): 7451–7462. Bibcode:1981JGR....86.7451H. doi:10.1029/JC086iC08p07451.
- Warwick, James W.; et al. (4 July 1986). "Voyager 2 Radio Observations of Uranus". Science. 233 (4759): 102–106. Bibcode:1986Sci...233..102W. doi:10.1126/science.233.4759.102. PMID 17812898.
- Warwick, James W.; et al. (15 December 1989). "Voyager Planetary Radio Astronomy at Neptune". Science. 246 (4936): 1498–1501. Bibcode:1989Sci...246.1498W. doi:10.1126/science.246.4936.1498. PMID 17756007.
