= Minoru Honda =

Japanese astronomer

- 本田 実
- Born: February 26, 1913
- Died: August 26, 1990 (aged 77)
- Known for: Discovered twelve comets between 1940 and 1968
- Scientific career
- Fields: Astronomy
- Institutions: Zodiacal Light Observatory

Minoru Honda (本田 実, Honda Minoru; February 26, 1913 – August 26, 1990) was a Japanese astronomer. Starting in 1937, Honda worked for Issei Yamamoto at the Zodiacal Light Observatory in Hiroshima.

He discovered twelve comets between 1940 and 1968, including the periodic comet 45P/Honda–Mrkos–Pajdušáková.

He discovered on FH Serpentis (Nova Serpentis 1970) on February 13, 1970 from Kurashiki, Japan.

He was the first to report the very bright V1500 Cygni (Nova Cygni 1975) at magnitude 3.0 on August 29, 1975; it peaked at 2.0, and many hundreds of independent discoveries were subsequently made by others.

The asteroid 3904 Honda is named after him, 8485 Satoru is named after his wife, and 11442 Seijin-Sanso is named after his astronomical observatory.
