= Naming of comets =

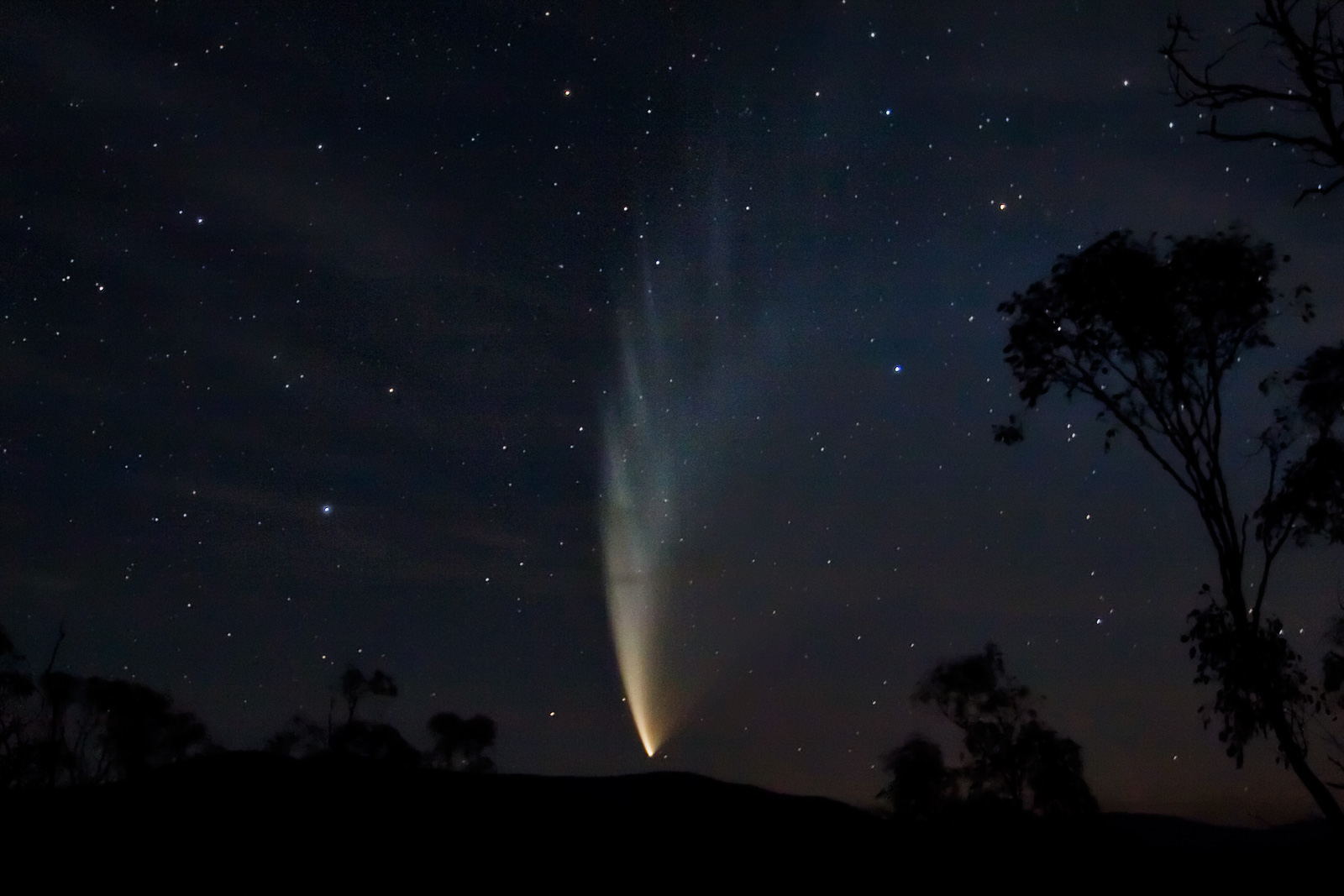
Comet McNaught, named after its discoverer Robert H. McNaught. It is also known as the Great Comet of 2007 and has the numerical designation C/2006 P1.

Comets have been observed for over 2,000 years. During that time, several different systems have been used to assign names to each comet. As a result, many comets have more than one name.

The simplest system names comets after the year in which they were observed (e.g. the Great Comet of 1680). Later a convention arose of naming comets after the people who discovered them (e.g. Comet Hale–Bopp) or performed the first detailed study of that comet (e.g. Halley's Comet).

During the twentieth century, improvements in technology and dedicated searches led to a massive increase in the number of comet discoveries, which was accommodated by introducing a numeric designation scheme. The original scheme assigned a code that depended on the order comets were observed to pass through perihelion (e.g. Comet 1970 II). Continued increases in the numbers of comet discoveries made this scheme impractical, so a new system was adopted in 1994 and remains in operation. The current system assigns a code based on the type of orbit and the date of discovery (e.g. C/2012 S1).

== Named by year ==
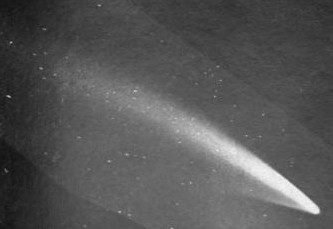
The Great January Comet of 1910, named after the date it appeared

Before any systematic naming convention was adopted, comets were named in a variety of ways. Prior to the early 20th century, most comets were simply referred to by the year when they appeared e.g. the "Comet of 1702".

Particularly bright comets which came to public attention (i.e. beyond the astronomy community) would be described as the great comet of that year, such as the "Great Comet of 1680" and "Great Comet of 1882". If more than one great comet appeared in a single year, the month would be used for disambiguation e.g. the "Great January comet of 1910". Occasionally other additional adjectives might be used.

== Named after people ==
Possibly the earliest comet to be named after a person was Caesar's Comet in 44 BC, which was so named because it was observed shortly after the assassination of Julius Caesar and was interpreted as a sign of his deification. Later eponymous comets were named after the astronomer(s) who conducted detailed investigations on them, or later those who discovered the comet.

=== Investigators ===
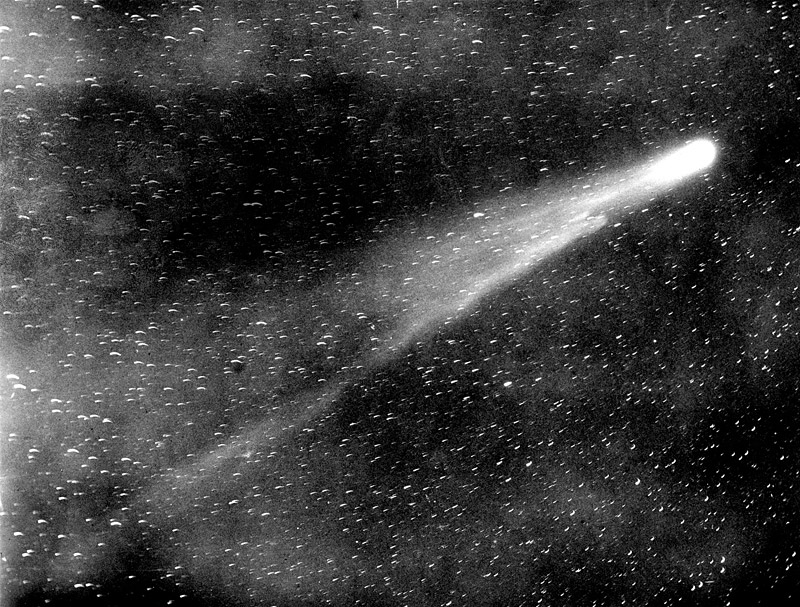
Halley's Comet, named after Edmond Halley who first calculated its orbit. It now has the numerical designations 1P/Halley and 1P/1682 Q1.

After Edmond Halley demonstrated that the comets of 1531, 1607, and 1682 were the same body and successfully predicted its return in 1759, that comet became known as Halley's Comet. Similarly, the second and third known periodic comets, Encke's Comet and Biela's Comet, were named after the astronomers who calculated their orbits rather than their original discoverers. Later, periodic comets were usually named after their discoverers, but comets that had appeared only once continued to be referred to by the year of their apparition.

=== Discoverers ===
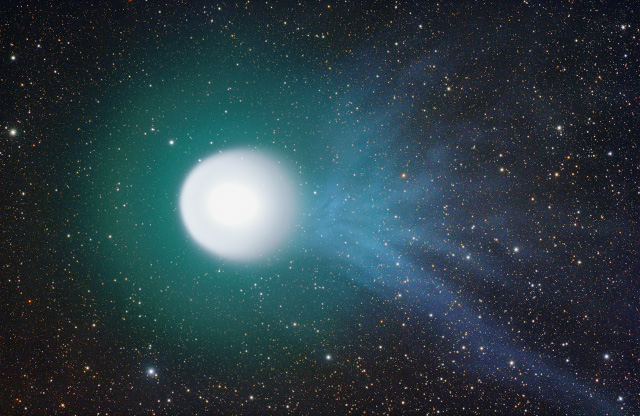
Comet Holmes, named after its discoverer Edwin Holmes. It also has the numerical designation 17P/Holmes.

The first comet to be named after the person who discovered it, rather than the one who calculated its orbit, was Comet Faye – discovered by Hervé Faye in 1843. However, this convention did not become widespread until the early 20th century. It remains common today.

A comet can be named after up to three discoverers, either working together as a team or making independent discoveries (without knowledge of the other investigator's work). The names are hyphenated together, using en dashes where possible. For example, Comet Swift–Tuttle was found first by Lewis Swift and then by Horace Parnell Tuttle a few days later; the discoveries were made independently and so both are honoured in the name. When the discoverer has a hyphenated surname (e.g. Stephen Singer-Brewster), the hyphen is replaced by a space (105P/Singer Brewster) to avoid confusion.

From the late 20th century onwards, many comets have been discovered by large teams of astronomers, so may be named for the collaboration or instrument they used. For example, 160P/LINEAR was discovered by the Lincoln Near-Earth Asteroid Research (LINEAR) team. Comet IRAS–Araki–Alcock was discovered independently by a team using the Infrared Astronomy Satellite (IRAS) and the amateur astronomers Genichi Araki and George Alcock.

In the past, when multiple comets were discovered by the same individual, group of individuals, or team, the comets' names were distinguished by adding a numeral to the discoverers' names (but only for periodic comets); thus Comets Shoemaker–Levy 1 to 9 (discovered by Carolyn Shoemaker, Eugene Shoemaker & David Levy). Today, the large numbers of comets discovered by some instruments makes this system impractical, and no attempt is made to ensure that each comet is given a unique name. Instead, the comets' systematic designations are used to avoid confusion.

== Systematic designations ==
=== Original system ===
Until 1994, comets were first given a provisional designation consisting of the year of their discovery followed by a lowercase letter indicating its order of discovery in that year (for example, Comet 1969i (Bennett) was the 9th comet discovered in 1969). Once the comet had been observed through perihelion and its orbit had been established, the comet was given a permanent designation of the year of its perihelion, followed by a Roman numeral indicating its order of perihelion passage in that year, so that Comet 1969i became Comet 1970 II (it was the second comet to pass perihelion in 1970).

=== Current system ===
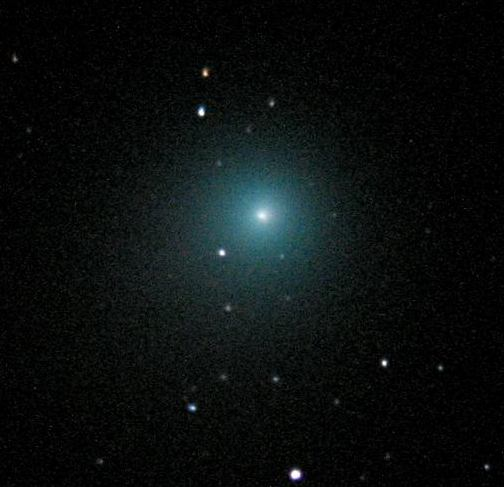
C/2004 Q2, the second comet discovered in the second half of August 2004. It is also known as Comet Machholz after its discoverer Donald Machholz.

Increasing numbers of comet discoveries made this procedure awkward, as did the delay between discovery and perihelion passage before the permanent name could be assigned. As a result, in 1994 the International Astronomical Union approved a new naming system. Comets are now provisionally designated by the year of their discovery followed by a letter indicating the half-month of the discovery and a number indicating the order of discovery (a system similar to that already used for asteroids). For example, the fourth comet discovered in the second half of February 2006 was designated 2006 D4. Prefixes are then added to indicate the nature of the comet:

- P/ indicates a periodic comet, defined for these purposes as any comet with an orbital period of less than 200 years or confirmed observations at more than one perihelion passage.
- C/ indicates a non-periodic comet i.e. any comet that is not periodic according to the preceding definition.
- X/ indicates a comet for which no reliable orbit could be calculated (generally, historical comets).
- D/ indicates a periodic comet that has disappeared, broken up, or been lost. Examples include Lexell's Comet (D/1770 L1) and Comet Shoemaker–Levy 9 (D/1993 F2)
- A/ indicates an object that was mistakenly identified as a comet, but is actually a minor planet. An unused option for many years, this classification was first applied in 2017 for ʻOumuamua (A/2017 U1) and subsequently to all asteroids on comet-like orbits.
- I/ indicates an interstellar object, added to the system in 2017 to allow the reclassification of ʻOumuamua (1I/2017 U1). As of 2025, the only other objects with this classification are 2I/Borisov (2I/2019 Q4) and 3I/ATLAS (C/2025 N1).

For example, Comet Hale–Bopp's designation is C/1995 O1. After their second observed perihelion passage, designations of periodic comets are given an additional prefix number, indicating the order of their discovery. Halley's Comet, the first comet identified as periodic, has the systematic designation 1P/1682 Q1.

Separately to the systematic numbered designation, comets are routinely assigned a standard name by the IAU, which is almost always the name or names of their discoverers. When a comet has only received a provisional designation, the "name" of the comet is typically only included parenthetically after this designation, if at all. However, when a periodic comet receives a number and a permanent designation, the comet is usually notated by using its given name after its number and prefix. For instance, the unnumbered periodic comet P/2011 NO1 (Elenin) and the non-periodic comet C/2007 E2 (Lovejoy) are notated with their provisional systematic designation followed by their name in parentheses; however, the numbered periodic comet 67P/Churyumov–Gerasimenko is given a permanent designation of its numbered prefix ("67P/") followed by its name ("Churyumov–Gerasimenko").

Interstellar objects are also numbered in order of discovery and can receive names, as well as a systematic designation. The first example was 1I/ʻOumuamua, which has the formal designation 1I/2017 U1 (ʻOumuamua).

==== Relationship with asteroid designations ====
Sometimes it is unclear whether a newly discovered object is a comet or an asteroid (which would receive a minor planet designation). Any object that was initially misclassified as an asteroid but quickly corrected to a comet incorporates the minor planet designation into the cometary one. This can lead to some odd names such as for 227P/Catalina–LINEAR, whose alternative name is 227P/2004 EW_{38} (Catalina-LINEAR), derived from the original provisional minor planet designation 2004 EW_{38}.

In other cases, a known asteroid can begin to exhibit cometary characteristics (such as developing a coma) and thus be classified as both an asteroid and a comet. These receive designations under both systems. There are only eight such bodies that are cross-listed as both comets and asteroids: 2060 Chiron (95P/Chiron), 4015 Wilson–Harrington (107P/Wilson–Harrington), 7968 Elst–Pizarro (133P/Elst–Pizarro), 60558 Echeclus (174P/Echeclus), 118401 LINEAR (176P/LINEAR), (300163) 2006 VW_{139} (288P/2006 VW_{139}), (323137) 2003 BM_{80} (282P/2003 BM_{80}), and (457175) 2008 GO_{98} (362P/2008 GO_{98}).
