= C/2004 Q2 (Machholz) =

Non-periodic comet

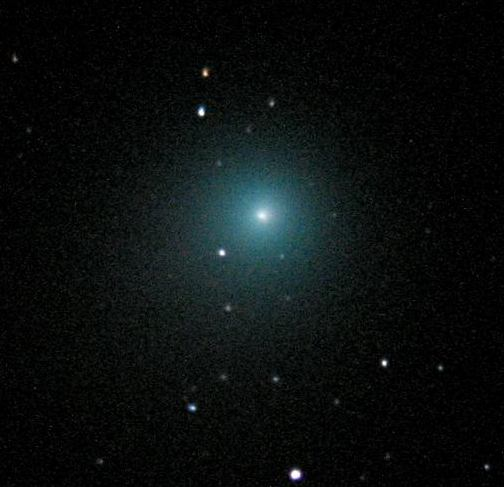
- Comet Machholz photographed by Ralf Weber from Andalusia, Spain in February 2005

Discovery
- Discovered by: Donald E. Machholz
- Discovery date: 27 August 2004

Orbital characteristics
- Epoch: 30 March 2005 (JD 2453459.52005)
- Observation arc: 2.03 years
- Number of observations: 3,612
- Aphelion: ~5,100 AU (inbound); ~1,100 AU (outbound)
- Perihelion: 1.205 AU
- Semi-major axis: ~2,400 AU
- Eccentricity: 0.99950
- Orbital period: ~130,000 years (inbound); ~12,400 years (outbound)
- Inclination: 38.589°
- Longitude of ascending node: 93.622°
- Argument of periapsis: 19.505°
- Mean anomaly: 0.001°
- Last perihelion: 24 January 2005
- T_{Jupiter}: 1.066
- Earth MOID: 0.249 AU
- Jupiter MOID: 1.973 AU

Physical characteristics
- Dimensions: 4.2–7.8 km (2.6–4.8 mi)
- Mean diameter: 6.0 km (3.7 mi)
- Mass: 1.0×10^{13} kg
- Mean density: 450±70 kg/m^{3}
- Synodic rotation period: 9.1±0.2 hours
- Comet total magnitude (M1): 11.2

Comet Machholz, formally designated as C/2004 Q2, is a non-periodic comet discovered by Donald Machholz on 27 August 2004. It reached naked eye brightness in January 2005. Unusual for such a relatively bright comet, its perihelion was farther from the Sun than the Earth's orbit.

== Physical characteristics ==
During its closest approach to Earth in January 2005, ground observations from La Palma, Spain revealed that the comet may have a rotation period of 9.1±0.2 hours, although a 2012 study regarding the morphological structures in its coma suggested it may have a rotation period of 0.74 days instead.

Between December 2004 and January 2005, observations from Lulin and La Silla observatories spotted two jets of carbon and cyanogen (CN) compounds that form a spiral-like structure within the coma, which were caused by two active surface regions in its nucleus. In March 2005, the GALEX spacecraft observed the comet in far-ultraviolet (FUV) light, where it determined that ionized methane (CH_{4}) molecules dominated its coma, which explained the shorter than expected lifetime of carbon molecules detected. Spectral analysis of this comet's chemical composition suggest that it may have formed in a relatively inner region of the solar nebula than other typical Oort cloud comets, at a distance of at least 5.0 AU (750 million km) from the Sun. Additionally, the methane molecules frozen in the comet and its ratio relative to water indicate formation at relatively high temperatures compared to other comets.

Near-infrared measurements of the comet has indicated that its surface material generate an outflow in the form of fragments that separated into gas and dust under sublimation on time scales of the order of days.

Its nucleus has a mean diameter of 6.0 km (3.7 mi).

== Orbit ==
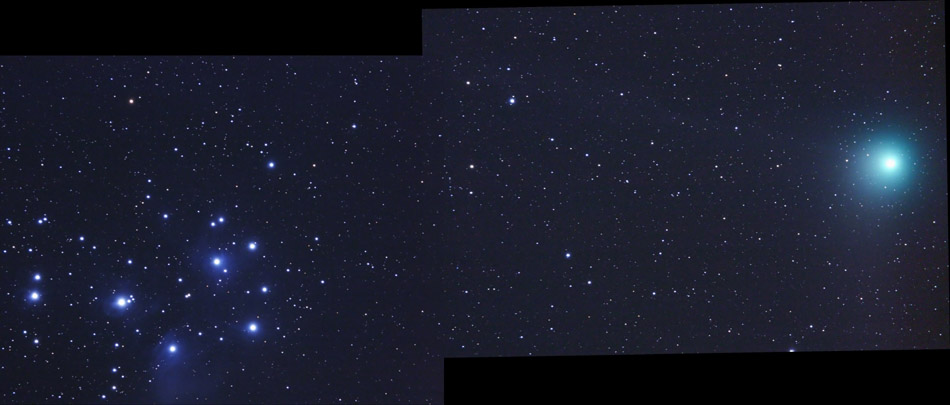
C/2004 Q2 appears to pass near the Pleiades cluster in 2005.

Given the orbital eccentricity of this object, different epochs can generate quite different heliocentric unperturbed two-body best-fit solutions to the aphelion distance (maximum distance) of this object. For objects at such high eccentricity, the Suns barycentric coordinates are more stable than heliocentric coordinates. Using JPL Horizons the barycentric orbital elements for epoch 2050 generate a semi-major axis of 537 AU (80.3 billion km) and a period of approximately 12,400 years.

== See also ==
- 96P/Machholz
- 141P/Machholz
- C/1978 R3 (Machholz)
- C/2018 V1 (Machholz–Fujikawa–Iwamoto)
