= 96P sungrazer family =

Sungrazing comets group

The 96P sungrazer family is a small group of sungrazing comets, originating from the comet 96P/Machholz. It is only observed by CCOR coronographs and LASCO. It is made out of three subgroups: Marsden, Kracht and Kracht II.

96P type is the rarest among all objects recorded by SOHO: just 3% of all belong to this group.

The 5000th comet observed by this probe belongs to the Marsden group, and was discovered on 25 March 2024.

% of 96P group
Subgroup	Marsden	Kracht	Kracht II	Total
Frequency	1.5%	1.1%	0.3%	2.9%

== Source and discovery ==
It is suggested that this group is composed of fragments which have detached from the Macholz comet about 800 to 1,200 years ago. The orbit is very similar to the parent body with slightly different gravitational contacts with Jupiter and lower perihelion distance as well as inclination.

The Marsden subgroup was discovered by British astronomer Brian G. Marsden and the same as Meyer group, it was announced on 18 February 2002. Kracht I and II were discovered by Rainer Kracht in 2002 after analysing orbits and finding similarities between a pair of comets.

== Characteristics and frequency ==
These objects show up at intervals averaging around 6 years: their approximate orbital period. They are often observed in clusters of two or more objects, showing up within a few days after each other. Peak brightness typically occurs a few hours after perihelion, and the apparent magnitude typically ranges from 7 to 8 magnitudes, although the brightest ones can reach apparent magnitude 5.

During passage near the Sun, fragmentation takes place, creating smaller objects. The 96P complex will likely become extinct in the near future.

The size range is not well known; they are probably larger than Kreutz group comets, which are usually several meters to a few decameters wide.
