= 2I/Borisov =

Interstellar comet in 2019

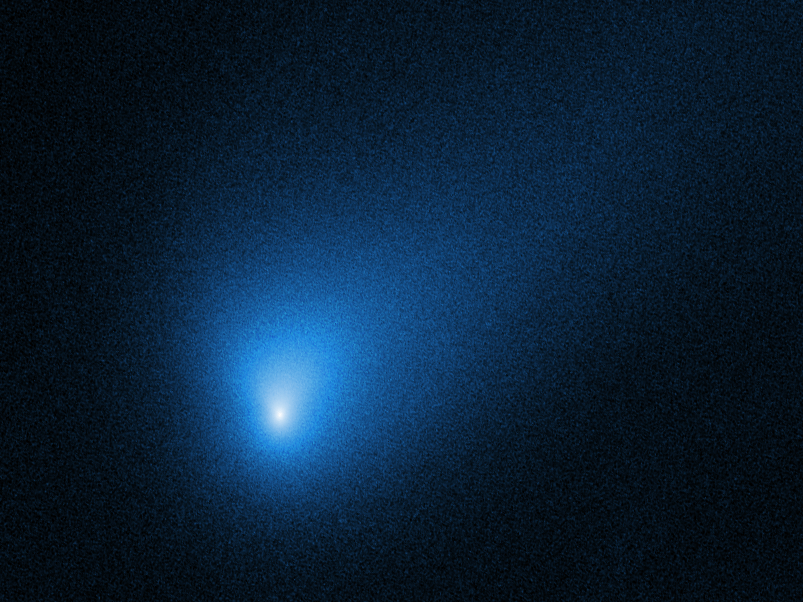
- Comet Borisov in October 2019 (Note: A photograph of Borisov's dust trail taken on 12 October 2019 with the UVIS F350LP channel of Wide Field Camera 3 aboard the Hubble Space Telescope. At the time of this photograph, Borisov was 418 million km (2.79 AU) from Earth, similar to the average distance of the asteroid Ceres from the Sun, and traveling at a velocity of 177,000 kilometres per hour (110,000 mph).)

Discovery
- Discovered by: Gennadiy Borisov
- Discovery site: MARGO Observatory, Crimea
- Discovery date: 29 August 2019

Designations
- MPC designation: C/2019 Q4
- Alternative designations: gb00234

Orbital characteristics
- Epoch: 5 January 2020 (JD 2458853.5)
- Observation arc: 964 days
- Earliest precovery date: 13 December 2018
- Number of observations: 3,360
- Perihelion: 2.00652±0.00001 AU
- Semi-major axis: –0.8515 AU (Note: Objects with eccentricities greater than 1 will have a negative semimajor axis, giving them a positive orbital energy—the smaller the perihelion distance, and the larger above 1 the eccentricity is, the closer to 0 the semimajor axis value will be.)
- Eccentricity: 3.3565
- Max. orbital speed: 43.9 km/s @ perihelion
- Min. orbital speed: 32.3 km/s (velocity at infinity)
- Inclination: 44.053°
- Longitude of ascending node: 308.15°
- Argument of periapsis: 209.12°
- Last perihelion: 8 December 2019 13:33 UT
- Earth MOID: 1.093 AU
- Jupiter MOID: 2.388 AU

Physical characteristics
- Dimensions: ≤ 0.4–0.5 km (0.25–0.31 mi)
- Geometric albedo: 0.04 (assumed)
- Comet total magnitude (M1): 13.8

2I/Borisov, originally designated C/2019 Q4 (Borisov), is the first observed rogue comet and the second observed interstellar interloper, after ʻOumuamua. It was discovered by the amateur astronomer and telescope maker Gennadiy Borisov on 29 August 2019 UTC (30 August local time) in MARGO Observatory.

2I/Borisov has a heliocentric orbital eccentricity of 3.36 and is not bound to the Sun. The comet passed through the ecliptic of the Solar System at the end of October 2019, and made its closest approach to the Sun at just over 2 AU on 8 December 2019. The comet passed closest to Earth on 28 December 2019. In November 2019, astronomers from Yale University said that the comet's tail was 14 times the size of Earth, and stated, "It's humbling to realize how small Earth is next to this visitor from another solar system."

== Nomenclature ==
The comet is formally called "2I/Borisov" by the International Astronomical Union (IAU), with "2I" or "2I/2019 Q4" being its designation and "Borisov" being its name, but is sometimes referred to as "Comet Borisov", especially in the popular press. (Note: This is the eighth comet discovered by Gennadiy Borisov, and thus the ambiguous term "Comet Borisov" is not formally used here.) As the second observed interstellar interloper after 1I/ʻOumuamua, it was given the "2I" designation, where "I" stands for interstellar. The name Borisov follows the tradition of naming comets after their discoverers. Before final designation as 2I/Borisov, the object was referred to by other names:

- Early orbit solutions suggested that the comet could be a near-Earth object and was thus listed on IAU's Minor Planet Center's (MPC) Near-Earth Object Confirmation Page (NEOCP) as gb00234.
- Further refinements after thirteen days of observation made clear the object was a hyperbolic comet, and it was given the designation C/2019 Q4 (Borisov) by the Minor Planet Center on 11 September 2019. A number of other astronomers including Davide Farnocchia, Bill Gray, and David Tholen concluded that the comet was interstellar.
- On 24 September 2019 the IAU announced that the Working Group for Small Bodies Nomenclature kept the name Borisov giving the comet the interstellar designation of 2I/Borisov, formally announcing the comet was indeed interstellar.

== Characteristics ==
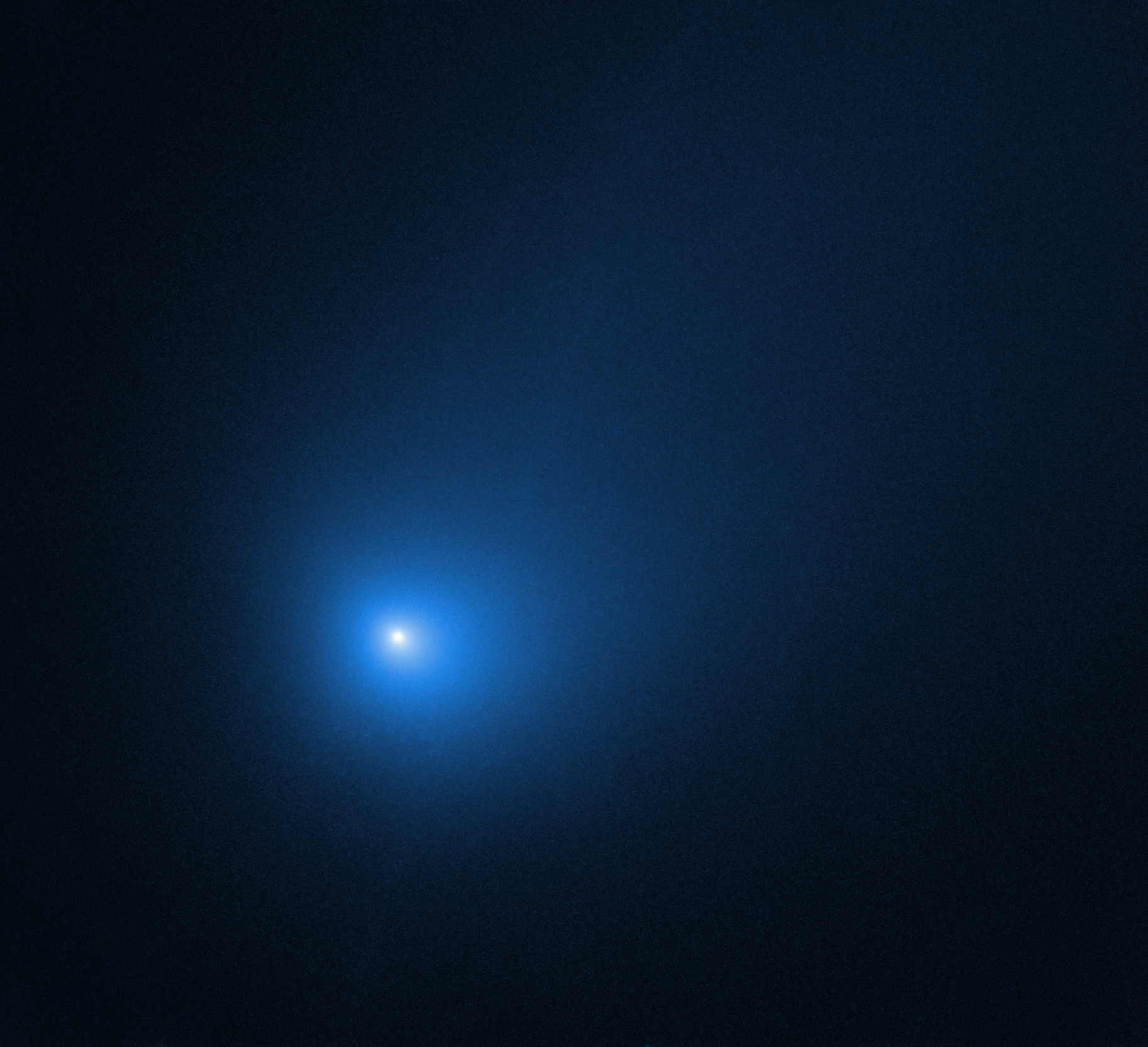
In this observation, the NASA/ESA Hubble Space Telescope revisited the comet shortly after its closest approach to the Sun in December 2019.

External videos
- Interstellar comet 2I/Borisov at perihelion (8 December 2019)

Unlike ʻOumuamua, which had an asteroidal appearance, 2I/Borisov's nucleus was surrounded by a coma, a cloud of dust and gas.

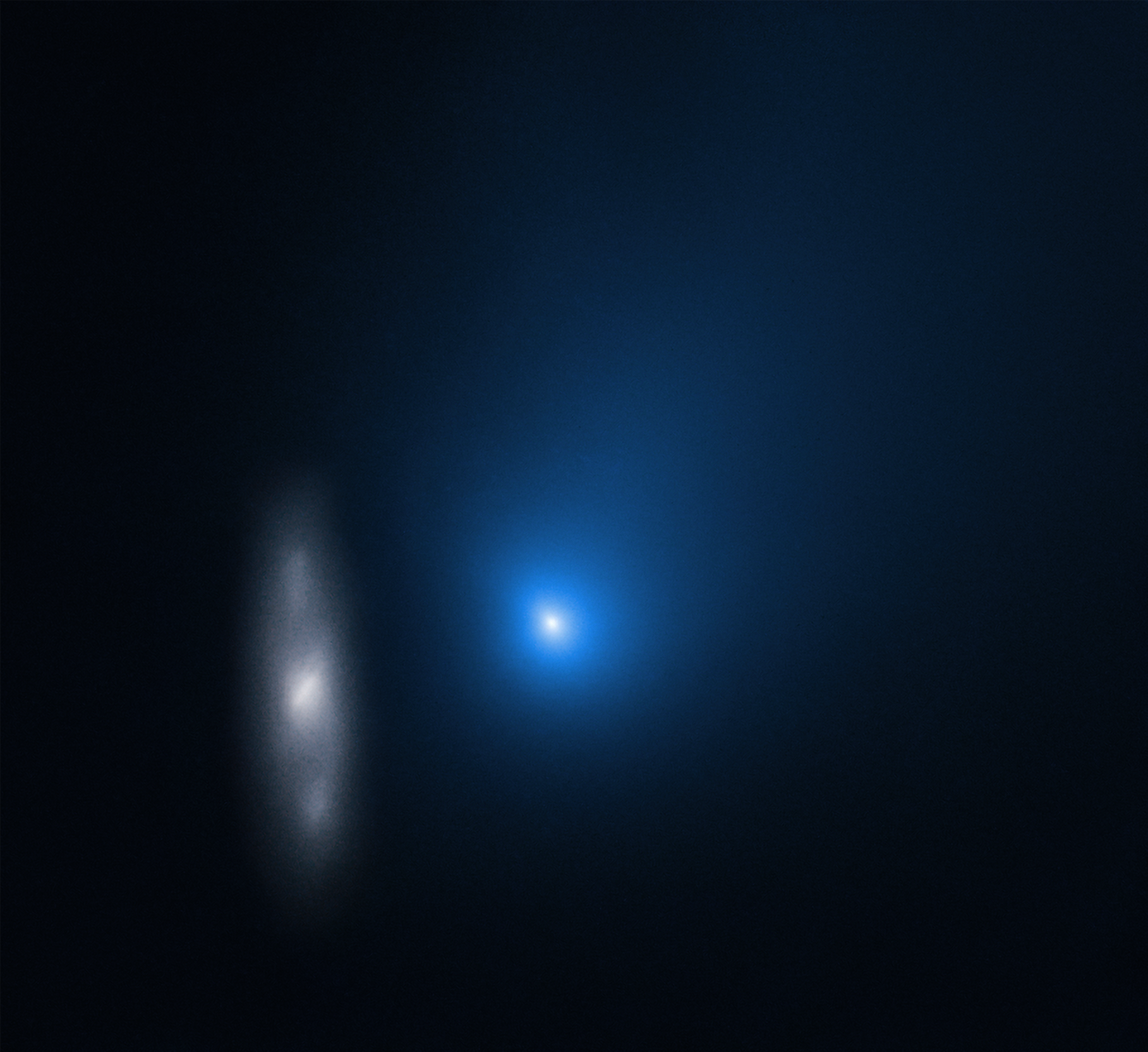
Comet 2I/Borisov and a distant galaxy (2MASX J10500165-0152029) in November 2019

=== Size and shape ===
Early estimates of nucleus 2I/Borisov diameter have ranged from 1.4 to 16 km. 2I/Borisov has, unlike Solar System comets, noticeably shrunk during Solar System flyby, losing at least 0.4% of its mass before perihelion. Also, the amplitude of non-gravitational acceleration places an upper limit of 0.4 km on nucleus size, consistent with a previous Hubble Space Telescope upper limit of 0.5 km. The comet did not come much closer to Earth than 300 million kilometres (2.0 AU), which prevents using radar to directly determine its size and shape. This could be done using the occultation of a star by 2I/Borisov but an occultation would be difficult to predict, requiring a precise determination of its orbit, and the detection would necessitate a network of small telescopes.

=== Rotation ===
A study using observations from Hubble could not find a variation in the light curve. According to this study the rotational period must be larger than 10 hours. A study with CSA's NEOSSat found a period of 13.2 ± 0.2 days, which is unlikely to be the nuclear spin. Monte Carlo simulations based on the available orbit determinations suggest that the equatorial obliquity of 2I/Borisov could be about 59 degrees or 90 degrees; the latter is favored for the latest orbit determination.

=== Chemical makeup and nucleus structure ===
David Jewitt and Jane Luu estimate from the size of its coma the comet is producing 2 kg/s of dust and is losing 60 kg/s of water. They extrapolate that it became active in June 2019 when it was between 4 and 5 AU from the Sun. A search of image archives found precovery observations of 2I/Borisov as early as 13 December 2018, but not on 21 November 2018, indicating it became active between these dates.

2I/Borisov's composition appears uncommon yet not unseen in Solar System comets, being relatively depleted in water and diatomic carbon (C_{2}), but enriched in carbon monoxide and amines (R-NH_{2}). The molar ratio of carbon monoxide to water in 2I/Borisov tail is 35–105%, resembling the unusual blue-tailed comet C/2016 R2 (PanSTARRS) in contrast to the average ratio of 4% for Solar System comets.

2I/Borisov has also produced a minor amount of neutral nickel emission attributed to an unknown volatile compound of nickel. The nickel to iron abundance ratio is similar to Solar System comets.

=== Trajectory ===
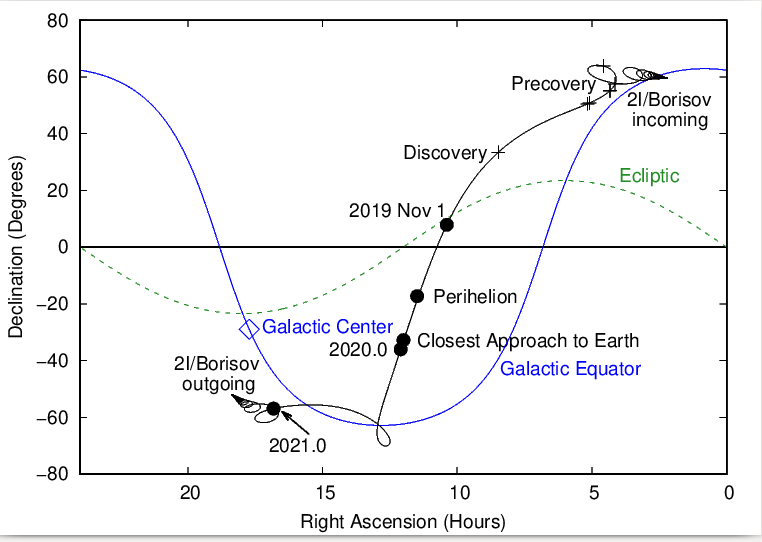
Trajectory across sky in cylindrical coordinates, with 30 August 2019 discovery position along with precovery positions marked back to 13 December 2018 which help narrow down the incoming trajectory

Interstellar velocity inbound ($v_\infty$) (Note: For objects gravitationally bound to the Sun, velocities when approaching the equivalent of an infinite distance from the Sun should be less than a few kilometres per second. At its furthest distance from the Sun, Halley's Comet moves ≈ 1 km/s with respect to the Sun.)
Object	Velocity
1I/2017 U1 (ʻOumuamua)	26.33 km/s 5.55 AU/yr
2I/2019 Q4 (Borisov)	32.3 km/s 6.81 AU/yr
3I/2025 N1 (ATLAS)	58.0 km/s 12.24 AU/yr

As seen from Earth, the comet was in the northern sky from September until mid-November. It crossed the ecliptic plane on 26 October near the star Regulus, and the celestial equator on 13 November 2019, entering the southern sky. On 8 December 2019, the comet reached perihelion (closest approach to the Sun) and was near the inner edge of the asteroid belt. In late December, it made its closest approach to Earth, 1.9 AU, and had a solar elongation of about 80°. Due to its 44° orbital inclination, 2I/Borisov did not make any notable close approaches to the planets. 2I/Borisov entered the Solar System from the direction of Cassiopeia near the border with Perseus. This direction indicates that it originates from the galactic plane, rather than from the galactic halo. It will leave the Solar System in the direction of Telescopium. In interstellar space, 2I/Borisov takes roughly 9,000 years to travel a light-year relative to the Sun. (Note: 299,792.458 km/s / 32.2 km/s = 9,310 times slower than light.)

2I/Borisov's trajectory is extremely hyperbolic, having an orbital eccentricity of 3.36. This is much higher than the 300-plus known weakly hyperbolic comets, with heliocentric eccentricities just over 1, and even ʻOumuamua with an eccentricity of 1.2. (Note: A comet with a parabolic trajectory (with an eccentricity of 1) would leave the Solar System in the direction it entered, having had its path altered by 180°. 2I/Borisov, with its higher eccentricity, has a more open trajectory and will have its path altered by only 34° as it passes through the Solar System.) 2I/Borisov also has a hyperbolic excess velocity ($v_\infty$) of 32 km/s, much higher than what could be explained by perturbations, which could produce velocities when approaching an infinite distance from the Sun of less than a few km/s. These two parameters are important indicators of 2I/Borisov's interstellar origin. For comparison, the Voyager 1 spacecraft, which is leaving the Solar System, is traveling at 16.9 km/s (3.57 AU/a). 2I/Borisov has a much larger eccentricity than ʻOumuamua due to its higher excess velocity and its significantly higher perihelion distance. At this larger distance, the Sun's gravity is less able to alter its path as it passes through the Solar System.

2I/Borisov — orbit diagrams

Trajectory of Borisov (yellow) crossing the ecliptic plane; 'Oumuamua (red) shown for comparison

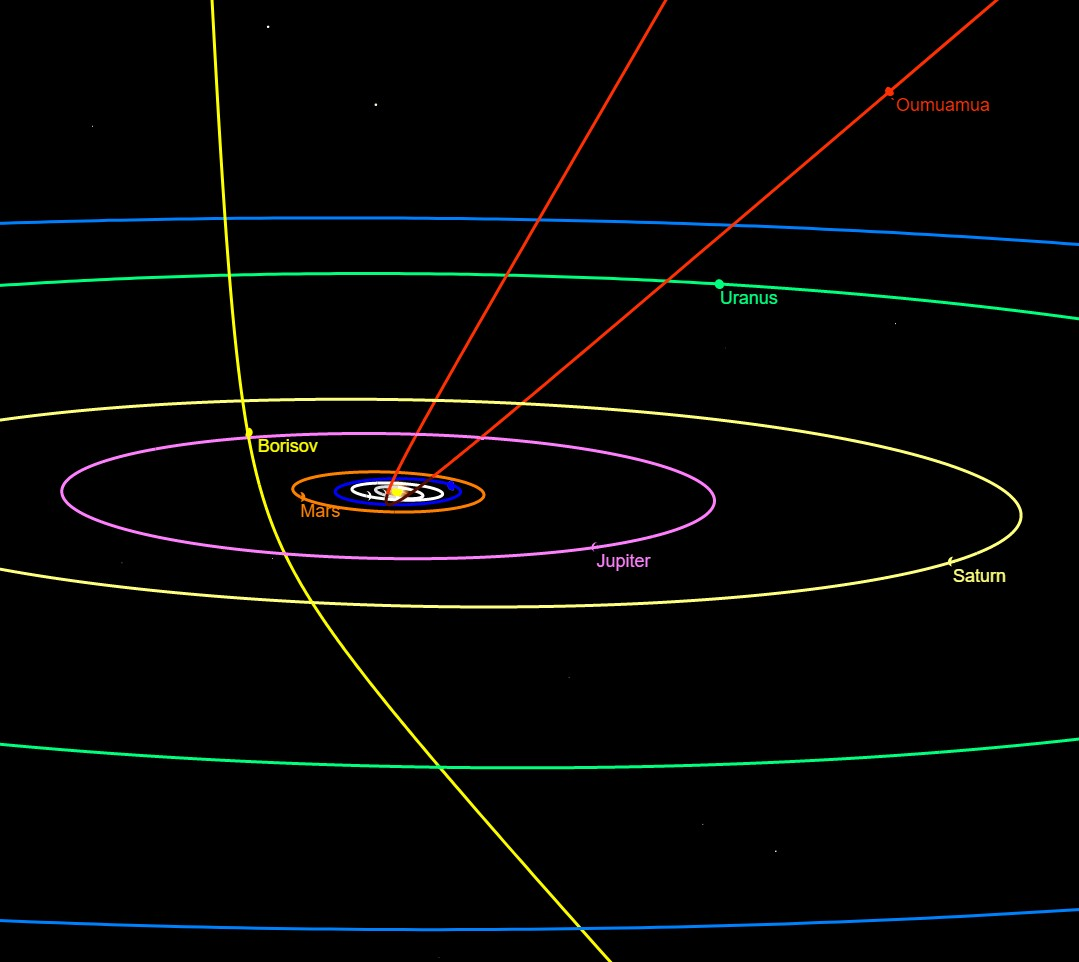
Borisov approaches the ecliptic plane between the orbits of Jupiter (pink) and Mars (orange).

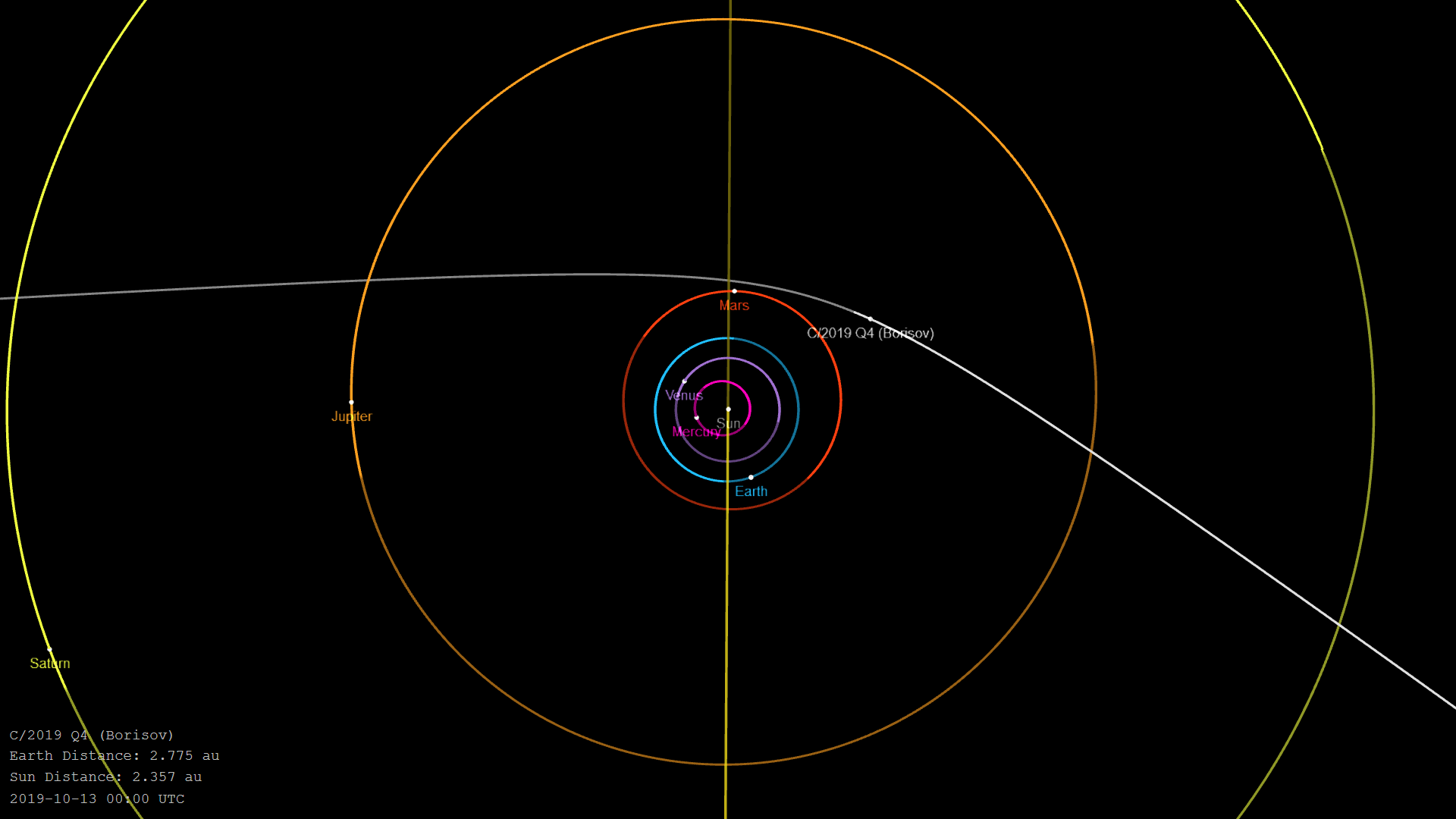
Borisov's trajectory and position (white) as of 13 October 2019 (top view)

== Observation ==
=== Discovery ===
The comet was discovered on 30 August 2019 by amateur astronomer Gennadiy Borisov at his personal observatory MARGO in Nauchnij, Crimea, using a 0.65 meter telescope he designed and built himself. The discovery has been compared to the discovery of Pluto by Clyde Tombaugh. Tombaugh was also an amateur astronomer at the time of his discovery, and had built his own telescopes, although he discovered Pluto using Lowell Observatory's 13" astrograph. At discovery, 2I/Borisov was inbound 3 AU from the Sun, 3.7 AU from Earth, and had a solar elongation of 38°. Borisov described his discovery thus:

JPL Scout eccentricity ranges
# of observations	Observation arc (hours)	Eccentricity range
81	225	0.9–1.6
99	272	2.0–4.2
127	289	2.8–4.7
142	298	2.8–4.5
151	302	2.9–4.5

I observed it on August 29, but it was August 30 Greenwich Time. (Note: This is obviously a mistake: Crimea is 3 hours ahead of Greenwich, so it was 30 August in Crimea when Borisov first observed the comet.) I saw a moving object in the frame, it moved in a direction that was slightly different from that of main asteroids. (Note: Of the 850,000 objects known to orbit the Sun at the time of the discovery, 756,000 (89%) were main-belt asteroids.) I measured its coordinates and consulted the Minor Planet Center database. Turned out, it was a new object. Then I measured the near-Earth object rating, (Note: The NEO rating calculates the probability that a new object is a near-Earth candidate.) it is calculated from various parameters, and it turned out to be 100%—in other words, dangerous. In such cases I must immediately post the parameters to the world webpage for confirmation of dangerous asteroids. (Note: This refers to the Near-Earth Object Confirmation Page for confirming near-Earth objects and potentially hazardous objects.) I posted it and wrote that the object was diffuse and that it was not an asteroid, but a comet.

2I/Borisov's interstellar origin required a couple of weeks to confirm. Early orbital solutions based on initial observations included the possibility that the comet could be a near-Earth object 1.4 AU from the Sun in an elliptical orbit with an orbital period of less than 1 year. Later using 151 observations over 12 days, NASA Jet Propulsion Laboratory's Scout gave an eccentricity range of 2.9–4.5. But with an observation arc of only 12 days, there was still some doubt that it was interstellar because the observations were at a low solar elongation, which could introduce biases in the data such as differential refraction. Using large non-gravitational forces on the highly eccentric orbit, a solution could be generated with an eccentricity of about 1, an Earth minimum orbit intersection distance (MOID) of 0.34 AU (51 million km), and a perihelion at 0.90 AU around 30 December 2019. However, based on available observations, the orbit could only be parabolic if non-gravitational forces (thrust due to outgassing) affected its orbit more than any previous comets. Eventually with more observations the orbit converged to the hyperbolic solution that indicated an interstellar origin and non-gravitational forces could not explain the motion.

=== Observation ===
Hubble started observations of 2I/Borisov in October 2019, two months prior to the comet's closest approach to the Sun.

The last observations were in September 2020, nine months after perihelion. Observation of 2I/Borisov was aided by the fact that the comet was detected while inbound towards the Solar System. ʻOumuamua had been discovered as it was leaving the system, and thus could only be observed for 80 days before it was out of range. Because of its closest approach occurring near traditional year-end holidays, and the capability to have extended observations, some astronomers have called 2I/Borisov a "Christmas comet". Observations using the Hubble Space Telescope began on 12 October, when the comet moved far enough from the Sun to be safely observed by the telescope. With its high angular resolution from above the Earth's atmosphere, Hubble could better separate the nucleus from the coma. The motion of jet-like structures in the coma indicate a 4.3-hour rotation period for the nucleus.

=== Comet chemistry ===
A preliminary (low-resolution) visible spectrum of 2I/Borisov indicated that it was similar to typical Oort Cloud comets. Its color indexes resembled the Solar System's long period comets. Emissions at 388 nm indicated the presence of cyanide (formula CN), which is typically the first molecule detected in Solar System comets. This was the first detection of gas emissions from an interstellar object. The non-detection of diatomic carbon C_{2} was reported in October 2019, with the ratio C_{2} to CN being less than 0.3. Diatomic carbon was positively detected in November 2019, with a measured C_{2} to CN ratio of 0.2±0.1. This resembled carbon-chain depleted comets or rare blue-colored carbon monoxide comets like C/2016 R2. By the end of November 2019, C_{2} production had dramatically increased, and the C_{2} to CN ratio reached 0.61, coinciding with the appearance of bright amine (NH_{2}) bands. Estimates for the outgassing of water, based on the detection of atomic oxygen, indicated a rate similar to Solar System comets. In September 2019, neither water nor hydroxyl (OH) lines were directly detected. The first unambiguous detection of OH lines was made on 1 November 2019, and OH production peaked in early December 2019.

=== Suspected nucleus fragmentation ===
The comet came within about 2 AU of the Sun, a distance at which many small comets have been found to disintegrate. The probability that a comet disintegrates strongly depends on the size of its nucleus; Guzik et al. estimated a probability of 10% that this would happen to 2I/Borisov. Jewitt and Luu compared 2I/Borisov to C/2019 J2 (Palomar), another comet of similar size that disintegrated in May 2019 at a distance of 1.9 AU from the Sun.

A severe outburst in February–March 2020 led to suspected "ongoing nucleus fragmentation" from the comet by 12 March. The Hubble Space Telescope can be used to study the fragmentation of small comet nuclei, and images taken on 30 March 2020 showed a non-stellar core indicating that 2I/Borisov has ejected sunward a large fragment. The ejection is estimated to have begun around 7 March, and may have occurred during one of the outbursts that occurred near that time.

A follow-up study, reported on 6 April 2020, observed only a single object, and noted that the fragment had vanished. Later analysis of the event showed that the ejected dust and fragments had a combined mass of only about 0.1% of the total mass of the nucleus, making it a large outburst rather than a fragmentation.

== Exploration ==
The high hyperbolic excess velocity of 2I/Borisov of 32 km/s makes it hard for a spacecraft to reach the comet with existing technology: according to a team of the Initiative for Interstellar Studies, a 202-kilogram (445 lb) spacecraft could theoretically have been sent in July 2018 to intercept 2I/Borisov using a Falcon Heavy-class launcher, or 765 kg (1,687 lb) on a Space Launch System (SLS)-class booster, but only if the object had been discovered much earlier than it was to meet the optimal launch date. Launches after the actual discovery date would eliminate the possibility to use Falcon Heavy-class rockets, requiring Oberth maneuvres near Jupiter and near the Sun and a larger launch vehicle. Even an SLS-class launcher would only have been able to deliver a 3 kg (6.6 lb) payload (such as a CubeSat) into a trajectory that would intercept 2I/Borisov in 2045 at a relative speed of 34 km/s. According to congressional testimony, NASA may need at least five years of preparation to launch such an intercepting mission.

== See also ==
- 3I/ATLAS – the third interstellar interloper
- C/1980 E1 (Bowell) – the most eccentric comet known in the Solar System with an eccentricity of 1.057
- List of Solar System objects by greatest aphelion
