= Messier marathon =

Astronomy competition

Plot of the Messier objects relative to the modern constellations, ecliptic, and Milky Way, using equatorial coordinates (right ascension, declination)

A Messier marathon is an attempt, usually organized by amateur astronomers, to find as many Messier objects as possible during one night. The Messier catalogue was compiled by French astronomer Charles Messier during the late 18th century and consists of 110 relatively bright deep-sky objects (galaxies, nebulae, and star clusters).

== When and where a marathon is possible ==
The number of Messier objects visible in any one night varies depending on a few factors, including the location of the observer, the duration of daylight and nighttime, and the season (the positions of the Messier objects relative to the Sun varies with the season, as does the length of the night).

=== Location ===
Because Messier compiled his catalog from a northern latitude, not all of the Messier objects are visible from the southern hemisphere. In particular, M81, M82, M52, and M103 make southern-hemisphere Messier marathons difficult, because they are all located at a declination of 60° north or greater. Although a Messier marathon can be attempted from any northern latitude, low northern latitudes are best. In particular, a latitude of around 25° north lends the best possibility to complete a Messier marathon at the right time of year.

=== Season ===
At low northern latitudes, particularly around latitude 25° north, it is possible to observe all Messier objects in one night during a window of a few weeks from mid-March to early April. In that period the dark nights around the time of the new moon are best for a Messier marathon.

=== Other times of year ===
Less complete Messier marathons can be undertaken at other times of the year, with the actual quantity of Messier objects seen depending upon season and location. In particular, there is a short period around the autumnal equinox when most of the objects can be seen.

== The marathon ==
The Messier Marathon was invented independently by American astronomers Tom Hoffelder, Donald Machholz, and Tom Reiland in the 1970s. Typically an observer attempting a Messier marathon begins observing at sundown and will observe through the night until sunrise in order to see all 110 objects. An observer starts with objects low in the western sky at sunset, hoping to view them before they dip out of view, then works eastward across the sky. By sunrise, the successful observer will be observing the last few objects low on the eastern horizon, hoping to see them before the sky becomes too bright due to the rising sun. The evening can be a test of stamina and willpower depending on weather conditions and the physical fitness of the observer. Particularly crowded regions of the sky (namely, the Virgo Cluster and the Milky Way's Galactic Center) can prove to be challenging to an observer as well, and a Messier marathon will generally budget time for these regions accordingly.

== Organized marathons ==
Marathons are typically organized by a local astronomy organization or astronomical society as a special type of star party. These are usually attempted at least once every year. Some clubs issue certificates/awards either for participation or for achieving a set number of objects.

== See also ==
- List of Messier objects
