= Michael Jäger (astronomer) =

Michael Jäger (born 1958 in Vienna) is an Austrian editor, amateur astronomer and discoverer of comets.

Since 1980, Jäger works as an editor for the newspaper Kurier. From 2005, he led the Lower Austrian editorial department, and since 2010, he leads the chronicle department.

Since 1982, Jäger is engaged in the observation of comets. Until now (as of January 2015), he was able to record over 500 of these celestial bodies. On 28 August 1994, Jäger discovered a comet fragment that had separated from the comet 141P/Machholz. On 23 October 1998, he discovered the comet 290P/Jäger.

In 1999, Jäger was awarded the Edgar Wilson Award for his discovery of a comet. In the same year, he became the first winner of the VdS Medal (Vds Medaille), awarded by the German Vereinigung der Sternfreunde. In May 2004, the asteroid 78391 Michaeljäger was named in his honor. On 24 June 2014 Jäger was presented the Decoration of Honour in Silver of the province of Lower Austria for his journalistic work.
