= C/2019 J2 (Palomar) =

Non-periodic comet

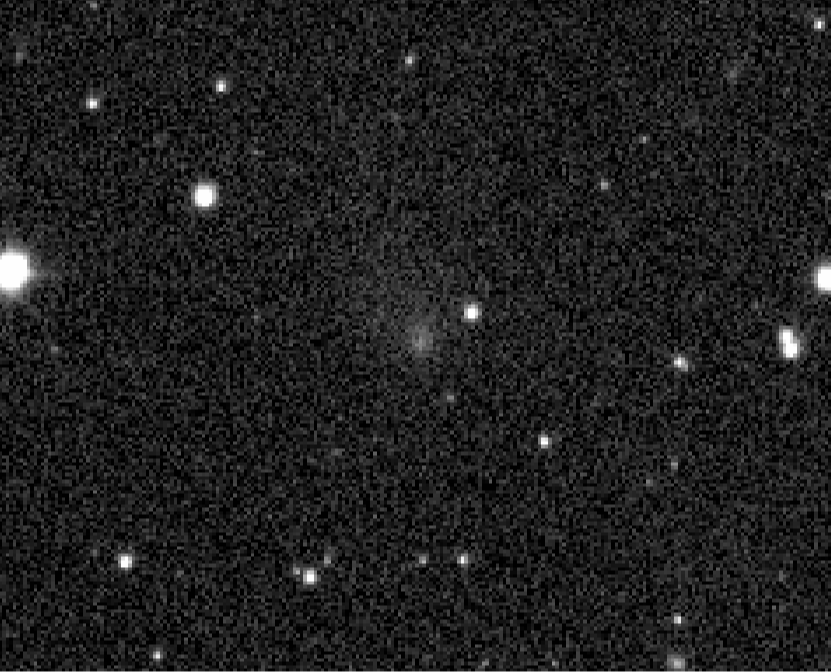
- The remnants of Comet Palomar imaged from the Zwicky Transient Facility on 2 July 2019

Discovery
- Discovery site: Palomar Observatory
- Discovery date: 27 April 2019

Designations
- Alternative designations: CK19J020

Orbital characteristics
- Epoch: 10 June 2019 (JD 2458644.5)
- Observation arc: 96 days
- Number of observations: 312
- Aphelion: ~1,480 AU
- Perihelion: 1.727 AU
- Semi-major axis: ~742 AU
- Eccentricity: 0.99767
- Orbital period: ~20,200 years
- Inclination: 105.14°
- Longitude of ascending node: 25.468°
- Argument of periapsis: 98.696°
- Mean anomaly: 359.99°
- Last perihelion: 19 July 2019
- T_{Jupiter}: –0.418
- Earth MOID: 1.327 AU
- Jupiter MOID: 0.511 AU

Physical characteristics
- Mean radius: ~0.4 km (0.25 mi)
- Comet total magnitude (M1): 9.4
- Comet nuclear magnitude (M2): 17.4
- Apparent magnitude: 14.6 (2019 apparition)

C/2019 J2 (Palomar) was a non-periodic comet that was discovered from the Palomar Observatory in April 2019. The object was reported by Quanzhi Ye as a comet on 9 May 2019 after detecting a fan-shaped tail about 10–15 arcseconds in length.

== Disintegration ==
On 24 May 2019, the comet began to disintegrate at a distance of 1.9 AU (280 million km) from the Sun, after experiencing a strong outburst nearly 56 days before reaching perihelion. Further observations by the Zwicky Transient Facility between 6 and 9 July 2019 have shown that the comet lost its central condensation, indicating that its nucleus were completely destroyed. It is likely believed that strong outgassing have led to rotational disruption of its roughly 0.4 km (0.25 mi) nucleus, causing it to fully disintegrate a month after its initial outburst in May. A similar event also occurred to 2I/Borisov a few months later.
