= Donald Machholz =

American amateur astronomer (1952–2022)

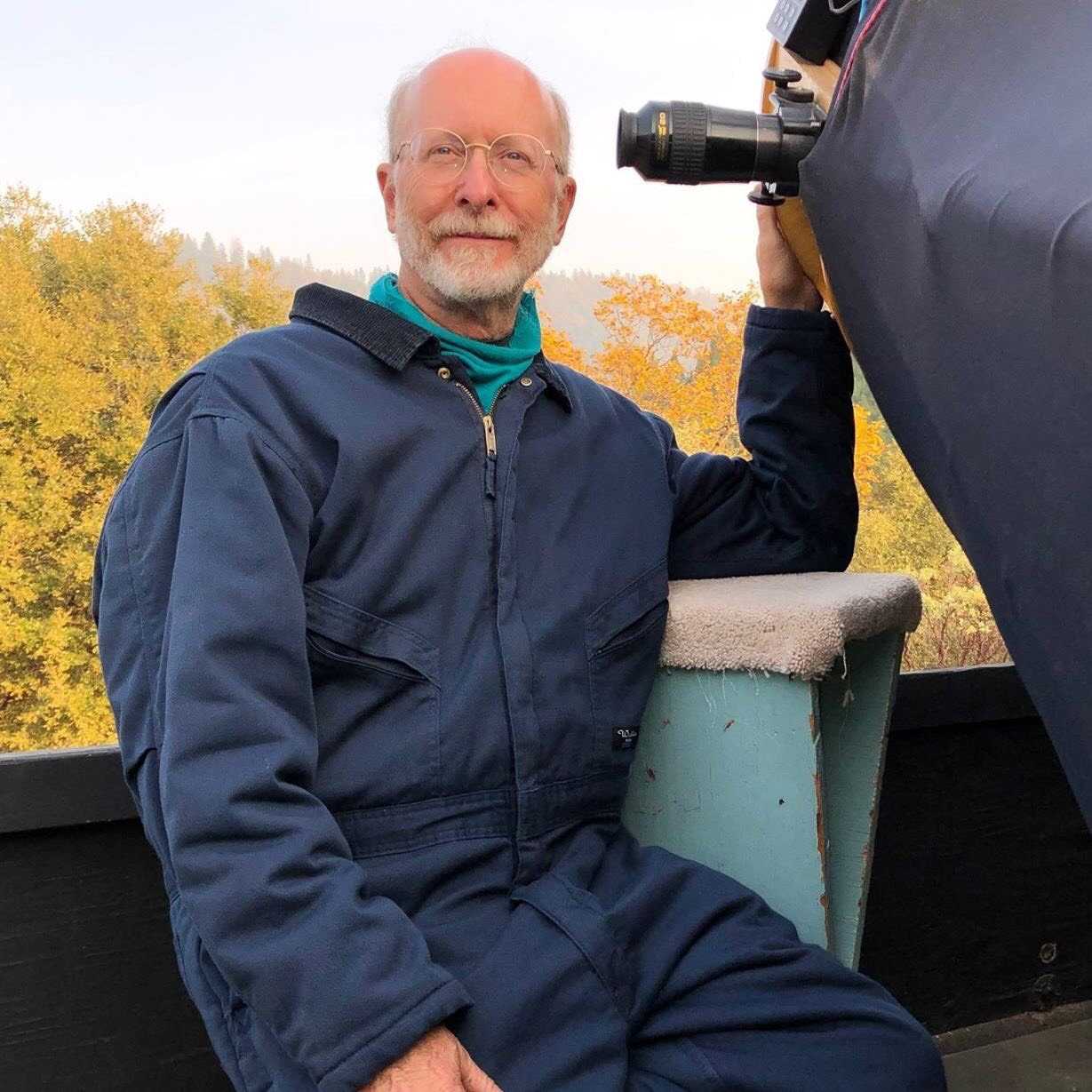
- Machholz in November 2019
- Born: Donald Edward Machholz; October 7, 1952; Portsmouth, Virginia, U.S.
- Died: August 9, 2022 (aged 69); Wikieup, Arizona, U.S.
- Occupation: Amateur astronomer
- Years active: 1970–2022
- Spouse: Michele Machholz (m. 2014)

Donald Edward Machholz (October 7, 1952 – August 9, 2022) was an American amateur astronomer who was credited with the discovery of 12 comets that bear his name.

== Personal life and death ==
In 2014, he married photojournalist Michele Machholz. They resided at the Stargazer Ranch in Wikieup, Arizona.

Machholz died in the early morning of August 9, 2022, at his home in Wikieup, Arizona, from complications of COVID-19. His obituary at Astronomy stated, "In the years leading up to his death, Machholz was considered the most prolific visual comet discoverer alive."

== Career ==
He spent more than 9,000 hours comet hunting in a career spanning over 50 years. These comets include the periodic comets 96P/Machholz, 141P/Machholz, the non-periodic comets, C/1978 R3 (Machholz), C/2004 Q2 (Machholz) that were visible with binoculars in the northern sky in 2004 and 2005, C/2010 F4 (Machholz), and C/2018 V1 (Machholz-Fujikawa-Iwamoto) In 1985, comet Machholz 1985-e, was discovered using a homemade cardboard telescope with a wide aperture, 10 inches across, that gave it a broader field of view than most commercial telescopes. Machholz utilized a variety of methods in his comet discoveries, in 1986 using 29×130 binoculars he discovered 96P/Machholz.

Machholz was one of the inventors of the Messier Marathon, which is a race to observe all the Messier objects in a single night.

Asteroid 245983 Machholz, discovered by Kazimieras Černis, was named in honor of Machholz in November 2017.

=== Comets discovered ===
- 1978 Comet Machholz (1978l)
- 1985 Comet Machholz (1985e)
- 1986 Comet 96P/Machholz
- 1988 Comet Machholz (1988j)
- 1992 Comet Tanaka-Machholz (1992d)
- 1992 Comet Machholz (1992k)
- 1994 Comet Nakamura-Nishimura-Machholz (1994m)
- 1994 Comet 141P/Machholz 2
- 1994 Comet Machholz 1994r
- 2004 C/2004 Q2 (Machholz)
- 2010 C/2010 F4 (Machholz)
- 2018 C/2018 V1 (Machholz-Fujikawa-Iwamoto)

== Awards and honors ==
- 1978 Tuthill Comet Award Roger Tuthill for discovering Comet Machholz (1978l)
- 1985 Tuthill Comet Award Roger Tuthill for discovering Comet Machholz (1986e)
- 1986 Tuthill Comet Award Roger Tuthill for discovering Periodic Comet Machholz 1 (1986e)
- 1994 Walter H. Haas Award Association of Lunar and Planetary Observers
- 1995 Machholz was the recipient of the G. Bruce Blair Medal
- 2000 Peggy Haas Service Award Association of Lunar and Planetary Observers Service to Association of Lunar and Planetary Observers
- 2005 Edgar Wilson Award Harvard's Smithsonian Astrophysical Observatory for discovering Comet Machholz C/2004 Q2
- 2010 Edgar Wilson Award Harvard's Smithsonian Astrophysical Observatory for discovering Comet Machholz C/2010 F4
- 2017 Asteroid 245983 Machholz discovered by Kazimieras Černis was named in honor of Donald Machholz in November 2017
- 2018 Edgar Wilson Award Harvard's Smithsonian Astrophysical Observatory for discovering Comet C/2018 V1 Machholz-Fujikawa-Iwamoto
- 2021 Leslie C. Peltier Award Astronomical League for the visual discovery of 12 comets and contributions to astronomy

== Books ==
- The Observing Guide to the Messier Marathon: A Handbook and Atlas
- Decade of Comets: A Study of the 33 Comets Discovered by Amateur Astronomers Between 1975 and 1984
- An observer's guide to comet Hale-Bopp: Making the most of Comet Hale-Bopp: when and where to observe Comet Hale-Bopp and what to look for

== General references ==
- Associated Press (June 16, 1985) "Amateur Astronomer Nails Down His Second Comet" Los Angeles Times Retrieved December 29, 2016
- Jet Propulsion Laboratory (October 14, 1994) "MACHHOLZ'S BANNER YEAR" Jet Propulsion Laboratory
- Library of Congress (2002) "Machholz, Don 1952–" Library of Congress
- Joe Rao (September 17, 2004) "Newfound Comet Set for Winter Display" Space.com
- Debi Drake (May 22, 2005) "Meet The Comet Hunter: Don Machholz" American Profile AMG/Parade
- Alan MacRobert (December 2, 2008) "A Very Oddball Comet" Sky & Telescope Retrieved December 2, 2008
- Jeanna Bryner (December 2, 2008) "Odd Comet Possibly from Another Star System" Space.com
- Roger W. Sinnott (March 27, 2010) "New Comet Machholz" Sky & Telescope Retrieved March 30, 2010.
- Brooks Hays (November 3, 2017) "SOHO Spacecraft Spots Comet Machholz 96P, A Return Visitor" UPI
- Gareth V. Williams (November 11, 2018) "MPEC 2018-V151: COMET C/2018 V1 (Machholz-Fujikawa-Iwamoto)" Minor Planet Center.
- Bob King (November 9, 2018) "Amateur Don Machholz Discovers His 12th Comet!" Sky & Telescope
- MPEC 2018-V151: COMET C/2018 V1 (Machholz-Fujikawa-Iwamoto)
- Bob King (November 11, 2018) Arizona Amateur Discovers New Dawn Comet — Here’s How To Find It
- Comet C/2018 V1 (Machholz-Fujikawa-Iwamoto) Sky Charts and Coordinates
- JPL viewer NASA
