= Comet Holmes =

Jupiter-family comet

17P/Holmes
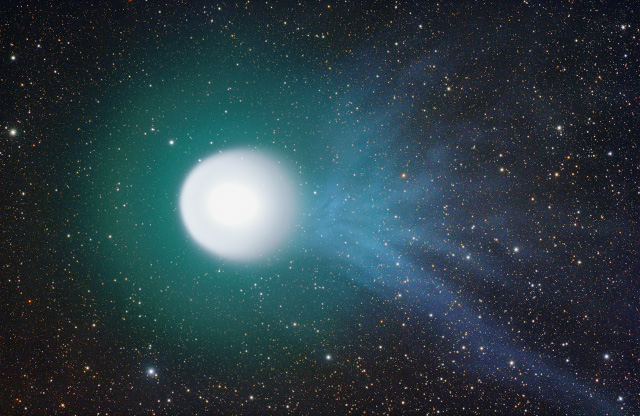
- Outburst of Comet Holmes photographed by Iván Éder on 4 November 2007

Discovery
- Discovered by: Edwin Holmes
- Discovery date: 6 November 1892

Designations
- MPC designation: P/1892 V1, P/1899 L1; P/1964 O1
- Alternative designations: 1892 III, 1899 II, 1906 III, 1964 X, 1972 I, 1979 IV, 1986 V, 1993 VII, 1892f, 1899d, 1906f, 1964i, 1971b, 1979f, 1986f, 1993i

Orbital characteristics
- Epoch: 21 November 2025 (JD 2461000.5)
- Observation arc: 130.21 years (Note: Observation arc from the Minor Planet Center database only covered dates from 9 November 1892 until 22 January 2023 (130.20 years). This figure included its entire arc up to 6 November 1892.)
- Number of observations: 6,025
- Aphelion: 5.194 AU
- Perihelion: 2.090 AU
- Semi-major axis: 3.642 AU
- Eccentricity: 0.42616
- Orbital period: 6.951 years
- Inclination: 19.005°
- Longitude of ascending node: 326.60°
- Argument of periapsis: 24.603°
- Mean anomaly: 246.31°
- Last perihelion: 19 February 2021
- Next perihelion: 31 January 2028
- T_{Jupiter}: 2.859
- Earth MOID: 1.073 AU
- Jupiter MOID: 0.481 AU

Physical characteristics
- Mean radius: 1.71 km (1.06 mi)
- Mean density: 0.09±0.02 g/cm^{3}
- Spectral type: (V–R) = 0.41±0.07; (R−I) = 0.44±0.08
- Comet total magnitude (M1): 9.4
- Comet nuclear magnitude (M2): 13.8

Comet Holmes /ˈhoʊmz/ (official designation: 17P/Holmes) is a periodic comet in the Solar System, discovered by the British amateur astronomer Edwin Holmes on November 6, 1892. Although normally a very faint object, Holmes became notable during its October 2007 return when it temporarily brightened by a factor of a million, in what was the largest known outburst by a comet, and became visible to the naked eye. It also briefly became the largest object in the Solar System, as its coma (the thin dissipating dust ball around the comet) expanded to a diameter greater than that of the Sun (although its mass remained minuscule). Between 1857–2106 perihelion remains between 2.05–2.36 AU.

It is the only comet discovered by Edwin Holmes. (Note: There is another Comet Holmes, designated as C/2008 N1. However, this one is discovered by Robert E. Holmes, Jr. of Charleston, USA.)

== Discovery ==
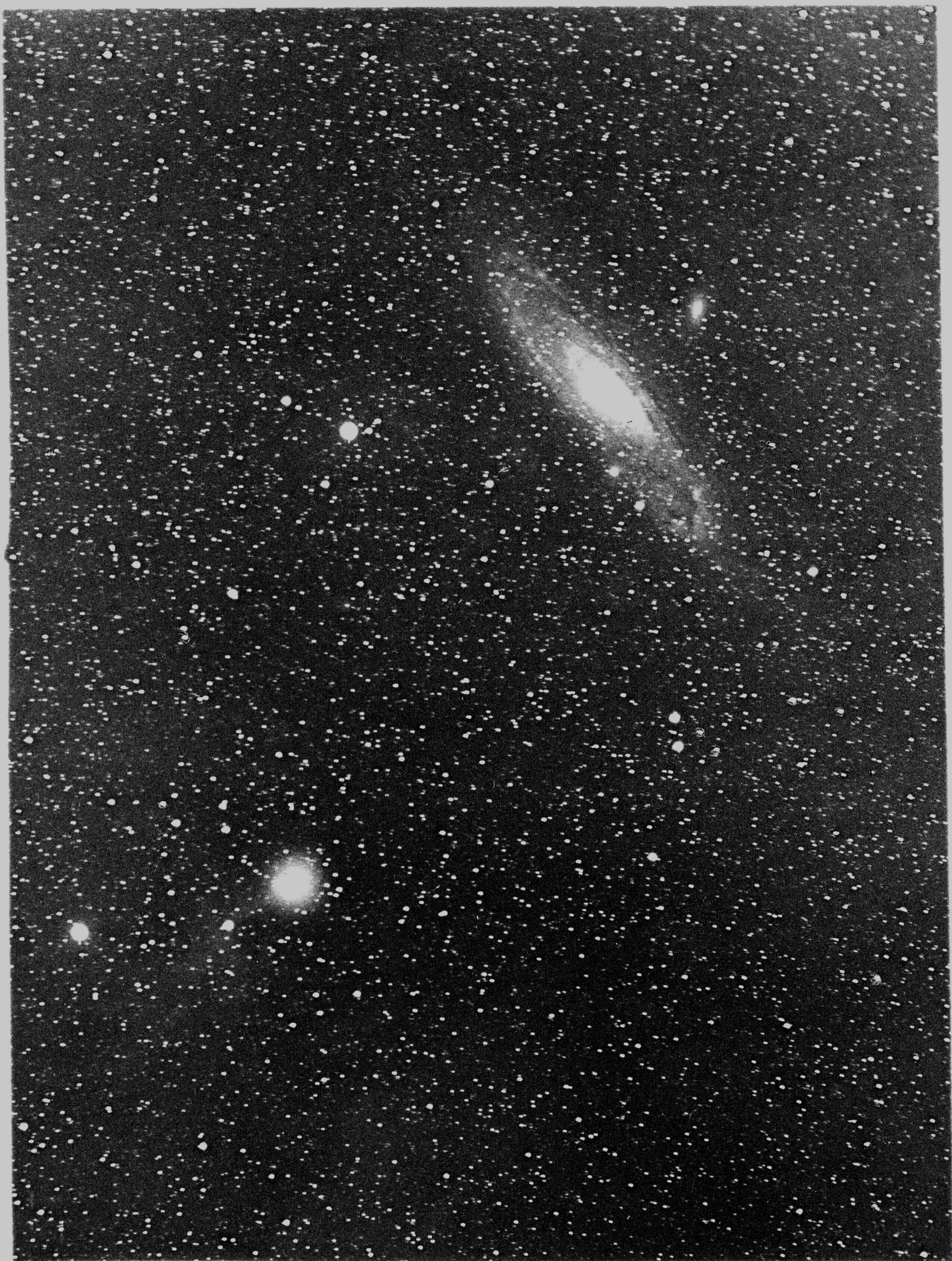
Observation of 17P/Holmes by Edward E. Barnard on 10 November 1892, near the Andromeda Galaxy.

Comet Holmes was discovered by Edwin Holmes on November 6, 1892, while he was conducting regular observations of the Andromeda Galaxy (M31). Its discovery in 1892 was possible because of an increase in its magnitude similar to the 2007 outburst; it brightened to an approximate magnitude of 4 or 5 before fading from visibility over a period of several weeks.

The comet's discovery was confirmed by Edward Walter Maunder (Royal Observatory, Greenwich, England), William Henry Maw (Kensington, London, England), and B. Kidd (Bramley, Surrey, England). Independent discoveries were made by Thomas David Anderson (Edinburgh, Scotland) on November 8 and by Mike Brown (Wilkes, USA) and by John Ewen Davidson (Mackay, Queensland, Australia) on November 9.

The first calculations of the elliptical orbit of 17P/Holmes were done independently by Heinrich Kreutz and George Mary Searle. Additional orbits eventually established the perihelion date as June 13 and the orbital period as 6.9 years. These calculations proved that the comet was not a return of Biela's Comet.

The 1899 and 1906 appearances were observed, but the comet was subsequently lost after 1906 until it was recovered on 16 July 1964, by Elizabeth Roemer (US Naval Observatory Flagstaff Station, Arizona, United States). Aided by the computer predictions of Brian G. Marsden, the comet has been observed on every subsequent return.

== 2007 outburst ==
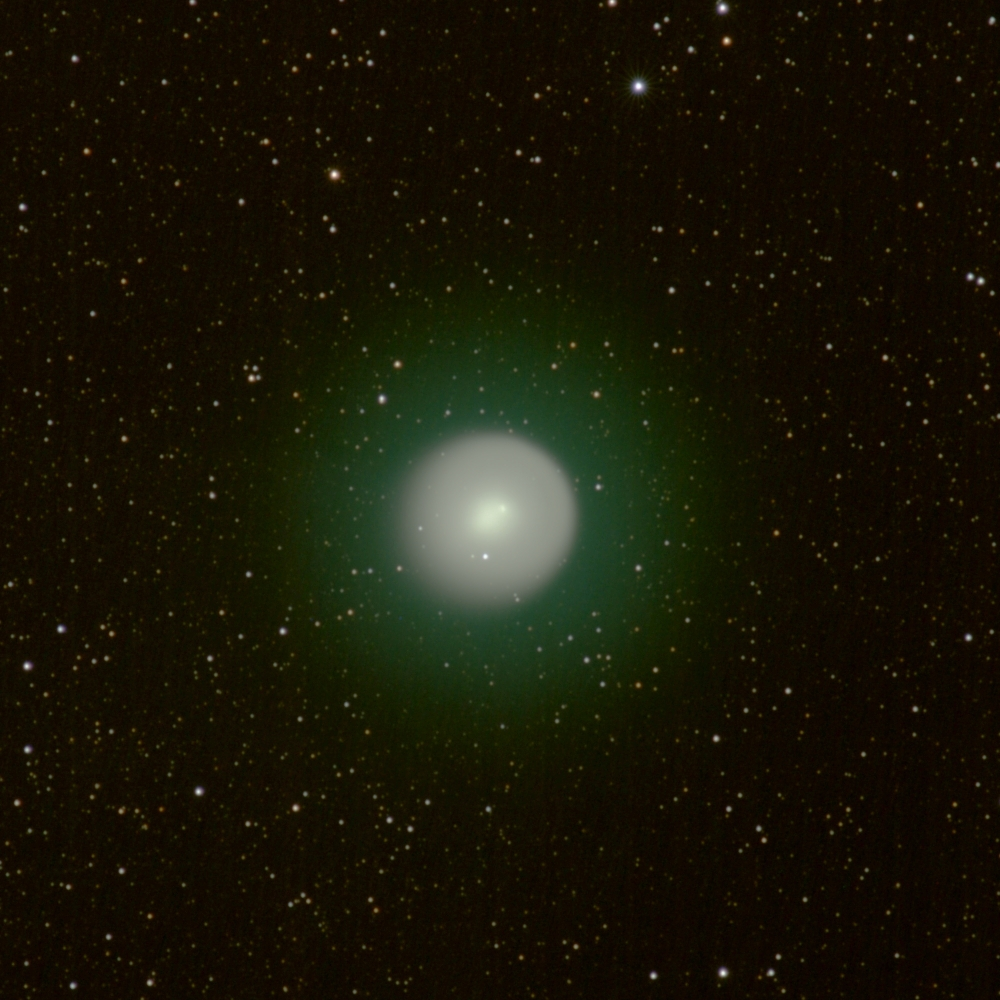
Comet 17P/Holmes on 2 November 2007

During its 2007 return, Holmes unexpectedly brightened from a magnitude of about 17 to about 2.8 in a period of only 42 hours, making it visible to the naked eye. This represents a change of brightness by a factor of a million and is the largest known outburst by a comet thus far. The outburst took place from October 23 to 24, 2007. The first person reportedly to notice a change was J. A. Henríquez Santana on Tenerife in the Canary Islands; minutes later, Ramón Naves in Barcelona noticed the comet at magnitude 7.3. It became easily visible to the naked eye as a bright yellow "star" in Perseus, and by October 25 17P/Holmes appeared as the third-brightest "star" in that constellation.

Although large telescopes had already shown fine-scale cometary details, naked-eye observers saw Holmes as merely star-like until October 26. After that date, 17P/Holmes began to appear more comet-like to naked-eye observers. This is because during the comet's outburst, its orbit took it to near opposition with respect to Earth, and because comet tails point away from the Sun, Earth observers were looking nearly straight down along the tail of 17P/Holmes, making the comet appear as a bright sphere.

Holmes's nucleus is estimated at 1.71 km (1.06 mi) in radius.

Comet Holmes not only became brighter, but its coma (nebulous envelope around the nucleus) expanded. In late October 2007 the coma's apparent diameter increased from 3.3 arcminutes to over 13 arcminutes, about half the diameter of the Moon in the sky. At a distance of around 2 AU, this means that the true diameter of the coma had swelled to over 1 million km, (Note: 2 AU×(~150 Gm/AU)×sin(13 arcmin) ≈ 1.1 million km) or about 70% of the diameter of the Sun. By comparison, the Moon is 380,000 km (240,000 mi) from Earth. Therefore, during the 2007 outburst of Comet Holmes the coma was a sphere wider than the diameter of the Moon's orbit around Earth. In November 2007, the coma had dispersed to a volume larger than the Sun, briefly giving it the largest extended atmosphere in the Solar System.

The cause of the outburst is not definitely known. The huge cloud of gas and dust may have resulted from a collision with a meteoroid, or, more probably, from a build-up of gas inside the comet's nucleus that eventually broke through the surface. However, researchers at the Max Planck Institute suggest in a paper published in Astronomy and Astrophysics that the brightening can be explained by a thick, air-tight dust cover and the effects of H_{2}O sublimation, with the comet's porous structure providing more surface area for sublimation, up to one order of magnitude greater. Energy from the Sun – insolation – was stored in the dust cover and the nucleus within the months before the outburst. Models in a 2012 study revealed that the comet undergoes a recurring outburst pattern roughly every 30 years, with one near-perihelion outburst roughly every 100 years.

The comet remained visible in February 2008 though it had become a challenging target at about magnitude +5 in the constellation Perseus. It had expanded to greater than 2 degrees of arc as seen from Earth, and thus had very little surface brightness. Notably the comet 17P/Holmes dust trail from the 2007 outburst repeatedly converges at the original site.

An outburst of 3–4 magnitudes occurred in January 2015, but still required a large telescope to be seen.

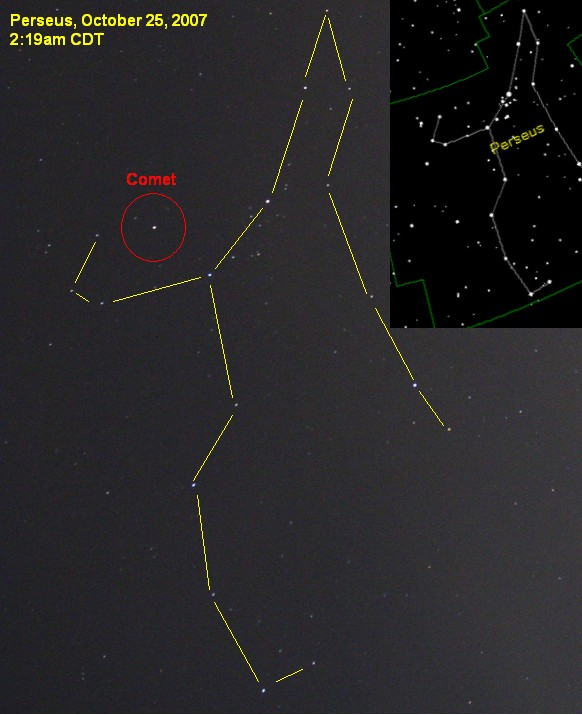
On 25 October, the comet looked liked a bright new star in the constellation of Perseus.

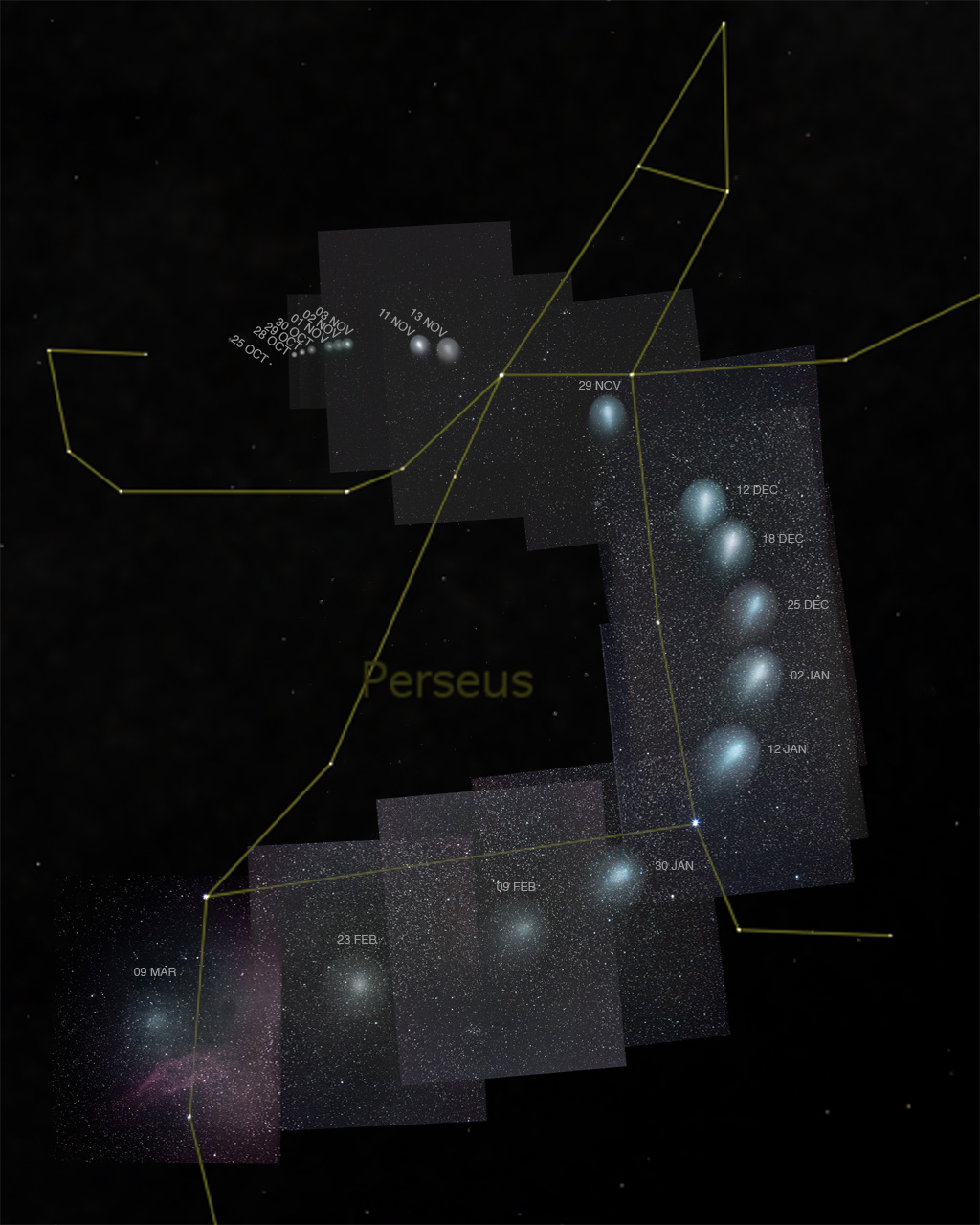
This photo composite shows the comet's size and motion in the constellation Perseus from 25 October 2007 through 9 March 2008.

Motion with expanding dust cloud
A simulation showing the angular diameter of the expanding dust cloud for 120 days past the initial event on 24 October. The surface brightness decreased over time.

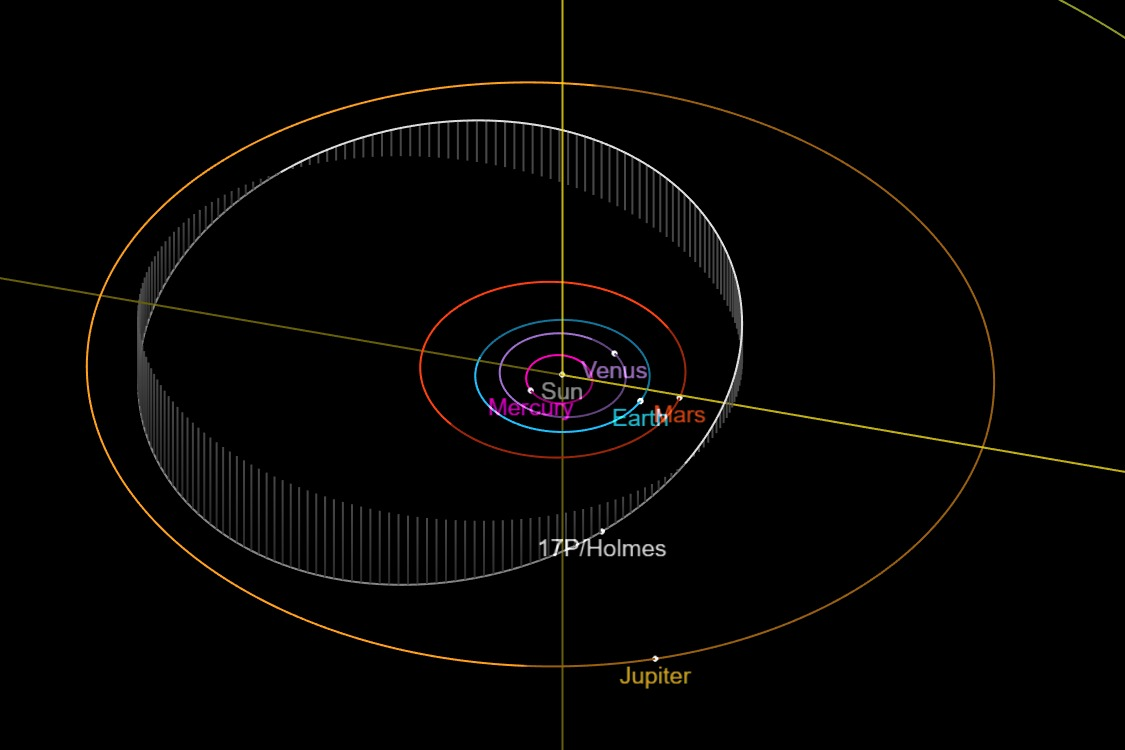
17P/Holmes is a periodic comet in an inclined and elliptical orbit. The comet was closest to the Sun on 4 May 2007.

Animation of Comet Holmes's orbit from 1 January 2011 to 31 December 2017
17P/Holmes · Earth · Mars · Jupiter

== Notes ==
Numbered comets
Previous; 16P/Brooks	Comet Holmes	Next; 18D/Perrine–Mrkos
