= Edwin Holmes (astronomer) =

English astronomer

Edwin Alfred Holmes (1839–1919) was an English amateur astronomer who is best remembered as the discoverer of Comet 17P/Holmes.

== Amateur Astronomer ==
Edwin Holmes was born in Sheffield, Yorkshire, in 1839. He later moved to London where he worked as a seller of glass. He lived at Hornsey Rise in North London from where he observed with a 12-inch aperture reflecting telescope he had manufactured himself. His targets included double stars.

Holmes was a regular contributor to the British Astronomical Association and to the magazine The English Mechanic and World of Science. He became well known for his letters to the English Mechanic, often robustly criticising the opinions of other amateur astronomers, occasionally causing controversy. In particular, he argued for the use of reflecting telescopes in preference to refractors of similar cost.

== The Discovery of Comet 17P/Holmes ==
Edwin Holmes discovered the periodic comet 17P/Holmes on 6 November 1892, and his discovery was confirmed within days at the Royal Observatory Greenwich.

Holmes discovered the comet after it suddenly brightened, allowing him to notice it close in the sky to the great Andromeda Galaxy. The comet remained visible to the unaided eye for another three weeks until it faded away. 75 days later the comet once again brightened to naked-eye visibility.

Holmes was later awarded the Donohoe Comet Medal of the Astronomical Society of the Pacific. He was appointed an associate of the Astronomical Society of Wales, a form of honorary membership.
