= C/1978 R3 (Machholz) =

Hyperbolic comet

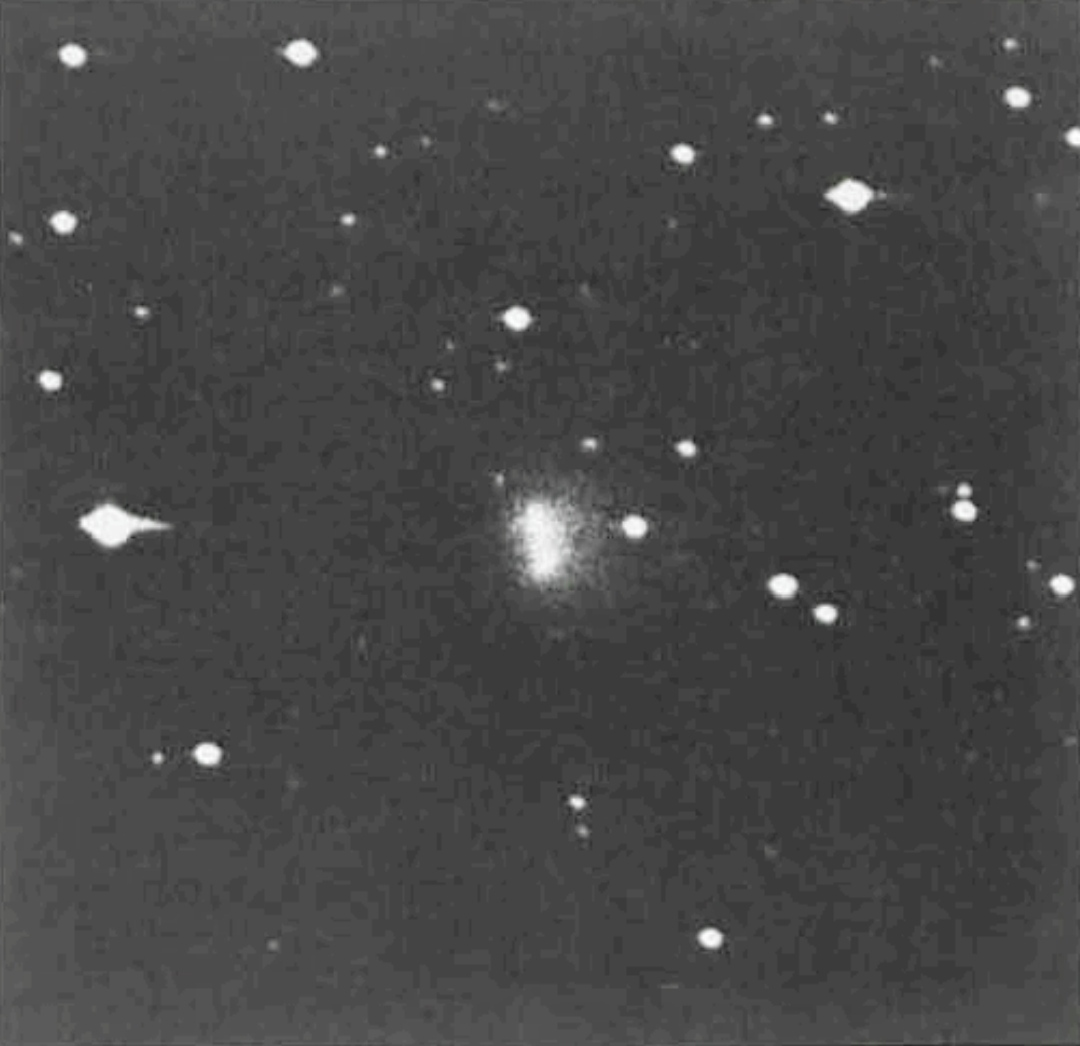
- C/1978 R3 (Machholz) taken by Hans-Emil Schuster from ESO on 14 September 1978

Discovery
- Discovered by: Donald Machholz
- Discovery site: Los Gatos, California
- Discovery date: 13 September 1978

Designations
- Alternative designations: 1978 XIII, 1978l

Orbital characteristics
- Epoch: 2 November 1978 (JD 2443814.5)
- Observation arc: 322 days
- Number of observations: 46
- Perihelion: 1.772 AU
- Eccentricity: 1.00028
- Inclination: 130.64°
- Longitude of ascending node: 290.68°
- Argument of periapsis: 224.75°
- Mean anomaly: 0.0002°
- Last perihelion: 13 August 1978
- Earth MOID: 0.942 AU
- Jupiter MOID: 1.672 AU
- Comet total magnitude (M1): 8.3

Comet Machholz, formally designated as C/1978 R3, is a hyperbolic comet that was observed throughout late 1978. It is the first of 12 comets discovered by American astronomer, Donald Machholz. He found the comet on 12 September 1978 while observing with a 25-cm reflector telescope from Los Gatos, California. He described it as a diffuse object without central condensation with an apparent magnitude of about 11. The first parabolic orbit, calculated by M. P. Candy, indicated that at the moment of discovery the comet was past its perihelion and it was approaching Earth.
