= 141P/Machholz =

Periodic comet

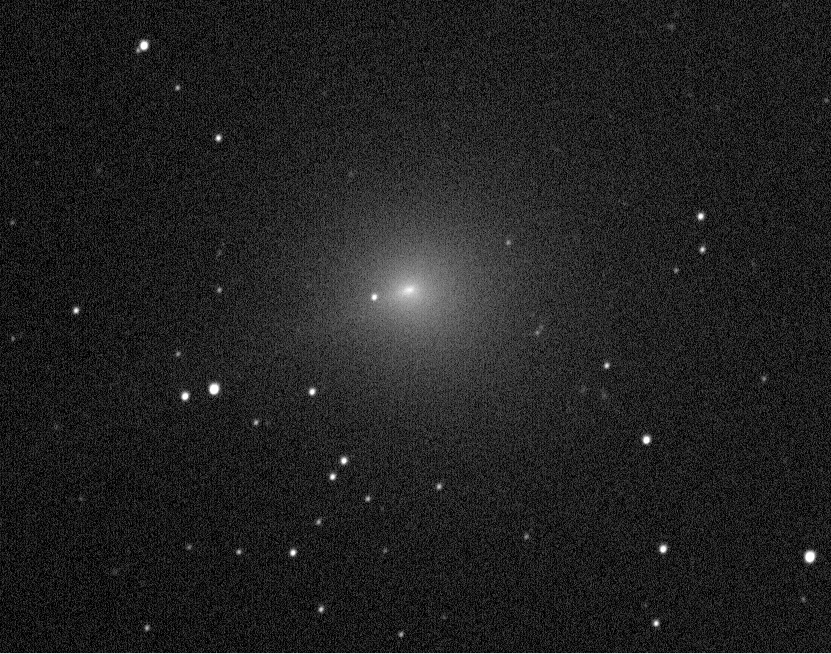
- Comet Machholz 2 photographed from the Zwicky Transient Facility on 10 January 2021

Discovery
- Discovered by: Donald E. Machholz
- Discovery date: 13 August 1994

Designations
- MPC designation: P/1994 P1, P/1999 P1
- Alternative designations: Machholz 2; 1994 XXVI, 1994o

Orbital characteristics
- Epoch: 30 April 2026 (JD 2461160.5)
- Observation arc: 26.61 years
- Number of observations: 1,815
- Aphelion: 5.305 AU
- Perihelion: 0.807 AU
- Semi-major axis: 3.056 AU
- Eccentricity: 0.73581
- Orbital period: 5.343 years
- Inclination: 13.961°
- Longitude of ascending node: 241.77°
- Argument of periapsis: 153.65°
- Mean anomaly: 1.266°
- Last perihelion: 16 December 2020
- Next perihelion: 23 April 2026; 1 May 2026 (I)
- T_{Jupiter}: 2.709
- Earth MOID: 0.099 AU (14.8 million km)
- Jupiter MOID: 0.56 AU (84 million km)

Physical characteristics
- Mean radius: 0.25 km (0.16 mi) (A)
- Comet total magnitude (M1): 17.3

Comet 141P/Machholz or 141P/Machholz 2 is a Jupiter-family comet with an orbital period of 5.3 years. It was discovered by Donald Machholz on 13 August 1994. A few days after the discovery a number of condensations were found near the main component of the comet, indicating that the comet had fragmented between 1987 and 1989, during its previous perihelion. The comet was last observed by the Vera C. Rubin Observatory in July 2025.

== Observational history ==
The comet was discovered visually on 13 August 1994 by Donald E. Machholz, using a 0.25m reflector telescope. The comet then had an estimated apparent magnitude of 10. On 18 August 1994, Michael Jäger reported that a fragment was located 48 arcminutes northeast of the comet. Three more fragments were then found. The fragments were given the letters A to E, with A being the main component. Component D was found to be split in two on 5 October 1994, with the two components being 7 arcseconds apart. The fragments formed two groups; And B formed the southern group and C, D, and E formed the north group. A dust trail connected all the components. Fragment B faded rapidly in November 1994 while fragment D was observed during the 1999 apparition.

Zdenek Sekanina estimated that the first break-up of the comet took place in late 1987, about 600 days before the 1989 perihelion, that lead to the creation of fragment B. The next break-up event took place around the 1989 perihelion and lead to the creation of fragments C and D. Fragment D split 600 days after perihelion, leading to the creation of fragment E. Fragment D split further during the 1994 perihelion.

Fragment A was recovered by Robert H. McNaught at Siding Spring Observatory on 3 August 1999 as a stellar object, while no other fragment was visible at that point. During the 2015 apparition one more fragment was found, fragment H. It was originally considered to be a new comet, but further observations led to it being linked with 141P/Machholz. During the 2020-21 apparition one more fragment was found, fragment I. The comet experienced an outburst on 3 March 2021, during which it brightened by 2.8 magnitudes.

== Orbit and meteor showers ==
The orbit of the comet is currently stable, lying at a 9:4 orbital resonance with Jupiter. Meteor streams from the comet intersected with the orbit of Earth during the 18th and 19th century but currently no meteor showers associated with the comet are predicted. On 13 December 2036 the comet will pass 0.127 AU (19.0 million km) from Earth. An even closer approach is calculated to have taken place on 25 December 1978, when the comet passed about 0.11 AU (16 million km) from Earth.

== See also ==
- 73P/Schwassmann–Wachmann
- 332P/Ikeya–Murakami

Numbered comets
Previous; 140P/Bowell–Skiff	141P/Machholz	Next; 142P/Ge–Wang
