= 96P/Machholz =

Sungrazing comet

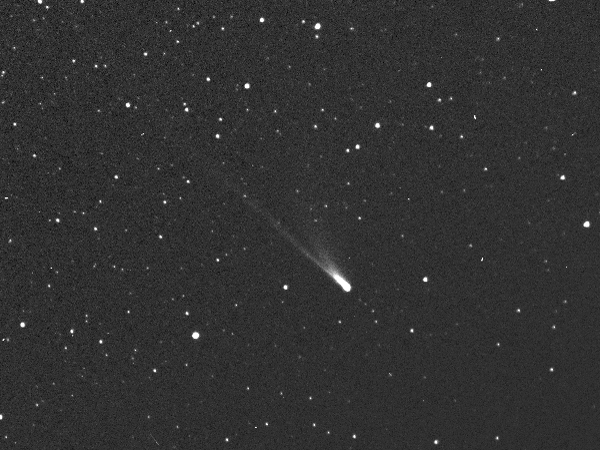
- Comet Machholz 1 as seen by the STEREO-A spacecraft in April 2007

Discovery
- Discovered by: Donald E. Machholz
- Discovery site: Loma Prieta, California
- Discovery date: 12 May 1986

Designations
- MPC designation: P/1986 J2
- Alternative designations: Machholz 1; 1986 VII, 1991 XII, 1986e

Orbital characteristics
- Epoch: 21 November 2025 (JD 2461000.5)
- Observation arc: 38.17 years
- Number of observations: 1,559
- Aphelion: 5.946 AU
- Perihelion: 0.116 AU (25 R_{☉}) (Note: Sunskirters are comets passing perihelion between 3.45 to 33 solar radii from Sun's centre.)
- Semi-major axis: 3.031 AU
- Eccentricity: 0.96173
- Orbital period: 5.277 years
- Max. orbital speed: 122 km/s (440,000 km/h)
- Inclination: 57.586°
- Longitude of ascending node: 93.963°
- Argument of periapsis: 14.739°
- Mean anomaly: 191.35°
- Last perihelion: 31 January 2023
- Next perihelion: 12 May 2028
- T_{Jupiter}: 1.942
- Earth MOID: 0.333 AU
- Jupiter MOID: 0.613 AU

Physical characteristics
- Mean radius: 3.2 km (2.0 mi)
- Comet total magnitude (M1): 13.7
- Comet nuclear magnitude (M2): 16.9

Comet 96P/Machholz, also known as Machholz 1, is a periodic sunskirting comet discovered on 12 May 1986, by amateur astronomer Donald Machholz on Loma Prieta peak, in central California using 130 mm (5.1 in) binoculars. On 6 June 1986, 96P/Machholz passed 0.404 AU (60.4 million km; 37.6 million mi) from the Earth. 96P/Machholz last came to perihelion on January 31, 2023. The comet has an estimated diameter of around 6.4 km (4.0 mi).

This comet is the parent body of both the Kracht and Marsden sungrazer families.

96P/Machholz is unusual among comets in several aspects. Other than small SOHO comets, its highly eccentric 5.29 year orbit has the smallest perihelion distance known among numbered/regular short-period comets, bringing it considerably closer to the Sun than the orbit of Mercury. It is also the only known short-period comet with both high orbital inclination and high eccentricity. In 2007, 96P/Machholz was found to be both carbon-depleted and cyanogen-depleted, a chemical composition nearly unique among comets with known compositions. The chemical composition implies a different and possible extrasolar origin.

== Orbit ==
The orbit of 96P/Machholz corresponds to the Arietids and the Marsden and Kracht comet groups. Its Tisserand parameter with respect to Jupiter, T_{J}, is 1.94 and comets are generally classified as Jupiter family if T_{J} > 2. Orbital integrations indicate that T_{J} was greater than 2 about 2500 years ago. 96P/Machholz is currently in a 9:4 orbital resonance with Jupiter. It will not make another close approach to the Earth until 2028, when it will pass at a distance of 0.3197 AU (47.83 million km; 29.72 million mi). It may eventually be ejected from the Solar System.

96P/Machholz closest Earth approach around 2139-Jun-13
Date & time of closest approach	Earth distance (AU)	Sun distance (AU)	Velocity wrt Earth (km/s)	Velocity wrt Sun (km/s)	Uncertainty region (3-sigma)	Reference
2139-Jun-13 23:28 ± 13 hours	0.179 AU (26.8 million km; 16.6 million mi; 70 LD)	1.06 AU (159 million km; 99 million mi; 410 LD)	41.4	37.1	± 500 thousand km	Horizons

=== Perihelion ===
Perihelion distance at different epochs
Epoch	Perihelion (AU)
1897	0.169
1928	0.152
1939	0.145
1975	0.133
1986	0.127
2023	0.116
2038	0.109
2081	0.095
2102	0.093

96P/Machholz has a perihelion (closest approach to the Sun) of 0.116 AU (17.4 million km) for 2028. At perihelion Comet Machholz passes the Sun at 122 km/s (440,000 km/h). It comes closer to the Sun than any numbered comet less than 321P/SOHO. Between 1897 and 2102 perihelion gradually drops from 0.17 AU (25 million km) to 0.09 AU (13 million km). 2081 will be the first perihelion below 0.1 AU.

== Observations ==
Machholz 1 entered the field of view of the orbiting Solar and Heliospheric Observatory (SOHO) in 1996, 2002, 2007, 2012, and 2017, where it was seen by the corona-observing LASCO instrument in its C2 and C3 coronagraphs.

=== 2001/02 perihelion ===
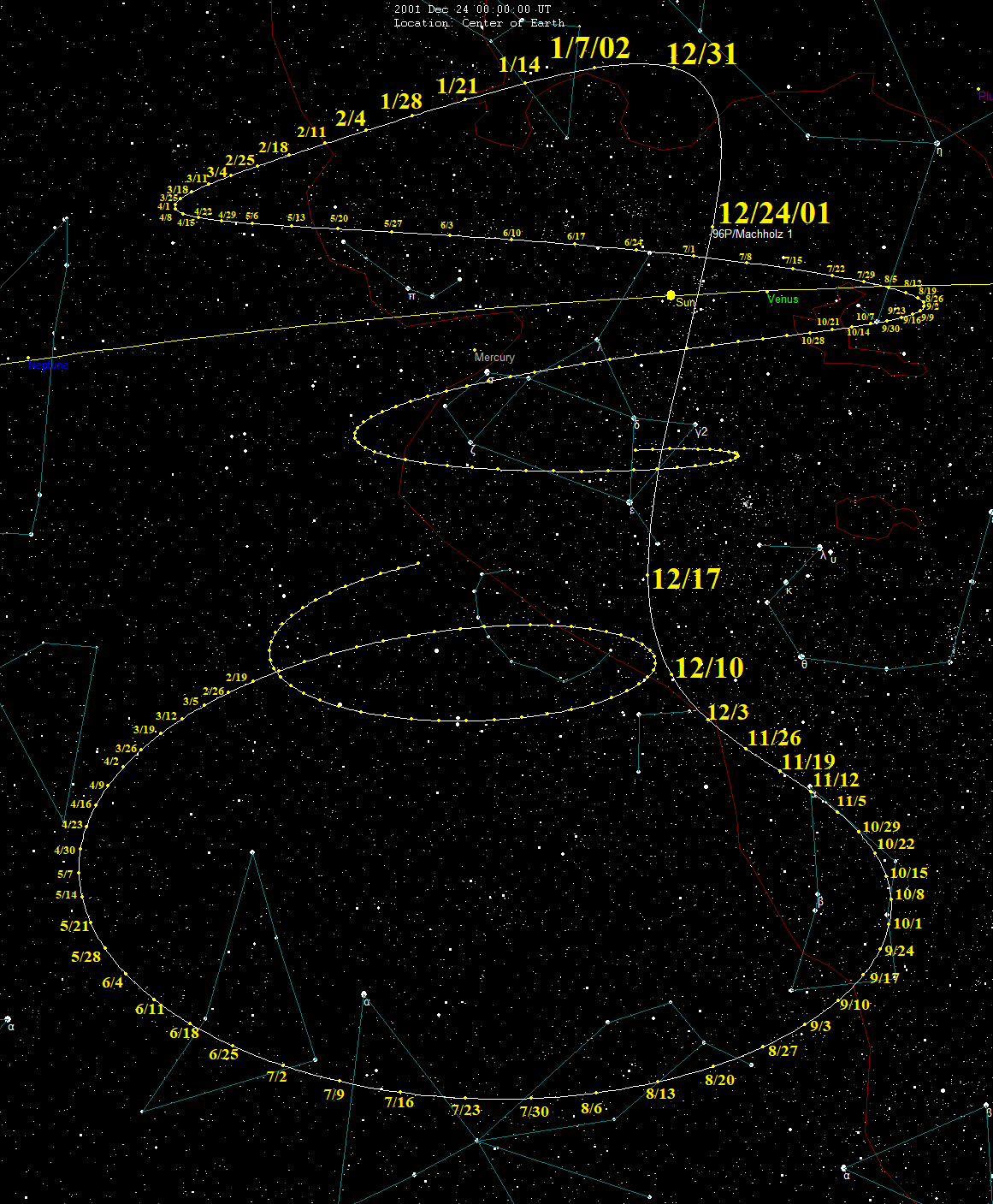
2001/2002 perihelion starmap

During the 2001/2002 passage the comet brightened to magnitude −2, and was very impressive as seen by SOHO.

=== 2007 perihelion ===
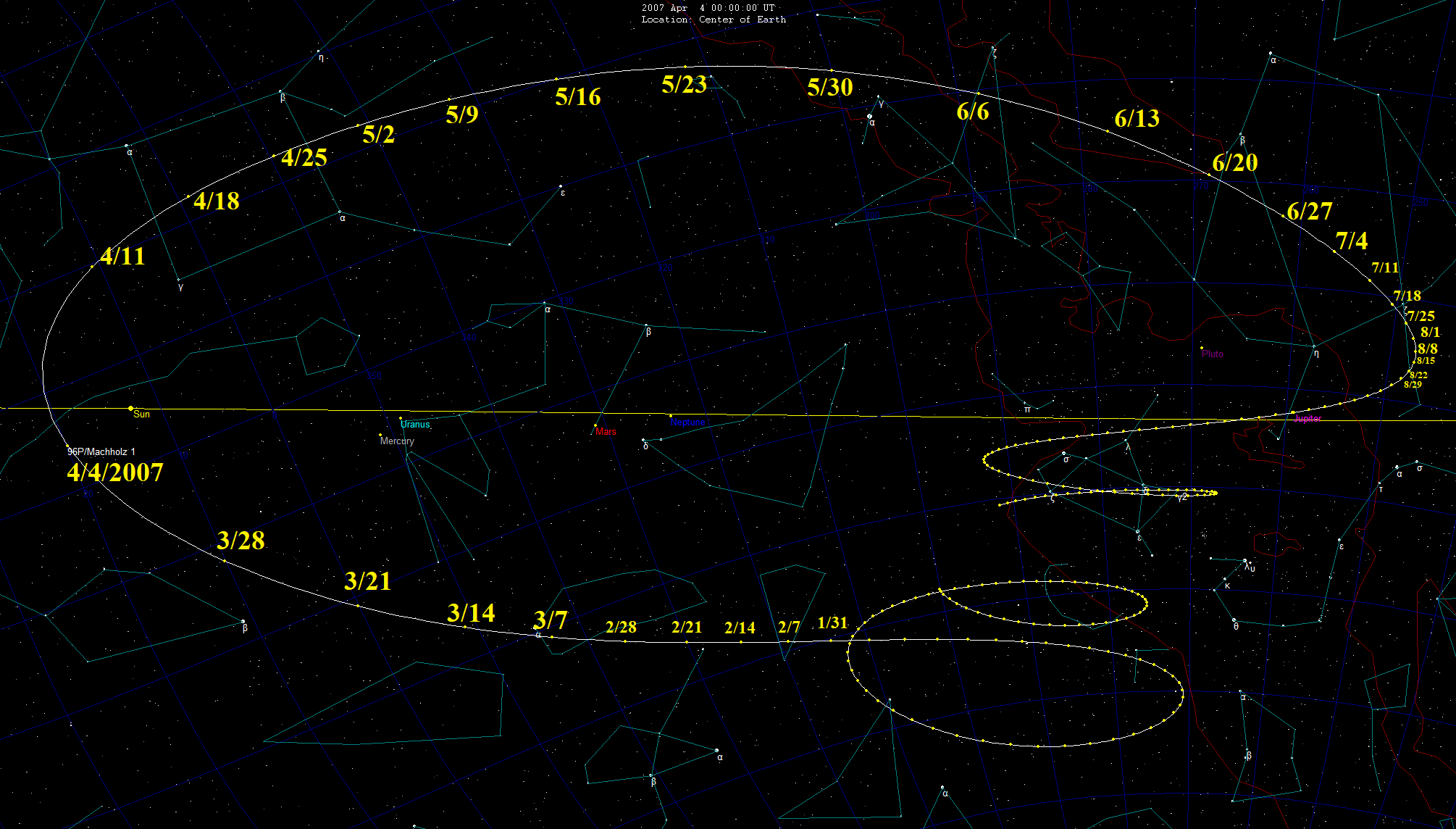
Starmap of 2007 perihelion

In 2007, it appeared in SOHO's LASCO C3's field of view from April 2 to 6, peaking in brightness on April 4, 2007, around magnitude +2. In these observations, its coma was substantially smaller than the Sun in volume, but the forward scattering of light made the comet appear significantly brighter.

The comet SOHO 2333 is believed to be a fragment of Machholz that came off during the 2007 perihelion. It was discovered by Indian amateur astronomer Prafull Sharma in August 2012 by analyzing data from the Solar and Heliospheric Observatory, specifically the Large Angle and Spectrometric Coronagraph. Data analysis of this sort has become commonplace based on public availability of SOHO images. Sharma became the third Indian to have discovered a comet in this manner.

=== 2012 perihelion ===
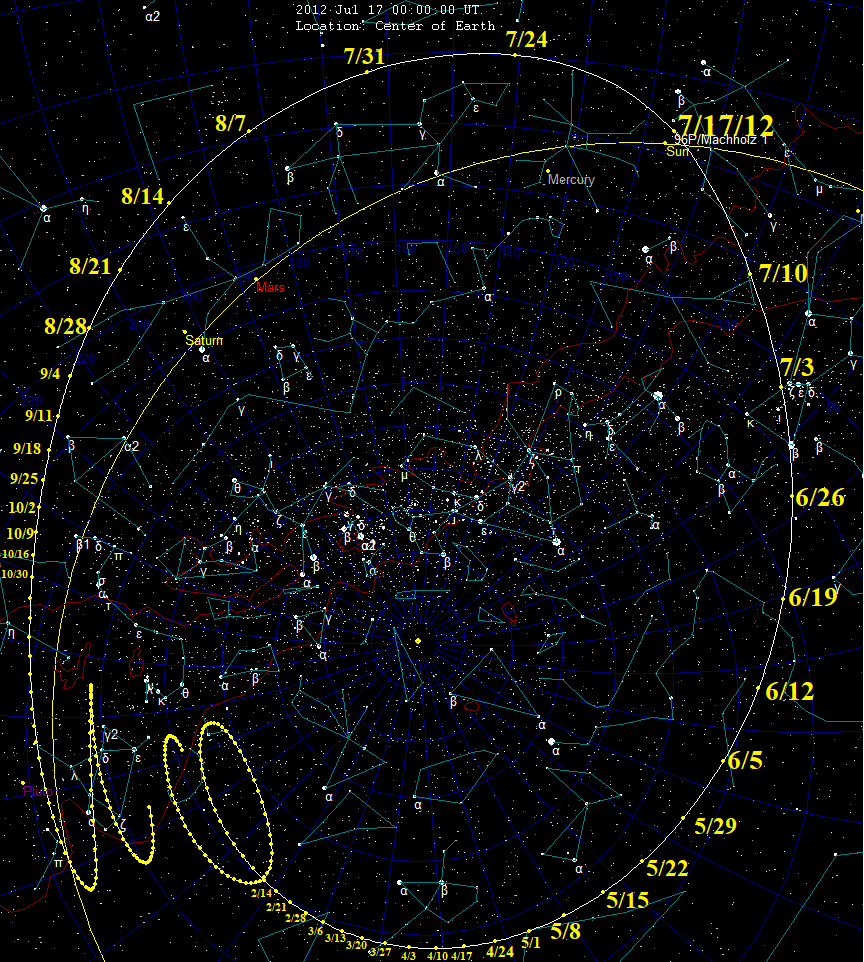
Starmap of 2012 perihelion

Between July 12–17, 2012, 96P/Machholz was visible in the SOHO LASCO/C3 field of view and expected to brighten to about magnitude +2. Two small faint fragments of 96P/Machholz were detected in the SOHO C2 images. The fragments were five hours ahead of 96P/Machholz, and probably fragmented from the comet during the 2007 perihelion passage.

=== 2017 perihelion ===
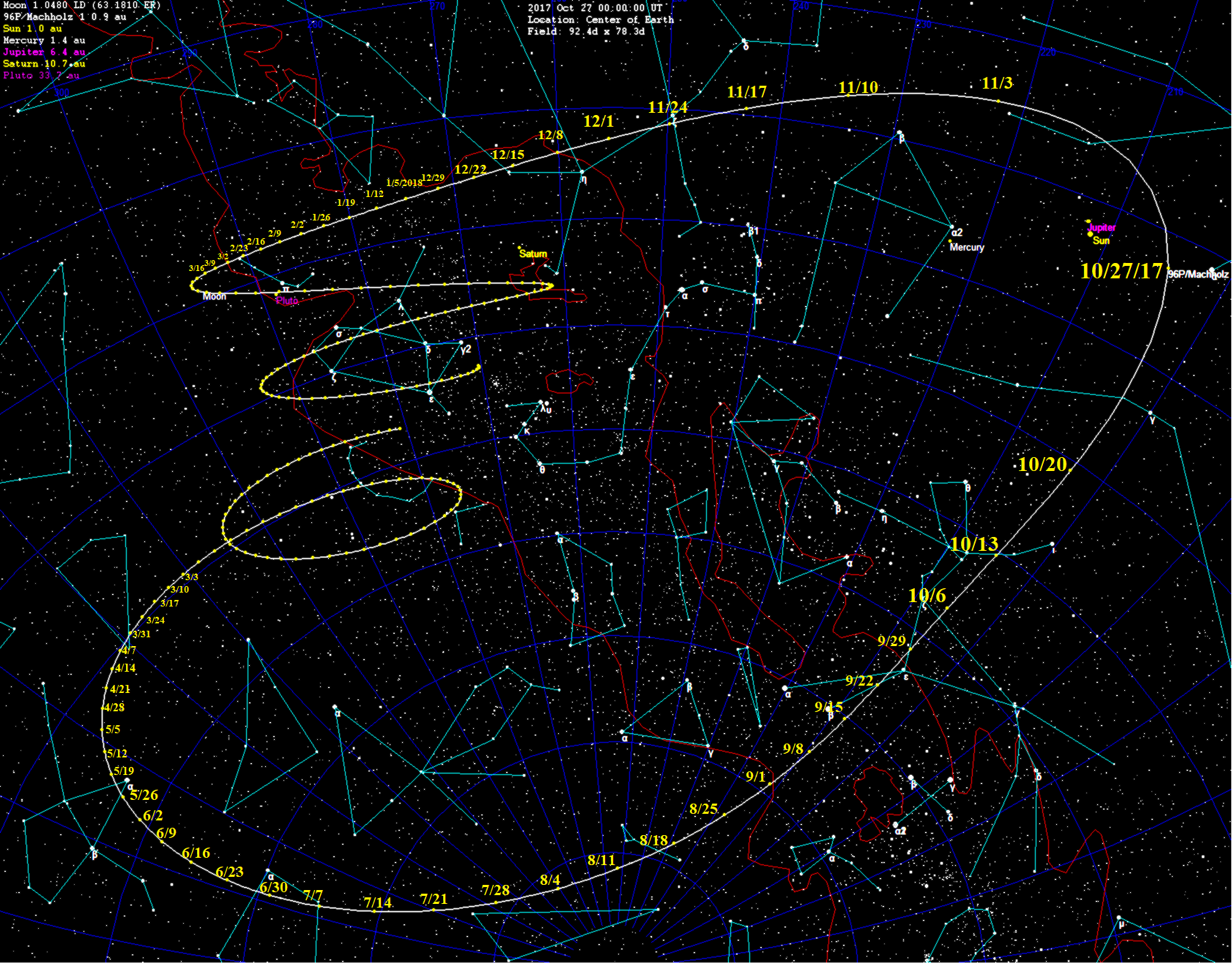
Starmap for 2017 perihelion

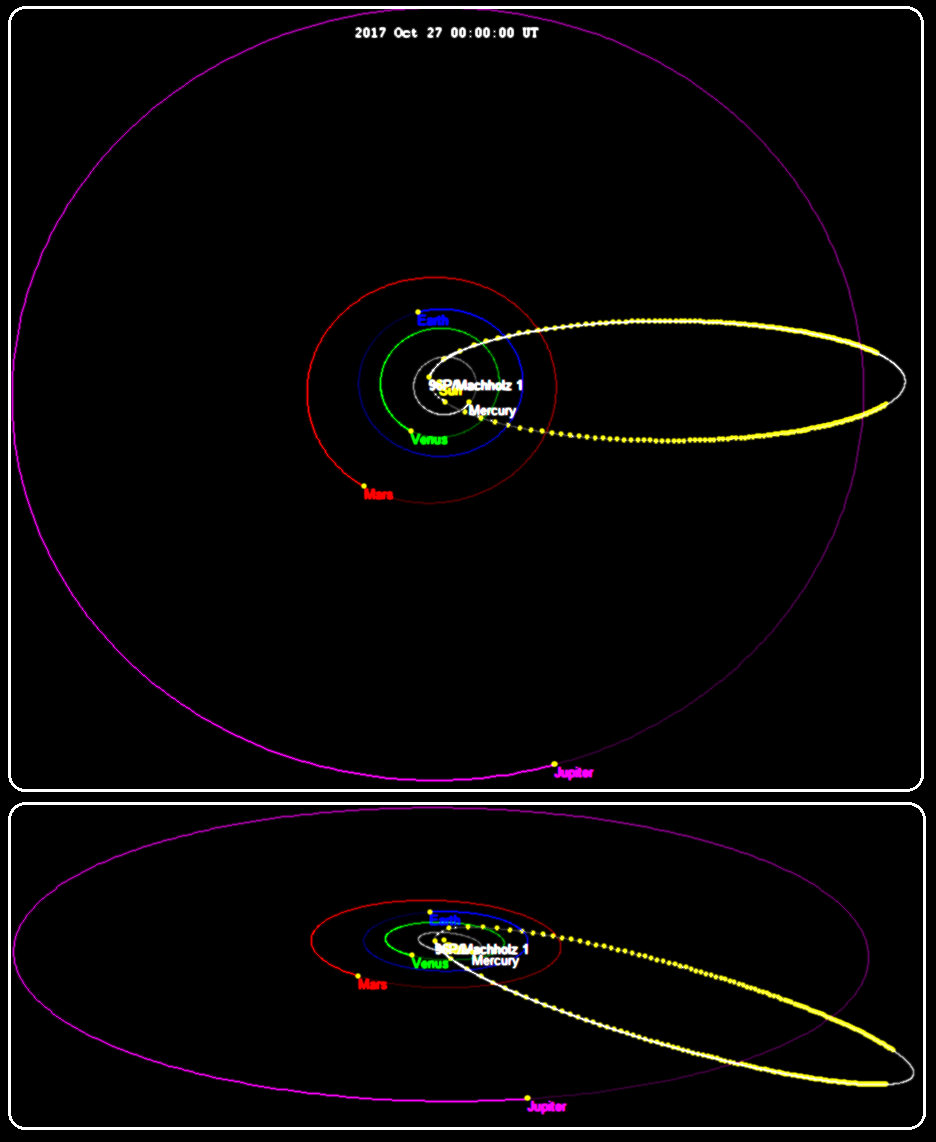
The orbit of Machholz 1 passes just outside Jupiter and inside the orbit of Mercury.

The 2017 perihelion was on October 27, 2017. At closest approach, it passed 0.12395 AU (18,543,000 km; 11,522,000 mi) from the Sun. Coronagraphs on SOHO were monitoring the flyby for a fifth time. Its peak brightness was expected to be about 2.0, when it was closest to the Sun.

=== 2023 perihelion ===
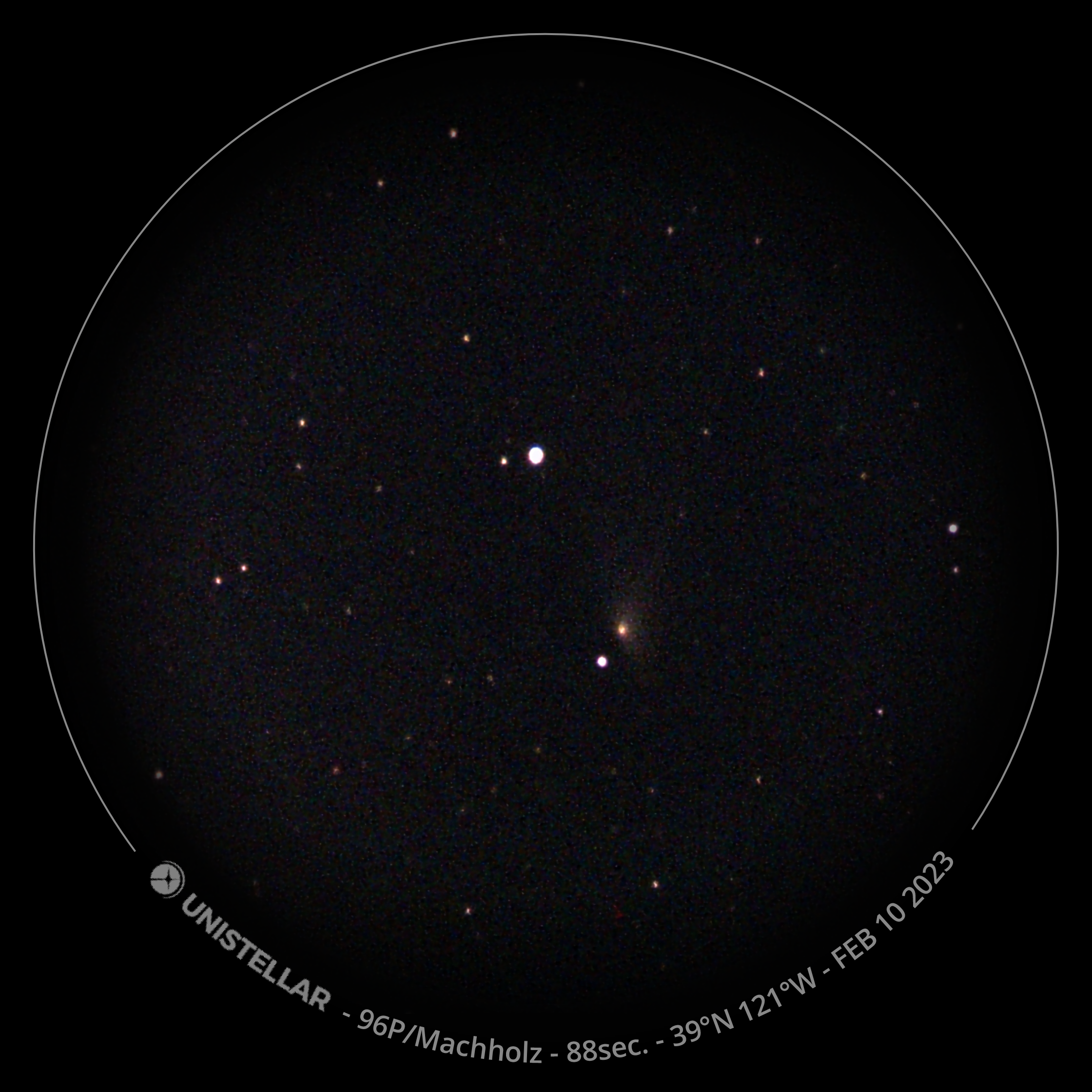
96P/Machholz 79 minutes before sunrise on 10 Feb 2023 (lower right of center)

The January 31, 2023 perihelion passage was the sixth passage observed by SOHO. On February 4, 2023, the comet was recovered in the morning sky 2 degrees above the horizon at around magnitude 7.

Using observations through October 2022, which is three months before the 2023 perihelion passage, the comet will next come to perihelion around 12 May 2028.

== Unusual composition ==
Spectrographic analysis of the coma of 96P/Machholz was made during its 2007 apparition, as part of the Lowell Observatory comet composition long-term observing program. When compared with the measured abundances of five molecular species in the comae of the other 150 comets in their database, these measurements showed 96P/Machholz to have far fewer carbon molecules. These other comets had on average 72 times as much cyanogen as 96P/Machholz.

The only two comets previously seen with similar depletion both in carbon-chain molecules and cyanogens were C/1988 Y1 (Yanaka) and C/2025 K1 (ATLAS), but they both have substantially different orbits.

There are currently three hypotheses to explain the chemical composition of 96P/Machholz. One hypothesis for the difference is that 96P/Machholz was an interstellar comet from outside the Solar System and was captured by the Sun. Other possibilities are that it formed in an extremely cold region of the Solar System (such that most carbon gets trapped in other molecules). Given how close it approaches the Sun at perihelion, repeated baking by the Sun may have stripped most of its cyanogen.

Animation of 96P/Machholz around Sun - 1600–2400 96P/Machholz · Earth · Sun

The following table represents future orbital elements for 96P keeping in mind that results hundreds of years in the future are highly speculative given the uncertain behavior of nongravitational forces over long time intervals and divergent solutions. By the year 2235, the uncertainty in the comets position is more than 1 billion km (6.7 AU).

Osculating elements as of January 1
Year	1600	1700	1800	1900	2000	2100	2200	2300	2400	2500
Periapsis (au)	0.34	0.27	0.23	0.17	0.12	0.09	0.07	0.04	0.03	0.03
Apoapsis (au)	5.73	5.77	5.85	5.88	5.90	5.97	6.01	6.01	6.01	6.02
Inclination (degrees)	70.87	69.65	66.35	63.62	60.11	53.20	44.00	32.36	15.08	16.82
Eccentricity	0.89	0.91	0.93	0.94	0.96	0.97	0.98	0.99	0.99	0.99

== Notes ==
Numbered comets
Previous; 95P/Chiron	96P/Machholz	Next; 97P/Metcalf–Brewington
