= List of stars in Auriga =

This is the list of notable stars in the constellation Auriga, sorted by decreasing brightness.

Name	B	F	Var	HD	HIP	RA	Dec	vis. mag.	abs. mag.	Dist. (ly)	Sp. class	Notes
Capella	α	13		34029	24608	05^{h} 16^{m} 41.30^{s}	+45° 59′ 56.5″	0.08	−0.48	42	G8III / G0III	Alhajoth, Alhaior, Althaiot, Alhaiset, Alhatod, Alhojet, Alanac, Alanat, Alioc; quadruple star, spectroscopic binary; 11th and 14th brightest stars
β Aur	β	34		40183	28360	05^{h} 59^{m} 31.77^{s}	+44° 56′ 50.8″	1.90	−0.10	82	A2V	Menkalinan, Menkalina; eclipsing spectroscopic binary; Algol variable, V_{max} = 1.89^{m}, V_{min} = 1.98^{m}, P = 3.96004 d
θ Aur	θ	37		40312	28380	05^{h} 59^{m} 43.24^{s}	+37° 12′ 46.0″	2.62	−0.98	173	A0p Si	Mahasim, Maha-Sim, Manus; α² CVn variable, V_{max} = 2.62^{m}, V_{min} = 2.70^{m}, P = 3.6186 d
ι Aur	ι	3		31398	23015	04^{h} 56^{m} 59.62^{s}	+33° 09′ 58.1″	2.69	−3.29	512	K3IIvar	Kabdhilinan, Hassaleh
ε Aur	ε	7		31964	23416	05^{h} 01^{m} 58.13^{s}	+43° 49′ 23.9″	3.03	−5.95	2037	F0Ia	Almaaz, Maaz, Al Maz, Al Anz; long period eclipsing binary; Algol variable, V_{max} = 2.92^{m}, V_{min} = 3.88^{m}, P = 9884 d
η Aur	η	10		32630	23767	05^{h} 06^{m} 30.87^{s}	+41° 14′ 04.7″	3.18	−0.96	219	B3V	Haedus II, Hoedus II, Haedus, Maha-Sim
ζ Aur	ζ	8		32068	23453	05^{h} 02^{m} 28.68^{s}	+41° 04′ 33.2″	3.69	−3.22	787	K4II comp	Sadatoni, Saclateni, Haedus I, Hoedus I; eclipsing binary; Algol variable, ΔV = 0.27^{m}, P = 972.151 d
δ Aur	δ	33		40035	28358	05^{h} 59^{m} 31.55^{s}	+54° 17′ 05.9″	3.72	0.55	140	K0III	Bagu, Prajapati, Praja
ν Aur	ν	32		39003	27673	05^{h} 51^{m} 29.39^{s}	+39° 08′ 54.5″	3.97	−0.13	215	K0III	
π Aur	π	35		40239	28404	05^{h} 59^{m} 56.10^{s}	+45° 56′ 12.3″	4.30	−2.76	840	M3IIvar	
κ Aur	κ	44		43039	29696	06^{h} 15^{m} 22.74^{s}	+29° 29′ 55.4″	4.32	0.75	169	G8IIIvar	
τ Aur	τ	29		38656	27483	05^{h} 49^{m} 10.46^{s}	+39° 10′ 52.1″	4.51	0.44	213	G8III	
16 Aur		16		34334	24727	05^{h} 18^{m} 10.55^{s}	+33° 22′ 19.2″	4.54	0.26	234	K3III...	
λ Aur	λ	15		34411	24813	05^{h} 19^{m} 08.08^{s}	+40° 06′ 02.4″	4.69	4.18	41	G0V	Al Hurr, Al Hiba I
χ Aur	χ	25		36371	25984	05^{h} 32^{m} 43.67^{s}	+32° 11′ 31.3″	4.71	−5.77	4075	B5Iab	
υ Aur	υ	31		38944	27639	05^{h} 51^{m} 02.41^{s}	+37° 18′ 20.5″	4.72	−1.10	475	M1III	
2 Aur		2		30834	22678	04^{h} 52^{m} 38.00^{s}	+36° 42′ 11.5″	4.79	−1.39	561	K3III	
ψ^{2} Aur	ψ^{2}	50		47174	31832	06^{h} 39^{m} 19.83^{s}	+42° 29′ 20.4″	4.80	−0.81	432	K3III	part of Dolones (ψ Aur)
μ Aur	μ	11		33641	24340	05^{h} 13^{m} 25.73^{s}	+38° 29′ 04.8″	4.82	1.33	162	A4m	Al Hiba II
63 Aur		63		54716	34752	07^{h} 11^{m} 39.29^{s}	+39° 19′ 14.0″	4.91	−0.86	464	K4II-III	
ψ^{1} Aur	ψ^{1}	46		44537	30520	06^{h} 24^{m} 53.90^{s}	+49° 17′ 16.4″	4.92	−5.43	3835	K5Iabvar	part of Dolones (ψ Aur)
ω Aur	ω	4		31647	23179	04^{h} 59^{m} 15.38^{s}	+37° 53′ 25.7″	4.93	1.49	159	A1V	Binary, associated to EUVE J0459+37.8 is UV-emission source
ξ Aur	ξ	30		39283	27949	05^{h} 54^{m} 50.79^{s}	+55° 42′ 24.9″	4.96	0.62	241	A2V	
9 Aur		9	V398	32537	23783	05^{h} 06^{m} 40.66^{s}	+51° 35′ 53.3″	4.98	2.89	85	F0V	V398 Aurigae, Gamma Doradus variable, V_{max} = 4.93^{m}, V_{min} = 5.03^{m}, P = 1.25804 d
ψ^{7} Aur	ψ^{7}	58		49520	32844	06^{h} 50^{m} 45.96^{s}	+41° 46′ 53.6″	4.99	−0.25	364	K3III	part of Dolones (ψ Aur)
KW Aur		14		33959	24504	05^{h} 15^{m} 24.41^{s}	+32° 41′ 15.3″	5.01	0.43	269	A9IV	δ Sct variable, V_{max} = 4.95^{m}, V_{min} = 5.08^{m}, P = 0.088088 d; multiple star system
σ Aur	σ	21		35186	25292	05^{h} 24^{m} 39.14^{s}	+37° 23′ 07.4″	5.02	−0.97	513	K4III	Al Hiba III
ψ^{4} Aur	ψ^{4}	55		47914	32173	06^{h} 43^{m} 05.01^{s}	+44° 31′ 28.3″	5.04	0.18	306	K5III	part of Dolones (ψ Aur)
19 Aur		19		34578	24879	05^{h} 20^{m} 00.92^{s}	+33° 57′ 29.0″	5.05	−4.82	3075	A5IIvar	
φ Aur	φ	24		35620	25541	05^{h} 27^{m} 38.89^{s}	+34° 28′ 33.6″	5.08	−0.37	400	K4IIIp	
65 Aur		65		57264	35710	07^{h} 22^{m} 02.69^{s}	+36° 45′ 38.3″	5.12	0.84	235	K0III	
ρ Aur	ρ	20		34759	25048	05^{h} 21^{m} 48.41^{s}	+41° 48′ 16.8″	5.22	−1.25	642	B5V	
ψ^{6} Aur	ψ^{6}	57		48781	32562	06^{h} 47^{m} 39.58^{s}	+48° 47′ 22.1″	5.22	−0.35	424	K1III	part of Dolones (ψ Aur)
66 Aur		66		57669	35907	07^{h} 24^{m} 08.47^{s}	+40° 40′ 20.8″	5.23	−1.51	728	K0III	
ψ^{5} Aur	ψ^{5}	56		48682	32480	06^{h} 46^{m} 44.34^{s}	+43° 34′ 37.3″	5.24	4.15	54	G0V	part of Dolones (ψ Aur)
49 Aur		49		46553	31434	06^{h} 35^{m} 12.06^{s}	+28° 01′ 20.4″	5.26	−0.42	447	A0Vnn	
45 Aur		45		43905	30247	06^{h} 21^{m} 46.11^{s}	+53° 27′ 08.6″	5.34	1.56	186	F5III...	
ψ^{3} Aur	ψ^{3}	52		47100	31789	06^{h} 38^{m} 49.19^{s}	+39° 54′ 09.3″	5.34	−1.49	758	B8III	part of Dolones (ψ Aur)
40 Aur		40		41357	28946	06^{h} 06^{m} 35.09^{s}	+38° 28′ 58.0″	5.36	0.01	380	A4m	
IQ Aur			IQ	34452	24799	05^{h} 19^{m} 00.02^{s}	+33° 44′ 54.5″	5.38	−0.31	448	A0p...	α² CVn variable, V_{max} = 5.35^{m}, V_{min} = 5.43^{m}, P = 2.466 d
26 Aur		26		37269	26536	05^{h} 38^{m} 38.10^{s}	+30° 29′ 32.8″	5.40	−0.29	447	A2V + GIII	
UU Aur			UU	46687	31579	06^{h} 36^{m} 32.84^{s}	+38° 26′ 44.0″	5.40	−3.32	1811	C5II	semiregular variable, V_{max} = 4.9^{m}, V_{min} = 7.0^{m}, P = 441 d
				34557	24902	05^{h} 20^{m} 14.68^{s}	+41° 05′ 10.8″	5.46	0.60	306	A3V	
ο Aur	ο	27		38104	27196	05^{h} 45^{m} 54.05^{s}	+49° 49′ 34.6″	5.46	−0.39	482	A0p...	
				34904	25143	05^{h} 22^{m} 50.32^{s}	+41° 01′ 45.3″	5.54	0.72	300	A3V	
PU Aur			PU	34269	24738	05^{h} 18^{m} 15.68^{s}	+42° 47′ 31.9″	5.55	−1.09	694	M4III	irregular variable, V_{max} = 5.55^{m}, V_{min} = 5.78^{m}
				30454	22393	04^{h} 49^{m} 12.84^{s}	+31° 26′ 15.4″	5.57	1.29	235	K2III	
				30557	22545	04^{h} 51^{m} 09.36^{s}	+48° 44′ 26.7″	5.64	0.67	321	G9III	
HD 34790				34790	25001	05^{h} 21^{m} 12.69^{s}	+29° 34′ 11.6″	5.66	1.00	278	A1Vs	
				33167	24109	05^{h} 10^{m} 42.87^{s}	+46° 57′ 44.8″	5.67	2.35	151	F5V	
				30823	22699	04^{h} 52^{m} 47.77^{s}	+42° 35′ 11.9″	5.68	−0.32	517	A3III	
				35600	25492	05^{h} 27^{m} 08.27^{s}	+30° 12′ 31.0″	5.69	−3.56	2312	B9Ib	
51 Aur		51		47070	31771	06^{h} 38^{m} 39.55^{s}	+39° 23′ 28.0″	5.70	0.76	317	K5III	
36 Aur		36	V444	40394	28499	06^{h} 00^{m} 58.56^{s}	+47° 54′ 07.1″	5.71	−1.77	1022	B9.5p SiFe	V444 Aur; α² CVn variable, V_{max} = 5.70^{m}, V_{min} = 5.74^{m}, P = 14.368 d
				36678	26344	05^{h} 36^{m} 35.22^{s}	+54° 25′ 43.3″	5.74	−1.06	746	M0III	
RT Aur		48	RT	45412	30827	06^{h} 28^{m} 34.09^{s}	+30° 29′ 35.1″	5.75	−2.65	1560	F5.5Ibv	Cepheid variable, V_{max} = 5.00^{m}, V_{min} = 5.82^{m}, P = 3.72849 d
53 Aur		53		47152	31737	06^{h} 38^{m} 23.02^{s}	+28° 59′ 03.8″	5.76	0.20	421	B9npe...	
41 Aur A		41		42126	29388	06^{h} 11^{m} 36.58^{s}	+48° 42′ 40.0″	5.78	0.88	311	A3V+...	binary star
				42471	29451	06^{h} 12^{m} 20.13^{s}	+32° 41′ 36.2″	5.78	−2.40	1411	M1III	
WW Aur			WW	46052	31173	06^{h} 32^{m} 27.20^{s}	+32° 27′ 17.8″	5.82	1.19	275	A3m + A3m	Algol variable, ΔV = 0.68^{m}, P = 2.52502 d
HD 30453				30453	22407	04^{h} 49^{m} 19.06^{s}	+32° 35′ 17.8″	5.84	0.78	336	A8m	
ψ^{9} Aur	ψ^{9}			50658	33377	06^{h} 56^{m} 32.06^{s}	+46° 16′ 26.4″	5.85	−1.17	825	B8III	part of Dolones (ψ Aur)
64 Aur		64		56221	35341	07^{h} 18^{m} 02.22^{s}	+40° 53′ 00.1″	5.87	1.30	268	A5Vn	
47 Aur		47		45466	30972	06^{h} 30^{m} 02.98^{s}	+46° 41′ 07.9″	5.88	−0.18	530	K4III	
				50763	33415	06^{h} 56^{m} 56.13^{s}	+46° 42′ 19.9″	5.88	0.83	334	K0III:	
				39586	27973	05^{h} 54^{m} 59.02^{s}	+31° 42′ 07.0″	5.90	1.42	256	A5IV	
				40084	28343	05^{h} 59^{m} 21.78^{s}	+49° 55′ 28.4″	5.90	−1.79	1124	G5III	
39 Aur		39		41074	28823	06^{h} 05^{m} 03.42^{s}	+42° 58′ 55.1″	5.90	2.34	168	F3V	
				35520	25471	05^{h} 26^{m} 48.80^{s}	+34° 23′ 30.6″	5.92	−2.06	1289	A1p	
				35239	25291	05^{h} 24^{m} 38.53^{s}	+31° 08′ 35.4″	5.94	−1.07	821	B9III	
5 Aur		5		31761	23261	05^{h} 00^{m} 18.35^{s}	+39° 23′ 40.9″	5.95	2.33	173	F5V	
V433 Aur			V433	37367	26606	05^{h} 39^{m} 18.31^{s}	+29° 12′ 54.8″	5.98	−1.81	1177	B2IV-V	long-period pulsating variable, ΔV = 0.04^{m}, P = 4.6382 d
				40486	28562	06^{h} 01^{m} 43.05^{s}	+48° 57′ 34.1″	5.98	−0.64	686	K0	
AE Aur			AE	34078	24575	05^{h} 16^{m} 18.15^{s}	+34° 18′ 44.0″	5.99	−2.26	1455	O9.5Vvar	Schaeberle's Flaming Star; runaway star; Orion variable, V_{max} = 5.78^{m}, V_{min} = 6.08^{m}
				36040	25816	05^{h} 30^{m} 48.65^{s}	+41° 27′ 43.5″	5.99	0.62	386	K0IIIp	
V394 Aur			V394	41429	28930	06^{h} 06^{m} 22.44^{s}	+29° 30′ 44.7″	6.01	−1.18	893	M3II comp	semiregular variable, V_{max} = 6.01^{m}, V_{min} = 6.11^{m}, P = 32.896 d
				33203	24072	05^{h} 10^{m} 18.81^{s}	+37° 18′ 06.7″	6.02	−2.97	2050	B2II: comp	
54 Aur		54		47395	31852	06^{h} 39^{m} 33.12^{s}	+28° 15′ 47.4″	6.02	−0.67	709	B7III	
62 Aur		62		51440	33614	06^{h} 59^{m} 02.88^{s}	+38° 03′ 09.4″	6.02	−0.31	603	K2III	
				50056	33044	06^{h} 53^{m} 03.54^{s}	+35° 47′ 16.8″	6.03	−0.62	698	K3III:	
HIP 26712				37519	26712	05^{h} 40^{m} 35.91^{s}	+31° 21′ 29.6″	6.04	0.10	502	B9.5III-IVp	Andrew's Star
				39225	27778	05^{h} 52^{m} 40.08^{s}	+33° 55′ 02.8″	6.04	−0.75	744	M2II:	
				40626	28637	06^{h} 02^{m} 48.59^{s}	+49° 54′ 20.8″	6.04	0.54	410	B9.5IV	
				31069	22842	04^{h} 54^{m} 51.22^{s}	+44° 03′ 39.6″	6.06	0.97	340	A0V	
				42466	29569	06^{h} 13^{m} 45.34^{s}	+51° 10′ 21.4″	6.07	0.61	403	K1III	
				36891	26363	05^{h} 36^{m} 52.42^{s}	+40° 10′ 56.6″	6.08	−3.38	2547	G3Ib	
38 Aur		38		40801	28677	06^{h} 03^{m} 17.87^{s}	+42° 54′ 42.8″	6.08	1.56	261	K0III	
41 Aur B		41		42127		06^{h} 11^{m} 36.60^{s}	+48° 42′ 40.0″	6.09				component of the 41 Aur system
				31327	22955	04^{h} 56^{m} 20.09^{s}	+36° 10′ 06.8″	6.10	−6.66	11643	B2Ib	
				36719	26315	05^{h} 36^{m} 15.95^{s}	+47° 42′ 55.2″	6.10	1.05	333	F0V:	
59 Aur		59	OX	50018	33041	06^{h} 53^{m} 01.41^{s}	+38° 52′ 08.9″	6.10	0.04	530	F2V	OX Aur; δ Sct variable, V_{max} = 5.94^{m}, V_{min} = 6.14^{m}, P = 0.154412 d
				32188	23511	05^{h} 03^{m} 18.64^{s}	+41° 26′ 30.0″	6.11	−2.87	2037	A2sh	
				41330	28908	06^{h} 06^{m} 08.62^{s}	+35° 23′ 18.4″	6.12	4.01	86	G0V	
				32406	23583	05^{h} 04^{m} 14.56^{s}	+30° 29′ 40.6″	6.14	−0.12	581	K0II-III	
				40083	28390	05^{h} 59^{m} 47.95^{s}	+54° 32′ 49.6″	6.14	1.04	341	K2III	
AR Aur		17	AR	34364	24740	05^{h} 18^{m} 18.89^{s}	+33° 46′ 02.7″	6.15	0.72	398	B9.5V	Algol variable, V_{max} = 6.15^{m}, V_{min} = 6.82^{m}, P = 4.13465 d
				41467	29025	06^{h} 07^{m} 26.76^{s}	+41° 51′ 15.6″	6.15	−0.89	834	K0III	
				33654	24451	05^{h} 14^{m} 44.27^{s}	+53° 12′ 50.2″	6.16	−2.45	1716	A0V	
V352 Aur			V352	50420	33269	06^{h} 55^{m} 14.66^{s}	+43° 54′ 36.2″	6.16	−0.97	869	A9III	δ Sct variable, V_{max} = 6.13^{m}, V_{min} = 6.18^{m}, P = 0.17 d
HD 35519				35519	25476	05^{h} 26^{m} 54.33^{s}	+35° 27′ 26.3″	6.17	−0.31	644	K2	Star in Cluster NGC 1912 and NGC 1907
				35521	25475	05^{h} 26^{m} 51.28^{s}	+33° 15′ 44.2″	6.18	1.06	344	K0	
				40588	28517	06^{h} 01^{m} 10.06^{s}	+31° 02′ 04.3″	6.18	1.70	256	A2V	
				53925	34462	07^{h} 08^{m} 36.25^{s}	+37° 26′ 42.5″	6.19	−0.45	695	K1III	
				32655	23799	05^{h} 06^{m} 49.56^{s}	+43° 10′ 29.0″	6.20	−0.91	860	F2IIp...	
				35984	25730	05^{h} 29^{m} 40.63^{s}	+29° 11′ 11.7″	6.20	1.45	290	F6III	
V538 Aur			V538	37394	26779	05^{h} 41^{m} 20.33^{s}	+53° 28′ 56.4″	6.21	5.77	40	K1V	BY Draconis variable, ΔV = 0.04^{m}, P = 10.86 d
				40325	28438	06^{h} 00^{m} 18.92^{s}	+44° 35′ 31.6″	6.21	0.97	365	K2III...	
				48073	32190	06^{h} 43^{m} 13.72^{s}	+37° 08′ 50.7″	6.21	0.38	478	K0	
				34332	24771	05^{h} 18^{m} 40.32^{s}	+40° 27′ 54.6″	6.22	−0.36	676	K0	
NO Aur			NO	37536	26718	05^{h} 40^{m} 42.05^{s}	+31° 55′ 14.2″	6.23	−1.89	1370	M2SIab	S star type; irregular variable, V_{max} = 6.06^{m}, V_{min} = 6.44^{m}
				40832	28644	06^{h} 02^{m} 55.12^{s}	+32° 38′ 10.4″	6.23	2.74	163	F4V	
				41269	28861	06^{h} 05^{m} 33.90^{s}	+33° 35′ 56.7″	6.23	−1.06	937	B9sp...	
				49949	33056	06^{h} 53^{m} 07.57^{s}	+44° 50′ 24.3″	6.24	1.03	359	A8Vn	
				36499	26071	05^{h} 33^{m} 38.23^{s}	+34° 43′ 32.2″	6.27	0.78	408	A3IV	
V440 Aur			V440	39045	27661	05^{h} 51^{m} 25.74^{s}	+32° 07′ 28.9″	6.28	0.03	580	M3III	irregular variable, V_{max} = 6.24^{m}, V_{min} = 6.37^{m}
				42083	29404	06^{h} 11^{m} 45.91^{s}	+52° 38′ 50.5″	6.28	1.27	327	A5m	
				38765	27625	05^{h} 50^{m} 56.22^{s}	+51° 30′ 52.9″	6.29	1.62	281	K1III	
				35238	25290	05^{h} 24^{m} 38.44^{s}	+31° 13′ 26.2″	6.30	−0.49	744	K1III...	
				38358	27319	05^{h} 47^{m} 14.68^{s}	+42° 31′ 37.1″	6.30	−0.42	720	K0	
				50384	33271	06^{h} 55^{m} 15.21^{s}	+45° 49′ 35.7″	6.31	0.96	383	K0III-IV	
				41162	28820	06^{h} 05^{m} 02.58^{s}	+37° 57′ 51.4″	6.32	−0.50	755	K0III+...	
60 Aur		60		50037	33064	06^{h} 53^{m} 13.37^{s}	+38° 26′ 18.4″	6.32	2.23	214	F5V:	
43 Aur		43		43380	29949	06^{h} 18^{m} 16.86^{s}	+46° 21′ 38.7″	6.33	1.20	346	K2III	
				56941	35623	07^{h} 21^{m} 03.11^{s}	+42° 39′ 21.6″	6.33	−0.63	805	K0	
				41636	29114	06^{h} 08^{m} 23.14^{s}	+41° 03′ 21.0″	6.34	0.99	384	G9III	
				39866	28117	05^{h} 56^{m} 33.77^{s}	+28° 56′ 32.2″	6.35	−3.88	3622	A2II	
				47270	31889	06^{h} 39^{m} 57.87^{s}	+44° 00′ 50.8″	6.35	−0.19	663	K1III	
				37138	26463	05^{h} 37^{m} 45.80^{s}	+33° 33′ 33.0″	6.36	0.44	498	K0	
				48272	32268	06^{h} 44^{m} 12.52^{s}	+36° 06′ 33.3″	6.37	−0.85	908	A2V	
HD 36041				36041	25810	05^{h} 30^{m} 45.07^{s}	+39° 49′ 33.6″	6.38	0.63	460	G9III	
				40722	28642	06^{h} 02^{m} 53.49^{s}	+43° 22′ 42.3″	6.38	0.88	410	K0	
35 Cam		(35)		40873	28765	06^{h} 04^{m} 29.11^{s}	+51° 34′ 24.6″	6.39	0.98	394	A7III	
				37646	26781	05^{h} 41^{m} 20.97^{s}	+29° 29′ 14.9″	6.40	0.46	502	B8IV	
				39182	27777	05^{h} 52^{m} 39.67^{s}	+39° 34′ 29.0″	6.40	−0.14	661	A2V	
				57263	35725	07^{h} 22^{m} 13.41^{s}	+38° 59′ 45.7″	6.40	0.33	533	K0	
				35681	25580	05^{h} 28^{m} 00.92^{s}	+33° 45′ 51.2″	6.41	3.76	110	F5	
				44092	30200	06^{h} 21^{m} 11.91^{s}	+29° 32′ 27.3″	6.41	1.33	338	A1Vs	
HD 33463				33463	24193	05^{h} 11^{m} 38.31^{s}	+29° 54′ 13.1″	6.42	−1.31	1144	M2III	
34 Cam		(34)		40062	28385	05^{h} 59^{m} 45.83^{s}	+55° 19′ 15.9″	6.42	1.32	342	A5m	
				45192	30741	06^{h} 27^{m} 35.52^{s}	+32° 33′ 47.2″	6.43	0.80	435	K0	
				37250	26592	05^{h} 39^{m} 08.72^{s}	+41° 21′ 31.9″	6.44	2.02	250	K0	
22 Aur		22		35076	25192	05^{h} 23^{m} 22.86^{s}	+28° 56′ 12.6″	6.45	0.15	593	B9Vs	
6 Aur		6		31780	23268	05^{h} 00^{m} 23.21^{s}	+39° 39′ 16.8″	6.46	−1.45	1244	K5III	
ψ^{8} Aur	ψ^{8}	61		50204	33133	06^{h} 53^{m} 57.07^{s}	+38° 30′ 18.3″	6.46	−0.56	825	B9.5sp...	part of Dolones (ψ Aur)
				38229	27293	05^{h} 47^{m} 00.06^{s}	+51° 31′ 15.5″	6.47	0.63	481	G5	
V403 Aur			V403	39743	28162	05^{h} 57^{m} 04.90^{s}	+49° 01′ 46″	6.47	0.21	583	G8III	RS CVn variable, ΔV = 0.19^{m}, P = 73.1 d
				33632	24332	05^{h} 13^{m} 17.55^{s}	+37° 20′ 15.5″	6.48	4.41	85	F8	
				47703	32040	06^{h} 41^{m} 37.77^{s}	+35° 55′ 55.2″	6.48	2.00	256	F8III	
				51021	33453	06^{h} 57^{m} 18.50^{s}	+37° 23′ 41.0″	6.48	−0.94	994	M3	
				56171	35317	07^{h} 17^{m} 42.65^{s}	+38° 52′ 34.8″	6.48	0.45	524	K0	
				29867	22003	04^{h} 43^{m} 48.27^{s}	+32° 51′ 56.0″	6.49	2.20	235	A8V	
				32608	23724	05^{h} 06^{m} 00.93^{s}	+35° 56′ 11.1″	6.49	1.91	269	A5V	
18 Aur		18		34499	24832	05^{h} 19^{m} 23.72^{s}	+33° 59′ 07.6″	6.49	2.20	235	A7V	
				34498	24881	05^{h} 20^{m} 02.32^{s}	+44° 25′ 31.5″	6.49	−0.83	948	K0	
				35202	25301	05^{h} 24^{m} 44.80^{s}	+36° 11′ 59.9″	6.49	−1.82	1495	K2	
				40650	28634	06^{h} 02^{m} 45.11^{s}	+47° 48′ 33.5″	6.49	4.22	93	F5	
				49364	32746	06^{h} 49^{m} 44.30^{s}	+37° 30′ 45.8″	6.49	−0.33	753	K5	
				36484	26054	05^{h} 33^{m} 27.41^{s}	+32° 48′ 04.7″	6.50	1.70	297	A2m	
				38200	27164	05^{h} 45^{m} 29.59^{s}	+31° 19′ 29.5″	6.50	−0.94	1003	K0	
42 Aur		42		43244	29884	06^{h} 17^{m} 34.68^{s}	+46° 25′ 26.1″	6.53	2.24	235	F0V	
HD 40979				40979	28767	06^{h} 04^{m} 29.94^{s}	+44° 15′ 37.6″	6.74	4.13	109	F8V	has a planet (b)
LY Aur			LY	35921	25733	05^{h} 29^{m} 42.6511^{s}	+35° 22′ 30.089″	6.85	-2.09	2000	O9.5+O9.5eaII-III	Beta Lyrae variable, V_{max} = 6.66^{m}, V_{min} = 7.35^{m}, P = 4.00249 d
12 Aur		12		33988		05^{h} 16^{m} 27.10^{s}	+46° 24′ 56.0″	6.90			B5	
25 Cam		(25)		37735	27027	05^{h} 43^{m} 58.59^{s}	+54° 51′ 53.4″	6.94	0.25	709	A0	
AB Aur			AB	31293	22910	04^{h} 55^{m} 45.84^{s}	+30° 33′ 04.29″	7.06	1.27	469	A0Vpe	Orion variable, V_{max} = 6.3^{m}, V_{min} = 8.4^{m}; has a dust disk in which planets or brown dwarfs may be forming
33 Cam		(33)		39724	28214	05^{h} 57^{m} 40.57^{s}	+55° 39′ 24.1″	7.15	0.39	734	A0	
V420 Aur			V420	34921	25114	05^{h} 22^{m} 35.2305^{s}	+37° 40′ 33.629″	7.45	-4.5	8000	B0IVpe	high mass X-ray Binary; Be star; variable, V_{max} = 7.42^{m}, V_{min} = 7.53^{m}
EO Aur			EO	34333	24744	05^{h} 18^{m} 21.0655^{s}	+36° 37′ 55.336″	7.83	0.001	1200	B5	Algol variable, V_{max} = 7.56^{m}, V_{min} = 8.13^{m}, P = 4.06565 d
HD 45350				45350	30860	06^{h} 28^{m} 45.71^{s}	+38° 57′ 46.7″	7.88	4.43	160	G5IV	Lucilinburhuc; has a planet (b)
HD 43691				43691	30057	06^{h} 19^{m} 34.68^{s}	+41° 05′ 32.3″	8.03	3.18	304	G0IV-V	has a planet (b)
HD 49674				49674	32916	06^{h} 51^{m} 30.52^{s}	+40° 52′ 03.9″	8.10	5.05	133	G5V	Nervia, has a planet (b)
MZ Aur			MZ	34626	24938	05^{h} 20^{m} 33.0354^{s}	+36° 37′ 56.031″	8.16	-2.28	4000	B1.5IVnp	Be star; variable, V_{max} = 8.14^{m}, V_{min} = 8.30^{m}
IU Aur			IU	35652	25565	05^{h} 27^{m} 52.4005^{s}	+34° 46′ 58.25″	8.39	1.73	700	B3Vnne	spectroscopic binary; Beta Lyrae variable, V_{max} = 8.19^{m}, V_{min} = 8.89^{m}, P = 1.81147 d
HD 42012				42012	29242	05^{h} 27^{m} 52.4005^{s}	+34° 46′ 58.25″	8.44		121	K0	has a planet (b)
V423 Aur			V423	34986	25178	05^{h} 23^{m} 10.0664^{s}	+35° 42′ 32.272″	8.68	-3.85	9000	B8	semi-regular pulsating star, V_{max} = 8.63^{m}, V_{min} = 8.79^{m}
KELT-2A				42176A	29301A	06^{h} 10^{m} 39^{s}	+30° 57′ 25″	8.77	3.23	419	F7V	has a transiting planet KELT-2Ab
WASP-12						06^{h} 30^{m} 33.0^{s}	+29° 40′ 20″	11.69	3.54	1393	G0	has two transiting planet (b & c)
HAT-P-9						07^{h} 20^{m} 40.479^{s}	+37° 08′ 26.17″	12.34	3.93	1564.8	F	Tevel; has a transiting planet HAT-P-9b
NX Aur			NX			05^{h} 23^{m} 04.262^{s}	+33° 28′ 46.43″	14.1	1.1	13000	B4Ve	PMS star in NGC 1893
GD 66						05^{h} 20^{m} 38.31^{s}	+30° 48′ 24.1″	15.56	12.02	166	DA	white dwarf, has a possible planet
Table legend: • Name = Proper name • B = Bayer designation • F or/and G. = Flamsteed designation or Gould designation • Var = Variable-star designation • HD = Henry Draper Catalogue designation number • HIP = Hipparcos Catalogue designation number • RA = Right ascension for the Epoch/Equinox J2000.0 • Dec = Declination for the Epoch/Equinox J2000.0 • vis. mag. = visual magnitude (m or m_{v}), also known as apparent magnitude • abs. mag. = absolute magnitude (M_{v}) • Dist. (ly) = Distance in light-years from Earth • Sp. class = Spectral class of the star in the stellar classification system • Notes = Common name(s) or alternate name(s); comments; notable properties [for example: multiple star status, range of variability if it is a variable star, exoplanets, etc.]

== See also ==
- List of stars by constellation
