= Lucilinburhuc =

Lucilinburhuc may refer to:

- Lucilinburhuc, one of the ancient names of Luxembourg.
- Lucilinburhuc, official name of star HD 45350, in the constellation Auriga.
