= RW Persei =

Star system in the constellation Perseus

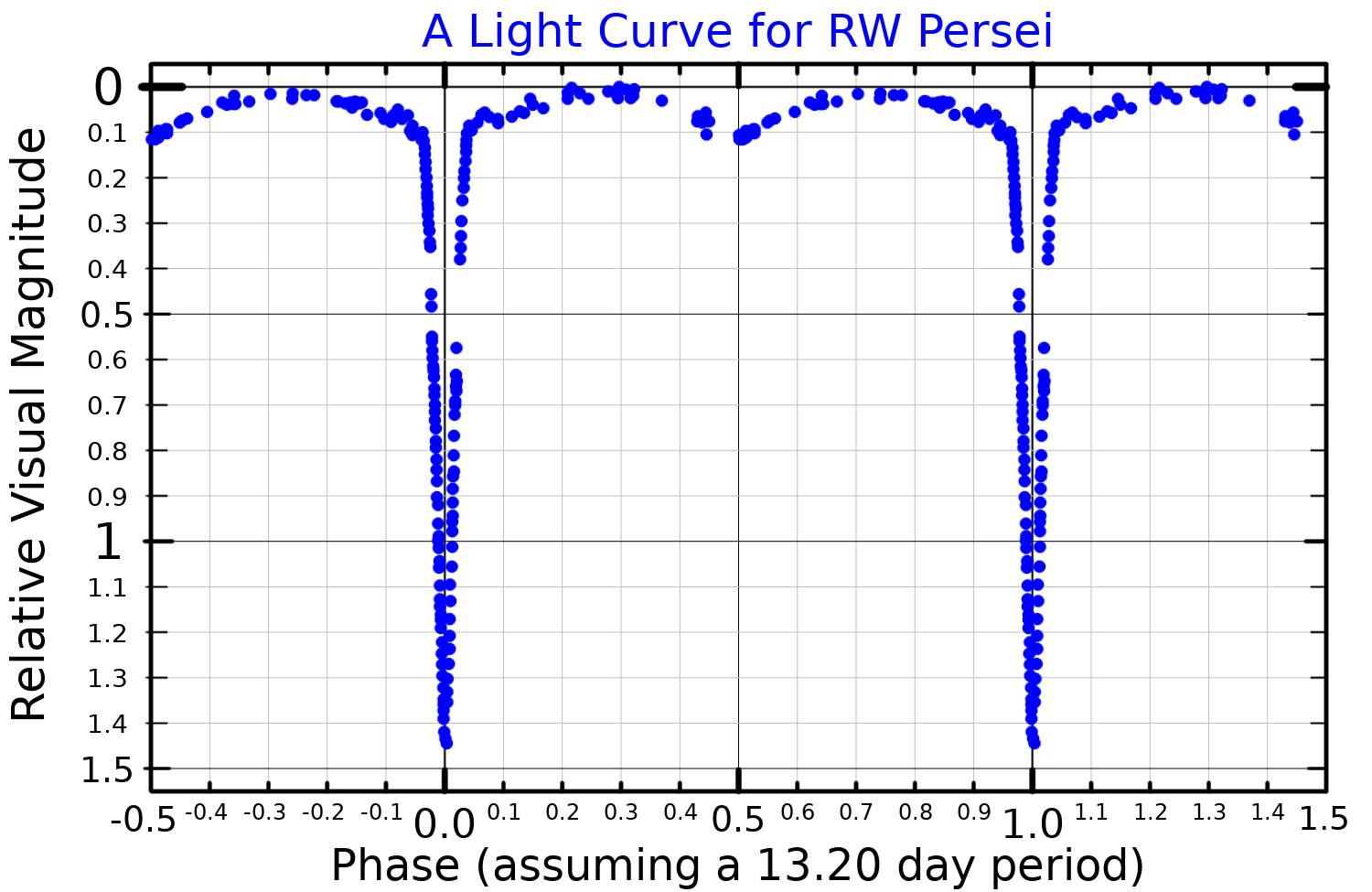
- A visual band light curve for RW Persei, adapted from Olson et al. (1992)

Observation data Epoch J2000.0 Equinox ICRS
- Constellation: Perseus
- Right ascension: 04^{h} 20^{m} 16.764^{s}
- Declination: +42° 18′ 51.81″
- Apparent magnitude (V): 9.68 min_{1}: 11.36 min_{2}: 9.78

Characteristics
- Spectral type: B9.6e + K2III-IV
- Variable type: Semi-detached Algol variable

Astrometry
Radial velocity (R_{v})	5.8±2.7 km/s
Proper motion (μ)	RA: −3.965 mas/yr Dec.: −5.345 mas/yr
Parallax (π)	2.163±0.0343 mas
Distance	1,510 ± 20 ly (462 ± 7 pc)
Absolute magnitude (M_{V})	+0.4/+1.6

Orbit
Period (P)	13.198949 d
Eccentricity (e)	0.00
Inclination (i)	81.56°
Periastron epoch (T)	2,416,032.0070 JD
Semi-amplitude (K_{1}) (primary)	18.5 km/s
Semi-amplitude (K_{2}) (secondary)	6.5 km/s

Details

Primary
Mass	2.56 M_{☉}
Radius	2.8 R_{☉}
Luminosity	62 L_{☉}
Temperature	9,700 K

Secondary
Mass	0.38 M_{☉}
Radius	7.3 R_{☉}
Luminosity	33 L_{☉}
Temperature	4,200 K

Other designations
- BE Cet, BD+41°851, HD 276247, HIP 20245

Database references
SIMBAD	data

RW Persei is a eclipsing binary star system in the northern constellation of Perseus. It has a peak apparent visual magnitude of 9.68, so this system is too faint to be viewed with the naked eye. During the primary eclipse the brightness decreases to magnitude 11.36, but only to magnitude 9.78 with the secondary eclipse. The distance to RW Persei is approximately 1,510 light years, based on parallax measurements. It is receding from the Sun with a radial velocity of 5.8±2.7 km/s.

== Observations ==
The variability of this star was discovered by Sigurd Enebo, for which he received the 1906 Lindemann Award from the Astronomische Gesellschaft. He classified it as an Algol variable and found a period of 13.196 days. Enebo refined the period to 13.1989 days in 1910. The low brightness and relatively long period of this system meant that it received little study for many decades. In 1945, O. Struve found emission lines, but (except for the H-alpha emission lines) only during an eclipse. It has a deep primary eclipse with only a minor secondary eclipse. He interpreted the emission as a nebulous stream moving with the eclipsed star.

D. S. Hall noted a rapid decrease in the duration of the primary eclipse in 1967, becoming a partial eclipse. Observations made in 1974 suggested a possible period change in the eclipse cycle. In 1986, J. J. Dobias and M. J. Plavec determined the primary component to be a Be star with an optically thick accretion disk in orbit. The secondary is an ordinary K2 giant star. Subsequent observations in 1988 and 1989 failed to confirm this disk, although they did show that the primary component must be spinning at 30 times the rate of synchronous rotation.

In 1991, the eclipse amplitude was found to have changed multiple times, declining from a magnitude difference of 3.20 in 1900 down to 1.75 in blue light. This is the second system shown to undergo such large adjustments in eclipse amplitude after IU Aurigae. The changes suggested a wobble in the orbital plane caused by an orbiting third body in the system. Alterations in the O–C diagram supported this interpretation, giving an orbital period of 68 years for the third body. However, a photometric study in 1992 failed to confirm the presence of a third body in the system. Instead, it was proposed that changes in the polar radius of the primary, brought on by accretion and slowed rotation, may explain the variations.
