= Mu Aurigae =

Star in the constellation Auriga

- Location of μ Aurigae (circled)

Observation data Epoch J2000.0 Equinox J2000.0 (ICRS)
- Constellation: Auriga
- Right ascension: 05^{h} 13^{m} 25.722^{s}
- Declination: +38° 29′ 04.20″
- Apparent magnitude (V): +4.88

Characteristics
- Spectral type: A4 Vm (kA3hA8VmA8)
- U−B color index: +0.10
- B−V color index: +0.18

Astrometry
Radial velocity (R_{v})	+26.0±1.2 km/s
Proper motion (μ)	RA: −20.673 mas/yr Dec.: −75.488 mas/yr
Parallax (π)	20.1016±0.5023 mas
Distance	162 ± 4 ly (50 ± 1 pc)
Absolute magnitude (M_{V})	+1.47

Details
Mass	1.90±0.30 M_{☉}
Radius	2.53±0.09 R_{☉}
Luminosity	22.8±1.2 L_{☉}
Surface gravity (log g)	3.91±0.08 cgs
Temperature	7,931±126 K
Metallicity [Fe/H]	−0.3 dex
Rotational velocity (v sin i)	80.0 km/s
Age	560 Myr

Other designations
- μ Aur, 11 Aurigae, BD+38°1063, FK5 192, GC 6375, HD 33641, HIP 24340, HR 1689, SAO 57755, PPM 70052, WDS J05134+3829AB

Database references
SIMBAD	data

Mu Aurigae is a candidate binary star system in the northern constellation of Auriga. Its name is a Bayer designation that is Latinized from μ Aurigae, and abbreviated Mu Aur or μ Aur. This star is visible to the naked eye with an apparent visual magnitude of +4.88. Based upon an annual parallax shift of 20.10 mas as seen from Earth, it is located approximately 162 light-years from the Sun. This system is drifting further away with a radial velocity of +26 km/s.

This is an A-type main-sequence star with a stellar classification of A4 Vm; the 'm' suffix indicating that abnormal abundances of heavier elements appear in the star's spectrum, making this an Am star. It is 560 million years old with a projected rotational velocity of 80 km/s. This star has 1.90 the mass of the Sun and 2.5 times the Sun's radius. It is radiating 23 times the Sun's luminosity from its photosphere at an effective temperature of 7,931 K.

A very close companion has been reported using speckle interferometry, but this remains unconfirmed. The separation at discovery in 1986 was 0.07 mas and it was measured at 0.066 mas in 1999. It was catalogued by Hipparcos as a problem binary, indicating that the measurements of its position were not consistent with the motion of a single star, and no satisfactory orbit could be found to match the motion.

== Name ==
This star, along with λ Aur and σ Aur, were Kazwini's Al Ḣibāʽ (ألحباع), the Tent. According to the catalogue of stars in the Technical Memorandum 33-507 - A Reduced Star Catalog Containing 537 Named Stars, Al Ḣibāʽ were the title for three stars: λ Aur as Al Ḣibāʽ I, μ Aur as Al Ḣibāʽ II and σ Aur as Al Ḣibāʽ III.

In Chinese, 天潢 (Tiān Guāng), meaning Celestial Pier, refers to an asterism consisting of μ Aurigae, 19 Aurigae, φ Aurigae, 14 Aurigae and σ Aurigae. Consequently, μ Aurigae itself is known as 天潢五 (Tiān Guāng wu, English: the First Star of Celestial Pier).
