= HD 45350 b =

Extrasolar planet in the constellation of Auriga orbiting the star HD 45350

HD 45350 b / Peitruss
Discovery
- Discovered by: Marcy, Butler, Vogt, et al.
- Discovery site: Keck Observatory, Hawaii; United States
- Discovery date: January 20, 2005
- Detection method: Radial velocity

Orbital characteristics
- Apastron: 3.41 AU (510,000,000 km)
- Periastron: 0.43 AU (64,000,000 km)
- Semi-major axis: 1.92 ± 0.067 AU (287,200,000 ± 10,000,000 km)
- Eccentricity: 0.778 ± 0.009
- Orbital period (sidereal): 963.6 ± 3.4 d 2.64 ± 0.01 y
- Average orbital speed: 21.7
- Time of periastron: 2,451,825.3 ± 7.1
- Argument of periastron: 343.4 ± 2.3
- Semi-amplitude: 58.0 ± 1.7
- Star: HD 45350

HD 45350 b is an extrasolar planet located approximately 160 light-years away in the constellation of Auriga. It has a minimum mass about 1.79 times that of Jupiter. The mean distance of the planet from the star is more than the distance between Mars and the Sun, but due to the planet's high orbital eccentricity, it is as close to the star as Mercury is from the Sun at periastron, while at apastron, it is eight times further.

Dynamical simulations covering a period of 10^{7} years show that a second, low-mass, planet could only orbit stably if it were no more than 0.2 AU away from the star; in the simulations, these planets show oscillations in eccentricity up to an eccentricity of 0.25. Radial velocity observations rule out any such planet whose mass is greater than 4 Neptune masses.

== Naming ==
The planet HD 45350 b is named Peitruss. The name was selected in the NameExoWorlds campaign by Luxembourg, during the 100th anniversary of the IAU. Peitruss is derived from the name of the Luxembourg river Pétrusse. The 2019–2020 class of 3B from the Luxembourgish Echternach high school won the contest to name both the star and its planet. The students who helped name both celestial objects were Lucien Nicolas Berger, Léna Boucq Kieffel, Ben de Boer, Cédric Dehlez, Nicolas Delhez, Sergio Manuel Dias Costa, Pierre Fusshoeller, Jil Menei, Philippe Schaack and Claire Zeien. The overseeing committee members who organized the contest and the vote of the respective celestial objects were Eric Buttini, Patrick Michaely, Nicolas Faber, Jeanny-Jungbluth-Schmidt and Yanna Di Ronco.
