= HD 49674 =

Star in the constellation Auriga

HD 49674 / Nervia
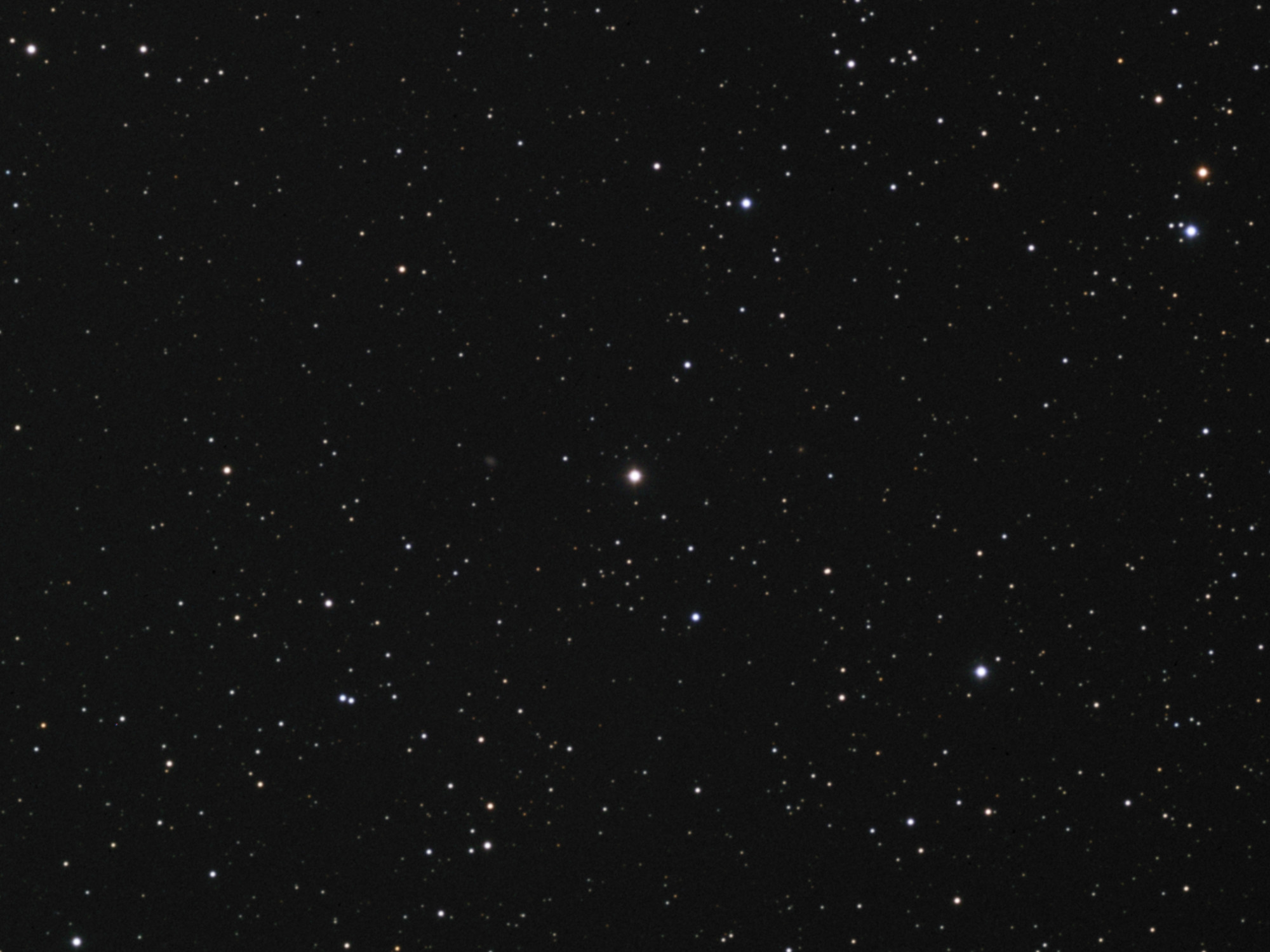
- HD 49674 (center) in optical light

Observation data Epoch J2000 Equinox ICRS
- Constellation: Auriga
- Right ascension: 06^{h} 51^{m} 30.51621^{s}
- Declination: +40° 52′ 03.9241″
- Apparent magnitude (V): 8.10

Characteristics
- Evolutionary stage: main sequence
- Spectral type: G3V
- B−V color index: 0.729±0.015

Astrometry
Radial velocity (R_{v})	11.98±0.13 km/s
Proper motion (μ)	RA: 34.682 mas/yr Dec.: −122.686 mas/yr
Parallax (π)	23.3216±0.0218 mas
Distance	139.9 ± 0.1 ly (42.88 ± 0.04 pc)
Absolute magnitude (M_{V})	4.88

Details
Mass	1.07±0.02 M_{☉}
Radius	1.01±0.01 R_{☉}
Luminosity	0.96±0.01 L_{☉}
Surface gravity (log g)	4.46±0.02 cgs
Temperature	5,702±28 K
Metallicity [Fe/H]	0.34±0.06 dex
Rotational velocity (v sin i)	4.7 km/s
Age	1.8±1.2 Gyr

Other designations
- Nervia, BD+41°1544, HD 49674, HIP 32916, SAO 41390, PPM 49392, TYC 2946-426-1, GSC 02946-00426

Database references
SIMBAD	data
Exoplanet Archive	data

HD 49674 is a solar-type star with an exoplanetary companion in the northern constellation of Auriga. It has an apparent visual magnitude of 8.10 and thus is an eighth-magnitude star that is too faint to be readily visible to the naked eye. The system is located at a distance of 140 light-years from the Sun based on parallax, and is drifting further away with a radial velocity of +12 km/s.

HD 49674, and its planetary system, was chosen as part of the 2019 NameExoWorlds campaign organised by the International Astronomical Union, which assigned each country a star and planet to be named. HD 49674 was assigned to Belgium. The winning proposal named the star Nervia and the planet Eburonia, both after prominent Belgic tribes, the Nervii and Eburones, respectively.

This is an ordinary G-type main-sequence star with a stellar classification of G3V, which indicates it is generating energy through hydrogen fusion at its core. Spinning with a projected rotational velocity of 4.7 km/s, it is younger than the Sun, roughly two billion years of age, and is a metal-rich star. HD 49674 has a similar mass and radius as the Sun. It is radiating 96% of the Sun's luminosity from its photosphere at an effective temperature of 5,702 K.

== Planetary system ==
At the time of discovery of the planet HD 49674 b in 2002, it was the least massive exoplanet known, very close to the boundary between sub-Jupiter mass and Neptune mass at 0.1 M_{J}. This planet orbits very close to the star, with a semimajor axis of 0.0580 AU (8.68 Gm).

The HD 49674 planetary system
Companion (in order from star)	Mass	Semimajor axis (AU)	Orbital period (days)	Eccentricity	Inclination (°)	Radius
b / Eburonia	>0.105 ± 0.011 M_{J}	0.0580 ± 0.0034	4.94737 ± 0.00098	0.087 ± 0.095	—	—

== See also ==
- Lists of exoplanets
