= Sigma Aurigae =

Star in the constellation Auriga

σ Aurigae
- Location of σ Aurigae (circled)

Observation data Epoch J2000 Equinox ICRS
- Constellation: Auriga
- Right ascension: 05^{h} 24^{m} 39.141^{s}
- Declination: +37° 23′ 07.26″
- Apparent magnitude (V): 4.99

Characteristics
- Evolutionary stage: red giant branch
- Spectral type: K3III CN+2
- U−B color index: +1.75
- B−V color index: +1.42

Astrometry
Radial velocity (R_{v})	−19.7 km/s
Proper motion (μ)	RA: −0.564 mas/yr Dec.: −10.953 mas/yr
Parallax (π)	6.3543±0.0892 mas
Distance	513 ± 7 ly (157 ± 2 pc)
Absolute magnitude (M_{V})	−0.75

Details
Radius	43.72+1.08 −3.24 R_{☉}
Luminosity	496±20 L_{☉}
Surface gravity (log g)	1.75 cgs
Temperature	4,120+162 −50 K
Metallicity [Fe/H]	−0.03 dex
Rotational velocity (v sin i)	10 km/s

Other designations
- σ Aur, 21 Aurigae, BD+37°1175, GC 6636, HD 35186, HIP 25292, HR 1773, SAO 57981, PPM 70308, WDS J05247+3723A

Database references
SIMBAD	data

Sigma Aurigae is a star in the northern constellation of Auriga. Its name is a Bayer designation that is Latinized from σ Aurigae, and abbreviated Sigma Aur or σ Aur. This star is faintly visible to the naked eye with an apparent visual magnitude of 4.99. With an annual parallax shift of 6.35 mas, it is approximately 530 light-years (160 parsecs) distant from the Earth. It is drifting closer to the Sun with a radial velocity of −20 km/s.

This is an evolved giant star with a stellar classification of K3III CN+2, indicating that it has exhausted the supply of hydrogen at its core. The 'CN+2' notation indicates anomalously strong lines of the CN molecule in the spectrum. This star has expanded to 44 times the radius of the Sun and is radiating nearly 500 times the Sun's luminosity from its enlarged photosphere at an effective temperature of 4,120 K. There is a 12th magnitude companion at an angular separation of 8 arcseconds, as well as two fainter companions at 28 and 35" respectively. All are background objects, stars much further away than Sigma itself.

Sigma Aurigae, along with λ Aur and μ Aur, were Kazwini's Al Ḣibāʽ (ألحباع), the Tent. According to the catalogue of stars in the Technical Memorandum 33-507 – A Reduced Star Catalog Containing 537 Named Stars, Al Ḣibāʽ were the title for three stars: λ Aur as Al Ḣibāʽ I, μ Aur as Al Ḣibāʽ II and σ Aur as Al Ḣibāʽ III.
