= 41 Aurigae =

Binary star system in the constellation Auriga

Observation data Epoch J2000 Equinox ICRS
- Constellation: Auriga
- 41 Aur A
- Right ascension: 06^{h} 11^{m} 36.59170^{s}
- Declination: +48° 42′ 39.5571″
- Apparent magnitude (V): 6.15
- 41 Aur B
- Right ascension: 06^{h} 11^{m} 36.55276^{s}
- Declination: +48° 42′ 47.0365″
- Apparent magnitude (V): 6.84

Characteristics

41 Aur A
- Evolutionary stage: Main sequence
- Spectral type: A2Va+
- B−V color index: 0.06

41 Aur B
- Evolutionary stage: main sequence
- Spectral type: kA5hA5mF0(IV-V)
- B−V color index: 0.15

Astrometry

41 Aur A
Radial velocity (R_{v})	31 km/s
Proper motion (μ)	RA: +14.994 mas/yr Dec.: −55.704 mas/yr
Parallax (π)	10.6629±0.0539 mas
Distance	306 ± 2 ly (93.8 ± 0.5 pc)

41 Aur B
Radial velocity (R_{v})	29 km/s
Proper motion (μ)	RA: +19.171 mas/yr Dec.: −52.460 mas/yr
Parallax (π)	10.5899±0.0969 mas
Distance	308 ± 3 ly (94.4 ± 0.9 pc)

Details

41 Aur A
Mass	2.31 M_{☉}
Radius	2.08 R_{☉}
Luminosity	27 L_{☉}
Surface gravity (log g)	4.17 cgs
Temperature	9,114 K
Rotational velocity (v sin i)	138 km/s

41 Aur B
Mass	1.76 M_{☉}
Radius	1.91 R_{☉}
Luminosity	11 L_{☉}
Surface gravity (log g)	4.13 cgs
Temperature	7,586 K
Rotational velocity (v sin i)	133 km/s

Other designations
- 41 Aur, BD+48°1352, HIP 29388, ADS 4773, WDS J06116+4843
- 41 Aur A: GC 7853, HD 42127, HR 2176, SAO 40925
- 41 Aur B: GC 7851, HD 42126, HR 2175, SAO 40924

Database references
SIMBAD	41 Aur A
- 41 Aur B

41 Aurigae is a binary star system located around 310–316 light years away from the Sun in the northern constellation of Auriga. It is visible to the naked eye as a dim, white-hued star with a combined apparent visual magnitude of 5.83. This system is moving further from the Earth with a heliocentric radial velocity of 31 km/s. It is a probable member of the Hyades Supercluster.

As of 2012, the pair had an angular separation of 7.39″ along a position angle of 357.7°. The primary component is an A-type main-sequence star with a stellar classification of A2Va+ and a visual magnitude of 6.15. The magnitude 6.84 secondary companion is a possible Am star with a stellar classification of kA5hA5mF0(IV-V), showing the calcium K line and hydrogen lines of an A5 star and the metal lines of an F0 star.
