= HD 40979 b =

Extrasolar planet orbiting HD 40979

Discovery
- Discovered by: Fischer et al.
- Discovery site: Lick and Keck Observatory; Fairborn Observatory; USA
- Discovery date: 13 June 2002
- Detection method: Radial velocity

Orbital characteristics
- Apastron: 1.085 AU (162,300,000 km)
- Periastron: 0.625 AU (93,500,000 km)
- Semi-major axis: 0.855 ± 0.049 AU (127,900,000 ± 7,300,000 km)
- Eccentricity: 0.269 ± 0.034
- Orbital period (sidereal): 263.84 ± 0.71 d 0.72 y
- Average orbital speed: 35.5
- Time of periastron: 2,451,748.1 ± 8.6
- Argument of periastron: 318 ± 10
- Semi-amplitude: 112 ± 5
- Star: HD 40979

HD 40979 b is an extrasolar planet orbiting the star HD 40979, was detected from the Lick and Keck observatories and photometric observations at Fairborn Observatory reveal low-amplitude brightness variations in HD 40979. It is thought to be a large gas giant planet. It was discovered in 2002 by Debra Fischer.
