= EO Aurigae =

Eclipsing binary star of Algol type in the constellation Auriga

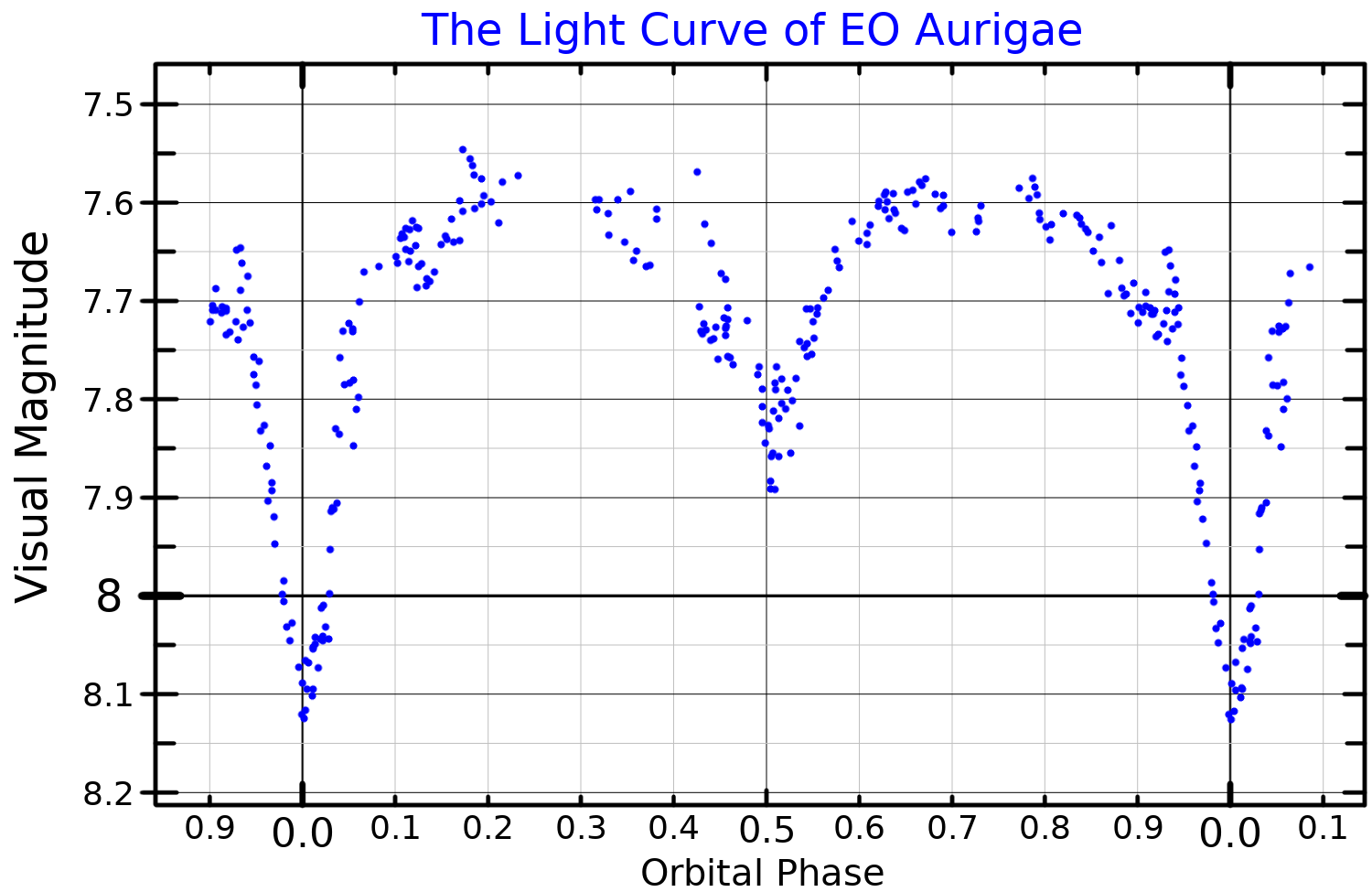
- The visual band light curve of EO Aurigae, adapted from Hartigan (1981)

Observation data Epoch J2000 Equinox ICRS
- Constellation: Auriga
- Right ascension: 05^{h} 18^{m} 21.0672^{s}
- Declination: +36° 37′ 55.362″
- Apparent magnitude (V): 7.71

Characteristics
- Spectral type: B3V + B3V
- Apparent magnitude (G): 7.69
- U−B color index: −0.63
- B−V color index: 0.08
- Variable type: Algol variable

Astrometry
Radial velocity (R_{v})	-1.1 km/s
Proper motion (μ)	RA: −0.479±0.034 mas/yr Dec.: −2.954±0.026 mas/yr
Parallax (π)	0.9420±0.0306 mas
Distance	3,500 ± 100 ly (1,060 ± 30 pc)

Details

EO Aur A
Mass	6.22±0.73 M_{☉}
Luminosity (bolometric)	2,784 L_{☉}
Temperature	13,360 K
Age	23.6±8.0 Myr

EO Aur B
Mass	5.00±2.57 M_{☉}
Luminosity (bolometric)	1,377 L_{☉}
Temperature	11,650 K

Other designations
- BD+36° 1073, HD 34333, HIP 24744, SAO 57857, Gaia DR3 187043317482036224.

Database references
SIMBAD	data

EO Aurigae is an eclipsing binary of Algol type in the northern constellation of Auriga. With a combined apparent magnitude of 7.71, it is too faint to be seen with the unaided eye.

The eclipsing binary nature of the star was detected in 1943 by Sergei Gaposchkin at Harvard College Observatory. It consists of a pair of B-type main sequence stars orbiting each other with a period of 4.0656 days. During the eclipse of the primary star, the combined magnitude drops by 0.57; the eclipse of the secondary component drops the magnitude by 0.33.
