= HD 33463 =

Suspected variable star in the constellation Auriga

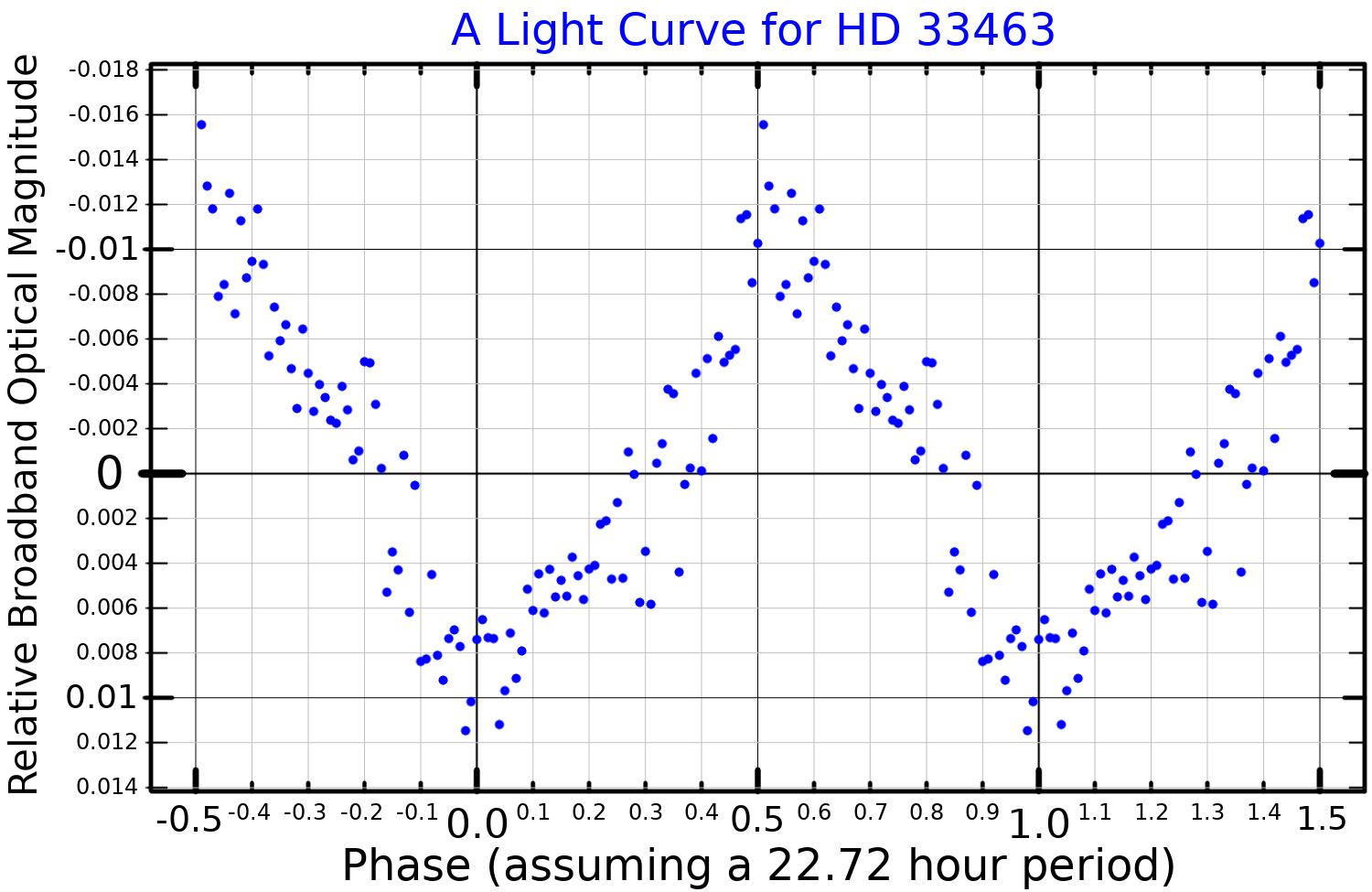
- A light curve for HD 33463, plotted from data published by Burggraaff et al. (2018)

Observation data Epoch J2000 Equinox ICRS
- Constellation: Auriga
- Right ascension: 05^{h} 11^{m} 38.31132^{s}
- Declination: +29° 54′ 12.8293″
- Apparent magnitude (V): 6.4419±0.0027

Characteristics
- Evolutionary stage: red giant
- Spectral type: M2III
- B−V color index: +1.78
- Variable type: Suspected

Astrometry
Radial velocity (R_{v})	10.64±0.22 km/s
Proper motion (μ)	RA: +7.895 mas/yr Dec.: −21.036 mas/yr
Parallax (π)	3.1107±0.1553 mas
Distance	1,050 ± 50 ly (320 ± 20 pc)
Absolute magnitude (M_{V})	−1.07

Details
Mass	1.3 M_{☉}
Radius	133 R_{☉}
Luminosity	2,114 L_{☉}
Surface gravity (log g)	0.37 cgs
Temperature	3,753 K
Metallicity [Fe/H]	−0.32 dex

Other designations
- BD+29°833, HD 33463, HIP 24193, SAO 77025, NSV 16257

Database references
SIMBAD	data

HD 33463 is a suspected variable star in the northern constellation of Auriga, about 1,050 light years away. It is a red giant star with a stellar classification of M2III, and has expanded away from the main sequence after exhausting its core hydrogen. It has reached 133 times the size of the Sun and, at an effective temperature of 3,753 K it shines at a bolometric luminosity of 2,114 L_{☉}.

Hipparcos satellite data showed possible variations in the apparent magnitude of HD 33463 and it was given the suspected variable star designation NSV 16257. Observations with MASCARA, a camera designed to detect exoplanets, show brightness variations with a maximum amplitude of 21 thousandths of a magnitude and a period slightly less than a day.
