= HD 40979 =

Triple star system in the constellation Auriga

Observation data Epoch J2000 Equinox ICRS
- Constellation: Auriga
- Right ascension: 06^{h} 04^{m} 29.94314^{s}
- Declination: +44° 15′ 37.5939″
- Apparent magnitude (V): 6.74 + 9.11 + 12.00

Characteristics
- Evolutionary stage: main sequence
- Spectral type: F7V
- Apparent magnitude (G): 6.62
- B−V color index: 0.573±0.007

Astrometry
Radial velocity (R_{v})	+32.56±0.13 km/s
Proper motion (μ)	RA: +95.066±0.021 mas/yr Dec.: −152.651±0.017 mas/yr
Parallax (π)	29.4299±0.0213 mas
Distance	110.82 ± 0.08 ly (33.98 ± 0.02 pc)
Absolute magnitude (M_{V})	4.14

Details

A
Mass	1.21 or 1.45 M_{☉}
Radius	1.26±0.03 R_{☉}
Luminosity	1.960+0.003 −0.004 L_{☉}
Surface gravity (log g)	4.35 cgs
Temperature	6,077+82 −72 K
Metallicity [Fe/H]	1.14 dex
Rotational velocity (v sin i)	9.1 km/s
Age	2.51 Gyr

B
Mass	0.833±0.011 M_{☉}
Radius	0.78 R_{☉}
Luminosity	0.301 L_{☉}
Surface gravity (log g)	4.35 cgs
Temperature	4,992 K
Metallicity [Fe/H]	0.12 dex
Rotational velocity (v sin i)	3.3±2.2 km/s

Other designations
- BD+44°1353, GC 7670, HD 40979, HIP 28767, SAO 40830, PPM 48712, WDS J06045+4416A, GSC 02937-01747, 2MASS J06042993+4415379

Database references
SIMBAD	data

HD 40979 is a triple star system in the northern constellation of Auriga. The combined brightness of this group lies below the typical limit of visibility to the naked eye at an apparent visual magnitude of 6.74. It is located at a distance of approximately 111 light years from the Sun based on parallax. The system is receding with a radial velocity of +32 km/s. It has a relatively high rate of proper motion, traversing the celestial sphere at the rate of 0.182″ per year.

The primary, designated component A, is an F-type main-sequence star with a stellar classification of F7V. It is an estimated 2.51 billion years old and is spinning with a projected rotational velocity of 9.1 km/s. The star has 1.21 times the mass of the Sun and 1.26 times the Sun's radius. It has a higher metallicity than the Sun – what astronomers term the relative abundance of elements with a higher atomic number than helium. The star is radiating 1.96 times the luminosity of the Sun from its photosphere at an effective temperature of 6,077 K. As of 2002, there is one extrasolar planet known to be orbiting around this star. An infrared excess suggests a debris disk is orbiting the star at a separation of 16.10 AU with a mean temperature of 80 K.

The magnitude 9.11 secondary, component B, is a co-moving companion at an angular separation of 192.5″ from the primary, which corresponds to a projected separation of around 6,400 AU. It has 83% of the mass of the Sun. This star in turn has a magnitude 12.00 companion, component C, at a separation of 3.877″±0.013″ along a position angle of 37.969°±0.178°, as of 2015. This equates to a projected separation of 129 AU. The star has an estimated 0.38 times the Sun's mass.

== Planetary system ==
In 2003, the detection of a giant planet orbiting the primary was announced. It was discovered using the radial velocity method, which allow selected orbital elements of this object to be determined.

The HD 40979A planetary system
Companion (in order from star)	Mass	Semimajor axis (AU)	Orbital period (days)	Eccentricity	Inclination (°)	Radius
b	≥3.83±0.36 M_{J}	0.855±0.049	263.84±0.71	0.269±0.034	—	—

== See also ==
- List of extrasolar planets
