= 18 Aurigae =

Star in the constellation Auriga

Observation data Epoch J2000 Equinox ICRS
- Constellation: Auriga
- Right ascension: 05^{h} 19^{m} 23.75369^{s}
- Declination: +33° 59′ 07.3952″
- Apparent magnitude (V): 6.489

Characteristics
- Evolutionary stage: main sequence
- Spectral type: A7 V
- Apparent magnitude (G): 6.45
- U−B color index: +0.09
- B−V color index: +0.256±0.007

Astrometry
Radial velocity (R_{v})	6.55±0.55 km/s
Proper motion (μ)	RA: +28.281±0.062 mas/yr Dec.: −12.715±0.044 mas/yr
Parallax (π)	13.8604±0.0527 mas
Distance	235.3 ± 0.9 ly (72.1 ± 0.3 pc)
Absolute magnitude (M_{V})	2.31

Details
Mass	1.69±0.03 M_{☉}
Radius	1.92+0.12 −0.03 R_{☉}
Luminosity	10.091±0.063 L_{☉}
Surface gravity (log g)	4.26±0.14 cgs
Temperature	7,432+231 −67 K
Rotational velocity (v sin i)	124 km/s
Age	950 Myr

Other designations
- 18 Aur, BD+33°1010, GC 6504, HD 34499, HIP 24832, HR 1734, SAO 57893, ADS 3893, WDS J05194+3359, Gaia DR3 182009826266321792

Database references
SIMBAD	data

18 Aurigae is a star located 235 light years away from the Sun in the northern constellation of Auriga. The brightness of this object is near the limit of visibility to the naked eye under good viewing conditions, appearing as a dim, white-hued star with an apparent visual magnitude of 6.49. The star is moving away from the Sun with a heliocentric radial velocity of 6.5 km/s.

This is an ordinary A-type main-sequence star with a stellar classification of A7 V, which indicates it is generating energy by hydrogen fusion at its core. The object is 950 million years old with a high rate of spin, showing a projected rotational velocity of 124 km/s. It has 1.7 times the mass of the Sun and 1.9 times the Sun's radius. The star is radiating 10 times the luminosity of the Sun from its photosphere at an effective temperature of 7,432 K.

18 Aurigae has a magnitude 12.50 companion star at an angular separation of 3.90″ along a position angle of 167°, as of 2006.
