= V394 Aurigae =

Star in the constellation Auriga

- Location of V394 Aurigae (circled)

Observation data Epoch J2000 Equinox ICRS
- Constellation: Auriga
- Right ascension: 06^{h} 06^{m} 22.44529^{s}
- Declination: +29° 30′ 44.6832″
- Apparent magnitude (V): 6.01 - 6.11

Characteristics
- Evolutionary stage: AGB
- Spectral type: M3II
- Apparent magnitude (G): 5.02
- U−B color index: 1.94
- B−V color index: 1.73
- Variable type: Semi-regular

Astrometry
Radial velocity (R_{v})	−36.99±0.19 km/s
Proper motion (μ)	RA: 11.503±0.083 mas/yr Dec.: −5.126±0.059 mas/yr
Parallax (π)	3.7146±0.0756 mas
Distance	880 ± 20 ly (269 ± 5 pc)

Details
Radius	85 R_{☉}
Luminosity	985 L_{☉}
Surface gravity (log g)	0.78 cgs
Temperature	3,639 K

Other designations
- DO 11899, HIC 28930, PPM Star Catalogue 95388, STT 129, GC 7725, HIP 28930, SAO 77958, ADS 4673, GCRV 3829, HR 2146, AG+29° 663, IDS 06000+2931, TYC 1876-1774-1, BD+29° 1112, IRAS 06031+2931, UBV M 11751, CCDM J06064+2931, GSC 01876-01774, IRC +30137, YZ 29 2943, CSI+29 1112 1, HD 41429, 2MASS J06062243+2930445, Gaia DR3 3437486803458219904.

Database references
SIMBAD	data

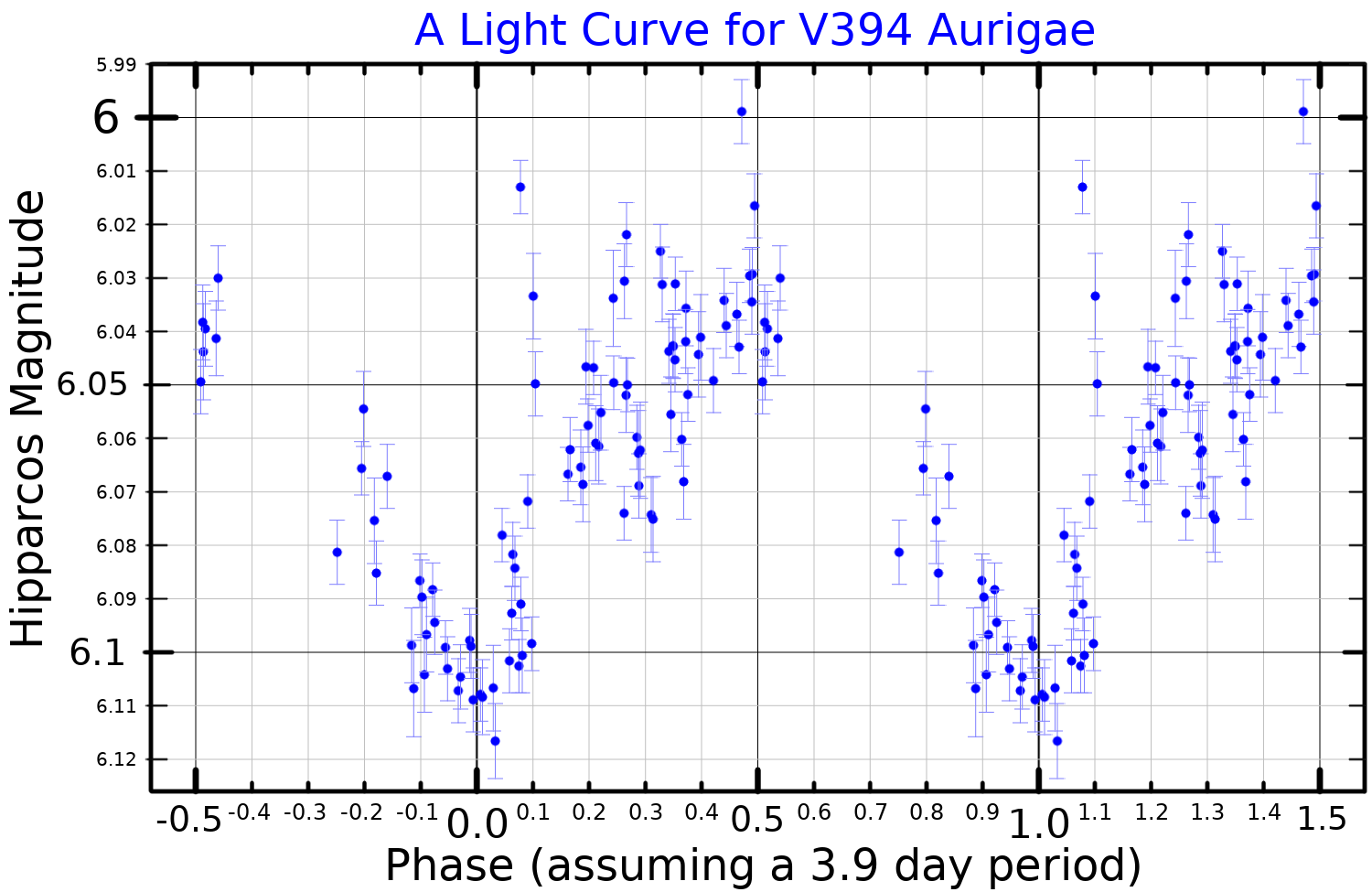
A light curve for V394 Aurigae, plotted from Hipparcos data

V394 Aurigae is a semi-regular variable star in the constellation Auriga. Its brightness varies between magnitudes 6.01 and 6.11, so it is faintly visible to the naked eye under ideal observing conditions. Located around 880 light-years distant, V394 Aurigae shines with a luminosity approximately 985 times that of the Sun and has a surface temperature of 3,639 K.

In 1991, Leroy F. Snyder discovered that the star, then called HR 2146, is a variable star. It was given its variable star designation, V394 Aurigae, in 1993. Koen and Eyer found that the star's brightness, as seen by Hipparcos, varies with a period of 3.9 days.

It is a double star: the secondary, designated V394 Aurigae B, is an eleventh-magnitude F7V star with a separation of 10 arcseconds.
