= Lambda Aurigae =

Solar analog star in the constellation Auriga

λ Aurigae
- Location of λ Aurigae (circled)

Observation data Epoch J2000 Equinox ICRS
- Constellation: Auriga
- Right ascension: 05^{h} 19^{m} 08.475^{s}
- Declination: +40° 05′ 56.59″
- Apparent magnitude (V): 4.71

Characteristics
- Evolutionary stage: subgiant
- Spectral type: G1 V or G1.5 IV-V Fe-1
- U−B color index: +0.13
- B−V color index: +0.62
- R−I color index: 0.32

Astrometry
Radial velocity (R_{v})	+66.36±0.12 km/s
Proper motion (μ)	RA: +520.569 mas/yr Dec.: −664.488 mas/yr
Parallax (π)	79.6021±0.1005 mas
Distance	40.97 ± 0.05 ly (12.56 ± 0.02 pc)
Absolute magnitude (M_{V})	4.20

Details
Mass	1.081+0.054 −0.029 M_{☉}
Radius	1.261±0.027 R_{☉}
Luminosity	1.78±0.11 L_{☉}
Surface gravity (log g)	4.35±0.08 cgs
Temperature	5,936±45 K
Metallicity [Fe/H]	+0.12 dex
Rotational velocity (v sin i)	2 km/s
Age	4, 5.0–7.9 Gyr

Other designations
- λ Aur, 15 Aurigae, BD+39°1248, FK5 1145, GC 6494, GJ 197, HD 34411, HIP 24813, HR 1729, SAO 40233, PPM 47977, WDS J05191+4006A, LFT 403, LHS 1753, LTT 11625

Database references
SIMBAD	data
ARICNS	data

Lambda Aurigae is a Sun-like star in the northern constellation of Auriga. Its name is a Bayer designation that is Latinized from λ Aurigae, and abbreviated Lambda Aur or λ Aur. This star is visible to the naked eye with an apparent visual magnitude of 4.71. Based upon parallax measurements, it is 41 light-years (13 parsecs) distant from the Earth. The star is drifting further away with a high radial velocity of +66.5 km/s, having come to within 24.4 ly (7.5 pc) some 117,300 years ago. It has a high proper motion, traversing the celestial sphere at the rate of 0.844″ per year.

== Properties ==
This is a G-type main sequence star with a stellar classification of G1 V. It is sometimes listed with a class of G1.5 IV-V Fe-1, which indicates the spectrum is showing some features of a more evolved subgiant star along with a noticeable underabundance of iron. In terms of composition it is similar to the Sun. The star has 1.081 times the mass and 1.261 times the Sun's radius. It is 78% more luminous than the Sun and radiates this energy from its outer atmosphere at an effective temperature of 5,936 K. At this heat, the star glows with the yellow hue of a G-type star. It has a low level of magnetic activity and is a candidate Maunder minimum analog.

Lambda Aurigae has been examined for the presence of excess infrared emission that may indicate the presence of a circumstellar disk of dust, but no significant surplus has been observed. It is a possible member of the Epsilon Indi Moving Group of stars that share a common motion through space. The space velocity components of this star are [U, V, W] = [+76, –39, –6] km/s.

== Name ==
This star may have been called by the name Al Hurr, meaning the fawn in Arabic. Lambda Aurigae, along with μ Aur and σ Aur, were Kazwini's Al Ḣibāʽ (ألحباع), the Tent. According to the catalogue of stars in the Technical Memorandum 33-507 - A Reduced Star Catalog Containing 537 Named Stars, Al Ḣibāʽ were the title for three stars : λ Aur as Al Ḣibāʽ I, μ Aur as Al Ḣibāʽ II and σ Aur as Al Ḣibāʽ III.

In Chinese, 咸池 (Xián Chí), meaning Pool of Harmony, refers to an asterism consisting of λ Aurigae, ρ Aurigae and HD 36041. Consequently, the Chinese name for λ Aurigae itself is 咸池三 (Xián Chí sān, English: the Third Star of Pool of Harmony.)

== Observation ==
From Earth, Lambda Aurigae has an apparent magnitude of 4.71. The closest large neighboring star to Lambda Aurigae is Capella, located 4.5 light-years (1.4 parsecs) away. Hypothetically viewed from Lambda Aurigae, Capella's quadruple star system would have an apparent magnitude of approximately -5.48, about 40 times brighter than Sirius can be seen at maximum brightness from Earth.
