= HAT-P-9b =

Exoplanet in the constellation Auriga

HAT-P-9b / Alef
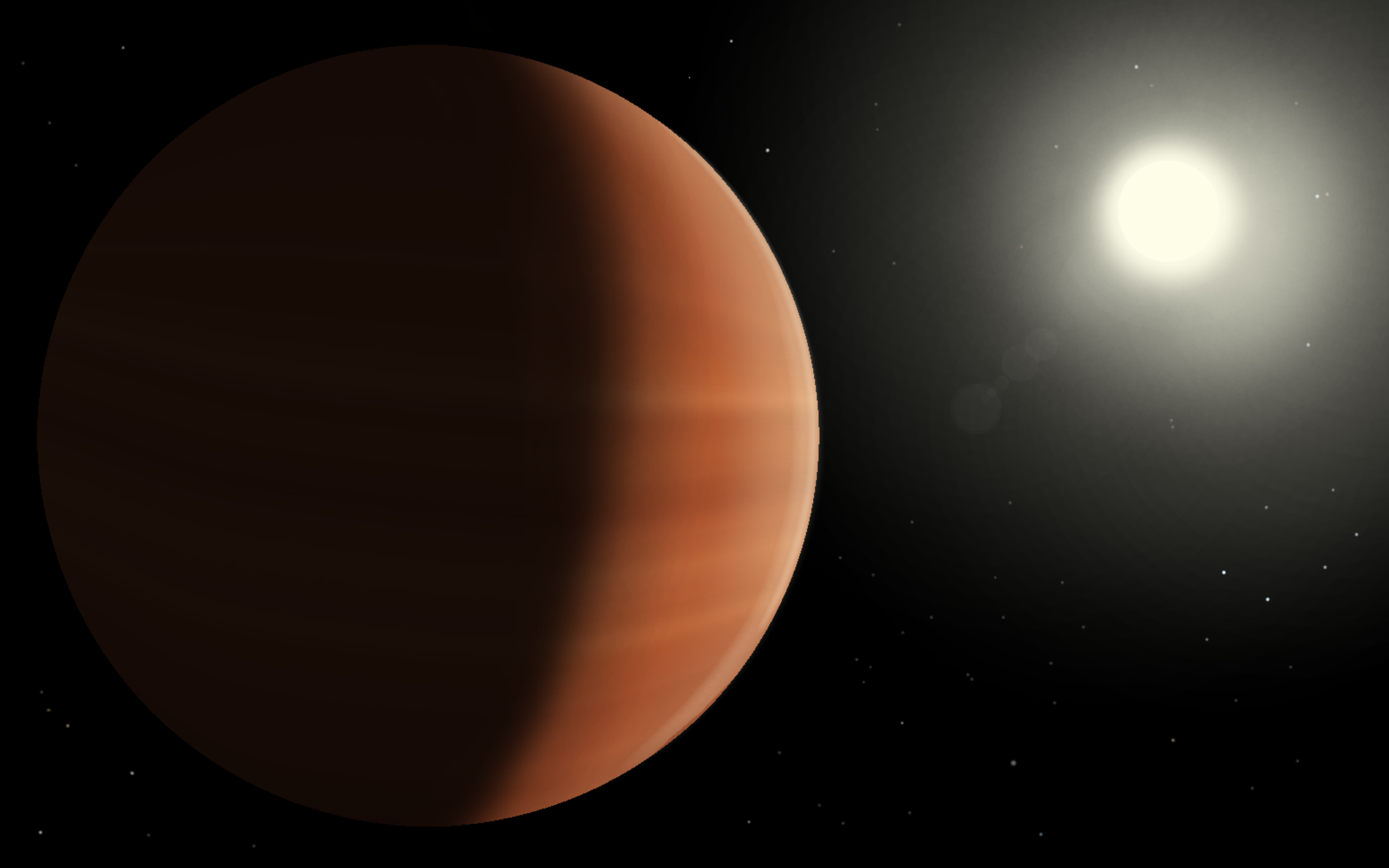
- An artist's impression of HAT-P-9b.

Discovery
- Discovered by: Shporer et al.
- Discovery site: Cambridge, Massachusetts
- Discovery date: June 26, 2008
- Detection method: Transit (SuperWASP)

Orbital characteristics
- Semi-major axis: 0.0528 ± 0.002 AU (7,900,000 ± 300,000 km)
- Eccentricity: ~0.0012
- Orbital period (sidereal): 3.92289 ± 0.00004 d
- Star: HAT-P-9

Physical characteristics
- Mean radius: 1.4 ± 0.06 R_{J}
- Mass: 0.78 ± 0.09 M_{J}
- Mean density: 0.38 g/cm^{3}
- Surface gravity: 10.3 m/s^{2} (34 ft/s^{2}); 1.05 g

HAT-P-9b, formally named Alef, is an exoplanet approximately 1500 light years away in the constellation Auriga. This planet was found by the transit method on June 26, 2008. It has a mass 78% that of Jupiter and a radius 140% that of Jupiter. As with most transiting planets, this planet is a hot Jupiter, meaning this Jupiter-like planet orbits extremely close to its parent star, taking only 3.92 days to orbit.

The study in 2012, utilizing a Rossiter–McLaughlin effect, have determined the planetary orbit is mildly misaligned with the rotational axis of the star, misalignment equal to -16±8°.

The name Alef was selected in the NameExoWorlds campaign by Israel, during the 100th anniversary of the IAU. Alef is the first letter in the Hebrew alphabet and also means bull.

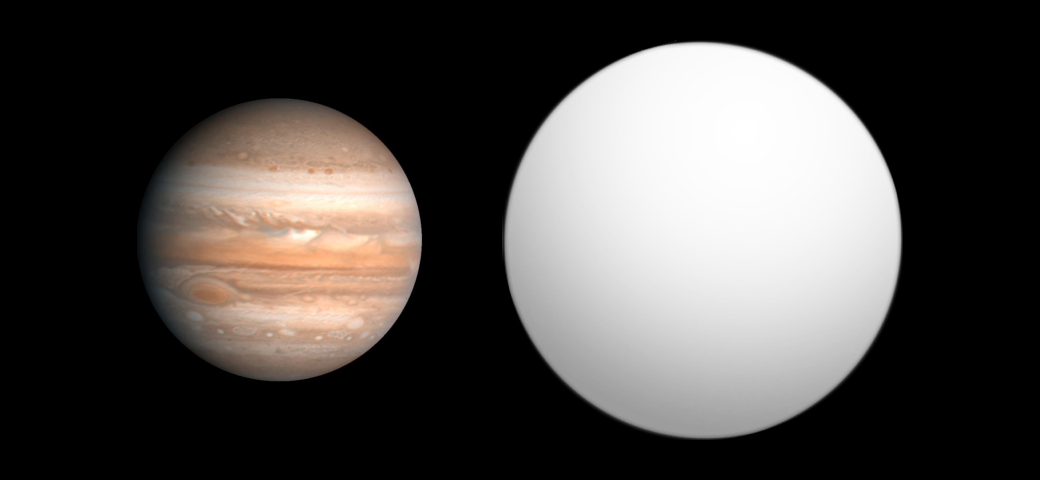
Size Comparison of HAT-P-9b with Jupiter
