= V352 Aurigae =

Star in the constellation Auriga

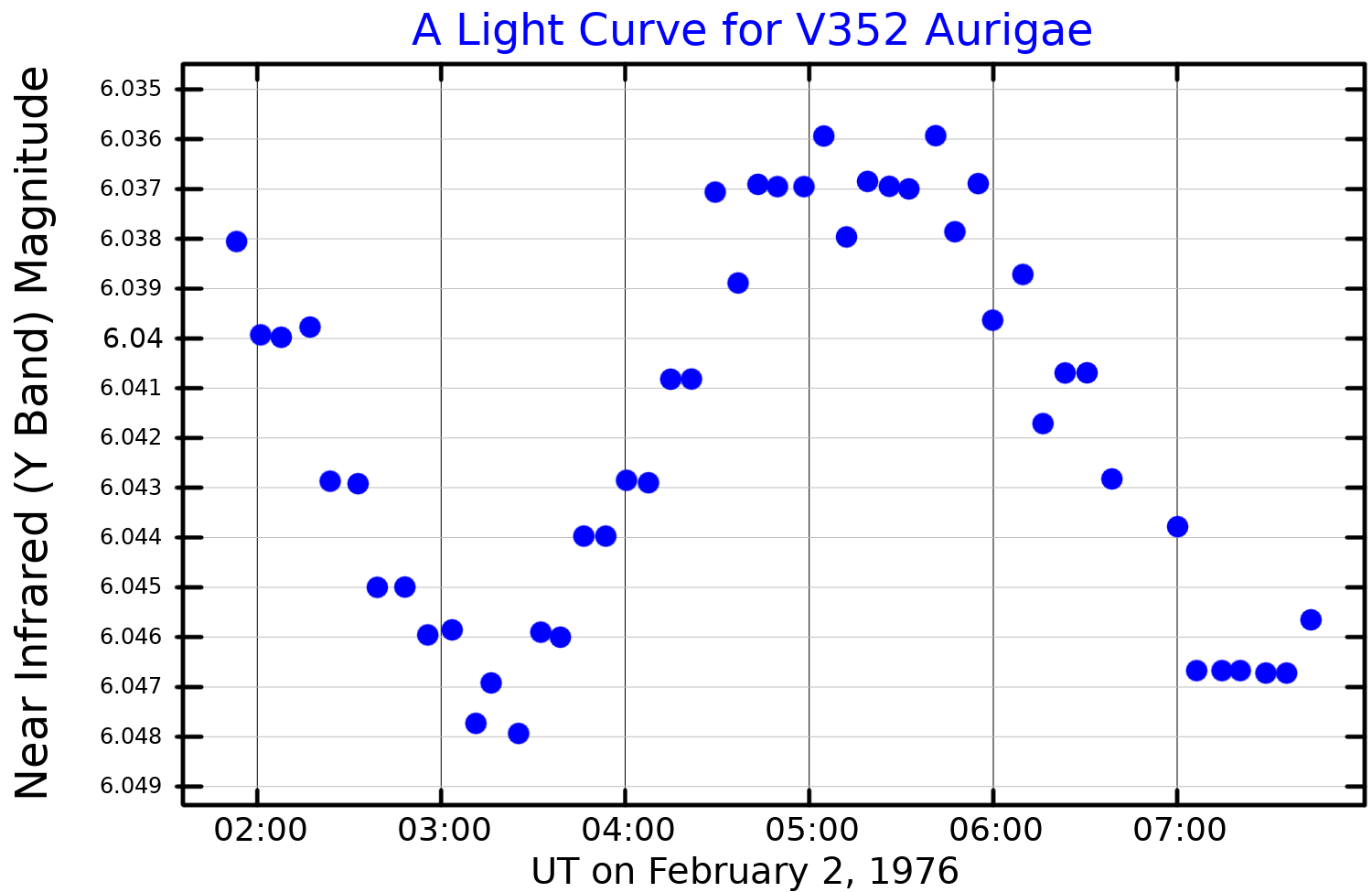
- A near infrared (Y band) light curve) for V352 Aurigae, adapted from Kurtz (1977)

Observation data Epoch J2000 Equinox ICRS
- Constellation: Auriga
- Right ascension: 06^{h} 55^{m} 14.65813^{s}
- Declination: +43° 54′ 36.1052″
- Apparent magnitude (V): 6.13 – 6.18

Characteristics
- Spectral type: A9III
- U−B color index: 0.21
- B−V color index: 0.314±0.015
- Variable type: δ Sct

Astrometry
Radial velocity (R_{v})	−7.0±2.9 km/s
Proper motion (μ)	RA: +1.795 mas/yr Dec.: −6.908 mas/yr
Parallax (π)	3.3542±0.0361 mas
Distance	970 ± 10 ly (298 ± 3 pc)
Absolute magnitude (M_{V})	−1.26

Details
Mass	1.57 M_{☉}
Radius	12.86+8.99 −2.03 R_{☉}
Luminosity	242.2±7.7 L_{☉}
Surface gravity (log g)	3.79 cgs
Temperature	6,350+568 −1,479 K
Metallicity [Fe/H]	0.00 dex
Rotational velocity (v sin i)	36 km/s
Age	998 Myr

Other designations
- V352 Aur, BD+44°1551, HD 50420, HIP 33269, HR 2557, SAO 41429

Database references
SIMBAD	data

V352 Aurigae is a variable star in the northern constellation of Auriga. It dimly visible to the naked eye with an apparent visual magnitude that ranges from 6.13 down to 6.18. According to the Bortle scale, it is faintly visible to the naked eye from dark rural skies. The star is located at a distance of approximately 970 light years from the Sun based on parallax, but is drifting closer with a radial velocity of −7 km/s.

The stellar classification of this star is A9III, which matches an A-type star with the luminosity class of an evolved giant star. It is listed as a spectral standard for stars of that class, although other researchers have classed it as F0II-III or F1IV.

In 1977, Donald W. Kurtz discovered that the star, then called HR 2557, is a variable star. It was given its variable star designation, V352 Aurigae, in 1981. V352 Aurigae is a low amplitude Delta Scuti variable with a period of 4.1 hours, which means the variability is caused by the rotation of the host star in combination with localized regions of activity. The star has 13 times the radius of the Sun and is radiating 242 times the Sun's luminosity from its photosphere at an effective temperature of 6,350 K. It is unusually luminous for a Delta Scuti variable. It is also suspected of being a chemically peculiar star of the Delta Delphini type, although the anomalies are not pronounced.
