= V420 Aurigae =

Star in the constellation Auriga

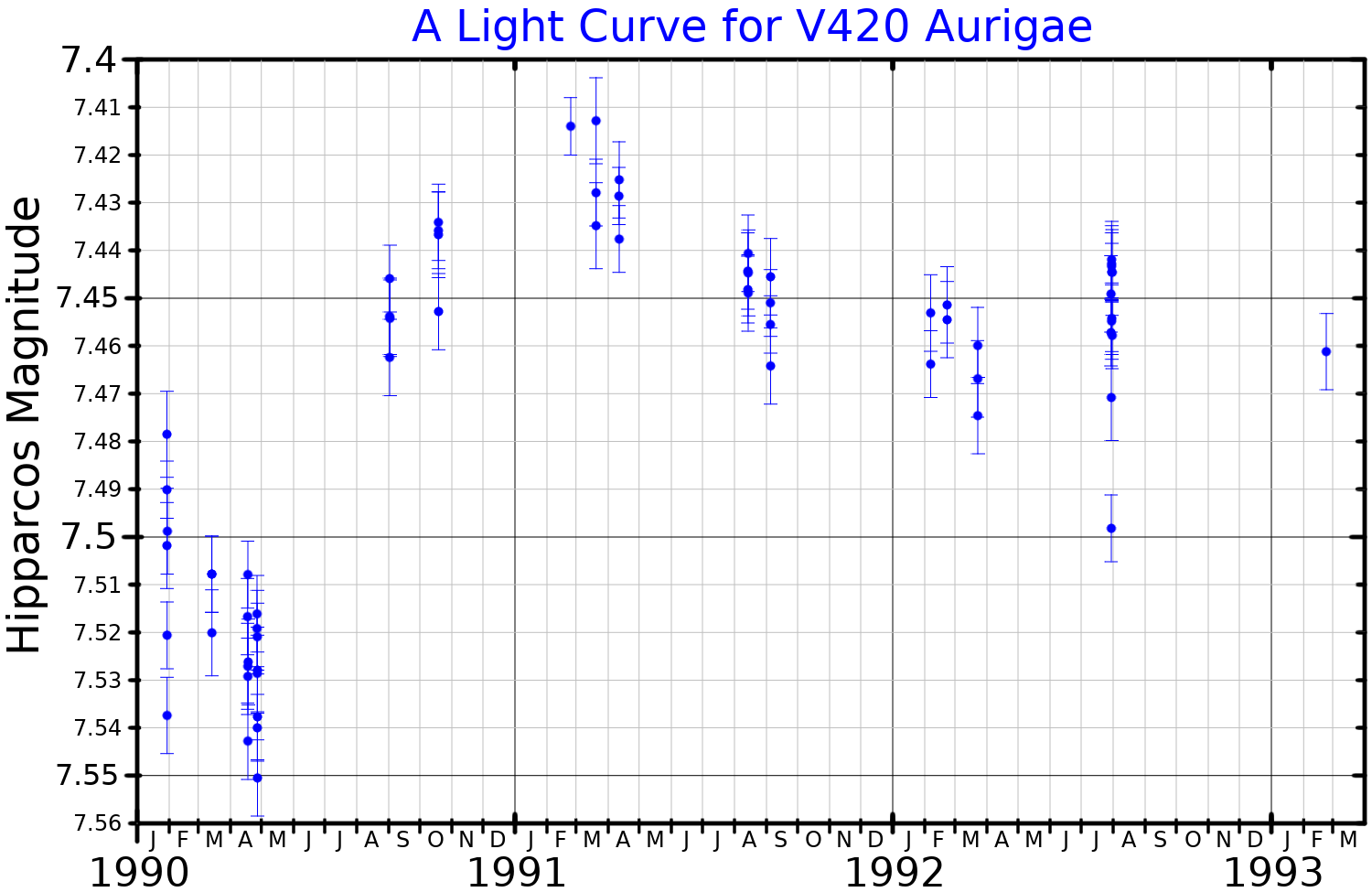
- A light curve for V420 Aurigae, plotted from Hipparcos data

Observation data Epoch J2000 Equinox ICRS
- Constellation: Auriga
- Right ascension: 05^{h} 22^{m} 35.23140^{s}
- Declination: +37° 40′ 33.6386″
- Apparent magnitude (V): 7.35 - 7.51

Characteristics
- Spectral type: B0IVpe
- U−B color index: −0.88
- B−V color index: +0.16
- Variable type: HMXB + γ Cas

Astrometry
Radial velocity (R_{v})	−20.5±4.4 km/s
Proper motion (μ)	RA: +1.305 mas/yr Dec.: −3.999 mas/yr
Parallax (π)	0.7214±0.0196 mas
Distance	4,500 ± 100 ly (1,390 ± 40 pc)

Details

HD 34921 A
Mass	17.5 M_{☉}
Radius	10.8 R_{☉}
Luminosity	1,673 L_{☉}
Surface gravity (log g)	3.5 cgs
Temperature	30,000 K
Metallicity [Fe/H]	−0.39 dex
Rotational velocity (v sin i)	240±4 km/s

Other designations
- V420 Aur, BD+37°1160, HD 34921, HIP 25114, SAO 57950 1H 0521+373

Database references
SIMBAD	data

V420 Aurigae is a high-mass star with an inferred compact companion. Closely orbiting each other every 0.8 days, they are a source of X-ray emission.

These coordinates were identified as an X-ray source using the Uhuru satellite in 1978, then associated with the star BD+37°1160 by Vito Francesco Polcaro and associates in 1990. The star was found to be a variable star in the visible part of the spectrum, from the Hipparcos data, and was given the variable star designation V420 Aurigae, in 1999.

The spectrum of the star shows rapid variation in the lines of singly-ionized iron and Balmer line emission, with these varying on a time scale of less than 300 seconds. This lends support to the presence of a compact companion. The system displays an infrared excess, suggesting it has an orbiting circumstellar envelope of gas and possibly dust. The system appears to be positioned at the center of an irregular, wispy nebula that was detected in the infrared band. One of the two filaments in this nebula appears to be connected with the system.
