= HD 34790 =

Binary star system in the constellation Auriga

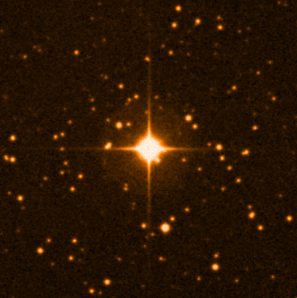
- The star

Observation data Epoch J2000 Equinox ICRS
- Constellation: Auriga
- Right ascension: 05^{h} 21^{m} 12.68743^{s}
- Declination: +29° 34′ 11.5927″
- Apparent magnitude (V): 5.66

Characteristics
- Spectral type: A1Vs
- U−B color index: +0.13
- B−V color index: +0.06

Astrometry
Radial velocity (R_{v})	−18.7±0.9 km/s
Proper motion (μ)	RA: −1.073 mas/yr Dec.: +0.880 mas/yr
Parallax (π)	10.2807±0.0695 mas
Distance	317 ± 2 ly (97.3 ± 0.7 pc)
Absolute magnitude (M_{V})	+0.93

Orbit
Period (P)	2.1517 d
Eccentricity (e)	0.0
Periastron epoch (T)	21140.396

Details

A
Mass	2.70 M_{☉}

B
Mass	2.35 M_{☉}

Other designations
- BD+29°869, HD 34790, HIP 25001, HR 1752, SAO 77124

Database references
SIMBAD	data

HD 34790 is a double-lined spectroscopic binary star system in the northern constellation of Auriga. It has a combined apparent magnitude of 5.66, which means it is faintly visible to the naked eye. Based upon observations by the Gaia space telescope, it is located around 317 light-years away. It has a combined stellar classification of A1Vs, matching that of an A-type main sequence star.

The two stars orbit each other with a period of only 2.15 days and an eccentricity of zero, indicating their orbit is close to circular. They are orbiting sufficiently close to each other that their rotation periods have most likely become tidally locked—meaning they always maintain the same face toward each other.

A faint third star 204″ away, shares a common proper motion and almost identical parallax. Any orbit is likely to take over a million years. The star is a faint red dwarf.
