= PU Aurigae =

Star in the constellation Auriga

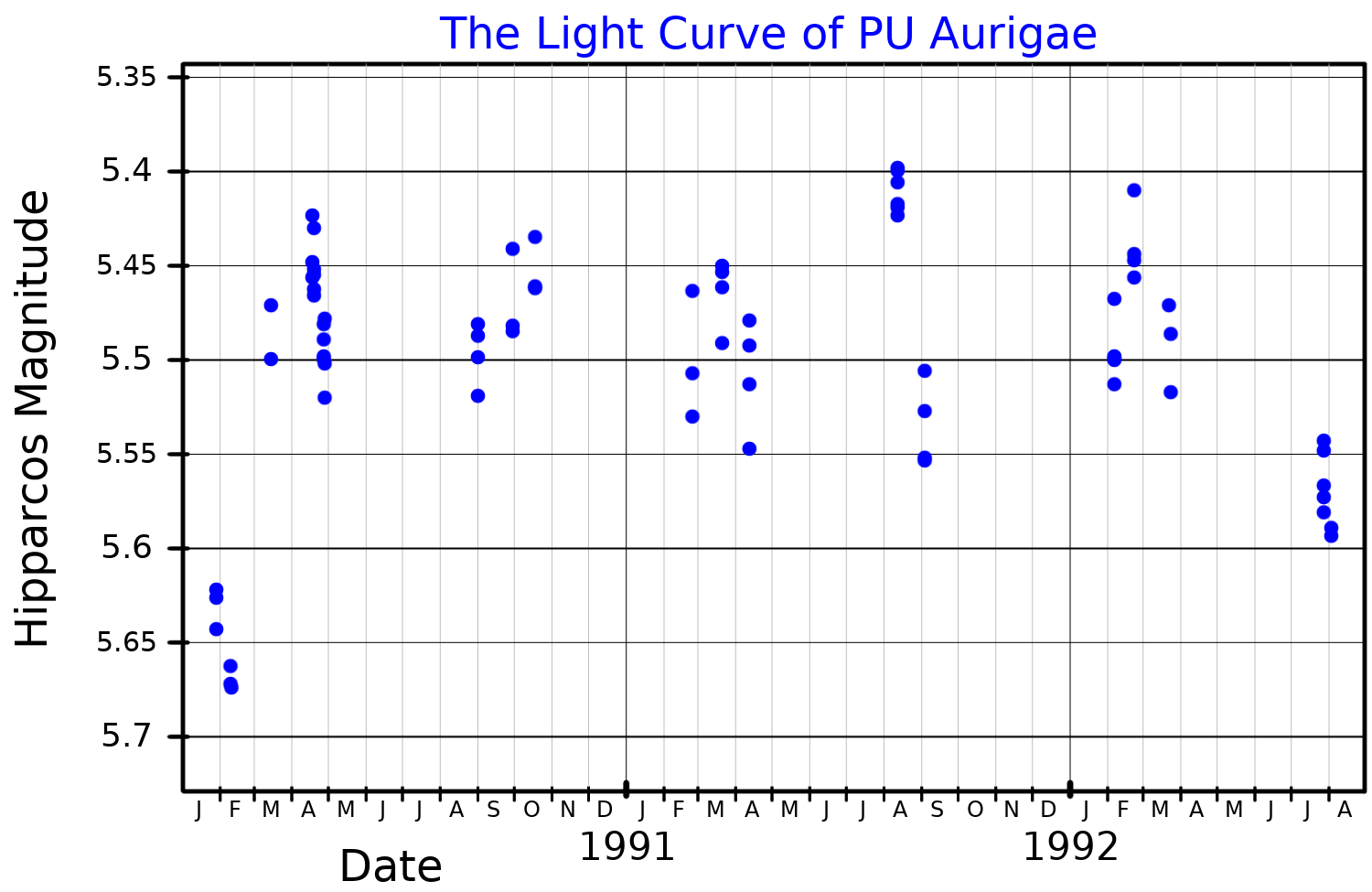
- A light curve for PU Aurigae, plotted from Hipparcos data

Observation data Epoch J2000 Equinox ICRS
- Constellation: Auriga
- Right ascension: 05^{h} 18^{m} 15.69723^{s}
- Declination: +42° 47′ 31.5967″
- Apparent magnitude (V): 5.55

Characteristics
- Spectral type: M4 III
- Apparent magnitude (G): 4.17
- B−V color index: 1.492±0.012
- Variable type: Lb

Astrometry
Radial velocity (R_{v})	−38.41±1.02 km/s
Proper motion (μ)	RA: +18.722±0.183 mas/yr Dec.: −30.380±0.144 mas/yr
Parallax (π)	5.4835±0.1650 mas
Distance	590 ± 20 ly (182 ± 5 pc)
Absolute magnitude (M_{V})	−0.63

Details
Radius	107 R_{☉}
Luminosity	1,523 L_{☉}
Temperature	3,482 K

Other designations
- PU Aurigae, BD+42° 1239, HD 34269, HIP 24738, HR 1722, SAO 40214, Gaia DR3 207274026495027712

Database references
SIMBAD	data

PU Aurigae is an irregular variable star located in the constellation Auriga. A red giant, it varies by 0.1 magnitude around magnitude 5.64, so it is faintly visible to the naked eye. Located around 590 light-years distant, it shines with a luminosity approximately 1,523 times that of the Sun and has a surface temperature of 3,482 K.

Although the star was first found to be variable by Joel Stebbins and Charles Morse Huffer in 1928, it was not given its variable star designation until 1977.
