= HAT-P-9 =

F-type star in the constellation Auriga

HAT-P-9 / Tevel
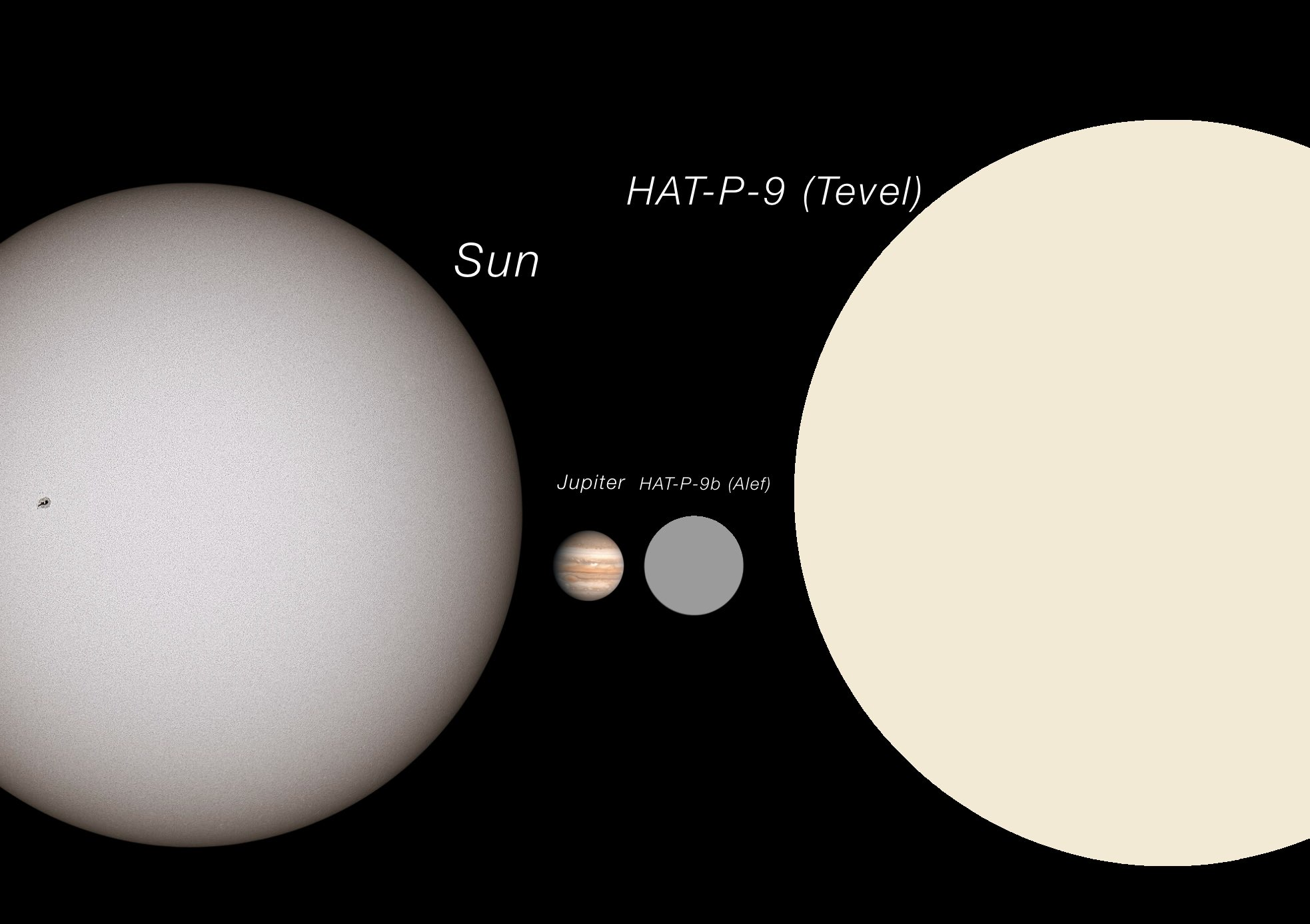
- The Size Comparison of HAT-P-9 System (Tevel).

Observation data Epoch J2000 Equinox ICRS
- Constellation: Auriga
- Right ascension: 07^{h} 20^{m} 40.4565^{s}
- Declination: +37° 08′ 26.343″
- Apparent magnitude (V): 12.34 ± 0.27

Characteristics
- Evolutionary stage: main sequence
- Spectral type: F
- Apparent magnitude (B): 12.35 ± 0.23
- Apparent magnitude (V): 12.34 ± 0.27
- Apparent magnitude (J): 11.274 ± 0.022
- Apparent magnitude (H): 11.04 ± 0.03
- Apparent magnitude (K): 11.015 ± 0.021
- Variable type: planetary transit

Astrometry
| Radial velocity (R_{v}) | 20.69±2.27 km/s |
| Proper motion (μ) | RA: −9.796 mas/yr Dec.: −13.029 mas/yr |
| Parallax (π) | 2.1626±0.0140 mas |
| Distance | 1,508 ± 10 ly (462 ± 3 pc) |

Details
| Mass | 1.281+0.057 −0.056 M_{☉} |
| Radius | 1.338+0.065 −0.060 R_{☉} |
| Luminosity | 2.62+0.26 −0.23 L_{☉} |
| Surface gravity (log g) | 4.293+0.033 −0.035 cgs |
| Temperature | 6253 ± 84 K |
| Metallicity [Fe/H] | 0.16 ± 0.09 dex |
| Rotational velocity (v sin i) | 13.4 ± 1.4 km/s |
| Age | 1.6^{+1.8}_{−1.4} Gyr |

Other designations
- Tevel, TOI-1731, TIC 371234684, TYC 2463-281-1, GSC 02463-00281, 2MASS J07204044+3708263, HAT-P-9

Database references
| SIMBAD | data |
| Exoplanet Archive | data |

HAT-P-9 is a magnitude 12 F-type star approximately 1500 light-years away in the constellation Auriga. A search for a binary companion star using adaptive optics at the MMT Observatory was negative.

== Naming ==
The star HAT-P-9 is named Tevel. The name was selected in the NameExoWorlds campaign by Israel, during the 100th anniversary of the IAU. The Hebrew word תֵבֵל tevel means "World" or "Universe".

== Planetary system ==
An exoplanet orbiting the star, HAT-P-9b, was discovered by the transit method on June 26, 2008. This is a low-density hot Jupiter, orbiting its star in just 3.9 days.

The HAT-P-9 planetary system
| Companion (in order from star) | Mass | Semimajor axis (AU) | Orbital period (days) | Eccentricity | Inclination (°) | Radius |
|---|---|---|---|---|---|---|
| b / Alef | 0.749+0.064 −0.063 M_{J} | 0.05287±0.00078 | 3.92281072(102) | 0.084+0.052 −0.047 | 86.44+0.37 −0.36 | 1.393+0.067 −0.065 R_{J} |

== See also ==
- HATNet Project or HAT
- List of extrasolar planets
