= HD 35520 =

Chemically peculiar star in the constellation Auriga

Observation data Epoch J2000 Equinox ICRS
- Constellation: Auriga
- Right ascension: 05^{h} 26^{m} 48.80361^{s}
- Declination: +34° 23′ 30.5047″
- Apparent magnitude (V): 5.92

Characteristics
- Spectral type: A1 III or A1p
- Apparent magnitude (G): 5.85
- B−V color index: 0.138±0.004

Astrometry
| Radial velocity (R_{v}) | +5.48±0.40 km/s |
| Proper motion (μ) | RA: +2.441±0.059 mas/yr Dec.: −6.702±0.038 mas/yr |
| Parallax (π) | 1.6110±0.0510 mas |
| Distance | 2,020 ± 60 ly (620 ± 20 pc) |

Details
| Mass | 2.9 M_{☉} |
| Radius | 23 R_{☉} |
| Luminosity | 2,686 L_{☉} |
| Surface gravity (log g) | 3.12 cgs |
| Temperature | 8,761 K |
| Rotational velocity (v sin i) | 80 km/s |

Other designations
- BD+34°1040, GC 6689, HD 35520, HIP 25471, HR 1795, SAO 58028

Database references
| SIMBAD | data |

HD 35520 is a single star in the northern constellation of Auriga. It has a white hue and is dimly visible to the naked eye with an apparent visual magnitude of 5.92. The distance to this star is approximately 2,020 light years based on parallax.

This is an Ap star, a type of chemically peculiar star, in the giant stage of its evolution, with a stellar classifications of A1 III and A1p. The spectrum displays abundance anomalies of helium and silicon. It has been classed as a shell star and has a relatively high projected rotational velocity for its class of 80 km/s. The star has expanded to 23 times the radius of the Sun and it is radiating 2,686 times the Sun's luminosity from its enlarged photosphere at an effective temperature of 8,761 K.
