= HD 49674 b =

Exoplanet in the constellation Auriga

HD 49674 b / Eburonia
Discovery
- Discovered by: Butler, Marcy, Vogt et al. Department of Astronomy, 601 Campbell Hall, University of California, Berkeley, California (United States)
- Discovery site: exoplanets.org
- Discovery date: June 13, 2002
- Detection method: Radial velocity

Orbital characteristics
- Apastron: 0.0630 AU (9,420,000 km)
- Periastron: 0.0530 AU (7,930,000 km)
- Semi-major axis: 0.0580 ± 0.0034 AU (8,680,000 ± 510,000 km)
- Eccentricity: 0.087±0.095
- Orbital period (sidereal): 4.94737±0.00098 d
- Average orbital speed: 128
- Time of periastron: 2,451,882.38±0.88
- Argument of periastron: 264
- Semi-amplitude: 13.7±0.21
- Star: HD 49674

HD 49674 b, formally named Eburonia, is an extrasolar planet located approximately 134 light-years away in the constellation of Auriga, orbiting the star HD 49674. It was discovered orbiting the star in 2002. The planet is a gas giant and orbits extremely close to its star, which takes only 4.95 days to revolve.

HD 49674 b, along with its parent star, was chosen as part of the 2019 NameExoWorlds campaign organised by the International Astronomical Union in which each country was assigned a star and planet to be named. The HD 49674 system was assigned to Belgium. The winning proposal named HD 49674 b Eburonia and the parent star Nervia, both after prominent Belgic tribes, the Eburones and Nervii respectively.
