= 22 Aurigae =

Star in the constellation Auriga

Observation data Epoch J2000 Equinox J2000
- Constellation: Auriga
- Right ascension: 05^{h} 23^{m} 22.87257^{s}
- Declination: +28° 56′ 12.6811″
- Apparent magnitude (V): 6.45

Characteristics
- Evolutionary stage: main sequence
- Spectral type: B9 Vs
- Apparent magnitude (G): 6.44
- B−V color index: −0.040±0.008

Astrometry
Radial velocity (R_{v})	+9.6±2.7 km/s
Proper motion (μ)	RA: +16.181±0.047 mas/yr Dec.: −32.063±0.034 mas/yr
Parallax (π)	6.2516±0.0437 mas
Distance	522 ± 4 ly (160 ± 1 pc)
Absolute magnitude (M_{V})	0.41

Details
Mass	2.85±0.08 M_{☉}
Radius	3.1 R_{☉}
Luminosity	89.7+15.5 −10.1 L_{☉}
Temperature	10,764+140 −49 K
Rotational velocity (v sin i)	66 km/s

Other designations
- 22 Aur, BD+28°788, Gaia DR3 3445649302903509760, HD 35076, HIP 25192, HR 1768, SAO 77139

Database references
SIMBAD	data

22 Aurigae is a star located 522 light years away from the Sun in the northern constellation Auriga. It is just bright enough to be barely visible to the naked eye under good viewing conditions, appearing as a blue-white hued star with an apparent visual magnitude of 6.45. At the distance of this object, the brightness is diminished by an extinction of 0.57 due to interstellar dust. The star is moving further from the Earth with a heliocentric radial velocity of +10 km/s, and it is a member of the Taurion OB association, located between Orion and Taurus.

This object is a B-type main-sequence star with a stellar classification of B9 Vs. The 's' notation indicates the spectrum appears "sharp"-lined, due to its relatively moderate projected rotational velocity of 66 km/s. It has 2.9 times the mass of the Sun and about 3.1 times the Sun's radius. The star is radiating 90 times the luminosity of the Sun from its photosphere at an effective temperature of 10,764 K.
