= IQ Aurigae =

Star in the constellation Auriga

- Location of IQ Aurigae (circled in red)

Observation data Epoch J2000 Equinox ICRS
- Constellation: Auriga
- Right ascension: 05^{h} 19^{m} 00.02846^{s}
- Declination: +33° 44′ 54.2208″
- Apparent magnitude (V): 5.38

Characteristics
- Evolutionary stage: main sequence
- Spectral type: A0pSi
- U−B color index: −0.62
- B−V color index: −0.167±0.004
- Variable type: α^{2} CVn

Astrometry
Radial velocity (R_{v})	+28.6 km/s
Proper motion (μ)	RA: +13.573 mas/yr Dec.: −29.028 mas/yr
Parallax (π)	7.0526±0.1065 mas
Distance	462 ± 7 ly (142 ± 2 pc)
Absolute magnitude (M_{V})	−0.42

Details
Mass	3.95±0.21 M_{☉}
Radius	2.6±0.4 R_{☉}
Luminosity	263 L_{☉}
Surface gravity (log g)	4.34±0.12 cgs
Temperature	14,454 K
Metallicity [Fe/H]	1.70 dex
Rotation	2.4660 days
Rotational velocity (v sin i)	49 km/s
Age	6.3 Myr

Other designations
- IQ Aur, AAVSO 0512+33, BD+33°1008, HD 34452, HIP 24799, HR 1732, SAO 57884

Database references
SIMBAD	data

IQ Aurigae is a (most likely) single, variable star in the northern constellation of Auriga. It is visible to the naked eye as a dim, white-hued star with an apparent visual magnitude that fluctuates around 5.38. The star is located at a distance of about 460 light-years from the Sun based on parallax and is drifting further away with a radial velocity of +28.6 km/s.

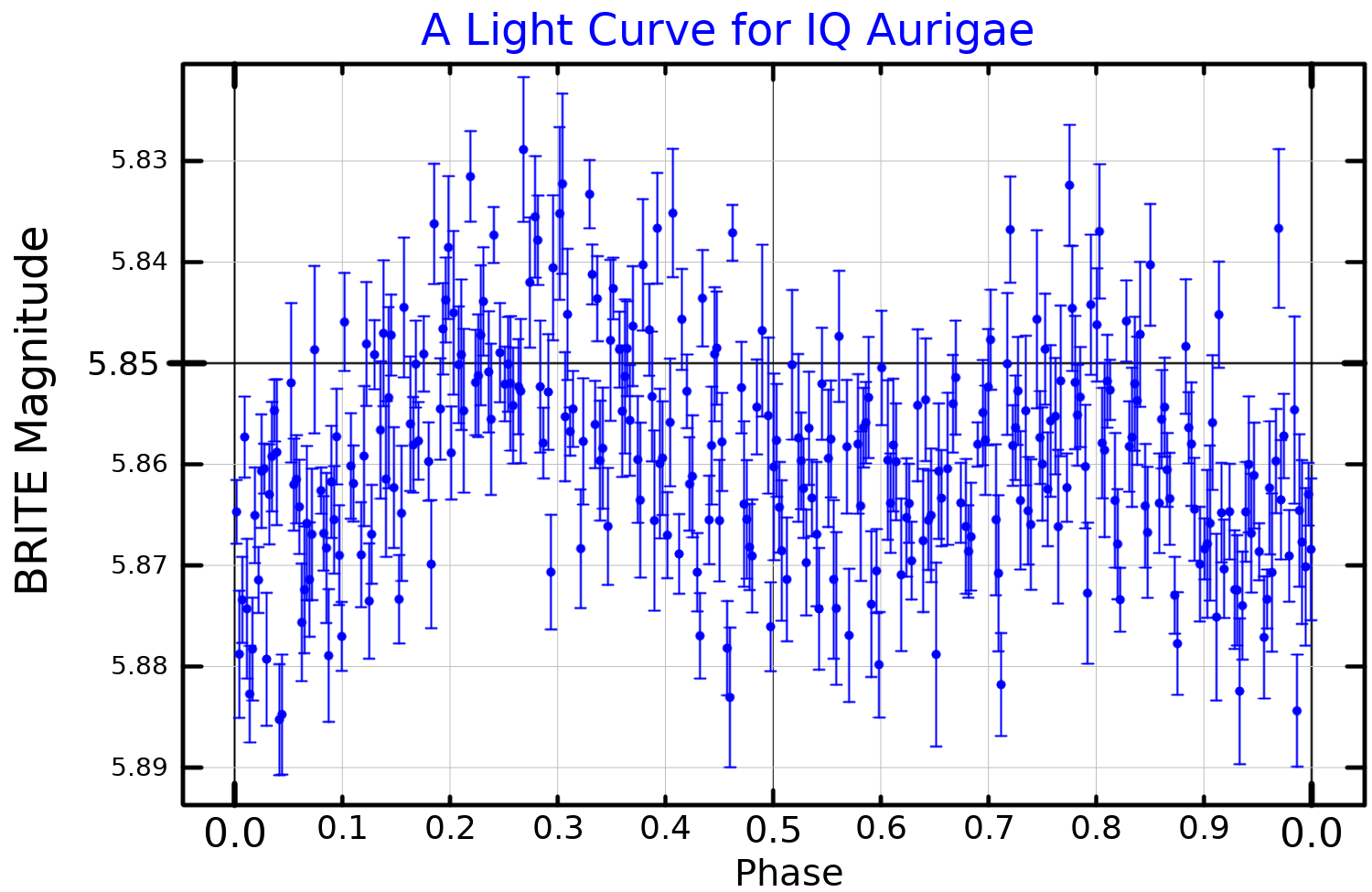
A light curve for IQ Aurigae from BRITE nanosatellites. Plotted from data published by Strassmeier et al. (2020), assuming a period of 2.463 days.

In 1953, Sanford S Provin reported that the star, referred to at that time as HD 34452, showed indications of being a variable star, but the evidence was inconclusive. Karl D. Rakos confirmed that the star is variable in 1962.

This is a magnetic Ap star with a stellar classification of A0pSi. It is known as a silicon star, having a strong line of singly ionized silicon, and may also be helium deficient as the lines of helium are weaker than expected. The star is an Alpha^{2} Canum Venaticorum-type variable, ranging in magnitude from 5.35 down to 5.43 with a rotationally-modulated period of 2.4660 days. It is an X-ray source with a high luminosity of 4×10^{29} erg s^{−1}, which may be caused by a combination of shocks in the stellar wind and magnetic reconnection occurring well above the stellar surface. The star has been observed to flare, during which the X-ray emission rose to 3.2×10^{31} erg s^{−1}.

IQ Aurigae is 6.3 million years old and is spinning with a projected rotational velocity of 49 km/s, giving it a rotation period of 2.47 days. It has nearly four times the mass of the Sun and 2.6 times the Sun's radius. The star is radiating 263 times the luminosity of the Sun from its active photosphere at an effective temperature of 14,454 K.
