= 59 Aurigae =

Star in the constellation Auriga

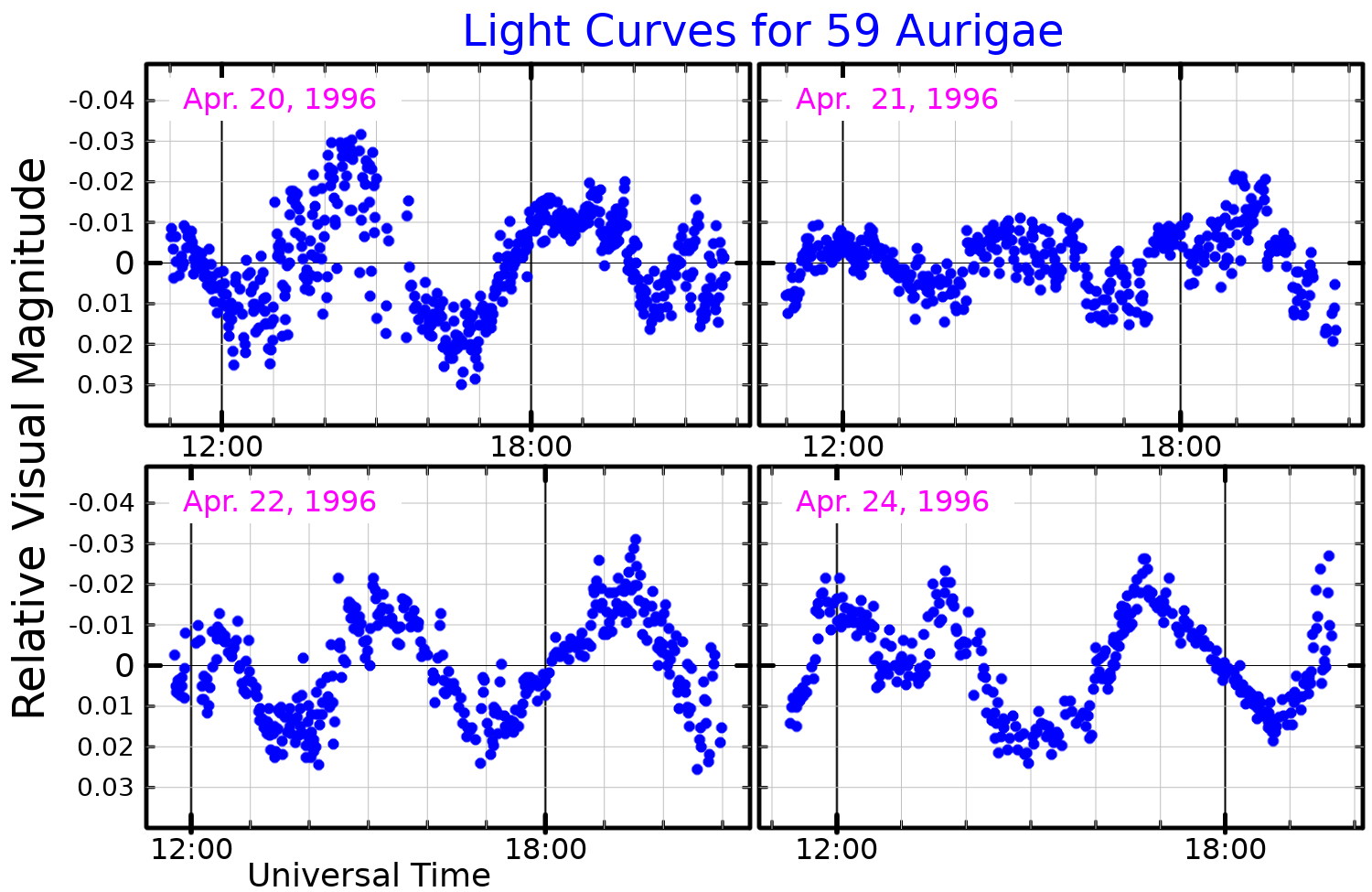
- Four visual band light curves for 59 Aurigae, adapted from Zhiping (2000)

Observation data Epoch J2000 Equinox ICRS
- Constellation: Auriga
- Right ascension: 06^{h} 53^{m} 01.41097^{s}
- Declination: +38° 52′ 08.9322″
- Apparent magnitude (V): 6.099

Characteristics
- Evolutionary stage: subgiant
- Spectral type: F2V
- U−B color index: +0.14
- B−V color index: +0.38
- Variable type: δ Sct

Astrometry
Radial velocity (R_{v})	1.0±4.3 km/s
Proper motion (μ)	RA: −3.916 mas/yr Dec.: +6.659 mas/yr
Parallax (π)	6.7702±0.0476 mas
Distance	482 ± 3 ly (148 ± 1 pc)
Absolute magnitude (M_{V})	0.23±0.12

Details
Mass	2.37 M_{☉}
Radius	5.7 R_{☉}
Luminosity	62 L_{☉}
Surface gravity (log g)	3.23 cgs
Temperature	6,848 K
Metallicity [Fe/H]	0.18 dex
Rotational velocity (v sin i)	165 km/s
Age	530 Myr

Other designations
- 59 Aur, OX Aur, BD+39°1771, GC 8993, HD 50018, HIP 33041, HR 2539, SAO 59571, PPM 72197, ADS 5534, CCDM J06530+3852, WDS J06530+3852, TYC 2942-2005-1, GSC 02942-02005

Database references
SIMBAD	data

59 Aurigae, often abbreviated as 59 Aur, is a star in the constellation Auriga. Its baseline apparent magnitude is 6.1, meaning it can just barely be seen with the naked eye as a dim, yellow-white hued star. Based on parallax measurements, it is located about 482 light-years (148 parsecs) away from the Sun.

In 1966, Ivan John Danziger and Robert John Dickens discovered that 59 Aurigae star is a variable star. This object is a Delta Scuti variable, meaning it varies in luminosity due to pulsations on its surface, ranging in magnitude from 5.94 down to 6.14 with a period of 0.154412 days (3.7 h). For that reason, in 1975, it was given the variable star designation OX Aurigae. The star's spectrum matches that of an F-type main-sequence star and it has a spectral type of F2V. It has 2.4 times the mass of the Sun and 5.7 times the Sun's radius. 59 Aurigae is thought to be around 530 million years old, and is radiating 62 times the Sun's luminosity from its photosphere an effective temperature of 6,848 K.
