= Phi Aurigae =

Star in the constellation Auriga

φ Aurigae
- Location of φ Aurigae (circled)

Observation data Epoch J2000 Equinox J2000
- Constellation: Auriga
- Right ascension: 05^{h} 27^{m} 38.884^{s}
- Declination: +34° 28′ 33.17″
- Apparent magnitude (V): 5.089

Characteristics
- Spectral type: K3 IIIp
- U−B color index: +1.649
- B−V color index: +1.411
- R−I color index: 0.47

Astrometry
Radial velocity (R_{v})	+30.78±0.21 km/s
Proper motion (μ)	RA: −1.050 mas/yr Dec.: −38.934 mas/yr
Parallax (π)	6.4359±0.1095 mas
Distance	507 ± 9 ly (155 ± 3 pc)
Absolute magnitude (M_{V})	−0.62

Details
Radius	33.97±1.05 R_{☉}
Luminosity	307±15 L_{☉}
Surface gravity (log g)	1.75 cgs
Temperature	4,222 K
Metallicity [Fe/H]	−0.03 dex
Rotational velocity (v sin i)	1.6 km/s

Other designations
- φ Aur, 24 Aurigae, BD+34 1048, HD 35620, HIP 25541, HR 1805, SAO 58051

Database references
SIMBAD	data

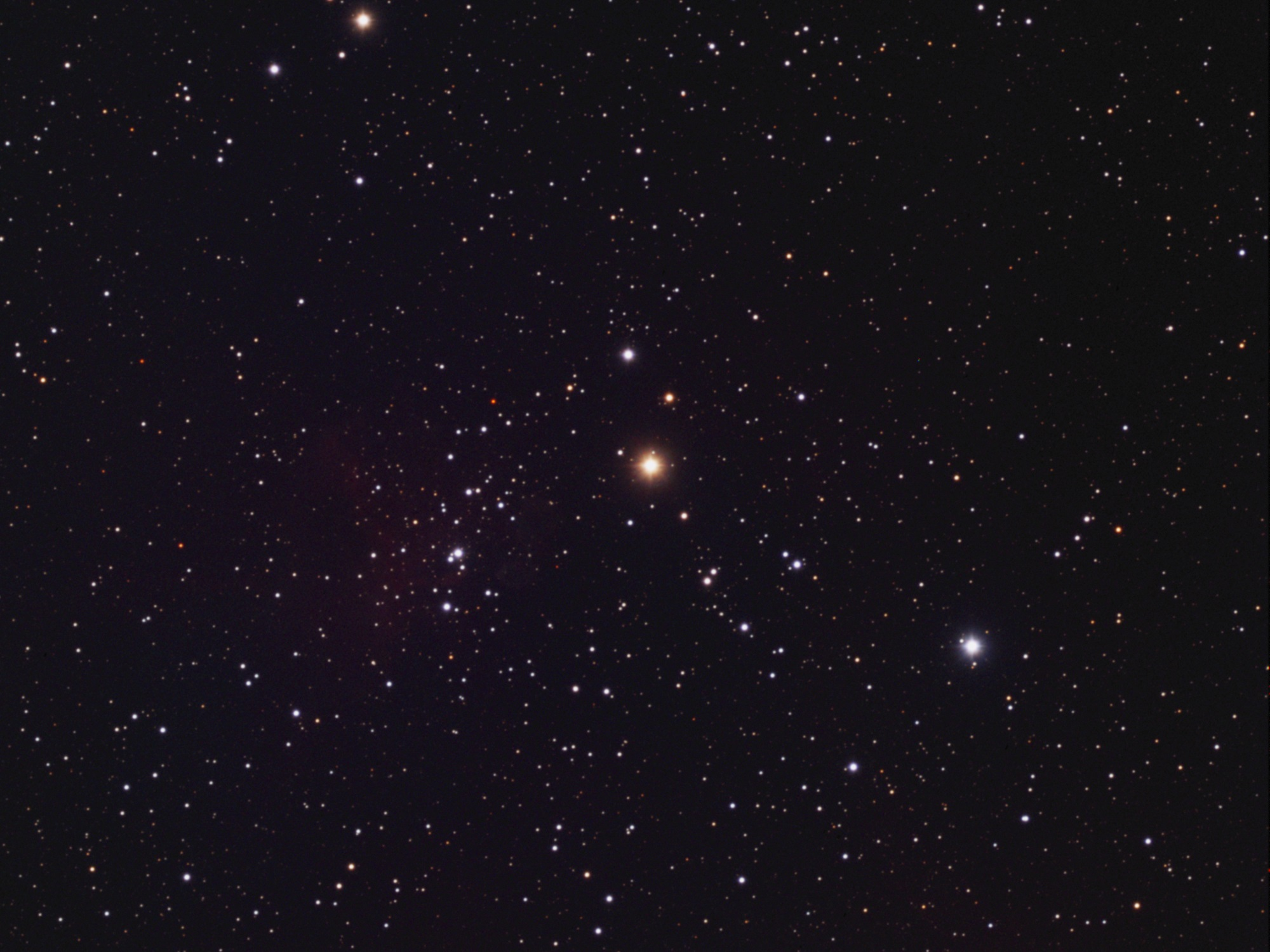
φ Aurigae in optical light

Phi Aurigae is a giant star in the northern constellation of Auriga. Its name is a Bayer designation that is Latinized from φ Aurigae, and abbreviated Phi Aur or φ Aur. This star is faintly visible to the naked eye with an apparent visual magnitude of 5.089. It lies 10′ from another faint naked-eye star HD 35520, between the three open clusters M36 and M38, and NGC 1893.

The distance to this star, as determined from parallax measurements, is approximately 507 light-years (155 parsecs) with a 9 light-year margin of error. It is drifting further away from the Sun with a radial velocity of +31 km/s.

This is an evolved giant star with a stellar classification of K3 IIIp. Having exhausted the supply of hydrogen at its core, it has expanded to 34 times the radius of the Sun. It is radiating over 300 times the luminosity of the Sun from its enlarged photosphere at an effective temperature of 4,222 K, giving it the cool orange-hued glow of a K-type star.
