= HD 45350 =

Star in the constellation Auriga

HD 45350 / Lucilinburhuc
Observation data Epoch J2000.0 Equinox J2000.0 (ICRS)
- Constellation: Auriga
- Right ascension: 06^{h} 28^{m} 45.71108^{s}
- Declination: +38° 57′ 46.6665″
- Apparent magnitude (V): 7.89

Characteristics
- Evolutionary stage: subgiant
- Spectral type: G5 V or K0III
- B−V color index: 0.740±0.015

Astrometry
Radial velocity (R_{v})	−20.82±0.13 km/s
Proper motion (μ)	RA: −42.748 mas/yr Dec.: −53.736 mas/yr
Parallax (π)	21.2910±0.0285 mas
Distance	153.2 ± 0.2 ly (46.97 ± 0.06 pc)
Absolute magnitude (M_{V})	4.45

Details
Mass	1.06±0.01 M_{☉}
Radius	1.24±0.02 R_{☉}
Luminosity	1.43±0.02 L_{☉}
Surface gravity (log g)	4.27±0.02 cgs
Temperature	5,683±35 K
Metallicity [Fe/H]	0.23 dex
Rotational velocity (v sin i)	4.7 km/s
Age	7.1±0.9 Gyr; 6.31 Gyr

Other designations
- Lucilinburhuc, BD+39°1637, HD 45350, HIP 30860, SAO 591265, PPM 71672, TYC 2927-323-1, GSC 02927-00323

Database references
SIMBAD	data
Exoplanet Archive	data

HD 45350 is a solar analog star with an exoplanetary companion in the northern constellation of Auriga. It has an apparent visual magnitude of 7.89, which means it is an 8th magnitude star that is too dim to be readily visible to the naked eye. The system is located at a distance of 153 light-years from the Sun based on parallax measurements, but is drifting closer with a radial velocity of −21 km/s.

== Description ==
HD 45350 is a G-type star with a stellar classification of G5 V or K0III. Age estimates are in the range of 6–7 billion years and it has an absolute magnitude of 4.45, placing it about 0.8 magnitudes above the main sequence. The star is chromospherically quiet but metal-rich with a projected rotational velocity of 4.7 km/s. The mass of the star is about the same as the Sun, but it is 24% larger in radius and is a radiating 43% higher luminosity.

The star HD 45350 is named Lucilinburhuc. The name was selected in the NameExoWorlds campaign by Luxembourg, during the 100th anniversary of the IAU. The Lucilinburhuc fortress was built in 963 by the founder of Luxembourg, Count Siegfried. The year 2019-2020 class of 3B from the Luxembourgish Echternach high school won the contest to name both the star and its planet.

== Planetary system ==
In January 2005, the discovery of a very eccentric extrasolar planet orbiting the star was announced by the California and Carnegie Planet Search team.

The HD 45350 planetary system
Companion (in order from star)	Mass	Semimajor axis (AU)	Orbital period (days)	Eccentricity	Inclination (°)	Radius
b / Peitruss	>1.79±0.14 M_{J}	1.92±0.067	963.6±3.4	0.778±0.009	—	—

== See also ==
- List of extrasolar planets
