= IU Aurigae =

Triple star system in the constellation Auriga

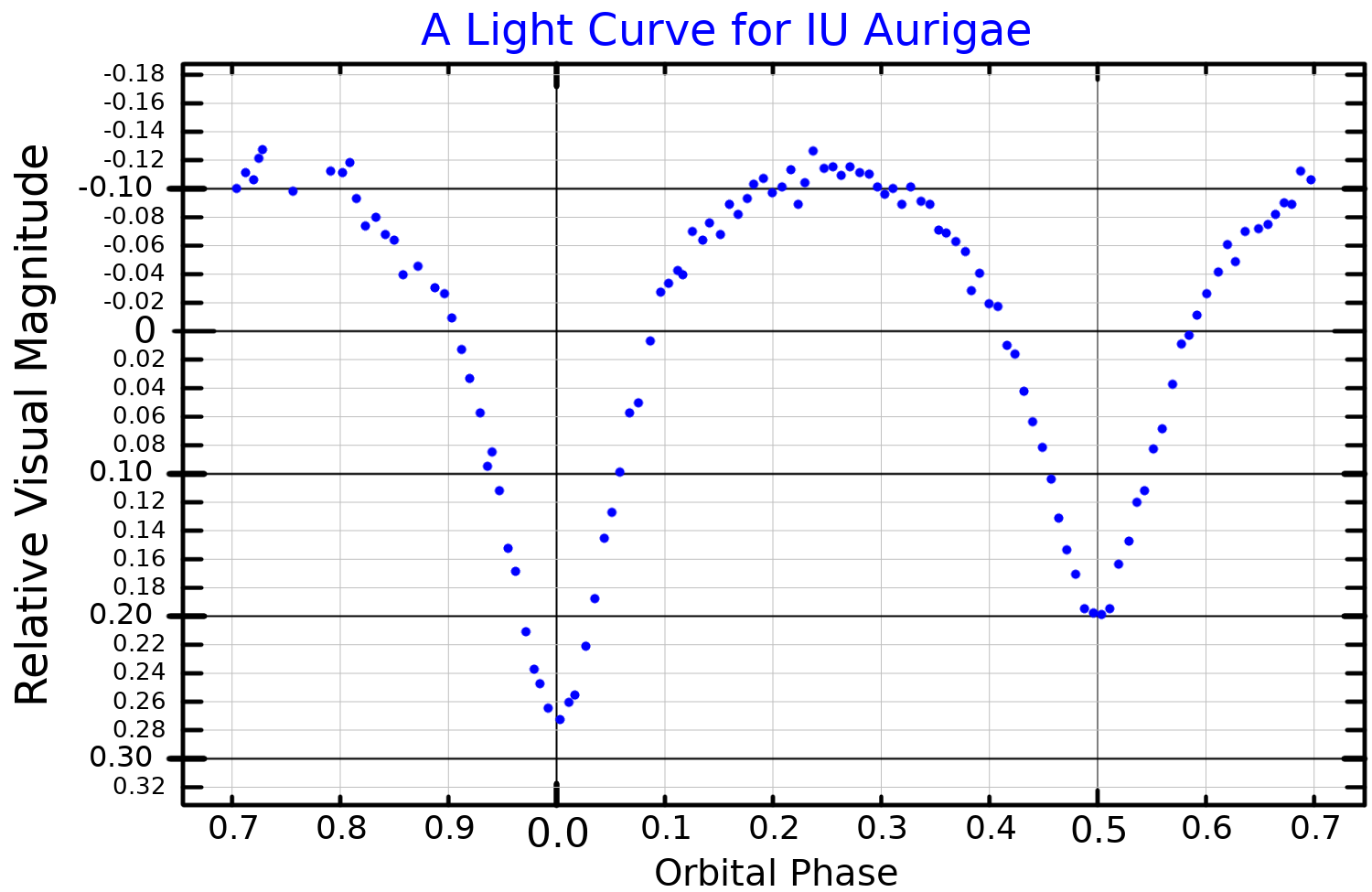
- A visual band light curve for IU Aurigae, adapted from Özdemir et al. (2003)

Observation data Epoch J2000 Equinox ICRS
- Constellation: Auriga
- Right ascension: 05^{h} 27^{m} 52.40539^{s}
- Declination: +34° 46′ 58.3435″
- Apparent magnitude (V): 8.19 to 8.83

Characteristics
- Spectral type: B0p + B1Vp + ?
- U−B color index: −0.66
- B−V color index: +0.18
- Variable type: Eclipsing binary

Astrometry
Radial velocity (R_{v})	9±5 km/s
Proper motion (μ)	RA: −4.479 mas/yr Dec.: −9.049 mas/yr
Parallax (π)	0.4786±0.5765 mas
Distance	6,500 ly (2,000 pc)

Details

A
Mass	21.4±2.5 M_{☉}
Radius	7.8±0.8 R_{☉}
Luminosity	57,500 L_{☉}
Surface gravity (log g)	3.99±0.17 cgs
Temperature	32,000 K

B
Mass	14.5±2.0 M_{☉}
Radius	7.1±0.8 R_{☉}
Luminosity	26,300 L_{☉}
Surface gravity (log g)	3.89±0.19 cgs
Temperature	27,540±290 K

Other designations
- IU Aur, BD+34°1051, HD 35652, HIP 25565, SAO 58059, PPM 70395

Database references
SIMBAD	data

IU Aurigae is a triple star system in the constellation Auriga, consisting of an eclipsing binary pair orbiting a third component with a period of 335 years. This system is too faint to be viewed with the naked eye, having a peak apparent visual magnitude of 8.19.

Pavel Mayer discovered that the star's brightness varies in 1964. The eclipsing pair form a Beta Lyrae-type semidetached binary of two Bp stars with a period of 1.81147435 days. During the primary eclipse, the visual magnitude of the system drops to 8.89, while for the secondary it decreases to 8.74. The third component is a massive object with 17–18 M_{☉}, and may actually be a binary – which would make this a quadruple star system.
