= Aurigids =

Meteor shower

- Celestial map of Auriga
- Parent body: Kiess (C/1911 N1)

Radiant
- Constellation: Auriga
- Right ascension: 6^{h} 4^{m} -0^{s}
- Declination: +39° 00′ 00″

Properties
- Occurs during: August 26 to September 5
- Date of peak: September 1
- Velocity: 65 km/s
- Zenithal hourly rate: 6

Aurigids is a meteor shower occurring primarily within September.

The comet Kiess (C/1911 N1) whose orbital period is approximately 2000 to 2100 years, is the source of the material that causes the meteors.

== Alpha ==
The Alpha Aurigids were discovered by C. Hoffmeister and A. Teichgraeber, during the night of 31 August 1935. Alpha Aurigids have been observed in the years 1935, '86, '94 and 2007 .

== See also ==
- Carl Clarence Kiess
- Delta Aurigids
- List of meteor showers

== Sources ==
- aurigid.seti 16:35 11.10.11
