= NGC 2387 =

Spiral galaxy in the constellation Auriga

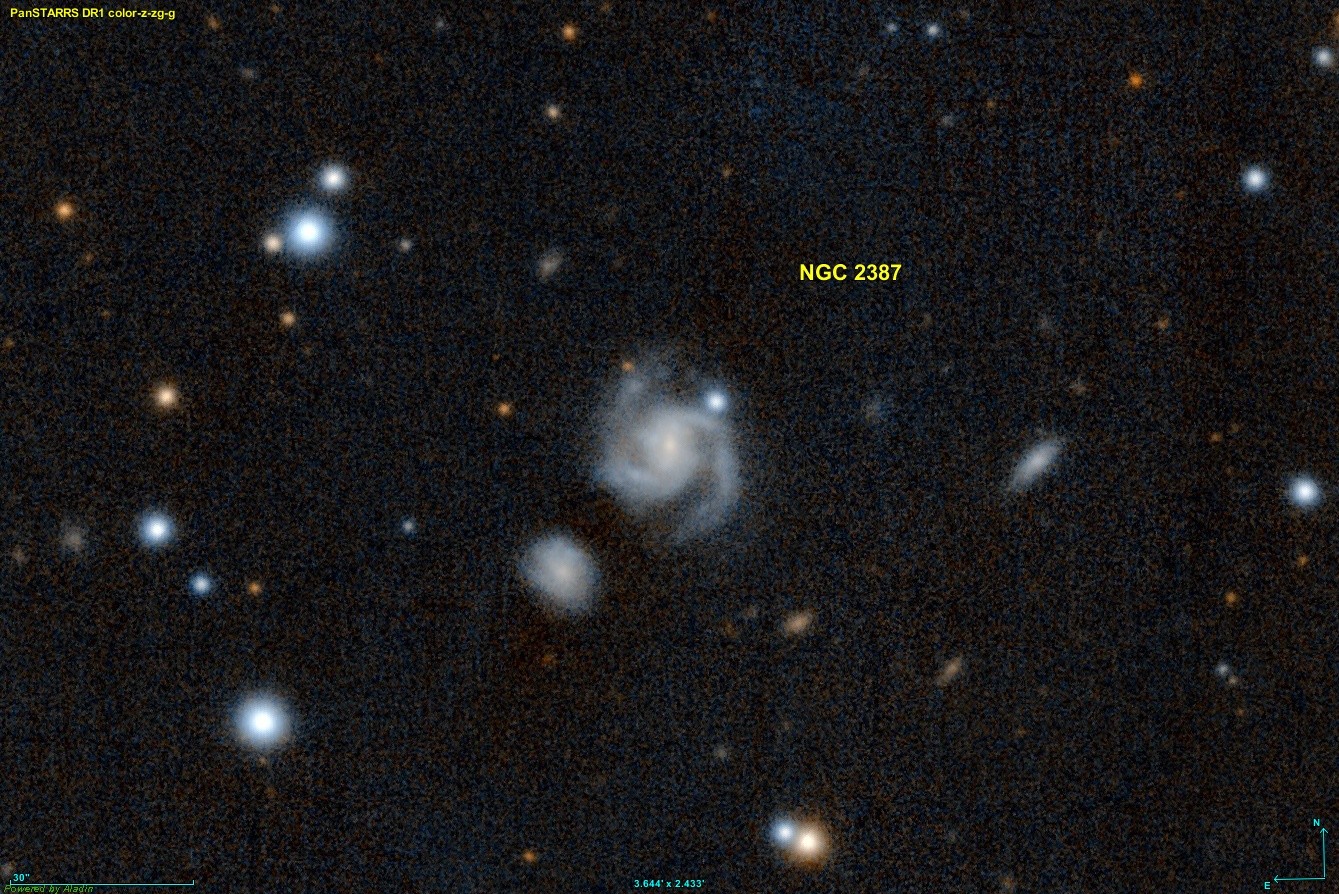

Observation data (J2000 epoch)
- Constellation: Auriga
- Right ascension: 07^{h} 28^{m} 58.5300^{s}
- Declination: +36° 52′ 35.200″
- Redshift: 0.066793±0.000077
- Apparent magnitude (V): 16.5

Other designations
- CGCG 177-023 CGCG 0725.6+3658 NVSS J072858+365235 PGC021105

NGC 2387 is a spiral galaxy in constellation Auriga. It was discovered on March 10, 1790, by William Herschel.
