= HD 39225 =

Star in the constellation Auriga

Observation data Epoch J2000 Equinox ICRS
- Constellation: Auriga
- Right ascension: 05^{h} 52^{m} 40.09301^{s}
- Declination: +33° 55′ 02.8663″
- Apparent magnitude (V): 5.82–6.07

Characteristics
- Evolutionary stage: AGB
- Spectral type: M1+III Fe-1
- U−B color index: 1.97
- B−V color index: 1.579±0.021
- Variable type: suspected

Astrometry
| Radial velocity (R_{v}) | 99.39±0.61 km/s |
| Proper motion (μ) | RA: +17.953 mas/yr Dec.: +9.174 mas/yr |
| Parallax (π) | 4.9537±0.0893 mas |
| Distance | 660 ± 10 ly (202 ± 4 pc) |
| Absolute magnitude (M_{V}) | −0.77 |

Details
| Mass | 3.7 M_{☉} |
| Radius | 51 R_{☉} |
| Luminosity | 411 L_{☉} |
| Surface gravity (log g) | 1.61 cgs |
| Temperature | 3,643 K |
| Age | 865 Myr |

Other designations
- NSV 2681, BD+33°1179, HD 39225, HIP 27778, HR 2028, SAO 58528, GSC 02414-00524

Database references
| SIMBAD | data |

HD 39225, also known as HR 2028, is a variable star in the northern constellation Auriga, located around 660 light years away from the Sun. It is visible to the naked eye as a faint, red-hued star with an apparent visual magnitude of around 6. This is a suspected runaway star that is moving away from the Sun with a heliocentric radial velocity of 99 km/s.

Currently on the asymptotic giant branch, this is an evolved red giant star with a stellar classification of M1+III Fe-1. The suffix notation indicates an underabundance of iron in the stellar atmosphere compared to similar stars of its class. It is suspected of varying in brightness between magnitudes 5.82 and 6.07. Having exhausted the hydrogen at its core, it has expanded to around 51 times the Sun's radius. It shines with a luminosity approximately 411 times that of the Sun and has a surface temperature of 3,643 K.
