= HD 37646 =

Double star in the constellation Auriga

Observation data Epoch J2000 Equinox ICRS
- Constellation: Auriga
- Right ascension: 05^{h} 41^{m} 20.97674^{s}
- Declination: +29° 29′ 14.6967″
- Apparent magnitude (V): 6.43

Characteristics
- Evolutionary stage: main sequence
- Spectral type: B8IV
- Apparent magnitude (G): 6.39
- U−B color index: −0.39
- B−V color index: −0.11
- Variable type: eclipsing binary

Astrometry
Radial velocity (R_{v})	18.00±4.3 km/s
Proper motion (μ)	RA: +15.145±0.068 mas/yr Dec.: −26.656±0.041 mas/yr
Parallax (π)	6.3659±0.0675 mas
Distance	512 ± 5 ly (157 ± 2 pc)
Absolute magnitude (M_{V})	+0.11

Details
Mass	3.43 M_{☉}
Radius	2.21 R_{☉}
Luminosity	177 L_{☉}
Surface gravity (log g)	4.35 cgs
Temperature	12,589 K
Rotational velocity (v sin i)	130 km/s
Age	157 Myr

Other designations
- BD+29°953, HD 37646, HIP 26781, HR 1945, SAO 77393, Gaia DR3 3444230245708929920

Database references
SIMBAD	data

HD 37646 is an eclipsing binary in the northern constellation of Auriga. The companion has only been detected by very shallow eclipses and by the radial velocity variations it produces in the primary star.

In addition to the spectroscopic companion, the 7th-magnitude star HD 37647 shares a common proper motion and parallax with HD 37646. The pair have an angular separation of 26.005″.
