= HD 34557 =

Double star in the constellation Auriga

Observation data Epoch J2000 Equinox J2000
- Constellation: Auriga
- Right ascension: 05^{h} 20^{m} 14.67442^{s}
- Declination: +41° 05′ 10.4558″
- Apparent magnitude (V): 5.52 (5.58 + 8.55)

Characteristics
- Spectral type: A3V
- Apparent magnitude (G): 5.41
- U−B color index: +0.04
- B−V color index: +0.11

Astrometry
Radial velocity (R_{v})	22±4.2 km/s
Proper motion (μ)	RA: −12.007±0.230 mas/yr Dec.: −60.215±0.157 mas/yr
Parallax (π)	13.3485±0.1861 mas
Distance	244 ± 3 ly (75 ± 1 pc)
Absolute magnitude (M_{V})	+0.82

Details
Radius	1.6 R_{☉}
Rotational velocity (v sin i)	217 km/s

Other designations
- BD+40°1253, HD 34557, HIP 24902, HR 1738, SAO 40248, Gaia DR3 194864182347584512

Database references
SIMBAD	data

HD 34557 is a double star in the northern constellation of Auriga. The fainter star has an angular separation of 0.380″ from the primary component. They have a combined apparent magnitude of 5.52, making HD 34557 faintly visible to the naked eye from dark skies. Based upon parallax measurements made with the Hipparcos satellite, this system is roughly 244 light years away. The primary component is spinning rapidly, with a projected rotational velocity of 217 km/s. It has a stellar classification of A3V, making it an A-type main sequence star.
