= NGC 2242 =

Planetary nebula in the constellation Auriga

Emission nebula
- Planetary nebula
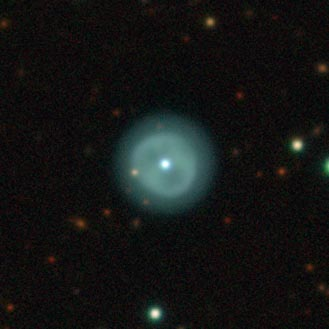
- legacy surveys image

Observation data: J2000 epoch
- Right ascension: 6^{h} 34^{m} 7.4^{s}
- Declination: +44° 46′ 40″
- Distance: 6,500 ly
- Constellation: Auriga constellation
- Designations: PK 170+15 1, ZWG 204.5, IRAS 06304+4448, IRAS F06304+4448

NGC 2242 is a planetary nebula in the constellation Auriga. It was discovered by Lewis A. Swift on November 24, 1886, and was thought to be a galaxy until a study published in 1987 showed it to be a planetary nebula. The nebula is located about 6,500 light-years away, and about 1,600 light-years above the galactic plane.

The central star of the planetary nebula is an O-type star with a spectral type of O(H).
