= HD 33203 =

Double star in the constellation Auriga

Observation data Epoch J2000 Equinox J2000
- Constellation: Auriga
- Right ascension: 05^{h} 10^{m} 18.80756^{s}
- Declination: +37° 18′ 06.6588″
- Apparent magnitude (V): 6.12

Characteristics
- Spectral type: K: + B2II
- U−B color index: −0.36
- B−V color index: +0.72

Astrometry
| Radial velocity (R_{v}) | +8.6 km/s |
| Proper motion (μ) | RA: +3.01 mas/yr Dec.: −0.33 mas/yr |
| Parallax (π) | 2.06±1.15 mas |
| Distance | approx. 1,600 ly (approx. 500 pc) |

Other designations
- BD+37°1067, HD 33203, HIP 24072, SAO 57704

Database references
| SIMBAD | HD 33203 A |
- HD 33203 B

HD 33203 is double star in the northern constellation of Auriga. It includes a bright giant star with a stellar classification of B2II. The two components have an angular separation of 1.617″ along a position angle of 222.1°.
