= HR 2096 =

Star in the constellation Auriga

Observation data Epoch J2000 Equinox ICRS
- Constellation: Auriga
- A
- Right ascension: 06^{h} 00^{m} 18.8979^{s}
- Declination: +44° 35′ 31.247″
- Apparent magnitude (V): 6.20
- B
- Right ascension: 06^{h} 00^{m} 18.8991^{s}
- Declination: +44° 35′ 31.246″
- Apparent magnitude (V): 11.2

Characteristics

A
- Evolutionary stage: red giant branch
- Spectral type: K2III

Astrometry

A
Radial velocity (R_{v})	+3.02±0.01 km/s
Proper motion (μ)	RA: −32.545 mas/yr Dec.: −38.565 mas/yr
Parallax (π)	8.6381±0.0275 mas
Distance	378 ± 1 ly (115.8 ± 0.4 pc)

B
Radial velocity (R_{v})	+3.02±0.01 km/s
Proper motion (μ)	RA: −33.530 mas/yr Dec.: −37.595 mas/yr
Parallax (π)	8.5217±0.0551 mas
Distance	383 ± 2 ly (117.3 ± 0.8 pc)

Details

A
Mass	1.39 M_{☉}
Radius	12.0 R_{☉}
Luminosity	60 L_{☉}
Surface gravity (log g)	2.60 cgs
Temperature	4,646 K
Metallicity [Fe/H]	−0.10 dex
Rotational velocity (v sin i)	3.17 km/s
Age	7.2 Gyr

B
Mass	0.84 M_{☉}
Surface gravity (log g)	4.55 cgs
Temperature	5,495 K
Metallicity [Fe/H]	−0.26 dex

Other designations
- BD+44°1332, HD 40325, HIP 28438, SAO 40769

Database references
SIMBAD	data

HR 2096, also known as HD 40325, is a double star about 380 light years away in the constellation Auriga. The primary is a giant star of spectral type K2III, while the secondary is a hotter but less luminous star. It is not a member of any known moving group of stars.

A third star 35″ (as of 2015) from the closer pair is listed in multiple star catalogues as component C, but it is an unrelated background star. It is another giant of spectral type K0III.
