= HD 36678 =

Star in the constellation Auriga

Observation data Epoch J2000 Equinox ICRS
- Constellation: Auriga
- Right ascension: 05^{h} 36^{m} 35.21822^{s}
- Declination: +54° 25′ 43.1710″
- Apparent magnitude (V): 5.8334

Characteristics
- Evolutionary stage: AGB
- Spectral type: M0III
- Apparent magnitude (G): 5.01
- U−B color index: +1.98
- B−V color index: +1.671±0.006
- Variable type: suspected

Astrometry
Radial velocity (R_{v})	0.91±0.14 km/s
Proper motion (μ)	RA: −6.351±0.055 mas/yr Dec.: −10.625±0.048 mas/yr
Parallax (π)	3.7121±0.0635 mas
Distance	880 ± 20 ly (269 ± 5 pc)
Absolute magnitude (M_{V})	−1.00

Details
Mass	1.38 M_{☉}
Radius	63.2+7.0 −4.7 R_{☉}
Luminosity	875±34 L_{☉}
Surface gravity (log g)	0.79 cgs
Temperature	3,950+154 −202 K
Metallicity [Fe/H]	−0.12 dex

Other designations
- BD+54°914, HD 36678, HIP 26344, HR 1866, SAO 25276, Gaia DR3 264919909305988224

Database references
SIMBAD	data

HD 36678 is single star in the northern constellation of Auriga. This star is dimly visible to the naked eye with an apparent visual magnitude of 5.83. It is located at a distance of approximately 880 light years from the Sun based on parallax.

This is an aging red giant star with a stellar classification of M0III. It is currently on the asymptotic giant branch of the HR diagram, and has expanded to ~63 times the radius of the Sun. The star is radiating ~875 times the Sun's luminosity from its enlarged photosphere at an effective temperature of 3,950 K.

The brightness of HD 36678 is suspected of being variable. Hipparcos photometry showed maximum and minimum apparent magnitudes of 5.806 and 5.855 respectively, in the Hipparcos photometric band. No period was found, the variability has not been confirmed, and the star is not formally listed as a variable star.
