= 14 Aurigae =

Quadruple star system in the constellation Auriga

- Location of 14 Aurigae (circled in red)

Observation data Epoch J2000 Equinox ICRS
- Constellation: Auriga
- Right ascension: 05^{h} 15^{m} 24.39420^{s}
- Declination: +32° 41′ 15.3597″
- Apparent magnitude (V): 5.01 (5.08 + 7.86)

Characteristics
- Spectral type: A9IV + ? + F5V + M3V: + WDA
- U−B color index: +0.19
- B−V color index: +0.222±0.004
- Variable type: δ Scuti

Astrometry
Radial velocity (R_{v})	−9.3±0.2 km/s
Proper motion (μ)	RA: −25.256±0.121 mas/yr Dec.: +12.339±0.087 mas/yr
Parallax (π)	12.0126±0.1151 mas
Distance	272 ± 3 ly (83.2 ± 0.8 pc)
Absolute magnitude (M_{V})	0.31

Details

14 Aur Aa
Mass	1.64 M_{☉}
Luminosity	62.07 L_{☉}
Surface gravity (log g)	3.46 cgs
Temperature	7,498 K
Metallicity [Fe/H]	−0.02 dex
Rotation	2.11 h
Rotational velocity (v sin i)	27.6 km/s
Age	609 Myr

Other designations
- 14 Aur, KW Aurigae, AG+32°492, BD+32°922, GC 6411, HD 33959, HIP 24504, HR 1706, SAO 57799, ADS 3824, CCDM J05154+3242, TYC 2394-2028-1, GCRV 3112, GSC 02394-02028

Database references
SIMBAD	data

14 Aurigae is a quadruple star system located 272 light years away from the Sun in the zodiac constellation of Auriga. It has the variable star designation KW Aurigae, whereas 14 Aurigae is the Flamsteed designation. It is visible to the naked eye as a faint, white-hued star with a combined apparent visual magnitude of 5.01. The system is moving closer to the Sun with a heliocentric radial velocity of −9 km/s.

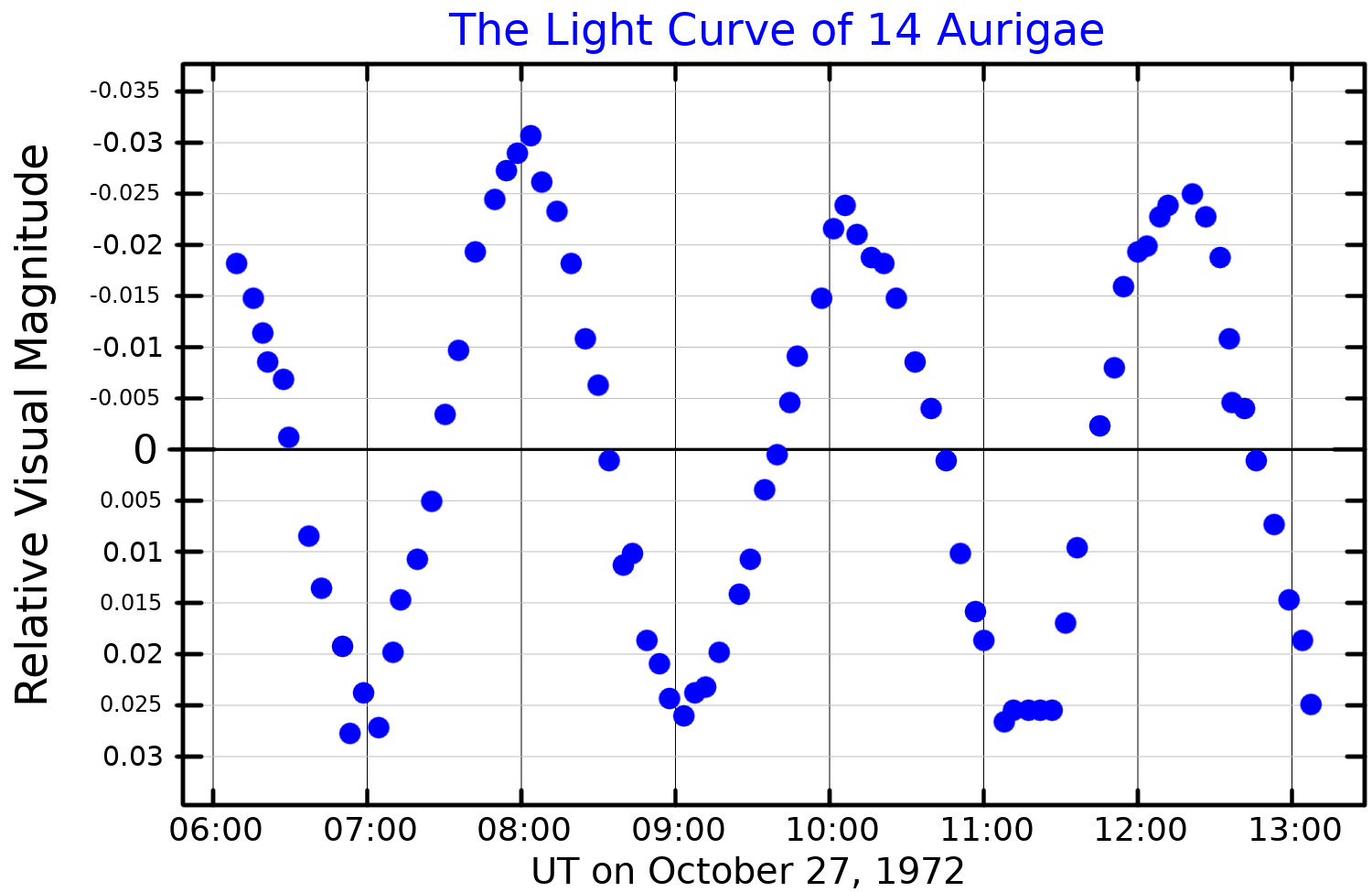
A visual band light curve for 14 Aurigae, adapted from Fitch and Wisniewski (1979)

The magnitude 5.08 primary member, designated component A, is a single-lined spectroscopic binary system in a circular orbit with a period of 3.7887 days. The visible member has a stellar classification of A9 IV or A V, depending on the source. In 1966, Ivan John Danziger and Robert John Dickens discovered that 14 Aurigae star is a variable star. It is a Delta Scuti variable with an amplitude of 0.08 magnitude and a period of 2.11 hours. It is 609 million years old with 1.64 times the mass of the Sun.

Component B lies about 10″ to the north of the primary and is merely a visual companion. However, component C, an F-type main sequence star of magnitude 7.86, shares a common proper motion with component A and thus they form a system. This member is also a single-lined spectroscopic binary, having a period of 2.9934 days. The final member of the system, now designated component Cb, is a white dwarf star that is separated from the C, or rather Ca pair by 2″. While it is statistically unlikely that a chance alignment between Cb and the rest of the system would occur, it has not been proven whether Cb is a physical companion of Ca. If Cb is indeed bound to Ca, which would make 14 Aurigae a quintuple system, its orbital period is around 1,300 years.
