= HD 43691 =

Star in the constellation Auriga

Observation data Epoch J2000 Equinox ICRS
- Constellation: Auriga
- Right ascension: 06^{h} 19^{m} 34.676^{s}
- Declination: +41° 05′ 32.30″
- Apparent magnitude (V): 8.03

Characteristics
- Evolutionary stage: subgiant
- Spectral type: G0 IV
- B−V color index: 0.596±0.015
- Variable type: None

Astrometry
Radial velocity (R_{v})	−28.97±0.02 km/s
Proper motion (μ)	RA: 22.684 mas/yr Dec.: −53.140 mas/yr
Parallax (π)	11.6726±0.0346 mas
Distance	279.4 ± 0.8 ly (85.7 ± 0.3 pc)
Absolute magnitude (M_{V})	3.52

Details
Mass	1.32±0.09 M_{☉}
Radius	1.704±0.023 R_{☉}
Luminosity	2.24±0.02 L_{☉}
Surface gravity (log g)	4.19±0.02 cgs
Temperature	5,920±34 K
Metallicity [Fe/H]	0.32±0.03 dex
Rotational velocity (v sin i)	4.7 km/s
Age	3.1±2.5 Gyr

Other designations
- BD+41°1415, HD 43691, HIP 30057, SAO 41025, PPM 48960, TYC 2930-2105-1, GSC 02930-02105, 2MASS J06193467+4105321

Database references
SIMBAD	data

HD 43691 is a star with an orbiting exoplanet in the constellation Auriga. With an apparent visual magnitude of 8.03, it is too faint to be visible to the naked eye. This system is located at a distance of 279 light years based on parallax measurements, but is drifting closer with a heliocentric radial velocity of −29 km/s.

This is a slightly evolved G-type subgiant star with a stellar classification of G0 IV. It is ceasing thermonuclear fusion of hydrogen in its core and will expand to become a red giant. The star has 32% greater mass than the Sun and has a 70% larger girth. It is radiating 2.2 times the luminosity of the Sun from its photosphere at an effective temperature of 5,920 K. The level of chromospheric activity is minimal, allowing for accurate measurement of radial velocity variation.

== Planetary system ==
In July 2007, the star is found to have a super-jovian exoplanet in orbit around it. It has minimum mass two and a half times that of Jupiter and orbits the star closer than Mercury to the Sun.

The HD 43691 planetary system
Companion (in order from star)	Mass	Semimajor axis (AU)	Orbital period (days)	Eccentricity	Inclination (°)	Radius
b	≥2.57+0.31 −0.34 M_{J}	0.238+0.014 −0.016	36.99913+0.00095 −0.00092	0.085+0.012 −0.011	—	—

== See also ==
- List of extrasolar planets
