= HD 30453 =

Binary star in the constellation Auriga

Observation data Epoch J2000 Equinox J2000
- Constellation: Auriga
- Right ascension: 04^{h} 49^{m} 19.0801^{s}
- Declination: +32° 35′ 17.492″
- Apparent magnitude (V): 5.86

Characteristics
- Spectral type: A8m or Am(A7/F0/F2)
- Apparent magnitude (G): 5.79
- U−B color index: +0.14
- B−V color index: +0.24

Astrometry
Radial velocity (R_{v})	16.654±0.012 km/s
Proper motion (μ)	RA: +18.459±0.060 mas/yr Dec.: −34.638±0.040 mas/yr
Parallax (π)	9.8483±0.0482 mas
Distance	331 ± 2 ly (101.5 ± 0.5 pc)
Absolute magnitude (M_{V})	1.23

Orbit
Period (P)	7.0508687±0.0000023 d
Semi-major axis (a)	≥5.7633±0.0016 Gm
Eccentricity (e)	0.0 (adopted)
Periastron epoch (T)	2454673.72440±0.00043 MJD
Semi-amplitude (K_{1}) (primary)	0.442±0.017 km/s
Semi-amplitude (K_{2}) (secondary)	0.283±0.065 km/s

Details
Radius	3.59+0.16 −0.45 R_{☉}
Luminosity	38.2±0.5 L_{☉}
Temperature	7,568+532 −160 K
Rotational velocity (v sin i)	16.0±9.7 km/s

Other designations
- BD+32°840, HD 30453, HIP 22407, HR 1528, SAO 57444

Database references
SIMBAD	data

HD 30453 is a binary star system in the northern constellation of Auriga. It is visible to the naked eye with an apparent visual magnitude of 5.86. The system is located at a distance of approximately 331 light years from the Sun based on parallax. It is drifting further away from the Sun with a radial velocity of 16.65 km/s.

This is a double-lined spectroscopic binary system with an essentially circular orbit and a period of one week. The primary component is a chemically peculiar star of type CP1, or Am star, with a stellar classification of A8m. Abt and Morrell (1995) classed it as Am(A7/F0/F2), indicating it has the hydrogen lines of an A7 star, the calcium K line of a cooler F0 star, and the metallic lines of an F2 class. It has been mentioned as a potential variable star. The star has 3.6 times the girth of the Sun and is radiating 38 times the Sun's luminosity from its photosphere at an effective temperature of 7568 K. It has a moderate rotation rate, with a projected rotational velocity of around 16 km/s.

A third component was detected in 1987 using speckle interferometry at an angular separation of 0.04″.
