= NGC 2281 =

Open cluster in the northern constellation of Auriga

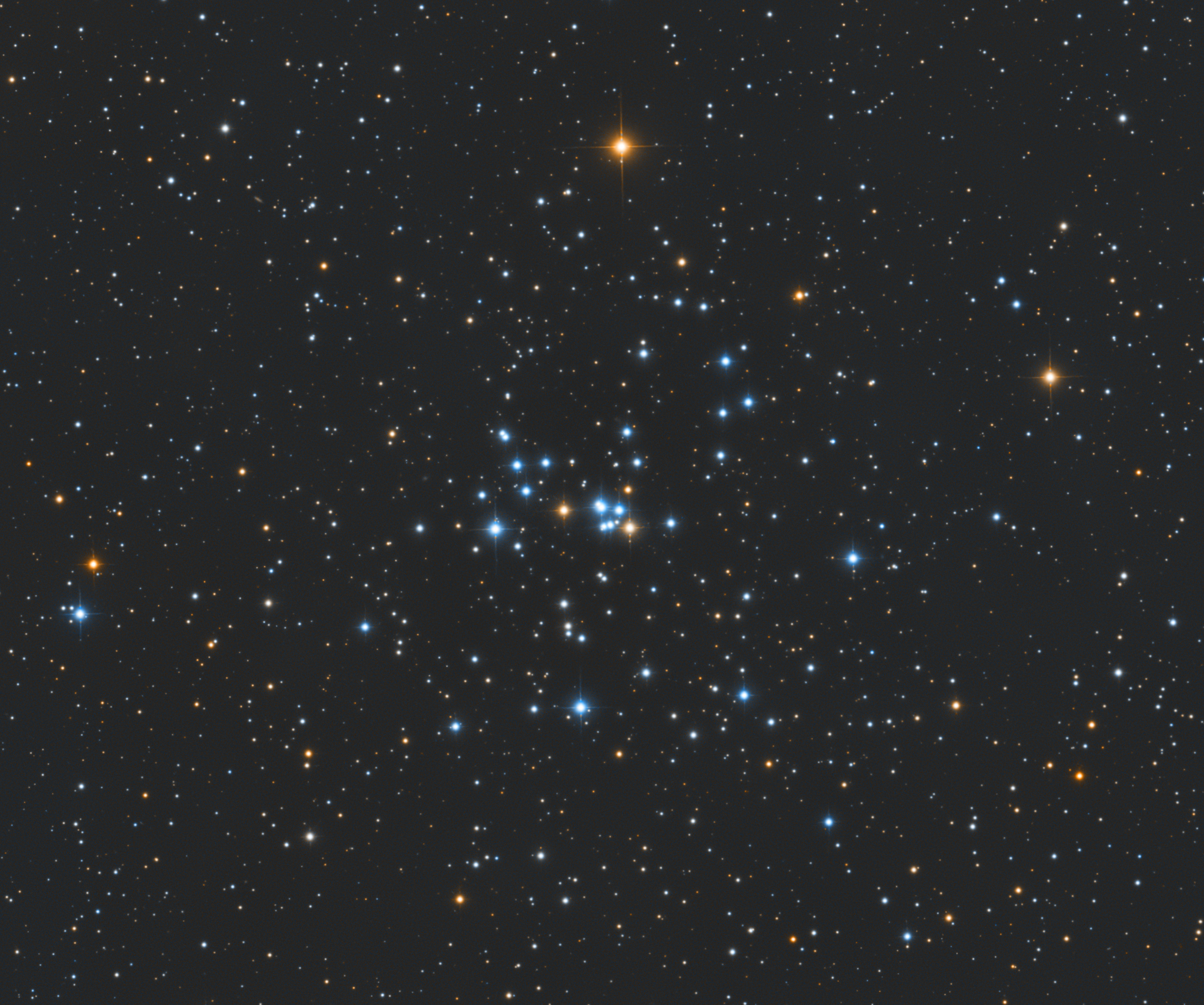
- NGC 2281

Observation data (J2000 epoch)
- Right ascension: 06^{h} 48^{m} 17.(0)^{s}
- Declination: +41° 04′ 4(2)″
- Distance: 1,722+104 −91 ly (528+32 −28 pc)
- Apparent magnitude (V): 5.4
- Apparent dimensions (V): 25′

Physical characteristics
- Estimated age: 610 million
- Other designations: Cr 116, Mel 51, C0645+411, OCL-446

Associations
- Constellation: Auriga

NGC 2281, also known as the Broken Heart Cluster, is an open cluster of stars in the northern constellation of Auriga. It was discovered by English astronomer William Herschel on March 4, 1788, and described as a, "cluster of coarsely scattered pretty [bright] stars, pretty rich". The Trumpler class for NGC 2281 is I3p, indicating a poor (p) but compact (I) grouping with a wide range of brightness (3). It is located at a distance of approximately 1,720 ly from the Sun and is 630–661 million years old.
