= NGC 1857 =

Open star cluster in the constellation Auriga

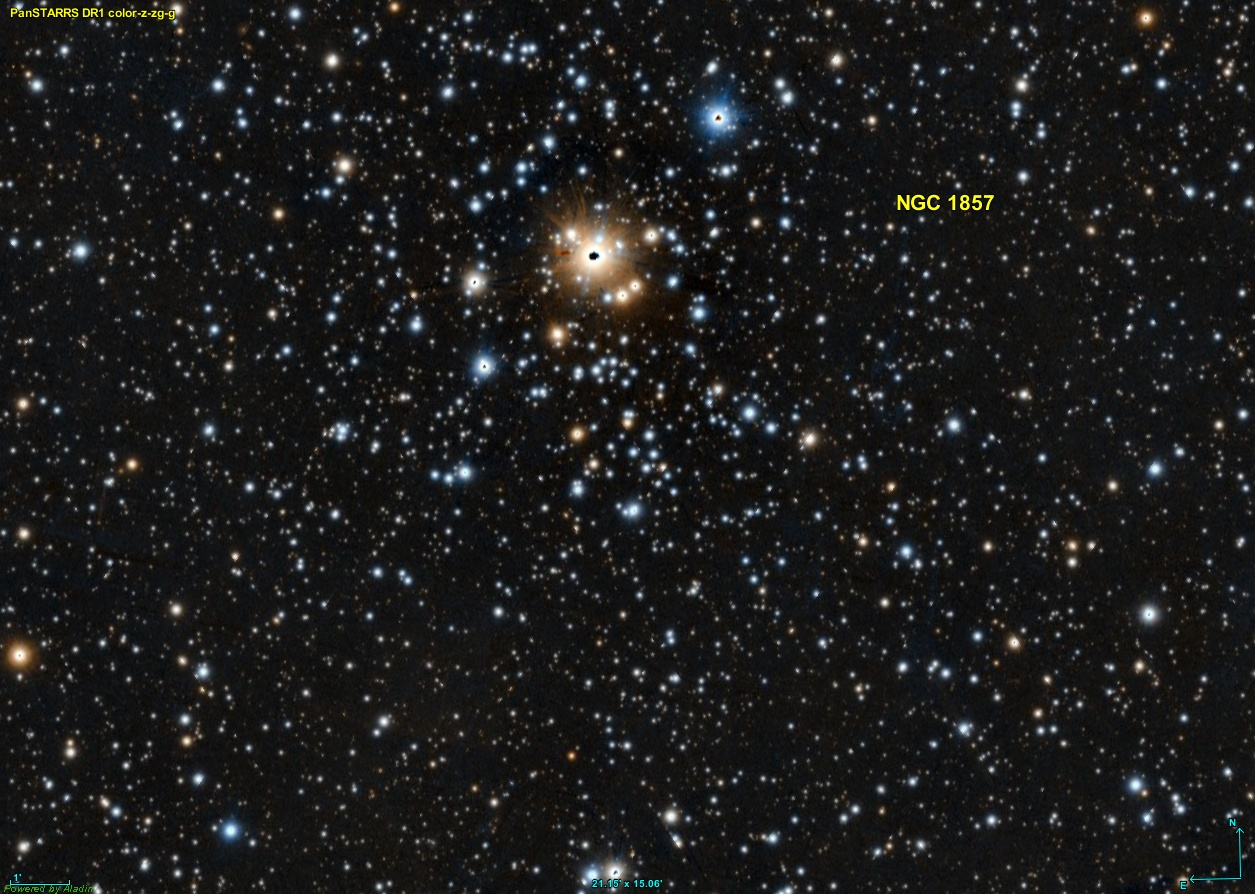
- Pan-STARRS image of NGC 1857

Observation data (J2000 epoch)
- Right ascension: 05^{h} 20^{m} 07.4^{s}
- Declination: +39° 20′ 10″
- Distance: 9,057 ly (2,777.0 pc)
- Apparent magnitude (V): 7.0
- Apparent dimensions (V): 7′

Physical characteristics
- Estimated age: 257 Ma
- Other designations: C 0411+511, OCl 397.0, NGC 1857

Associations
- Constellation: Auriga

NGC 1857 is an open cluster of stars in the northern constellation of Auriga, less than a degree to the south of the naked eye star Lambda Aurigae. It was discovered by German-English astronomer William Herschel on September 30, 1780. This cluster has an apparent visual magnitude of 7.0 and spans an angular size of 7′ on the sky. NGC 1857 lies at an estimated distance of 9,057 light-years (2,777 pc) from the Sun, toward the galactic anticenter.

NGC 1857 has 360±100 member stars and an estimated age of 257 million years. In the Trumpler classification system, it is rated as 'II 2 r'. This indicates it is somewhat disparate (II), of moderate brightness (2), and is rich in stars (r). The abundance of elements more massive than helium, the cluster's metallicity, is nearly the same as in the Sun.

The core radius of NGC 1857 is 3.41+1.41
−1.23 pc, while it has a King radius of 12.52+52.30
−6.78 pc. The estimated mass within the latter radius is 586.1±17.9 M_{☉}. The irregular morphology of NGC 1857 suggests it has two dense core regions rather than just one. NGC 1857 has a small angular separation from another open cluster, Czernik 20. However, this is most likely a chance alignment.
