= Messier 37 =

Open cluster in the constellation Auriga

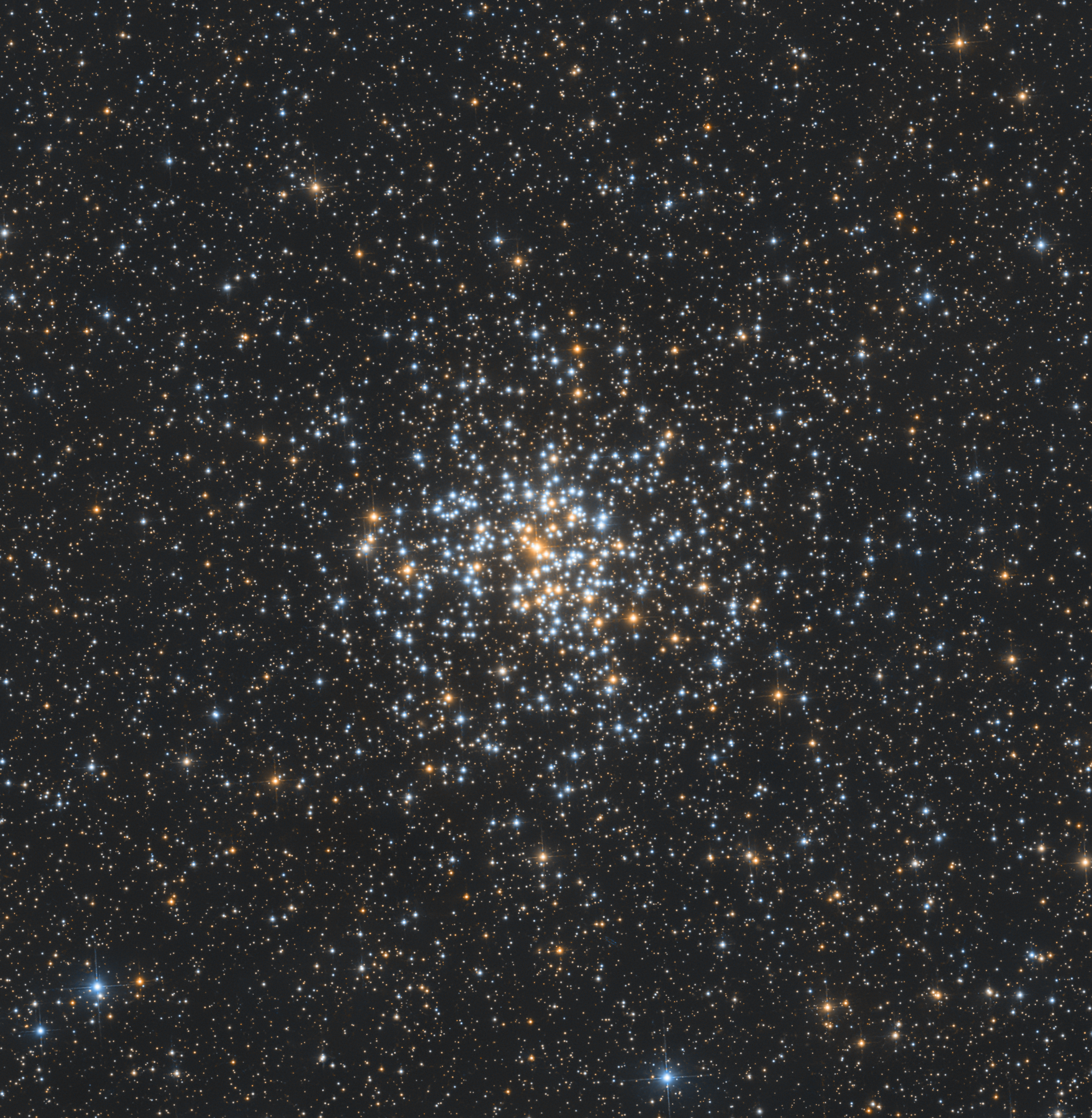
- Open cluster Messier 37 in Auriga

Observation data (J2000.0 epoch)
- Right ascension: 5^{h} 52^{m} 18^{s}
- Declination: +32° 33′ 02″
- Distance: 4.511 kly (1.383 kpc)
- Apparent magnitude (V): 6.2
- Apparent dimensions (V): 24′

Physical characteristics
- Mass: 1,500 M_{☉}
- Radius: 10-13 ly
- Estimated age: 346.7 to 550 Ma
- Other designations: NGC 2099

Associations
- Constellation: Auriga

Messier 37 (also known as M37, NGC 2099, or the Salt and Pepper Cluster) is the brightest and richest open cluster in the constellation Auriga. It was discovered by the Italian astronomer Giovanni Battista Hodierna before 1654. M37 was missed by French astronomer Guillaume Le Gentil when he rediscovered M36 and M38 in 1749. French astronomer Charles Messier independently rediscovered M37 in September 1764 but all three of these clusters were recorded by Hodierna. It is classified as Trumpler type I,1,r or I,2,r.

M37 exists in the antipodal direction, opposite from the Galactic Center as seen from Earth, so is in one of the nearby outer arms. Specifically it is still close enough to be in our own. Estimates of its age range from 347 million to 550 million years. It has 1,500 times the mass of the Sun (M_{☉}) and contains over 500 identified stars, with roughly 150 stars brighter than magnitude 12.5. M37 has at least a dozen red giants and its hottest surviving main sequence star is of stellar classification B9 V. The abundance of elements other than hydrogen and helium, what astronomers term metallicity, is similar to, if not slightly higher than, the abundance in the Sun. As of 2022, it contains only the third known planetary nebula associated with an open cluster.

At its estimated distance of around 4,500 light-years (1,400 parsecs) from Earth, the cluster's angular diameter of 24 arcminutes corresponds to a physical extent of about 20–25 ly (6.1–7.7 pc). The tidal radius of the cluster, where external gravitational perturbations begin to have a significant influence on the orbits of its member stars, is about 46–59 ly (14–18 pc). This cluster is following an orbit through the Milky Way with a period of 219.3 Ma and an eccentricity of 0.22. This will bring it as close as 19.6 kly (6.0 kpc) to, and as distant as 30.7 kly (9.4 kpc) from, the Galactic Center. It reaches a peak distance above the galactic plane of 0.29 kly (0.089 kpc) and will cross the plane with a period of 31.7 Ma.

== Sky charts ==
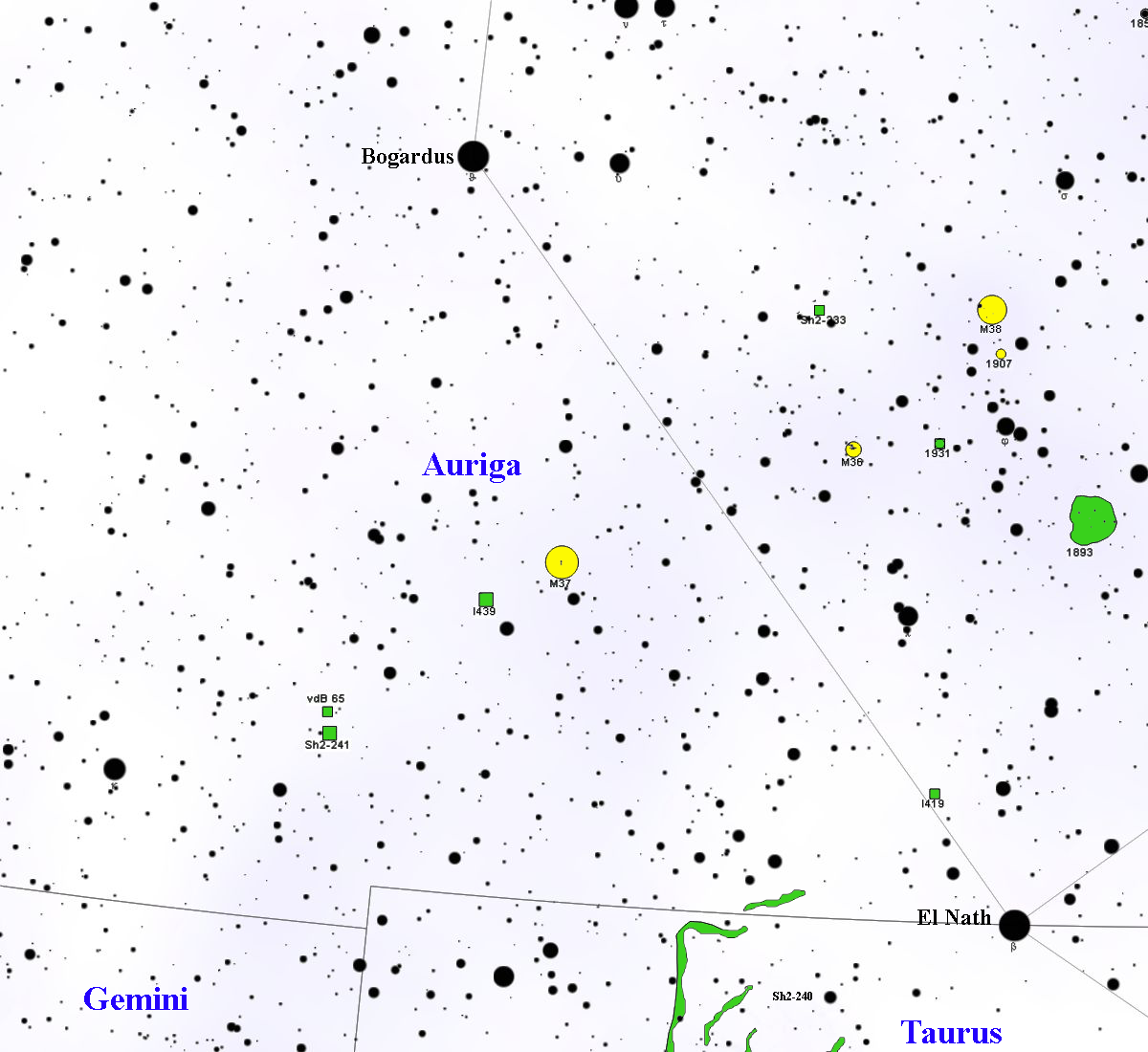
M37 appears as the central yellow dot in this large-scale (close range), detailed map

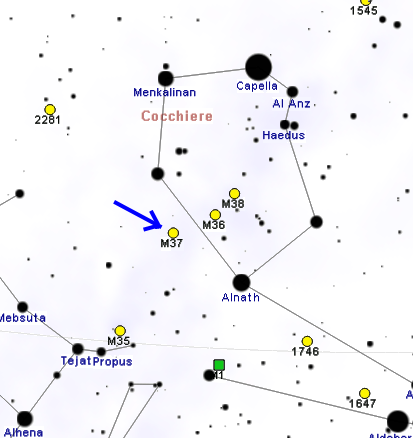
Small-scale (outline) map. Cocchierre (Italian) translates to Auriga.

== See also ==
- List of Messier objects
