= NGC 1664 =

Open cluster in the constellation Auriga

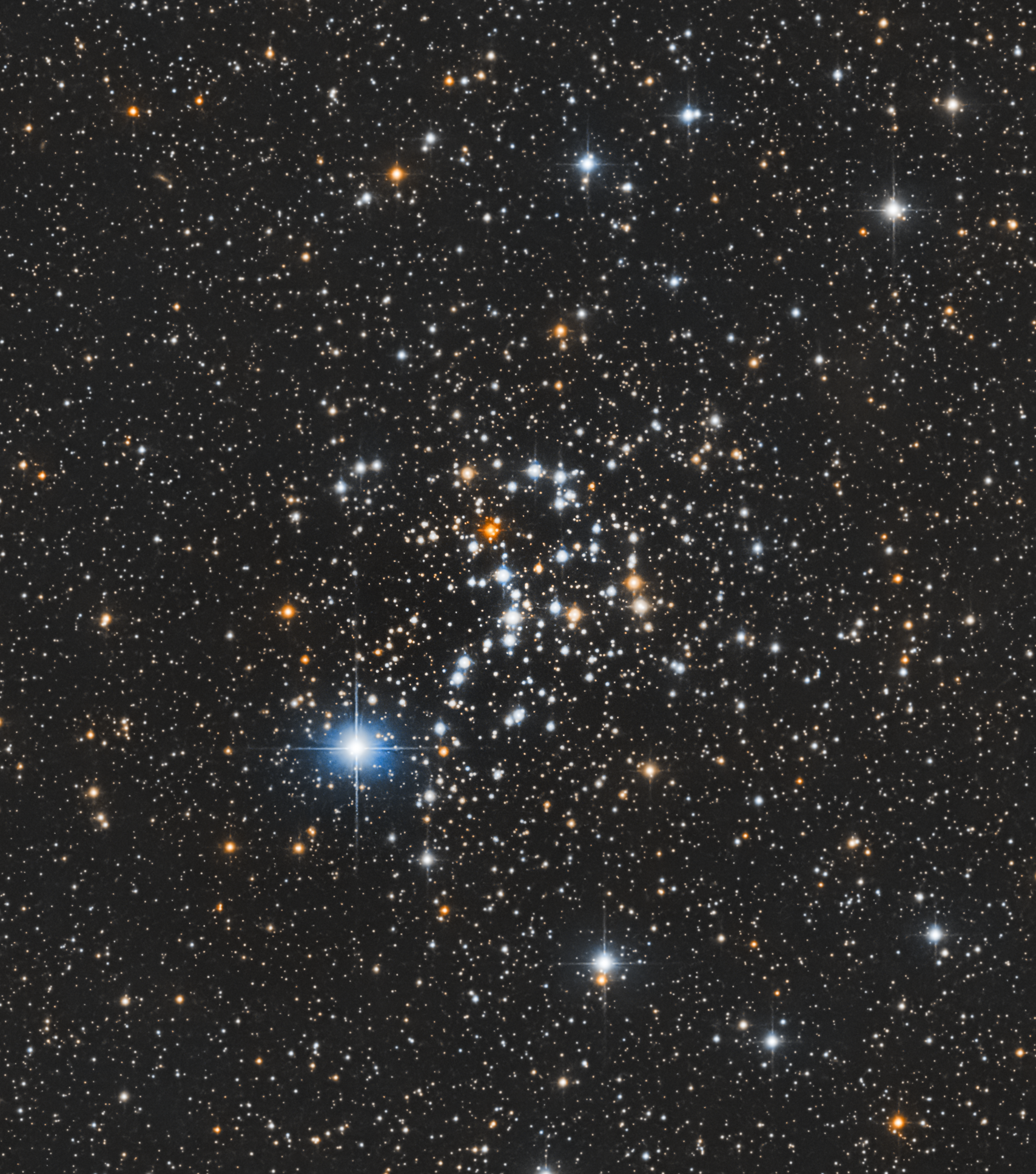
- NGC 1664. It's called the Kite Cluster because of its asterism.

Observation data (J2000 epoch)
- Right ascension: 04^{h} 51^{m} 06.(0)^{s}
- Declination: +43° 40′ 3(0)″
- Distance: 4,200 ± 150 ly (1,289 ± 47 pc)
- Apparent magnitude (V): 7.6
- Apparent dimensions (V): 18.0′

Physical characteristics
- Mass: 640 M_{☉}
- Other designations: C0447+436, Collinder 56, Lund 143, Melotte 27, OCL 411, Raab 19

Associations
- Constellation: Auriga

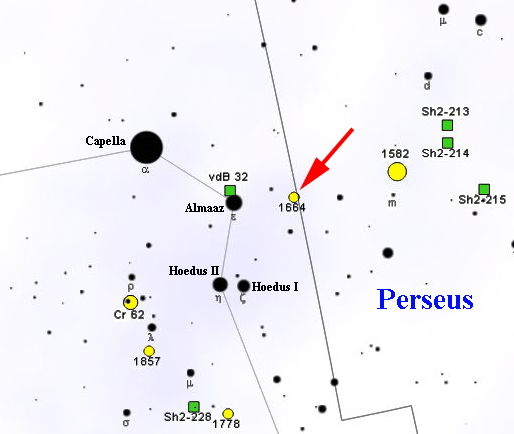
Map showing the location of NGC 1664

NGC 1664 is an open cluster in the constellation of Auriga. It contains stars with a total of around 640 solar masses with a tidal radius of 43 ly (13.2 pc).

NGC 1664 is a somewhat young cluster, with an age of 675 ± 50 Myr, and is dynamically relaxed. It is located some 4,200 light-years away, or about 1.3 kpc. Born outside of the solar circle, it orbits the center of the Milky Way every 244 million years.
