= HD 43691 b =

Massive gas giant or jovian exoplanet in the constellation of Auriga

Discovery
- Discovered by: Da Silva et al.
- Discovery site: ELODIE planet-search program
- Discovery date: July 6, 2007
- Detection method: Doppler spectroscopy

Orbital characteristics
- Semi-major axis: 0.238±0.015 AU
- Eccentricity: 0.0796±0.0067
- Orbital period (sidereal): 36.9987±0.0011 d
- Time of periastron: 2,463,048.04±0.49
- Argument of periastron: 292.7±4.8
- Semi-amplitude: 130.06±0.84
- Star: HD 43691

HD 43691 b is a massive jovian planet located approximately 280 light-years away in the constellation of Auriga. Because the inclination is unknown, only the minimum mass is known. The planet orbits close to the star, closer than Mercury to the Sun.
