= Omega Aurigae =

Star in the constellation Auriga

- Location of ω Aurigae (circled in red)

Observation data Epoch J2000 Equinox J2000
- Constellation: Auriga
- Right ascension: 04^{h} 59^{m} 15.409^{s}
- Declination: +37° 53′ 24.88″
- Apparent magnitude (V): 4.95

Characteristics
- Evolutionary stage: main sequence
- Spectral type: A1 V
- U−B color index: +0.01
- B−V color index: +0.05
- R−I color index: 0.03

Astrometry
Radial velocity (R_{v})	+7.7±2.5 km/s
Proper motion (μ)	RA: +45.340 mas/yr Dec.: −97.647 mas/yr
Parallax (π)	20.1236±0.2385 mas
Distance	162 ± 2 ly (49.7 ± 0.6 pc)
Absolute magnitude (M_{V})	+1.34

Details

ω Aur A
Mass	2.29±0.04 M_{☉}
Radius	2.0 R_{☉}
Luminosity	27 L_{☉}
Surface gravity (log g)	4.33 cgs
Temperature	9,230 K
Metallicity [Fe/H]	−0.12 dex
Rotational velocity (v sin i)	107 km/s
Age	317 Myr

ω Aur B
Mass	1.1 M_{☉}

Other designations
- ω Aur, 4 Aur, BD+37°1005, GC 6064, HD 31647, HIP 23179, HR 1592, SAO 57548, PPM 400070, WDS J04593+3753AB

Database references
SIMBAD	data

Omega Aurigae is a double star in the northern constellation of Auriga. Its name is a Bayer designation that is Latinized from ω Aurigae, and abbreviated Omega Aur or ω Aur. This star has a combined apparent visual magnitude of 4.95, which is bright enough to be seen with the naked eye. The distance to this system, as determined using parallax measurements, is approximately 162 light-years (50 parsecs). It is receding from the Sun with a radial velocity of +8 km/s. The system is a member of the Columba group of co-moving stars.

The primary component is an A-type main sequence star with a stellar classification of A1 V. It is 317 million years old with a high rate of spin, showing a projected rotational velocity of 107 km/s. The star has 2.3 times the mass of the Sun and double the Sun's radius. It is radiating 27 times the Sun's luminosity from its photosphere at an effective temperature of 9,230 K. The object displays an infrared excess, suggesting an orbiting debris disk with a temperature of 20 K at a mean radius of 932.40 AU from the host star.

There is a magnitude 8.18 companion at an angular separation of 4.99 arcseconds along a position angle of 4.30°. This corresponds to a physical separation of 234.2 au. The system is an X-ray source with a luminosity of 16.57×10^{29} ergs s^{−1}.
