= Kappa Aurigae =

G-type giant star in the constellation Auriga

κ Aurigae
- Location of κ Aurigae (circled)

Observation data Epoch J2000 Equinox J2000
- Constellation: Auriga
- Right ascension: 06^{h} 15^{m} 22.688^{s}
- Declination: +29° 29′ 53.08″
- Apparent magnitude (V): 4.335

Characteristics
- Evolutionary stage: horizontal branch
- Spectral type: G8.5 IIIb
- U−B color index: +0.812
- B−V color index: +1.023
- R−I color index: 0.54

Astrometry
Radial velocity (R_{v})	+20.69±0.15 km/s
Proper motion (μ)	RA: −72.404 mas/yr Dec.: −261.101 mas/yr
Parallax (π)	18.2703±0.1609 mas
Distance	179 ± 2 ly (54.7 ± 0.5 pc)
Absolute magnitude (M_{V})	+0.65

Details
Mass	1.25 M_{☉}
Radius	11 R_{☉}
Luminosity	54 L_{☉}
Surface gravity (log g)	2.7 cgs
Temperature	4,732 K
Metallicity [Fe/H]	−0.33 dex
Rotational velocity (v sin i)	2.5 km/s
Age	5.59 Gyr

Other designations
- κ Aur, 44 Aurigae, NSV 2877, BD+29°1154, FK5 1168, Gaia DR3 3436911415279548032, GC 7981, HD 43039, HIP 29696, HR 2219, SAO 78143, PPM 95662, LTT 11816, 2MASS J06152269+2929535

Database references
SIMBAD	data

Kappa Aurigae is a star in the northern constellation of Auriga. Its name is a Bayer designation that is Latinised from κ Aurigae, and is abbreviated Kappa Aur or κ Aur. This star is visible to the naked eye with an apparent visual magnitude of 4.3. Based upon an annual parallax shift of 18.27 mas, it is approximately 179 light-years (55 parsecs) distant from Earth. This is a high proper motion star, traversing the celestial sphere at an angular rate of 0.272″ yr^{−1}. It is drifting further away with a radial velocity of +21 km/s.

This is an evolved giant star with a stellar classification of G8.5 IIIb. It is a red clump star, which means it is towards the cool end of the horizontal branch and is generating energy through the fusion of helium at its core. The star is 5.6 billion years old and is spinning with a projected rotational velocity of 2.5 km/s. With 1.25 times the mass of the Sun, Kappa Aurigae has expanded to 11 times the radius of the Sun and shines with 54 times the Sun's luminosity. This energy is radiated into outer space from the photosphere at an effective temperature of 4,732 K. At this heat, the star glows with the orange hue of a G-type star.
