= 2 Aurigae =

Possible binary star system in the constellation Auriga

- Location of 2 Aurigae (circled)

Observation data Epoch J2000.0 Equinox ICRS
- Constellation: Auriga
- Right ascension: 04^{h} 52^{m} 37.98035^{s}
- Declination: +36° 42′ 11.4771″
- Apparent magnitude (V): +4.79

Characteristics
- Evolutionary stage: red giant branch
- Spectral type: K3- III Ba0.4
- Apparent magnitude (G): 4.28
- B−V color index: 1.414±0.003

Astrometry
Radial velocity (R_{v})	−17.24±0.08 km/s
Proper motion (μ)	RA: −25.273±0.125 mas/yr Dec.: −3.715±0.098 mas/yr
Parallax (π)	5.2978±0.1192 mas
Distance	620 ± 10 ly (189 ± 4 pc)
Absolute magnitude (M_{V})	–1.84

Details
Mass	2.86 M_{☉}
Radius	48.14+0.83 −1.79 R_{☉}
Luminosity	599±29 L_{☉}
Surface gravity (log g)	1.79 cgs
Temperature	4,115+79 −35 K
Metallicity [Fe/H]	−0.24±0.03 dex
Rotational velocity (v sin i)	2.3 km/s
Age	1.80 Gyr

Other designations
- 2 Aur, BD+36°952, FK5 1201, HD 30834, HIP 22678, HR 1551, SAO 57475, Gaia DR3 198271397081746560

Database references
SIMBAD	data

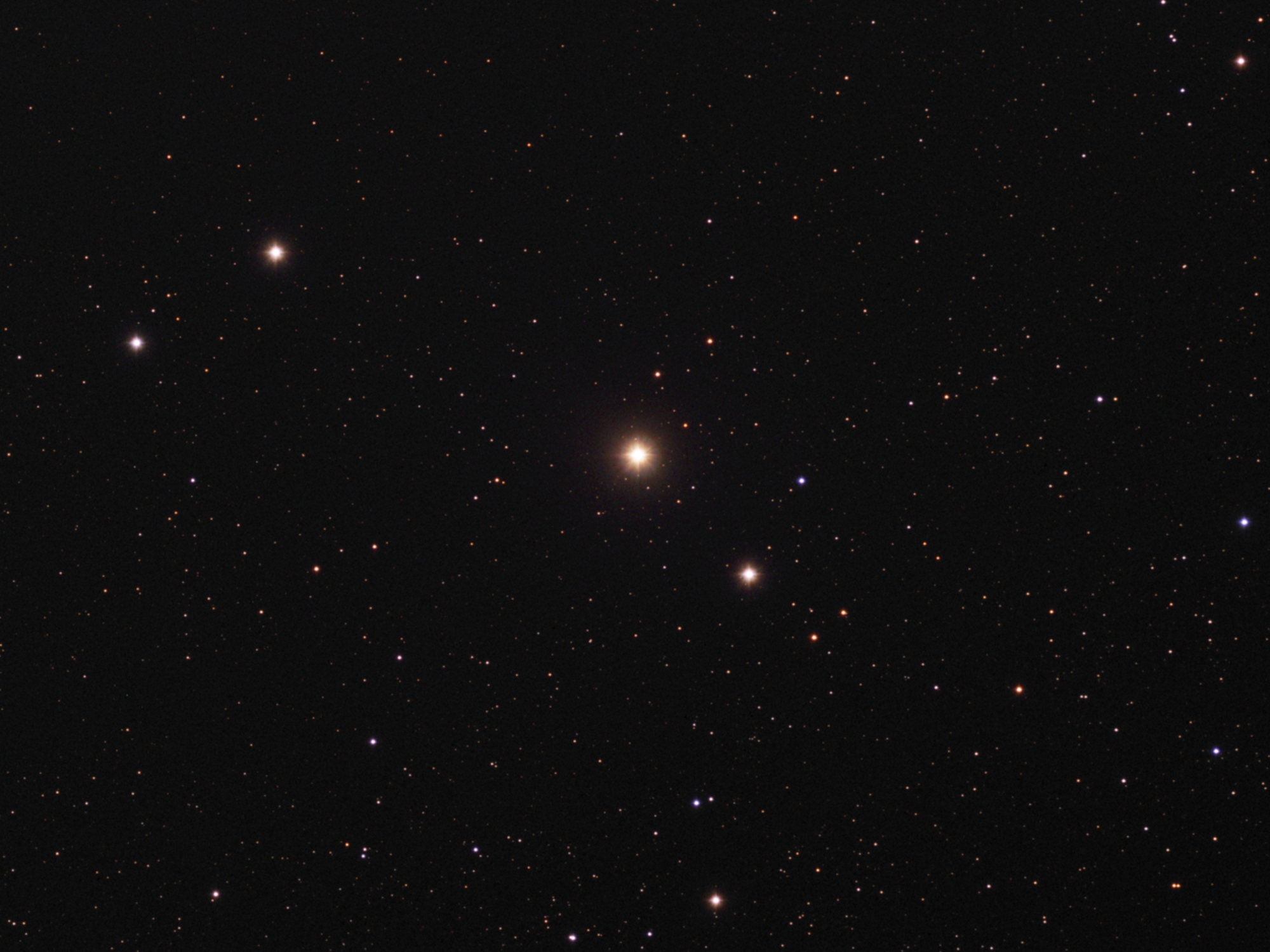
2 Aurigae in optical light

2 Aurigae is a possible binary star system in the northern constellation of Auriga. This object is visible to the naked eye as a faint, orange-hued star with an apparent visual magnitude of +4.79. It forms an attractive four-star asterism when viewed in a low power eyepiece, together with the nearby HIP 22647 and another very loose visual pair, HIP 22776 and HIP 22744, all above magnitude 8. 2 Aurigae is moving closer to the Earth with a heliocentric radial velocity of −17 km/s.

The visible component is an aging giant star with a stellar classification of K3- III Ba0.4. The suffix notation indicates this is a mild barium star, which means the stellar atmosphere is enriched with s-process elements. It is either a member of a close binary system and has previously acquired these elements from a (now) white dwarf companion or else it is on the asymptotic giant branch and is generating the elements itself. 2 Aurigae is 1.80 billion years old with 2.86 times the mass of the Sun and has expanded to 48 times the Sun's radius. It is radiating 599 times the Sun's luminosity from its enlarged photosphere at an effective temperature of 4,115 K.
