= NGC 1907 =

Open cluster in the constellation Auriga

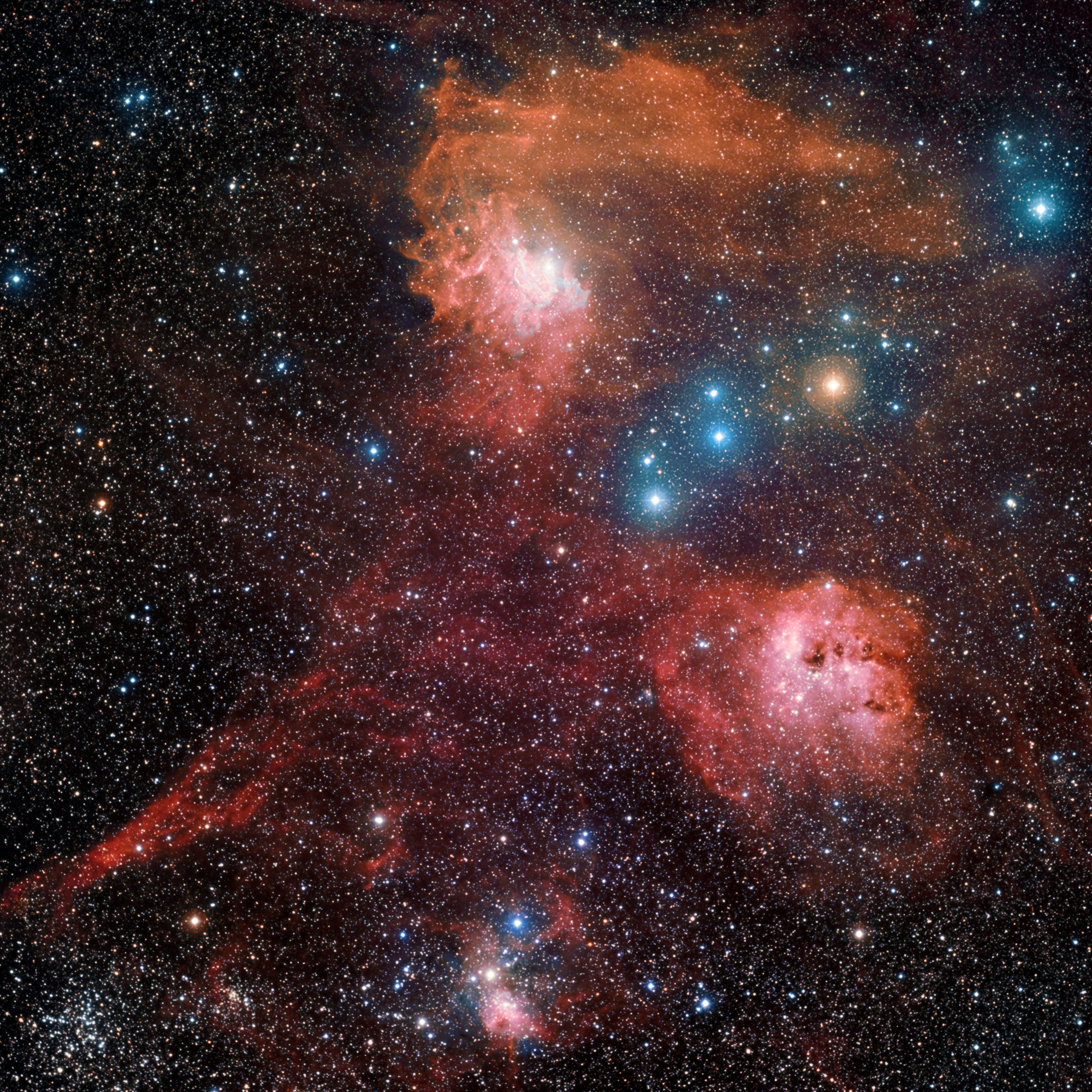
- NGC 1907 is located just to the right of Messier 38 which is located in the far left corner.

Observation data (J2000 epoch)
- Right ascension: 05^{h} 28^{m} 06^{s}
- Declination: +35° 19′ 30″
- Distance: 5,200 ly (1,600 pc)
- Apparent magnitude (V): 8.2
- Apparent dimensions (V): 6′

Physical characteristics
- Radius: 12 ly
- Estimated age: 500 million yrs
- Lynga 05 28.0 +35 19 (2000); Skiff 05 28 05 +35 19.5 (2000)
- Other designations: C 0524+352, OCl 434

Associations
- Constellation: Auriga

NGC 1907 is an open star cluster around 5,200 light years from Earth. It contains around 300 stars and is around 500 million years old. With a magnitude of 8.2, it is visible in the constellation Auriga.
