= Delta Aurigids =

Meteor shower

- Celestial map of Auriga

Radiant
- Constellation: Auriga
- Right ascension: 5^{h} 36^{m} -0^{s}
- Declination: +44° 00′ 00″

Properties
- Occurs during: October 10 to October 18
- Date of peak: October 11
- Velocity: 64 km/s
- Zenithal hourly rate: 2

Delta Aurigids, or DAU is a minor reliable meteor shower that takes place from October 10 to 18. The peak of the shower is on October 11, with two meteors per hour. The velocity is 143,000 mph.
