= C/1911 N1 (Kiess) =

Non-periodic comet

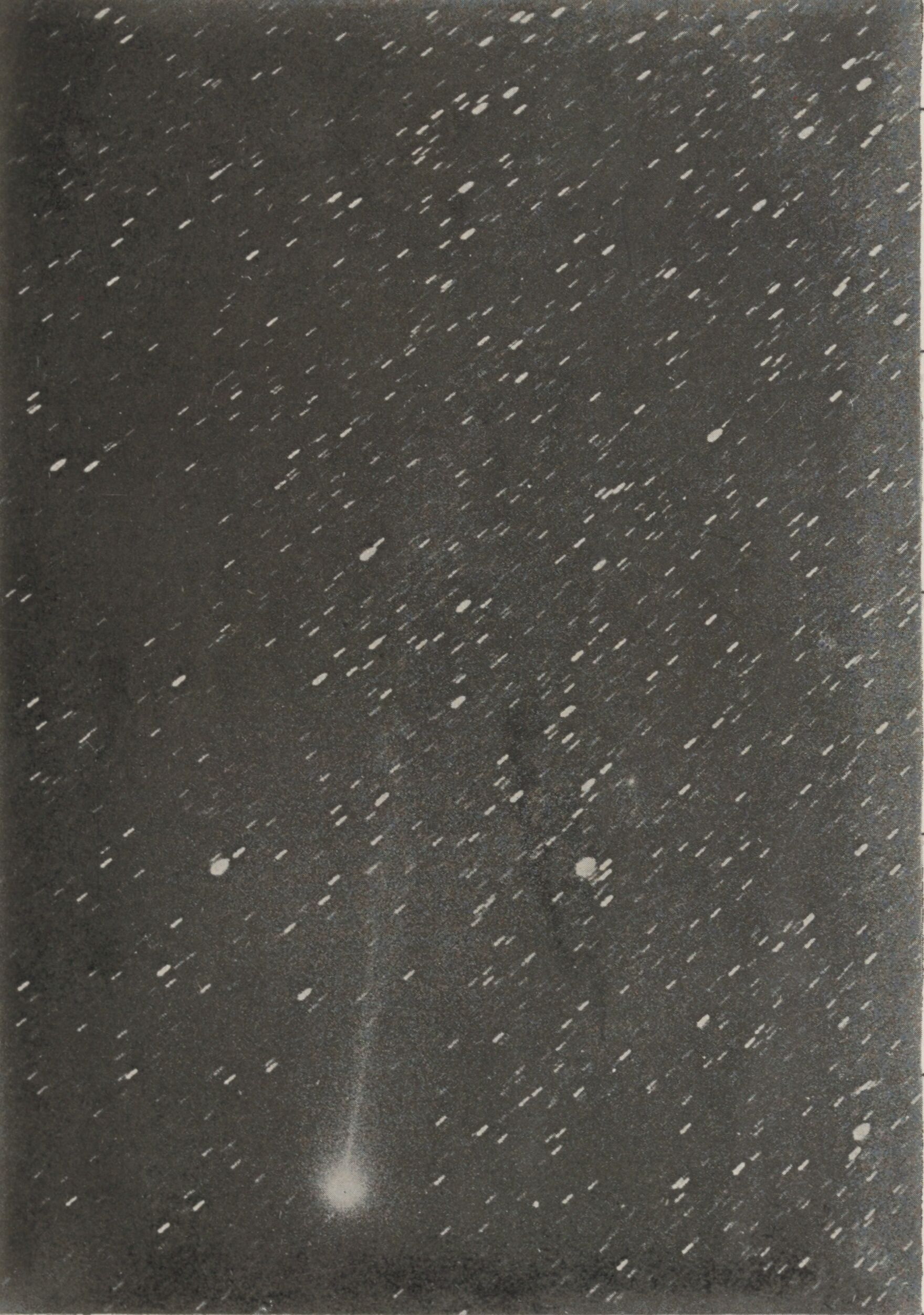
- Comet Kiess photographed by Ferdinand Quénisset from the Flammarion Observatory on 29 July 1911

Discovery
- Discovered by: Carl Clarence Kiess
- Discovery site: Lick Observatory
- Discovery date: 6 July 1911

Designations
- Alternative designations: 1911 II, 1911b

Orbital characteristics
- Epoch: 30 July 1911 (JD 2419247.5)
- Observation arc: 71 days
- Number of observations: 86
- Aphelion: 366 AU
- Perihelion: 0.684 AU
- Semi-major axis: 184 AU
- Eccentricity: 0.9963
- Orbital period: 2490±125 years ≈2067 years (barycentric)
- Inclination: 148.42°
- Longitude of ascending node: 158.67°
- Argument of periapsis: 110.37°
- Last perihelion: 30 June 1911
- T_{Jupiter}: -0.844
- Earth MOID: 0.003 AU

Physical characteristics
- Mean radius: 0.867 km (0.539 mi) (Note: Calculated mean radius using the formula: $\log_{10}\,(\,R\,)\ =\;0.9 +\;0.13 (\,H\,)$ Where $\,H\,$ is the comet's absolute total magnitude (M1))
- Comet total magnitude (M1): 7.4
- Apparent magnitude: 5.0 (1911 apparition)

C/1911 N1 (Kiess) is a non-periodic comet discovered by Carl Clarence Kiess on 6 July 1911. The comet has been identified as the parent body of the Aurigids meteor shower.

== Observational history ==
The comet was discovered by Carl Clarence Kiess at Lick Observatory on a photographic plate obtained in the morning hours of 6 July 1911 with the Crocker photographic telescope. The comet appeared as a distorted nebulous object with a short tail. The presence of the comet was confirmed visually the next day. The comet had a well condensed nucleus and a faint tail. In photographs the tail was four degrees long. The comet then was of seventh magnitude and moving southwards. A preliminary orbit suggested the comet was past its perihelion upon discovery and it was calculated that it would approach Earth at a distance of 0.27 AU (40 million km; 25 million mi) on 20 August. On 19 August the comet was reported to be visible with naked eye, peaking at an estimated apparent magnitude of 5.

The comet had been suggested in 1911 to be the return of comet C/1790 A1 (Herschel), also known by its old designation, 1790 I. However, further calculations revealed that the orbit of comet Kiess had an eccentricity too high for an orbital period of 122 years, with the orbit calculated by Louis Lindsey in 1932 indicating an orbital period of 1,903 years.

== Meteor shower ==
The comet has been identified as the parent body of the Aurigids meteor shower that takes place between 25 August and 8 September every year, usually with a zenithal hourly rate (ZHR) of 7 meteors per hour. The shower has been known to have experienced outbursts in 1935, 1986, 1994, and 2007. The 2007 outburst was the first predicted for a shower associated with a long period comet and reached a peak ZHR of about 200 meteors per hour. The annual shower and the outbursts have slightly different radiant points, indicating the presence of different components in the debris stream.
