= Auriga =

Constellation in the northern celestial hemisphere

- Constellation
- List of stars in Auriga
- Abbreviation: Aur
- Genitive: Aurigae
- Pronunciation: /ɔːˈraɪɡə/ Auríga; genitive /ɔːˈraɪdʒiː/
- Symbolism: the Charioteer
- Right ascension: 04^{h} 37^{m} 54.4293^{s}–07^{h} 30^{m} 56.1899^{s}
- Declination: 56.1648331°–27.8913116°
- Area: 657 sq. deg. (21st)
- Main stars: 5, 8
- Bayer/Flamsteed stars: 65
- Stars brighter than 3.00^{m}: 4
- Stars within 10.00 pc (32.62 ly): 2
- Brightest star: Capella (α Aur) (0.08^{m})
- Nearest star: QY Aur
- Messier objects: 3
- Meteor showers: Aurigids; Delta Aurigids
- Bordering constellations: Camelopardalis; Perseus; Taurus; Gemini; Lynx
- Visible at latitudes between +90° and −40°. Best visible at 21:00 (9 p.m.) during the month of February.

Auriga is a constellation in the northern celestial hemisphere. It is one of the 88 modern constellations; it was among the 48 constellations listed by the 2nd-century astronomer Ptolemy. Its name is Latin for '(the) charioteer', associating it with various mythological beings, including Erichthonius and Myrtilus. In Chinese mythology, its stars were part of several constellations, including the celestial emperors' chariots.

Auriga is most prominent during winter evenings in the Northern Hemisphere, as are five other constellations that have stars in the Winter Hexagon asterism. Because of its northern declination, Auriga is only visible in its entirety as far south as −34°; for observers farther south it lies partially or fully below the horizon. A large constellation, with an area of 657 square degrees, it is half the size of the largest, Hydra.

Its brightest star, Capella, is an unusual multiple star system and amongst the brightest stars in the night sky. Beta Aurigae is an interesting variable star in the constellation; Epsilon Aurigae, a nearby eclipsing binary with an unusually long period, has been studied intensively. Because of its position near the winter Milky Way, Auriga has many bright open clusters in its borders, including M36, M37, and M38, popular targets for amateur astronomers. In addition, it has one prominent nebula, the Flaming Star Nebula, associated with the variable star AE Aurigae. Auriga is also home to the radiant for the Aurigids, Zeta Aurigids, Delta Aurigids, and the hypothesized Iota Aurigids.

== History and mythology ==
The first record of Auriga's stars was in Mesopotamia as a constellation called GAM, representing a scimitar or crook. However, this may have represented just Capella (Alpha Aurigae) or the modern constellation as a whole; this figure was alternatively called Gamlum or MUL.GAM in the MUL.APIN. The crook of Auriga stood for a goat-herd or shepherd. It was formed from most of the stars of the modern constellation; all of the bright stars were included except for Elnath, traditionally assigned to both Taurus and Auriga. Later, Bedouin astronomers created constellations that were groups of animals, where each star represented one animal. The stars of Auriga comprised a herd of goats, an association also present in Greek mythology. The association with goats carried into the Greek astronomical tradition, though it later became associated with a charioteer along with the shepherd.

In Greek mythology, Auriga is often identified as the hero Erichthonius of Athens, the chthonic son of Hephaestus who was raised by the goddess Athena. Erichthonius was generally credited to be the inventor of the quadriga, the four-horse chariot, which he used in the battle against the usurper Amphictyon, the event that made Erichthonius the king of Athens. His chariot was created in the image of the Sun's chariot, the reason Zeus placed him in the heavens. The Athenian hero then dedicated himself to Athena and, soon after, Zeus raised him into the night sky in honor of his ingenuity and heroic deeds.

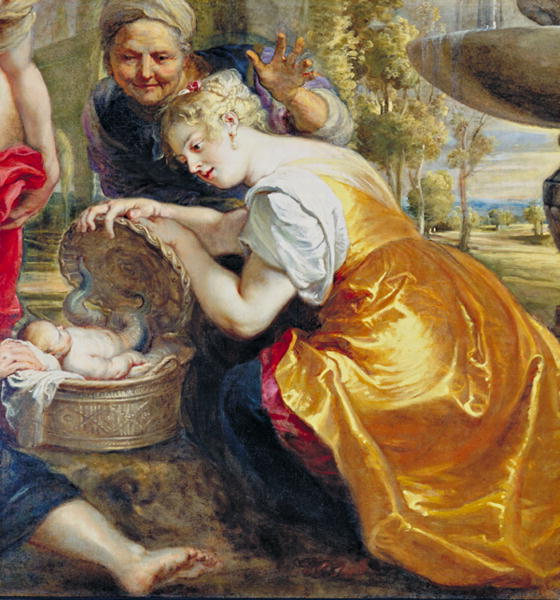
A painting by Peter Paul Rubens entitled Finding of Erichthonius; Erichthonius and Auriga are often associated.

Auriga, however, is sometimes described as Myrtilus, who was Hermes's son and the charioteer of Oenomaus. The association of Auriga and Myrtilus is supported by depictions of the constellation, which rarely show a chariot. Myrtilus's chariot was destroyed in a race intended for suitors to win the heart of Oenomaus's daughter Hippodamia. Myrtilus earned his position in the sky when Hippodamia's successful suitor, Pelops, killed him, despite his complicity in helping Pelops win her hand. After his death, Myrtilus's father Hermes placed him in the sky. Yet another mythological association of Auriga is Theseus's son Hippolytus. He was ejected from Athens after he refused the romantic advances of his stepmother Phaedra, who committed suicide as a result. He was killed when his chariot was wrecked, but revived by Asclepius.

In late antiquity two Latin poets, Claudian and Nonnus, identified Auriga as Phaethon in their works. In the common version of the myth, Phaethon, the son of the sun Helios, attempted to drive his father's chariot for a day. Unable to control the chariot, Phaethon veered off course, causing chaos on the earth below. In order to avert further disaster, Zeus killed Phaethon with a thunderbolt and his burned remains fell to the earth, landing in a river. Claudian and Nonnus add to this story that Helios then placed Phaethon in the sky as the constellation Auriga. Regardless of Auriga's specific representation, it is possible that the constellation was created by the ancient Greeks to commemorate the importance of the chariot in their society.

An incidental appearance of Auriga in Greek mythology is as the limbs of Medea's brother. In the myth of Jason and the Argonauts, as they journeyed home, Medea killed her brother and dismembered him, flinging the parts of his body into the sea, represented by the Milky Way. Each individual star represents a different limb.

Capella is associated with the mythological she-goat Amalthea, who breast-fed the infant Zeus. It forms an asterism with the stars Epsilon Aurigae, Zeta Aurigae, and Eta Aurigae, the latter two of which are known as the Haedi (the Kids). Though most often associated with Amalthea, Capella has sometimes been associated with Amalthea's owner, a nymph. The myth of the nymph says that the goat's hideous appearance, resembling a Gorgon, was partially responsible for the Titans' defeat, because Zeus skinned the goat and wore it as his aegis. The asterism containing the goat and kids had been a separate constellation; however, Ptolemy merged the Charioteer and the Goats in the 2nd-century Almagest. Before that, Capella was sometimes seen as its own constellation—by Pliny the Elder and Manilius—called Capra, Caper, or Hircus, all of which relate to its status as the "goat star". Zeta Aurigae and Eta Aurigae were first called the "Kids" by Cleostratus, an ancient Greek astronomer.

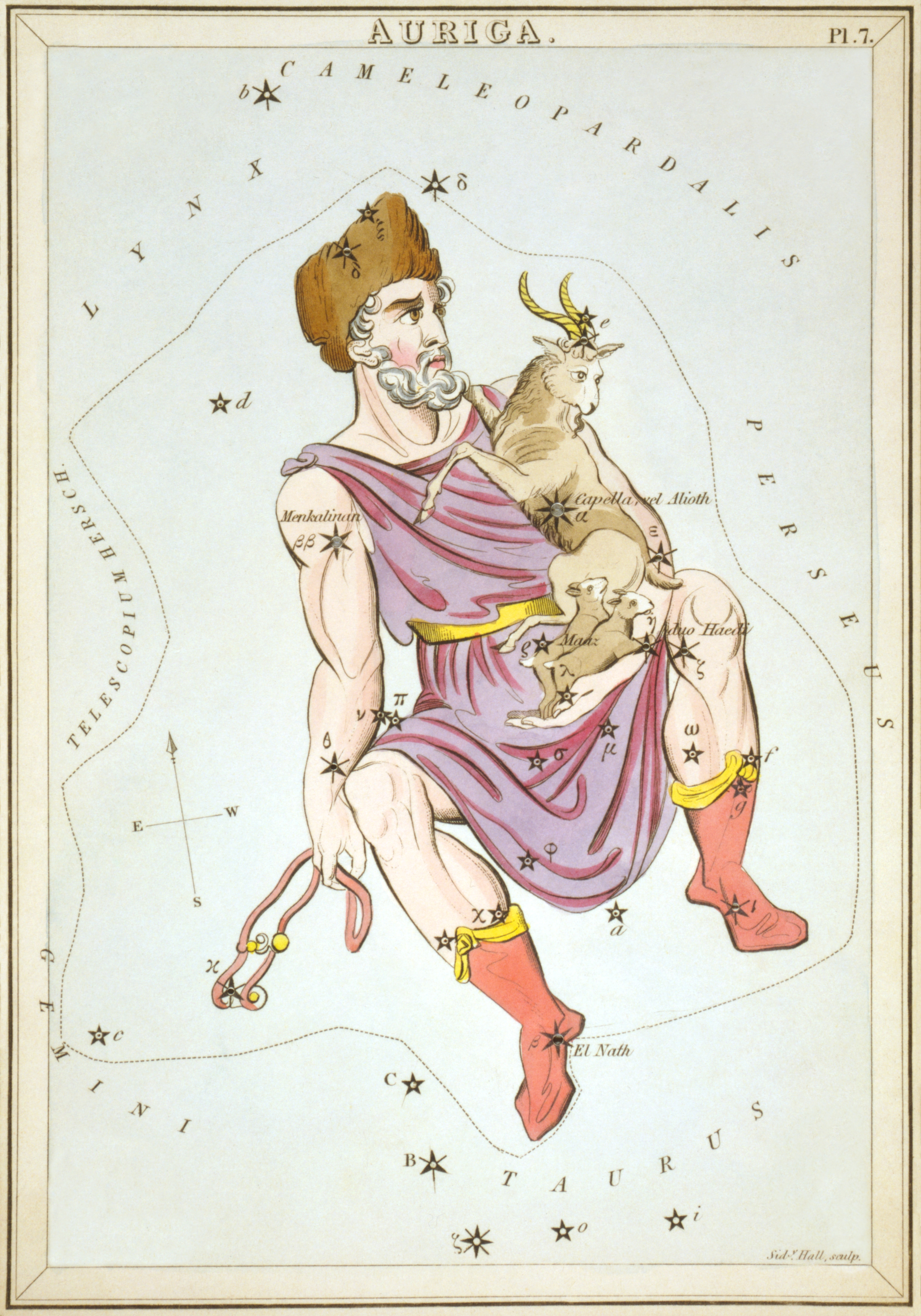
Auriga carrying the goat and kids as depicted in Urania's Mirror, a set of constellation cards illustrated by Sidney Hall, London c. 1825.

Traditionally, illustrations of Auriga represent it as a chariot and its driver. The charioteer holds a goat over his left shoulder and has two kids under his left arm; he holds the reins to the chariot in his right hand. However, depictions of Auriga have been inconsistent over the years. The reins in his right hand have also been drawn as a whip, though Capella is almost always over his left shoulder and the Kids under his left arm. The 1488 atlas Hyginus deviated from this typical depiction by showing a four-wheeled cart driven by Auriga, who holds the reins of two oxen, a horse, and a zebra. Jacob Micyllus depicted Auriga in his Hyginus of 1535 as a charioteer with a two-wheeled cart, powered by two horses and two oxen. Arabic and Turkish depictions of Auriga varied wildly from those of the European Renaissance; one Turkish atlas depicted the stars of Auriga as a mule, called Mulus clitellatus by Johann Bayer. One unusual representation of Auriga, from 17th-century France, showed Auriga as Adam kneeling on the Milky Way, with a goat wrapped around his shoulders.

Occasionally, Auriga is seen not as the Charioteer but as Bellerophon, the mortal rider of Pegasus who dared to approach Mount Olympus. In this version of the tale, Jupiter pitied Bellerophon for his foolishness and placed him in the stars.

Oxford research finds it likely the group was equally named Agitator in about the 15th century and provides a quotation as late as 1623, from a Gerard de Malynes multi-topic work. Some of the stars of Auriga were incorporated into a now-defunct constellation called Telescopium Herschelii. This constellation was introduced by Maximilian Hell to honor William Herschel's discovery of Uranus. Originally, it included two constellations, Tubus Hershelii Major [sic], in Gemini, Lynx, and Auriga, and Tubus Hershelii Minor [sic] in Orion and Taurus; both represented Herschel's telescopes. Johann Bode combined Hell's constellations into Telescopium Herschelii in 1801, located mostly in Auriga.

Since the time of Ptolemy, Auriga has remained a constellation and is officially recognized by the International Astronomical Union, although like all modern constellations, it is now defined as a specific region of the sky that includes both the ancient pattern and the surrounding stars. In 1922, the IAU designated its recommended three-letter abbreviation, "Aur". The official boundaries of Auriga were created in 1930 by Belgian astronomer Eugène Delporte as a polygon of 20 segments. Its right ascension is between 4^{h} 37.5^{m} and 7^{h} 30.5^{m} and its declination is between 27.9° and 56.2° in the equatorial coordinate system.

=== In non-Western astronomy ===
The stars of Auriga were incorporated into several Chinese constellations. Wuche, the five chariots of the celestial emperors and the representation of the grain harvest, was a constellation formed by Alpha Aurigae, Beta Aurigae, Beta Tauri, Theta Aurigae, and Iota Aurigae. Sanzhu or Zhu was one of three constellations which represented poles for horses to be tethered. They were formed by the triplets of Epsilon, Zeta, and Eta Aurigae; Nu, Tau, and Upsilon Aurigae; and Chi and 26 Aurigae, with one other undetermined star. Xianchi, the pond where the sun set and Tianhuang, a pond, bridge, or pier, were other constellations in Auriga, though the stars that composed them are undetermined. Zuoqi, representing chairs for the emperor and other officials, was made up of nine stars in the east of the constellation. Bagu, a constellation mostly formed from stars in Camelopardalis representing different types of crops, included the northern stars of Delta and Xi Aurigae.

In ancient Hindu astronomy, Capella represented the heart of Brahma and was important religiously. Ancient Peruvian peoples saw Capella, called Colca, as a star intimately connected to the affairs of shepherds.

In Brazil, the Bororo people incorporate the stars of Auriga into a massive constellation representing a caiman; its southern stars represent the end of the animal's tail. The eastern portion of Taurus is the rest of the tail, while Orion is its body and Lepus is the head. This constellation arose because of the prominence of caymans in daily Amazonian life. There is evidence that Capella was significant to the Aztec people, as the Late Classic site Monte Albán has a marker for the star's heliacal rising. Indigenous peoples of California and Nevada also noticed the bright pattern of Auriga's stars. To them, the constellation's bright stars formed a curve that was represented in crescent-shaped petroglyphs. The indigenous Pawnee of North America recognized a constellation with the same major stars as modern Auriga: Alpha, Beta, Gamma (Beta Tauri), Theta, and Iota Aurigae.

The people of the Marshall Islands featured Auriga in the myth of Dümur, which tells the story of the creation of the sky. Antares in Scorpius represents Dümur, the oldest son of the stars' mother, and the Pleiades represent her youngest son. The mother of the stars, Ligedaner, is represented by Capella; she lived on the island of Alinablab. She told her sons that the first to reach an eastern island would become the King of the Stars, and asked Dümur to let her come in his canoe. He refused, as did each of her sons in turn, except for Pleiades. Pleiades won the race with the help of Ligedaner, and became the King of the Stars. Elsewhere in the central Caroline Islands, Capella was called Jefegen uun (variations include efang alul, evang-el-ul, and iefangel uul), meaning "north of Aldebaran". Different names were noted for Auriga and Capella in Eastern Pacific societies. On Pukapuka, the figure of modern Auriga was called Te Wale-o-Tutakaiolo ("The house of Tutakaiolo"); in the Society Islands, it was called Faa-nui ("Great Valley"). Capella itself was called Tahi-anii ("Unique Sovereign") in the Societies. Hoku-lei was the name for Capella but may have been the name for the whole constellation; the name means "Star-wreath" and refers to one of the wives of the Pleiades, called Makalii.

The stars of Auriga feature in Inuit constellations. Quturjuuk, meaning "collar-bones", was a constellation that included Capella (Alpha Aurigae), Menkalinan (Beta Aurigae), Pollux (Beta Geminorum), and Castor (Alpha Geminorum). Its rising signalled that the constellation Aagjuuk, made up of Altair (Alpha Aquilae), Tarazed (Gamma Aquilae), and sometimes Alshain (Beta Aquilae), would rise soon. Aagjuuk, which represented the dawn following the winter solstice, was an incredibly important constellation in the Inuit mythos. It was also used for navigation and time-keeping at night.

== Features ==
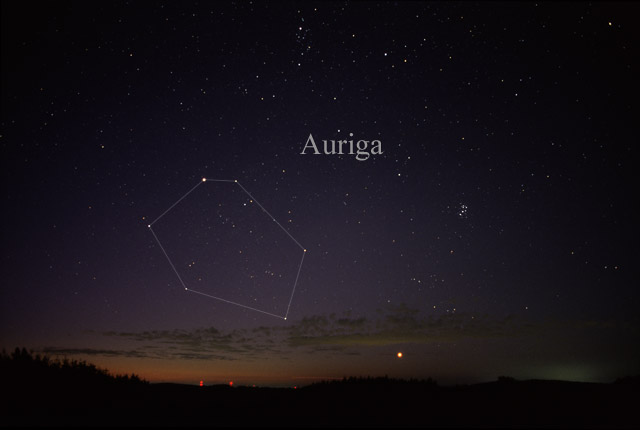
The constellation Auriga as it can be seen by the naked eye.

=== Stars ===
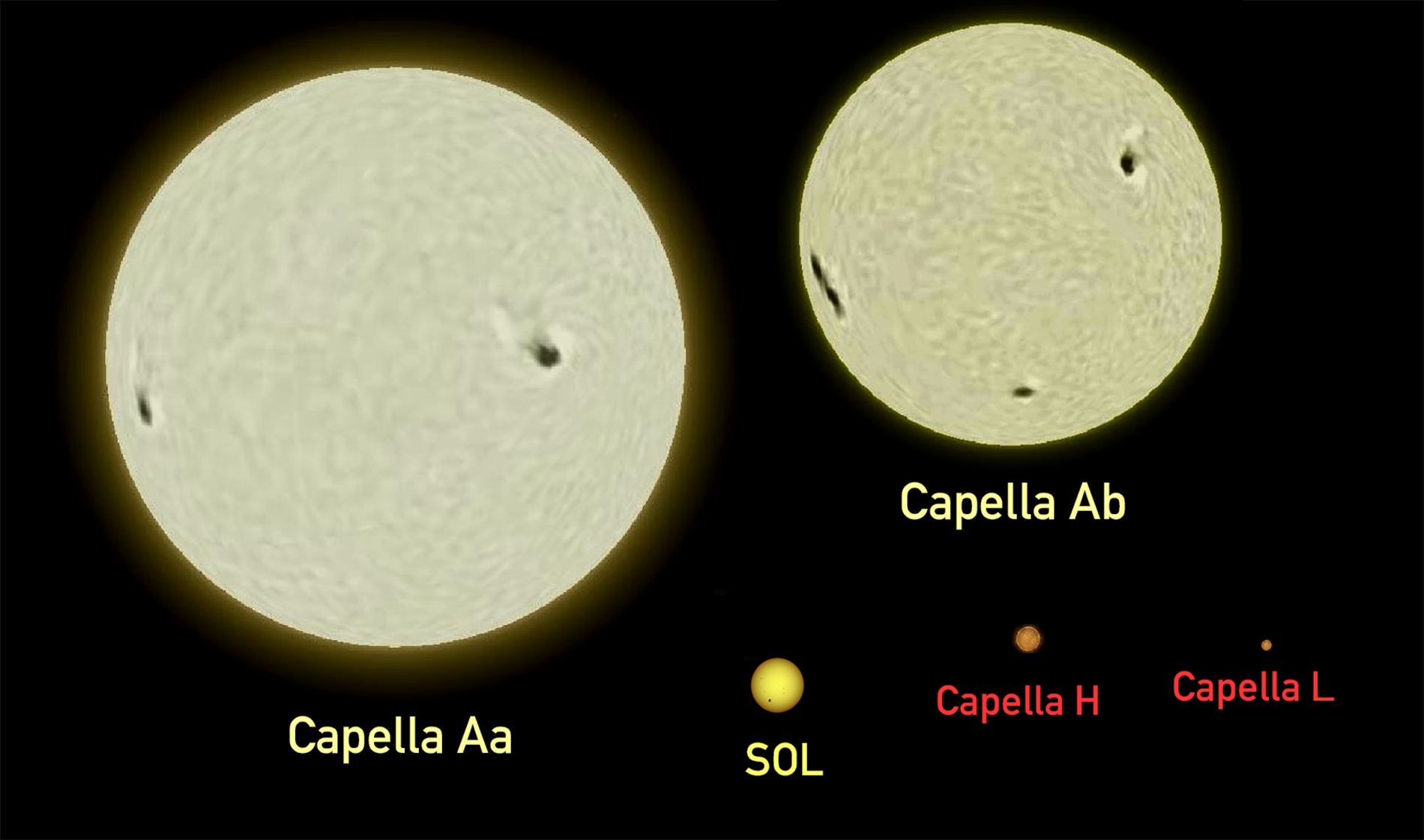
A size comparison of the four stars in the Capella system and the Sun.

==== Bright stars ====
Alpha Aurigae (Capella), the brightest star in Auriga, is a G8III class star (G-type giant) 43 light-years away and the sixth-brightest star in the night sky at magnitude 0.08. Its traditional name is a reference to its mythological position as Amalthea; it is sometimes called the "Goat Star". Capella's names all point to this mythology. In Arabic, Capella was called al-'Ayyuq, meaning "the goat", and in Sumerian, it was called mul.ÁŠ.KAR, "the goat star". On Ontong Java, Capella was called ngahalapolu. Capella is a spectroscopic binary with a period of 104 days; the components are both yellow giants, more specifically, the primary is a G-type star and the secondary is between a G-type and F-type star in its evolution. The secondary is formally classified as a G0III class star (G-type giant). The primary has a radius of 11.87 solar radii (R_{☉}) and a mass of 2.47 solar masses (M_{☉}); the secondary has a radius of 8.75 R_{☉} and a mass of 2.44 M_{☉}. The two components are separated by 110 million kilometers, almost 75% of the distance between the Earth and the Sun. The star's status as a binary was discovered in 1899 at the Lick Observatory; its period was determined in 1919 by J.A. Anderson at the 100-inch Mt. Wilson Observatory telescope. It appears with a golden-yellow hue, though Ptolemy and Giovanni Battista Riccioli both described its color as red, a phenomenon attributed not to a change in Capella's color but to the idiosyncrasies of their color sensitivities. Capella has an absolute magnitude of 0.3 and a luminosity of 160 times the luminosity of the Sun, or 160 L_{☉} (the primary is 90 L_{☉} and the secondary is 70 L_{☉}). It may be loosely associated with the Hyades, an open cluster in Taurus, because of their similar proper motion. Capella has one more companion, Capella H, which is a pair of red dwarf stars located 11,000 astronomical units (0.17 light-years) from the main pair.

Beta Aurigae (Menkalinan, Menkarlina) is a bright A2IV class star (A-type subgiant). Its Arabic name comes from the phrase mankib dhu al-'inan, meaning "shoulder of the charioteer" and is a reference to Beta Aurigae's location in the constellation. Menkalinan is 81 light-years away and has a magnitude of 1.90. Like Epsilon Aurigae, it is an eclipsing binary star that varies in magnitude by 0.1^{m}. The two components are blue-white stars that have a period of 3.96 days. Its double nature was revealed spectroscopically in 1890 by Antonia Maury, making it the second spectroscopic binary discovered, and its variable nature was discovered photometrically 20 years later by Joel Stebbins. Menkalinan has an absolute magnitude of 0.6 and a luminosity of 50 L_{☉}. The component of its motion in the direction of Earth is 18 kilometres (11 mi) per second. Beta Aurigae may be associated with a stream of about 70 stars including Delta Leonis and Alpha Ophiuchi; the proper motion of this group is comparable to that of the Ursa Major Moving Group, though the connection is only hypothesized. Besides its close eclipsing companion, Menkalinan has two other stars associated with it. One is an unrelated optical companion, discovered in 1783 by William Herschel; it has a magnitude of 10.5 and has a separation of 184 arcseconds. The other is likely associated gravitationally with the primary, as determined by their common proper motion. This 14th-magnitude star was discovered in 1901 by Edward Emerson Barnard. It has a separation of 12.6 arcseconds, and is around 350 astronomical units from the primary.

==== Other bright stars ====
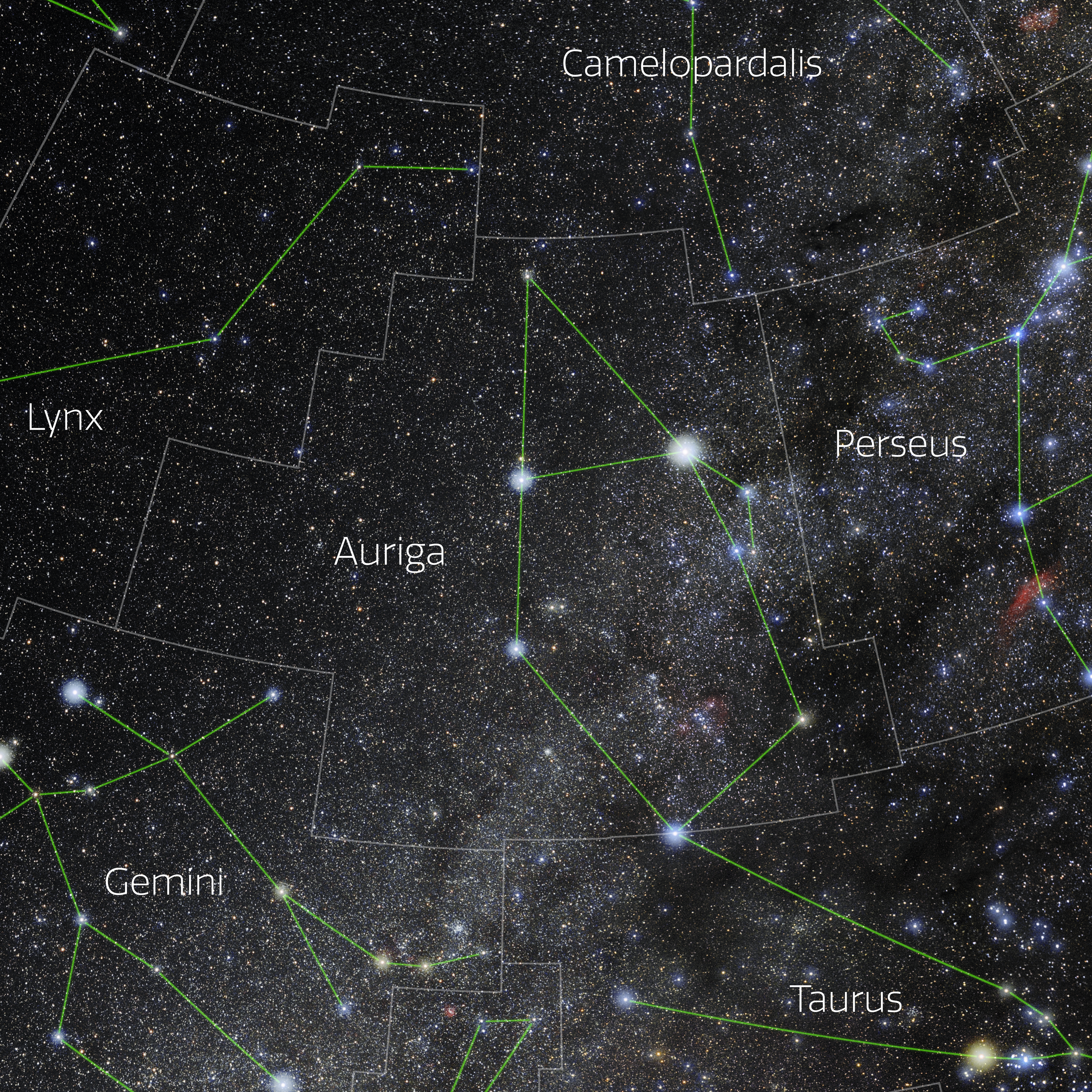
The constellation Auriga showing the IAU boundaries, the constellation stick figure, and labels for its brightest stars. Astrophotograph by Eckhard Slawik, from NOIRLab's 88 Constellations project.

Besides particularly bright stars of Alpha and Beta Aurigae, Auriga has many dimmer naked-eye visible stars.

Gamma Aurigae, now known under its once co-name Beta Tauri (El Nath, Alnath) is a B7III class star (B-type giant). At about +1.65 it would rank a clear third in apparent magnitude if still co-placed in Auriga. It is a mercury-manganese star, with some large signatures of heavy elements.

Iota Aurigae, also called Hasseleh and Kabdhilinan, is a K3II class star (K-type bright giant) of magnitude 2.69; it is about 494 light-years away from Earth. It evolved from a B-type star to K-type over the estimated 30–45 million years since its birth. It has an absolute magnitude of −2.3 and a luminosity of 700 L_{☉}. It is classed as a particularly luminous bright giant but its light is in part "extinguished" (blocked) by intragalactic dust clouds; astronomers estimate by these it appears 0.6 magnitudes fainter. It is also a hybrid star, an x-ray producing giant star that emits x-rays from its corona and has a cool stellar wind. Though its proper motion is just 0.02 arcseconds per year, it has a radial velocity of 10.5 miles (16.9 km) per second in recession. The traditional name Kabdhilinan, sometimes shortened to "Alkab", comes from the Arabic phrase al-kab dh'il inan, meaning "shoulder of the rein holder". Iota may end as a supernova, but because it is close to the mass limit for such stars, it may instead become a white dwarf.

Delta Aurigae, also known as Bagu the northernmost bright star in Auriga, is a K0III-type star (K-type giant), 126 light-years from Earth and approximately 1.3 billion years old. It has a magnitude of 3.72, an absolute magnitude of 0.2, and a luminosity of 60 L_{☉}. About 12 times the radius of the Sun, Delta weighs only two solar masses and rotates with a period of almost one year. Though it is often listed as a single star, it actually has three very widely spaced optical companions. One is a double star of magnitude 11, two arcminutes apart; the other is a star of magnitude 10, three arcminutes apart.

Lambda Aurigae (Al Hurr) is a G1.5IV-V-type star (G-type star intermediate between a subgiant and main-sequence star) of magnitude 4.71. It has an absolute magnitude of 4.4 and is 41 light-years from Earth. It has very weak emissions in the infrared spectrum, like Epsilon Aurigae. In photometric observations of Epsilon, an unusual variable, Lambda is commonly used as a comparison star. It is reaching the end of its hydrogen-fusing lifespan at an age of 6.2 billion years. It also has an unusually high radial velocity at 83 km/second. Though older than the Sun, it is similar in many ways; its mass is 1.07 solar masses, a radius of 1.3 solar radii, and a rotational period of 26 days. However, it differs from the Sun in its metallicity; its iron content is 1.15 times that of the Sun and it has relatively less nitrogen and carbon. Like Delta, it has several optical companions and is often categorized as a single star. The brightest companions are of magnitude 10, separated by 175 and 203 arcseconds. The dimmer companions are of magnitude 13 and 14, 87 and 310 arcseconds from Lambda, respectively.

Nu Aurigae is a G9.5III (G-type giant) star of magnitude 3.97, 230 light-years from Earth. It has a luminosity of 60 L_{☉} and an absolute magnitude of 0.2. Nu is a giant star with a radius of 20–21 solar radii and a mass of approximately 3 solar masses. It may technically be a binary star; its companion, sometimes listed as optical and separated by 56 arcseconds, is a dwarf star of spectral type K6 and magnitude 11.4. Its period is more than 120,000 years and it orbits at least 3,700 AU from the primary.

Star	Spectral class	Apparent magnitude	Absolute magnitude	Distance (light-years)
Kappa Aurigae	G8.5IIIb	4.25	0.3	177
Pi Aurigae	M3II	4.26	−2.4	758
Tau Aurigae	G8III	4.52	0.3	206
Upsilon Aurigae	M0III	4.74	−0.5	526
Chi Aurigae	B4Ib	4.76	−6.3	3032
2 Aurigae	K3III	4.78	−0.2	604
Mu Aurigae	A4m	4.86	1.8	153
Sigma Aurigae	K4III	4.89	−0.3	466
Omega Aurigae	A1V	4.94	0.6	171
Xi Aurigae	A2V	4.99	0.8	233
9 Aurigae	F0V	5.00	2.6	86

==== Eclipsing binary stars ====
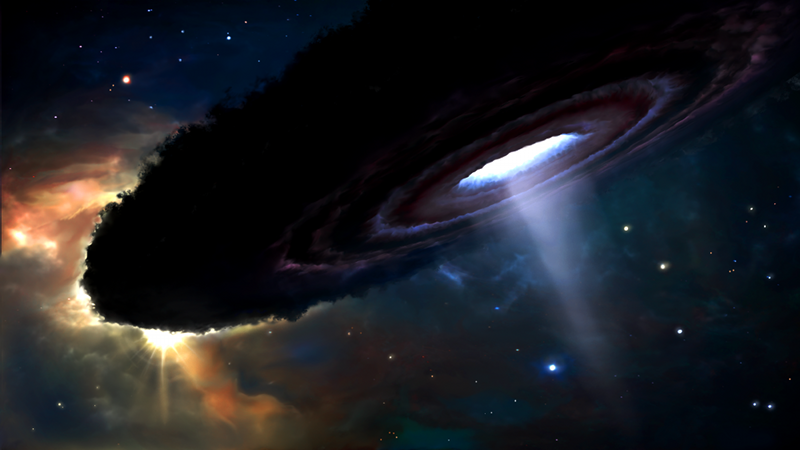
An artist's rendering of the Epsilon Aurigae system.

The most prominent variable star in Auriga is Epsilon Aurigae (Almaaz), an F0 class eclipsing binary star with an unusually long period of 27 years; its last minima occurred in 1982–1984 and 2009–2011. The distance to the system is disputed, variously cited as 4600 and 2,170 light-years. The primary is a white supergiant, and the secondary may be itself a binary star within a large dusty disk. Its maximum magnitude is 3.0, but it stays at a minimum magnitude of 3.8 for around a year; its most recent eclipse began in 2009. The primary has an absolute magnitude of −8.5 and an unusually high luminosity of 200,000 L_{☉}, the reason it appears so bright at such a great distance. Epsilon Aurigae is the longest-period eclipsing binary currently known. The first observed eclipse of Epsilon Aurigae occurred in 1821, though its variable status was not confirmed until the eclipse of 1847–48. From that time forward, many theories were put forth as to the nature of the eclipsing component. Epsilon Aurigae has a noneclipsing component, which is visible as a 14th magnitude companion separated from the primary by 28.6 arcseconds. It was discovered by Sherburne Wesley Burnham in 1891 at the Dearborn Observatory, and is about 0.5 light-years from the primary.

Another eclipsing binary in Auriga, part of the Haedi asterism with Eta Aurigae, is Zeta Aurigae (Saclateni), an eclipsing binary star at a distance of 776 light-years with a period of 2 years and 8 months. It has an absolute magnitude of −2.3. The primary is an orange-hued K5II-type star (K-type bright giant) and the secondary is a smaller blue star similar to Regulus; its period is 972 days. The secondary is a B7V-type star, a B-type main-sequence star. Zeta Aurigae's maximum magnitude is 3.7 and its minimum magnitude is 4.0. The full eclipse of the small blue star by the orange giant lasts 38 days, with two partial phases of 32 days at the beginning and end. The primary has a diameter of 150 D_{☉} and a luminosity of 700 L_{☉}; the secondary has a diameter of 4 D_{☉} and a luminosity of 140 L_{☉}. Zeta Aurigae was spectroscopically determined to be a double star by Antonia Maury in 1897 and was confirmed as a binary star in 1908 by William Wallace Campbell. The two stars orbit each other about 500,000,000 miles (800,000,000 km) apart. Zeta Aurigae is moving away from Earth at a rate of 8 miles (13 km) per second. The second of the two Haedi or "Kids" is Eta Aurigae, a B3 class star located 243 light-years from Earth with a magnitude of 3.17. It is a B3V class star, meaning that it is a blue-white hued main-sequence star. Eta Aurigae has an absolute magnitude of −1.7 and a luminosity of 450 L_{☉}. Eta Aurigae is moving away from Earth at a rate of 4.5 miles (7.2 km) per second.

T Aurigae (Nova Aurigae 1891) was a nova discovered at magnitude 5.0 on January 23, 1892, by Thomas David Anderson. It became visible to the naked eye by December 10, 1891, as shown on photographic plates examined after the nova's discovery. It then brightened by a factor of 2.5 from December 11 to December 20, when it reached a maximum magnitude of 4.4. T Aurigae faded slowly in January and February 1892, then faded quickly during March and April, reaching a magnitude of 15 in late April. However, its brightness began to increase in August, reaching magnitude 9.5, where it stayed until 1895. Over the subsequent two years, its brightness decreased to 11.5, and by 1903, it was approximately 14th magnitude. By 1925, it had reached its current magnitude of 15.5. When the nova was discovered, its spectrum showed material moving at a high speed towards Earth. However, when the spectrum was examined again in August 1892, it appeared to be a planetary nebula. Observations at the Lick Observatory by Edward Emerson Barnard showed it to be disc-shaped, with clear nebulosity in a diameter of 3 arcseconds. The shell had a diameter of 12 arcseconds in 1943. T Aurigae is classified as a slow nova, similar to DQ Herculis. Like DQ Herculis, WZ Sagittae, Nova Persei 1901 and Nova Aquilae 1918, it is a very close binary with a very short period. T Aurigae's period of 4.905 hours is comparable to DQ Herculis's period of 4.65 hours, and it has a partial eclipse period of 40 minutes.

==== Other variable stars ====
There are many other variable stars of different types in Auriga. ψ^{1} Aurigae is an orange-hued supergiant, which ranges between magnitudes 4.8 and 5.7, though not with a regular period. It has a spectral class of K5Iab, an average magnitude of 4.91, and an absolute magnitude of −5.7. It lies 3,976 light-years from Earth. RT Aurigae is a Cepheid variable which ranges between magnitudes 5.0 and 5.8 over a period of 3.7 days. A yellow-white supergiant, it lies at a distance of 1,600 light-years. It was discovered to be variable by English amateur T.H. Astbury in 1905. It has a spectral class of F81bv, meaning that it is an F-type supergiant star. RX Aurigae is a Cepheid variable as well; it varies in magnitude from a minimum of 8.0 to a maximum of 7.3; its spectral class is G0Iabv. It has a period of 11.62 days. RW Aurigae is the prototype of its class of irregular variable stars. Its variability was discovered in 1906 by Lydia Ceraski at the Moscow Observatory. RW Aurigae's spectrum indicates a turbulent stellar atmosphere, and has prominent emission lines of calcium and hydrogen. Its spectral type is G5V:e. SS Aurigae is an SS Cygni-type variable star, classified as an explosive dwarf. Discovered by Emil Silbernagel in 1907, it is almost always at its minimum magnitude of 15, but brightens to a maximum up to 60 times brighter than the minimum an average of every 55 days, though the period can range from 50 days to more than 100 days. It takes about 24 hours for the star to go from its minimum to maximum magnitude. SS Aurigae is a very close binary star with a period of 4 hours and 20 minutes. Both components are small subdwarf stars; there has been dispute in the scientific community about which star originates the outbursts. UU Aurigae is a variable red giant star at a distance of 2,000 light-years. It has a period of approximately 234 days and ranges between magnitudes 5.0 and 7.0.

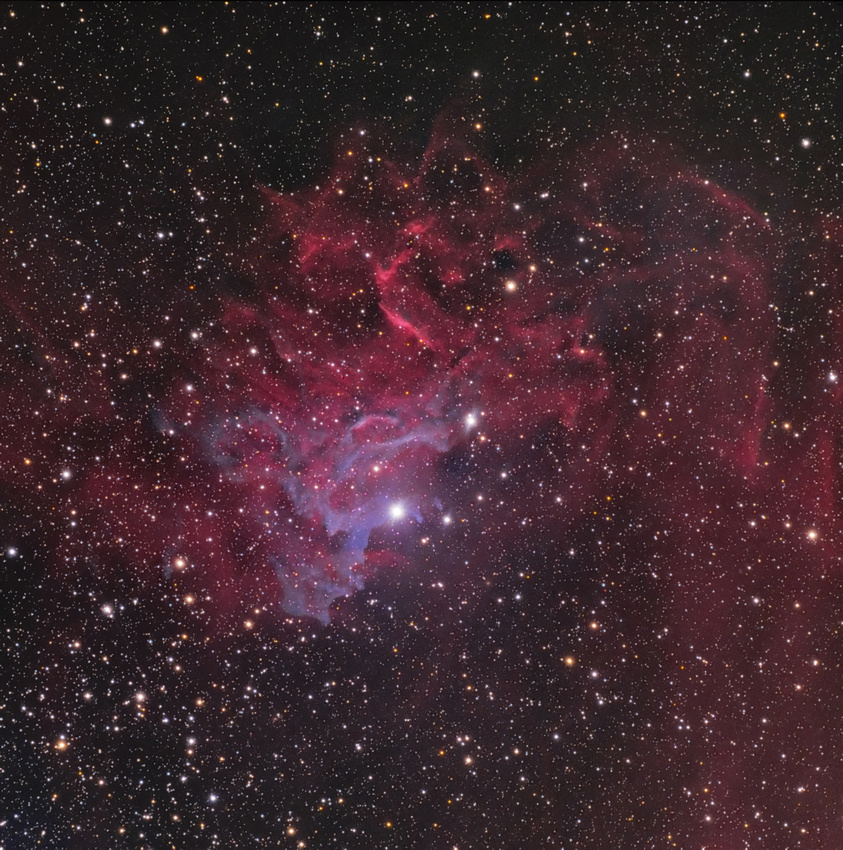
The Flaming Star Nebula (IC 405), and its neighbor IC 410, along with AE Aurigae, which illuminates the nebula

AE Aurigae is a blue-hued main-sequence variable star. It is normally of magnitude 6.0, but its magnitude varies irregularly. AE Aurigae is associated with the 9-light-year-wide Flaming Star Nebula (IC 405), which it illuminates. However, AE Aurigae likely entered the nebula only recently, as determined through the discrepancy between the radial velocities of the star and the nebula, 36 miles (58 km) per second and 13 miles (21 km) per second, respectively. It has been hypothesized that AE Aurigae is a "runaway star" from the young cluster in the Orion Nebula, leaving the cluster approximately 2.7 million years ago. It is similar to 53 Arietis and Mu Columbae, other runaway stars from the Orion cluster. Its spectral class is O9.5Ve, meaning that it is an O-type main-sequence star. The Flaming Star Nebula, is located near IC 410 in the celestial sphere. IC 410 obtained its name from its appearance in long exposure astrophotographs; it has extensive filaments that make AE Aurigae appear to be on fire.

There are four Mira variable stars in Auriga: R Aurigae, UV Aurigae, U Aurigae, and X Aurigae, all of which are type M stars. More specifically, R Aurigae is of type M7III, UV Aurigae is of type C6 (a carbon star), U Aurigae is of type M9, and X Aurigae is of type K2. R Aurigae, with a period of 457.5 days, ranges in magnitude from a minimum of 13.9 to a maximum of 6.7. UV Aurigae, with a period of 394.4 days, ranges in magnitude from a minimum of 10.6 to a maximum of 7.4. U Aurigae, with a period of 408.1 days, ranges in magnitude from a minimum of 13.5 to a maximum of 7.5. X Aurigae, with a particularly short period of 163.8 days, ranges in magnitude from a minimum of 13.6 to a maximum of 8.0.

==== Binary and double stars ====
Auriga is home to several less prominent binary and double stars. Theta Aurigae (Bogardus, Mahasim) is a blue-white A0p class binary star of magnitude 2.62 with a luminosity of 75 L_{☉}. It has an absolute magnitude of 0.1 and is 165 light-years from Earth. The secondary is a yellow star of magnitude 7.1, which requires a telescope of 100 millimetres (3.9 in) in aperture to resolve; the two stars are separated by 3.6 arcseconds. It is the eastern vertex of the constellation's pentagon. Theta Aurigae is moving away from Earth at a rate of 17.5 miles (28.2 km) per second. Theta Aurigae additionally has a second optical companion, discovered by Otto Wilhelm von Struve in 1852. The separation was at 52 arcseconds in 1978 and has been increasing since then because of the proper motion of Theta Aurigae, 0.1 arcseconds per year. The separation of this magnitude 9.2 component was 2.2 arcminutes (130.7 arcseconds) in 2007 with an angle of 350°. 4 Aurigae is a double star at a distance of 159 light-years. The primary is of magnitude 5.0 and the secondary is of magnitude 8.1. 14 Aurigae is a white optical binary star. The primary is of magnitude 5.0 and is at a distance of 270 light-years; the secondary is of magnitude 7.9 and is at a distance of 82 light-years. HD 30453 is spectroscopic binary of magnitude 5.9, with a spectral type assessed as either A8m or F0m, and a period of seven days.

==== Stars with planetary systems ====
There are several stars with confirmed planetary systems in Auriga; there is also a white dwarf with a suspected planetary system. HD 40979 has one planet, HD 40979 b. It was discovered in 2002 through radial velocity measurements on the parent star. HD 40979 is 33.3 parsecs from Earth, a spectral class F8V star of magnitude 6.74—just past the limit of visibility to the naked eye. It is of similar size to the Sun, at 1.1 solar masses and 1.21 solar radii. The planet, with a mass of 3.83 Jupiter masses, orbits with a semi-major axis of 0.83 AU and a period of 263.1 days. HD 45350 has one planet as well. HD 45350 b was discovered through radial velocity measurements in 2004. It has a mass of 1.79 Jupiter masses and orbits every 890.76 days at a distance of 1.92 AU. Its parent star is faint, at an apparent magnitude of 7.88, a G5IV type star 49 parsecs away. It has a mass of 1.02 solar masses and a radius of 1.27 solar radii. HD 43691 b is a significantly larger planet, with a mass of 2.49 Jupiter masses; it is also far closer to its parent star, HD 43691. Discovered in 2007 from radial velocity measurements, it orbits at a distance of 0.24 AU with a period of 36.96 days. HD 43691 has a radius identical to the Sun's, though it is more dense; its mass is 1.38 solar masses. It is a G0IV type star of magnitude 8.03, 93.2 parsecs from Earth.

HD 49674 is a star in Auriga with one planet orbiting it. This G3V type star is faint, at magnitude 8.1, and fairly distant, at 40.7 parsecs from Earth. Like the other stars, it is similar in size to the Sun, with a mass of 1.07 solar masses and a radius of 0.94 solar radii. Its planet, HD 49674 b, is a smaller planet, at 0.115 Jupiter masses. It orbits very close to its star, at 0.058 AU, every 4.94 days. HD 49674 b was discovered by radial velocity observations in 2002. HAT-P-9 b is the first transiting exoplanet confirmed in Auriga, orbiting the star HAT-P-9. Unlike the other exoplanets in Auriga, detected by radial velocity measurements, HAT-P-9 b was detected using the transit method in 2008. It has a mass of 0.67 Jupiter masses and orbits just 0.053 AU from its parent star, with a period of 3.92 days; its radius is 1.4 Jupiter radii, making it a hot Jupiter. Its parent star, HAT-P-9, is an F-type star approximately 480 parsecs from Earth. It has a mass of 1.28 solar masses and a radius of 1.32 solar radii.

The star KELT-2A (HD 42176A) is the brightest star in Auriga known to host a transiting exoplanet, KELT-2Ab, and is the fifth-brightest transit hosting star overall. The brightness of the star KELT-2A allows the mass and radius of the planet KELT-2Ab to be known quite precisely. KELT-2Ab is 1.524 Jupiter masses and 1.290 Jupiter radii and on a 4.11-day-long orbit, making it another hot Jupiter, similar to HAT-P-9b. The star KELT-2A is a late F-dwarf and is one member of the common-proper-motion binary star system KELT-2. KELT-2B is an early K-dwarf about 295 AU away, and was discovered the same time as the exoplanet.

=== Deep-sky objects ===
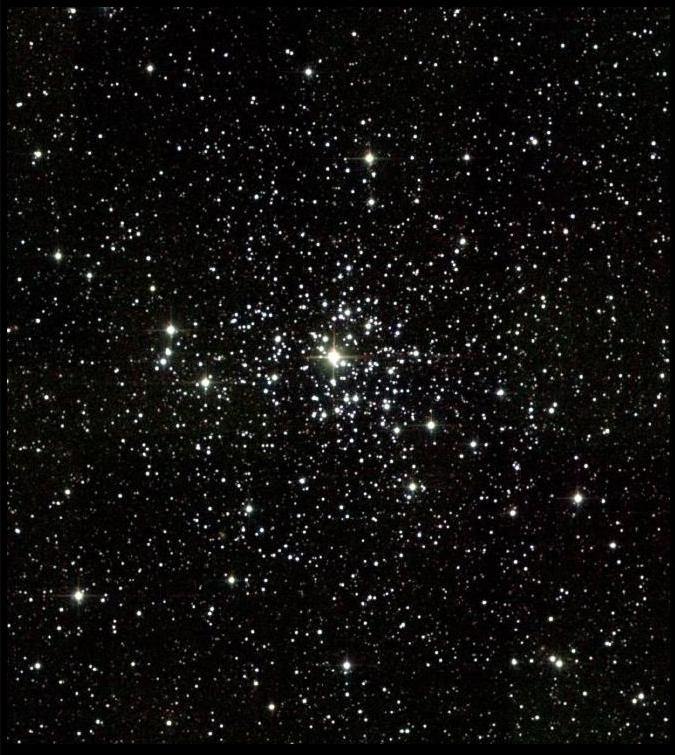
A photograph of M37

Auriga has the galactic anticenter, about 3.5° to the east of Beta Aurigae. This is the point on the celestial sphere opposite the Galactic Center; it is the edge of the galactic plane roughly nearest to the Solar System. Ignoring nearby bright stars in the foreground this is a smaller and less luminous part of the Milky Way than looking towards the rest of its arms or central bar and has dust bands of the outer spiral arms. Auriga has many open clusters and other objects; rich star-forming arms of the Milky Way—including the Perseus Arm and the Orion–Cygnus Arm—run through it. The three brightest open clusters are M36, M37 and M38, all of which are visible in binoculars or a small telescope in suburban skies. A larger telescope resolves individual stars. Three other open clusters are NGC 2281, lying close to ψ^{7} Aurigae, NGC 1664, which is close to ε Aurigae, and IC 410 (surrounding NGC 1893), a cluster with nebulosity next to IC 405, the Flaming Star Nebula, found about midway between M38 and ι Aurigae. AE Aurigae, a runaway star, is a bright variable star currently within the Flaming Star Nebula.

M36 (NGC 1960) is a young galactic open cluster with approximately 60 stars, most of which are relatively bright; however, only about 40 stars are visible in most amateur instruments. It is at a distance of 3,900 light-years and has an overall magnitude of 6.0; it is 14 light-years wide. Its apparent diameter is 12.0 arcminutes. Of the three open clusters in Auriga, M36 is both the smallest and the most concentrated, though its brightest stars are approximately 9th magnitude. It was discovered in 1749 by Guillaume Le Gentil, the first of Auriga's major open clusters to be discovered. M36 features a 10-arcminute-wide knot of bright stars in its center, anchored by Struve 737, a double star with components separated by 10.7 arcseconds. Most of the stars in M36 are B type stars with rapid rates of rotation. M36's Trumpler class is given as both I 3 r and II 3 m. Besides the central knot, most of the cluster's other stars appear in smaller knots and groups.

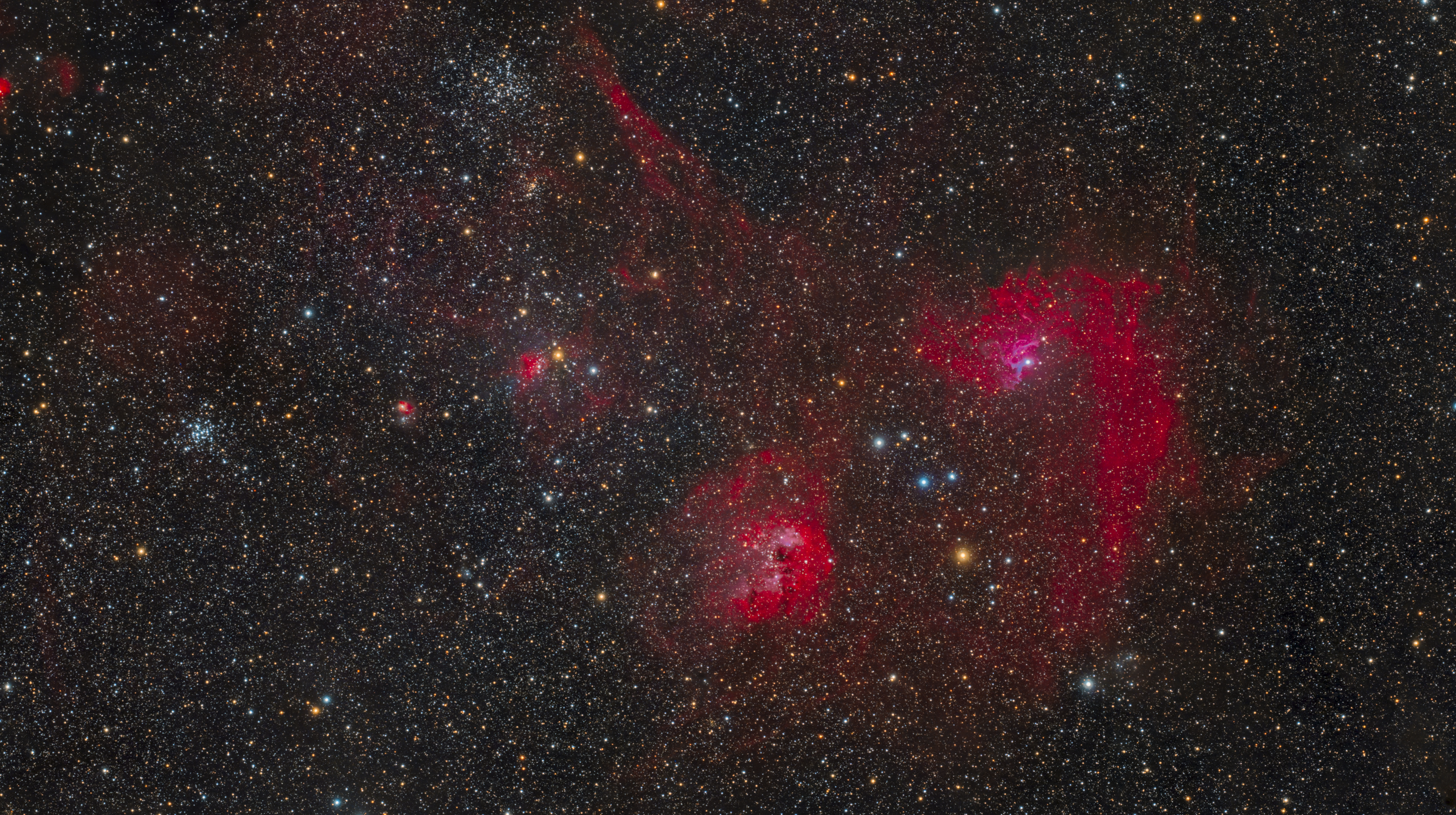
Open clusters Messier 37 and Messier 38 and the Caldwell 31 nebula

M37 (NGC 2099) is an open cluster, larger than M36 and at a distance of 4,200 light-years. It has 150 stars, making it the richest cluster in Auriga; the most prominent member is an orange star that appears at the center. M37 is approximately 25 light-years in diameter. It is the brightest open cluster in Auriga with a magnitude of 5.6; it has an apparent diameter of 23.0 arcminutes. M37 was discovered in 1764 by Charles Messier, the first of many astronomers to laud its beauty. It was described as "a virtual cloud of glittering stars" by Robert Burnham Jr. and Charles Piazzi Smyth commented that the star field was "strewed [sic]...with sparkling gold-dust". The stars of M37 are older than those of M36; they are approximately 200 million years old. Most of the constituent stars are A type stars, though there are at least 12 red giants in the cluster as well. M37's Trumpler class is given as both I 2 r and II 1 r. The stars visible in a telescope range in magnitude from 9.0 to 13.0; there are two 9th magnitude stars in the center of the cluster and an east to west chain of 10th and 11th magnitude stars.

M38 is a diffuse open cluster at a distance of 3,900 light-years, the least concentrated of the three main open clusters in Auriga; it is classified as a Trumpler Class II 2 r or III 2 r cluster because of this. It appears as a cross-shaped or pi-shaped object in a telescope and contains approximately 100 stars; its overall magnitude is 6.4. M38, like M36, was discovered by Guillaume Le Gentil in 1749. It has an apparent diameter of approximately 20 arcseconds and a true diameter of about 25 light-years. Unlike M36 or M37, M38 has a varied stellar population. The majority of the population consists of A and B type main sequence stars, the B type stars being the oldest members, and a number of G type giant stars. One yellow-hued G type star is the brightest star in M38 at a magnitude of 7.9. The brightest stars in M38 are magnitude 9 and 10. M38 is accompanied by NGC 1907, a smaller and dimmer cluster that lies half a degree south-southwest of M38; it is at a distance of 4,200 light-years. The smaller cluster has an overall magnitude of 8.2 and a diameter of 6.0 arcminutes, making it about a third the size of M38. However, NGC 1907 is a rich cluster, classified as a Trumpler Class I 1 m n cluster. It has approximately 12 stars of magnitude 9–10, and at least 25 stars of magnitude 9–12.

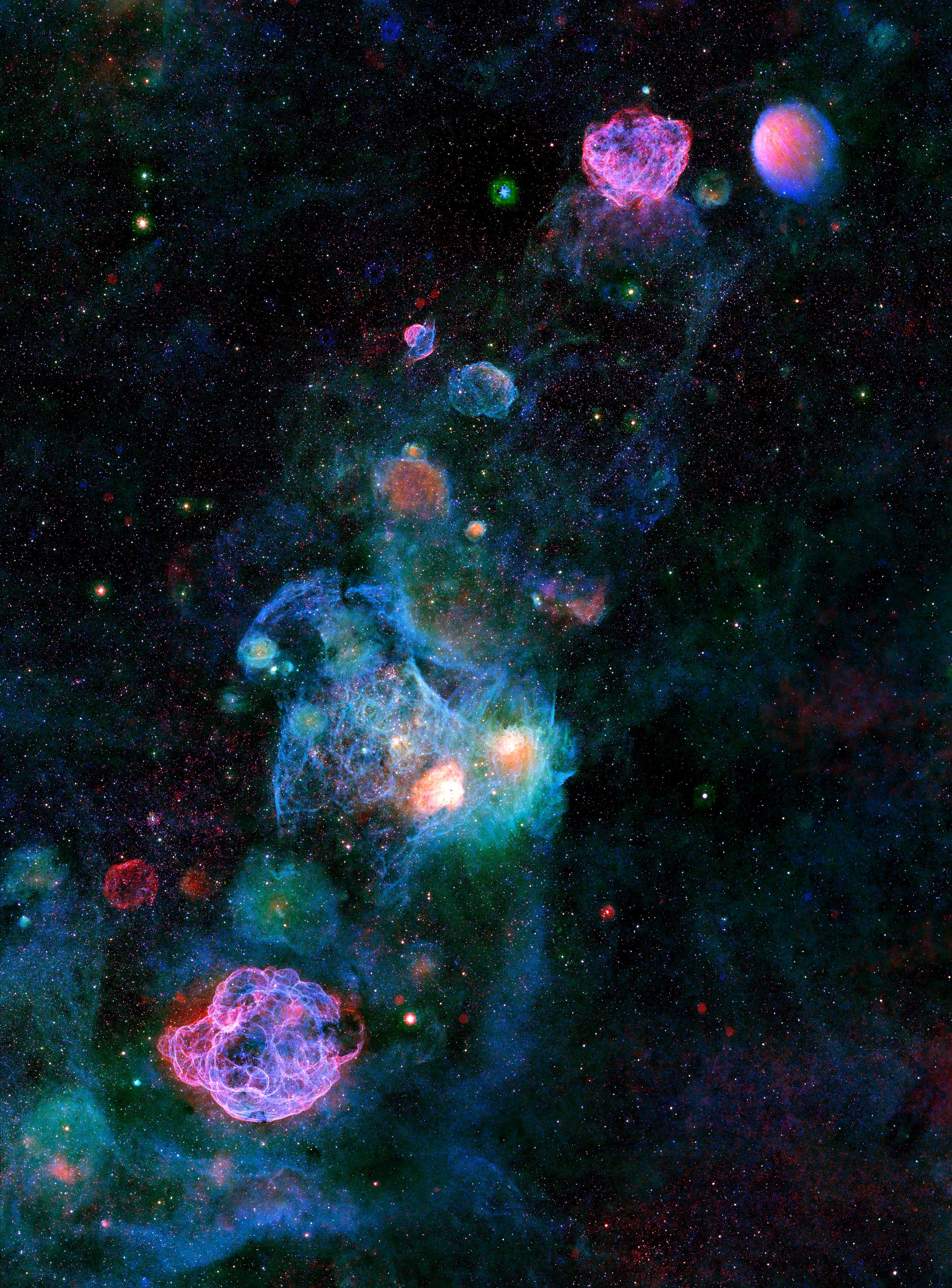
Emission nebulae in Auriga seen by the Northern Sky Narrowband Survey (annotated on full size image)

IC 410, a faint nebula, is accompanied by the bright open cluster NGC 1893. The cluster is thin, with a diameter of 12 arcminutes and a population of approximately 20 stars. Its accompanying nebula has very low surface brightness, partially because of its diameter of 40 arcminutes. It appears in an amateur telescope with brighter areas in the north and south; the brighter southern patch shows a pattern of darker and lighter spots in a large instrument. NGC 1893, of magnitude 7.5, is classified as a Trumpler Class II 3 r n or II 2 m n cluster, meaning that it is not very large and is somewhat bright. The cluster possesses approximately 30 stars of magnitude 9–12. In an amateur instrument, IC 410 is only visible with an Oxygen-III filter. NGC 2281 is a small open cluster at a distance of 1,500 light-years. It contains 30 stars in a crescent shape. It has an overall magnitude of 5.4 and a fairly large diameter of 14.0 arcseconds, classified as a Trumpler Class I 3 m cluster. The brightest star in the cluster is magnitude 8; there are approximately 12 stars of magnitude 9–10 and 20 stars of magnitude 11–13.

NGC 1931 is a nebula in Auriga, slightly more than one degree to the west of M36. It is considered to be a difficult target for an amateur telescope. NGC 1931 has an approximate integrated magnitude of 10.1; it is 3 by 3 arcminutes. However, it appears to be elongated in an amateur telescope. Some observers may note a green hue in the nebula; a large telescope will easily show the nebula's "peanut" shape, as well as the quartet of stars that are engulfed by the nebula. The open cluster portion of NGC 1931 is classed as a I 3 p n cluster; the nebula portion is classed as both an emission and reflection nebula. NGC 1931 is approximately 6,000 light-years from Earth and could easily be confused with a comet in the eyepiece of a telescope.

NGC 1664 is a fairly large open cluster, with a diameter of 18 arcminutes, and moderately bright, with a magnitude of 7.6, comparable to several other open clusters in Auriga. One open cluster with a similar magnitude is NGC 1778, with a magnitude of 7.7. This small cluster has a diameter of 7 arcminutes and contains 25 stars. NGC 1857, a small cluster, is slightly brighter at magnitude 7.0. It has a diameter of 6 arcminutes and contains 40 stars, making it far more concentrated than the similar-sized NGC 1778. Far dimmer than the other open clusters is NGC 2126 at magnitude 10.2. Despite its dimness, NGC 2126 is as concentrated as NGC 1857, having 40 stars in a diameter of 6 arcminutes.

=== Meteor showers ===
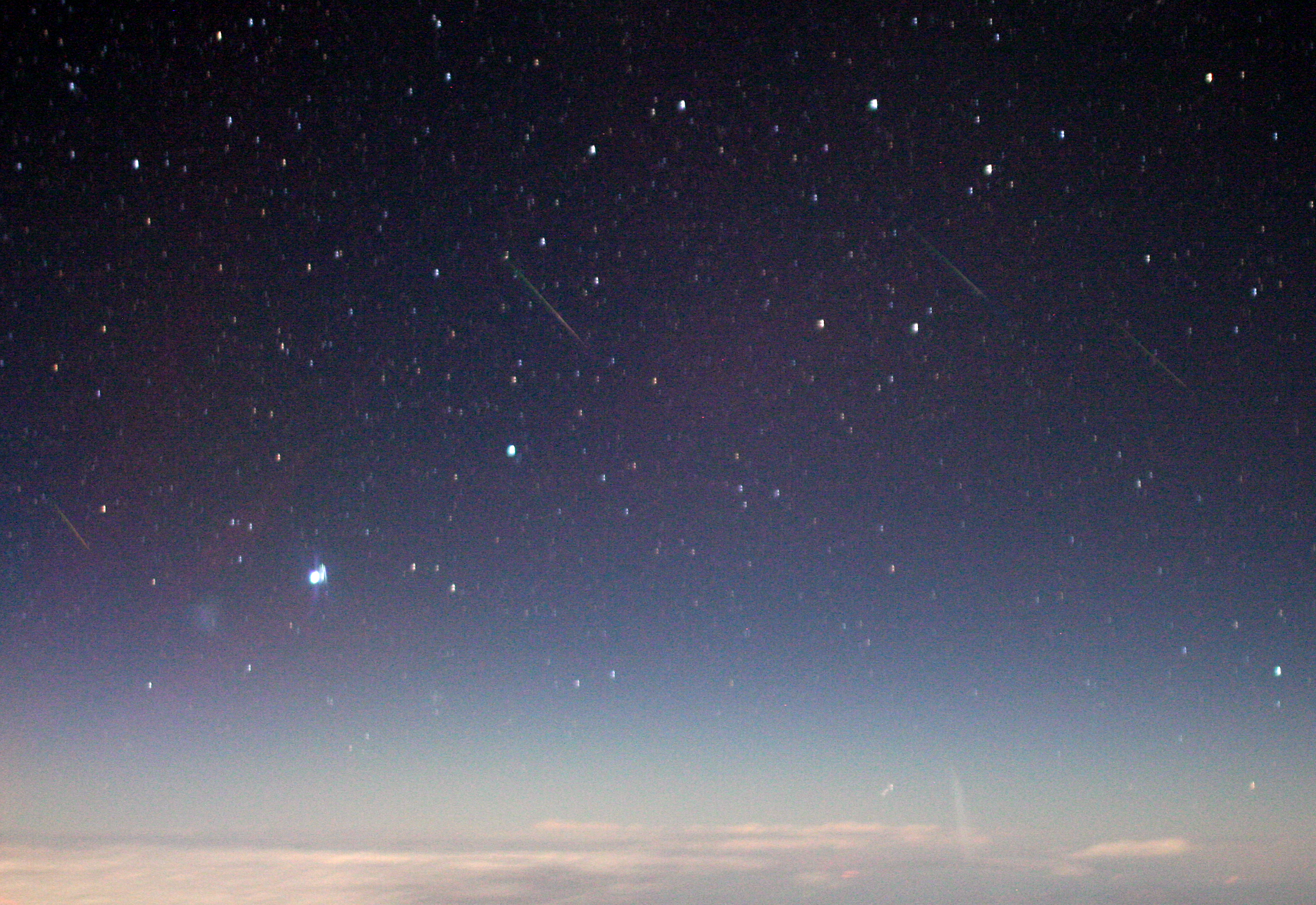
The 2007 Aurigid outburst observed from 47,000 feet by a NASA mission.

Auriga is home to two meteor showers. The Aurigids, named for the entire constellation and formerly called the "Alpha Aurigids", are renowned for their intermittent outbursts, such as those in 1935, 1986, 1994, and 2007. They are associated with the comet Kiess (C/1911 N1), discovered in 1911 by Carl Clarence Kiess. The association was discovered after the outburst in 1935 by Cuno Hoffmeister and Arthur Teichgraeber. The Aurigid outburst on September 1, 1935, prompted the investigation of a connection with Comet Kiess, though the 24-year delay between the comet's return caused doubt in the scientific community. However, the outburst in 1986 erased much of this doubt. Istvan Teplickzky, a Hungarian amateur meteor observer, observed many bright meteors radiating from Auriga in a fashion very similar to the confirmed 1935 outburst. Because the position of Teplickzky's observed radiant and the 1935 radiant were close to the position of Comet Kiess, the comet was confirmed as the source of the Aurigid meteor stream.

The Aurigids had a spectacular outburst in 1994, when many grazing meteors—those that have a shallow angle of entry and seem to rise from the horizon—were observed in California. The meteors were tinted blue and green, moved slowly, and left trails at least 45° long. Because they had such a shallow angle of entry, some 1994 Aurigids lasted up to 2 seconds. Though there were only a few visual observers for part of the outburst, the 1994 Aurigids peak, which lasted less than two hours, was later confirmed by Finnish amateur radio astronomer Ilkka Yrjölä. The connection with Comet Kiess was finally confirmed in 1994. The 2007 outburst of the Aurigids was predicted by Peter Jenniskens and was observed by astronomers worldwide. Despite some predictions that there would be no Alpha Aurigid outburst, many bright meteors were observed throughout the shower, which peaked on September 1 as predicted. Much like in the 1994 outburst, the 2007 Aurigids were very bright and often colored blue and green. The maximum zenithal hourly rate was 100 meteors per hour, observed at 4:15 am, California time (12:15 UTC) by a team of astronomers flying on NASA planes.

The Aurigids are normally a placid Class II meteor shower that peaks in the early morning hours of September 1, beginning on August 28 every year. Though the maximum zenithal hourly rate is 2–5 meteors per hour, the Aurigids are fast, with an entry velocity of 67 kilometres per second (42 mi/s). The annual Aurigids have a radiant located about two degrees north of Theta Aurigae, a third-magnitude star in the center of the constellation. The Aurigids end on September 4. Some years, the maximum rate has reached 9–30 meteors per hour.

The other meteor showers radiating from Auriga are far less prominent and capricious than the Alpha Aurigids. The Zeta Aurigids are a weak shower with a northern and southern branch lasting from December 11 to January 21. The shower peaks on January 1 and has very slow meteors, with a maximum rate of 1–5 meteors per hour. It was discovered by William Denning in 1886 and was discovered to be the source of rare fireballs by Alexander Stewart Herschel. There is another faint stream of meteors called the "Aurigids", unrelated to the September shower. This shower lasts from January 31 to February 23, peaking from February 5 through February 10; its slow meteors peak at a rate of approximately 2 per hour. The Delta Aurigids are a faint shower radiating from Auriga. It was discovered by a group of researchers at New Mexico State University and has a very low peak rate. The Delta Aurigids last from September 22 through October 23, peaking between October 6 and October 15. They may be related to the September Epsilon Perseids, though they are more similar to the Coma Berenicids in that the Delta Aurigids last longer and have a dearth of bright meteors. They too have a hypothesized connection to an unknown short period retrograde comet. The Iota Aurigids are a hypothesized shower occurring in mid-November; its parent body may be the asteroid 2000 NL10, but this connection is highly disputed. The hypothesized Iota Aurigids may instead be a faint stream of Taurids.

== See also ==
- Psi Aurigae
