= Documentation of the Malagasy language =

Documentation of the Malagasy language traces the early records of the Malagasy language compiled by European explorers, traders, and missionaries from the 17th to the 19th century. The principal early sources form a chronological corpus ranging from the first Malagasy–Dutch word list compiled by Frederick de Houtman (1603) and the first Malagasy–French numerals recorded by François Martin de Vitré (also 1603) to the first English–Malagasy dictionary, published in 1835. These works record Malagasy as it was spoken in various coastal regions, encompassing vocabularies, numerals, dialogues, and—in later instances—dictionaries and prayers. The London Missionary Society (LMS) missionaries produced the final major contributions to this early documentary tradition; their 1835 English–Malagasy dictionary, based predominantly on the Merina dialect, marks the transition to modern standardized Malagasy.

== Early Dutch and French records (1603) ==
In 1603, Frederick de Houtman published in Amsterdam the Spraeck ende Woord-boeck inde Maleysche ende Madagaskarsche Talen, which contains a Dutch–Malagasy vocabulary and dialogues. De Houtman had learned Malagasy (Old Northern Betsimisaraka dialect) during his stay at Sainte-Marie and in Antongil Bay. The Malagasy vocabulary probably came from a Malagasy interpreter from these regions, who had spent four years with the Dutch and knew Dutch well. At the same time, in 1603, François Martin de Vitré noted a list of numbers in Southwestern Malagasy (Old Vezo or Old Masikoro) during his passage at Saint-Augustin Bay. Thus, Malay and Malagasy appear side by side in their works suggesting similarities.

=== Numbers in Old Malagasy (Southern and Northern, 1603) ===
Numbers in Old Malagasy (Southern and Northern in 1603)
| # | Gloss | Martin de Vitré (Saint-Augustin Bay, 1603) | Frederick de Houtman (Saint-Marie & Antongil Bay, 1603) | Standard Malagasy |
|---|---|---|---|---|
| 1 | one | Issa | Issa / Areick | Isa/Iray |
| 2 | two | Roue | Roo | roa |
| 3 | three | Tello | Tello | telo |
| 4 | four | Effad | Efferts | efatra |
| 5 | five | Lime | Dimi | dimy |
| 6 | six | Enning | Ennin | enina |
| 7 | seven | Fruto | Fitoe | fito |
| 8 | eight | Vvoulo | Wallou | valo |
| 9 | nine | Siday | Sivy | sivy |
| 10 | ten | Faule | Foelou | folo |
| 20 | twenty | | Roo poelo | roapolo |
| 21 | twenty-one | | Roo poelo areick | iraika ambin’ny roapolo |
| 22 | twenty-two | | Roo poelo roo | roa ambin’ny roapolo |
| 23 | twenty-three | | Roo poelo tello | telo ambin’ny roapolo |
| 24 | twenty-four | | Roo poelo efferts | efatra ambin’ny roapolo |
| 25 | twenty-five | | Roo poelo dimi | dimy ambin’ny roapolo |
| 26 | twenty-six | | Roo poelo ennin | enina ambin’ny roapolo |
| 27 | twenty-seven | | Roo poelo fitoe | fito ambin’ny roapolo |
| 28 | twenty-eight | | Roo poelo wallou | valo ambin’ny roapolo |
| 29 | twenty-nine | | Roo poelo sivy | sivy ambin’ny roapolo |
| 30 | thirty | | Tello poelo | telopolo |
| 40 | forty | | Effert poelo | efapolo |
| 50 | fifty | | Dimy poelo | dimampolo |
| 60 | sixty | | Ennin poelo | enimpolo |
| 70 | seventy | | Fitou poelo | fitopolo |
| 80 | eighty | | Wallou poelo | valopolo |
| 90 | ninety | | Sivy poelo | sivifolo |
| 100 | hundred | | Siatou | zato |
| 1000 | thousand | | Heetsi | arivo |

=== Collected lexical items by Houtman (Old Northern Malagasy) ===
Collected Lexical Items by Houtman (Old Northern Malagasy)
| # | Gloss | Old Northern Malagasy (Saint-Marie & Antongil Bay, 17th c.) | Standard Malagasy |
|---|---|---|---|
| 1 | You | Hannau | Anao |
| 2 | Ship | Laccan | Lakana |
| 3 | Here (past) | Tetoeu | Teto |
| 4 | To buy | Mevydy | Mividy |
| 5 | What | Innou | Inona |
| 6 | Water | Rano | Rano |
| 7 | Rice | Varre | Vary |
| 8 | Cow | Agombe | Omby |
| 9 | Honey | Tintelly | Tantely |
| 10 | We | Iahye | Izahay |
| 11 | Where are you from? | Lehataja nou? | Avy aiza anao? |
| 12 | Person | Ouloun | Olona |
| 13 | Far away | Labebey | Lavitra be |
| 14 | What's the name of the country? | Innou angarre tany? | Inona ny anaran'ny tany? |
| 15 | Our country is called Holland | Tany ney magebey Hollant | Holandy no anaran'ny taninay |
| 16 | Copper | Brahing | Varahina |
| 17 | Silver | Pellan | Volafotsy |
| 18 | Knife | Kissou | Antsy |
| 19 | Thief | Ampangalats | Mpangalatra |
| 20 | Merchant | Ampevarots | Mpivarotra |
| 21 | Leave that there | Avyla uw kony | Avelao eo |
| 22 | Night | Alin | Alina |
| 23 | Tomorrow | Hamerein | Rahampitso |
| 24 | God | Iang hary | Zanahary |
| 25 | All | Aby | Rehetra |
| 26 | Us | Atsiken | Isika |
| 27 | White/European | Vajaha | Vazaha |
| 28 | Goat | Osse | Osy |
| 29 | Milk | Rononne | Ronono |
| 30 | How much the oxen? | Firy n'ya agombe? | Ohatrinona ny omby? |
| 31 | Little | Hele | Kely |
| 32 | Cheap | Mora | Mora |
| 33 | Your boat | Ny-laccan hannau | Ny lakanao |
| 34 | Horn | Tandock | Tandroka |
| 35 | Why | Nahoen | Nahoana |
| 36 | To say/tell | Mevoullang | Miteny |
| 37 | Ear | Souffing | Sofina |
| 38 | Nose | Oroen | Orona |
| 39 | Dead | Naty | Maty |
| 40 | High/On top | Angambo | Ambony |
| 41 | Sick | Marare | Marary |
| 42 | Long | Lava | Lava |
| 43 | Short | Fohy | Fohy |
| 44 | Bad | Rratsy | Ratsy |
| 45 | Crazy | Lefack | Marary saina |
| 46 | White | Foetsy | Fotsy |
| 47 | When | Oviene | Oviana |
| 48 | Lemurian | Warck | Varika |
| 49 | Axe | Feck | Famaky |
| 50 | Penis | Latack | Lataka |
| 51 | Blood | Ra | Rà |
| 52 | Breast | Nounou | Nono |
| 53 | Powder | Vanja | Vanja |
| 54 | Dark | Mey sing | Maizina |
| 55 | Angry | Vingirt | Tezitra |
| 56 | To dream | Mang'noffy | Manonofy |
| 57 | King | Ampenjacke | Mpanjaka |
| 58 | Tired | Ballack | Vizana |
| 59 | Good | Tsara | Tsara |
| 60 | Egg | Atoulou / Atoelou | Atody |
| 61 | Island | Nossey | Nosy |
| 62 | Rain | Orang | Orana |
| 63 | Huge | Iackebey | Lehibe |
| 64 | Happy | Ravo | Faly |
| 65 | Neck | Wojong | Tenda |
| 66 | Hand | Tang'an | Tanana |
| 67 | Hair | Wullo | Volo |
| 68 | Bow/Crossbow | Faly | - |
| 69 | South | Antemoo | Atsimo |
| 70 | Chicken | Akoho | Akoho |
| 71 | Shark | Ansansa | Antsantsa |
| 72 | House | Tsangou | Trano |
| 73 | Skin | Hoedits | Hoditra |
| 74 | Yes | Iee | Eny / Ye |
| 75 | Steel | Wy | Vy |
| 76 | Wife | Vady | Vady |
| 77 | Child | Iaja | Zaza |
| 78 | Cheek | Feef | Fify |
| 79 | Year | Tawon | Taona |
| 80 | Spear | Liffong | Lefona |
| 81 | Light | Maivang | Maivana |
| 82 | Sky | Langits | Lanitra |
| 83 | Virgin | Mitouvoo | - |
| 84 | Moon | Voelan | Volana |
| 85 | Man | Lelahy | Lehilahy |
| 86 | Skinny | Mah'ia | Mahia |
| 87 | Mother | Renni | Reny |
| 88 | To watch/look at | Mijaha | Mijery |
| 89 | Nail | Vajangkoho | Hoho |
| 90 | To sell | Mandof | Mivarotra |
| 91 | Saved | Awotto | Avotra |
| 92 | To climb | Makats | Miakatra |
| 93 | Prince | Annack adien | Anakandriana |
| 94 | Pot | Balangi | Vilany |
| 95 | To learn | Mienjatsi | Mianatra |
| 96 | Spider | Fararets | - |
| 97 | Dry | Maeying | Maina |
| 98 | Red | Meynja | Mena |
| 99 | Rat | Vella vou | Voalavo |
| 100 | Fat | Mattavi | Matavy |
| 101 | Sweet | Mamy | Mamy |
| 102 | To count | Mangisa | Manisa |
| 103 | Sun | Masso anro | Masoandro |
| 104 | Afraid | Matahots | Matahotra |
| 105 | Mortar | Leong | Leona |
| 106 | Tooth | Niffy | Nify |
| 107 | Yesterday | Maddy | Omaly |
| 108 | Letter | Soerat | Soratra |
| 109 | To close | Afoedy | Ahidy |
| 110 | To wait | Mandingy | Miandry |
| 111 | Father | Ray | Ray |

== Richard Boothby's records from Saint Augustine Bay (1646) ==
Richard Boothby, in his 1646 work A Brief Discovery or Description of the Most Famous Island of Madagascar, or St. Laurence, recorded several words from the inhabitants of Saint Augustine's Bay (in present-day Toliara). The language spoken in that region is now classified as part of the Vezo dialect, which belongs to the Southern Malagasic dialect cluster—likely representing an early form of Proto-Vezo.

Comparative Vocabulary of St Augustine Bay Language (Boothby, 1646) and Standard Malagasy
| # | Gloss | St Augustine Bay (Boothby, 17th c.) | Standard Malagasy |
|---|---|---|---|
| 1 | good | Chara | tsara |
| 2 | rope | Talle | tady |
| 3 | cloth | Lomba | lamba |
| 4 | lance | Leffo | lefona |
| 5 | tomorrow | Humeray | ampitso |
| 6 | salt | Syra | sira |
| 7 | palm of hand | Fala tanga | felatanana |
| 8 | tongue | Leela | lela |
| 9 | ear | Saffe | sofina |
| 10 | eye | Maca | maso |
| 11 | hair | Voyla | volo |
| 12 | shoulder | Sowkee | soroka |
| 13 | back (body) | Lemboshe | lamosina |
| 14 | butt | Voylee | vody |
| 15 | breast | Noeno | nono |
| 16 | hand | Tanga | tanana |
| 17 | teeth | Niffa | nify |
| 18 | chin | Soca | saoka |
| 19 | cow | Angomba | omby |

== François Cauche's southern Malagasy vocabulary (1651) ==
François Cauche travelled mostly in southern Madagascar in the regions inhabited by the Antanosy, Mahafaly, and Antandroy (Ampatres), but also briefly along the eastern coast among the Antaimoro (Matatane) and around Antongil Bay (Northern Betsimisaraka). He collected mostly vocabulary from the south, where he carried out the majority of his commercial exchanges. He is the first to record conversations in Malagasy, probably from southern and eastern Malagasy varieties, necessary for communication and trade. His observations and vocabulary were later published in Relations véritables et curieuses de l'isle de Madagascar par François Cauche, et du Brésil in 1651.

=== Numbers in Old Southern Malagasy (Cauche, 1651) ===
Numbers in Old Southern Malagasy (Cauche, 1651)
| # | Gloss | Old Southern Malagasy (Cauche, 17th c.) | Standard Malagasy |
|---|---|---|---|
| 1 | one | Is | iray |
| 2 | two | ro | roa |
| 3 | three | tel | telo |
| 4 | four | ef | efatra |
| 5 | five | lime | dimy |
| 6 | six | enne | enina |
| 7 | seven | fuite | fito |
| 8 | eight | vale | valo |
| 9 | nine | cive | sivy |
| 10 | ten | foule | folo |
| 11 | eleven | Iray manifoule | iraika ambin’ny folo |
| 12 | twelve | ro manifoule | roa ambin’ny folo |
| 13 | thirteen | tel manifoule | telo ambin’ny folo |
| 14 | fourteen | ef manifoule | efatra ambin’ny folo |
| 15 | fifteen | lime manifoule | dimy ambin’ny folo |
| 16 | sixteen | enne manifoule | enina ambin’ny folo |
| 17 | seventeen | fuite manifoule | fito ambin’ny folo |
| 18 | eighteen | vale manifoule | valo ambin’ny folo |
| 19 | nineteen | cive manifoule | sivy ambin’ny folo |
| 20 | twenty | ropoule | roapolo |
| 21 | twenty-one | ropoule irai cambiombe | Iraika ambin'ny roapolo |
| 22 | twenty-two | ropoule ro cambiombe | roa ambin'ny roapolo |
| 23 | twenty-three | ropoule tel cambiombe | telo ambin'ny roapolo |
| 30 | thirty | tel poule | telopolo |
| 40 | forty | ef poule | efapolo |
| 50 | fifty | lia poule or lime poule | dimampolo |
| 60 | sixty | enne poule | enimpolo |
| 70 | seventy | fuite poule | fitopolo |
| 80 | eighty | vale poule | valopolo |
| 90 | ninety | cive poule | sivifolo |
| 100 | one hundred | zat | zato |
| 200 | two hundred | rozat | roanjato |
| 300 | three hundred | telzat | telonjato |
| 400 | four hundred | efsat | efajato |
| 500 | five hundred | lime zat | dimanjato |
| 600 | six hundred | ennezat | eninjato |
| 700 | seven hundred | fuite zat | fitonjato |
| 800 | eight hundred | vale zat | valonjato |
| 900 | nine hundred | cive zat | sivinjato |
| 1000 | one thousand | arrive or irecarive | arivo |
| 2000 | two thousand | roarive | roa arivo |

=== Collected lexical items by Cauche (Old Southern Malagasy) ===
Collected Lexical Items by Cauche (Old Southern Malagasy)
| # | Gloss | Old Southern Malagasy (Cauche, 17th c.) | Standard Malagasy |
|---|---|---|---|
| 1 | Canoe | Lacque | Lakana |
| 2 | Oil | Menach | Menaka |
| 3 | Red | Mene | Mena |
| 4 | Chicken | Acoo/acoho | Akoho |
| 5 | Fish | Fuie | Trondro |
| 6 | Rope | Tali | Tady |
| 7 | We | Zahai | Izahay |
| 8 | You (sing.) | Anno | Ianao |
| 9 | Cat | Pise | Saka |
| 10 | Dog | Ambo | Alika |
| 11 | Crazy | Maulle | Adala |
| 12 | Butter | Menacronon | Dibera |
| 13 | Anymore | Sasse | Intsony |
| 14 | Thin | Mahie | Mahia |
| 15 | Fat | Manesse | Matavy |
| 16 | Smelly | Mahibou | Maimbo |
| 17 | Afraid | Mattao | Matahotra |
| 18 | Person | Oule | Olona |
| 19 | Sun | Massuandre | Masoandro |
| 20 | Evening | Massuandre matte | Hariva |
| 21 | Hungry | Rez | Noana |
| 22 | Hot | Maye | Mafana |
| 23 | Cold | Manarre | Mangatsiaka |
| 24 | Little | Massessaie | Kely |
| 25 | Big | Croute baye | Lehibe |
| 26 | Good / Beautiful | So | Tsara |
| 27 | To cry | Toumangre | Mitomany |
| 28 | To sleep | Mandre | Matory |
| 29 | To drink | Minon | Misotro |
| 30 | To eat | Hyne | Mihinana |
| 31 | Steel | Vie | Vy |
| 32 | Bread | Moufe | Mofo |
| 33 | Silver | Voulafouche | Volafotsy |
| 34 | Gold | Voulameno | Volamena |
| 35 | Stone | Vate | Vato |
| 36 | Wind | Harre | Rivotra |
| 37 | Up / Above | Ambonne | Ambony |
| 38 | Tree | Aze | Hazo |
| 39 | Rum | Cique af | Toaka |
| 40 | Wine | Ciq | Divay |
| 41 | Sky | Arro | Lanitra |
| 42 | Earth | Tanne | Tany |
| 43 | Water | Ranne | Rano |
| 44 | Cold water | Ranne mangasi | Rano mangatsiaka |
| 45 | Fire | Affe | Afo |
| 46 | Spirit | Zin | Fanahy |
| 47 | Heart | Foo | Fo |
| 48 | Foot | Tambou | Tongotra |
| 49 | Tits | Nonne | Nono |
| 50 | Liver | Atte | Aty |
| 51 | Belly | Trou | Kibo |
| 52 | Hands | Tangue | Tanana |
| 53 | Butt/Ass | Fourin | VodY |
| 54 | Neck | Vouze | Tenda |
| 55 | Tooth | Nife | Nify |
| 56 | Tongue | Lelle | Lela |
| 57 | Mouth | Vave | Vava |
| 58 | Nose | Orre | Orona |
| 59 | Eye | Masse | Maso |
| 60 | Ear | Soufe | Sofina |
| 61 | Hair | Voule | Volo |
| 62 | Head | Loha | Loha |
| 63 | I / Me | Zaa | Izaho |
| 64 | He/She/It | Ize | Izy |
| 65 | Him/She/It | Ize | Izy |
| 66 | Meat | Hen | Hena |
| 67 | Too / Also | Coo | Koa |
| 68 | Dead | Matte | Maty |
| 69 | Tomorrow | Amaray | Ampitso |
| 70 | Morning | Empice | Maraina |
| 71 | Egg | Attoule | Atody |

== Étienne de Flacourt's Malagasy–French vocabulary (1658) ==
A small Malagasy–French vocabulary compiled by Étienne de Flacourt, former Governor of the French settlement at Fort-Dauphin (Tolagnaro), was published in Paris in 1658. It is the first printed work to include prayers in Malagasy. Flacourt likely contributed to the dictionary and a catechism prepared by the Lazarist Fathers, whom he later presented to the future Saint Vincent de Paul.

=== Comparative vocabulary and numerals (Flacourt, 1658) ===
Comparative Vocabulary of 17th Century Southern Malagasy (Flacourt) and Standard Malagasy
| # | Gloss (English) | Old Southern Malagasy (Anosy, Mid-17th c.) | Standard Malagasy | Arabic / Swahili |
|---|---|---|---|---|
| 1 | Wine | Siche | Divay | Khamr (خمر) |
| 2 | Face | Lahatse / Tarehy | Tarehy | - |
| 3 | Theft | Fangalatse / Halatra | Halatra | - |
| 4 | To live | Mienghe | Miaina | - |
| 5 | Alive | Vellom | Velona | - |
| 6 | City / Village | Tanaha | Tanana | - |
| 7 | Old | Antetse | Antitra | - |
| 8 | Victory | Fanressehan | Fandresena | - |
| 9 | Clothes | Tsichine | Akanjo | - |
| 10 | Green | Mahitsou | Maintso | - |
| 11 | Stick | Anghira | Tsorakazo | - |
| 12 | Belly | Troc | Kibo | - |
| 13 | To sell | Mivarots | Mivarotra | - |
| 14 | Seller | Ompivarots | Mpivarotra | - |
| 15 | Wave | Mouza | Onjana | mawja (موجة) |
| 16 | To kill | Mamounou | Mamono | - |
| 17 | To find | Mahita | Mahita | - |
| 18 | A lot | Lohatse | Loatra | - |
| 19 | Earthquake | Hourouhourounitane | Horohoron-tany | - |
| 20 | Work | Hassa | Asa | - |
| 21 | To cut | Manapa | Manapaka | - |
| 22 | Betrayal | Fitacq | Fitaka | - |
| 23 | All | Abi | Avi | - |
| 24 | Early | Sahali | Sahady | - |
| 25 | Thunder | Varats | Varatra | - |
| 26 | Head | Loha | Loha | - |
| 27 | Tamarind | Montémonte | Voamadilo | - |
| 28 | On | Ambone | Ambony | - |
| 29 | South | Acimou | Atsimo | - |
| 30 | Sugarcane | Fare | Fary | - |
| 31 | Frequently | Matetech | Matetika | - |
| 32 | Suffering | Fiharets | Fijaliana | - |
| 33 | Witch / Sorcerer | Ompamousavé | Mpamosavy | - |
| 34 | To dream | Mahinouf | Manonofy | - |
| 35 | Solitude / Loneliness | Fitocan | Fitoka-monina | - |
| 36 | Sun | Massouandrou | Masoandro | - |
| 37 | Thirsty | Hettehette | Hetaheta | - |
| 38 | Only | Avau | Ihany | - |
| 39 | Alone | Irere / Iraiky | Irery | - |
| 40 | Salt | Sira | Sira | - |
| 41 | Dry | Mahé | Maina | - |
| 42 | Scorpion | Hala | Hala | - |
| 43 | To jump | Mamoca | Mambikina | - |
| 44 | To bleed | Mandevorha | Mandeha ra | - |
| 45 | Sand | Fasso | Fasika | - |
| 46 | Rice | Vare | Vary | - |
| 47 | Laughter | Hehé | Hehy | - |
| 48 | To return | Mipoulé | Miverina | - |
| 49 | Shark | Antsantsa | Antsantsa | - |
| 50 | To meet | Mifahita | Mihaona | - |
| 51 | To refuse | Mandaha | Mandà | - |
| 52 | Root | Foton / Vahan | Faka | - |
| 53 | What's this? | Hinne iou? | Inona io? | - |
| 54 | Who | Izo | Iza | - |
| 55 | Question | Fanghotaneia | Fanontaniana | - |
| 56 | Deep | Lalen | Lalina | - |
| 57 | To pray | Mkabiry | Mivavaka | Kabir (كبير) |
| 58 | To testify | Misahada | Mijoro vavolombelona | Yashhadu(شهد) |
| 59 | Wet | Lay | Lena | - |
| 60 | Dead | Mate | Maty | - |
| 61 | To bite | Manifats | Magnekitry | - |
| 62 | Sir | Roandria / Ranghandria | Andriamatoa | - |
| 63 | To threaten | Michinia | - | - |
| 64 | Bad | Ratsi | Ratsy | - |
| 65 | Medicine | Auli | Fanafody | - |
| 66 | To marry | Manambali | Manambady | - |
| 67 | Marie | Ramariama | Masina Maria | Maryam |
| 68 | Wedding | Fanambalian | Fanambadiana | - |
| 69 | Merchant | Ompivarotse | Mpivarotra | - |
| 70 | Misfortune | Vouhy | Voina | - |
| 71 | But | Fa | Fa | - |
| 72 | Bad | Ratsi | Ratsy | - |
| 73 | Hand | Tang | Tanana | - |
| 74 | Sick | Marre | Marary | - |
| 75 | Skiny | Mahiia | Mahiia | - |
| 76 | To settle | Monengh | Monina | - |
| 77 | Place | Touhere | Toerana | - |
| 78 | Lesson | Anatse | Anatra / Lesona | - |
| 79 | Tongue | Lela | Lela | - |
| 80 | Ugly | Ratsi | Ratsy | - |
| 81 | Milk | Ronono | Ronono | - |
| 82 | Language | Voulanh | Fiteny | - |
| 83 | Make | Tsianach | Farihy | - |
| 84 | There | Irocq | Io / Iroa (rare) | - |
| 85 | Day | Anrou | Andro | - |
| 86 | Happiness | Haravouan | Haravoana | - |
| 87 | Ever / Never | Tsiare / Insatse | Intsony | - |
| 88 | Jesus | Rahissa | Jesosy | Issa |
| 89 | Insult | Ompa | Ompa | - |
| 90 | Island | Nossi | Nosy | - |
| 91 | Here | Atoua | Ato | - |
| 92 | This | Itouy | Ito / Ity | - |
| 93 | Outside | Avella | Ivelany | - |
| 94 | Oil | Menach | Menaka | - |
| 95 | Owl | Vouroundoule | Vorondolo | - |
| 96 | Above / On | Ambone | Ambony | - |
| 97 | Axe | Feche | Famaky | - |
| 98 | Fat | Vonrac | Matavy | - |
| 99 | Gun | Ampigaratsebato | Basy | - |
| 100 | Fruit | Boa | Voankazo | - |
| 101 | River | Onghe | Renirano | Ayn (عين) |
| 102 | Fire | Afou | Afo | - |
| 103 | To flee | Milefa | Mitsoaka | - |
| 104 | Behind | Afara | Aoriana | - |
| 105 | To embark | Manhondra | Mitondrana | - |
| 106 | Equal | Mira | Mira | - |
| 107 | Image | Tsara | Sary | ṣūra(صورة) |
| 108 | Water | Ranou | Rano | - |
| 109 | Sweet | Mami | Mamy | - |
| 110 | To sleep | Mande | Mandry | - |
| 111 | In front of | Aloha | Aloha | - |
| 112 | Debt | Trousse | Trosa | - |
| 113 | Tooth | Nifi | Nify | - |
| 114 | Already | Lahame | Sahady | - |
| 115 | Tomorrow | Amarai | Rahampitso | - |
| 116 | Damned | Kafiry | Voaozona | - |
| 117 | To believe | Meinou | Mino | yu’minu (آمن) |
| 118 | Knife | Mes / Antsi | Antsy | - |
| 119 | Chest | Sandouc | Kesika | - |
| 120 | Key | Fanghalahilli | Fanalahidy | - |
| 121 | Sky | Langhits | Lanitra | - |
| 122 | Dog | Amboua | Alika | - |
| 123 | Horse | Farassa | Soavaly | - |
| 124 | Hot / Warm | Mahe | Mafana | - |
| 125 | Shirt | Camise | Lobaka | Qamis (قميص) |
| 126 | Cat | Pise | Saka | - |
| 127 | Camel | Angammerre | Rameva | Jammal (جمل) |
| 128 | Ring | Ampete | Peratra | Pete |
| 129 | Balance | Midza | Mizana | mīzān (ميزان) |
| 130 | With | Aman | Sy | - |
| 131 | Also | Coua | Koa | - |

Numerals in 17th Century Southern Malagasy (Flacourt) and Standard Malagasy
| # | Gloss | Old Southern Malagasy (Anosy, Mid-17th c.) | Standard Malagasy |
|---|---|---|---|
| 1 | One | Iraiche / Issa | Iray / Isa |
| 2 | Two | Roué / Rohi | Roa |
| 3 | Three | Tellou | Telo |
| 4 | Four | Efats | Efatra |
| 5 | Five | Limi | Dimy |
| 6 | Six | Enem | Enina |
| 7 | Seven | Fitou | Fito |
| 8 | Eight | Valou | Valo |
| 9 | Nine | Sivi | Sivy |
| 10 | Ten | Foulo | Folo |
| 11 | Eleven | Iranamanifoulo / Iracamanifoulo | Iraika ambin'ny folo |
| 12 | Twelve | Roé amanifoulo | Roa ambin'ny folo |
| 13 | Thirteen | Tellou amanifoulo | Telo ambin'ny folo |
| 14 | Fourteen | Effats amanifoulo | Efatra ambin'ny folo |
| 15 | Fifteen | Limi amanifoulo | Dimy ambin'ny folo |
| 16 | Sixteen | Enem amanifoulo | Enina ambin'ny folo |
| 17 | Seventeen | Fitou amani foulo | Fito ambin'ny folo |
| 18 | Eighteen | Valou amani foulo | Valo ambin'ny folo |
| 19 | Nineteen | Civi amani foulo | Sivy ambin'ny folo |
| 20 | Twenty | Ropoul | Roapolo |
| 25 | Twenty-five | Ropoul limi ambi | Dimy amby roapolo |
| 30 | Thirty | Tellopoul / Teloupoulou | Telopolo |
| 40 | Forty | Efatte poul / Effats poulo | Efapolo |
| 50 | Fifty | Liapoulo | Dimampolo |
| 60 | Sixty | Enempoul | Enimpolo |
| 70 | Seventy | Fitoupoul | Fito-polo |
| 80 | Eighty | Valoupoul | Valopolo |
| 90 | Ninety | Civifoulo | Sivifolo |
| 100 | One hundred | Zatou | Zato |
| 150 | One hundred fifty | Liapoul ambi Zatou | Dimampolo ambin'ny zato |
| 500 | Five hundred | Limizatou | Dimanjato |
| 650 | Six hundred fifty | Enem zatou inra liapoul | Dimampolo sy enin-zato |
| 700 | Seven hundred | Fitou Zatou | Fito zato |
| 1,000 | Thousand | Arrivou | Arivo |
| 10,000 | Ten thousand | Foulo Arrivou | Iray halina |
| 100,000 | One hundred thousand | Zatou Arrivou | Iray hetsy |
| 1,000,000 | Million | Ala | Tapitrisa |

== Robert Drury's southern Malagasy vocabulary (1729) ==
Robert Drury, an English sailor who spent 15 years in southern Madagascar (including Androy, Fierenana, now known as Tulear, and Menabe), collected a vocabulary of southern Malagasy words as spoken in the early 1700s, which he published in his memoirs, Madagascar, or Robert Drury's Journal, in 1729 with the assistance of Daniel Defoe.

=== Numbers in Southern Malagasy (Drury, early 18th century) ===
Numbers in Southern Malagasy (Drury), Early 18th Century
| # | Gloss | Old Southern Malagasy (Androy, Fierenana & Menabe, Early 18th c.) | Standard Malagasy |
|---|---|---|---|
| 1 | one | Eser | Isa / Iray |
| 2 | two | Roaa | Roa |
| 3 | three | folu | telo |
| 4 | four | effuchts | efatra |
| 5 | five | deeme | dimy |
| 6 | six | eanning | enina |
| 7 | seven | feeto | fito |
| 8 | eight | varlo | valo |
| 9 | nine | seve | sivy |
| 10 | ten | folo | folo |
| 13 | thirteen | folotaluambe | telo ambin'ny folo |
| 15 | fifteen | folodeeme amby | dimy ambin'ny folo |
| 17 | seventeen | folofeetoambe | fito ambin'ny folo |
| 20 | twenty | roaafolo | roapolo |
| 25 | twenty-five | rowafolo deeme amby | dimy ambin'ny roapolo |
| 30 | thirty | talofolo | telopolo |
| 35 | thirty-five | Talofulo deeme amby | dimy ambin'ny folo |
| 40 | forty | effuch folo | efapolo |
| 45 | forty-five | effuchfolo deeme amby | dimy amby efapolo |
| 50 | fifty | deemefolo | dimampolo |
| 55 | fifty-five | deemefolo deeme amby | dimy amby dimampolo |
| 60 | sixty | ennig folo | enimpolo |
| 65 | sixty-five | ennig folo deeme amby | dimy amby enin-polo |
| 70 | seventy | feeto folo | fitopolo |
| 75 | seventy-five | fetofolo deeme amby | dimy amby fitopolo |
| 80 | eighty | varlofolo | valopolo |
| 85 | eighty-five | varlofolo deeme amby | dimy amby valopolo |
| 90 | ninety | sevefolo | sivifolo |
| 95 | ninety-five | seveefolo deeme amby | dimy amby sivifolo |
| 100 | hundred | zawto | zato |
| 600 | six hundred | eanning zawto | enin-jato |
| 700 | seven hundred | feeto zawto | fito zato |
| 800 | eight hundred | varlozawto | valo zato |
| 1000 | thousand | arevo | arivo |
| 6000 | six thousand | eanning arevo | enina arivo |
| 7000 | seven thousand | feeto arevo | fito arivo |
| 8000 | eight thousand | varlo arevo | valo arivo |

=== Comparative vocabulary (Drury) ===
Comparative Vocabulary of Southern Malagasy (Robert Drury, early 1700s) and Standard Malagasy
| # | Gloss | Southern Malagasy (Drury, early 18th c.) | Standard Malagasy |
|---|---|---|---|
| 1 | South | Ateemo | Atsimo |
| 2 | Ship | Sambo | Sambo |
| 3 | Soft | Merlemma | Malemy |
| 4 | Sky | Longitchs | Lanitra |
| 5 | King | Panzaccar | Mpanjaka |
| 6 | Good | Suer | Tsara |
| 7 | Bad | Rawtche | Ratsy |
| 8 | To buy | Mevele | Mividy |
| 9 | Rope | Tolle | Tady |
| 10 | Cold | Merninchy | Mangatsiaka |
| 11 | Child | Annack | Zaza |
| 12 | Cloud | Rawho | Rahona |
| 13 | Cat | Chacker | Saka |
| 14 | Lance | Luffu | Lefona |
| 15 | Tongue | Leller | Lela |
| 16 | Teeth | Neefa | Nify |
| 17 | Sand | Fasse | Fasika |
| 18 | Salt | Serrer | Sira |
| 19 | Sugar | Serermame | Siramamy |
| 20 | Sweet | Marme | Mamy |
| 21 | White man | Verzarhar | Vazaha |
| 22 | Wet | Lay | Lena |
| 23 | Egg | Tule | Atody |
| 24 | Knife | Messu | Antsy |
| 25 | Ant | Vetick | Vitsika |
| 26 | Dark | Myeak | Maizina |
| 27 | Eye | Mossu | Maso |
| 28 | Foot | Feendeer | Tongotra |
| 29 | Fish | Feer | Trondro |
| 30 | Friend | Lonego | Namana |
| 31 | White | Fute | Fotsy |
| 32 | What ? | Eno | Inona? |
| 33 | This | Toe | Ity / Izao |
| 34 | Pistol | Plato | Poleta |
| 35 | People | Olo | Olona |
| 36 | Neck | Voozzo | Vozona |
| 37 | Moon | Vooler | Volana |
| 38 | Milk | Ronoonu | Ronono |
| 39 | Man | Loyhe | Lehilahy |
| 40 | Million | Arrla | Arivo |
| 41 | Tomorrow | Hummerwha | Rahampitso |
| 42 | Mouse | Varlarvo | Voalavo |
| 43 | Night | Aulla | Alina |
| 44 | North | Avarruchs | Avaratra |
| 45 | Net | Arratto | Harato |
| 46 | Little | Kala | Kely |
| 47 | Low | Eever | Ambany |
| 48 | Knife | Messu | Antsy |
| 49 | Horse | Suvaller | Soavaly |
| 50 | How many ? | Fera ? | Firy? |
| 51 | Hatchet | Fermackey | Famaky |
| 52 | To hear | Merray | Mihaino |
| 53 | Run | Lomoy | Mihazakazaka |
| 54 | Spoon | Suto | Sotro |
| 55 | Fat | Vonedruck | Matavy |
| 56 | Full | Fenu | Feno |
| 57 | To speak | Mevolengher | Miteny / Mivolana |
| 58 | Crow | Quark | Goaika |
| 59 | Belly | Troke | Kibo |
| 60 | Bitter | Merfaughts | Mangidy |
| 61 | Bullet | Buller | Bala |
| 62 | Bone | Towler | Taolana |
| 63 | Bread | Moffu | Mofo |
| 64 | Call | Kyhu | Miantso |
| 65 | Ear | Sofee | Sofina |
| 66 | Gun | Ampegaurrutchs | Basy |
| 67 | East | Teenongher | Atsinanana |
| 68 | Garment | Sekey / Lamber | Akanjo / Lamba |
| 69 | Small | Merlinnick | Madinika |
| 70 | Sea | Reac | Ranomasina |
| 71 | Scissors | Hette | Hety |
| 72 | Spider | Morrotongher | Hala |
| 73 | West | Andreffer | Andrefana |
| 74 | Sunday | Alhaida | Alahady |
| 75 | Monday | Alletinine | Alatsinainy |
| 76 | Tuesday | Tallorter | Talata |
| 77 | Wednesday | Alareerbeer | Alarobia |
| 78 | Thursday | Commeeshe | Alakamisy |
| 79 | Friday | Jummor | Zoma |
| 80 | Saturday | Sarbueche | Asabotsy |

== Le Gentil's records from northern and southern Madagascar (1760s) ==
During his visit to Madagascar, Guillaume Le Gentil recorded several Malagasy words, chiefly in use in the northeastern regions — particularly Antongil Bay, Sainte-Marie and Foulpointe — as well as in Fort-Dauphin. He did not provide details regarding the dialect spoken in Fort-Dauphin, mentioning only differences in greetings. His work focused primarily on the northern dialect in his book Voyage dans les mers de l'Inde, published in 1781. Le Gentil resided in Madagascar on three occasions, in 1761, 1762, and 1763.

Words in Old Malagasy Collected by Le Gentil (Southern and Northern, 1760s)
| # | Gloss | Le Gentil (Anosy, 1760s) | Le Gentil (Saint-Marie, Foulpointe & Antongil Bay, 1760s) | Standard Malagasy |
|---|---|---|---|---|
| 1 | Good morning | Salama | Finar tanao | Salama |
| 2 | Good | Soüa | Sara | Tsara |
| 3 | Money | | Vola | Vola |
| 4 | Girl | | Cala | Zazavavy |
| 5 | What's new? | | Acor cabar ? | Inona ny vaovao ? |
| 6 | Nothing new | | sis-cabar / sis | Tsisy vaovao / tsisy |
| 7 | I am fine | | pola-sara | |
| 8 | Water | | ranou | rano |
| 9 | Sea | | ranou-masse | ranomasina |
| 10 | White | | Foutchy | Fotsy |
| 11 | Silver sand | | pacem-bola | fasimbola |
| 12 | Foot | | Oung | Tongotra |
| 13 | Big / Huge | | bé | be |
| 14 | Many | | marou | maro |
| 15 | Bad | | ratchi | ratsy |
| 16 | A lot | | marou-bé | marobe |
| 17 | Ox | | aombé | omby |
| 18 | White / European | | Vasa | Vazaha |

== Claude Bernard Challan's dictionary (1773) ==
Claude Bernard Challan compiled a vocabulary in the 18th century with the help of two Malagasy slaves, primarily collecting words from central and eastern Madagascar, especially Betsimisaraka and Merina. According to Linah Ravonjiarisoa, this edition is richer and more modern, and it includes, for the first time in translation, a sample of Merina words.

In 1773, the Royal Printing House of Mauritius published his work as Challan, Claude Bernard (Abbot), Vocabulaire malgache distribué en deux parties : La première : françois et malgache – la seconde : malgache et françois, which constitutes the very first Malagasy–French and French–Malagasy dictionary.

=== Numbers and vocabulary in Challan's dictionary (1773) ===
Numbers in Old Malagasy Isle de France (Challand), 18th Century
| # | Gloss | 18th Century Malagasy (Challand, Isle de France) | Standard Malagasy |
|---|---|---|---|
| 1 | one | Rec | Iray |
| 2 | two | Roué | Roa |
| 3 | three | Télou | Telo |
| 4 | four | Effat | Efatra |
| 5 | five | Dimi | Dimy |
| 6 | six | Henne | Enina |
| 7 | seven | Fitou | Fito |
| 8 | eight | Valou | Valo |
| 9 | nine | Civi | Sivy |
| 10 | ten | Polou | Folo |
| 11 | eleven | Polou rec ambé | Iraika ambin’ny folo |
| 12 | twelve | Polou roué ambé | Roa ambin’ny folo |
| 13 | thirteen | Polou télou ambé | Telo ambin’ny folo |
| 14 | fourteen | Polou effat ambé | Efatra ambin’ny folo |
| 15 | fifteen | Polou dimi ambé | Dimy ambin’ny folo |
| 16 | sixteen | Polou henne ambé | Enina ambin’ny folo |
| 17 | seventeen | Polou fitou ambé | Fito ambin’ny folo |
| 18 | eighteen | Polou valou ambé | Valo ambin’ny folo |
| 19 | nineteen | Polou civi ambé | Sivy ambin’ny folo |
| 20 | twenty | Roué polou | Roapolo |
| 25 | twenty-five | Roué polou dimi ambé | Dimy amby roapolo |
| 30 | thirty | Télou polou | Telopolo |
| 40 | forty | Effat polou | Efapolo |
| 50 | fifty | Dimi polou | Dimampolo |
| 60 | sixty | Henne polou | Enimpolo |
| 70 | seventy | Fitou polou | Fitopolo |
| 80 | eighty | Valou polou | Valopolo |
| 90 | ninety | Civi polou | Sivifolo |
| 100 | one hundred | Zatou | Zato |
| 101 | one hundred one | Zatou rec ambé | Iray amby zato |
| 115 | one hundred fifteen | Zatou polou dimi ambé | Dimy ambin’ny folo amby zato |
| 200 | two hundred | Roué zatou | Roa zato |
| 300 | three hundred | Télou zatou | Telo zato |
| 400 | four hundred | Effat zatou | Efatra zato |
| 500 | five hundred | Dimi zatou | Diman-jato |
| 600 | six hundred | Henne zatou | Enin-jato |
| 700 | seven hundred | Fitou zatou | Fito zato |
| 800 | eight hundred | Valou zatou | Valo zato |
| 900 | nine hundred | Civi zatou | Sivy zato |
| 1000 | one thousand | Arrive | Arivo |
| 5000 | five thousand | Dimi arrive | Dimy arivo |
| 10000 | ten thousand | Polou arrive | Folo arivo |

Comparative Vocabulary of 18th Century Isle de France (Challand) Malagasy and Standard Malagasy
| # | Gloss (English) | 18th Century Malagasy (Challand, Isle de France) | Standard Malagasy |
|---|---|---|---|
| 1 | Hot | Mafanne | mafana |
| 2 | Cat | Saca | saka |
| 3 | Goat | Bingue | osy |
| 4 | Sky | Lanhits / Languets | lanitra |
| 5 | Lemon | Vouangue | voasary (voasarimakirana) |
| 6 | Chest / Trunk | Vata | vata |
| 7 | How | Acore | ahoana |
| 8 | Crow | Gouaque | Goaika |
| 9 | Rope | Tade | tady |
| 10 | To run | Mihazacazac | mihazakazaka |
| 11 | Knife | Quiche / Messou | antsy |
| 12 | Toad | Boucaette | sahona |
| 13 | Frog | Sahon | sahona |
| 14 | Spoon | Sourouc / Sorbolla | sotro |
| 15 | To give birth | mamaitte | miteraka |
| 16 | Steel | Sitily | vy |
| 17 | Needle | Filou | fanjaitra |
| 18 | Spider | Farorats | fanala |
| 19 | Plate | Capilla | lovia |
| 20 | Stick | Anguira | Tsorakazo |
| 21 | Low / Bottom | Iva | ambany |
| 22 | Good / Well | Sara | tsara |
| 23 | White | Foutchi | fotsy |
| 24 | White European | Vaza | vazaha |
| 25 | Ox / Beef | Ahombé | omby |
| 26 | Good morning/How are you ? | Finarts | manao ahoana |
| 27 | Belt | Ette | fehikibo |
| 28 | How many | Phiri | firy |
| 29 | God | Zaanhar | Zanahary |
| 30 | Medicine | Fangafoudi | fanafody |
| 31 | Equal | Mieran | mitovy |
| 32 | Devil | Belitch | devoly |
| 33 | Iron | Vi | vy |
| 34 | Woman / Wife | Veavi / Ampela | vehivavy |
| 35 | Axe | Afamaqué | famaky |
| 36 | Yellow | Hazac | mavo |
| 37 | He / She | Isi | izy |
| 38 | Day | Androu | andro |
| 39 | Sick | Mararé / Manguélo | marary |
| 40 | Bad | Ratchi | ratsy |
| 41 | Sea | Ranoumasse | ranomasina |
| 42 | Honey | Tintely | tantely |
| 43 | Noon / Midday | Antou androu | atoandro |
| 44 | Me / I | Zaho | izaho / aho |
| 45 | Month | Volanne | volana |
| 46 | Mountain | Vohitz | vohitra / tendrombohitra |
| 47 | Mister / Sir | Roandrian | Andriamatoa |
| 48 | Dead / Death | Maté | maty |
| 49 | Black | Maenti | mainty |
| 50 | To swim | Milouman / Mandaoun | milomano |
| 51 | We / Us | Zahaye | izahay / isika |
| 52 | Chili / Pepper | Saceye | sakay |
| 53 | Fish | Loc | trondro |
| 54 | Door | Tamianne / Varavanguene | varavarana |
| 55 | When | Ovienne / Ouvienne | oviana |
| 56 | Something | Raha | zavatra |
| 57 | What | Inou | inona |
| 58 | Who | Zové / Zovi | iza |
| 59 | Root | Vahatz | faka |
| 60 | Rice | Var | vary |
| 61 | Sand | Facinne | fasika |
| 62 | Dry | Mayn | maina |
| 63 | Evening | Arrive | hariva |
| 64 | Sorcerer / Witch | Ampamousavé | mpamosavy |
| 65 | Sugar | Ciramamé | siramamy |
| 66 | Tobacco | Tanbac / Nicotiana | Paraky |
| 67 | You (singular) | Hano | ianao |
| 68 | Suitcase / Luggage | Vatha | valizy |
| 69 | Belly / Stomach | Votac / Quibou | kibo |
| 70 | You (plural) | Hanareo | ianareo |
| 71 | Mother | Nini | reny / neny |
| 72 | Fool / Mad | Maoli / Addal / Leffac | adala |
| 73 | Angel | Oulis | anjely |
| 74 | Demon | Angatz | Demony |
| 75 | Devil | Belich | Devoly |
| 76 | Wine | Toc | Divay |
| 77 | Vinegar | Matsicou | Vinaigitra |

== Barthélemy Huet de Froberville's manuscripts (1816) ==
In 1816, Barthélemy Huet de Froberville compiled several major manuscripts documenting the Malagasy language in Île de France (present-day Mauritius). Although never printed, these works—particularly his French–Malagasy dictionary—were later instrumental in the development of Malagasy linguistic studies. In 1833, J. Dumont d’Urville published an extract from Froberville's Great Dictionary without acknowledging him as the author. Froberville's work inspired missionary efforts to update a new dictionary in the dialect spoken mostly in Imerina, which was later published in 1835 as the first English–Malagasy dictionary and is closer to modern-day standard Malagasy.

Comparative Vocabulary of Early 19th Century Isle de France (Froberville) Malagasy and Standard Malagasy
| # | Gloss (English) | Froberville (Isle de France, 1816) | Standard Malagasy |
|---|---|---|---|
| 1 | Man | Lahe | Lehilahy |
| 2 | Human | Hulu / Ouloun | Olona |
| 3 | Woman | Ampelle / Vave | Vehivavy |
| 4 | Father | Rai / Amproi / Baba | Ray |
| 5 | Mother | Nin / Rini / Ampoindr | Reny |
| 6 | Son | Zana Dahe | Zanakalahy |
| 7 | Children | Anak / Zenak | Zanaka |
| 8 | Brothers | Royloyhe / Analahe | Rahalahy / Analahy |
| 9 | Ant | Vitsik | Vitsika |
| 10 | White | Foutsi | Fotsy |
| 11 | Gun | Pingaratch / Ampigaratch / Ampigaratsi | Basy |
| 12 | You (Singular) | Hanau / Hano / Ano | Anao |
| 13 | You (Plural) | Anareo / Hanareo | Anareo |
| 14 | To Buy | Mividi | Mividy |
| 15 | Prophet | Antou Moua | Mpaminany |
| 16 | When | Ouvi | Oviana |
| 17 | Question | Fang Hontania | Fanontaniana |
| 18 | To Refuse | Mandaha | Mandà |
| 19 | Period (Woman) | Aret Andilou | Fadim-bolana |
| 20 | Water | Ranou | Rano |
| 21 | Knife | Kisch / Fandili / Kissou / Antsi / Mes / Messou | Antsy |
| 22 | Chicken | Akoho Vavai | Akoho |
| 23 | Cow | Ahomb / Anghomb | Omby |
| 24 | Cat | Pisl / Saka | Saka |
| 25 | Dog | Amboa / Amboua / Kiva | Alika |
| 26 | To Choose | Mifidi / Mifili | Mifidy |
| 27 | Circumcised | Mifora | Mifora |
| 28 | Sky | Langhits / Langhetch / Lanits | Lanitra |
| 29 | Pig | Lambou | Kisoa |
| 30 | Rope | Tadi / Tali | Tady |
| 31 | Crow | Gouakh | Goaika |
| 32 | To Run | Mihazak Azak / Miloumaï | Mihazakazaka |
| 33 | To Sing | Missa / Mibabou | Mihira |
| 34 | Vagina | Tingui/fouri | Fory |
| 35 | Spider | Farouratch | Fanala |
| 36 | Wood | Hazou / Kakazou | Hazo |
| 37 | Red | Mena | Mena |
| 38 | Pot | Vilagni | Vilany |
| 39 | Prostitute | Ompanheira | Mpivarotena |
| 40 | Easy | Mora | Mora |
| 41 | Leaf | Raven Kazou | Ravin-kazou |
| 42 | Fire | Afo / Mote / Langourou | Afo |
| 43 | Slave | Andevou / Dzama | Andevo |
| 44 | Thorn | Fatsi / Roui | Tsilo |
| 45 | Sword | Antsivir | Sabatra |
| 46 | Erection | Mitanghets | Dangitra |
| 47 | Liquor | Tok / Touokh / Touakh / Tokaraf | Toaka |
| 48 | Behind | Arian / Afara | Aoriana |
| 49 | Axe | Feka / Afa Makhe | Famaky |
| 50 | Siren | Zavav Andranou | Zazavavindrano |
| 51 | Every Day | Andrakala / Isandrou | Isanandro |
| 52 | Demon | Angatz | Demony |
| 53 | Church | Trangho Fissandrian | Fiangonana |
| 54 | Ghost | Sakar / Anghats | Matotoa |
| 55 | Stitch | Taretch | Tarehitra |
| 56 | To Fuck | Milela | Milely |
| 57 | To Flee | Milefa | Mitsoaka |
| 58 | Boy | Kolahe / Lalahe Mitovou | Zazalahy |
| 59 | Spoon | Sotrouk / Amanghab | Sotroka |
| 60 | Stick | Anghira / Kibaï | Kobay |
| 61 | Belt | Hetch | Fehikibo |
| 62 | Equal | Mira | Mira |
| 63 | Black | Mintin | Mainty |
| 64 | Root | Vahatr / Vahats / Fouton | Faka / Fototra |
| 65 | Sugar | Sira Mam | Siramamy |
| 66 | Angel | Malaingka / Koukou Lampou / Oulis / Dzini | Anjely |
| 67 | Wheat | Var Vazaha / Trigo | Varimbazaha |
| 68 | Seashore | Amourou Dranou Massin | Amoron-dranomasina |
| 69 | Bottle | Tawang | Tavohangy |
| 70 | Sheep | Berekh / Ahondre / Angondri Vave | Ondry |
| 71 | To burn | Mang Hourou / Mahi | Mandoro / May |

== The first English–Malagasy dictionary (1835) ==
In 1835, the first English–Malagasy dictionary was published, based largely on the Merina dialect of Imerina. This work, compiled by missionaries influenced by Froberville's earlier manuscripts, represents a significant step toward the standardization of Malagasy. It is much closer to modern standard Malagasy than earlier records, reflecting the emergence of the Merina dialect as the prestige variety that would later form the basis of official Malagasy.

Comparative Vocabulary of Malagasy in the 1835 English–Malagasy Dictionary by J. J. Freeman and Modern Malagasy
| # | Gloss (English) | Freeman (Imerina, 1835) | Modern Malagasy | |
|---|---|---|---|---|
| 1 | Man | Lehilahy | Lehilahy | |
| 2 | Thorn | Tsilo | Tsilo | |
| 3 | Prostitute | Mpiangy / Mpijejojejo | Mpivaro-tena | |
| 4 | Alphabet | Abidy | Abidy | |
| 5 | Boots | Behoty | Baoty | |
| 6 | Bribe | Tambitamby / Kolikoly | Kolikoly | |
| 7 | Conversation | Tafasiry | Resaka | |
| 8 | Angel | Iraka / Anjely | Anjely | |
| 9 | Angry | Tezitra / Vinitra | Tezitra | |
| 10 | Apple | Apoly | Paoma | |
| 11 | Butter | Rononomandry | Dibera | |
| 12 | Carrot | Karoty | Karoty | |
| 13 | Christian | Kiristiana | Kristianina | |
| 14 | To Climb | Miakatra / Mianikia | Miakatra / Mianika | |
| 15 | To Close | Mandrindrina | Manidy | |
| 16 | Cold | Mangatsiaka / Manara / Mangitsy | Mangatsiaka | |
| 17 | Color | Volony | Loko | |
| 18 | Divorce | Fisaoram-bady | Fisaraham-panambadiana | |
| 19 | Duck | Vorombazaha / Ganagana | Ganagana | |
| 20 | Dwarf | Botry / Zeny | — | |
| 21 | Ejaculation | Tora-paza / Vavaka fohifohy | Mandefa tsirinaina | |
| 22 | Fork | Fisondrona / Fitrebikia | Forosety | |
| 23 | Fornication | Filambehivavy / Fijanganjangana | Fijanganjangana | |
| 24 | Fragile | Malia / Malemy | Malemy | |
| 25 | Fruit | Voankazo | Voankazo | |
| 26 | Gas | Gasy | Entona fandrehitra | |
| 27 | Ginger | Sakamalao | Sakamalao / Sakaviro | |
| 28 | Gun | Basy | Basy | |
| 29 | Horse | Soavaly | Soavaly | |
| 30 | How | Manao akory / Akory / Manao ahoana / Ahoana | Ahoana | |
| 31 | Dog | Amboa / Alikia | Alika | |
| 32 | Medicine | Ody / Fanafody | Fanafody | |
| 33 | Middle | Afovoany / Tenatenany | Afovoany | |
| 34 | Million | Tapitrisa | Tapitrisa | |
| 35 | Needle | Fanjaitra / Filou | Fanjaitra | |
| 36 | Oil | Solikia | Menaka | |
| 37 | One | Iray / Iraikia | Iray | |
| 38 | Owl | Vorondolo | Vorondolo | |
| 39 | Ox | Omby | Omby | |
| 40 | Paint | Loko | Loko | |
| 41 | Polygamy | Famporafesana | Fampirafesana | |
| 42 | Potato | Ovim-bazaha | Ovy | |
| 43 | Poverty | Alahelo | Fahantrana | |
| 44 | Priest | Mpisorona | Pretra | |
| 45 | Purple | Manato | Volomparasy | |
| 46 | Ragamuffin | Olondratsy | Jiolahy | |
| 47 | Rebel | Mpiodina | Mpikomy | |
| 48 | Rebellion | Fiodinana | Fikomiana | |
| 49 | Here | Etikatra / Etoakatra / Etoana / Eto | Eto / Ety | |
| 50 | Judge | Andriambaventy | Mpitsara | |
| 51 | English | Angilisy | Anglisy | |
| 52 | There | Ary / Arikitra / Erikitra / Ery | Ary | |
| 53 | Musket | Bedohaka | — | |
| 54 | Bayonet | Benitra | — | |
| 55 | Enough | Etsaka | — | |
| 56 | Goose | Gisy | Gisa | |
| 57 | Razor | Hareza | Hareza | |
| 58 | This / These | Ity / Itikitra / Itony | Ity | |
| 59 | That / Those | Itsy / Itsiakatra / Itsiana | Itsy | |
| 60 | Syphilis | Kibainjatovo | — | |
| 61 | Old Man | Rangahy | — | |
| 62 | Fat | Sabora | Zabora | |
| 63 | Torn | Rota / Rovitra | Rovitra | |
| 64 | Soap | Savoha / Savony | Savony | |
| 65 | Last Year | Taonitsy | Taon-dasa | |
| 66 | Female Servant | Vadifady | — | |
| 67 | Smile | Vanikia | — | |
| 68 | Seal | Kase fanavandoko | Kase | — |
| 69 | Soldier | Sorodany / Miaramila | Miaramila | |
| 70 | Sweetheart | Sakaiza / Vazo | Sakaiza | |
| 71 | Toilet | Fiankajoana | — | |
| 72 | Twitter | Mikiaka | — | |
| 73 | To beat | Mandaboka | Mandaroka | |
| 74 | Father | Ray/Iangy | Ray | |
| 75 | Vagabond | Olomanga | — | |
| 76 | Large | Makadiry | — | |
| 77 | Prince/princess | Marolahy | — | |

== See also ==
- Malagasy language
