= Holoea =

Young stellar object in the constellation Auriga

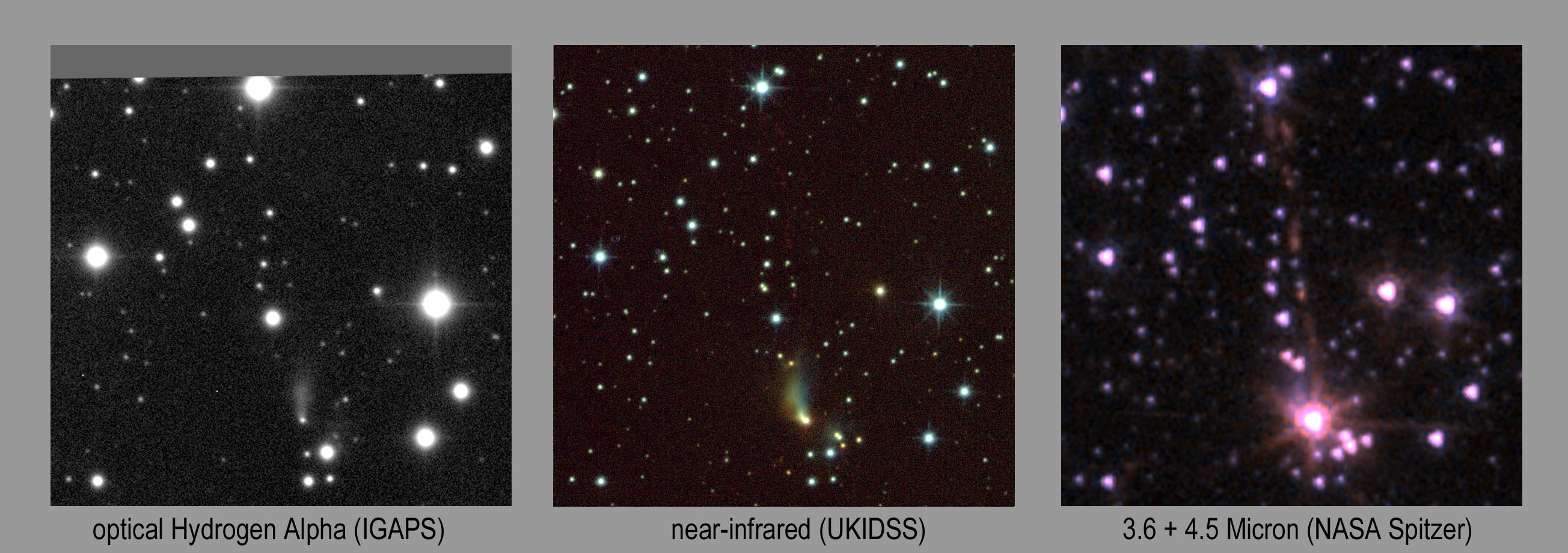
- Holoea and its outflow at different wavelengths

Observation data Epoch J2000 Equinox ICRS
- Constellation: Auriga
- Right ascension: 05^{h} 36^{m} 05.97472^{s}
- Declination: +34° 06′ 11.8671″
- Apparent magnitude (V): 18.62

Characteristics
- Evolutionary stage: young stellar object
- Spectral type: K2III
- Apparent magnitude (J): 13.40±0.03
- Apparent magnitude (H): 11.975±0.028
- Apparent magnitude (K): 10.487±0.022

Astrometry
Proper motion (μ)	RA: −3.699 mas/yr Dec.: +2.073 mas/yr
Parallax (π)	1.8769±0.7955 mas
Distance	approx. 1,700 ly (approx. 500 pc)

Details
Mass	~1.5 M_{☉}
Age	0.193±0.063 Myr

Other designations
- Holoea, IRAS 05327+3404, 2MASS J05360598+3406120, SMM 1, S3

Database references
SIMBAD	data

Holoea, designated IRAS 05327+3404, is a young stellar object in the constellation Auriga, in the direction of the star cluster Messier 36. It may not be part of M36, but may instead be part of the more distant star-forming region S235; alternatively, it may represent ongoing star formation in M36. Holoea is a rare transitional object between class I (protostars) and class II (pre-main-sequence stars). It is surrounded by large amounts of circumstellar material, including outflowing jets.

The outflow was first observed in 1993 with the MDM Observatory at Kitt Peak, Arizona, with follow-up observations by the James Clerk Maxwell Telescope at Mauna Kea, Hawaii. The discovery was published in 1996 and given the name Holoea, Hawaiian for "flowing gas". The name was officially approved by the IAU Working Group on Star Names on 18 April 2026.

Images of Holoea show a nebulous "tail", while spectroscopic observations indicate the presence of bipolar jets. The spectra are unusual; they appear to represent two views of the jets from different angles, one the result of reflection off the "tail". The star itself is seen directly, not via a reflection. Holoea is similar to L1551 IRS 5, an FU Orionis star. It has a large circumstellar disk that extends from 24.5±0.15 au to 690±12 au. A 2013 study found two sources of emission in submillimeter wavelengths: the source designated SMM 1 corresponds to Holoea, while SMM 2 is a second, nearby young stellar object which may be a binary companion of Holoea.

The discovery of Holoea led to searches for other transitional young stellar objects. A pair of such objects, called MB 4, has been found in the direction of Camelopardalis.

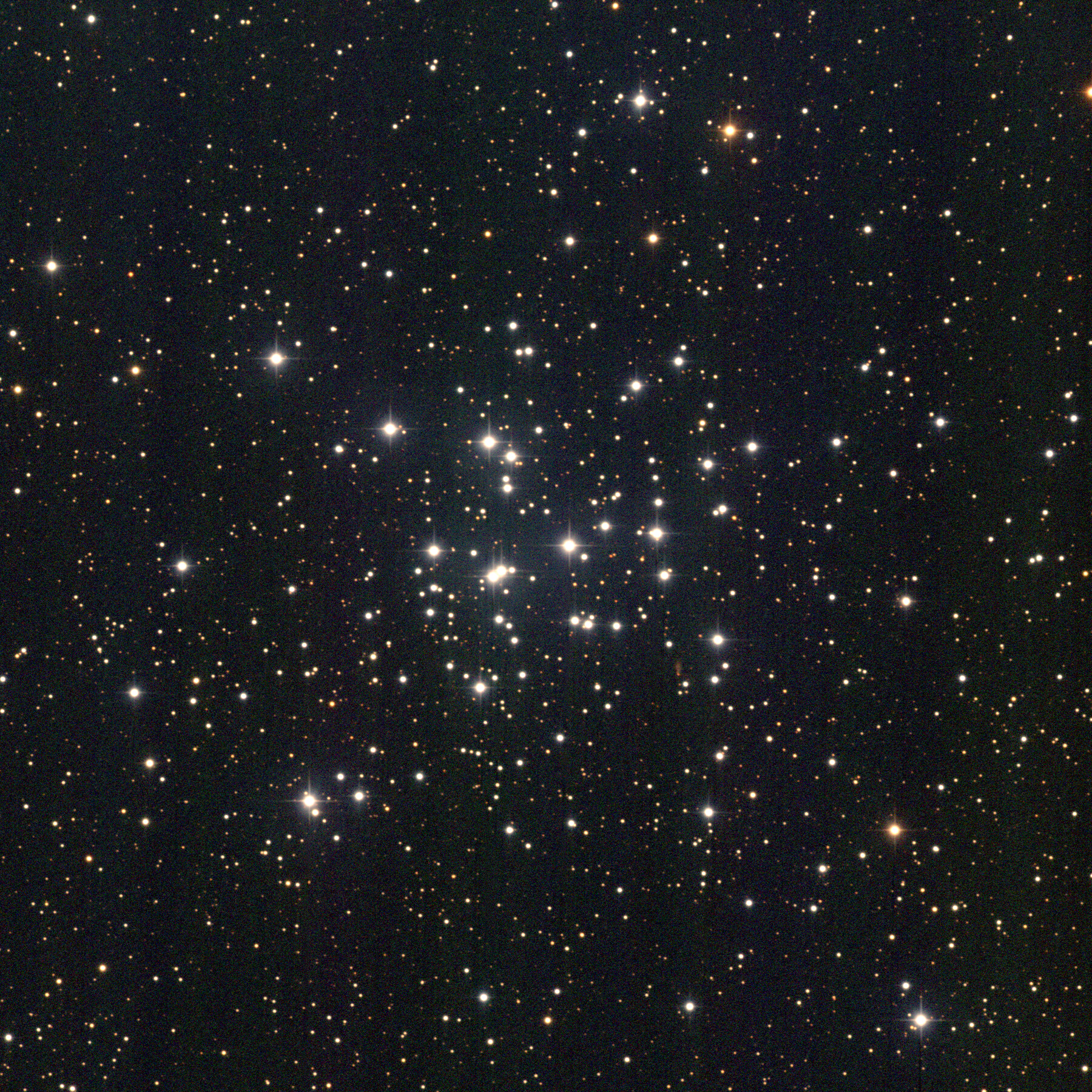
A photograph of M36, with Holoea circled

== See also ==
- Welopōʻai, another star with a Hawaiian name
