= Messier 38 =

Open cluster in the constellation Auriga

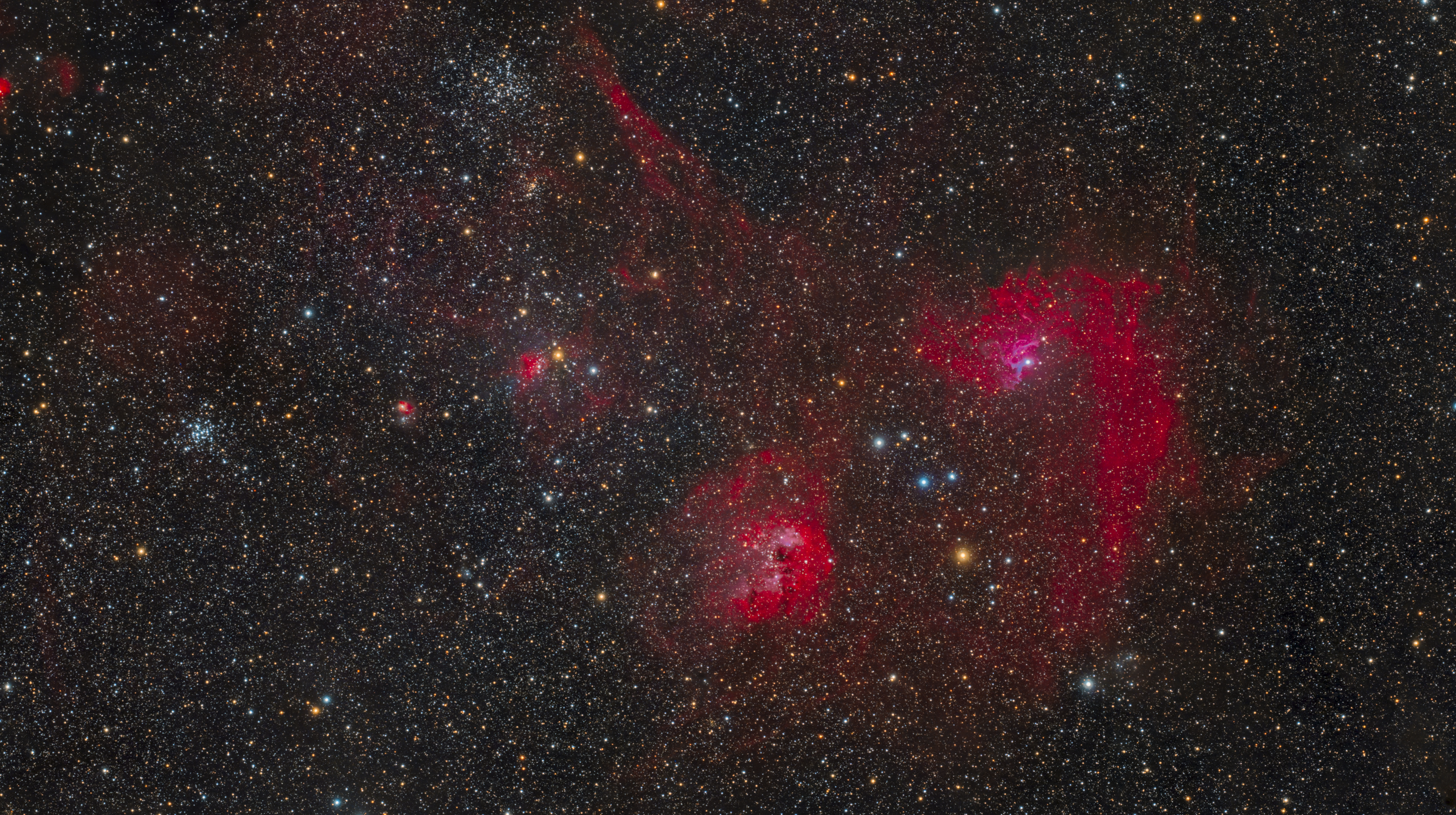
- M38 (top) and surroundings

Observation data (J2000.0 epoch)
- Right ascension: 05^{h} 28^{m} 43^{s}
- Declination: +35° 51′ 18″
- Distance: 3,480 ly (1.066 kpc)
- Apparent magnitude (V): 7.4
- Apparent dimensions (V): 21′

Physical characteristics
- Radius: 4pc. (13 ly.)
- Estimated age: 250 Myr
- Other designations: NGC 1912

Associations
- Constellation: Auriga

Messier 38 or M38, also known as NGC 1912 or Starfish Cluster, is an open cluster of stars in the constellation of Auriga. It was discovered by Giovanni Batista Hodierna before 1654 and independently found by Guillaume Le Gentil in 1749. The open clusters M36 and M37, also discovered by Hodierna, are often grouped together with M38. Distance is about 1.066 kpc (3,480 ly) away from Earth. The open cluster NGC 1907 lies nearby on the sky, but the two are most likely just experiencing a fly-by, having originated in different parts of the galaxy.

== Description ==
The cluster's brightest stars form a pattern resembling the Greek letter Pi or, according to Webb, an "oblique cross". Walter Scott Houston described its appearance as follows:

Photographs usually show a departure from circularity, a feature quite evident to visual observers. Older reports almost always mention a cross shape, which seems more pronounced with small instruments. A view with a 24-inch reflector on a fine Arizona night showed the cluster as irregular, and the host of stars made fruitless any effort to find a geometrical figure.

At its distance of 1066 pc., its angular diameter of about 20 arc minutes corresponds to about 4.0 parsecs (13 light years), similar to that of its more distant neighbor M37. It is of intermediate age at about 290 million years. From the population of about 100 stars, this open cluster features a prominent yellow giant with the apparent magnitude +7.9 and spectral type G0 as its brightest member. This corresponds to an absolute magnitude of -1.5, or a luminosity of 900 Suns. For comparison, the Sun would appear as a faint magnitude +15.3 star from the distance of M38.

== Components ==
NAME	Right ascension	Declination	Spectral Type
HD 35519	05^{h} 26^{m} 54.32^{s}	+35° 27' 26.2	K2
NGC 1912 HOAG 2			B5II-III
NGC 1912 HOAG 3			
NGC 1912 HOAG 4	05^{h} 28^{m} 35.39^{s}	+35° 52' 51.2'	A0V
NGC 1912 HOAG 5	05^{h} 28^{m} 50.73^{s}	+35° 46' 47.2	A0Vn
NGC 1912 HOAG 6	05^{h} 28^{m} 10.46^{s}	+35° 55' 26.0	A0:V
NGC 1912 HOAG 7	05^{h} 28^{m} 34.25^{s}	+35° 53' 29.7	A2V
NGC 1912 HOAG 11			
NGC 1912 HOAG 19			K2IIIb
NGC 1912 HOAG 104			G5III
NGC 1912 SS G2			
NGC 1912 HOAG 128			K0III
NGC 1912 SS G4			A5:V
NGC 1912 HOAG 153			K0V
NGC 1912 SS G3			A3V
NGC 1912 HOAG 160			K1IV
NGC 1912 HOAG 161			G5V
NGC 1912 HOAG 171			G7IV
NGC 1912 HOAG 172			

== Gallery ==
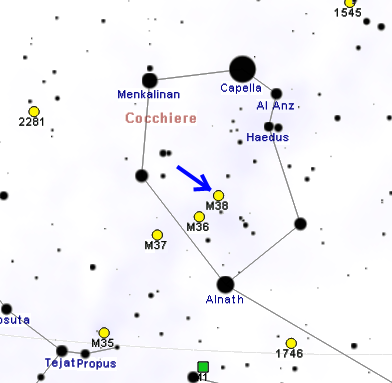
Chart of Auriga showing the location of M38

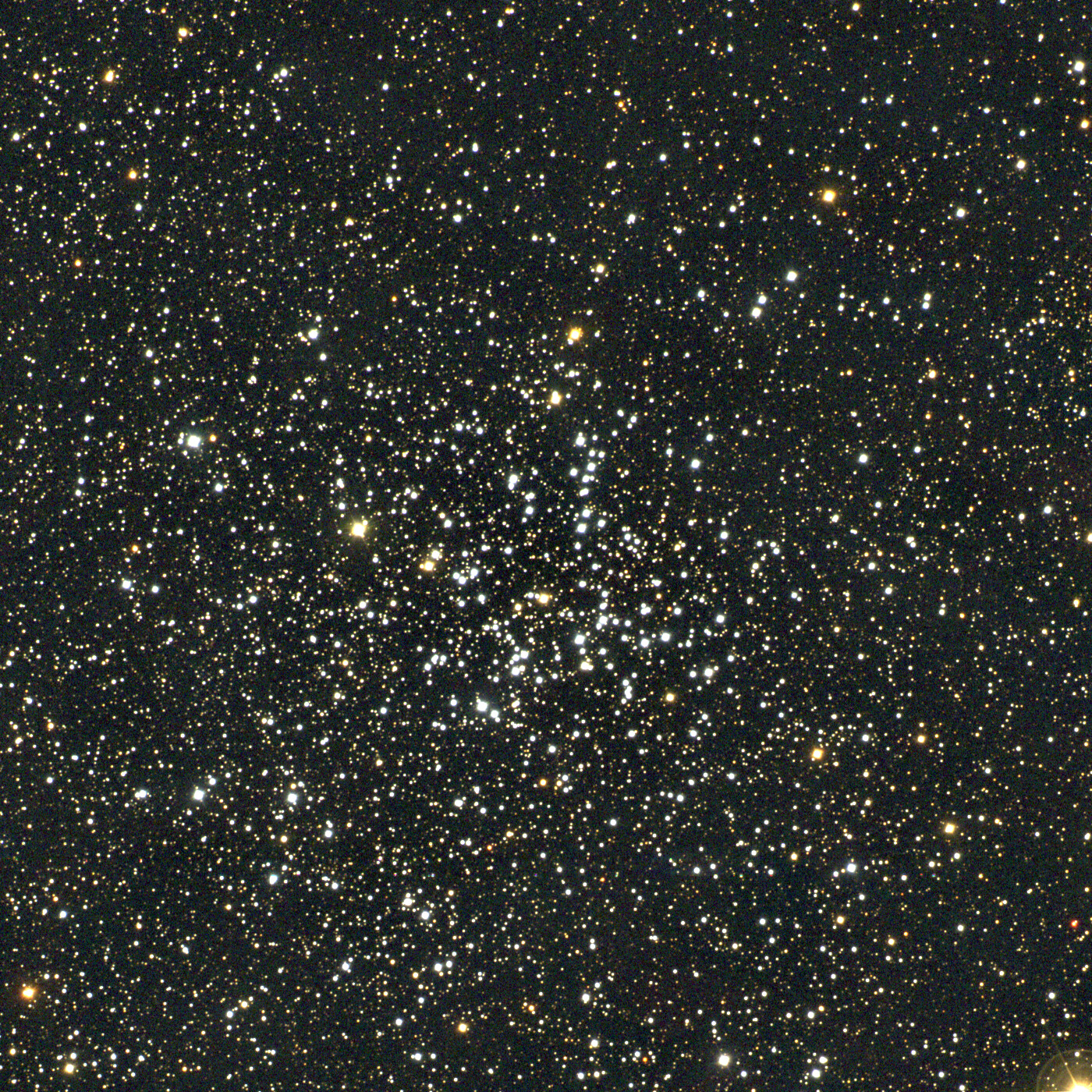
Closeup of Messier 38

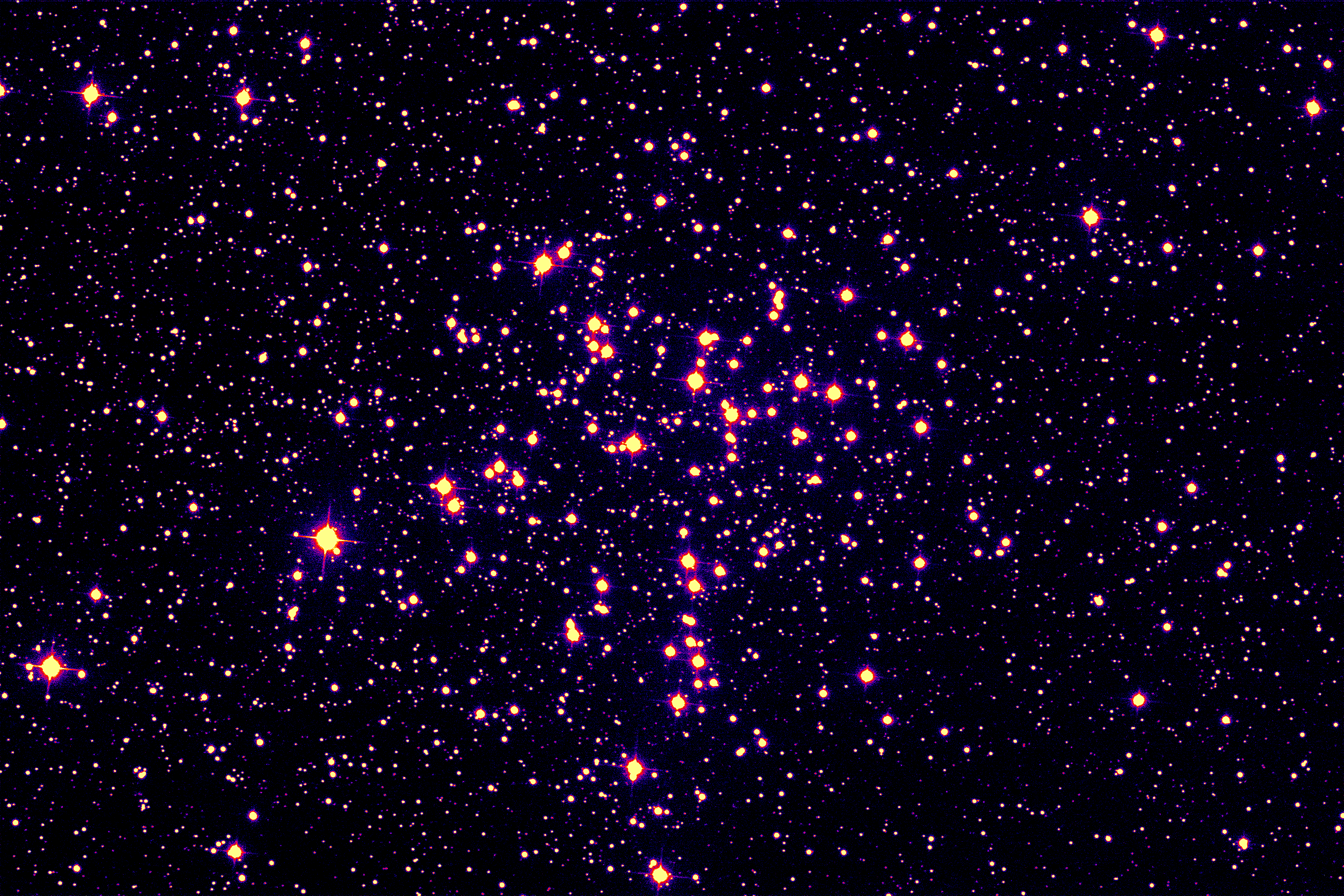
M38 in V band (north is down, east to the left)

== See also ==
- List of Messier objects
- Messier 36
- Messier 37
