= Laurain =

Laurain is a surname. Notable people with the surname include:

- Antoine Laurain (born 1972), French writer
- Jean Laurain (1921–2008), French politician
