= Guillaume Le Gentil =

French astronomer (1725–1792)

- Born: Guillaume Joseph Hyacinthe Jean-Baptiste Le Gentil de la Galaisière; 11 or 12 September 1725; Coutances, France
- Died: 22 October 1792 (aged 67); Paris, France
- Known for: M32
- Scientific career
- Fields: Astronomy

Guillaume Joseph Hyacinthe Jean-Baptiste Le Gentil de la Galaisière (French pronunciation: [ɡijom lə ʒɑ̃ti], 11 or 12 September 1725 – 22 October 1792) was a French astronomer who discovered several nebulae and was appointed to the Royal Academy of Sciences. He wrote on the estimation of the distance from the Earth to the Sun using solar transits, made unsuccessful attempts to observe the 1761 and 1769 transits of Venus from India during an 11-year journey from France, and wrote a popular account of his adventures and misadventures during the journey.

== Biography ==
Guillaume Le Gentil was born on 11 or 12 September 1725 (Note: Either date appears in reliable sources dating back to the early 19th century.) in Coutances and first intended to enter the church before turning to astronomy when inspired by a lecture by Joseph-Nicolas Delisle. By 1753 he was a professional astronomer and he wrote influentially on the subject of estimating the distance from the Earth to the Sun, the astronomical unit (AU), using transits of Mercury. He argued, contra Edmond Halley, that these transits could not be used for an accurate measurement of the AU. He discovered what are now known as the Messier objects M32, M36 and M38, as well as the nebulosity in M8, and he was the first to catalogue the dark nebula sometimes known as Le Gentil 3 (in the constellation Cygnus).

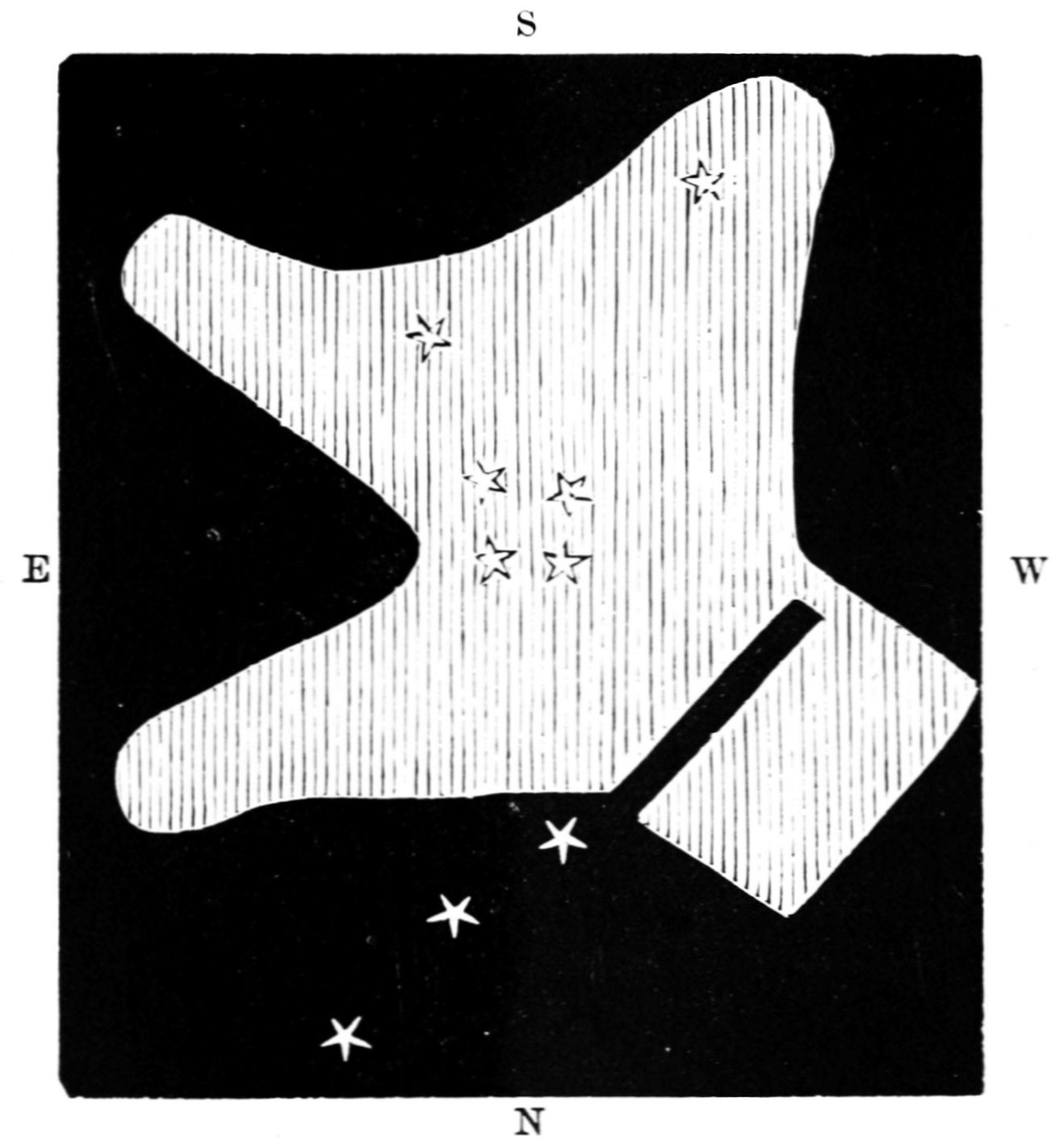
Le Gentil's drawing of the Orion Nebula.

He was part of the international collaborative project organized by Mikhail Lomonosov to measure the distance to the Sun, by observing the transit of Venus at different points on the earth. Edmond Halley had suggested the idea, but it required careful measurements from different places on earth, and the project was launched with more than a hundred observers dispatched to different parts of the globe to observe the transit coming up in 1761.

As a part of the French expedition, Le Gentil set out for Pondicherry, a French possession in India. He set out from Paris in March 1760, and reached Isle de France (now Mauritius) in July. However, the Seven Years' War had broken out between France and Britain in the meantime, hindering further passage east. He finally managed to gain passage on a frigate that was bound for India's Coromandel Coast, and he sailed in March 1761 with the intention of observing the transit from Pondicherry. Even though the transit was only a few months away, he was assured that they would make it in time. The ship was blown off-course by unfavorable winds and spent five weeks at sea. By the time it finally got close to Pondicherry, the captain learned that the British had occupied the city, so the frigate was obliged to return to Isle de France. When 6 June came the sky was clear, but the ship was still at sea, and he could not take astronomical observations with the vessel rolling about.

Having already completed the trip from Paris, he stayed for the next transit of Venus, which would come in another eight years (they occur in pairs 8 years apart, but each pair is separated from the next by 121 or 105 years). After spending some time mapping the eastern coast of Madagascar, he decided to record the 1769 transit from Manila in the Philippines. Encountering hostility from the Spanish authorities there, he headed back to Pondicherry, which had been restored to France by peace treaty in 1763, where he arrived in March 1768. He built a small observatory to view the transit. On the day of the event, 4 June 1769, the sky became overcast, and Le Gentil saw nothing.

The return trip was first delayed by dysentery, and further when his ship was caught in a storm and dropped him off at Île Bourbon (Réunion), where he had to wait until a Spanish ship took him home. He finally arrived in Paris in October 1771, having been away for eleven years, only to find that he had been declared legally dead and been replaced in the Royal Academy of Sciences. His wife had remarried, and all his relatives had "enthusiastically plundered his estate". Due to shipwrecks and wartime attacks on ships, none of the letters he had sent to the academy or to his relatives had reached their destinations. Lengthy litigation and the intervention of the king were ultimately required before he recovered his seat in the academy and remarried.

During the time he spent in India, Le Gentil examined local astronomical traditions and wrote several notes on the topic. He reported that the duration of the lunar eclipse of 30 August 1765 was predicted by a Tamil astronomer, based on the computation of the size and extent of the earth-shadow, and was found short by 41 seconds, whereas the charts of Tobias Mayer were wrong by 68 seconds.

He died in Paris on 22 October 1792.

== Catalogue ==
Le Gentil memoir from 1749 contains:

1. Messier 32
2. Lagoon Nebula
3. Le Gentil 3
4. Messier 41
5. Messier 36
6. Messier 38

Aside from M41 previously found by John Flamsteed, the others are considered to have been first found or discovered independently by Le Gentil.

== Play and opera ==
Le Gentil is the subject of a play by Canadian playwright Maureen Hunter. Transit of Venus was first produced at the Manitoba Theatre Centre in 1992. It was subsequently made into an opera of the same name with music by Victor Davies, presented by Manitoba Opera in 2007, and Opera Carolina in 2010.

== Literature ==
Le Gentil is the subject of a novel by Antoine Laurain Les Caprices d'un astre, published in 2022, and translated into English in 2023 as An Astronomer in Love .

== Tributes ==
Boulevard Legentil-de-la-Galaisière, one of the main streets in his home town Coutances, was named after him in 1866. Le Gentil crater on the Moon was named in his honour in 1935, (Note: The location of Le Gentil crater was changed in 1961, alongside two others out of the 614 craters named in 1935. The reason for changing its location (giving the name to another crater instead) is unknown.) and asteroid 12718 Le Gentil in 2004.
