= Le Gentil 3 =

Large dark nebula located in the Cygnus constellation

Nebula
- Map of the Cygnus constellation which Le Gentil 3 is located in

Observation data: J2000 epoch
- Subtype: Dark nebula
- Right ascension: 21h 16m 49s
- Declination: +50° 46' 12"
- Constellation: Cygnus
- Designations: Globular filament 7, GF 7, Northern Inkspot

Le Gentil 3 (also known as Globular Filament 7 or GF 7 and sometimes called the Northern Inkspot) is a very large filementary dark nebula complex located in the constellation of Cygnus. The nebula is part of a larger complex called Cygnus OB7 and lies towards the western end of the Radcliffe wave. It was named after the French astronomer Guillaume Le Gentil who observed and cataloged Le Gentil 3 in the 1700s.

This nebula can be easily observed with the unaided eye from a true-dark sky observing site.

== Observation ==
Le Gentil 3 was named after famous 18th century French astronomer Guillaume Le Gentil who first noted it in the year 1749 in his journal that it “seems opaque and very dark”.
