= HD 35519 =

Star in the constellation Auriga

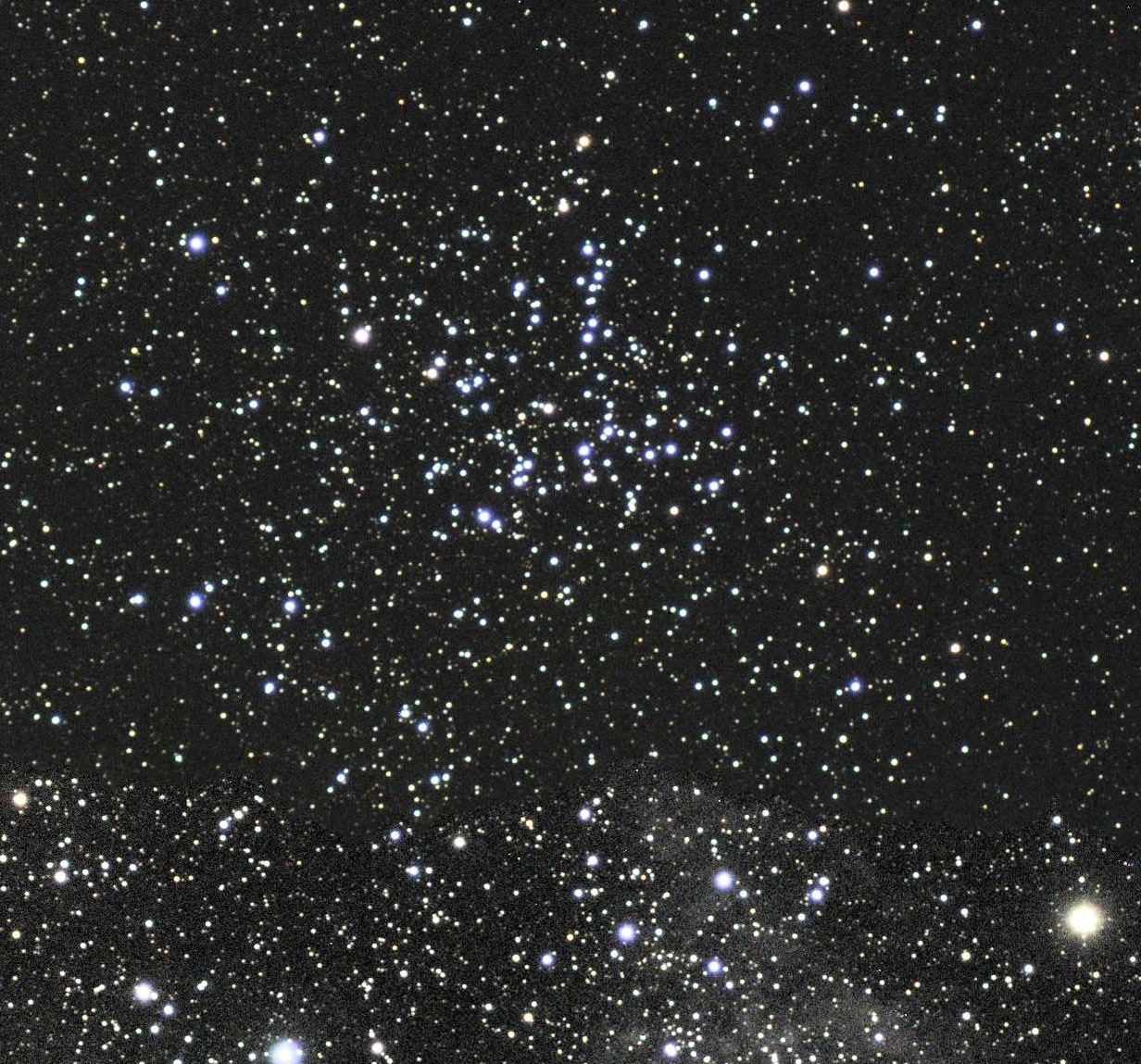
- HD 35519 is the bright star next to the lower right corner in this picture of star cluster Messier 38

Observation data Epoch J2000 Equinox ICRS
- Constellation: Auriga
- Right ascension: 05^{h} 26^{m} 54.31751^{s}
- Declination: +35° 27′ 26.1855″
- Apparent magnitude (V): 6.3062±0.0008

Characteristics
- Spectral type: K7III
- Apparent magnitude (G): 5.66
- U−B color index: +1.68
- B−V color index: +1.45

Astrometry
| Radial velocity (R_{v}) | −20.28±0.13 km/s |
| Proper motion (μ) | RA: −14.565±0.055 mas/yr Dec.: −11.452±0.031 mas/yr |
| Parallax (π) | 4.6665±0.0372 mas |
| Distance | 699 ± 6 ly (214 ± 2 pc) |
| Absolute magnitude (M_{V}) | −0.08 |

Details
| Mass | 2.7 M_{☉} |
| Radius | 30 R_{☉} |
| Luminosity | 259 L_{☉} |
| Surface gravity (log g) | 1.50 cgs |
| Temperature | 4,265 K |
| Metallicity [Fe/H] | −0.084±0.093 dex |
| Age | 5.6 Gyr |

Other designations
- BD+35°1102, FK5 2408, HD 35519, HIP 25476, HR 1794, SAO 58029, Gaia DR3 182940906456370304

Database references
| SIMBAD | data |

HD 35519 is a K-type giant star in the direction of open cluster Messier 38. It was once treated as a cluster member, but is now known to be a foreground object located at a distance of about 699 light-years (214 pc).

The star has expanded to about 30 times the Sun's radius and radiates around 259 times the Sun's luminosity at a temperature of about 4,265 K. HD 35519 is 5.6 billion years old and has 2.7 times the Sun's mass. At an apparent visual magnitude of 6.3062, the star is visible to the naked eye under good viewing conditions.
