= Welopōʻai =

Hierarchical triple star system

- Welopōʻai A (red dwarf Aa; the white dwarf Ab is too close to separate) and the white dwarf Welopōʻai B, 14.6″ away.

Observation data Epoch J2000 Equinox ICRS
- Constellation: Cepheus
- A
- Right ascension: 21^{h} 51^{m} 38.15286^{s}
- Declination: +59° 17′ 40.0078″
- Apparent magnitude (V): 10.64
- B
- Right ascension: 21^{h} 51^{m} 40.10769^{s}
- Declination: +59° 17′ 34.8550″

Characteristics

A
- Evolutionary stage: main sequence
- Spectral type: M4V

B
- Evolutionary stage: white dwarf
- Spectral type: DAH

Astrometry

B (Note: The proper motions and parallax for the A component are unreliable as they do not account for the binary's large astrometric orbit, assuming instead uniform linear motion in the space as expected for a single star or a system with a very short or very long orbit. The astrometric values for B are reliable and expected to be approximately the same for the A component.)
Proper motion (μ)	RA: −86.742 mas/yr Dec.: −19.237 mas/yr
Parallax (π)	118.1551±0.0155 mas
Distance	27.604 ± 0.004 ly (8.463 ± 0.001 pc)

Orbit
Primary	Aa
Secondary	Ab
Period (P)	3590+12 −13 d (9.83±0.03 yr)
Semi-major axis (a)	4.644±0.017 au
Eccentricity (e)	0.1898+0.0016 −0.0015
Inclination (i)	81.2±1.6°
Longitude of the node (Ω)	193.37±0.52°

Orbit
Primary	A
Secondary	B
Period (P)	>1000 yr
Semi-major axis (a)	14.64" (123.9 au)

Details

Aa
Mass	0.4189+0.0073 −0.0072 M_{☉}
Radius	0.442±0.013 R_{☉}
Surface gravity (log g)	4.770±0.027 cgs
Temperature	3365±60 K
Rotation	46.84+0.56 −0.61 days

Ab
Mass	0.6180+0.0046 −0.0045 M_{☉}
Radius	0.01201±0.00042 or 0.01229±0.00043 R_{☉}
Surface gravity (log g)	8.05±0.03 or 8.07±0.03 cgs
Temperature	5190±340 or 5210±320 K
Age	9.0+3.1 −1.9 or 9.0+3.1 −2.3 Gyr

B
Mass	0.564±0.003 M_{☉}
Radius	0.01241 ± 0.00094 (Note: Calculated, using the Stefan–Boltzmann law and the star's effective temperature and luminosity, with respect to the solar nominal effective temperature of 5772 K: $$\sqrt{\biggl(\frac{5772}{5182}\biggr)^4 \cdot 10^{-4}} = 0.01241\ R_\odot.$$) R_{☉}
Luminosity	0.00010+0.00002 −0.00001 L_{☉}
Surface gravity (log g)	7.970±0.004 cgs
Temperature	5075±7 K
Age	10.8+2.2 −2.3 Gyr

Other designations
- Welopōʻai, WDS J21516+5918
- A: TYC 3980-1081-1, IRAS 21500+5903
- B: WD 2150+591, UCAC4 747-070768

Database references
SIMBAD	A
- B

Welopōʻai is a hierarchical triple star system located 27.6 light-years (8.5 parsecs) away in the constellation Cepheus. It consists of an M4 red dwarf and two white dwarf companions. The system is nearby and offers direct constraints on common envelope stellar evolution and triple system stability. The white dwarf Welopōʻai B (WD 2150+591) has a detected magnetic field.

== History of observations ==
The system was first catalogued by the IRAS satellite in the 1980s as IRAS 21500+5903. It is also designated TYC 3980-1081-1 in the Tycho-2 Catalogue. It remained little-studied until 2014, when it was first estimated to be a nearby star; its parallax was first measured in 2016. A white dwarf companion (component B) was identified in 2018 from Gaia DR1 data.

The discovery of a second white dwarf (component Ab) was announced in 2026. It was first noticed in Doppler spectroscopy observations while searching for exoplanets, and directly detected in follow-up observations by the Gemini Observatory. The discoverers named the system Welopōʻai, which is composed of the Hawaiian words welo, referring to an inherited or family trait, and pōʻai, denoting an orbit or encircling path. The name acknowledges that observations of this system were obtained on Maunakea, Hawaii.

== Gallery ==
The same close-up without labels.

Wider field (about 1° across) with A and B marked.

The wider field without labels.

== See also ==
- Holoea, another star with a Hawaiian name
- List of smallest known stars
