= Messier 36 =

Open cluster in the constellation Auriga

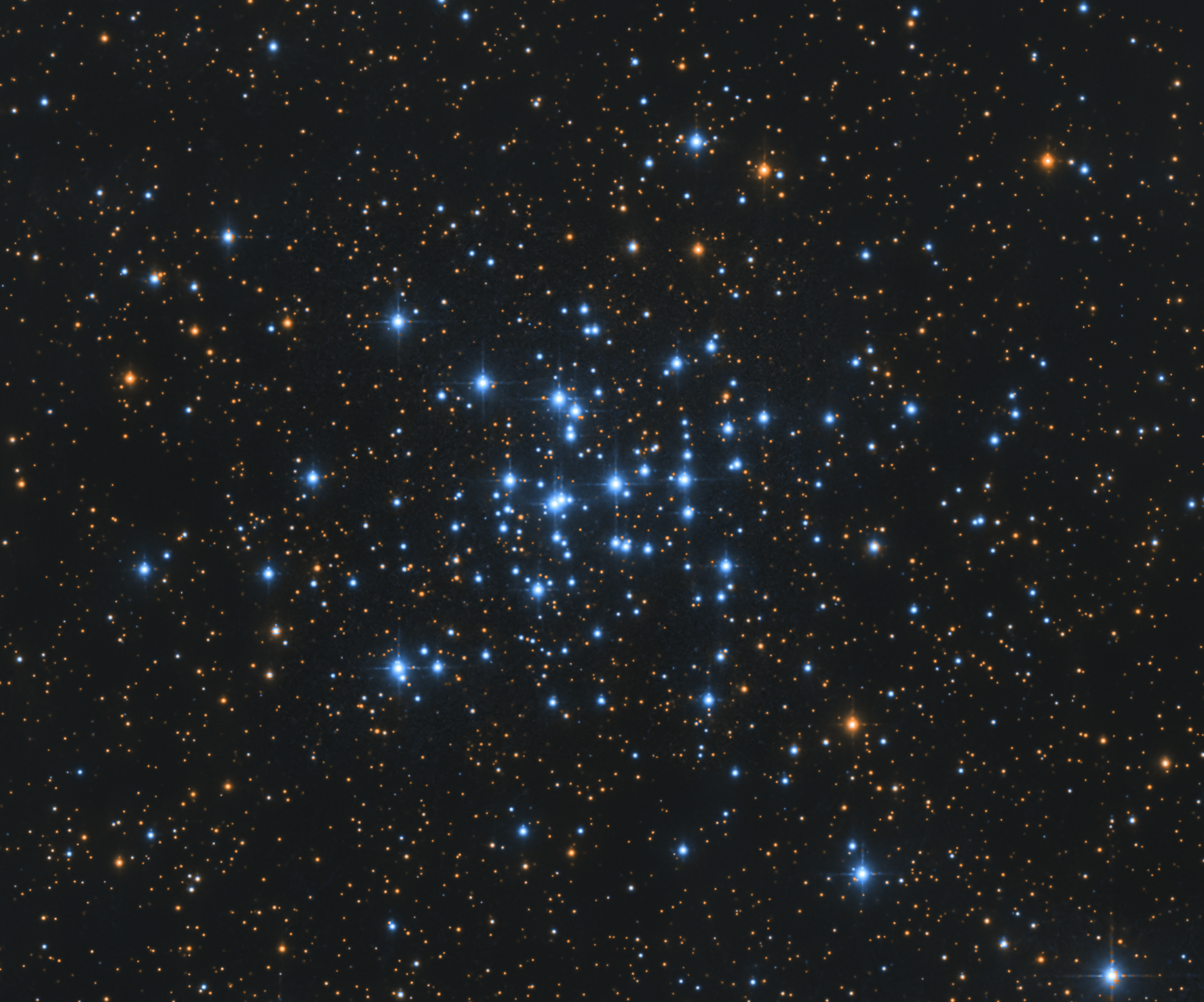
- M36 showing bright, young B-type stars

Observation data (J2000.0 epoch)
- Right ascension: 05^{h} 36^{m} 18.0^{s}
- Declination: +34° 08′ 24″
- Distance: 4.34 ± 0.87 kly (1.330 ± 0.266 kpc)
- Apparent magnitude (V): 6.3
- Apparent dimensions (V): 12'

Physical characteristics
- Mass: 746+606 −334 M_{☉} M_{☉}
- Radius: 7 ly
- Estimated age: 25.1 Myr
- Other designations: C 0532+341, M 36, NGC 1960, OCl 445

Associations
- Constellation: Auriga

Messier 36 or M36, also known as NGC 1960 or the Pinwheel Cluster, is an open cluster of stars in the somewhat northern constellation Auriga. It was discovered by Giovanni Batista Hodierna before 1654, who described it as a nebulous patch. The cluster was independently re-discovered by Guillaume Le Gentil in 1749, then Charles Messier observed it in 1764 and added it to his catalogue. It is about 1,330 pc (4,340 light years) away from Earth. The cluster is very similar to the Pleiades cluster (M45), and if as far away it would be of similar apparent magnitude.

This cluster has an angular diameter of 10′ and a core radius of 3.2′. It has a mass of roughly 746 M_{☉} and a linear tidal radius of 10.6 ± 1.6 parsecs (34.6 ± 5.2 ly). Based upon photometry, the age of the cluster has been estimated by Wu et al. (2009) as 25.1 Myr and 26.3+3.2
−5.2 Myr by Bell et al. (2013). The luminosity of the stars that have not yet depleted their lithium implies an age of 22±4 Myr, in good agreement with these older estimates.

M36 includes ten stars with a visual magnitude brighter than 10, and 178 down to magnitude 14. 38 members display an infrared excess, with one being particularly high. There is one candidate B-type variable star, of 9th magnitude.

A 2020 study of the variable stars in the cluster estimated a new closer distance of 3,800 light years from Earth.

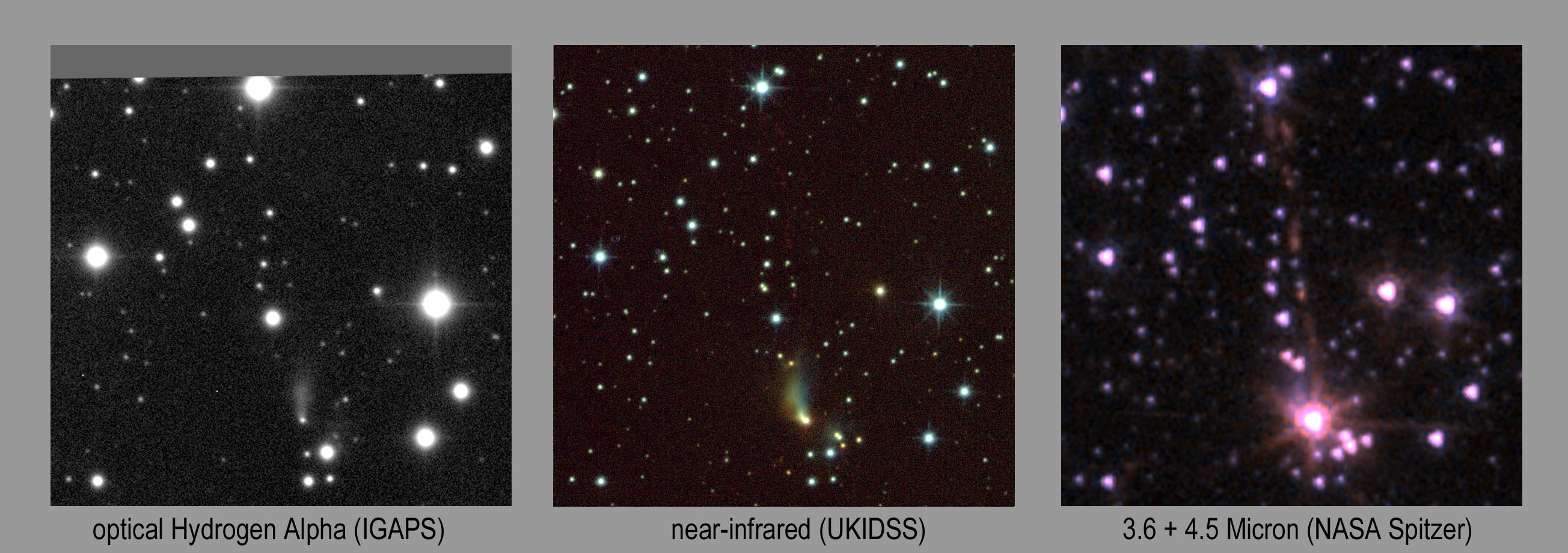
The YSO Holoea in M36 and the outflow at different wavelengths.

A young stellar object with an outflow, associated with the infrared source IRAS 05327+3404 was discovered in optical observations of M36. The object is nicknamed "Holoea", Hawaiian for "flowing gas". Despite appearing close to M36, it is probably not a part of M36, but instead it may be a member of the more distant S235 region. The young star driving the outflow was classified as transitional between class I and class II and appears to be surrounded by large amounts of circumstellar material.

== Map ==
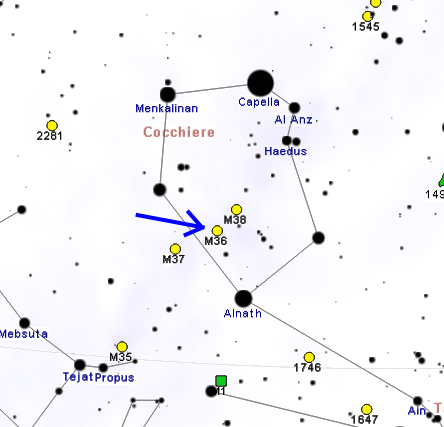
Map

== See also ==
- List of Messier objects
