= L1551 IRS 5 =

Star in the constellation Taurus

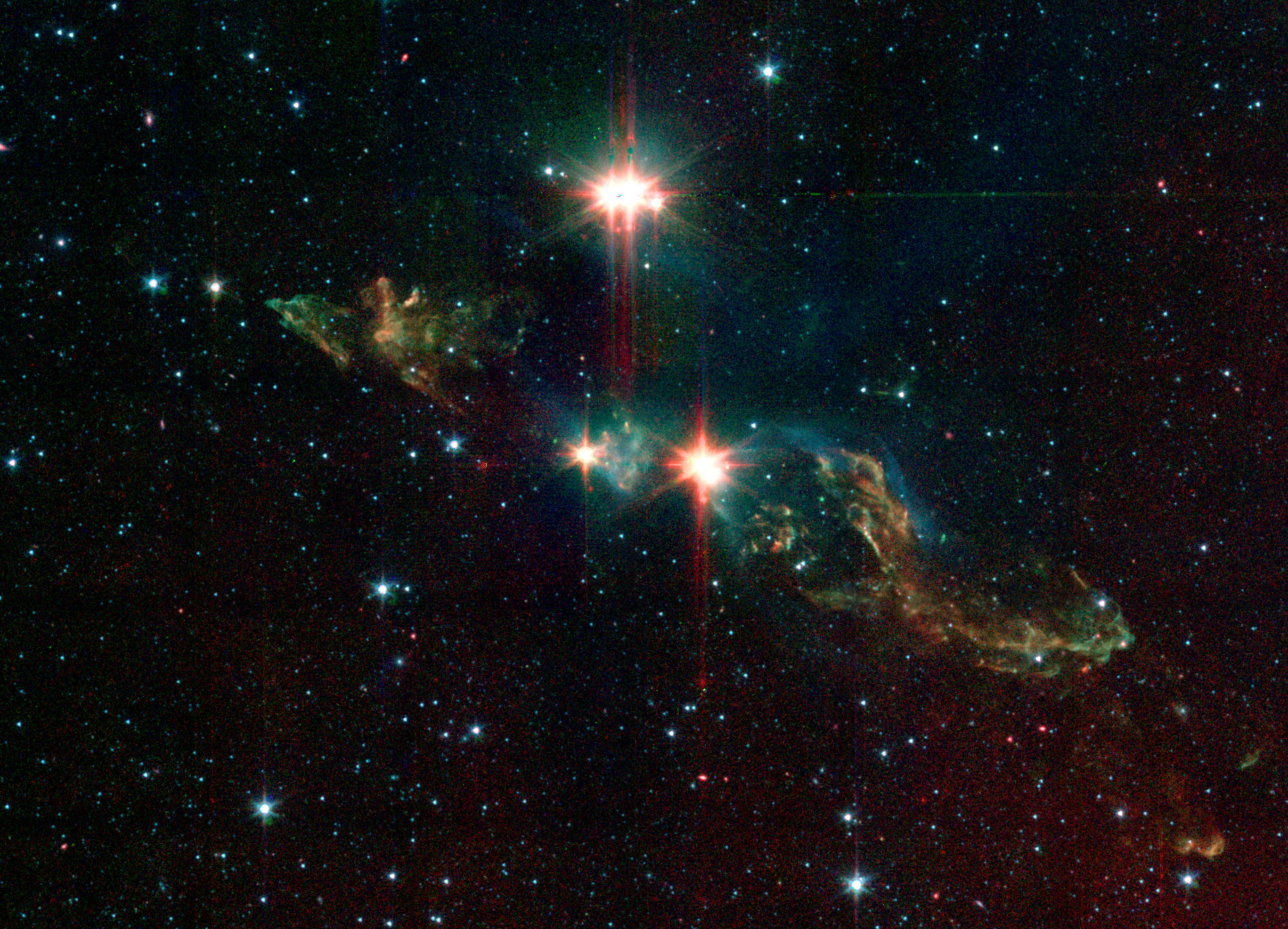
- HH 154 in mid-infrared around L1551 IRS 5 (bright red star in the middle) and L1551 NE (less bright red star to the left); Credit: NASA Spitzer Space Telescope

Observation data Epoch J2000 Equinox J2000
- Constellation: Taurus
- Right ascension: 04^{h} 31^{m} 34.077^{s}
- Declination: +18° 08′ 04.90″

Characteristics
- Spectral type: K3V/M3III

Astrometry
Distance	450 ly (140 pc)

Details

A
Mass	0.68 M_{☉}
Radius	4 R_{☉}
Luminosity	4.2 L_{☉}

B
Mass	0.13 M_{☉}

Other designations
- L551 IRS 5, 2MASS J04313407+1808049, IRAS 04287+1801, WISE J043134.12+180804.9 EPIC 210683818

Database references
SIMBAD	data

L1551 IRS 5 is a protostellar envelope surrounding a binary protostar system in the constellation of Taurus 450 light-years from Earth. The binary system itself is known as L1551 NE, and each star is surrounded by protoplanetary disk. The system is one of Jim Kaler's The 100 greatest stars.

The binary is surrounded by a complex, gas-rich protoplanetary disk system.

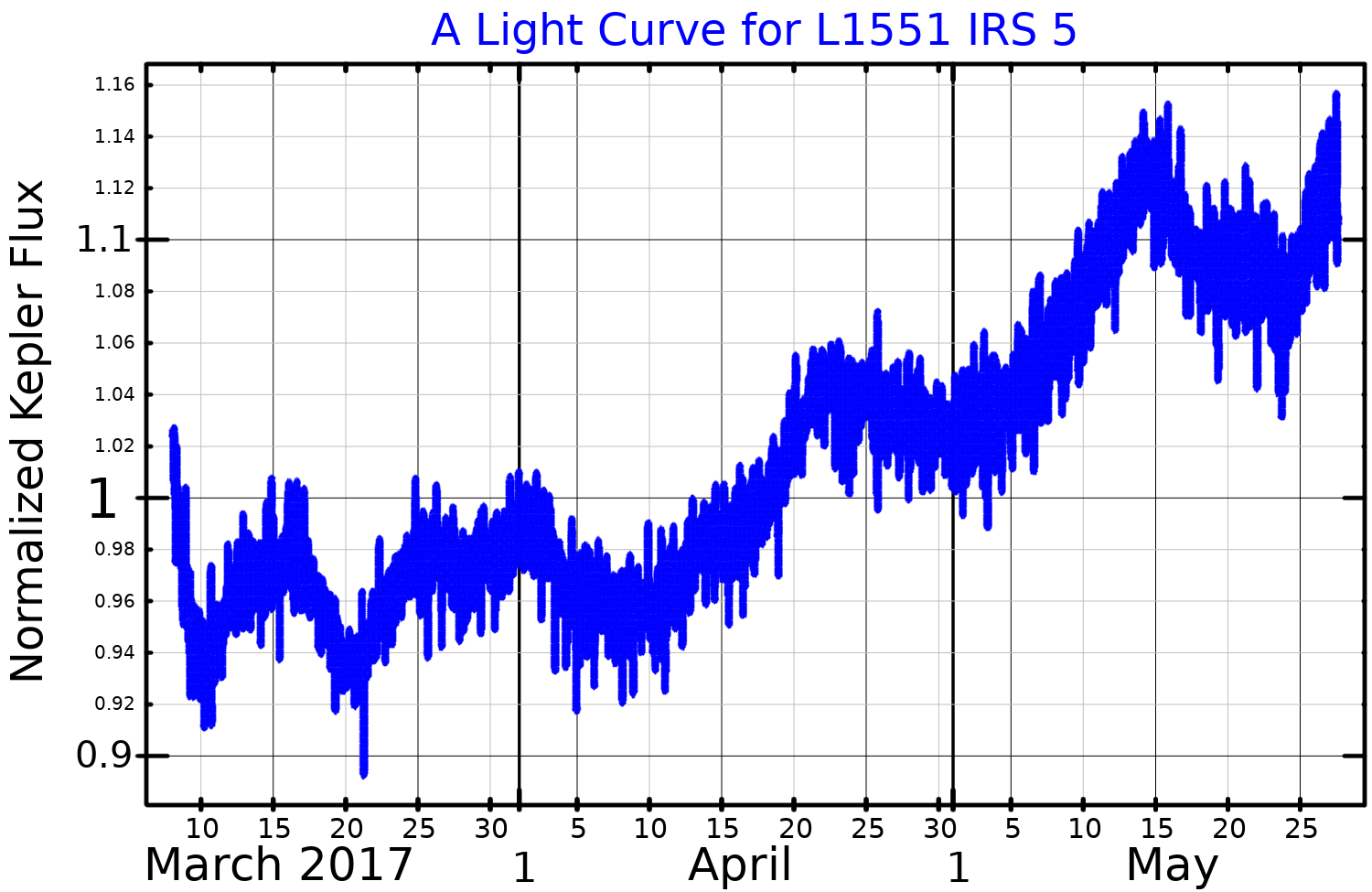
A Kepler light curve for L1551 IRS 5, adapted from Cody et al. (2022)

== Protoplanetary disk ==
The L1551 NE planetary system
Companion (in order from star)	Mass	Semimajor axis (AU)	Orbital period (days)	Eccentricity	Inclination	Radius
North protoplanetary disk	13.3±3.5 AU				35±14°	—
South protoplanetary disk	14.0±5.0 AU				45±15°	—
Circumbinary protoplanetary disk	141.9±7.4 AU				61.5±1.7°	—
