= Betsimisaraka =

Betsimisaraka ("the many inseparables" in the Betsimisaraka language) may refer to:

- Betsimisaraka people, a large ethnic group of Madagascar
- Betsimisaraka language, language of the Betsimisaraka people
- Betsimisaraka region, the region in Eastern Madagascar inhabited by the Betsimaraka
- Betsimisaraka (moth), a synonym of the snout moth genus Nhoabe
