= Antoine Laurain =

French writer (born 1972)

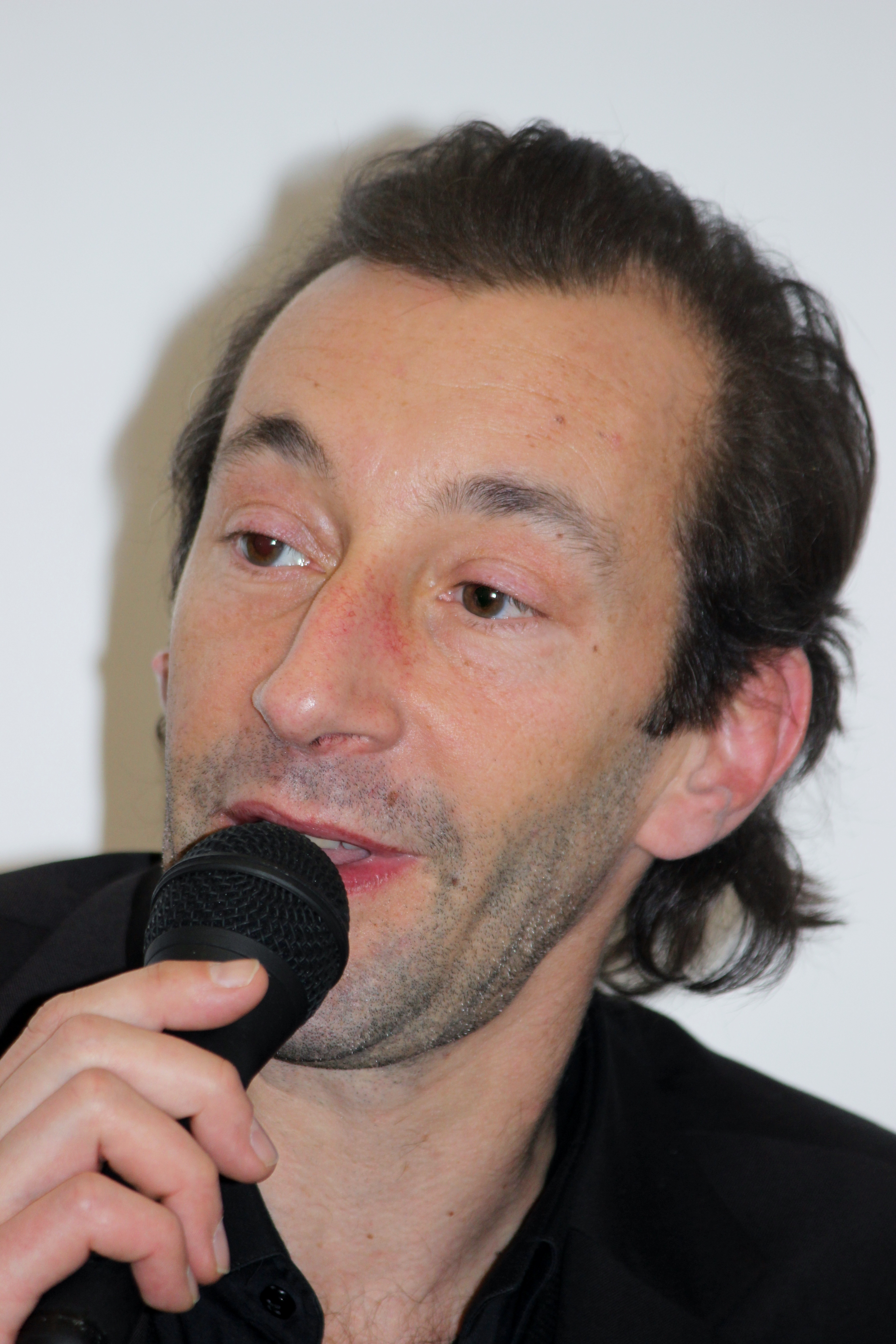
Laurain in 2018

Antoine Laurain (born 1972 in Paris) is a French writer.

His first novel, The Portrait [Ailleurs si j'y suis] won the Drouot Prize in 2007, and was followed by Smoking Kills [Fume et tue] (2008) and Carrefour des Nostalgies (2009). In 2012 The President’s Hat [Le Chapeau de Mitterrand] would be one of the year's great successes. The novel won the Landerneau prize for emerging writers and the Relay travel prize. Translated into 17 languages and published in English by Gallic Books, in 2013 it became one of the highest selling French books in translation. Antoine Laurain participated in a US tour for The President’s Hat at the invitation of American independent bookshops. The tour lasted 15 days, during which time he visited 10 cities.

In 2015 The President’s Hat was adapted for television (France 2) with Frédéric Diefenthal, Michel Leeb, Frédérique Bell and Roland Giraud (directed by Robin Davis, music by Vladimir Cosma).

The Red Notebook [La femme au carnet rouge] was published in 2014 and was translated into 22 languages, including under the German title of Liebe mit zwei Unbekannten (Hoffmann und Campe) and the Italian title of La donna dal taccuino rosso (Einaudi). The cinematic rights were sold to UGC.

In 2016, the German translation of The Red Notebook made the Spiegel bestseller list, and the German translation of The President’s Hat became the eighth-highest selling book in Germany that year. French Rhapsody [Rhapsodie française] was published the same year by Flammarion. Antoine Laurain returned to the US for the French Rhapsody tour, which consisted of six cities in nine days, and which confirmed the popularity of his books beyond the French borders.

On 11 April 2020, Camilla Parker Bowles, the Duchess of Cornwall published a list of nine books she recommended for reading during the COVID-19 lockdown on the Clarence House Instagram account. Only one French title appeared: The Red Notebook by Antoine Laurain.

Laurain's most recent novel, Les caprices d'un astre (2022) has been published in English as An Astronomer in Love.

== Selected works ==
- La femme au carnet rouge, translation: The Red Notebook, by Jane Aitken and Emily Boyce
- Le Chapeau de Mitterrand, translation: The President's Hat, by Louise Rogers Lalaurie, Jane Aitken and Emily Boyce
- Rhapsodie française, translation: French Rhapsody, by Jane Aitken and Emily Boyce
- Ailleurs si j'y suis, translation: The Portrait, by Jane Aitken and Emily Boyce
- Fume et tue, translation: Smoking Kills, by Louise Rogers Lalaurie
- Millésime 1954, translation: Vintage 1954, by Jane Aitken and Emily Boyce
- Le Service des manuscrits, translation: The Reader’s Room by Jane Aitken, Emily Boyce and Polly Mackintosh
- Et mon cœur se serra, in collaboration with Le Sonneur, translation: Red is My Heart by Jane Aitken
