= Iwamoto =

Iwamoto may refer to:

- Iwa Moto, Filipina actress and model
- Iwamoto (surname), a Japanese surname
- C/2018 Y1 (Iwamoto), a comet discovered by astronomer Masayuki Iwamoto
  - C/2018 V1 (Machholz–Fujikawa–Iwamoto), co-discovered by Masayuki Iwamoto
  - C/2020 A2 (Iwamoto), discovered by Masayuki Iwamoto
  - 4951 Iwamoto, a main-belt asteroid named after Masayuki Iwamoto
