= C/2018 Y1 (Iwamoto) =

Non-periodic comet

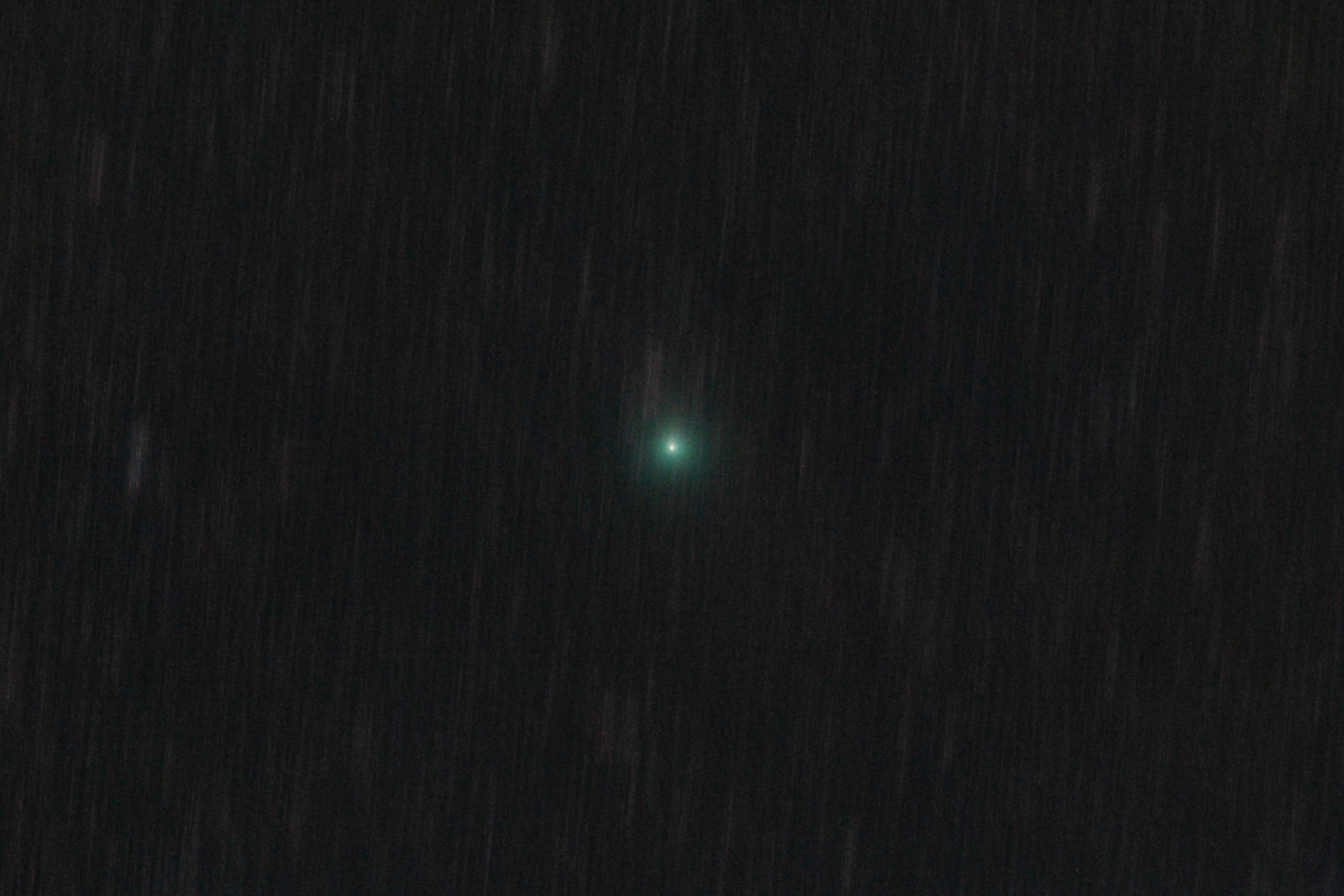
- Comet Iwamoto photographed by Brandon Ghany on 26 February 2019

Discovery
- Discovered by: Masayuki Iwamoto
- Discovery site: Awa, Tokushima, Japan
- Discovery date: 18 December 2018

Designations
- Alternative designations: CK18Y010

Orbital characteristics
- Epoch: 3 March 2019 (JD 2458545.5)
- Observation arc: 348 days
- Number of observations: 2,771
- Aphelion: 287.25 AU
- Perihelion: 1.287 AU
- Semi-major axis: 144.27 AU
- Eccentricity: 0.9911
- Orbital period: 1,733 years
- Inclination: 160.40°
- Longitude of ascending node: 147.48°
- Argument of periapsis: 358.06°
- Last perihelion: 7 February 2019
- T_{Jupiter}: –1.286
- Earth MOID: 0.299 AU
- Jupiter MOID: 1.507 AU

Physical characteristics
- Comet total magnitude (M1): 13.6
- Apparent magnitude: 5.5 (2019 apparition)

C/2018 Y1 (Iwamoto) is a non-periodic comet with a retrograde orbit discovered on 18 December 2018, by Japanese amateur astronomer Masayuki Iwamoto. Its orbital period is estimated to be 1,733 years, and it passed closest to Earth on 13 February 2019.

== Observational history ==
Nearly a month after co-discovering C/2018 V1 (Machholz–Fujikawa–Iwamoto), Masayuki Iwamoto spotted another comet on 18 December 2018, which was moving north on the constellation Hydra. (Note: Reported initial position upon discovery was: α = 14^{h} 17^{m} 45.33^{s}, δ = –24° 44′ 13.4″) Shuichi Nakano noted that the 13th-magnitude object has a blue coma, where he also provided initial orbital calculations using Iwamoto's images two days later.

It was expected to reach a magnitude of between 6.5 and 7.5, visible in binoculars or a small telescope. On 13 February 2019, Juan Jose Gonzalez reported that it had reached a peak magnitude of 5.5, before fading to 7.6 two weeks later.

== Physical characteristics ==
The comet was observed by iSHELL spectrograph at the NASA Infrared Telescope Facility (IRTF). Overall, the measured spatial distributions for polar molecules (in particular, H_{2}O and CH_{3}OH) were broader, exhibiting more complex structure compared with nonpolar or weakly polar species (CH_{4}, C_{2}H_{6}, and CO). Compositionally, compared to their respective mean abundances among comets from the Oort cloud, C_{2}H_{6} and CH_{3}OH were enriched, CH_{4} and HCN were near normal, and all other species were depleted. The abundance ratio CH_{3}OH/C_{2}H_{6} was higher by 45±8% on January 13 versus February 5, whereas CH_{4}/C_{2}H_{6} was unchanged within the uncertainty, suggesting nonhomogeneous composition among regions of the nucleus dominating activity on these dates.

== Orbit ==
Animation of C/2018 Y1 orbit around the Sun Mercury Venus · Earth · Mars · C/2018 Y1

Animation of C/2018 Y1 orbit 1600-2500 Sun · Uranus · C/2018 Y1

== Gallery ==
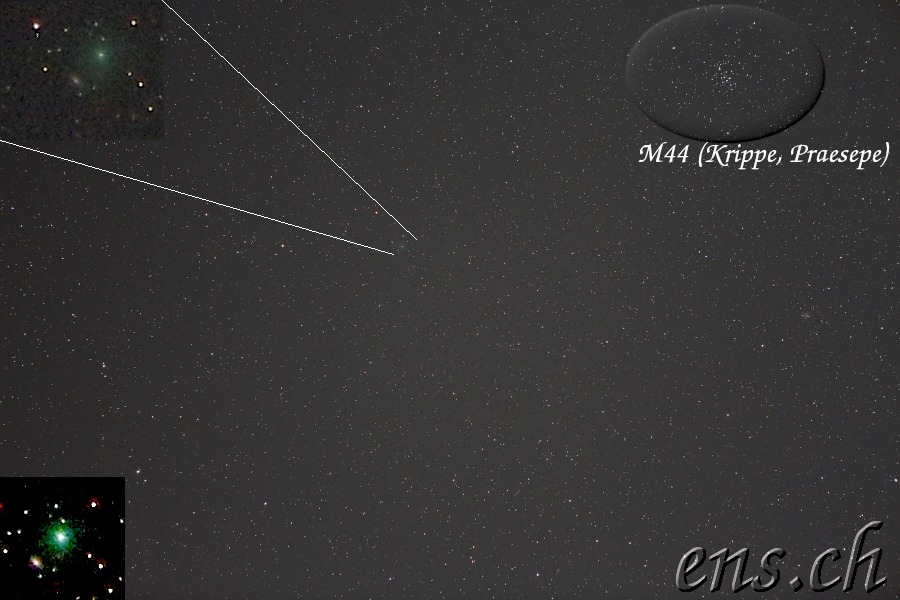
Comet C/2018 Y1 (Iwamoto) with M44, 13. February 2019, 23:04 Uhr

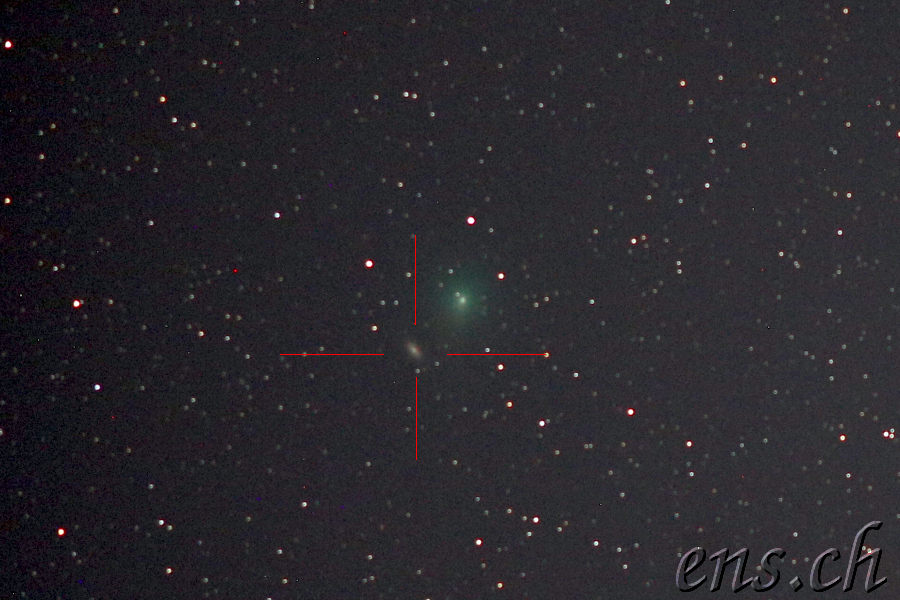
Comet C/2018 Y1 (Iwamoto) with the spiral galaxy NGC 2903, 13 February 2019, 23:19 Uhr

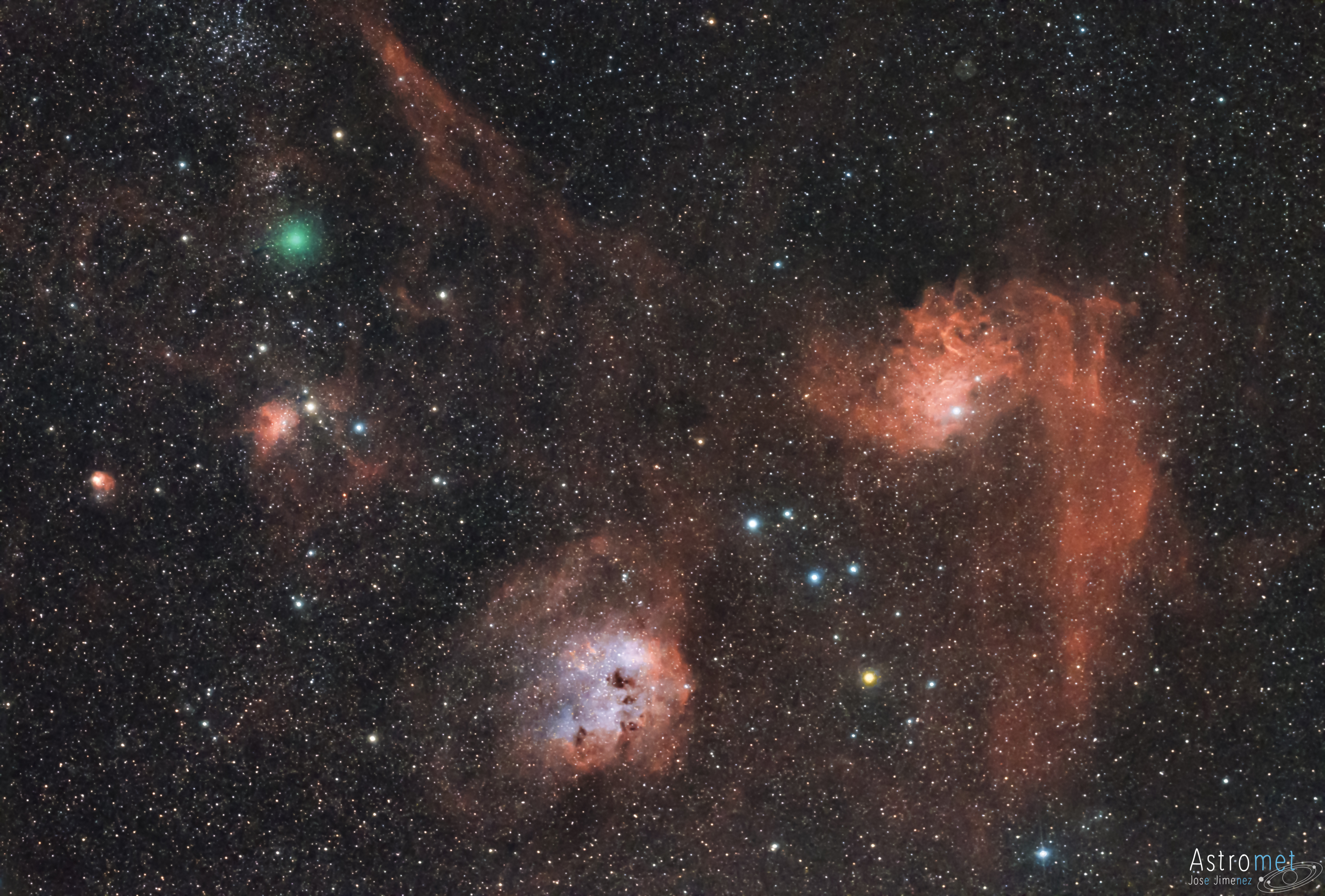
Comet C/2018 Y1 (Iwamoto) with nebulae IC 410 and IC 405

C/2018 Y1 (Iwamoto) as seen from the infrared telescope NEOWISE on 25 February 2019

== See also ==
- C/2018 V1 (Machholz–Fujikawa–Iwamoto)
- C/2020 A2 (Iwamoto)
