= C/2020 A2 (Iwamoto) =

Non-periodic comet

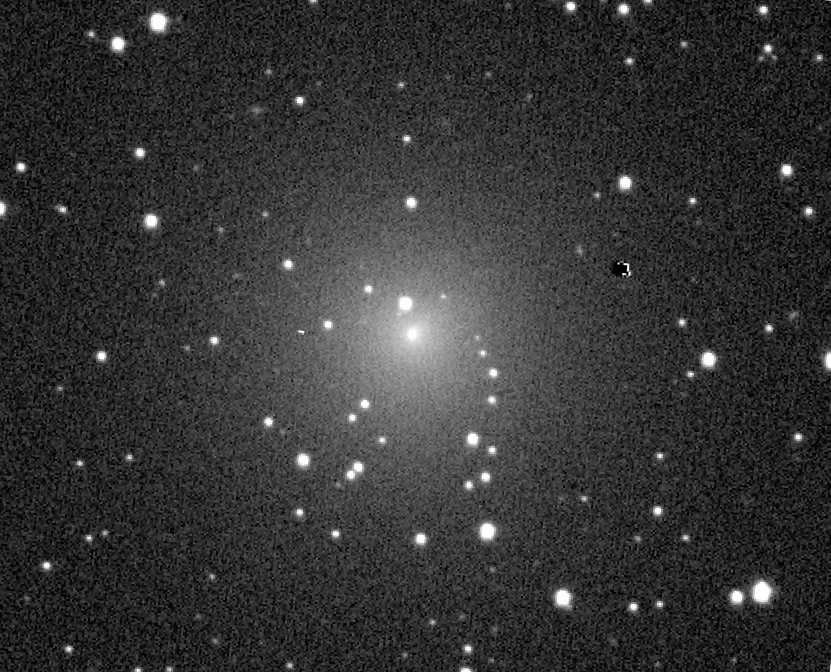
- Comet C/2020 A2 (Iwamoto) photographed from the Zwicky Transient Facility on 19 February 2020.

Discovery
- Discovered by: Masayuki Iwamoto
- Discovery site: Tokushima, Japan
- Discovery date: 8 January 2020

Designations
- Alternative designations: CK20A020, IF033

Orbital characteristics
- Epoch: 23 February 2020 (JD 2458902.5)
- Observation arc: 104 days
- Number of observations: 529
- Aphelion: ~2,120 AU
- Perihelion: 0.978 AU
- Semi-major axis: ~1,060 AU
- Eccentricity: 0.99908
- Orbital period: ~34,500 years
- Inclination: 120.75°
- Longitude of ascending node: 286.38°
- Argument of periapsis: 68.209°
- Mean anomaly: 0.0013°
- Last perihelion: 8 January 2020
- T_{Jupiter}: –0.622
- Earth MOID: 0.312 AU
- Jupiter MOID: 1.129 AU

Physical characteristics
- Comet total magnitude (M1): 15.1
- Comet nuclear magnitude (M2): 17.2
- Apparent magnitude: 9.6 (2020 apparition)

Comet Iwamoto, formally designated as C/2020 A2 is a faint non-periodic comet that was observed between January and April 2020. As of 2025, it is the fourth and most recent comet discovered by Japanese astronomer, Masayuki Iwamoto. (Note: This figure includes C/2018 V1 (Machholz–Fujikawa–Iwamoto), which Iwamoto had co-discovered with Donald Machholz and Shigehisa Fujikawa)

== Observational history ==
Masayuki Iwamoto reported a new 14th-magnitude object with cometary features on the night of 8 January 2020, which was moving gradually north within the constellation Ophiuchus. (Note: Reported initial position upon discovery was: α = 17^{h} 52^{m} 58.28^{s}, δ = 5° 44′ 30″) Nearly five days later, Gennadiy Borisov confirmed the existence of Iwamoto's new comet, reporting that it has a diffuse coma about 40 arcseconds in diameter. Additional observations from the Xingming Observatory, Magdalena Ridge Observatory, and other sites between 10 and 14 January 2020 reveal that the comet does not have a tail at the time.

== See also ==
- C/2018 Y1 (Iwamoto)
