= Nobuhisa =

- Gender: Male

Origin
- Origin: Japanese
- Meaning: Different meanings depending on the kanji used

Nobuhisa (written: 信久, 信尚, 信寿, 暢久, 修久 or 延尚) is a masculine Japanese given name. Notable people with the name include:

- Nobuhisa Kojima (小島 信久; born 1933), Japanese astronomer
- Takatsukasa Nobuhisa (鷹司 信尚; 1590–1621), Japanese kugyō
- Tsugaru Nobuhisa (津軽 信寿; 1669–1746), Japanese daimyō
- Nobuhisa Yamada (山田 暢久; born 1975), Japanese footballer
- Nobuhisa Urata (浦田 延尚; born 1989), Japanese footballer
