= C/2002 X5 (Kudo–Fujikawa) =

Non-periodic comet

Discovery
- Discovered by: Tetuo Kudo; Shigehisa Fujikawa
- Discovery site: Japan
- Discovery date: 13–14 December 2002

Designations
- Alternative designations: CK02X050

Orbital characteristics
- Epoch: 20 January 2003 (JD 2452659.5)
- Observation arc: 129 days
- Earliest precovery date: 6 November 2002
- Number of observations: 514
- Aphelion: ~2,390 AU
- Perihelion: 0.189 AU
- Semi-major axis: ~1,200 AU
- Eccentricity: 0.99984
- Orbital period: ~41,200 years
- Inclination: 94.152°
- Longitude of ascending node: 119.07°
- Argument of periapsis: 187.58°
- Mean anomaly: 359.99°
- Last perihelion: 29 January 2003
- T_{Jupiter}: –0.035
- Earth MOID: 0.741 AU
- Jupiter MOID: 1.343 AU

Physical characteristics
- Dimensions: 3.4–4.0 km (2.1–2.5 mi)
- Mean diameter: 2.2 km (1.4 mi)
- Mass: 2.3×10^{12} kg
- Comet total magnitude (M1): 10.6
- Comet nuclear magnitude (M2): 14.9
- Apparent magnitude: 4.2 (2003 apparition)

Comet Kudo–Fujikawa, formally designated as C/2002 X5, is a non-periodic comet that was visible through binoculars in January 2003. It was discovered by two Japanese astronomers, Tetuo Kudo and Shigehisa Fujikawa.

== Discovery and observations ==
Tetuo Kudo was the first person to spot the comet when he located it using a pair of 20x135 binoculars on 13 December 2002. The following day, Shigehisa Fujikawa made his independent discovery a day later, marking his sixth overall comet discovery since 1969. At the time of its discovery, the comet was a 9th-magnitude object within the constellation Böotes. Since then, Terry Lovejoy found precovery images that were taken by the SWAN instrument aboard the SOHO spacecraft between 6 and 13 November 2002.

Brian G. Marsden provided the first orbital calculations for the comet on 15 December 2002, where it was initially predicted to reach perihelion on 24 January 2003. Its perihelion date was later revised to 29 January. Between 25 January and 1 February 2003, the comet is within view of the LASCO C3 camera aboard the SOHO spacecraft, allowing measurements of its C_{2}/CN compound ratio emitted to be conducted.
