= 70P/Kojima =

Periodic comet

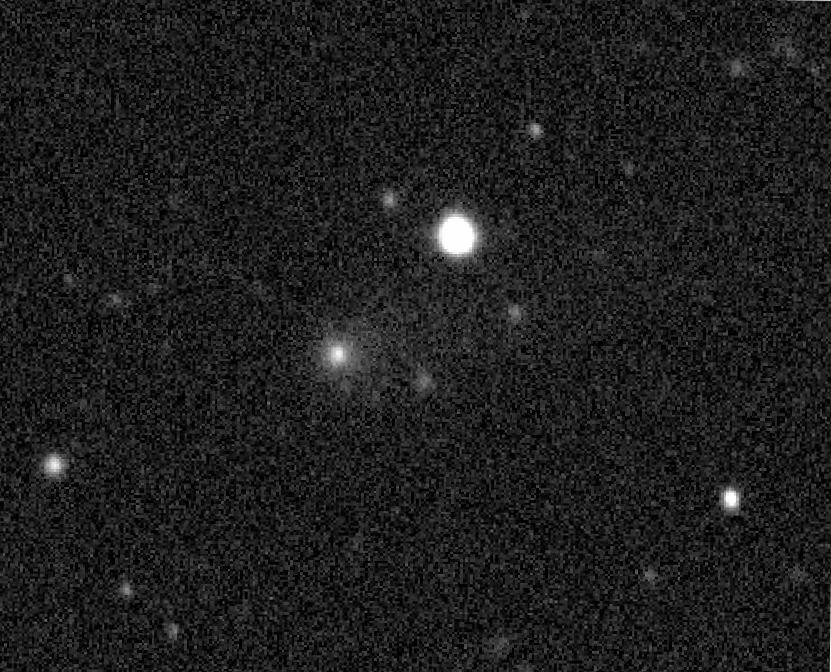
- 70P/Kojima as imaged from the Zwicky Transient Facility on 1 March 2022

Discovery
- Discovered by: Nobuhisa Kojima
- Discovery site: Ishiki, Aichi, Japan
- Discovery date: 27 December 1970

Designations
- MPC designation: P/1970 Y1, P/1977 X1; P/2025 MJ_{354}
- Alternative designations: 1970 XII, 1978 X; 1986 VII, 1994 VI; 1970r, 1977r, 1985o; 1992z

Orbital characteristics
- Epoch: 13 September 2023 (JD 2460200.5)
- Observation arc: 51.47 years
- Number of observations: 2,122
- Aphelion: 5.347 AU
- Perihelion: 2.007 AU
- Semi-major axis: 3.677 AU
- Eccentricity: 0.45411
- Orbital period: 7.050 years
- Inclination: 6.599°
- Longitude of ascending node: 119.25°
- Argument of periapsis: 1.780°
- Mean anomaly: 94.901°
- Last perihelion: 3 November 2021
- Next perihelion: 21 November 2028
- T_{Jupiter}: 2.904
- Earth MOID: 1.022 AU
- Jupiter MOID: 0.140 AU

Physical characteristics
- Mean diameter: 3.64 km (2.26 mi)
- Synodic rotation period: 22±5 hours
- Comet total magnitude (M1): 12.2
- Comet nuclear magnitude (M2): 15.0

70P/Kojima is a periodic comet in the Solar System with a current orbital period of 7.05 years. It is the first of two comets discovered by Japanese astronomer, Nobuhisa Kojima. (Note: Kojima later discovered C/1972 U1 (Kojima) a few years later)

== Observational history ==
It was discovered at Ishiki, Aichi, Japan by Nobuhisa Kojima, who estimated its brightness at magnitude 14. Its parabolic orbit was calculated by Kiichirō Furukawa to have a perihelion date of 1 November 1970. This was revised on the basis of further observations to an elliptical orbit with a perihelion of 7 October and an orbital period of 6.16.

Hiroki Kosai and Furukawa relocated the comet on 9 December 1977 at its next predicted apparition with the 105 cm (41 in) Schmidt telescope at the Kiso Station of the Tokyo Astronomical Observatory, estimating its brightness at magnitude 16. It was subsequently observed in 1985/1986 and 1992/1994 by Spacewatch with magnitudes of 20 and 22.1, respectively. The comet then passed close to Jupiter, which reduced the perihelion distance from 2.4 AU to 1.97 AU, increased the eccentricity from 0.39 to 0.46 and reduced the orbital period from 7.85 to 6.99 years.

== Physical characteristics ==
Its nucleus is estimated to have an effective radius of 1.82±0.09 kilometers and its rotational period is estimated to be 22±5 hours.

== See also ==
- List of numbered comets

== Notes ==
Numbered comets
Previous; 69P/Taylor	70P/Kojima	Next; 71P/Clark
