= 68P/Klemola =

Jupiter-family comet

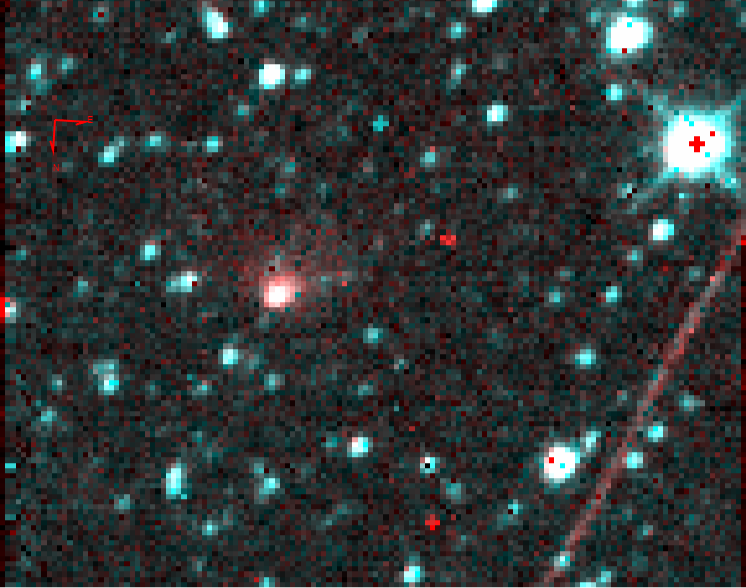
- Infrared image of Comet Klemola taken by NEOWISE on 23 August 2019

Discovery
- Discovered by: Arnold R. Klemola
- Discovery site: Yale-Columbia Southern Station, Argentina
- Discovery date: 28 October 1965

Designations
- MPC designation: P/1965 U1, P/1976 P1; P/2019 JP_{114}
- Alternative designations: 1965 VI, 1976 X; 1987 XIV, 1965j, 1976j; 1987i

Orbital characteristics
- Epoch: 21 November 2025 (JD 2461000.5)
- Observation arc: 55.19 years
- Number of observations: 1,978
- Aphelion: 8.119 AU
- Perihelion: 1.809 AU
- Semi-major axis: 4.964 AU
- Eccentricity: 0.63563
- Orbital period: 11.06 years
- Inclination: 11.097°
- Longitude of ascending node: 175.09°
- Argument of periapsis: 153.20°
- Mean anomaly: 196.75°
- Last perihelion: 9 November 2019
- Next perihelion: 4 November 2030
- T_{Jupiter}: 2.524
- Earth MOID: 0.758 AU
- Jupiter MOID: 0.174 AU

Physical characteristics
- Mean radius: 2.5 km (1.6 mi)
- Mean density: 450±80 kg/m^{3}
- Comet total magnitude (M1): 11.2
- Comet nuclear magnitude (M2): 14.1

68P/Klemola or Klemola's Comet is a Jupiter-family comet that was discovered in 1965 by American astronomer Arnold Richard Klemola in Argentinian Yale-Columbia Southern Station.

== Observational history ==
It was observed at the next predicted apparition by Gérard Sause at the Observatoire de Haute Provence, France on 6 August 1976 with a brightness of magnitude 12. It was successfully observed in 1987 when J. Gibson of the Palomar Observatory, California, obtained images with the 1.5-meter reflector on 16 February. It appeared essentially stellar, with a faint magnitude of 19. It was observed again on 29 March 1997 by Carl W. Hergenrother at the F. L. Whipple Observatory, with perihelion on 1 May 1998.

68P came to opposition on 14 June 2019 and perihelion on 9 November 2019. During this apparition, the comet exhibited intermediate level of activity relative to other known Jupiter-family comets like 78P/Gehrels.

== Orbit ==
Orbital reconstruction of the comet in 2024 revealed that 68P/Klemola entered the JFC region only a thousand years ago, and is still a relatively young comet as a result.

Numbered comets
Previous; 67P/Churyumov–Gerasimenko	68P/Klemola	Next; 69P/Taylor
