= 71P/Clark =

Jupiter-family comet

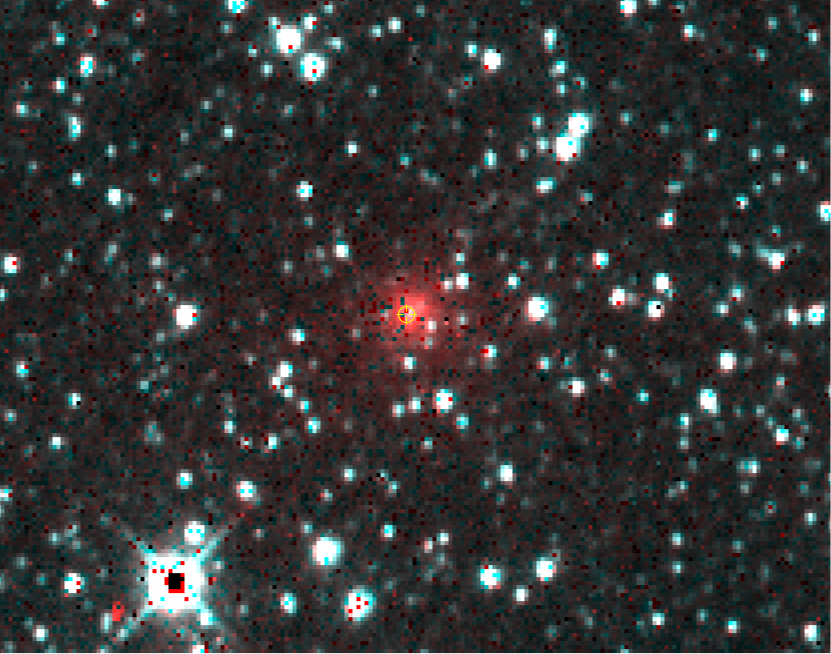
- Infrared image of Comet Clark taken by NEOWISE on 9 September 2017

Discovery
- Discovered by: Michael Clark
- Discovery date: 9 June 1973

Designations
- MPC designation: P/1973 L1, P/1978 G1
- Alternative designations: 1973 V, 1978 XXIII; 1984 VIII, 1989 XX; 1973i, 1978g, 1983w; 1989h, 1994t

Orbital characteristics
- Epoch: March 6, 2006
- Aphelion: 4.685 AU
- Perihelion: 1.562 AU
- Semi-major axis: 3.124 AU
- Eccentricity: 0.4999
- Orbital period: 5.521 a
- Inclination: 9.4883°
- Last perihelion: 21 January 2023
- Next perihelion: 28 September 2028

Physical characteristics
- Mean radius: 0.83 km (0.52 mi)
- Mean density: 460±70 kg/m^{3}
- Geometric albedo: 0.035 (assumed)
- Spectral type: (V–R) = 0.64±0.07
- Comet total magnitude (M1): 11.1
- Comet nuclear magnitude (M2): 14.6

71P/Clark is a periodic comet in the Solar System with an orbital period of 5.5 years.

It was discovered by Michael Clark at Mount John University Observatory, New Zealand on 9 June 1973 with a brightness of apparent magnitude 13. Subsequently it has been observed in 1978, 1984, 1989, 1995, 2000, 2006, 2011 and 2017.

== Physical characteristics ==
The nucleus of the comet has a radius of 0.68 ± 0.04 km (0.423 ± 0.025 mi), assuming a geometric albedo of 0.04, based on observations by Hubble Space Telescope, while observations by Keck indicate a radius of 1.305 km (0.811 mi). Another study in 2006 places the nuclear radius around 0.83 km (0.52 mi) assuming that it has a geometric albedo of 0.035±0.012.

Numbered comets
Previous; 70P/Kojima	71P/Clark	Next; 72P/Denning–Fujikawa
