= NGC 1893 =

Open cluster in the constellation Auriga

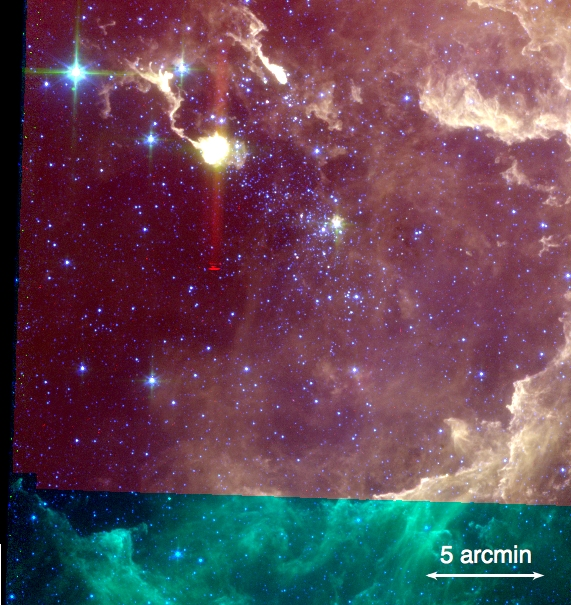
- Star Cluster NGC 1893 imbedded in the emission nebula IC 410.

Observation data (J2000 epoch)
- Right ascension: 05^{h} 22^{m} 44.(0)^{s}
- Declination: +33° 24′ 4(2)″
- Distance: 3,790 pc (12,400 ly)
- Apparent magnitude (V): 7.5
- Apparent dimensions (V): 11.0′

Physical characteristics
- Estimated age: 4 Myr
- Other designations: Cr 63, Mel 33, C0519+333, Lund 166, OCL 439, OCISM 101, Raab 24, Sh 2-236

Associations
- Constellation: Auriga

NGC 1893 is an open cluster in the constellation Auriga. It is about 12,400 light years away. The star cluster is embedded in the Emission nebula IC 410 (also known as the Tadpole Nebula).

Images of the star cluster by the Chandra X-ray Observatory suggest that it contains approximately 4,600 young stellar objects.

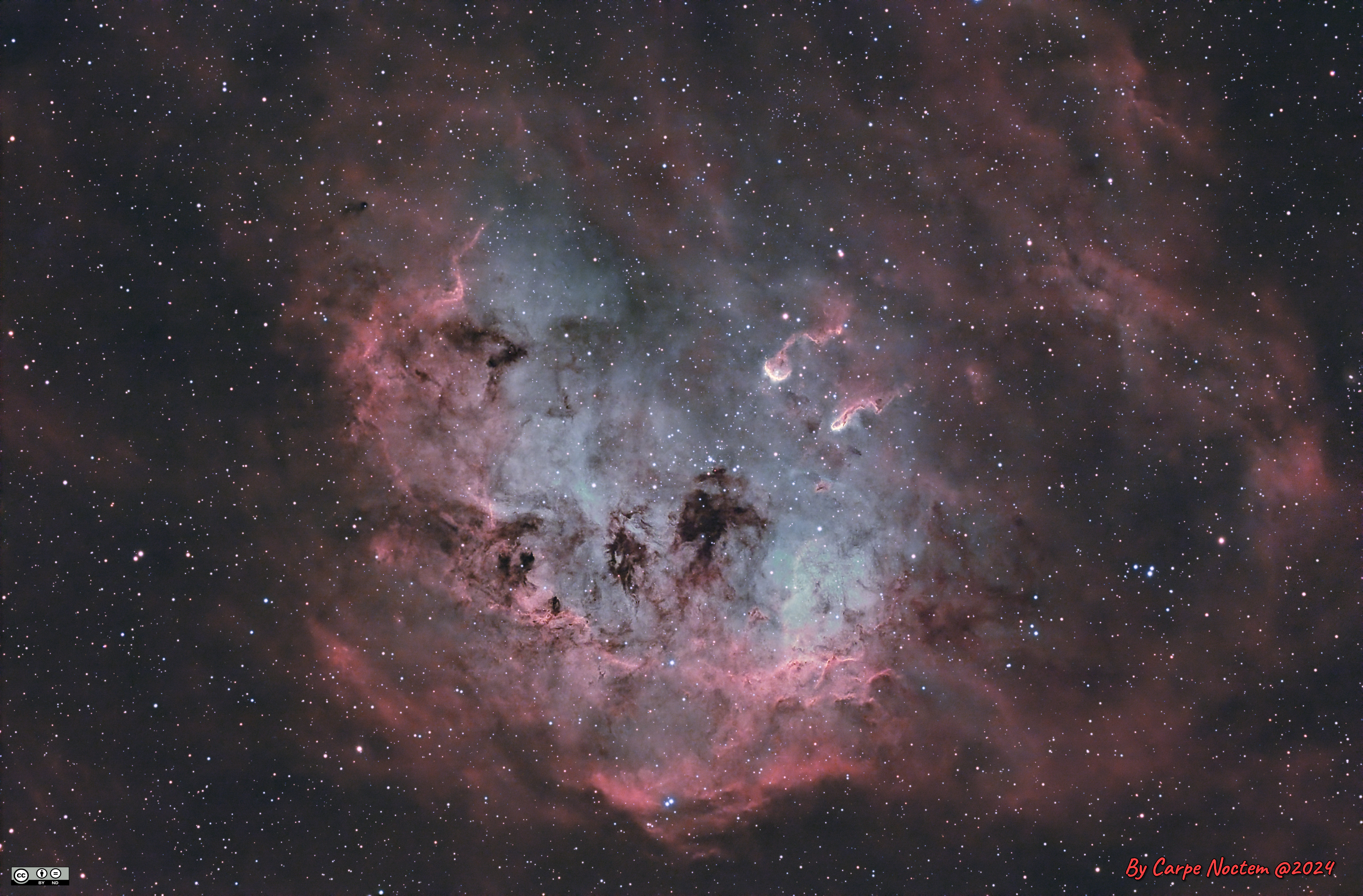
Image of the entire Tadpole Nebula (IC 410)
