= 69P/Taylor =

Jupiter-family comet

Discovery
- Discovered by: Clement J. Taylor
- Discovery site: Cape Town, South Africa
- Discovery date: 24 November 1915

Designations
- MPC designation: D/1915 W1; P/1976 X1
- Alternative designations: 1916 I, 1977 II; 1990 XXX; 1915e, 1977a, 1990n

Orbital characteristics
- Epoch: 21 November 2025 (JD 2461000.5)
- Observation arc: 103.28 years
- Number of observations: 854
- Aphelion: 5.489 AU
- Perihelion: 2.271 AU
- Semi-major axis: 3.879 AU
- Eccentricity: 0.41469
- Orbital period: 7.641 years
- Inclination: 22.061°
- Longitude of ascending node: 104.81°
- Argument of periapsis: 343.53°
- Mean anomaly: 314.03°
- Last perihelion: 18 March 2019
- Next perihelion: 12 November 2026
- T_{Jupiter}: 2.797
- Earth MOID: 1.306 AU
- Jupiter MOID: 0.134 AU

Physical characteristics
- Mean radius: 0.83 km (0.52 mi)
- Mean density: 560±80 kg/m^{3}
- Comet total magnitude (M1): 17.3

Comet Taylor, also known as 69P/Taylor, is a Jupiter-family comet with a 7.64-year orbit around the Sun. It is the only comet discovered by South African astronomer, Clement Jennings Taylor. It will next come to perihelion on 12 November 2026, but will only brighten to about magnitude 17–21.

== Observational history ==
=== Discovery ===
The comet was first discovered by Clement J. Taylor from Cape Town, South Africa on 24 November 1915. It was first recognized as a periodic comet after Hamilton Jeffers and Ferdinand J. Neubauer calculated its orbit in February 1916. Around the same time, George van Biesbroeck and Edward Emerson Barnard observed the comet from the Yerkes Observatory, and reported that the comet split into two distinct nuclei, A and B. Barnard initially identified the brighter Fragment A as the main component of Comet Taylor, however he later determined that it was Fragment B the actual main body instead, after orbital calculations of the latter fragment matched that of the pre-breakup nucleus, indicating that Fragment A was undergoing an outburst at the time. The comet was last seen in May 1917.

=== Loss and recovery ===
The comet was predicted to return in 1922, but was not recovered. After a close encounter with Jupiter in 1925, of which the comet approached the planet at a distance of 0.24 AU (36 million km), the comet was declared lost.

In 1928, the discovery of 30P/Reinmuth was originally assumed to be Comet Taylor, and again in 1951 the same assumption was made with 49P/Arend-Rigaux.

The 1976 return was predicted by N. A. Belyaev and V. V. Emelʹyanenko and on 25 January 1977, Charles Kowal announced that he recovered the comet on photographic plates taken from the Palomar Observatory on 13 December 1976.

=== Follow-up observations ===
The comet was recovered for the returns in 1984 and 1990, and in January 1998 was observed as magnitude 12 when it was 1.0 AU (150 million km) from Earth.

There were 6 recovery images of 69P in October 2018 when the comet had a magnitude of about 20.5. Due to the lack of observations, when the comet was at perihelion on 18 March 2019 and 2.45 AU (367 million km) from Earth, the 3-sigma uncertainty in the comet's Earth distance was ±6000 km.

== Physical characteristics ==
Between 2006 and 2007, infrared observations from the Spitzer Space Telescope revealed that the nucleus of 69P/Taylor has an effective radius of around 0.83 km (0.52 mi).

Numbered comets
Previous; 68P/Klemola	69P/Taylor	Next; 70P/Kojima
