= Matsuo Sugano =

Japanese astronomer

Asteroids discovered: 4
5881 Akashi^{[1]}	September 27, 1992
6559 Nomura^{[2]}	May 3, 1991
14873 Shoyo^{[2]}	October 28, 1990
8892 Kakogawa^{[2]}	September 11, 1994
1. ^{1} with K. Kawanishi; 2. ^{2} with T. Nomura

Matsuo Sugano (Japanese: 菅野 松男, Hepburn: Sugano Matsuo, born 1939) is a Japanese astronomer.

He has discovered a number of asteroids, including 5881 Akashi (with T. Nomura), 6559 Nomura (with K. Kawanishi), and 8892 Kakogawa (with T. Nomura). He was also a co-discoverer of Comet Sugano-Saigusa-Fujikawa (C/1983 J1).

The asteroid 5872 Sugano is named after him. Asteroid 6155 Yokosugano was named for his wife, Yoko.

A long-time employee of Akashi Municipal Planetarium in Akashi, Hyōgo, Sugano worked to develop amateur astronomy in Japan.
