= AE Aurigae =

Star in the constellation Auriga

- Location of AE Aur (circled)

Observation data Epoch J2000 Equinox ICRS
- Constellation: Auriga
- Right ascension: 05^{h} 16^{m} 18.14933^{s}
- Declination: +34° 18′ 44.3444″
- Apparent magnitude (V): 5.96 (5.78 - 6.08)

Characteristics
- Spectral type: O9.5V
- U−B color index: −0.70
- B−V color index: +0.22
- Variable type: Orion variable

Astrometry
Radial velocity (R_{v})	56.70±0.6 km/s
Proper motion (μ)	RA: −4.747 mas/yr Dec.: +43.538 mas/yr
Parallax (π)	2.5740±0.0340 mas
Distance	1,270 ± 20 ly (389 ± 5 pc)
Absolute magnitude (M_{V})	−3.93

Details
Mass	19.2±0.3 M_{☉}
Radius	6.8±0.5 R_{☉}
Luminosity	50,100+4,800 −4,400 L_{☉}
Surface gravity (log g)	4.06±0.05 cgs
Temperature	33,200±300 K
Rotational velocity (v sin i)	9±2 km/s
Age	3.98+0.81 −0.70 Myr

Other designations
- AG+34°542, BD+34°980, GC 6429, HD 34078, HIP 24575, HR 1712, SAO 57816, ADS 3843, CCDM J05163+3419, WDS J05163+3419, GCRV 3123, IRAS 05130+3415

Database references
SIMBAD	data

AE Aurigae (abbreviated as AE Aur) is a runaway star in the constellation Auriga; it lights the Flaming Star Nebula.

== Description ==
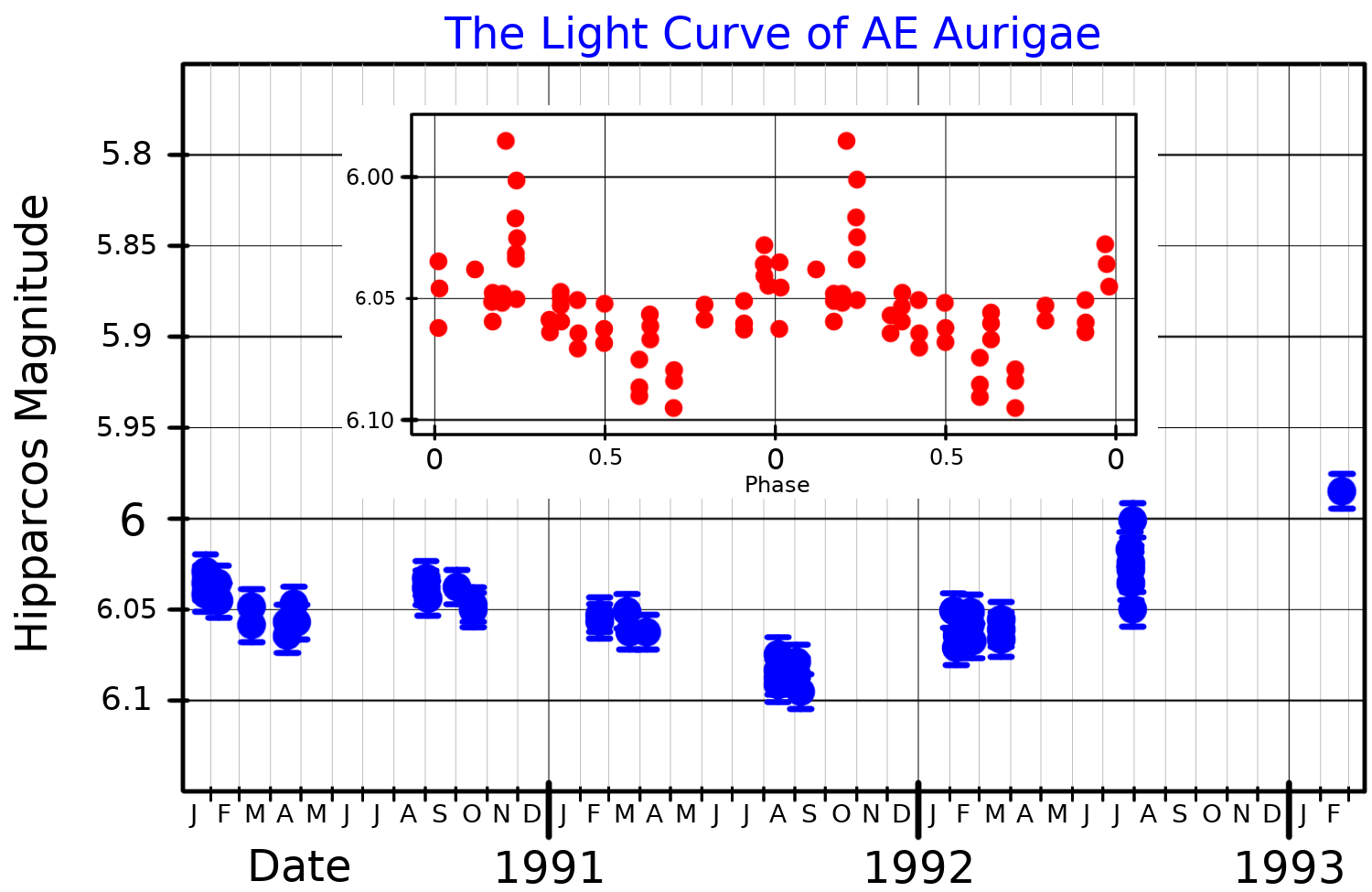
Hipparcos light curves for AE Aurigae. The main plot shows the long-term variation, and the inset plot shows the variation folded over a period of 213.7 days. Adapted from Marchenko et al. (1998)

AE Aurigae is a blue O-type main sequence star with a mean apparent magnitude of +6.0, making it faintly visible to the naked eye under very good observing conditions. It was discovered to be a variable star by Daniel Walter Morehouse, in 1923, and received its variable star designation in 1924. It is classified as an Orion type variable star and its brightness varies irregularly between magnitudes +5.78 and +6.08. It is approximately 1,300 light-years from Earth.

It is a runaway star that might have been ejected during a collision of two binary star groups. This collision, which also is credited with ejecting Mu Columbae and possibly 53 Arietis, has been traced to the Trapezium cluster in the Orion Nebula two million years ago. The binary Iota Orionis may have been the other half of this collision.

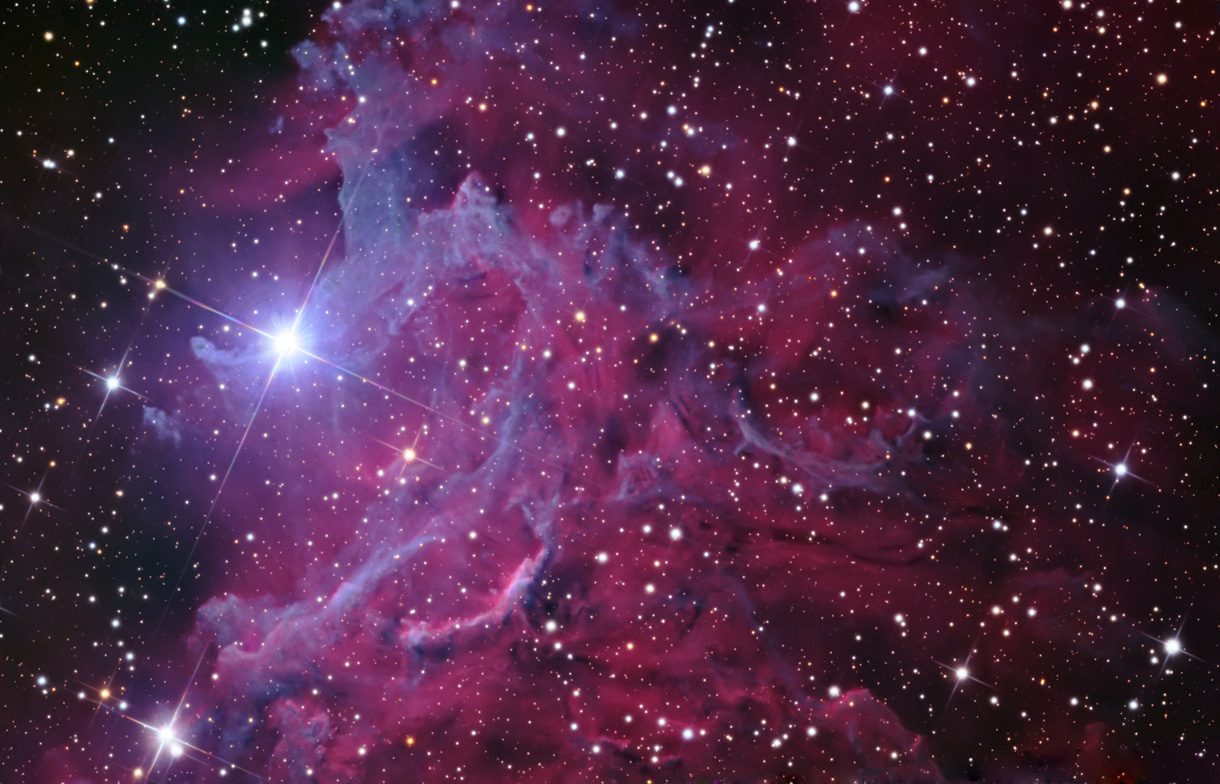
Nebula IC 405 around AE Aurigae

AE Aur is seen to light up the Flaming Star nebula, but it was not formed within it. Instead it is passing through the nebula at high speed and producing a violent bow shock and high energy electromagnetic radiation.

== Companions ==
Two candidate companion stars have been detected at angular distances of 8.4″ and 0.35″, respectively, but these are thought to be unrelated, optical companions. A new potential companion was discovered using the CHARA array in 2023. In December 2017, it had an angular separation from AE Aurigae of 6.85 mas, and in September 2018 it had an angular separation of 1.74 mas.
