= Iwamoto (surname) =

Iwamoto (written: 岩本 or 岩元) is a Japanese surname. Notable people with the surname include:

- Aileen Iwamoto or Iwa Moto, Japanese-Filipina actress and model
- Akiko Iwamoto (岩本 亜希子; born 1978), Japanese rower
- Kaoru Iwamoto (岩本 薫; born 1902), Japanese professional Go player and teacher
- Kazuyuki Iwamoto (岩本 和行; born 1946), Japanese swimmer
- Kim Coco Iwamoto, Japanese–American politician
- Koji Iwamoto (岩本 煌史; born 1990), Japanese professional wrestler
- Koji Iwamoto (ice hockey) (岩本 宏二; born 1942), Japanese ice hockey player
- Masayuki Iwamoto (岩本 雅之; born 1954), Japanese astronomer
- Shohei Iwamoto (岩元 勝平; born 1989), Japanese modern pentathlete
- Takeshi Iwamoto (岩本 武志; born 1949), Japanese ice hockey player
