= 4797 Ako =

Stony main-belt asteroid

Discovery
- Discovered by: T. Nomura; K. Kawanishi
- Discovery site: Minami-Oda Obs. (374)
- Discovery date: 30 September 1989

Designations
- Named after: Akō, Hyōgo (Japanese city)
- Alternative designations: 1989 SJ · 1978 VY_{9} 1985 QB_{4}
- Minor planet category: main-belt · Nysa–Polana complex

Orbital characteristics
- Epoch 4 September 2017 (JD 2458000.5)
- Uncertainty parameter 0
- Observation arc: 38.49 yr (14,057 days)
- Aphelion: 2.8553 AU
- Perihelion: 1.9714 AU
- Semi-major axis: 2.4133 AU
- Eccentricity: 0.1831
- Orbital period (sidereal): 3.75 yr (1,369 days)
- Mean anomaly: 146.42°
- Mean motion: 0° 15^{m} 46.44^{s} / day
- Inclination: 1.8108°
- Longitude of ascending node: 320.82°
- Argument of perihelion: 78.111°

Physical characteristics
- Dimensions: 4.00 km (calculated); 6.000±0.496 km
- Synodic rotation period: 4.085±0.001 h
- Geometric albedo: 0.112±0.021; 0.21 (assumed)
- Spectral type: S
- Absolute magnitude (H): 14.1 · 14.3 · 14.31±0.27

4797 Ako, provisional designation 1989 SJ, is a stony asteroid from the inner regions of the asteroid belt, approximately 5 kilometers in diameter. It was discovered on 30 September 1989, by the Japanese astronomers Toshiro Nomura and Kōyō Kawanishi at the Minami-Oda Observatory (374), Japan. The asteroid was named for the Japanese city of Akō.

== Orbit and classification ==
Ako is a member of the stony subgroup of the Nysa–Polana complex, a collection of overlapping asteroid families. It orbits the Sun in the inner main-belt at a distance of 2.0–2.9 AU once every 3 years and 9 months (1,369 days). Its orbit has an eccentricity of 0.18 and an inclination of 2° with respect to the ecliptic.

In 1978, it was first identified as 1978 VY_{9} at Palomar Observatory, extending the body's observation arc by 11 years prior to its official discovery observation at Minami-Oda Observatory.

== Physical characteristics ==
=== Rotation period ===
A rotational lightcurve of Ako was obtained for the first time from photometric observations made at the U.S. Ricky Observatory, Missouri, in November 2008. It gave a well-defined rotation period of 4.085±0.001 hours with a relatively high brightness variation of 0.90 in magnitude (U=3), indicative of a non-spheroidal shape.

=== Diameter and albedo ===
According to NASA's space-based Wide-field Infrared Survey Explorer with its subsequent NEOWISE mission, Ako measures 6.0 kilometers in diameter and its surface has an albedo of 0.11, while the Collaborative Asteroid Lightcurve Link (CALL) assumes a standard albedo for stony asteroids of 0.21, and calculates a diameter of 4.0 kilometers, as the higher the albedo (reflectivity), the smaller a body's diameter for a certain absolute magnitude (brightness).

== Naming ==
This minor planet was named for the city of Akō in the Hyōgo Prefecture, Japan, and for its ancient castle on the Seto Inland Sea.

Known for its salt production, Ako is the birthplace of the fictional account of Chūshingura, a tale about the forty-seven Ronin who committed seppuku after avenging their master. The city is also the home of the second discoverer's private Minami-Oda observatory, where Kōyō Kawanishi observes small Solar System bodies. The official naming citation was published by the Minor Planet Center on 27 June 1991 (M.P.C. 18465).
