= Kōyō Kawanishi =

Japanese dentist and amateur astronomer

Minor planets discovered: 13
4106 Nada^{[1]}	March 6, 1989
4797 Ako^{[1]}	September 30, 1989
5401 Minamioda^{[1]}	March 6, 1989
5685 Sanenobufukui^{[1]}	December 8, 1990
5737 Itoh^{[1]}	September 30, 1989
5872 Sugano^{[1]}	September 30, 1989
6155 Yokosugano^{[1]}	November 11, 1990
6557 Yokonomura^{[1]}	November 11, 1990
6559 Nomura^{[2]}	May 3, 1991
7178 Ikuookamoto^{[1]}	November 11, 1990
9580 Tarumi^{[1]}	October 4, 1989
10318 Sumaura^{[1]}	October 15, 1990
14873 Shoyo^{[2]}	October 28, 1990
^{1} co-discovered with T. Nomura; ^{2} co-discovered with M. Sugano

Kōyō Kawanishi (川西 浩陽, Kawanishi Kōyō; born January 18, 1959) is a Japanese dentist, amateur astronomer and discoverer of 13 minor planets.

He lives in the city of Akō in the Hyōgo Prefecture, Japan, where his private Minami-Oda Observatory (374) is located. At the observatory, he observes comets and minor planets using his home-made 0.20-m reflector telescope together with his wife Kumi and daughter Saki. Familiar with electronics and mechanics, he has also developed his own CCD instrumentation.

The asteroid 5591 Koyo, discovered by Japanese astronomer Takeshi Urata, was named in his honour.
