= Toshiro Nomura =

Japanese astronomer

Toshiro Nomura (野村 敏郎, Nomura Toshirō; born 1954) is a Japanese astronomer and co-discoverer of 13 asteroids with astronomers Kōyō Kawanishi and Matsuo Sugano.

He is also an earth-science teacher of Nada Junior and High School. The main-belt asteroid 6559 Nomura is named in his honor.

Minor planets discovered: 13
4106 Nada	March 6, 1989	^{[1]}
4797 Ako	September 30, 1989	^{[1]}
5401 Minamioda	March 6, 1989	^{[1]}
5685 Sanenobufukui	December 8, 1990	^{[1]}
5737 Itoh	September 30, 1989	^{[1]}
5872 Sugano	September 30, 1989	^{[1]}
5881 Akashi	September 27, 1992	^{[2]}
6155 Yokosugano	November 11, 1990	^{[1]}
6557 Yokonomura	November 11, 1990	^{[1]}
7178 Ikuookamoto	November 11, 1990	^{[1]}
8892 Kakogawa	September 11, 1994	^{[2]}
9580 Tarumi	October 4, 1989	^{[1]}
10318 Sumaura	October 15, 1990	^{[1]}
1. ^{1} with K. Kawanishi; 2. ^{2} with M. Sugano
