= C/2018 V1 (Machholz–Fujikawa–Iwamoto) =

Hyperbolic comet

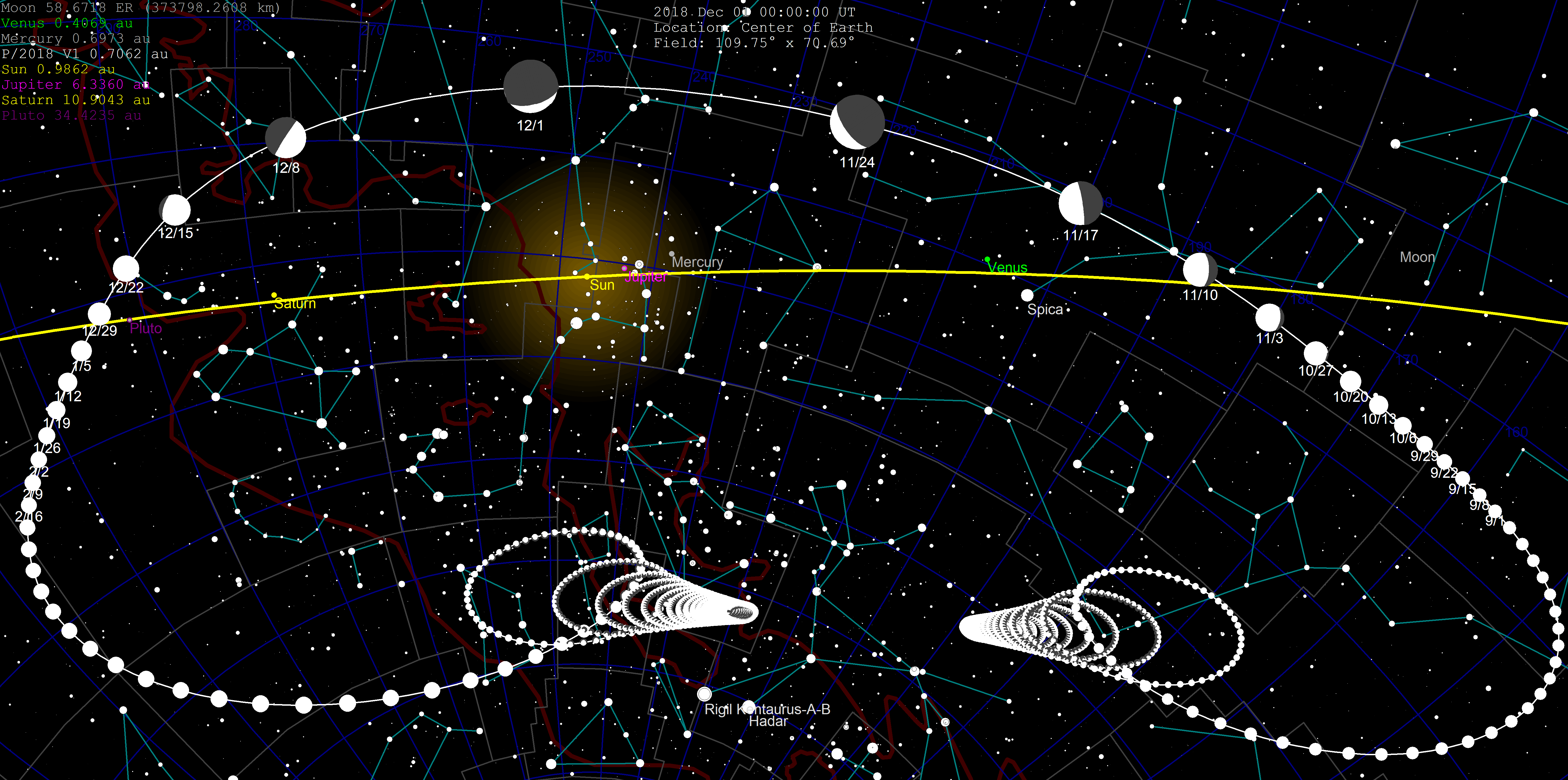
- Path of the comet C/2018 V1 across the sky, with a 7-day motion shown

Discovery
- Discovered by: Donald Machholz; Shigehisa Fujikawa; Masayuki Iwamoto
- Discovery site: Colfax, California; Japan
- Discovery date: 7 November 2018

Orbital characteristics
- Epoch: 16 November 2018 (JD 2458438.5)
- Observation arc: 37 days
- Number of observations: 750
- Perihelion: 0.387 AU
- Eccentricity: 1.00039
- Inclination: 143.988°
- Longitude of ascending node: 128.722°
- Argument of periapsis: 88.775°
- Last perihelion: 3 December 2018
- T_{Jupiter}: –0.624
- Earth MOID: 0.115 AU
- Jupiter MOID: 2.567 AU

Physical characteristics
- Comet total magnitude (M1): 12.8
- Comet nuclear magnitude (M2): 17.1
- Apparent magnitude: 7.5 (2018 apparition)

C/2018 V1 (Machholz–Fujikawa–Iwamoto) is a comet that follows a slightly hyperbolic trajectory. It was visually discovered on 7 November 2018 by Donald Machholz using an 18.5-inch reflecting telescope, and was independently co-discovered by Shigehisa Fujikawa and Masayuki Iwamoto. It reached perihelion on 3 December 2018.

== Overview ==
It was estimated to be between 8 and 10th magnitude from mid-November to mid-December 2018, visible in a small telescope. It was discovered by three amateur astronomers: by an observer in Colfax, California, USA and by two observers in Japan. The observations by three astronomers result in the name for the comet, Machholz-Fujikawa-Iwamoto. The current orbit determination of this comet is based on 750 observations with a 37-day observation arc.

Comet C/2018 V1 has a significant probability (72.6%) of having an extrasolar provenance although an origin in the Oort Cloud cannot be excluded. As the present-day value of its barycentric orbital eccentricity is greater than 1, this comet is currently escaping from the Solar System, aiming for interstellar space.

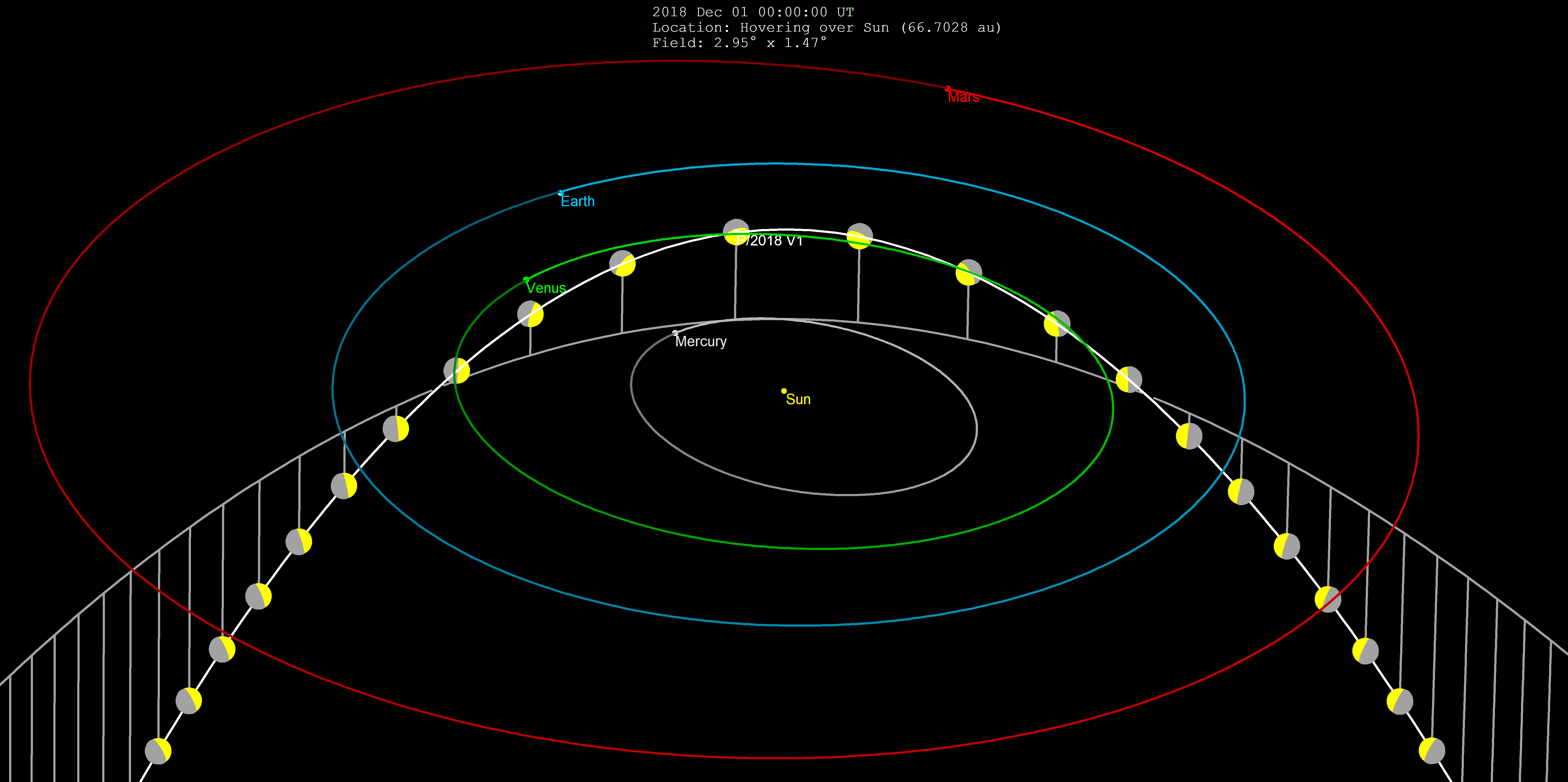
Perihelion in early December 2018, above the orbit of Mercury

Animation of C/2018 V1's orbit
Sun · Mercury · Venus · Earth · Mars · C/2018 V1

== See also ==
- List of parabolic comets
- 72P/Denning–Fujikawa
- C/1983 J1 (Sugano–Saigusa–Fujikawa)
