= C/1983 J1 (Sugano–Saigusa–Fujikawa) =

Non-periodic comet

Discovery
- Discovered by: Matsuo Sugano; Yoshikazu Saigusa; Shigehisa Fujikawa
- Discovery date: 8 May 1983

Designations
- Alternative designations: 1983e, 1983V

Orbital characteristics
- Epoch: 15 May 1983 (JD 2445469.5)
- Observation arc: 39 days
- Number of observations: 55
- Aphelion: 9,600 AU
- Perihelion: 0.471 AU
- Semi-major axis: 4,800 AU
- Eccentricity: 0.9999
- Orbital period: 330,000 years
- Inclination: 96.623°
- Longitude of ascending node: 83.039°
- Argument of periapsis: 82.173°
- Last perihelion: 1 May 1983
- T_{Jupiter}: -0.097
- Earth MOID: 0.049 AU
- Jupiter MOID: 3.35 AU

Physical characteristics
- Mean radius: 0.37±0.05 km
- Mean density: 450±80 kg/m^{3}
- Comet total magnitude (M1): 12.2
- Apparent magnitude: 5.5 (1983 apparition)

C/1983 J1 (Sugano–Saigusa–Fujikawa) is a non-periodic comet discovered by Matsuo Sugano, Yoshikazu Saigusa, and Shigehisa Fujikawa on 8 May 1983. The comet approached Earth at a distance of 0.063 AU on 12 June 1983.

== Observational history ==
The comet was discovered on 8 May 1983 by three observers from Japan, who found the comet independently within 48 minutes. The comet was first discovered by Masuo Sugano from Hyogo using a 15–cm reflector telescope, followed by Yoshikazu Saigusa from Kofu, Yamanashi using a 0.20–m reflector, and Shigehisa Fujikawa from Ōnohara, Kagawa using 12×120 binoculars. They estimated its magnitude to be 7. B. Mayer observed the comet the next day and mentioned it had a central concentration within a coma of 2 arcminutes, while a photograph obtained by E. Everhart revealed a tail 15 arcminutes long. A photo by Skiff and Lugenbuhl using the Pluto Telescope of Lowell Observatory showed the tail was 1.5 degrees long.

The comet upon discovery had passed perihelion, which had taken place on 1 May, and was located in Andromeda, at a solar elongation of 29 degrees. It was quickly found that the comet would make a close approach to Earth, just about a month after C/1983 H1 (IRAS–Araki–Alcock) passed 0.03 AU from Earth. The comet faded slightly during May, despite the fact that it was approaching Earth, and on 20 May its magnitude was estimated to be 8.3.

The comet started to brighten again in early June as it approached Earth. On June 6 the comet was reported to have an apparent magnitude of 6.6 and its coma was 15 arcminutes across. The closest approach to Earth took place at a distance of 0.063 AU (9.4 million km; 5.9 million mi) on 12 June 1983, at 19:00 (UTC). That was the 4th closest observed approach of a comet to Earth in the 20th century. The comet was reported to have been visible with the naked eye, with an apparent magnitude of 5.5, and being diffuse, with a coma about one degree across. After that the comet faded rapidly and on 16 June it had a magnitude of 7.8 and a coma 17 arcminutes across according to David Seargent. The comet was then moving rapidly southwards and was last detected on 20 June.

== Scientific results ==
The comet was observed in radiowaves by the Arecibo Observatory on 11 June 1983. The comet had a very small cross section, about 0.04 km^{2}, indicating it is a very small object. Infrared and visual photometry indicate that it has an effective radius of approximately 0.37 ± 0.05 km (0.230 ± 0.031 mi).

The radio spectrum of the comet revealed lines associated with cyanoacetylene but for other species only upper limits could be calculated. On 13 June the comet was observed in infrared and based on its spectrum the [OI] production rate was calculated to be (7±3.5)×10^{26} atoms/s, which corresponds to a water production rate of 1.1×10^{28} mol/s. Other species like NH2, CN, C2, and C3 were found to be unusually low relative to [OI] when compared with other comets. The dust/gas mass ratio was below 0.01 on 12 June.

== Meteors ==
Robert McNaught noted that Earth would pass at closest intersection point between the orbit of Earth and the comet 2.9 days after the comet and thus there could be a meteor shower. M. Šimek and P. Pecina recorded with radar a small increase in the rate of meteors with duration less than 8 seconds on 14 June and noted that it could be due to the comet but further research was needed. They also observed the same meteor shower in 1984 and concluded that if it was created by the comet, the shower would indicate that 1983 wasn't the first time it passed close to the Sun.
