= Nobuhisa Kojima =

Japanese astronomer (1933–2019)

Nobuhisa Kojima (小島 信久, Kojima Nobuhisa; 1933–2019) was a Japanese astronomer.

Kojima discovered the periodic comets 70P/Kojima and 1972j.

Kojima developed an interest in astronomy from childhood and constructed astronomical equipment himself. He became particularly noted for his comet observations and discoveries. In December 1970, he discovered the periodic comet 70P/Kojima from Ishiki, Aichi Prefecture. The discovery was made on 27 December 1970, when Kojima estimated the comet's brightness at about magnitude 14.

Kojima died in 2019. Asteroid 4351 Nobuhisa was named after him.
