= Masayuki Iwamoto =

Japanese astronomer

Minor planets discovered: 6
4835 Asaeus	January 29, 1989	IAU^{[1]}
5399 Awa	January 29, 1989	MPC^{[1]}
5581 Mitsuko	February 10, 1989	MPC^{[1]}
6383 Tokushima	December 12, 1988	MPC^{[1]}
9943 Bizan	October 29, 1989	MPC^{[1]}
27714 Dochu	January 29, 1989	MPC^{[1]}
1. ^{1} with T. Furuta

Masayuki Iwamoto (岩本 雅之, Iwamoto Masayuki; born 1954) is a Japanese astronomer from Awa in the Tokushima Prefecture. The Minor Planet Center credits him with the co-discovery of 6 asteroids made together with Japanese astronomer Toshimasa Furuta at the Tokushima-Kainan Astronomical Observatory (872) in 1988 and 1989. He also received the Edgar Wilson Award in 2013 for the discovery of comet C/2013 E2, in 2019 for the discovery of the comets C/2018 V1 and C/2018 Y1, and in 2020 for the discovery of C/2020 A2.

The inner main-belt asteroid 4951 Iwamoto, discovered by astronomers Yoshikane Mizuno and Toshimasa Furuta, was named in his honor on 5 March 1996 (M.P.C. 26763).
