= 72P/Denning–Fujikawa =

Periodic comet with 9 year orbit

Discovery
- Discovered by: William Frederick Denning
- Discovery date: 4 October 1881

Orbital characteristics
- Epoch: 2014-07-02 (JD 2456840.5)
- Aphelion: 7.884 AU (Q)
- Perihelion: 0.7842 AU (q)
- Semi-major axis: 4.334 AU (a)
- Eccentricity: 0.8191
- Orbital period: 9.02 yr
- Inclination: 9.17°
- Last perihelion: 2023-Jun-15; 2014-Jul-11; 2005-Jun-20
- Next perihelion: 2032-May-14
- Earth MOID: 0.085 AU (12.7 million km)

Physical characteristics
- Dimensions: 2 ± 1 km (uncertain)

72P/Denning–Fujikawa is a periodic comet discovered on 4 October 1881 by William Frederick Denning. The comet was not seen at another apparition until recovered by Shigehisa Fujikawa in 1978. From 29 December 1978 until 17 June 2014, the comet was lost. On 17 June 2014 the comet was recovered by Hidetaka Sato at apparent magnitude 16 when it was 50 degrees from the Sun. The comet came to perihelion in June 2023, and will next come to perihelion in May 2032.

There were failures to recover the comet during perihelion even in cases where it is estimated that it should have been around magnitude 8, such as in 1960 and 1969, and it has been suggested since then it is only occasionally active. This has resulted in it being classified as a transitional comet. The comet was seen in 1978 at around magnitude 10. The comet was missed in 1987, 1996, and 2005 as it is now expected that the comet only brightened to about magnitude 13–14 during those passages.

In August 1881 the comet passed 0.116 AU (17.4 million km) from Earth. Between 1855 and 2059 perihelion will gradually be lifted from 0.79 AU to 0.82 AU.

72P/Denning–Fujikawa closest Earth approach on 2190-Nov-28
Date & time of closest approach	Earth distance (AU)	Sun distance (AU)	Velocity wrt Earth (km/s)	Velocity wrt Sun (km/s)	Uncertainty region (3-sigma)	Reference
2190-Nov-28 19:13 ± 11 hours	0.126 AU (18.8 million km; 11.7 million mi; 49 LD)	0.999 AU (149.4 million km; 92.9 million mi; 389 LD)	18.8	39.7	± 550 thousand km	Horizons

== Meteor shower ==
The 1834 trail of comet 72P/Denning–Fujikawa may come close to Earth on 7 January 2024 20:38 UT, but will need to be detected by radio/radar methods as the radiant will be near the Sun and Beta Capricorni. Meteor showers from 72P are more likely to occur in August or December, with December being a daytime event.

Numbered comets
Previous; 71P/Clark	72P/Denning–Fujikawa	Next; 73P/Schwassmann–Wachmann
