= IC 410 =

Emission nebula in the constellation Auriga

Emission nebula
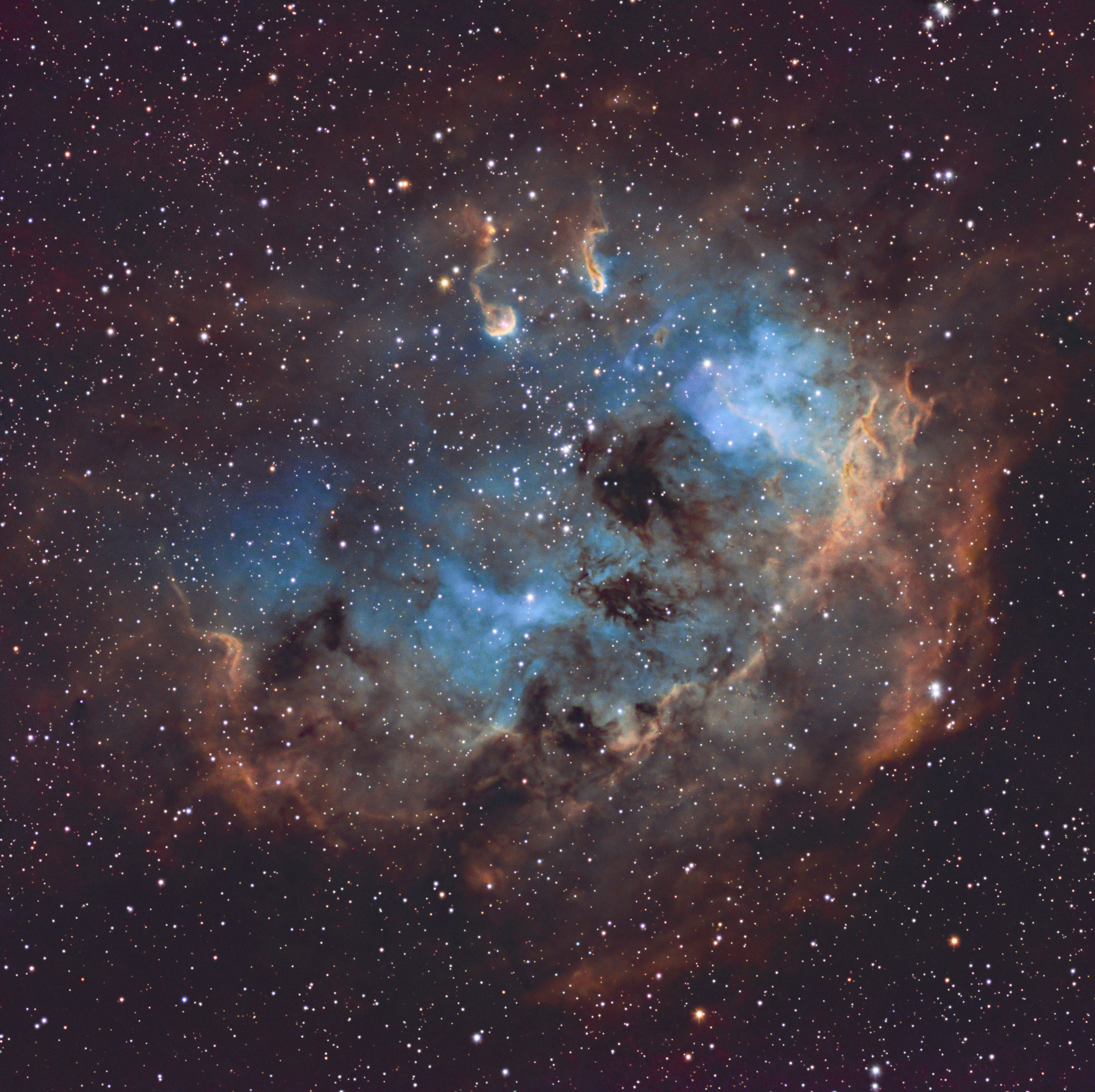
- IC 410 as captured through several visible filters.

Observation data: J2000 epoch
- Right ascension: 05^{h} 21^{m} 60.00^{s}
- Declination: +33° 29′ 0.0″
- Distance: 12,361 ± 1000 ly (3,790 ± 500 pc)
- Constellation: Auriga
- Designations: Tadpole Nebula, Sh 2-236, LBN 807, Min 2-59, CTB 17

IC 410 (also known as the Tadpole Nebula or Sh 2-365) is an emission nebula in the constellation of Auriga. It is part of a larger star-forming complex that includes the nearby IC 405 (Flaming Star Nebula) and the open clusters M36 and M38. The nebula's nickname, the Tadpole Nebula, derives from two prominent dense structures of gas and dust (each approximately 10 light-years long) that resemble tadpoles with long tails.

== Characteristics ==
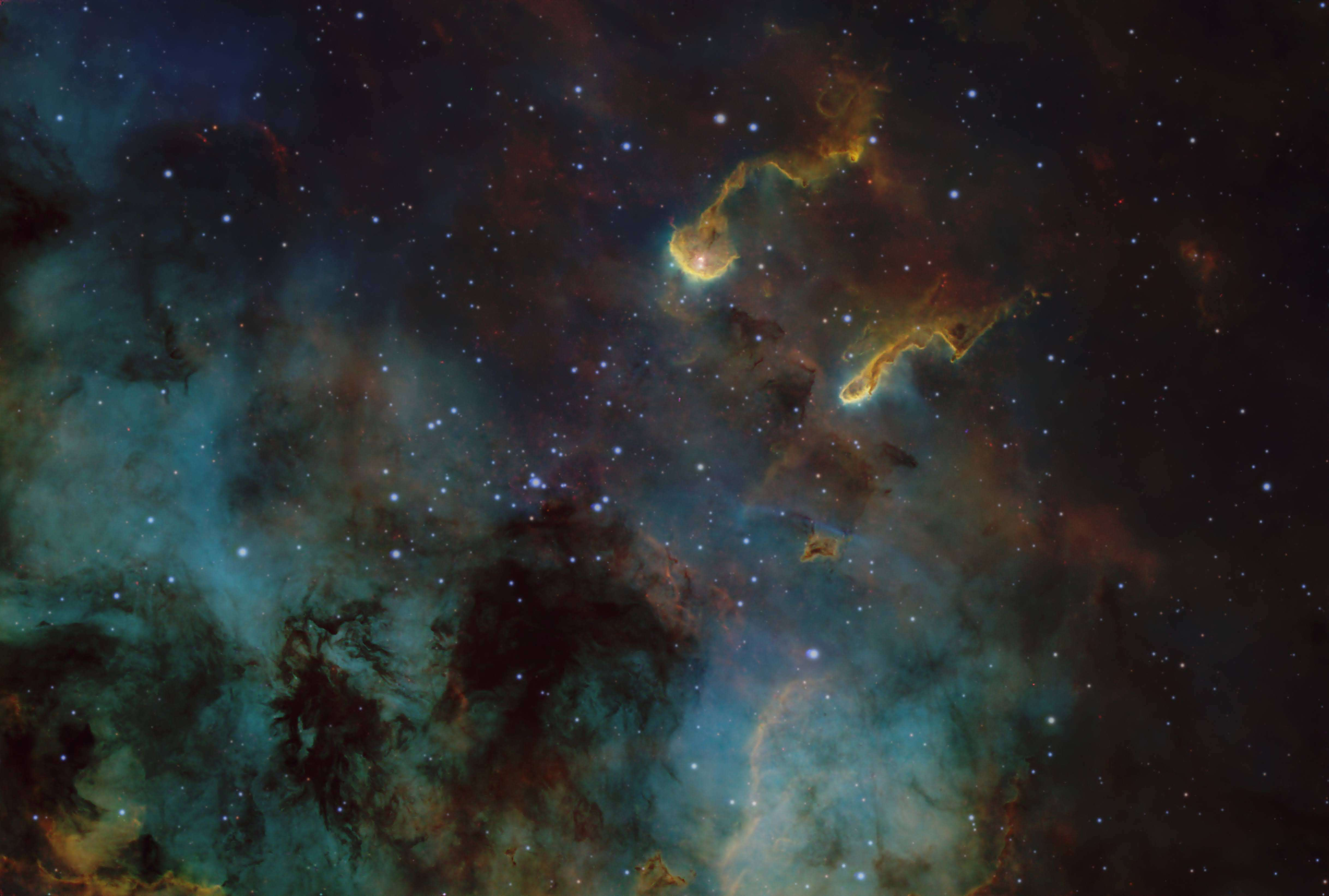
Image of the tadpoles located in IC-410.

The open star cluster NGC 1893 is embedded within IC 410. The young cluster is estimated to be about 4 million years old, contains hot, massive O and B-type stars whose intense radiation and stellar winds ionize the surrounding gas, causing the nebula to glow, and sculpt its features.

IC 410 also contains smaller nebula identified as Simeis 129 and Simeis 130, which are considered the "tadpoles". These point away from the central cluster due to stellar winds and radiation pressure eroding the pillars, similar to the Pillars of Creation in the Eagle Nebula. The dense heads are likely sites of ongoing or future star formation.

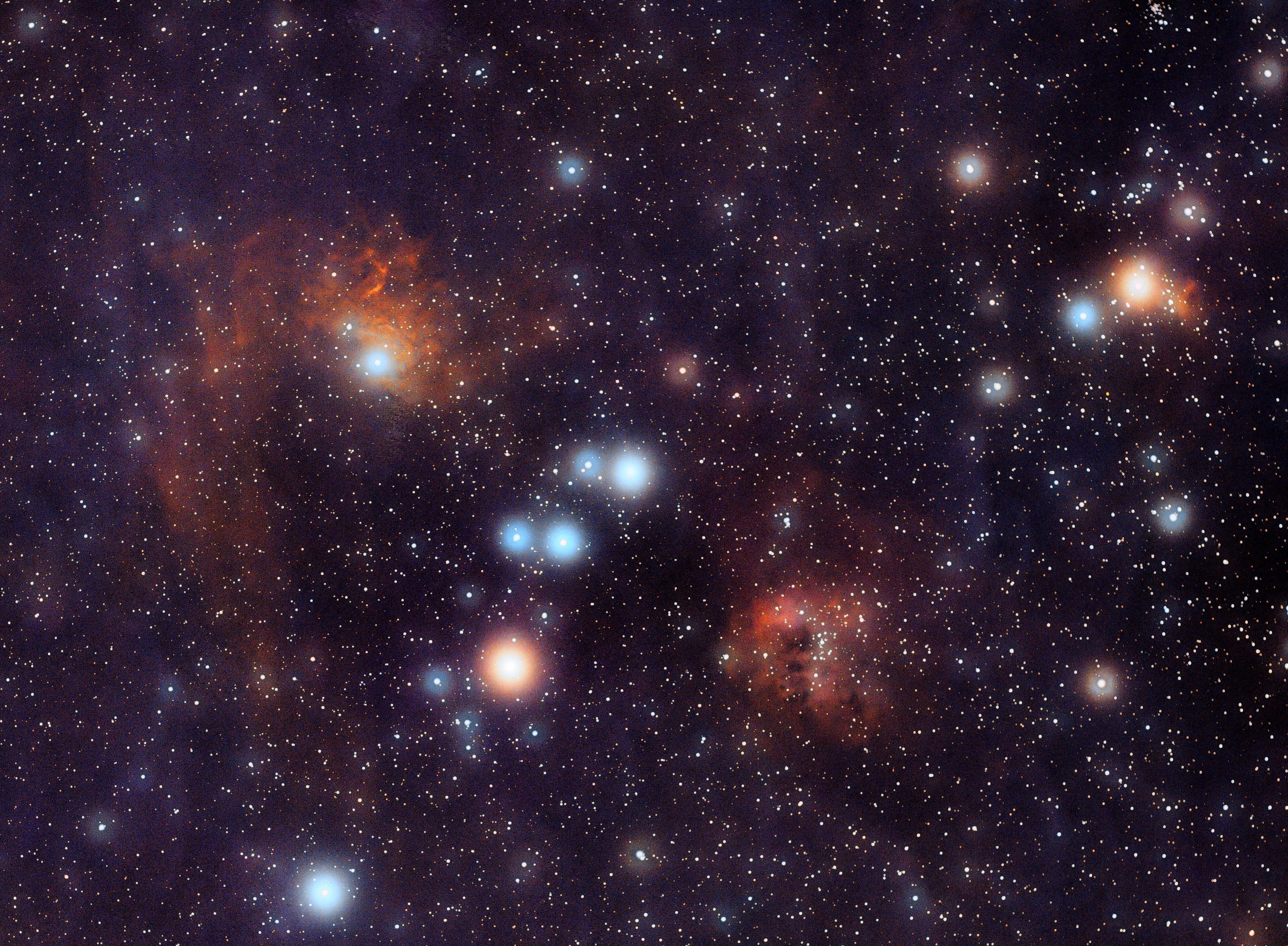
Image of Flaming Star and Tadpole Nebula
