= Shigehisa Fujikawa =

Japanese astronomer

Shigehisa Fujikawa (藤川 繁久, Fujikawa Shigehisa) is a Japanese astronomer. He co-discovered seven comets from 1969 to 2018, these were:

- 72P/Denning–Fujikawa
- C/1969 P1 (Fujikawa)
- C/1970 B1 (Daido–Fujikawa)
- C/1975 T1 (Mori–Sato–Fujikawa)
- C/1983 J1 (Sugano–Saigusa–Fujikawa)
- C/2002 X5 (Kudo–Fujikawa)
- C/2018 V1 (Machholz–Fujikawa–Iwamoto)
