= IC 405 =

Emission and reflection nebula in the constellation Auriga

Emission nebula
- reflection nebula
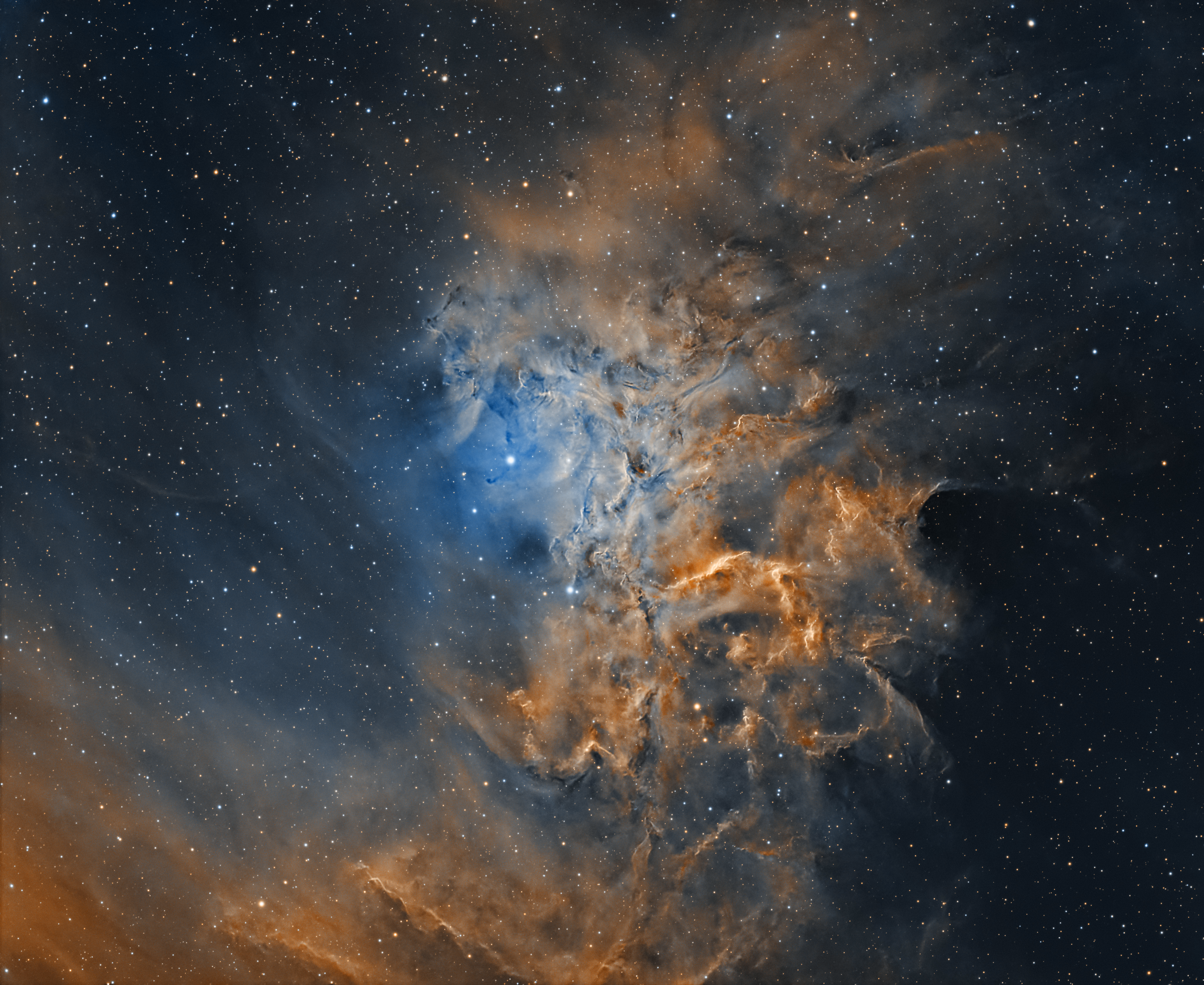
- IC 405 captured with Ha, OIII, and SII narrowband filters and processed in the Hubble Palette

Observation data: J2000 epoch
- Right ascension: 05^{h} 16^{m} 05^{s}
- Declination: +34° 27′ 49″
- Distance: 1500 ly
- Apparent magnitude (V): +6.0?
- Apparent dimensions (V): 37′ × 10′
- Constellation: Auriga

Physical characteristics
- Radius: 2.5 ly
- Designations: Flaming Star Nebula, Caldwell 31, Sharpless 229

IC 405 (also known as the Flaming Star Nebula, SH 2-229, or Caldwell 31) is an emission and reflection nebula in the constellation Auriga north of the celestial equator, surrounding the bluish, irregular variable star AE Aurigae. It shines at magnitude +6.0. Its celestial coordinates are RA 05^{h} 16.2^{m} dec +34° 28′. It is located near the emission nebula IC 410, the open clusters M38 and M36, and the K-class star Iota Aurigae.

The nebula measures approximately 37.0' x 19.0', and lies about 1,500 light-years away from Earth. It is believed that the proper motion of the central star can be traced back to the Orion's Belt area. The nebula is about 5 light-years across.

== Gallery ==
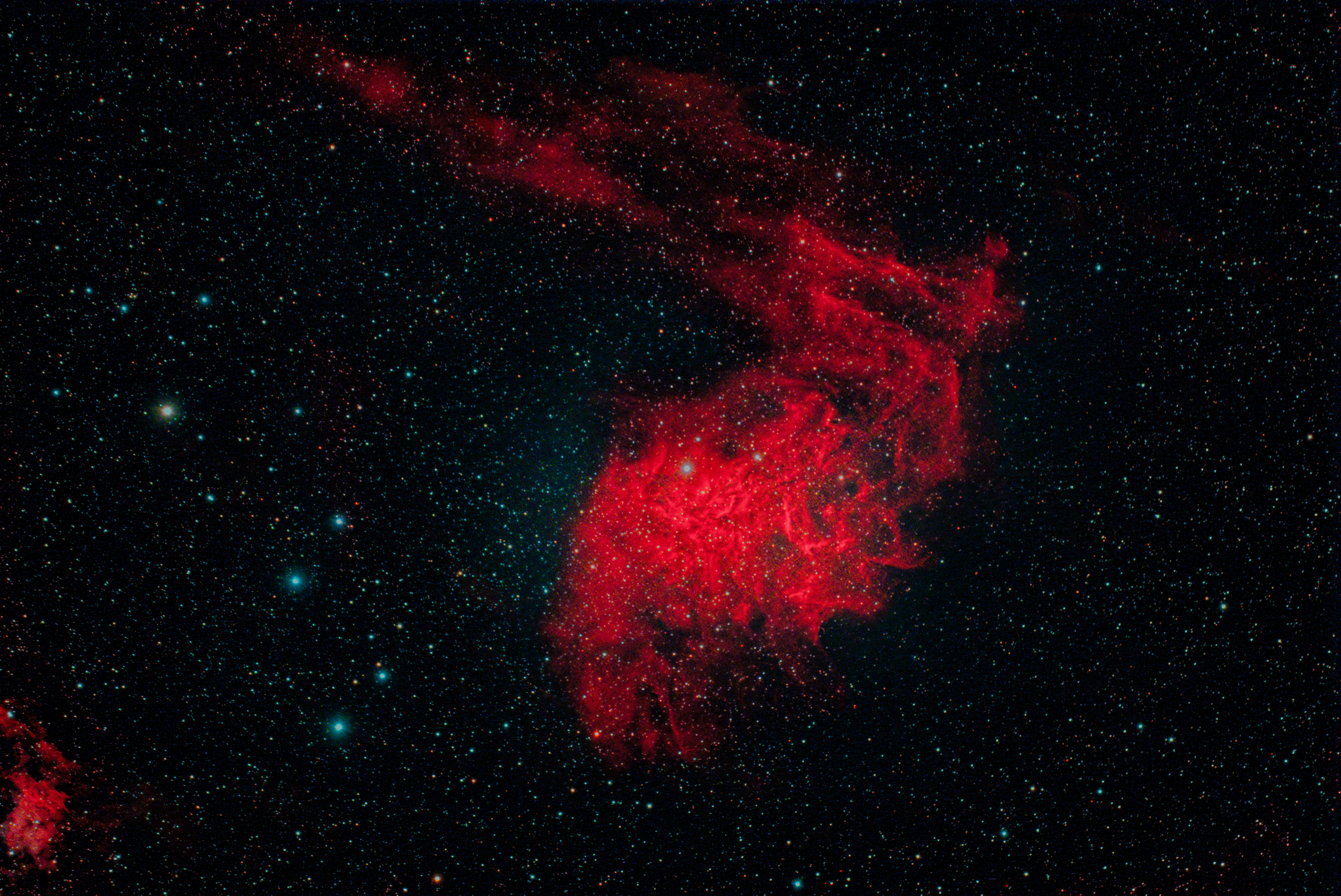
Amateur astronomer photo of the Flaming Star Nebula with Celestron C9.25 and Hyperstar, ZWO2600MC Pro camera

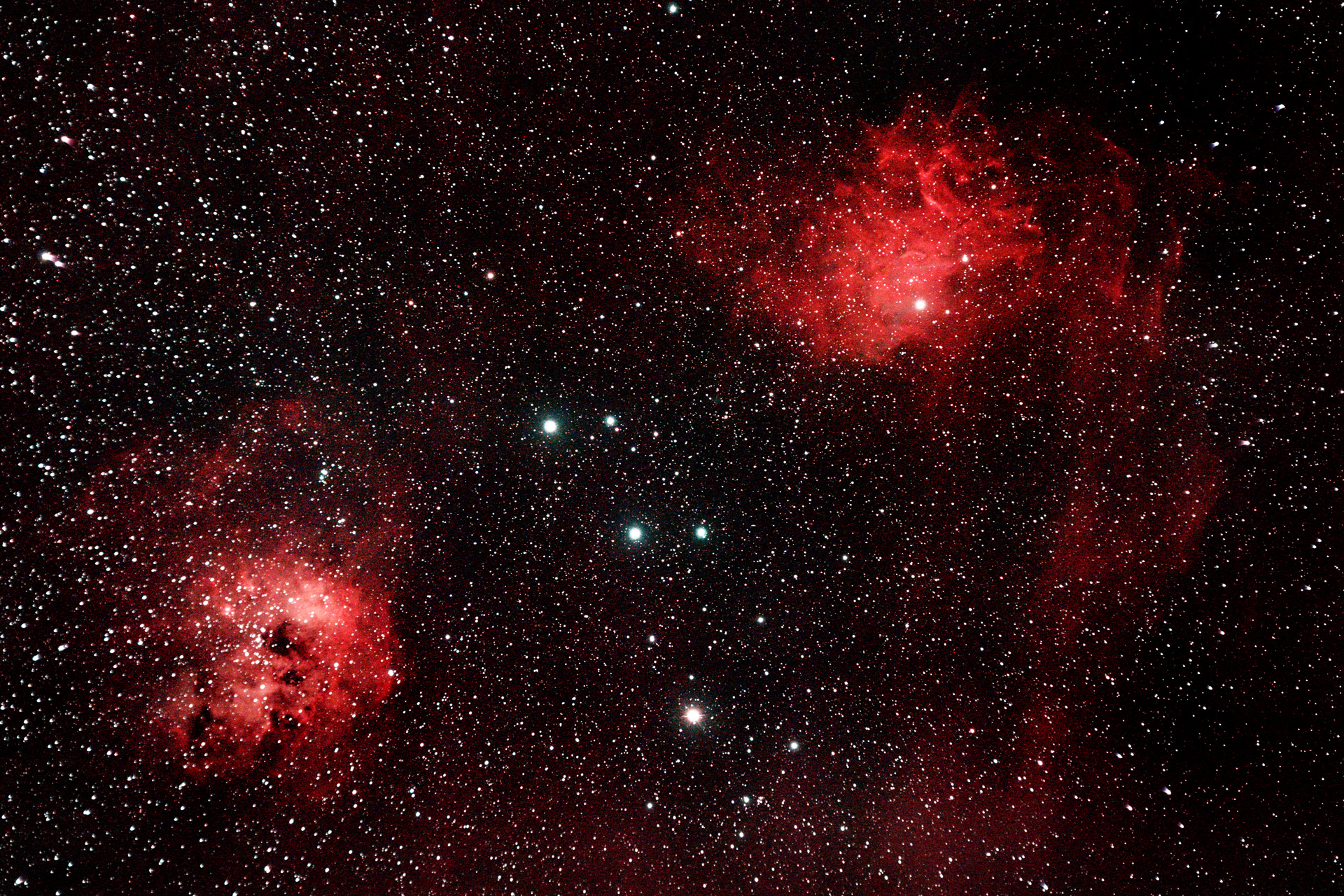
Amateur picture taken with a Canon R6 DSLR and a 110mm ED refractor of the Flaming Star nebula around AE Aurigae

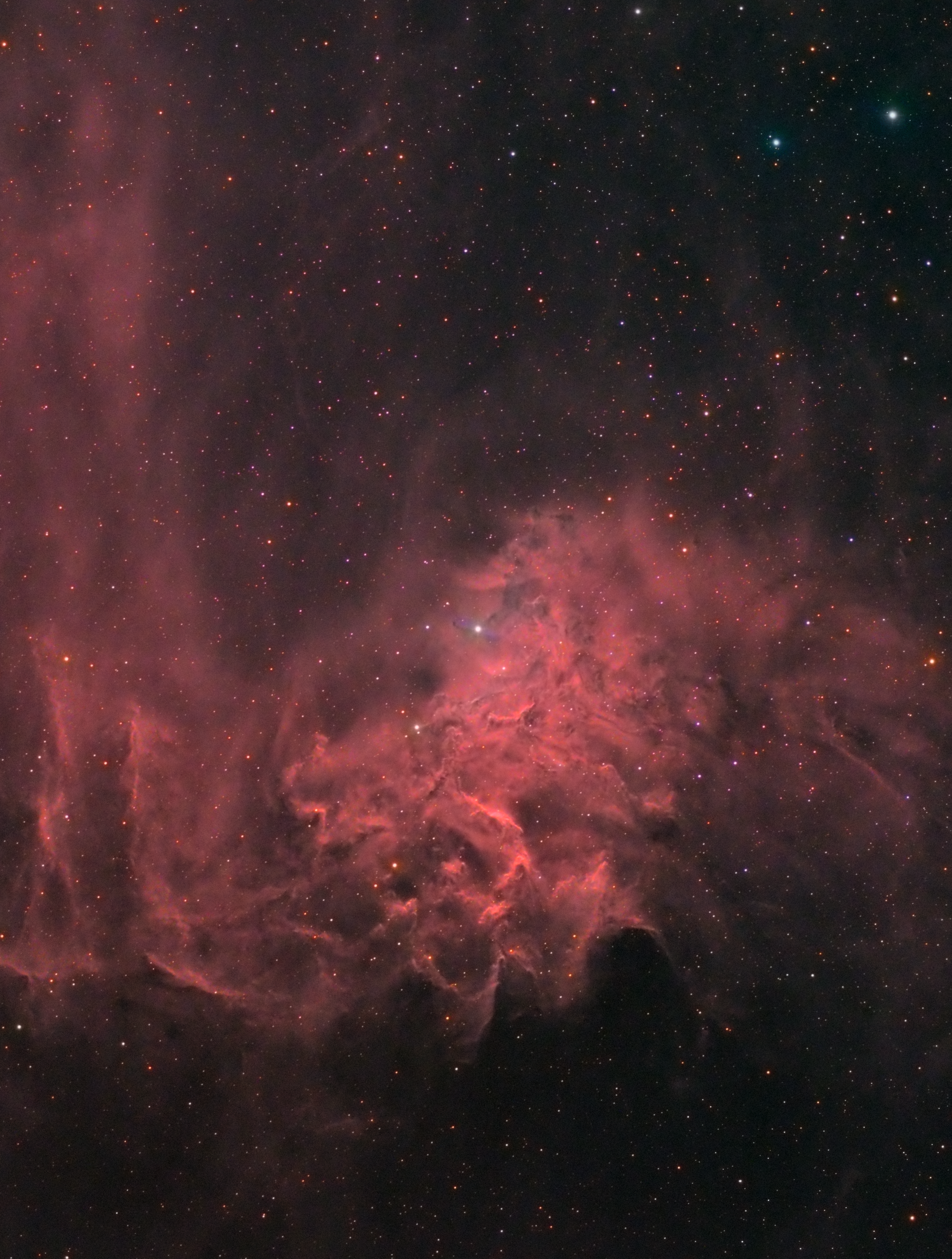
Amateur photo of the Flaming Star Nebula taken with an AT72ED II telescope and ZWO ASI1600MM Pro camera—9 hours 30 minutes of total exposure in HaRGB.
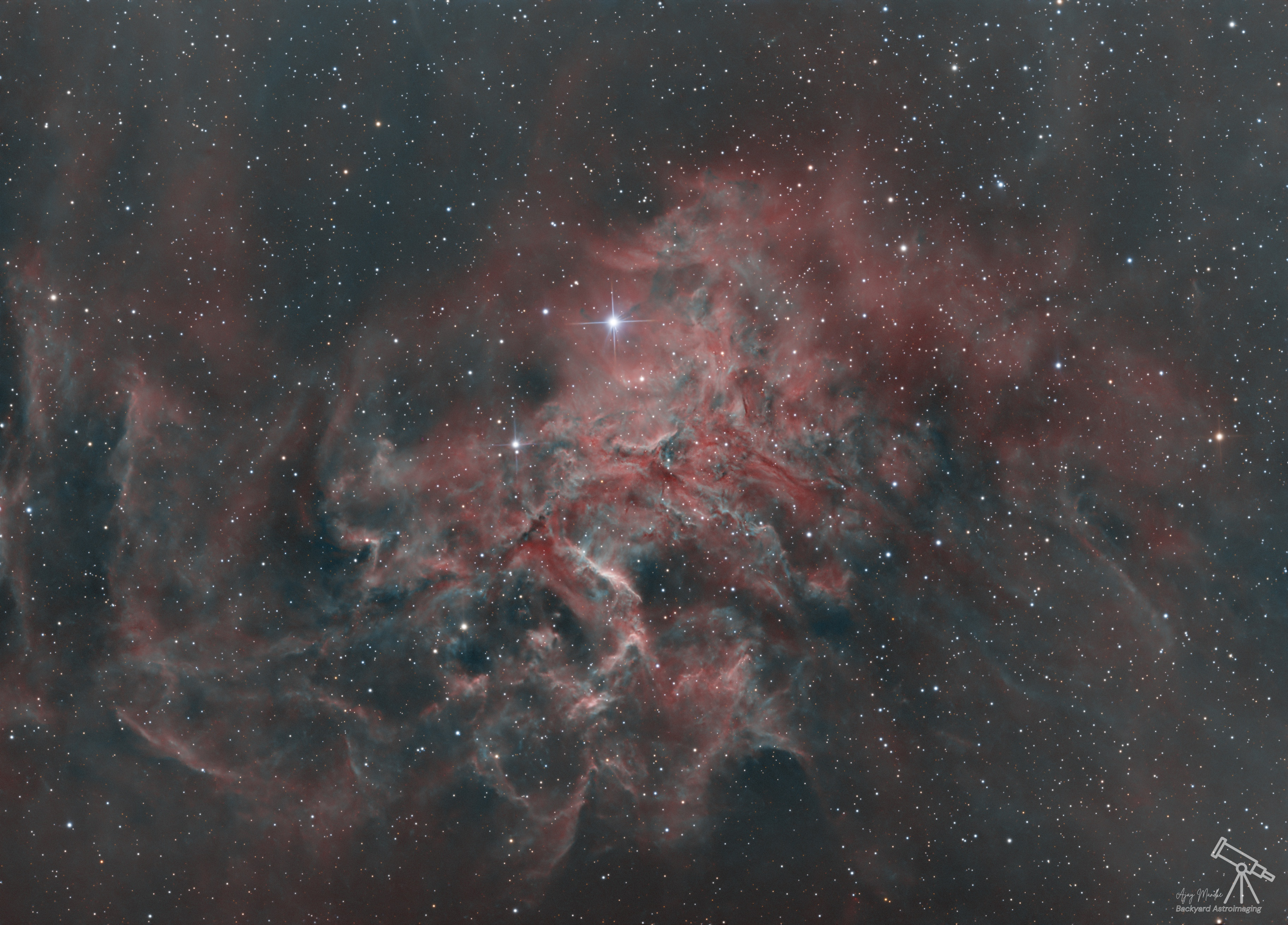
Stellar Embers and Ashes - Flaming Star Nebula (IC 405), Auriga. captured using Skywatcher Quattro 200P, ASI294MM Pro using Sii, Ha and Oiii filter. Total 7 hours from Bortle 9

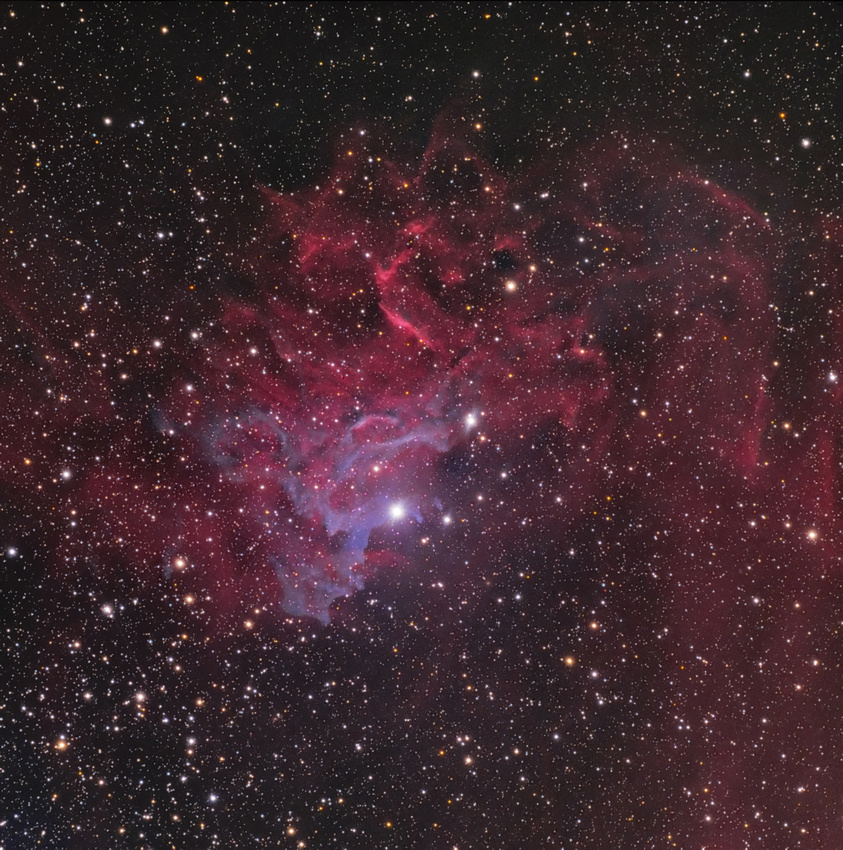
White light image of the Flaming Star Nebula showing the "smoke" of the reflection nebula.

== See also ==
- Auriga (Chinese astronomy)
- Caldwell catalogue
- Cosmic dust
- List of largest nebulae

== Sources ==
- Pasachoff, Jay M. (2000). "Atlas of the Sky". Stars and Planets. New York, NY: Peterson Field Guides. p. 578. ISBN 0-395-93432-X.
- Eicher, David J. (1988). The Universe from Your Backyard: A Guide to Deep-Sky Objects from Astronomy Magazine. AstroMedia (Kalmbach Publishing Company). ISBN 0-521-36299-7.
