= C/2016 R2 (PanSTARRS) =

Carbon monoxide-rich comet

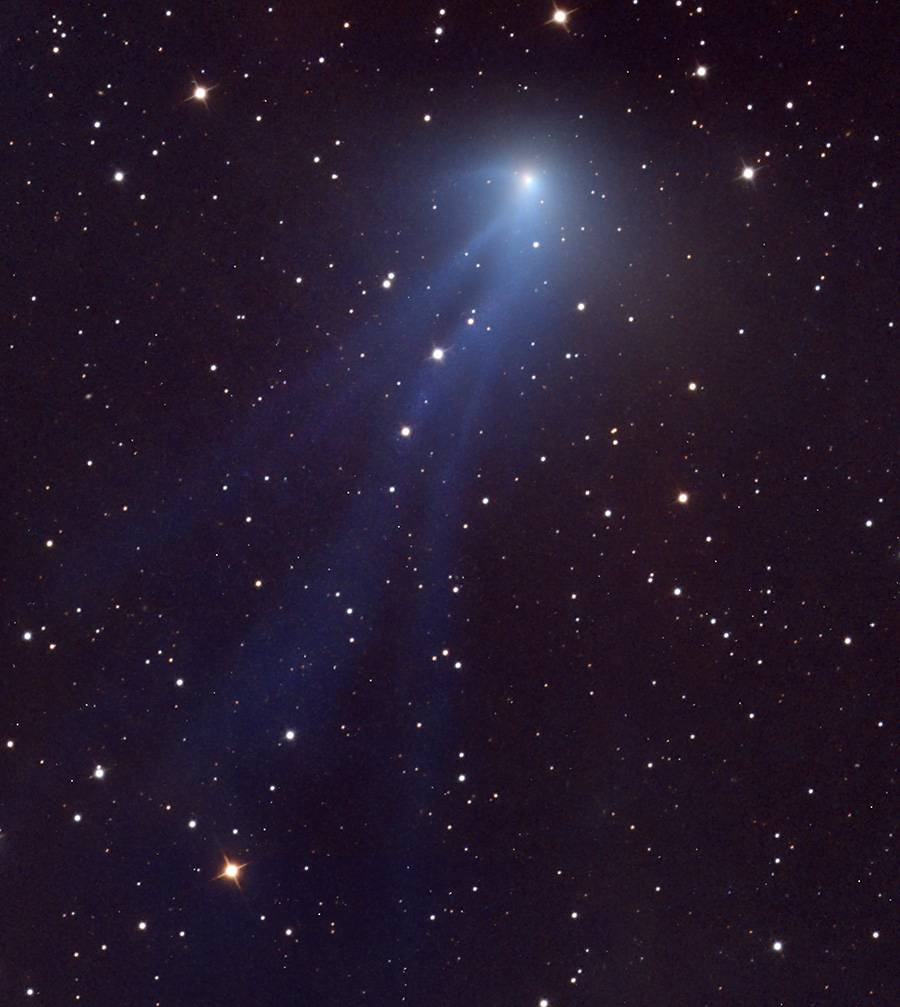
- C/2016 R2 photographed from the Mount Lemmon Observatory on 16 January 2018. The comet's blue color comes from ionized carbon monoxide (CO^{+}).

Discovery
- Discovered by: Pan-STARRS
- Discovery site: Haleakalā Observatory
- Discovery date: 7 September 2016

Orbital characteristics
- Epoch: 29 May 2018 (JD 2458267.5)
- Observation arc: 1,762 days (4.82 years)
- Number of observations: 4,319
- Aphelion: ≈1,600 AU (inbound) ≈1,100 AU (outbound)
- Perihelion: 2.602 AU
- Semi-major axis: ≈780 AU (inbound) ≈530 AU (outbound)
- Eccentricity: 0.99631
- Orbital period: ≈22,000 years (inbound) ≈12,000 years (outbound)
- Inclination: 58.224°
- Longitude of ascending node: 80.569°
- Argument of periapsis: 33.192°
- Mean anomaly: 0.001°
- Last perihelion: 9 May 2018
- T_{Jupiter}: 1.060
- Earth MOID: 1.720 AU
- Jupiter MOID: 2.117 AU

Physical characteristics
- Mean diameter: 5–30 km (3–19 mi)
- Comet total magnitude (M1): 7.3
- Comet nuclear magnitude (M2): 11.2
- Apparent magnitude: 9.8 (2018 apparition)

C/2016 R2 (PanSTARRS), or simply C/2016 R2, is an unusual long-period comet that is extremely rich in carbon monoxide and nitrogen, but contains very little water. It was discovered on 7 September 2016 by the Pan-STARRS astronomical survey at Haleakalā Observatory in Hawaiʻi. The comet attracted attention from many astronomers as it approached its closest point to the Sun in May 2018 when it was inside of the asteroid belt at 2.6 AU. It has been observed to have a very complex tail. The comet nucleus is estimated to be 5–30 km (3–19 mi) in diameter.

Inbound, the comet orbited the Sun on a 22,000 year orbit, which took it out about 1600 AU. It was found to differ from typical comets, and was found to be rich in carbon monoxide (CO) but depleted in hydrogen cyanide (HCN), resulting in a blue coma. The blue color is thought to come from the rich amounts of carbon monoxide being ionized. The comet made its closest approach to the Sun in May 2018.

== Orbit ==
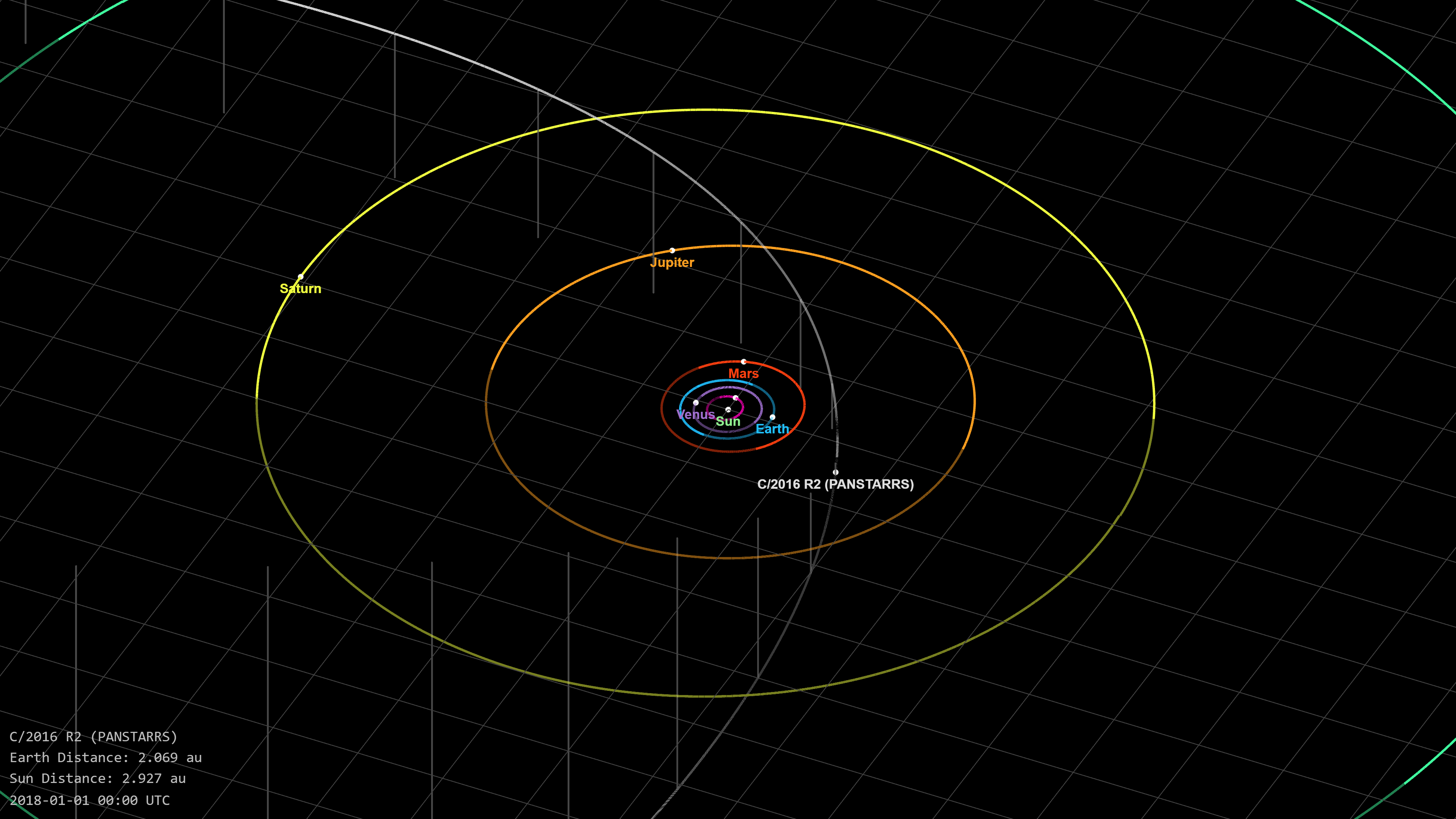
Diagram showing C/2016 R2's highly tilted and eccentric orbit through the Solar System, with the planets shown and labeled

C/2016 R2 is a long-period comet that follows a highly distant and eccentric orbit around the Sun. It is classified as a dynamically old Oort cloud comet, because it has passed close to the Sun many times in the past. C/2016 R2 passed perihelion on 9 May 2018 and will return in about 12,000 years. Before 2018, C/2016 R2's last perihelion was about 21,600 years ago.

== Composition and gas emissions ==
=== Volatiles ===
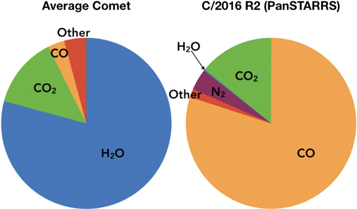
Comparison of C/2016 R2's volatile gas composition (right) to that of an average comet (left)

C/2016 R2 is remarkable for its unusual gas composition, which is extremely rich in carbon monoxide (CO) and molecular nitrogen (N_{2}), but extremely poor in water (H_{2}O). The high abundance of CO and N_{2} in a comet is unusual because they are hypervolatile compounds, which means they easily sublimate at low temperatures and should become severely depleted over the age of the Solar System. In terms of number of molecules, the volatile composition of C/2016 R2's coma comprises over 80% CO gas, roughly 12–17% carbon dioxide (CO_{2}) gas, (Note: McKay et al. (2019) reported a CO_{2}/CO mixing ratio of 18.2%±3.5%. Given the percentage of CO in C/2016 R2's volatile composition (80% CO in terms of number of molecules), multiplying that percentage by the CO_{2}/CO mixing ratio gives roughly 14.6%±2.8% CO_{2} (full rounded range 12–17%).) roughly 4–6% N_{2} gas, (Note: Mousis et al. (2021) cite reported N_{2}/CO mixing ratio of 0.06±0.01 and 0.08. Given the percentage of CO in C/2016 R2's volatile composition (80% CO in terms of number of molecules), multiplying that percentage by the N_{2}/CO mixing ratio gives roughly 5%±1% N_{2} (full range 4–6%).) and trace amounts (≤1%) of water vapor and other compounds. This is completely different from typical Solar System comets, whose comas are primarily made of water vapor, 1%–30% of CO_{2} and CO, trace amounts (few percent) of miscellaneous organic compounds, and virtually no N_{2}.

During January–February 2018 (3 months before perihelion), when C/2016 R2 was 2.8 AU from the Sun, it was estimated that C/2016 R2 was outgassing roughly 4,600 kilograms (4.5 long tons; 5.1 short tons) of CO per second (~1×10^{29} CO molecules per second)—this is a very large outgassing rate comparable to those seen in the exceptionally active comets Comet Hale–Bopp and 17P/Holmes. (Note: Carbon monoxide or CO has a molar mass of 28.010 grams/mole, where 1 mole is equivalent to 6.022×10^{23} molecules (Avogadro's number). The January–February 2018 CO emission rate of ~1×10^{29} molecules/second can be divided by 6.022×10^{23} molecules/mole to give ≈1.66×10^{5} moles of CO/second. Dividing the moles of CO by the molar mass of CO gives a CO mass emission rate of ≈4.65×10^{6} grams/second, or ≈4,650 kilograms/second when multiplying by 1 kilogram/1000 gram. Note that different estimates for C/2016 R2's CO molecule emission during January–February 2018 range from (9.54±0.91)×10^{28} molecules/second (McKay et al. 2019) to 1.44×10^{29} molecules/second (Biver et al. 2018)) In addition, C/2016 R2 was estimated to be outgassing roughly 700 kilograms (0.7 long tons; 0.8 short tons) of CO_{2} per second, (Note: Carbon dioxide or CO_{2} has a molar mass of 44.009 grams/mole, where 1 mole is equivalent to 6.022×10^{23} molecules (Avogadro's number). The January–February 2018 CO_{2} emission rate of (4.8±1.1)×10^{28} molecules/second given in McKay et al. (2019) can be divided by 6.022×10^{23} molecules/mole to give ≈16,600 moles of CO_{2}/second. Dividing the moles of CO_{2} by the molar mass of CO_{2} gives a CO_{2} mass emission rate of ≈7.31×10^{5} grams/second, or ≈731 kilograms/second when multiplying by 1 kilogram/1000 gram. For simplicity, the result may be rounded down to one significant figure: ≈700 kilograms/second.) 200 kilograms (0.2 long tons; 0.2 short tons) of N_{2} per second, (Note: Molecular nitrogen or N_{2} has a molar mass of 28.014 grams/mole, where 1 mole is equivalent to 6.022×10^{23} molecules (Avogadro's number). The January–February 2018 N_{2} emission rate of (4.8±1.1)×10^{28} molecules/second given in McKay et al. (2019) can be divided by 6.022×10^{23} molecules/mole to give ≈7,970 moles of N_{2}/second. Dividing the moles of N_{2} by the molar mass of N_{2} gives a N_{2} mass emission rate of ≈2.23×10^{5} grams/second, or ≈223 kilograms/second when multiplying by 1 kilogram/1000 gram. For simplicity, the result may be rounded down to one significant figure: ≈200 kilograms/second.) and 9 kilograms (20 pounds) of water per second (Note: Water or H_{2}O has a molar mass of 18.015 grams/mole, where 1 mole is equivalent to 6.022×10^{23} molecules (Avogadro's number). The January–February 2018 H_{2}O emission rate of (3.1±0.2)×10^{26} molecules/second given in McKay et al. (2019) can be divided by 6.022×10^{23} molecules/mole to give ≈515 moles of H_{2}O/second. Dividing the moles of H_{2}O by the molar mass of H_{2}O gives a H_{2}O mass emission rate of ≈9.27×10^{3} grams/second, or ≈9.27 kilograms/second when multiplying by 1 kilogram/1000 gram. For simplicity, the result may be rounded down to one significant figure: ≈9 kilograms/second.) during January–February 2018. Observations suggest that these gases were mainly emitted directly from the surface of C/2016 R2's nucleus, though some CO was also observed being produced outside the nucleus due to sublimation of ejected ice grains.

Spectroscopic observations by various telescopes on Earth and in space have identified at least 12 different chemical species emitting from C/2016 R2 during January–February 2018. Besides CO, CO_{2}, water, and N_{2}, these include methane (CH_{4}), ethane (C_{2}H_{6}), hydrogen cyanide (HCN), methanol (CH_{3}OH), formaldehyde (H_{2}CO), carbonyl sulfide (OCS), acetylene (C_{2}H_{2}), and ammonia (NH_{3}). Methylidyne radicals (CH), cyano radicals (CN), dicarbon (C_{2}), and tricarbon (C_{3}) have also been detected in C/2016 R2's coma. When compared to typical comets, all of these chemical species in C/2016 R2 (except N_{2}) are heavily depleted relative to CO, but are enriched relative to water. The sulfur-containing compounds hydrogen sulfide (H_{2}S) and carbon monosulfide (CS) were not detected in C/2016 R2, which suggests that they are also highly depleted. Only the mixing ratios of methanol to CO_{2} (CH_{3}OH/CO_{2}) and methanol to methane (CH_{3}OH/CH_{4}) in C/2016 R2 are considered typical of Solar System comets.

Radiation from the Sun can ionize gases and trigger photochemical reactions within the coma of C/2016 R2, which causes it to glow with spectral emission lines. For example, sunlight can break down CO and CO_{2} into atomic oxygen, which has been detected emitting green and red light in C/2016 R2's coma. Cations of N^{+}_{2}, CO^{+}, and CO^{+}_{2} have been detected in C/2016 R2's coma. CO^{+} is the most dominant ion in C/2016 R2's coma, although at distances close to the comet's nucleus (within 1,000 km or 620 mi), CO^{+}_{2} becomes more abundant as CO^{+} becomes neutralized by frequent collisions between molecules in the denser gas environment. The dominant blue spectral emission of CO^{+} (and N^{+}_{2} by a small part) gives C/2016 R2 its deep blue color. This contrasts with typical comet colors, which range from gray ("neutral") to yellow or green due to C_{2} spectral emission and sunlight scattering by dust particles.

More than 99% of elemental nitrogen in C/2016 R2's gas composition is contained in the form N_{2}, while the remaining amount is contained in the trace species NH_{3} and HCN. The majority of elemental carbon and oxygen in C/2016 R2's gas composition is contained in CO and CO_{2}. Whereas C/2016 R2's primary carbon content matches those of typical comets, C/2016 R2's primary oxygen content does not—for typical comets, oxygen is mainly stored in water. The presence of molecular oxygen (O_{2}) in C/2016 R2 has not been ruled out, however—if O_{2} exists in the comet, it might be abundant and it could account for a sizable fraction of C/2016 R2's oxygen content instead. Analysis of nitrogen spectral emission in C/2016 R2's coma suggests that its ^{14}N/^{15}N isotope ratio is at least 100, which is consistent with ^{14}N/^{15}N ratios seen in other comets. Likewise, analysis of CO^{+} spectral emission in C/2016 R2's coma suggests that its ^{12}C/^{13}C isotope ratio is 73±20, which is consistent with the ^{12}C/^{13}C ratios of either the Solar System (89±2) or the interstellar medium (68±15) within error bars.

=== Dust and metals ===
Telescope observations have shown very little amounts of dust emitting from C/2016 R2, which indicates the comet is dust-poor. Little is known about C/2016 R2's dust and non-volatile (refractory) composition, so the atomic abundances in the comet's overall composition are unknown. Equally small amounts of atomic iron (Fe I) and nickel (Ni I) vapor where detected in C/2016 R2's coma during February 2018; the concentration of nickel relative to iron is close to 1, similar to other typical comets. It is estimated that C/2016 R2 was emitting roughly 4×10^{23} atoms of iron and nickel per second (or up to ~40 grams of iron and nickel per second) during this time, (Note: Extended Data Figure 2 of Manfroid et al. (2021) give a logarithmic iron (Fe) and nickel (Ni) vapor emission rate of log Q(Fe+Ni) ≈ 23.6. This value can be plugged in as an exponent of 10 to give the actual Fe+Ni emission rate of 10^{23.6} ≈ 3.98×10^{23} atoms/second. The molar masses of Fe and Ni are 55.845 grams/mole and 58.693 grams/mole, respectively. Since the Ni/Fe mixing ratio in C/2016 R2 is close to 1 within an order of magnitude, it is reasonable to take the arithmetic average of the Fe and Ni molar masses: 57.269 grams/mole. To convert the Fe+Ni emission rate to moles/second, divide the atoms/second by 6.022×10^{23} atoms/mole (Avogadro's number); this gives roughly ≈0.661 moles of Fe+Ni. Following the assumption that Ni and Fe are in equal proportions, we can simply multiply moles by the average Fe+Ni molar mass (57.269 grams/mole) to get ≈37.9 grams of Fe+Ni. The result may be rounded down to 1 significant figure, which would give ≈40 grams.) which is one of the highest iron and nickel emission rates seen among comets. A 2021 study led by Manfroid et al. suggested that space weathering of iron- and nickel-bearing compounds in comets could lead to their observed iron and nickel vapor emissions, although the nature of these compounds is unknown.

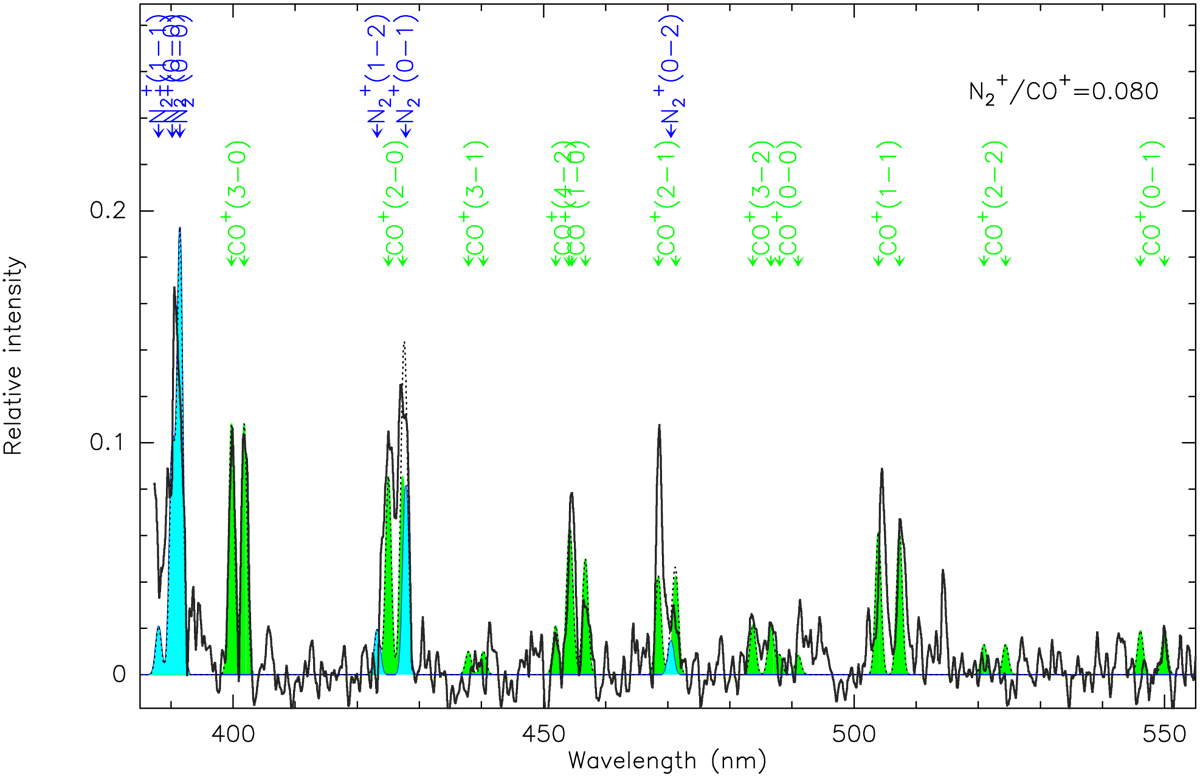
Visible spectrum of C/2016 R2 measured in February 2018. Emission lines caused by molecular nitrogen (N_{2}) are highlighted in blue, while emission lines caused by carbon monoxide (CO) are highlighted in green.

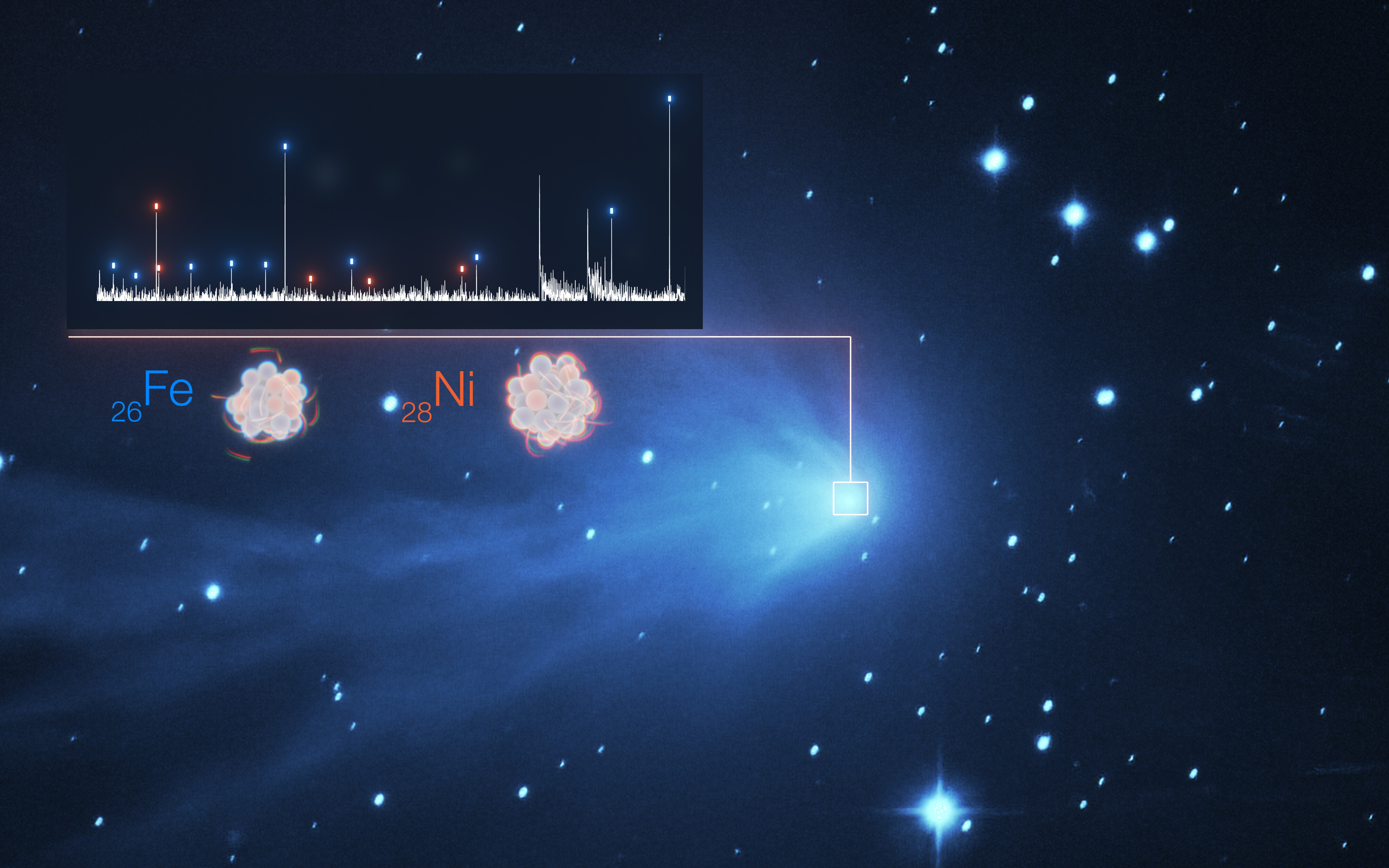
Ultraviolet spectrum of C/2016 R2 (top left) overlaid on top of a telescope photograph of the comet. Blue points in the spectrum highlight emission lines caused by iron vapor, while red points highlight emission lines caused by nickel vapor.

=== Similar objects ===
As of 2025, only two other long-period comets have been identified as analogues of C/2016 R2: C/1908 R1 (Morehouse) and C/1961 R1 (Humason). These two comets share C/2016 R2's blue color, low dust emission, CO- and N_{2}-rich composition, and relatively high N_{2}/CO mixing ratios of a few percent. All three may belong to a distinct and rare group of comets, although further discoveries and measurements of their water abundances are needed to confirm this.

== Coma and tail morphology ==
Timelapse showing changes in C/2016 R2's ion tail over a duration of a few hours. The images were taken by the SPECULOOS project on 18 January 2018, when the comet was 2.85 AU away from the Sun.

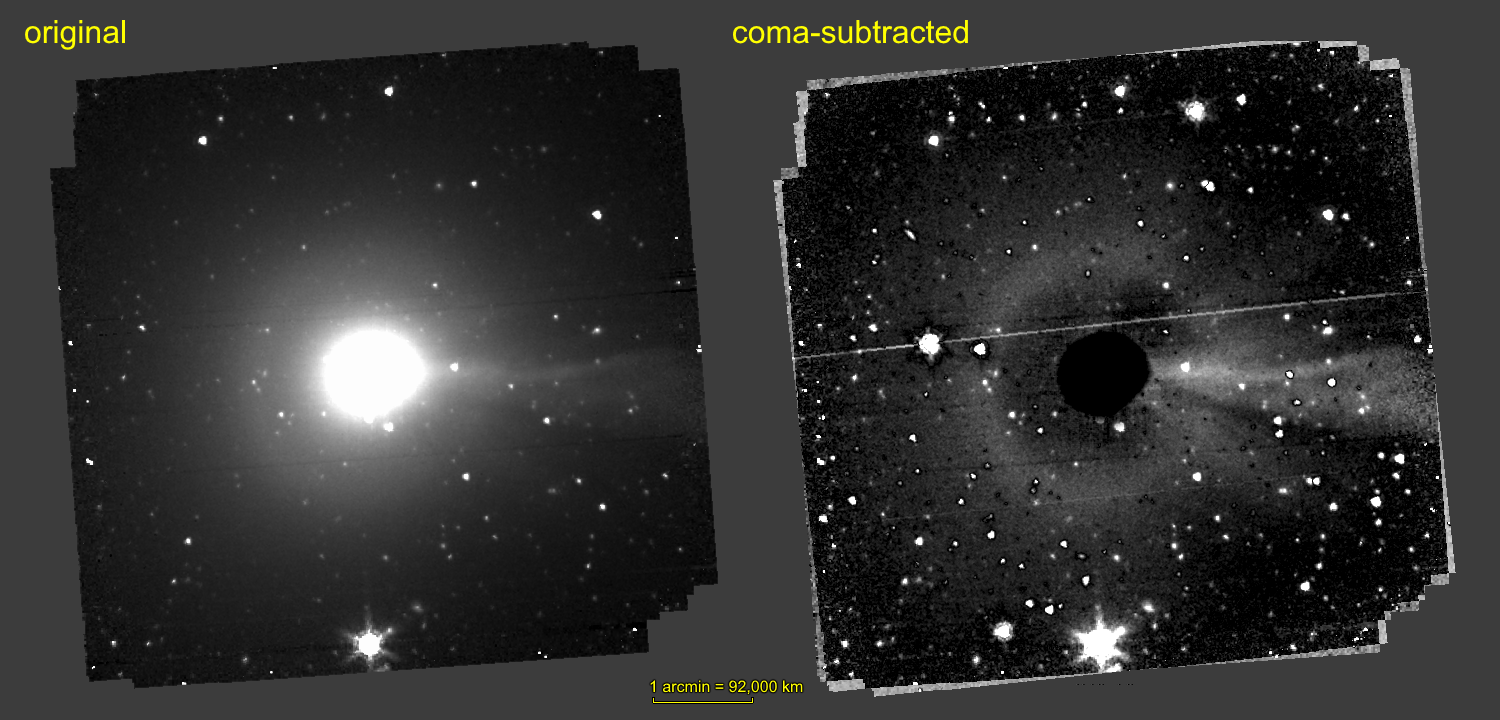
Spitzer Space Telescope infrared image of C/2016 R2 on 21 February 2018, showing a circular shell and an ion tail. The right panel is an enhanced version of the left panel.

Observations of C/2016 R2 during the leadup to its perihelion in 2018 showed that it had a diffuse and spherical coma, due to its predominantly gaseous emissions. The appearance of C/2016 R2's coma has been described as diffuse in dates as early as 2016. The coma of C/2016 R2 grew as large as 350,000 km (220,000 mi) (angular diameter 3.7 arcminutes) in March 2018. Infrared imaging by the Spitzer Space Telescope in February 2018 revealed subtle structures within the inner coma of C/2016 R2, including a spiral feature possibly caused by a gas jet rotating with the nucleus and a transient shell or ring-shaped feature about 140,000 km (87,000 mi) in diameter. The shell or ring-shaped feature might have been caused by an impulsive outgassing event, as it was only seen on 21 February 2018. If this shell or ring was made of CO ice grains, the sublimation of these grains might explain the observed production of CO gas outside the nucleus.

Imaging observations by Spitzer and radio telescopes in January–February 2018 have shown that the comet's inner coma appeared brighter and elongated toward the direction of the Sun, due to intensified outgassing from the heated, sunlit surface of C/2016 R2's nucleus. During this time, C/2016 R2's sun-facing hemisphere was outgassing CO with an amount and speed (0.51 km/s or 0.32 mi/s) twice as high as its nightside (0.25 km/s or 0.16 mi/s). Spectroscopic observations were able to identify this enhanced sunward outgassing by detecting a slight blueshift in the spectral emissions of CO.

C/2016 R2 had a deep blue ion tail that was visible from November 2017 to the end of April 2018. The tail spanned over 3 million km (1.9 million mi) in length (angular length 15 arcminutes) during January and February 2018. The tail was primarily made of CO^{+} ions that were being blown away from the Sun by the solar wind. Like the coma, the ion tail of C/2016 R2 owes its blue color to the spectral emission of CO^{+}. During January and February 2018, the ion tail of C/2016 R2 exhibited complex structures and streamers that visibly changed within hours. Images from January 2018 showed that the ion tail appeared to twist and wave, possibly because of a concentrated gas jet that was rotating with the comet's nucleus. Cometary outbursts and fluctuations in the solar wind may have additionally contributed to the complex structure of C/2016 R2's tail.

== Nucleus ==
Little is known about the properties of C/2016 R2's nucleus, because it was heavily obscured by intense outgassing during its 2017–2018 apparition. Because different volatile substances have different volatilities (e.g. CO sublimates more easily than water) and could be trapped within non-volatile substances, it is possible that the observed volatile composition of the coma may not match the intrinsic volatile composition of the nucleus. The coma surrounding C/2016 R2's nucleus makes it appear brighter and larger than it actually is—for example, if one assumes the nucleus's apparent brightness is entirely due to sunlight reflecting from a dark, solid surface, then the result would be an overestimated diameter of 38 km (24 mi). One method of estimating the diameter of C/2016 R2's nucleus is by measuring its CO outgassing rate—if the CO outgassing is proportional to the surface area of its nucleus, then its nucleus must be between 5 and 30 km (3.1 and 18.6 mi) in diameter. The upper end of this diameter range would be considered larger than an average comet. If the diameter of C/2016 R2's nucleus truly lies within this range, then it would suggest that its areal water outgassing rate is indeed below average, which would mean that the nucleus's intrinsic volatile composition should match that of the coma.

== Observational history ==
=== Discovery ===
C/2016 R2 was discovered on 7 September 2016 by the Pan-STARRS astronomical survey at Haleakalā Observatory in Hawaiʻi.

Astronomers first noticed the unusual nature of C/2016 R2 in 2017 when it began to develop a tail. C/2016 R2 was notably bluer than any other comet seen in the past 50 years. C/2016 R2 did not come close enough to Earth to be seen with binoculars.

Apparent path of C/2016 R2 in Earth's sky from 2017 to 2019. The comet's positions over 14-day intervals are marked with colored points (from magenta to cyan) and are labeled with their respective dates in yellow. The apparent loops at the path's ends are caused by parallax due to Earth's orbital motion around the Sun.

== Origin ==
Although the highly distant and eccentric orbit of C/2016 R2 suggests that it originated from the Oort cloud, the comet's unusual volatile composition makes its origin unclear. If C/2016 R2 formed in the Solar System, it could have either accreted from the protosolar disk 4.6 billion years ago or it could have formed as an icy fragment ejected from a planetary collision. In both scenarios, C/2016 R2 must have formed far from the Sun, beyond the CO and N_{2} frost lines where temperatures are cold enough (less than 50 K) for these substances to condense into solid grains.

=== Protosolar disk hypothesis ===
For the protosolar disk accretion scenario, a 2021 study led by Mousis et al. suggested that C/2016 R2 could accumulate its high concentration of CO and N_{2} if it formed between 10 and 15 AU from the proto-Sun, where the CO and N_{2} frost lines reside. At these distances, condensed CO and N_{2} grains would be pure and would outnumber water ice grains. However, the outcome of this formation process is highly dependent on various unknown properties of the protosolar nebula, such as its gas viscosity. C/2016 R2's overabundance of simple molecules like N_{2} and CO suggests that its formation environment was chemically inactive and protected from photodissociation by solar radiation. It is believed that the lack of photodissociation prevented simple molecules from chemically reacting, which limited the production of more complex molecules like NH_{3} and HCN in C/2016 R2.

If C/2016 R2 formed in the protosolar disk, then it must have been ejected via gravitational interactions with the giant planets, as that is the most plausible pathway to its present-day eccentric and distant orbit. A 2022 study led by Andersen et al. showed 90% of objects that formed near the N_{2} and CO frost lines were ejected within 10 million years after their formation, with 1–10% of these ejected objects ending up in the Oort cloud. The early ejection of C/2016 R2 into the Oort cloud would allow it to retain most of its original hypervolatiles for billions of years. While this scenario could explain both C/2016 R2's hypervolatile abundance and the apparent rarity of hypervolatile-rich Oort cloud comets, its chronology with respect to other early Solar System events (e.g. the Sun's escape from its birth cluster, the jumping-Jupiter scenario, etc.) is uncertain.

=== Collisional fragment hypothesis ===
If C/2016 R2 formed from a collision event, then it should come from a differentiated icy dwarf planet like Pluto, as such objects are known to be abundant in hypervolatiles. A similar scenario has been proposed for the interstellar object 1I/ʻOumuamua. For C/2016 R2, the collision event would have likely taken place in the Kuiper belt billion years ago, when it was being gravitationally perturbed by the 2:1 orbital resonance between Jupiter and Saturn (see grand tack hypothesis). However, this hypothesis is complicated by the fact that the relative abundances of CO, CH_{4}, and N_{2} seen in C/2016 R2 do not match the surface composition of Pluto, and that the collisional dynamics and interiors of icy bodies beyond Neptune are poorly understood. Various studies have shown that it is difficult to retain large amounts of N_{2} in energetic impacts, which further complicates this hypothesis.

=== Captured interstellar object hypothesis ===
It is possible that C/2016 R2 did not originally form in the Solar System and was instead captured from another star system, which would explain its unique volatile composition. For example, the interstellar comet 2I/Borisov is known to have a CO-rich and water-poor composition similar to C/2016 R2. The possibility of an interstellar origin for C/2016 R2 was first considered by McKay et al. in 2019, who suggested that the Sun might have exchanged Oort cloud comets with other closely passing stars when it was still forming in its birth cluster. The ^{12}C/^{13}C isotope ratio of C/2016 R2 could potentially match that of the interstellar medium, which might support an interstellar origin. However, the ^{12}C/^{13}C ratio could alternatively match that of the Solar System due to uncertainties and the orbit of C/2016 R2 resembles those of many known Oort cloud comets, so the hypothesis of an interstellar origin is considered unlikely.

== See also ==
- 3I/ATLAS – An interstellar comet with a very high CO_{2}/H_{2}O mixing ratio, like C/2016 R2
- C/2002 VQ_{94} (LINEAR) – A large long-period comet with a relatively high concentration of N_{2} (N_{2}/CO = 6%})
- 29P/Schwassmann–Wachmann – A highly active centaur exhibiting frequent outbursts with high amounts of CO and CO_{2} outgassing
