= 3I/ATLAS =

Interstellar comet in 2025

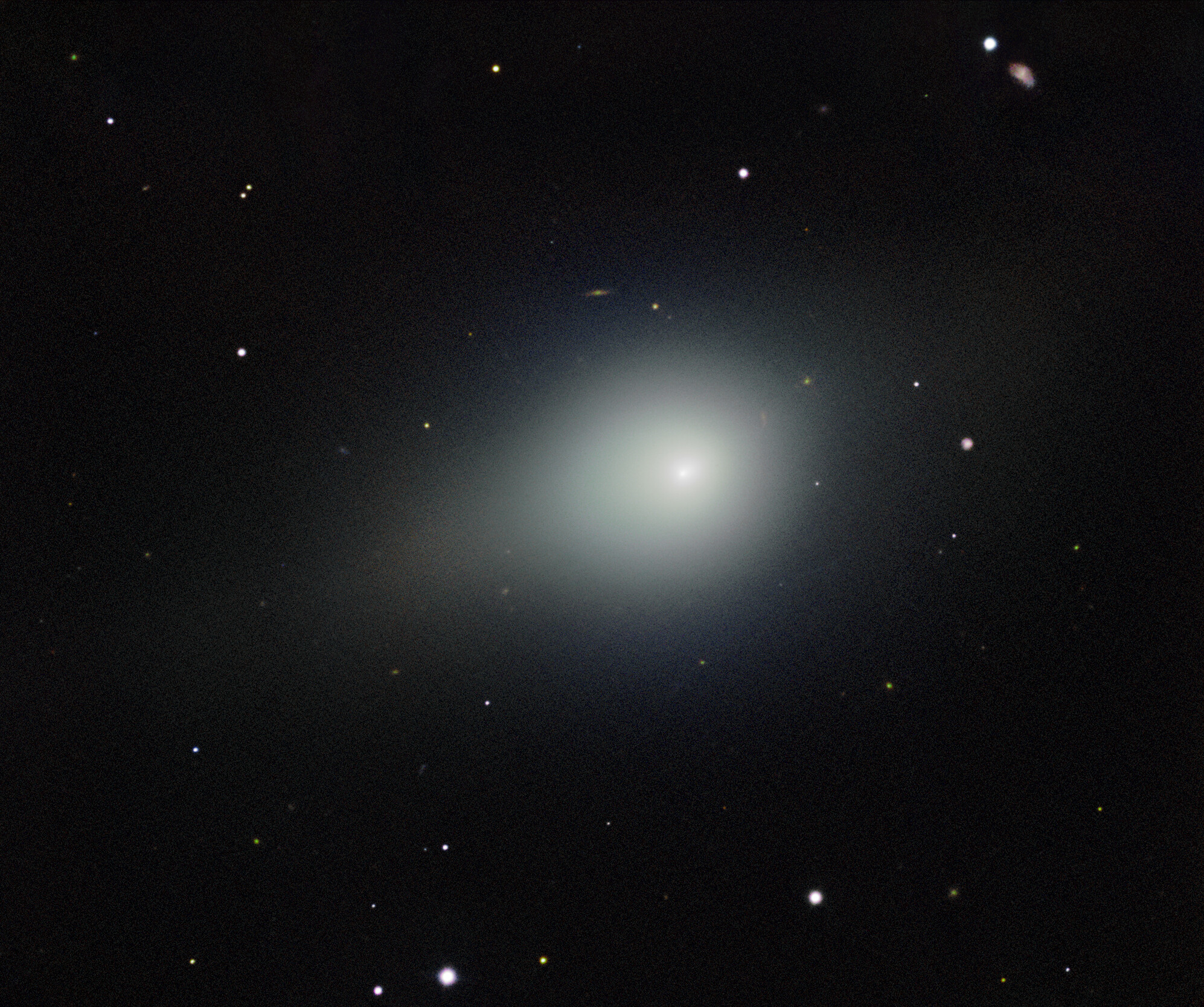
- 3I/ATLAS photographed in color by the Gemini North telescope on 26 November 2025

Discovery
- Discovery site: ATLAS–CHL (W68)
- Discovery date: 1 July 2025

Designations
- MPC designation: C/2025 N1
- Alternative designations: A11pl3Z

Orbital characteristics
- Epoch: 27 October 2026 (JD 2461340.5)
- Observation arc: 378 days
- Earliest precovery date: 7 May 2025 (55 days before discovery)
- Number of observations: 782 used of 7886
- Orbit type: Hyperbolic (interstellar)
- Perihelion: 1.3564 AU (Note: An n-body integration shows 3I/ATLAS came to perihelion about 7 minutes before the two-body JPL SBDB epoch 19 February 2026 solution. (Changing JPL SBDB 11:52 to Horizons 11:45.) The comet also passed 0.00003 AU (4.5 thousand km; 2.8 thousand mi) closer to the Sun. (Math: 1.356 481 "JPL SBDB" − 1.356 448 "Horizons" = 0.000 03))
- Semi-major axis: −0.26380 AU
- Eccentricity: 6.12347±0.00002 (Note: The JPL SBDB lists a 1-sigma uncertainty for the eccentricity/perihelion (which covers 68% of the possibilities). A 3-sigma uncertainty would be 3 times larger and would cover 99.7% of the possibilities.)
- Max. orbital speed: 68.3 km/s at perihelion (Note: Formula for the perihelion velocity: $\sqrt{-GM(2/q-1/a)}$, where $G$ is the gravitational constant, $M$ the mass of the Sun, $q$ the comet's perihelion distance, and $a$ its semi-major axis. Calculation:) v_{∞} = 58 km/s (Note: Formula for the hyperbolic excess velocity: $\sqrt{-GM/a}$, where $G$ is the gravitational constant, $M$ the mass of the Sun, and $a$ the comet's semi-major axis. Calculation:)
- Inclination: 175.24±0.00002° (retrograde and inclined 4.89°)
- Longitude of ascending node: 323.03±0.0007°
- Argument of periapsis: 128.80±0.0001°
- Last perihelion: 29 October 2025; 11:45 UT
- Earth MOID: 0.362 AU
- Mars MOID: 0.018 AU (Note: Mars-MOID is on 3I's outbound node, so Mars crosses this point in March 2027.)
- Jupiter MOID: 0.246 AU

Physical characteristics
- Mean diameter: Nucleus: 0.520 to 0.748 km (non-gravs) (Note: Comet diameter computed from assumed density of 200–600 kg/m^{3} and estimated mass of 4.4×10^{10} kg from non-gravitational acceleration observed in the comet.); 0.32 to 5.6 km (Hubble); CO_{2} coma: ≈700000 km
- Mass: 4.4×10^{10} kg
- Synodic rotation period: 15.48±0.70 h (imaging); 16.16±0.01 h (light curve)
- Spectral type: B–V = 0.98±0.23; V–R = 0.71±0.09; R–I = 0.14±0.10
- Absolute magnitude (H): >15.4
- Comet total magnitude (M1): 12.5±0.9
- Apparent magnitude: 19.9 (18 April 2026)

3I/ATLAS, also known as C/2025 N1 (ATLAS) and previously as A11pl3Z, is an interstellar comet discovered on 1 July 2025 by the Asteroid Terrestrial-impact Last Alert System (ATLAS) station. The comet follows an unbound, hyperbolic trajectory past the Sun, and passed by Earth at 1.8 AU, posing no threat. The prefix "3I" designates it as the third confirmed interstellar object passing through the Solar System, after 1I/ʻOumuamua and 2I/Borisov.

3I/ATLAS is an active comet consisting of a solid icy nucleus and a coma, which is a cloud of gas and icy dust escaping from the nucleus. The Sun is responsible for the comet's activity because it heats up the comet's nucleus to sublimate its ice into gas, which outgasses and lifts up dust from the comet's surface to form its coma. Images taken by the Hubble Space Telescope and various interplanetary spacecraft suggest that the diameter of 3I/ATLAS's nucleus is less than 1 km (0.62 mi). Observations by the James Webb Space Telescope (JWST) have shown that 3I/ATLAS is unusually rich in carbon dioxide, and contains a small amount of water ice, water vapor, carbon monoxide, carbonyl sulfide, and methane. Observations by the Very Large Telescope have also shown that 3I/ATLAS is emitting cyanide gas and atomic nickel vapor, at concentrations similar to those seen in Solar System comets.

The comet came to solar conjunction on 21 October 2025, (Note: The minimum angular separation between the Sun and 3I/ATLAS was 2.59 degrees on 21 October 2025 when the comet was 2.4 AU from Earth.) and it came closest to the Sun on 29 October 2025, at a distance of 1.36 AU (203 million km; 126 million mi) from the Sun, which is between the orbits of Earth and Mars. The comet appears to have originated from either the Milky Way's thin disk, or thick disk; if 3I/ATLAS originated from the thick disk, the comet could be at least 7 billion years old—older than the Solar System.

== History ==
=== Discovery ===
3I/ATLAS was discovered on 1 July 2025 (Note: In the Minor Planet Center discovery announcement, the discovery observation time (marked with an asterisk "*") is "2025 07 01.218880," which translates to 1 July 2025 05:15:11 UT. While earlier observations were later found, this was the first that was reported to the Minor Planet Center, received on 1 July 2025 at 07:48 UT.) by the NASA-funded ATLAS survey telescope at Río Hurtado, Chile (observatory code W68). At apparent magnitude 18, the newly discovered object was entering the inner Solar System at a speed of 61 km/s (140,000 mph; 220,000 km/h) relative to the Sun, located 3.50 AU (524 million km; 325 million mi) from Earth and 4.51 AU from the Sun, and was moving in the sky along the border of the constellations Serpens Cauda and Sagittarius, near the galactic plane. It was given the temporary designation 'A11pl3Z' and the discovery observations were submitted to the International Astronomical Union's Minor Planet Center (MPC). These observations initially suggested that the object could be on a highly eccentric path that might come close to Earth's orbit, which led the MPC to temporarily list the object on the Near-Earth Object Confirmation Page until the orbit could be confirmed.

Follow-up observations from other observatories, involving both professional and amateur astronomers, began to reveal that the object's trajectory would not come near Earth, but instead could be interstellar with a hyperbolic trajectory. Pre-discovery observations of 3I/ATLAS confirmed its interstellar trajectory; these included Zwicky Transient Facility (ZTF, observatory code I41) observations from 28 to 29 June 2025 that were found within a few hours of the initial report, ZTF observations from 14 to 21 June 2025, and ATLAS observations from 25 to 29 June 2025. Amateur astronomer Sam Deen has noted additional ATLAS pre-discovery observations from 5 to 25 June 2025, and suspected that 3I/ATLAS was not discovered earlier because it was passing in front of the Galactic Center's dense star fields, where the comet would be hard to discern.

Initial observations of 3I/ATLAS were unclear on whether it is an asteroid or a comet. Various astronomers including Alan Hale reported no cometary features, but observations on 2 July 2025 by the Deep Random Survey (X09) at Chile, Lowell Discovery Telescope (G37) at Arizona, and Canada–France–Hawaii Telescope (T14) at Mauna Kea all showed a marginal coma with a potential tail-like elongation 3 arcseconds in angular length, which indicated the object is a comet. On 2 July 2025, the MPC announced the discovery of 3I/ATLAS and gave it the interstellar object designation "3I", signifying it being the third interstellar object confirmed. The MPC also gave 3I/ATLAS the non-periodic comet designation C/2025 N1 (ATLAS). By the time 3I/ATLAS was officially named, the MPC had collected 122 observations of the comet from 31 different observatories.

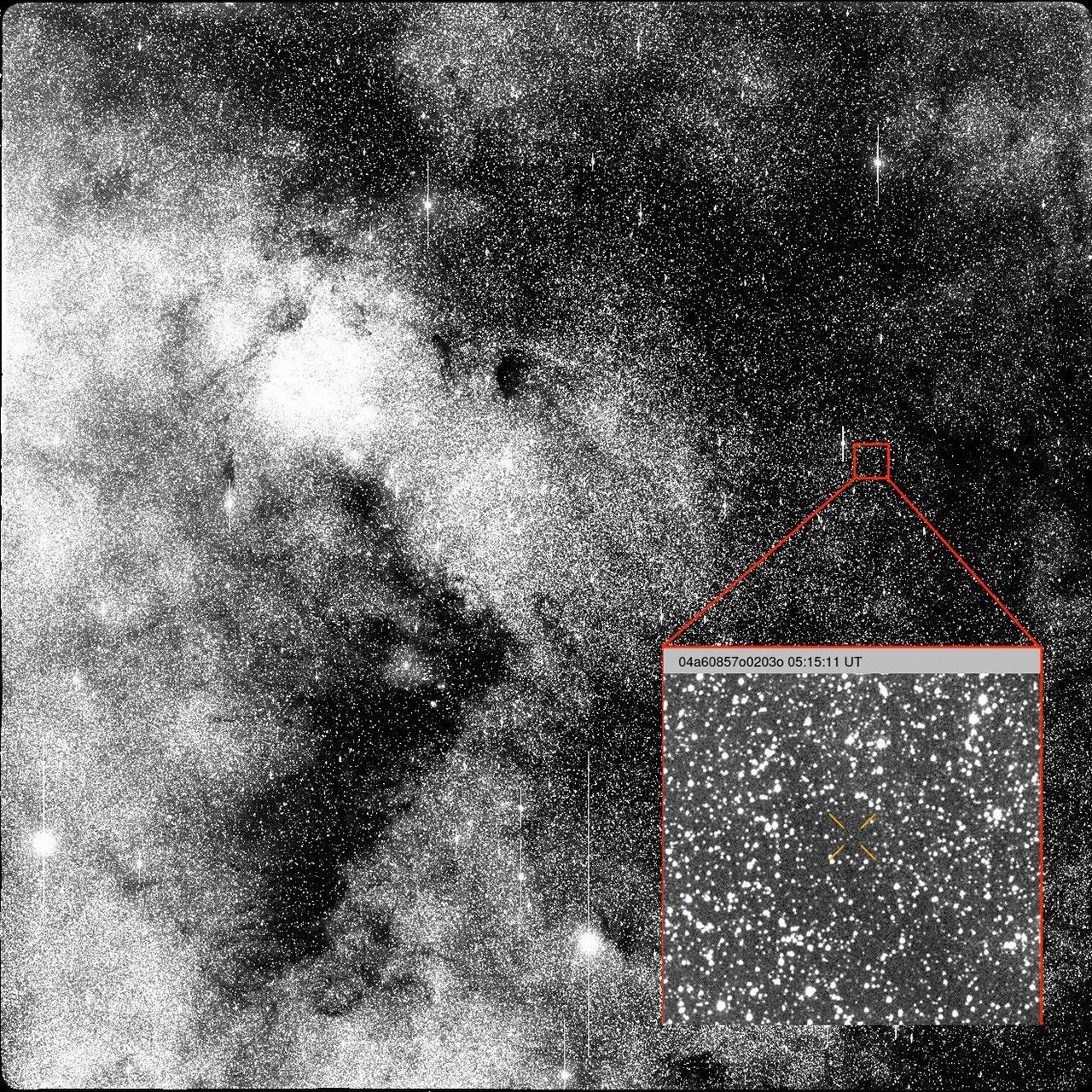
3I/ATLAS was discovered in a starry region of the sky. The discovery image by ATLAS is shown in the inset image, which is a zoomed in view of the location where 3I/ATLAS was discovered (red box).

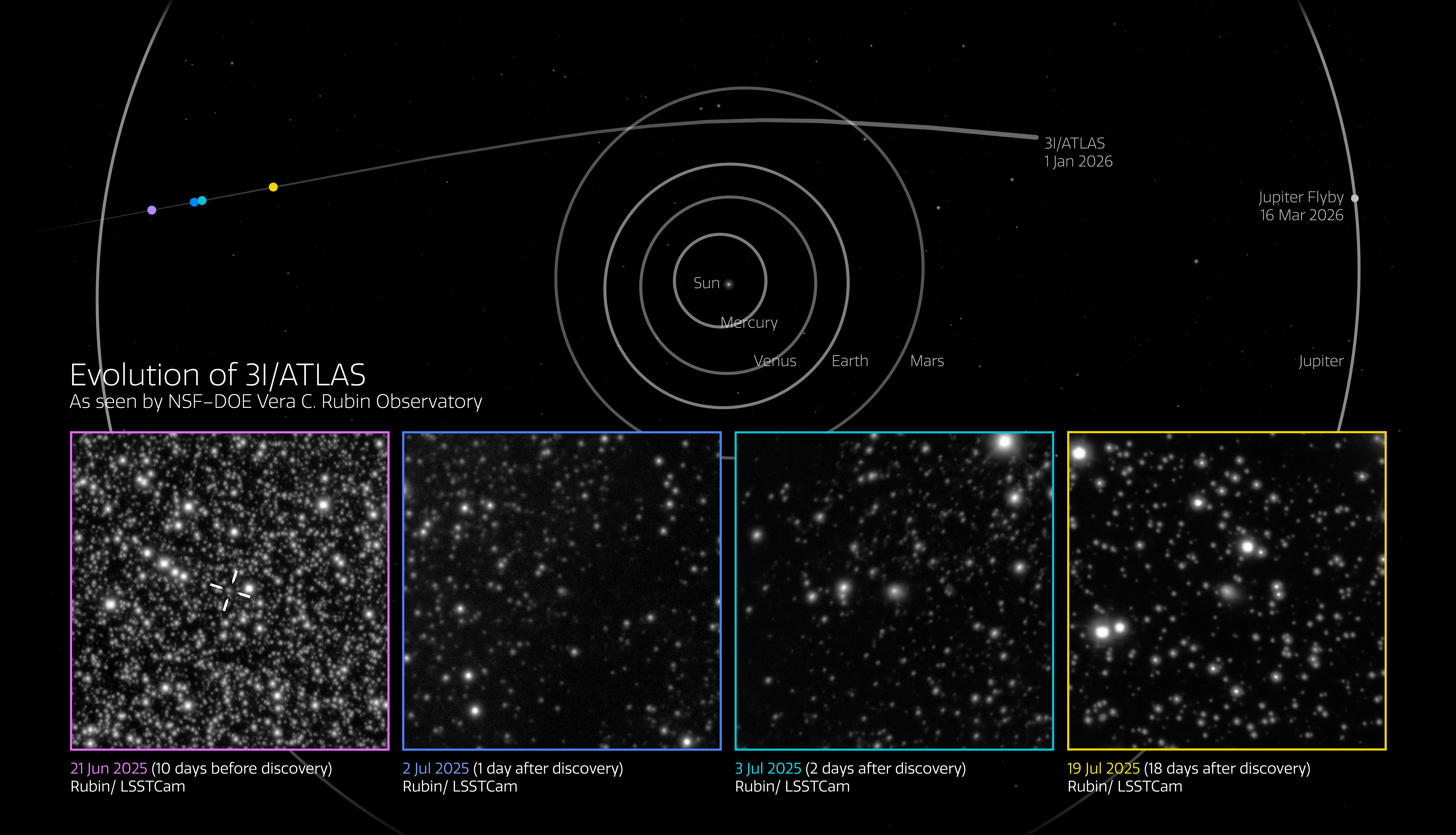
Evolution of 3I/ATLAS as seen by the Vera C. Rubin Observatory's LSSTCam during science validation observations. The four inset images show the comet on 21 June 2025 (ten days before discovery), 2 July, 3 July, and 19 July 2025. The upper portion shows the comet's trajectory through the inner Solar System, including the positions of the planets and the Jupiter flyby on 16 March 2026.

=== Further observations ===
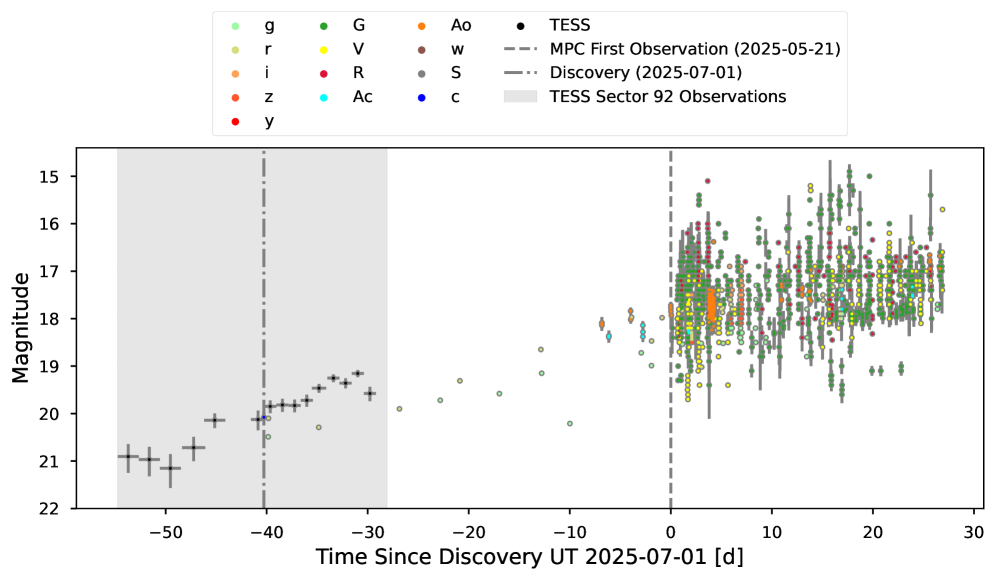
Light curve plot showing the measured brightness of 3I/ATLAS from May to August 2025, expressed in apparent magnitude. The brightness of 3I/ATLAS increases over time because it was approaching the Sun during this time interval. The gray shaded region represents the time when 3I/ATLAS was observed by the Transiting Exoplanet Survey Satellite (TESS).

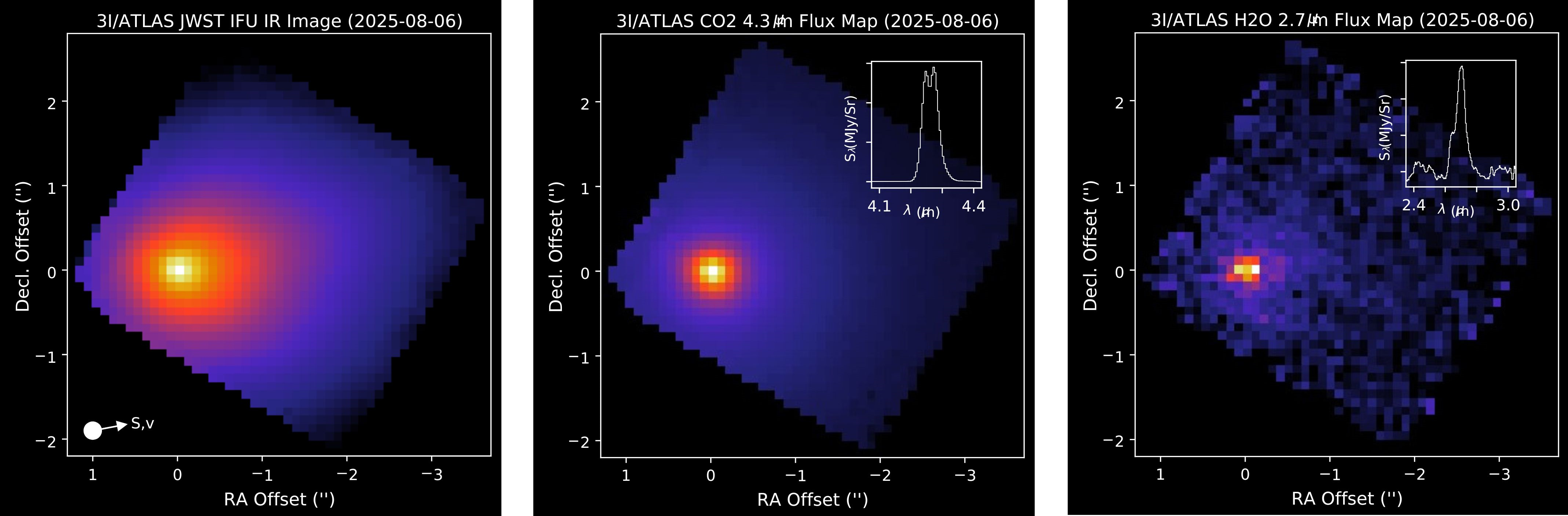
3I/ATLAS imaged by the James Webb Space Telescope's NIRSpec on 6 August 2025, showing an extended coma (left image). The two image panels on the right show how the brightness of 3I/ATLAS's coma changes depending on the wavelength of light, due to infrared light emission from the rotation and vibration of gas molecules in the coma. The middle image shows carbon dioxide emission and the right image shows water vapor emission in 3I/ATLAS.

Observations by David C. Jewitt and Jane Luu using the Nordic Optical Telescope on 2 July 2025 confirmed that 3I/ATLAS was "clearly active" with a diffuse appearance. Miguel R. Alarcón and a team of researchers of the IAC (Instituto de Astrofísica de Canarias) using Teide Observatory's Two-meter Twin Telescope also found cometary activity on the same date. Multiple different telescopes showed that the comet's coma had a reddish color indicative of dust, similar to that of the previous interstellar comet 2I/Borisov. A study published by Toni Santana-Ros and colleagues in August 2025 reported that 3I/ATLAS's coma had become redder throughout July 2025, indicating an evolving surface or coma composition as a result of 3I/ATLAS's increasing cometary activity.

On 6 July, additional observations were published, including Zwicky Transient Facility (I41) precoveries from several nights between 22 May and 21 June 2025. An even earlier precovery from 21 May 2025, made at Weizmann Astrophysical Observatory (M01), was published on 18 July 2025.

Polarimetric observations by the Very Large Telescope, Nordic Optical Telescope, and Rozhen Observatory from July and August 2025 revealed that 3I/ATLAS's coma exhibits an unusually high degree of negative polarization at small phase angles—meaning a large percent of the light reflected from 3I/ATLAS's coma have their oscillations oriented along the Sun-comet-observer plane. The negative polarization of 3I/ATLAS appears similar to those seen in trans-Neptunian objects, and suggests that its coma is made of a mixture of icy and dark material.

The newly commissioned Vera C. Rubin Observatory has serendipitously imaged 3I/ATLAS during its science validation observations from 21 June to 3 July 2025. These observations showed a slight increase in the comet's coma diameter and provided constraints on the comet's nucleus diameter. The Vera Rubin Observatory would have discovered 3I/ATLAS before the ATLAS survey if it had begun its science validation observations two weeks earlier. Rubin continued observing 3I/ATLAS until 20 July 2025, when the comet was no longer observable from Chile while the Sun was below the horizon; the observatory's 3200-megapixel LSST Camera collected nearly 100 exposures across this period, capturing the comet's nightly evolution as it approached the Sun. NASA's Transiting Exoplanet Survey Satellite (TESS) had also observed 3I/ATLAS before it was discovered, with observations from 7 May to 3 June 2025. These observations showed that the comet was already bright and active even when it was roughly 6.4 AU away from the Sun in May 2025, which indicates the comet's activity is likely caused by the sublimation of volatile ices other than water.

Water ice in 3I/ATLAS's coma was first reported on 20 July 2025, based on near-infrared spectroscopic observations by the Gemini South and NASA Infrared Telescope Facility on 5 and 14 July 2025. Ultraviolet observations by the Swift Observatory suggested the presence of water vapor and hydroxide ions in 3I/ATLAS's coma on 30 July 2025 and 1 August 2025. On 21 August 2025, astronomers of NASA's SPHEREx mission and the California Institute of Technology reported the detection of water ice and bright carbon dioxide gas emission in SPHEREx observations from mid-August 2025. On 22 August 2025, astronomers at Lowell Observatory reported the first tentative detection of cyanide emission in 3I/ATLAS. Spectroscopic observations by the Very Large Telescope on 21 August 2025 confirmed the presence of cyanide and also detected nickel in 3I/ATLAS's coma.

The Hubble Space Telescope took its first images of 3I/ATLAS on 21 July 2025, which revealed its coma in high detail and constrained its nucleus diameter to below 5.6 km (3.5 mi). The Hubble images were publicized by NASA and the European Space Agency on 7 August 2025. On 6 August 2025, JWST made its first observations of 3I/ATLAS using its NIRSpec instrument, and results were announced by NASA on 25 August 2025. In November 2025, Hubble performed ultraviolet spectroscopy on 3I/ATLAS to determine the composition of its gas emissions and sulfur-to-oxygen ratio, and the telescope will monitor the comet on its way out of the Solar System. The JWST had made a second set of observations of 3I/ATLAS in December 2025, after the comet's perihelion.

The comet was observed by the James Clerk Maxwell Telescope on 7 September 2025, when 3I/ATLAS was located 2.33 AU from the Sun, and found a hydrogen cyanide production rate of (1.5±0.5)×10^{25} molecules per second, while a week later, on September 14, the production rate had climbed to (4.5±1.9)×10^{25} molecules per second (2 kg/s). The cyanide coma on 15 September was about 180,000 kilometers across and was asymmetric, being elongated along the anti-solar direction. On the same date there was also a visible dust tail 50 arcseconds across, corresponding to about 100,000 kilometers. On 14 September, the comet had an apparent magnitude of 14.2.

The ExoMars TGO with its Colour and Stereo Surface Imaging System (CaSSIS) imaged the coma of 3I/ATLAS as the comet made its closest approach to Mars. The comet was around 50,000 times fainter than what the orbiter is used to viewing and imaged using 5-second exposures.

== Trajectory ==
Top view of 3I/ATLAS's trajectory (blue) through the Solar System, with orbits and positions of planets shown (click to start animation)

Tilted view of 3I/ATLAS's trajectory through the Solar System, with orbits and positions of planets shown (click to start animation)

3I/ATLAS follows an extremely hyperbolic trajectory past the Sun because it is moving too fast to be bound by the Sun's gravity. When 3I/ATLAS entered the Solar System, it was moving at a speed of 58 km/s (36 mi/s; 1.02 AU/month) relative to the Sun –this speed is the comet's hyperbolic excess velocity (v_{∞}). As 3I/ATLAS came closer to the Sun and was pulled in by the Sun's gravity, the comet sped up, and then once it began moving away, the comet slowed down as the Sun's gravity began pulling back on it. The comet will escape the Solar System nevertheless. 3I/ATLAS is moving far faster than the previous two interstellar objects 1I/ʻOumuamua (v_{∞}=26 km/s) and 2I/Borisov (v_{∞}=32 km/s).

The shape of 3I/ATLAS's trajectory is described by a parameter known as the orbital eccentricity. Whereas elliptical orbits have an eccentricity less than 1, hyperbolic orbits have an eccentricity greater than 1. For 3I/ATLAS, its trajectory has an extremely high orbital eccentricity of 6.141±0.00002. This extremely high eccentricity makes the trajectory of 3I/ATLAS appear relatively straight, rather than curved. 3I/ATLAS has the highest eccentricity of the three interstellar objects known to date, greater than 1I/ʻOumuamua's (e=1.2) and 2I/Borisov's (e=3.4).

3I/ATLAS passed closest to the Sun on 29 October 2025 at 11:45 UT. The comet's perihelion or closest distance to the Sun was 1.36 AU (203 million km; 126 million mi), which lies between the orbits of Earth and Mars. At perihelion, the comet was moving at its maximum speed of 68 km/s (42 mi/s) with respect to the Sun. (Note: The escape velocity from the Solar System depends mostly on how close you are to the Sun. Mars at 1.5 AU from the Sun has an orbital speed of only 24 km/s. The escape velocity from the Solar System at Mercury's orbit at 0.4 AU from the Sun is about 68 km/s, which is 3I/ATLAS's velocity at 1.36 AU from the Sun. The escape velocity from the surface of the Sun is 618 km/s.)

The trajectory of 3I/ATLAS is coincidentally closely aligned with the orbital planes of the Solar System's planets, or the ecliptic. Specifically, the comet's trajectory is tilted 175° (retrograde and inclined 5°) with respect to the ecliptic. The trajectory of 3I/ATLAS brought the comet close to the planets Venus, Mars, and Jupiter, but not Earth, and hence posed no threat. As 3I/ATLAS approached perihelion, it passed by Mars at a distance of 0.194 AU (29.0 million km; 18.0 million mi) on 3 October 2025. After perihelion, it passed 0.65 AU (97 million km; 60 million mi) from Venus on 3 November 2025. It passed 1.798 AU (269.0 million km; 167.1 million mi) from Earth on 19 December 2025, (Note: JPL #51 approaches Earth about 1 minute later and 0.00006 AU (9.0 thousand km; 5.6 thousand mi) farther than the pre-perihelion gravity-only solution JPL #26. Math: 1.797 557−1.797 495=0.000 06) when it was inside the asteroid belt and beyond the 4:1 Kirkwood gap. (Note: On 19 December 2025 the comet was 2.29 AU from the Sun and the 4:1 Kirkwood gap is located at 2.07 AU from the Sun.) The comet passed 0.358 AU (53.6 million km; 33.3 million mi) from Jupiter on 16 March 2026. (Note: At the close approach to Jupiter on 16 March 2026, the 3-sigma uncertainty in the object's position was ±600 km. 3I/ATLAS was 5.10 AU from the Sun and Jupiter was 5.24 AU from the Sun. Hill sphere at this time was 53.508 million km. $H = \left(5.238779 \times 149597870.7 \right) \times \left( \frac{1.267127641 \times 10^{8}}{3 \times 1.3271244 \times 10^{11}} \right)^{1/3}$) The comet will reach the inner Oort cloud (2000 AU from the Sun) around the year 2189, and will reach the outer edge of the Oort cloud (100000+ AU from the Sun) in about 8000 years. (Note: At 12.24 AU/year, it will take about 8137 years to exit the Solar System. Math: 100 000 / (58 km/s * 60 seconds * 60 minutes * 24 hours * 365.25 days / AU))

Closest approaches (with 3-sigma uncertainties)
Object	Date	Distance
Mars	2025-Oct-03 04:38 UT	0.193668 AU (28.9723 million km; 18.0026 million mi) (Note: On 3 October 2025, 3I/ATLAS was 1.66 AU from the Sun and Mars was 1.54 AU from the Sun.)
Mercury	2025-Oct-08 02:43 UT	1.161751 AU (173.7955 million km; 107.9915 million mi)
Sun	2025-Oct-29 11:45 UT	1.356449 AU (202.9219 million km; 126.0898 million mi)
Venus	2025-Nov-03 05:56 UT	0.649451 AU (97.1565 million km; 60.3702 million mi)
Earth	2025-Dec-19 06:02 UT	1.797542 AU (268.9085 million km; 167.0920 million mi)
Jupiter	2026-Mar-16 12:23 UT	0.358332 AU (53.6057 million km; 33.3090 million mi)
Eupheme	2026-Mar-17 10:42 UT	0.203592 AU (30.4569 million km; 18.9251 million mi) (Note: Eupheme with a 588 day orbit reached its farthest distance from Jupiter on 23 January 2026 and then 53 days later passes closest to 3I/ATLAS.)

== Observability ==
3I/ATLAS is a faint comet that does not get very close to Earth or the Sun and was not expected to get brighter than about apparent magnitude 11.5 as seen from Earth. Even at its peak brightness, the comet was not visible to an observer on Earth using the naked eye or smaller binoculars. 3I/ATLAS has been imaged by plate-solving smart telescopes with an aperture diameter of at least 3 to 4.5 in (7.6 to 11.4 cm) that see objects much fainter than visual observers do. During the Mars approach on 3 October 2025, 3I/ATLAS had a total magnitude (nucleus+coma) of 12 which made it about 120 times fainter than comet C/2025 A6 (Lemmon) and about 190 times fainter than comet C/2025 R2 (SWAN) at the time. By mid-November, the comet was on the borderline (between magnitudes 10 and 9) to be able to be detected in tripod-mounted 20x80 binoculars.

From July to late September 2025, 3I/ATLAS was observable from Earth after sunset. During the first half of July 2025, 3I/ATLAS was located in the constellation Sagittarius at an apparent magnitude of 17.5. By the second half of July 2025, 3I/ATLAS had moved to the constellation Ophiuchus and had brightened to apparent magnitude 16. During that time, the comet was located in a region of the sky where it was densely filled with stars, which made observations challenging as the comet could overlap background stars. The comet continued brightening as it approached the Sun, and throughout August 2025 it moved across the constellations Ophiuchus, Scorpius, and Libra. During September 2025, 3I/ATLAS remained in the constellation Libra as it brightens to around apparent magnitude 12–13. Even under a dark sky, to visually observe a point-like star (much less a diffuse comet) of magnitude 14 would require a telescope with an aperture of at least 200 mm (8 in), but given the diffuse nature of the object, a 300 mm (12 in) telescope might be needed. (Note: For example, comet 240P/NEAT at magnitude 13.9 required a 12-inch telescope to observe under a dark sky.)

As the comet approached the 29 October 2025 perihelion passage, the comet's solar elongation or angular separation from the Sun in the sky continued to decrease, which narrowed down its visibility to only equatorial regions of Earth just after sunset. The comet was less than 30 degrees from the Sun from 1 October 2025 to 9 November 2025. The reason for 3I/ATLAS's decreasing solar elongation before perihelion is because the comet came to solar conjunction (on the opposite side of the Sun from Earth) on 21 October 2025, 8 days before perihelion. This means 3I/ATLAS appeared behind the Sun from Earth during the comet's perihelion, so the comet was not observable from Earth during this time. The comet passed close to Mars during that month and Mars orbiters may be able to observe the comet near perihelion. The faint comet was observable from 18 to 24 October with the GOES-19 weather satellite that can see objects down to magnitude 12. During the same period it was also observed by Solar and Heliospheric Observatory and the Polarimeter to Unify the Corona and Heliosphere satellites.

After 3I/ATLAS passed perihelion, it became visible in the sky again just before sunrise in November 2025. Further observations and spectrometry was conducted by Physical Research Laboratory scientists from the 1.2m infra-red telescope on Mount Abu in mid-November 2025. The comet grew dimmer and its solar elongation increased as it moved away from the Sun. During December 2025, the comet will move through the constellations Virgo and Leo and its brightness is expected to become dimmer than apparent magnitude 12.

On 11 December 2025, the comet passed less than two degrees from the half Moon. By 11 December 2025, the comet went more than 90 degrees from the Sun and became observable at midnight. But opposition, when the comet was up all night at an elongation of 177.6 degrees, did not occur until 22 January 2026, when the comet was predicted to be much fainter.

The apparent path of 3I/ATLAS in Earth's sky from 2024 to 2026. The comet's positions over 10-day intervals are marked with red points and are labeled with their respective dates in yellow. The path begins in the constellation Sagittarius on the left and ends in Gemini on the right. The apparent loops at the path's ends are caused by parallax due to Earth's orbital motion around the Sun.

== Origin and age ==
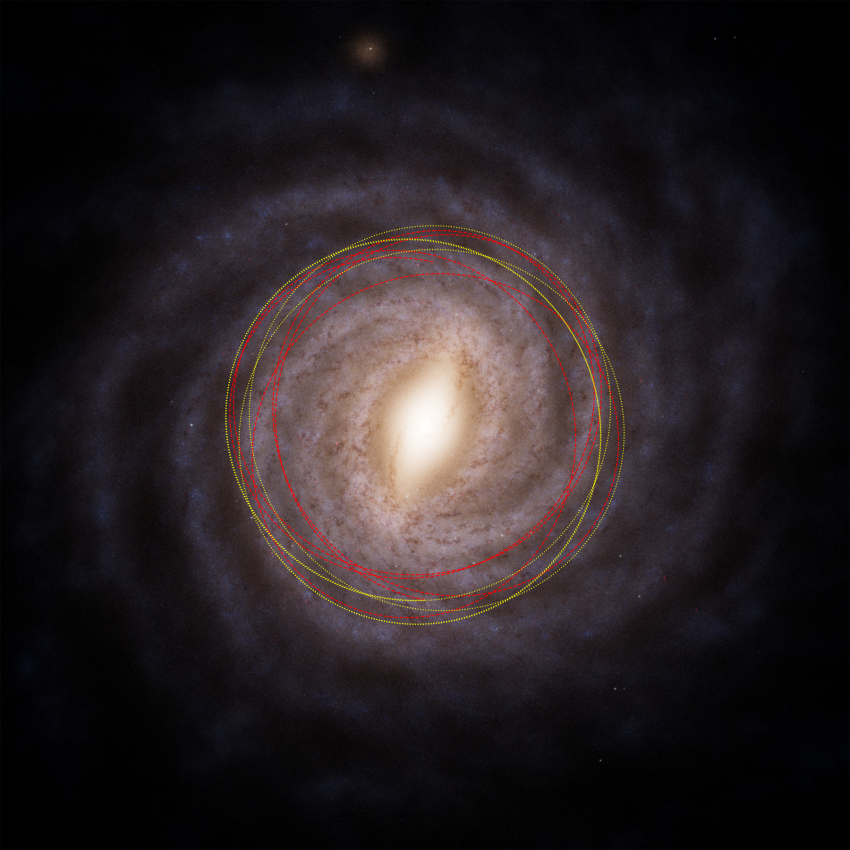
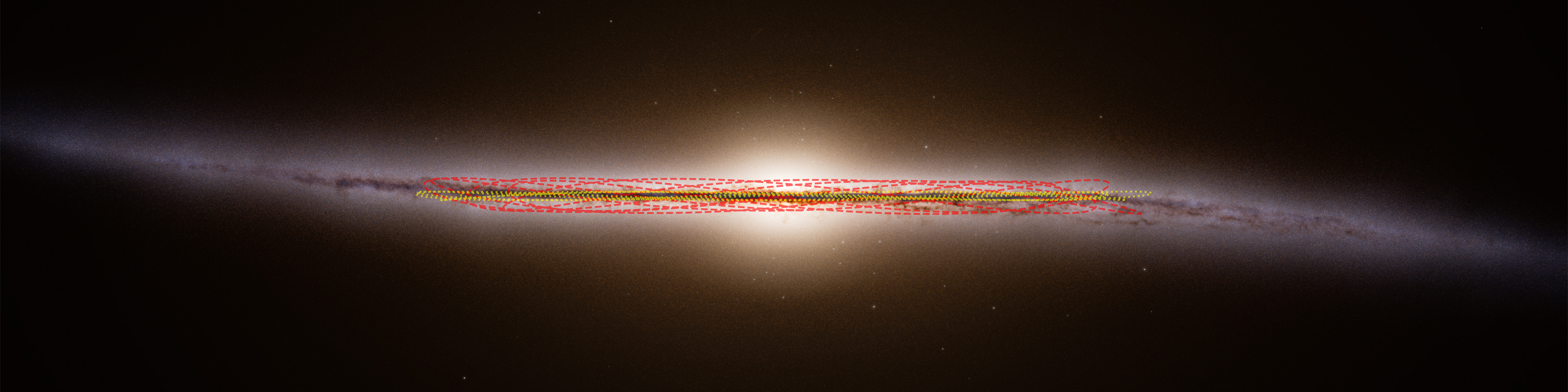
Diagrams illustrating the orbits of the Sun (yellow) and 3I/ATLAS (red) within the Milky Way galaxy. 3I/ATLAS has a tilted orbit that brings it farther above and below the galactic plane than the Sun, as shown by the side view (bottom image).

3I/ATLAS is recognized as an interstellar object because of its extremely hyperbolic path and very high speed relative to the Solar System. 3I/ATLAS did not pass close enough to any of the Solar System's planets to have gained its speed, so it could not have originated from the Solar System. Tracing the path of 3I/ATLAS in the sky shows that the comet originated from interstellar space in the direction of the constellation Sagittarius, near the Milky Way's Galactic Center.

Unlike the previous two interstellar objects, 3I/ATLAS originated from the southern celestial hemisphere in a direction opposite to the solar apex in the north, which is the direction of the Sun's movement relative to local stars. The southern origin of 3I/ATLAS was unexpected because astronomers initially predicted that more interstellar objects should come from the solar apex, and that telescopes should have a more difficult time discovering southern-origin interstellar objects. It is possible that either 3I/ATLAS is a rare discovery, or southern-origin interstellar objects may be more common than initially thought.

The origin of 3I/ATLAS can be deduced by breaking down its hyperbolic excess velocity into radial (U), transverse (V), and vertical (W) velocity components in the galactic coordinate system. (Note: In the galactic coordinate system, U positive toward the direction of the Galactic Center, V positive toward the direction of galactic rotation, and W positive toward the direction of the North Galactic Pole.) When 3I/ATLAS arrived to the Solar System, it was moving away from the Galactic Center with a velocity of U=−51.0 km/s with respect to the Sun (Note: The Sun is also moving away from the Galactic Center and thus has a negative U velocity component, although it is slower than that of 3I/ATLAS.) and was moving upward through the galactic plane with a velocity of W=+18.5 km/s with respect to the Sun. The vertical W velocity of 3I/ATLAS is quite high compared to those of nearby stars and other interstellar objects, which means that the comet follows a tilted orbit around the Milky Way and thus belongs to either the thin disk or thick disk populations. The thick disk mainly consists of older stars whose compositions have lower levels of heavy elements than the Sun.

A July 2025 study led by Matthew Hopkins and collaborators estimated with 68 percent confidence that 3I/ATLAS is between 7.6 and 14 billion years old, based on the typical ages of stars in the thick disk. This means that 3I/ATLAS could be older than the Solar System (which is 4.6 billion years old) and may well be the oldest comet yet seen. An independent analysis by Aster Taylor and Darryl Seligman in July 2025 estimated that 3I/ATLAS should be 3 to 11 billion years old, in broad agreement with Hopkins et al.'s estimate.

=== Parent star and formation ===
3I/ATLAS cannot be traced back to its original parent star because the comet has been traveling around the Milky Way for billions of years, which is enough time for it to be mixed around with other stars. It is likely that 3I/ATLAS's speed has undergone changes during its journey through interstellar space, via gravity assists from close encounters with stars and nebulae. A September 2025 study by Yiyang Guo and collaborators found that 3I/ATLAS may have passed within 1 parsec (3.3 light-years) of 25 known stars in the past 10 million years.

Although the parent star of 3I/ATLAS is unknown, the properties and environment of its parent star can be inferred from the comet's composition and dynamical membership in the Galactic disk. If it is a member of the thick disk, the parent star of 3I/ATLAS could be a low-metallicity star with a heavy element abundance of at least 40 percent of the Sun's. 3I/ATLAS is presumed to have formed within a protoplanetary disk of gas and dust, which surrounded the parent star when it was young. Observations by JWST and SPHEREx have shown that 3I/ATLAS is rich in carbon dioxide (CO_{2}), which suggests that it formed far from its parent star, beyond the CO_{2} frost line where temperatures are cold enough for CO_{2} to condense into solid. At some point after its formation, 3I/ATLAS was gravitationally flung out of its parent star system, either by a close encounter with a giant planet or a star.

== Physical characteristics ==
=== Cometary activity ===
==== Coma ====
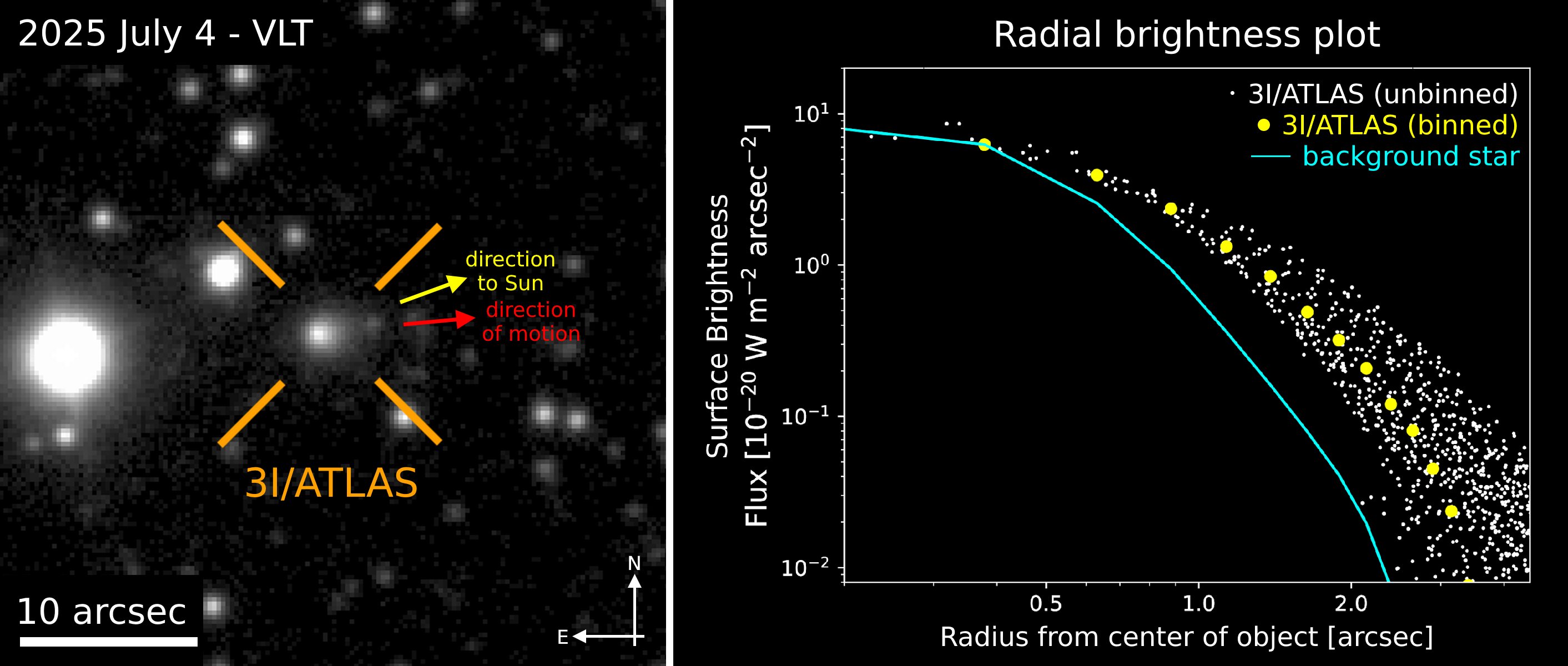
Left panel: 3I/ATLAS imaged by the Very Large Telescope on 4 July 2025, showing the comet's fuzzy appearance relative to background stars around it. The comet appears elongated toward the Sun due to its Sun-facing plume. Right panel: The fuzzy appearance of 3I/ATLAS can be seen in its radial brightness profile, which plots the surface brightness in relation to radius. 3I/ATLAS's surface brightness extends to a greater radius compared to a background star of the same peak brightness, so the comet must have a coma.

3I/ATLAS appears distinctly fuzzier than stars in telescope images, which means that the solid body or nucleus of 3I/ATLAS is surrounded by a coma, a cloud of gas and icy dust ejected from the comet's outgassing surface. The Sun is responsible for the comet's activity because it heats up the comet's nucleus to sublimate its volatile ices into gas, which ejects dust from the comet's surface and escapes into space. Dust particles in the coma of 3I/ATLAS eventually trail away from the nucleus (with smaller particles blown away by solar radiation pressure), leading to the formation of a dust tail behind the comet.

As 3I/ATLAS came closer to the Sun, it became more active as its volatile ices heated up more and began sublimating faster; this could potentially have led to outbursts, where the comet suddenly ejects a large amount of dust and brightens, or even fragmentation events, where the comet's nucleus breaks into pieces like what happened with the previous interstellar comet 2I/Borisov. As of August 2025, observations had not detected any outbursts in 3I/ATLAS; its brightness and activity level appear to be steady. Observations by NASA's Transiting Exoplanet Survey Satellite (TESS) show that 3I/ATLAS may have been exhibiting cometary activity as early as 7 May 2025 (two months before its discovery), when it was roughly 6.4 AU away from the Sun.

The coma of 3I/ATLAS appears slightly elliptical and spans up to 26,400 by 24,700 km (16,400 by 15,300 mi) in diameter (about twice the diameter of Earth), (Note: Earth's mean diameter (averaged between poles and equator) is roughly 12,756 km (7,926 mi) (see mean radius of Earth). Multiplying that by 2 gives 25,512 km (15,852 mi).) according to high-resolution images from the 10.4-meter (34 ft) Gran Telescopio Canarias on 2 July 2025. Observations by NASA's SPHEREx mission from mid-August 2025 showed that 3I/ATLAS has a more extensive carbon dioxide gas coma that spans at least 348,000 km (216,000 mi) in radius, although it is only visible in near-infrared. Because the comet is far away from Earth, its coma appears small in the sky; observations from July 2025 have measured an angular diameter of about 2 arcseconds for the most visible part of the coma (the coma's full width at half maximum) and 10 arcseconds for the full extent of the coma. As 3I/ATLAS approaches the Sun and becomes more active, the size and density of its coma continued to grow. Pre-discovery observations by the Vera C. Rubin Observatory showed that the diameter of 3I/ATLAS's coma had grown from 13,040 km (8,100 mi) on 21 June 2025 to 18,760 km (11,660 mi) on 2 July 2025.

Spectroscopic and imaging observations indicate that the coma of 3I/ATLAS has a reddish color and is mainly made of relatively large dust grains that are several micrometers (μm) in radius. The reddish color of 3I/ATLAS is similar to the colors of D-type asteroids, Solar System comets, and the interstellar comet 2I/Borisov, and is likely caused by irradiated organic compounds such as tholins in the comet's coma. Within the coma of 3I/ATLAS, small dust grains with 1 μm radii are ejected from the nucleus at fast speeds of 22 m/s, whereas large dust grains with 100 μm radii are ejected at slower speeds of about 2 m/s. Based on the shape and brightness of 3I/ATLAS's coma in Hubble Space Telescope images from July 2025, it is estimated that the comet was ejecting 6 kg (13 lb) of small dust particles per second and 60 kg (130 lb) of large dust particles per second during that month. The dust ejection rate of 3I/ATLAS is similar to that of 2I/Borisov when it was approaching the Solar System, but it is lower than the typical rates for distant Jupiter-family comets.

The ESA with data from the JANUS and JUICE spacecraft shows that 3I has a distinct coma, although the spacecraft was 60 million kilometers away at its closest Jupiter approach on 16 March 2026. Along with the two tails; dust tail and ion tail, this further backs up that 3I is an ordinary comet.

==== Sun-facing plume ====
During July and August 2025, the coma of 3I/ATLAS appeared to be elongated westward in the sky—in a direction toward the Sun and toward the comet's direction of motion rather than away. This Sun-facing feature is not a tail (contrary to initial reports), but is rather a dust plume that is being emitted from the heated, sunlit surface of 3I/ATLAS's nucleus, where ice sublimation occurs faster and thus ejects more dust. The Sun-facing elongation of 3I/ATLAS's coma resembles those of other distant comets like C/2014 UN_{271} (Bernardinelli–Bernstein), which have been known to preferentially eject dust from the sunlit side of their surfaces.

By late August 2025, the coma of 3I/ATLAS no longer appeared elongated toward the Sun and the comet had developed an anti-solar tail. However, the Sun-facing plume is still present, as telescope images from 26 August 2025 showed that the inner coma of 3I/ATLAS (within 5 arcseconds from the nucleus) appeared fan-shaped and slightly brighter on the Sun-facing side.

==== Tail ====
Hubble images from July 2025 first showed that 3I/ATLAS had a very faint and broad tail pointing eastward, in a direction away from the Sun. A tail pointing away from the Sun is a common cometary feature that is formed when small dust particles are blown away by solar radiation pressure. The broad appearance of this tail suggests that small dust particles were ejected from 3I/ATLAS's surface at high speeds. The anti-solar tail of 3I/ATLAS was thought to be pointed directly away from Earth in July 2025, which would have made it foreshortened and mostly hidden behind 3I/ATLAS's coma. By the end of August 2025, observations by the 8.2-meter Gemini South telescope showed that the anti-solar tail of 3I/ATLAS had become more visible and had grown to 30 arcseconds in angular length or roughly 56,000 km (35,000 mi). (Note: On 27.99 August 2025 the comet was 2.59 AU from Earth so the comet tail was roughly 56,000 km (35,000 mi) long. Math: 2.59 AU * (30/206265) = 56353 km) The tail of 3I/ATLAS is expected to become more obvious as the comet approaches perihelion with changing viewing geometry and increasing cometary activity. As of 15 September, 3I/ATLAS had a visible dust tail length of 50 arcseconds (~100,000 km). Post-perihelion, the tail of the comet was recovered by Michael Jäger on 8 November 2025.

The ESA in April 2026 reported that the gas/tail of 3I/ATLAS stretches to the extent of 5 million kilometers away from the nucleus. These gas and dust emissions are relatively common in comets, and their dust tails can even extend to about 10 million kilometers from the nucleus.

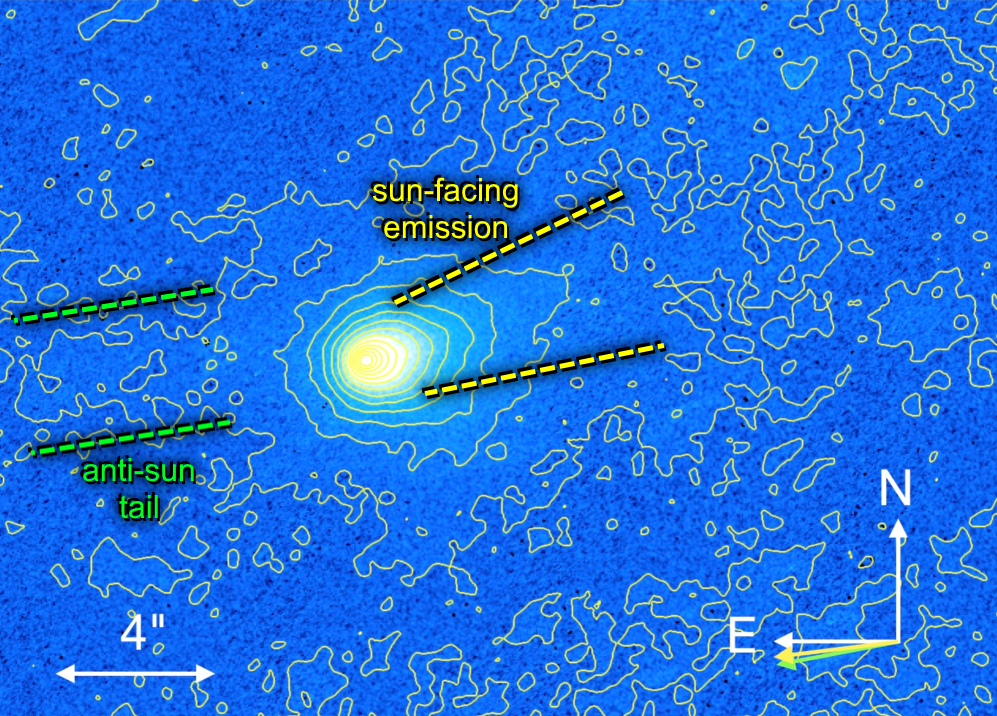
3I/ATLAS imaged by the Hubble Space Telescope on 21 July 2025, showing its Sun-facing plume pointing to the right. The image is contour mapped to highlight faint features, such as the anti-solar tail on the left (east).

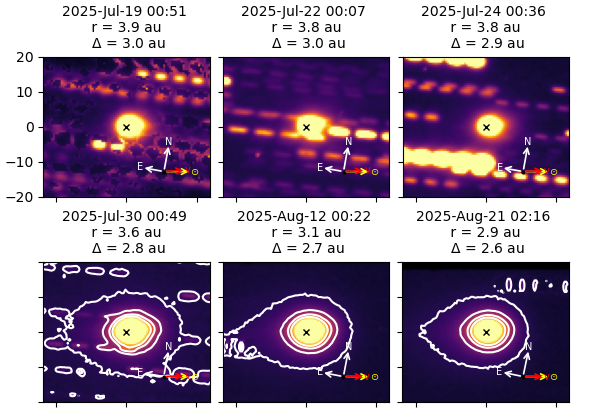
Images of 3I/ATLAS by the Very Large Telescope from July and August 2025, showing changes in its coma shape over time. The comet's Sun-facing plume (pointing right) is visible in all images. During August 2025 (bottom row), 3I/ATLAS begins to develop an anti-solar tail pointing left.

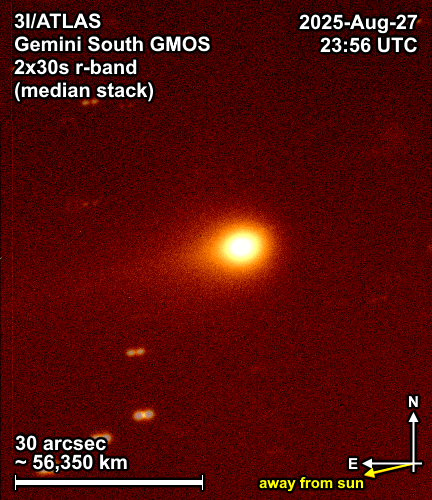
3I/ATLAS photographed by the Gemini South telescope on 27 August 2025, revealing a tail pointed away from the Sun

=== Size and mass ===
High-resolution images by the Hubble Space Telescope from July 2025 indicate that the diameter of 3I/ATLAS's nucleus is between 0.32 and 5.6 km (0.2 and 3.5 mi). There is a large uncertainty in the estimated diameter of 3I/ATLAS's nucleus because it is surrounded by a coma of reflective dust, which makes the nucleus appear brighter and larger than it actually is. For example, early studies from July 2025 gave diameter estimates that were as high as 10 to 20 km (6.2 to 12.4 mi), although astronomers were well aware that the nucleus of 3I/ATLAS should be much smaller. While the exact brightness of the coma is unknown, Hubble images show that the coma's brightness must account for a large fraction of the nucleus's apparent brightness, so the actual diameter of 3I/ATLAS's nucleus should be at the lower end of the estimated range. The estimated dust loss rate of 3I/ATLAS suggests that its nucleus is likely less than a kilometer in diameter, like 2I/Borisov.

Observations by various interplanetary spacecraft have shown that 3I/ATLAS experienced significant non-gravitational acceleration that peaked up to (89.3±4.6)×10^{−9} AU/day^{2} one month before perihelion. If this non-gravitational acceleration is purely caused by outgassing, it would suggest that 3I/ATLAS's nucleus has a mass of roughly 4.4×10^{10} kg. If 3I/ATLAS has a typical comet nucleus density of 200–600 kg/m^{3}, then this mass would correspond to a nucleus diameter between 0.520 and 0.748 km (0.3 and 0.5 mi), which is in agreement with estimates from Hubble imaging.

=== Composition and gas emissions ===
Near-infrared spectroscopy by JWST in August 2025 has shown that the coma of 3I/ATLAS is unusually rich in carbon dioxide (CO_{2}) gas, with small amounts of water ice, water vapor, carbon monoxide (CO) gas, and carbonyl sulfide (OCS) gas. The JWST has also revealed the presence of "heavy" CO_{2} containing the isotope carbon-13 (^{13}C) in 3I/ATLAS's coma, although partial obscuration by dust and other gases makes it difficult to quantify the abundance of ^{13}C relative to the more common isotope ^{12}C. Spectroscopic observations by the SPHEREx space observatory agree that 3I/ATLAS contains high amounts of CO_{2} in its coma, although SPHEREx did not have the sensitivity to detect water vapor and CO.

From the August 2025 JWST observations, it is estimated that 3I/ATLAS's nucleus was emitting 129 ± 1 kg (284.4 ± 2.2 lb) of CO_{2} per second, (Note: Carbon dioxide or CO_{2} has a molar mass of 44.009 grams/mole, where 1 mole is equivalent to 6.022×10^{23} molecules (Avogadro's number). The "whole-coma equivalent" CO_{2} emission rate of (1.76±0.02)×10^{27} CO_{2} molecules/second given in Cordiner et al. (2025) can be divided by 6.022×10^{23} molecules/mole to give ≈2923 moles of CO_{2}/second. Dividing the moles of CO_{2} by the molar mass of CO_{2} gives a CO_{2} mass emission rate of ≈1.286×10^{4} grams/second, or ≈128.6 kilograms/second when multiplying by 1 kilogram/1000 gram. Rounding the result down to the appropriate number of significant figures gives ≈129 kilograms/second. The uncertainty is calculated via propagation of error.) 6.6 ± 0.2 kg (14.6 ± 0.4 lb) of water per second, (Note: Water or H_{2}O has a molar mass of 18.015 grams/mole, where 1 mole is equivalent to 6.022×10^{23} molecules (Avogadro's number). The "whole-coma equivalent" H_{2}O emission rate of (2.19±0.08)×10^{26} H_{2}O molecules/second given in Cordiner et al. (2025) can be divided by 6.022×10^{23} molecules/mole to give ≈363.7 moles of H_{2}O/second. Dividing the moles of H_{2}O by the molar mass of H_{2}O gives a H_{2}O mass emission rate of ≈6.552×10^{3} grams/second, or ≈6.552 kilograms/second when multiplying by 1 kilogram/1000 gram. Rounding the result down to the appropriate number of significant figures gives ≈6.55 kilograms/second. The uncertainty is calculated via propagation of error.) 14.0 ± 0.9 kg (30.9 ± 2.0 lb) of CO per second, (Note: Carbon monoxide or CO has a molar mass of 28.010 grams/mole, where 1 mole is equivalent to 6.022×10^{23} molecules (Avogadro's number). The "whole-coma equivalent" CO emission rate of (3.0±0.2)×10^{26} CO molecules/second given in Cordiner et al. (2025) can be divided by 6.022×10^{23} molecules/mole to give ≈498.2 moles of CO/second. Dividing the moles of CO by the molar mass of CO gives a CO mass emission rate of ≈1.395×10^{4} grams/second, or ≈13.95 kilograms/second when multiplying by 1 kilogram/1000 gram. Rounding the result down to the appropriate number of significant figures gives ≈14.0 kilograms/second. The uncertainty is calculated via propagation of error.) and 0.43 ± 0.09 kg (0.95 ± 0.20 lb) of OCS per second. (Note: Carbonyl sulfide or OCS has a molar mass of 60.075 grams/mole, where 1 mole is equivalent to 6.022×10^{23} molecules (Avogadro's number). The "whole-coma equivalent" CO emission rate of (4.3±0.9)×10^{24} OCS molecules/second given in Cordiner et al. (2025) can be divided by 6.022×10^{23} molecules/mole to give ≈7.140 moles of OCS/second. Dividing the moles of OCS by the molar mass of OCS gives a OCS mass emission rate of ≈429.0 grams/second, or ≈0.4290 kilograms/second when multiplying by 1 kilogram/1000 gram. Rounding the result down to the appropriate number of significant figures gives ≈0.43 kilograms/second. The uncertainty is calculated via propagation of error.) Analysis of absorption features in JWST's spectrum of 3I/ATLAS suggests that the water ice in the comet's coma consists of fine grains smaller than 1 micrometer in size. The water ice in 3I/ATLAS is likely amorphous, although crystalline water ice cannot be ruled out. A tentative detection of water vapor and hydroxyl radicals (OH) by the Swift Observatory on 31 July and 1 August 2025 suggested that the water ice grains in 3I/ATLAS's coma are sublimating beyond the nucleus, likely at a distance between 4,000 and 10,000 km (2,500 and 6,200 mi) from the nucleus. The water ice grains were most likely ejected from the comet's nucleus by outgassing of volatile substances such as CO_{2} and CO, rather than water ice sublimation.

Mid-infared spectroscopy by JWST in December 2025 has added a novel detection of methane to the host of observed volatiles. The December 2025 re-visit of 3I/ATLAS shows an evolving production rate for the volatile species, both due to temporal evolution and a different heliocentric distance relative to the August observations.

Ultraviolet spectroscopy by telescopes on Earth have additionally detected cyanide (CN) gas and atomic nickel (Ni I) vapor in the coma of 3I/ATLAS. The emission of atomic nickel is not unusual; it has been seen in various comets, including the interstellar comet 2I/Borisov. However, no iron (Fe I) vapor was detected in 3I/ATLAS, which is unusual because nickel and iron are typically found in roughly equal amounts when outgassing from comets. Nickel emission in 3I/ATLAS was first detected by the Very Large Telescope (VLT) on 20 July 2025, and cyanide emission was first detected by the VLT later on 14 August 2025. Throughout July to August 2025, the VLT observed a "rapid and steady" increase in the concentration of nickel and cyanide in 3I/ATLAS's coma, due to the comet's increasing activity during its approach to the Sun (from 4.4 to 2.85 AU). It is estimated that 3I/ATLAS was emitting 4.6 ± 0.7 g (0.16 ± 0.02 oz) of nickel per second (Note: Atomic nickel (Ni) has an average molar mass of 58.693 grams/mole, where 1 mole is equivalent to 6.022×10^{23} molecules (Avogadro's number). Rahatgaonkar et al. (2025) give a logarithmic emission rate of 22.67±0.07, which can be plugged in as an exponent of 10 to give the actual Ni emission rate of 10^{22.67} ≈ 3.981×10^{22} Ni atoms/second. The actual Ni emission rate can then be divided by 6.022×10^{23} molecules/mole to give ≈0.0661 moles of Ni/second. Dividing the moles of Ni by the molar mass of Ni gives a Ni mass emission rate of ≈4.559 grams/second. Rounding the result down to the appropriate number of significant figures gives ≈4.6 grams/second. The uncertainty is calculated via propagation of error.) and 17.6 ± 2.0 g (0.62 ± 0.07 oz) of cyanide per second by the time the VLT observations ended on 21 August 2025. (Note: Cyanide or CN has a molar mass of 26.018 grams/mole, where 1 mole is equivalent to 6.022×10^{23} molecules (Avogadro's number). Rahatgaonkar et al. (2025) give a logarithmic emission rate of 23.61±0.05, which can be plugged in as an exponent of 10 to give the actual CN emission rate of 10^{23.61} ≈ 4.571×10^{23} CN molecules/second. The actual CN emission rate can then be divided by 6.022×10^{23} molecules/mole to give ≈0.7590 moles of CN/second. Dividing the moles of CN by the molar mass of CN gives a CN mass emission rate of ≈17.60 grams/second. Rounding the result down to the appropriate number of significant figures gives ≈17.6 grams/second. The uncertainty is calculated via propagation of error.) Although it is unusual that nickel emission was detected before cyanide, the concentrations of nickel and cyanide in 3I/ATLAS are generally similar to those seen in other Solar System comets observed at similar distances from the Sun. It is uncertain how nickel vapor is released from 3I/ATLAS; Rohan Rahatgaonkar and colleagues who analyzed the VLT observations proposed that there are several possible processes involving the chemical decomposition of nickel-containing organic compounds (e.g. nickel tetracarbonyl) via space weathering. The amount of nickel observed in 3I/ATLAS is still consistent with earlier predictions that it should have a metal-poor composition.

During July to August 2025, the VLT did not detect any signs of atomic oxygen [O I], dicarbon (C_{2}), tricarbon (C_{3}), and amino radicals (NH_{2}) in the coma of 3I/ATLAS. Likewise, observations by the MDM Observatory did not detect C_{2} and C_{3} in the coma of 3I/ATLAS during August 2025, which suggests that the comet is highly depleted in carbon chain compounds. The upper limit to the comet's C_{2}-to-CN ratio suggests that 3I/ATLAS is one of the most carbon chain-depleted comets ever known.

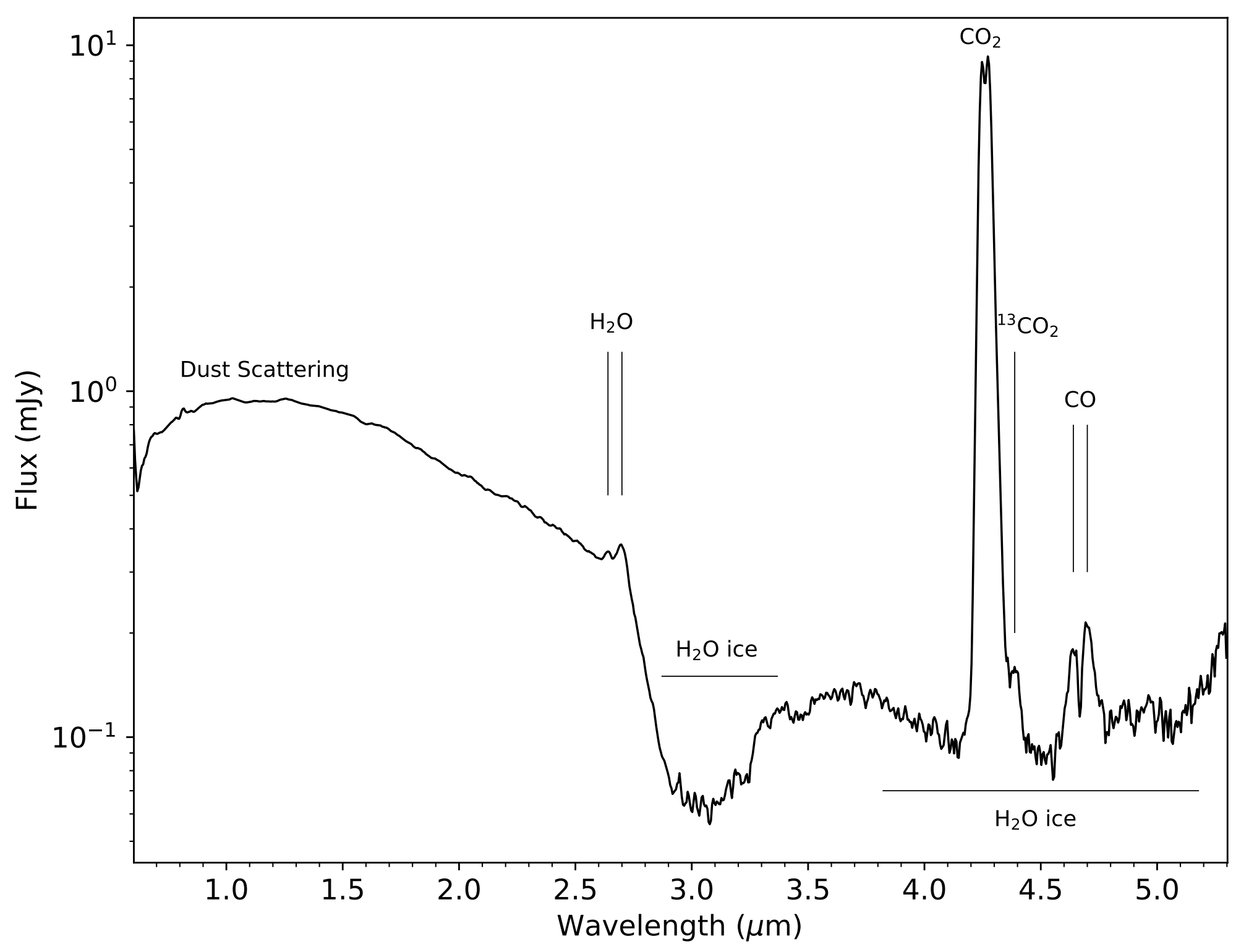
The near-infrared spectrum of 3I/ATLAS as measured by the JWST's NIRSpec instrument on 6 August 2025. The spectrum plots the brightness of 3I/ATLAS (vertical axis) over wavelength of light (horizontal axis). The gases that make up 3I/ATLAS (H_{2}O, CO_{2}, and CO) can be seen as emission peaks, which are labeled with their respective names.

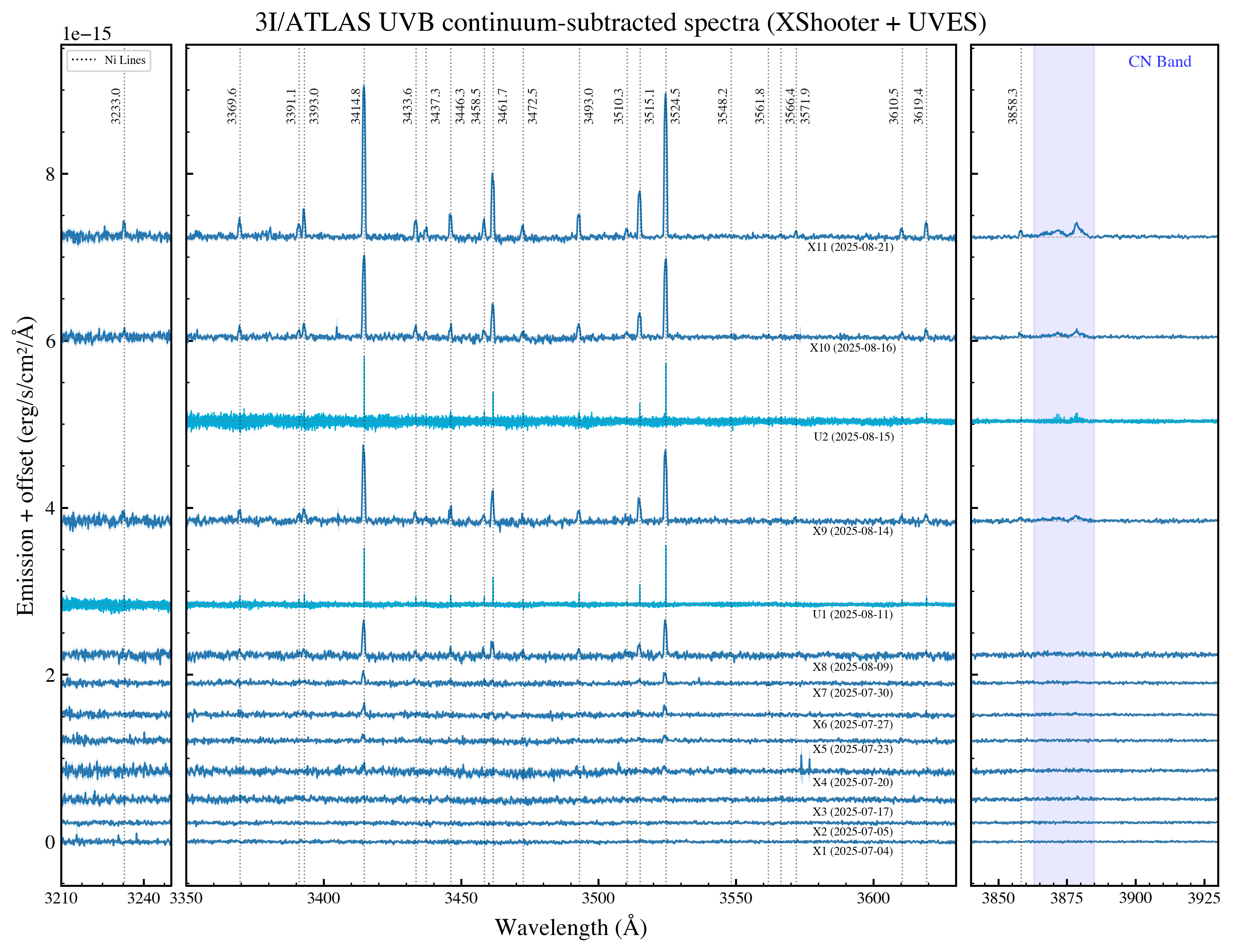
Ultraviolet spectrum of 3I/ATLAS over time, as measured by the Very Large Telescope from 4 July (below) to 21 August 2025 (top). The left and middle panels show emission lines caused by atomic nickel (Ni I), and the right panel shows weak emission lines caused by cyanide (CN) gas. These emission lines grew more obvious over time because 3I/ATLAS was becoming more active during its approach to the Sun.

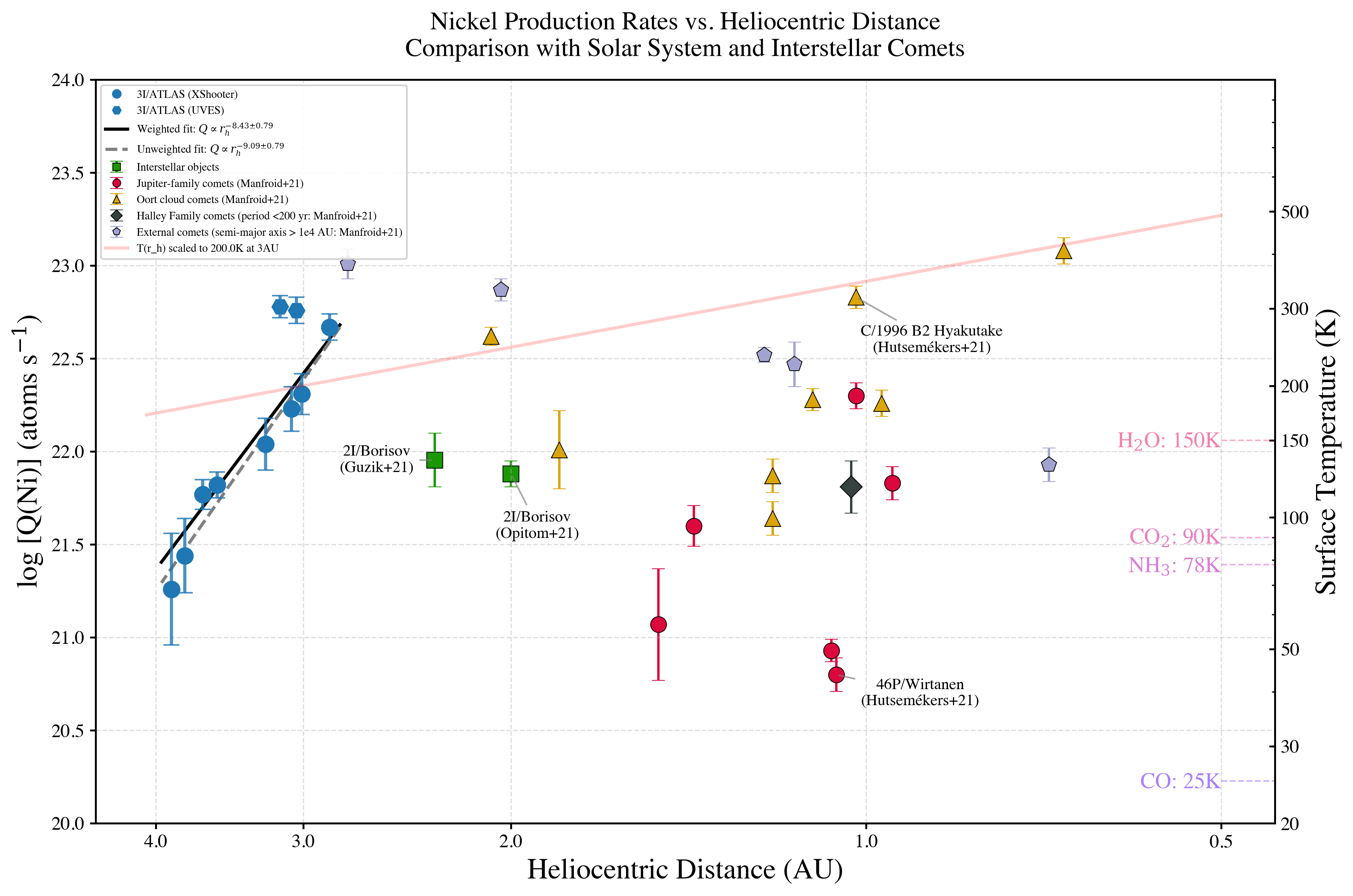
Plot showing nickel emission rates of known comets (vertical axis) versus distance from the Sun (horizontal axis). 3I/ATLAS (blue) is not the only interstellar comet known to emit nickel, as 2I/Borisov (green) is shown here as well. The nickel emission rate in 3I/ATLAS has been observed to increase at closer distances from the Sun.

==== Carbon dioxide abundance ====
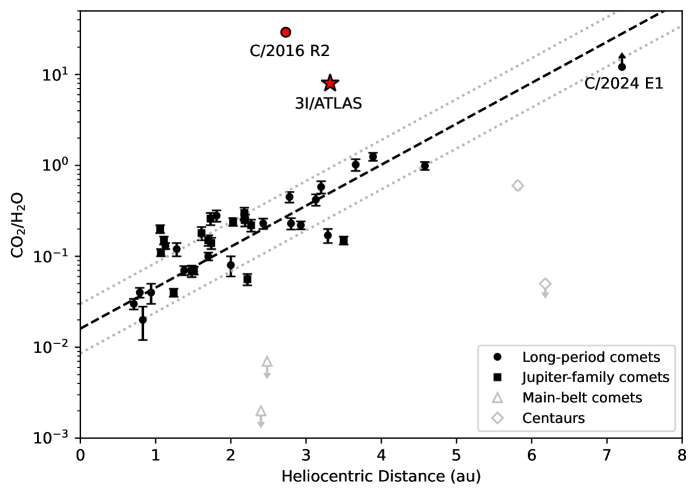
Plot showing the carbon dioxide-to-water (CO_{2}/H_{2}O) mixing ratios of known comets (vertical axis) with distance from the Sun (horizontal axis). The dashed diagonal line highlights the trend of increasing CO_{2}/H_{2}O mixing ratio with distance from the Sun. The two comets with anomalously high CO_{2}/H_{2}O mixing ratios are labeled with red points: 3I/ATLAS (star) and C/2016 R2 (PanSTARRS) (circle).

Within the coma of 3I/ATLAS, the mixing ratio of CO_{2} relative to water is 8.0±1.0—this is one of the highest CO_{2} abundances seen in a comet, especially at its distance from the Sun (3.32 AU) when it was first observed by JWST. Whereas Solar System comets generally follow a trend of increasing CO_{2}-to-water mixing ratio with distance from the Sun (due to CO_{2} sublimating more than water at closer distances to the Sun), only 3I/ATLAS and the unusual Oort cloud comet C/2016 R2 (PanSTARRS) are known to break this trend with exceptionally high CO_{2}-to-water mixing ratios. On the other hand, the coma of 3I/ATLAS has a more typical CO-to-water mixing ratio of 1.4±0.2, resembling other Solar System comets including the interstellar comet 2I/Borisov.

The reason for the high abundance of CO_{2} in 3I/ATLAS's coma is uncertain; this could either mean that the comet has a CO_{2}-rich nucleus or there is some mechanism limiting the sublimation of water from its nucleus. A team of NASA researchers led by Martin A. Cordiner have hypothesized that if 3I/ATLAS has a CO_{2}-rich nucleus, the comet may have either been exposed to high amounts of radiation or may have formed close to the CO_{2} frost line in its parent star's protoplanetary disk. Alternatively, if 3I/ATLAS contains more water than suggested by JWST, 3I/ATLAS could have an unusually thick, insulating crust hiding water ice underneath. Further observations by the JWST, especially when 3I/ATLAS becomes more active, will be needed to determine which scenario is more likely.

In April 2026, the ESA released some more information about this interstellar comet. They have reported that 3I/ATLAS was emitting "70 Olympic Swimming Pools" worth of water vapor per day. More interesting is that they also reported that most of this water vapor was being emitted towards the sun. More reports of 3I/ATLAS will be released in due time once they gather more information from JUICE.

==== Silicate composition ====
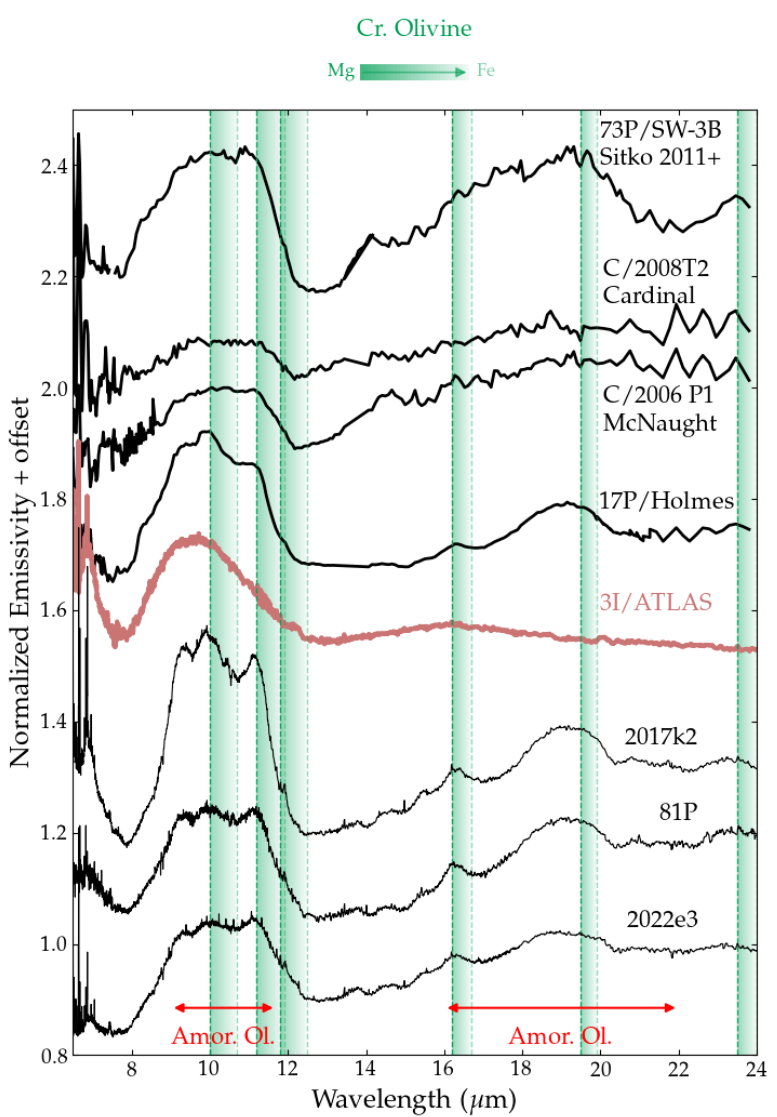
Plot showing the mid-infrared emissivity spectrum of 3I/ATLAS (red) compared to that of several Solar System comets (black). The locations of the spectral signatures of crystalline olivine are shown in green. 3I/ATLAS is an outlier from the ensemble of observed cometary mineralogies due to its lack of crystalline silicates.

Mid-infrared observations of 3I/ATLAS with the James Webb Space Telescope's Mid-Infrared Instrument's Medium-Resolution Spectrometer have characterized the emissivity spectrum of the interstellar object. Unlike all observed comets in the Solar System, 3I/ATLAS shows no evidence for crystalline silicates, and instead has a spectrum well-matched by amorphous silicates (of pyroxene and olivine-like stoichiometry), similar to those seen in the interstellar medium or evolved protoplanetary disks. Comets in the Solar System show evidence for crystalline silicates due to turbulent radial mixing of condensed solids from the inner part of the disk outwards. The lack of such mineralogical components in 3I/ATLAS is additional evidence for a cold and distant formation out of material inherited from the interstellar medium. Additionally, 3I/ATLAS shows some evidence for the presence of carbonate minerals such as magnesite and siderite, as well as abundant amorphous carbon, which is a common solid-state constituent in comets.

=== Rotation ===
The nucleus of 3I/ATLAS is expected to be irregularly shaped like other comets, which should cause periodic variations in 3I/ATLAS's brightness as it rotates. However, because the nucleus of 3I/ATLAS is partially obscured by a dusty coma, the nucleus's brightness variations are reduced, which makes it difficult to measure its rotation period using telescopic observations. Some early studies from July 2025 were unable to determine a rotation period for 3I/ATLAS's nucleus, but one study led by Raul de la Fuente Marcos and colleagues reported a rotation period of 16.79±0.23 hours, using observations by the Gran Telescopio Canarias from 2 to 5 July. Another study published by Toni Santana-Ros and colleagues in August 2025 reported a similar (albeit shorter) rotation period of 16.16±0.01 hours, using observations by multiple different telescopes from 2 to 29 July. Santana-Ros and colleagues noted that the brightness variations of 3I/ATLAS had decreased from 0.3 to 0.2 magnitudes throughout July 2025, which likely indicates that 3I/ATLAS's nucleus became more obscured as it became more active. In August 2025, Virginio Oldani and other Italian astronomers performed an analysis of 3I/ATLAS's coma shape in Hubble Space Telescope images and suggested that the rotational north pole of 3I/ATLAS's nucleus may be pointed toward the directions of either RA 154°, Dec +25° or RA 334°, Dec –25°. A December 2025 analysis by Miquel Serra-Ricart and colleagues found that 3I/ATLAS exhibited a wobbling jet of gas and dust in images from August 2025, which they attribute to the rotation of the comet's nucleus. Serra-Ricart and colleagues determined a rotation period of 15.48±0.70 hours based on the wobbling rate of 3I/ATLAS jet.

== Exploration ==
A July 2025 study led by Atsuhiro Yaginuma and collaborators found that launching a space probe from Earth to perform a fly by of 3I/ATLAS is not feasible, as any post-discovery launch (after 1 July 2025) would require an extremely high delta-v (Δv) at least 24 km/s, which is beyond the capability of any propulsion system available at this time. If 3I/ATLAS had been discovered before 1 July 2025, a space probe launched from Earth on that date would have required Δv~7 km/s to visit the comet. It would have been more feasible to visit 3I/ATLAS using a space probe departing from Mars, which requires substantially less Δv. For example, putative space probes departing from Mars between July and September 2025 would require Δv~5 km/s to fly by 3I/ATLAS in early October 2025.

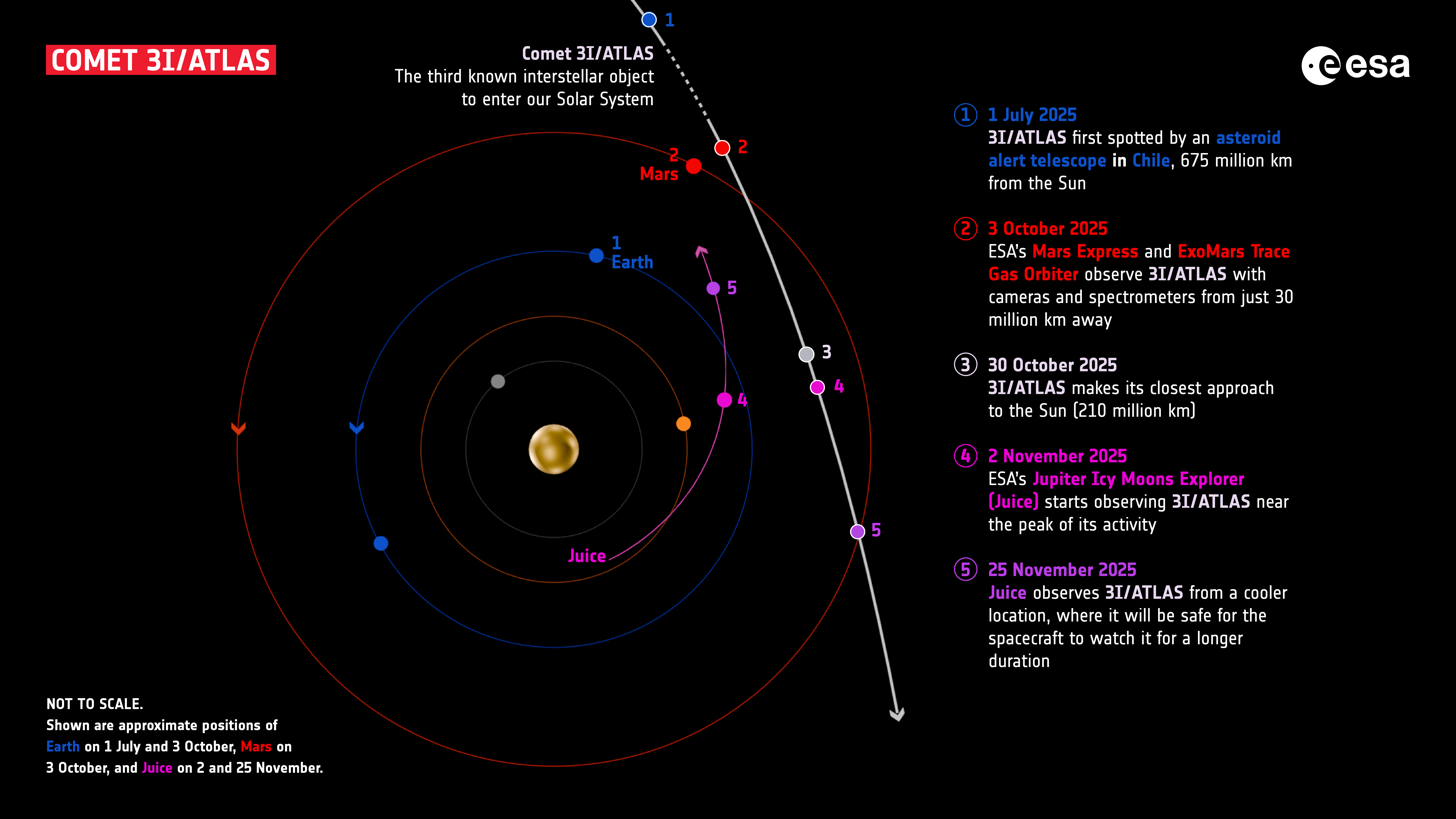
Observability of 3I/ATLAS by ESA Mars and Jupiter spacecraft

Between 1 and 7 October 2025, two of ESA's Mars orbiters, Trace Gas Orbiter (TGO) and Mars Express, observed 3I/ATLAS during its closest approach to the planet. TGO was able to capture the comet with its camera, but it could not be seen on photos by Mars Express, likely because of much lower exposure time. NASA's Mars Reconnaissance Orbiter also observed the comet, but data was not released due to NASA being shut down. The CNSA's Mars orbiter Tianwen-1 also managed to image 3I/ATLAS.

The Juno spacecraft orbiting Jupiter could have been able to observe 3I/ATLAS when it passed close to Jupiter in March 2026, but it is unlikely that Juno could have been redirected to 3I/ATLAS because the spacecraft is low on fuel and has issues with its engine. Astrophysicist Marshall Eubanks has calculated that the Psyche spacecraft passed about 0.302 AU (45.2 million km; 28.1 million mi) from 3I/ATLAS on 4 September 2025, while the Jupiter Icy Moons Explorer (Juice) passed within 0.428 AU (64.0 million km; 39.8 million mi) from 3I/ATLAS on 4 November 2025. However, commanding these spacecraft to observe 3I/ATLAS would be difficult and could introduce risks to their primary missions. Despite this, Juice observed 3I/ATLAS in November 2025 using its cameras, spectrometers, and a particle sensor.

From 30 October to 6 November 2025, it was predicted that Europa Clipper would potentially be immersed within the ion tail of 3I/ATLAS, providing the opportunity to detect the signatures of an interstellar comet's ion tail. Characteristic changes to the solar wind are also expected to be observed; a magnetic draping structure associated with the comet may be identifiable. It was further predicted that spacecraft Hera would possibly be immersed within the ion tail of 3I/ATLAS from 25 October to 1 November 2025.

== Alien spacecraft speculation ==
On 16 July 2025, astrophysicist Avi Loeb and other researchers of the Initiative for Interstellar Studies posted a paper on arXiv speculating that 3I/ATLAS could be an extraterrestrial spacecraft because they believed the object had "anomalous" characteristics, such as having an apparently large size, lack of identifiable chemicals, and an apparently improbable trajectory aligned with the Solar System's ecliptic plane. Other astronomers, including Chris Lintott, immediately criticized Loeb's speculation; the science news website Live Science reported that "the overwhelming consensus is that it is a comet", with many researchers "disappointed with the new paper and pointed out that it distracts from the work of other scientists". Several astrophysicists, including Scott Manley and David Kipping, promptly pointed out flaws in Loeb's statistical analysis of 3I/ATLAS's trajectory. Darryl Seligman, who led the first published study on 3I/ATLAS, stated that "there have been numerous telescopic observations of 3I/ATLAS demonstrating that it's displaying classical signatures of cometary activity." Seligman further elaborated that chemicals in 3I/ATLAS may not be detectable yet since the object was still far away from the Sun. JWST has since confirmed that 3I/ATLAS is outgassing CO_{2}, water, and CO. On 31 July to 1 August, the Swift Observatory found tentative evidence for water vapor and OH. Cyanide gas (CN) and atomic nickel vapor were detected by the VLT on 14 August 2025 and 20 July 2025 respectively. These substances are commonly found in comets.

Loeb previously suggested that 1I/ʻOumuamua and other interstellar objects including the possibly interstellar meteor CNEOS 2014-01-08 could be extraterrestrial spacecraft, for which he was also criticized by many researchers. While Loeb has written in his blog that "the most likely outcome will be that 3I/ATLAS is a completely natural interstellar object, probably a comet," he defended his hypothesis as an "interesting exercise in its own right, and is fun to explore, irrespective of its likely validity". Astronomer Samantha Lawler highlighted that "while it is important to remain open-minded about any 'testable prediction', the new paper [by Loeb et al.] pushes this sentiment to the limit." Lawler further said that extraordinary claims require extraordinary evidence, while "the evidence presented [by Loeb et al.] is absolutely not extraordinary."
