= List of minor planets: 245001–246000 =

The following is a partial list of minor planets, running from minor-planet number 245001 through 246000, inclusive. The primary data for this and other partial lists is based on JPL's "Small-Body Orbital Elements" and data available from the Minor Planet Center. Critical list information is also provided by the MPC, unless otherwise specified from Lowell Observatory. A detailed description of the table's columns and additional sources are given on the main page including a complete list of every page in this series, and a statistical break-up on the dynamical classification of minor planets.

Also see the summary list of all named bodies in numerical and alphabetical order, and the corresponding naming citations for the number range of this particular list. New namings may only be added to this list after official publication, as the preannouncement of names is condemned by the Working Group for Small Bodies Nomenclature of the International Astronomical Union.

Near-Earth obj.	MBA (inner)	MBA (outer)	Centaur
Mars-crosser	MBA (middle)	Jupiter trojan	Trans-Neptunian obj.
Unclassified

== 245001–245100 ==
Designation			Discovery			Properties		Ref
Permanent	Provisional	Named after	Date	Site	Discoverer(s)	Category	Diam.	Ref
245001	2004 CQ_{29}	—	February 12, 2004	Kitt Peak	Spacewatch	·	2.0 km	MPC · JPL
245002	2004 CE_{34}	—	February 13, 2004	Kitt Peak	Spacewatch	EOS	2.9 km	MPC · JPL
245003	2004 CR_{44}	—	February 13, 2004	Kitt Peak	Spacewatch	·	4.8 km	MPC · JPL
245004	2004 CN_{50}	—	February 14, 2004	Haleakala	NEAT	H	870 m	MPC · JPL
245005	2004 CK_{53}	—	February 11, 2004	Palomar	NEAT	·	4.8 km	MPC · JPL
245006	2004 CX_{56}	—	February 10, 2004	Palomar	NEAT	·	3.4 km	MPC · JPL
245007	2004 CV_{72}	—	February 13, 2004	Kitt Peak	Spacewatch	3:2	6.8 km	MPC · JPL
245008	2004 CQ_{76}	—	February 11, 2004	Palomar	NEAT	·	3.5 km	MPC · JPL
245009	2004 CP_{85}	—	February 14, 2004	Kitt Peak	Spacewatch	·	4.6 km	MPC · JPL
245010	2004 CY_{95}	—	February 14, 2004	Kitt Peak	Spacewatch	·	3.0 km	MPC · JPL
245011	2004 CM_{107}	—	February 14, 2004	Kitt Peak	Spacewatch	·	3.4 km	MPC · JPL
245012	2004 CR_{107}	—	February 14, 2004	Kitt Peak	Spacewatch	(8737)	4.4 km	MPC · JPL
245013	2004 CJ_{108}	—	February 15, 2004	Socorro	LINEAR	(1298)	3.3 km	MPC · JPL
245014	2004 CU_{111}	—	February 14, 2004	Kitt Peak	Spacewatch	TIR	3.4 km	MPC · JPL
245015	2004 CB_{115}	—	February 14, 2004	Socorro	LINEAR	EUP	6.1 km	MPC · JPL
245016	2004 DH_{10}	—	February 18, 2004	Desert Eagle	W. K. Y. Yeung	·	6.5 km	MPC · JPL
245017	2004 DM_{39}	—	February 22, 2004	Kitt Peak	Spacewatch	·	2.9 km	MPC · JPL
245018	2004 DL_{51}	—	February 23, 2004	Socorro	LINEAR	·	3.6 km	MPC · JPL
245019	2004 DP_{59}	—	February 25, 2004	Desert Eagle	W. K. Y. Yeung	·	3.2 km	MPC · JPL
245020	2004 DQ_{61}	—	February 26, 2004	Socorro	LINEAR	·	2.9 km	MPC · JPL
245021	2004 DN_{62}	—	February 23, 2004	Socorro	LINEAR	EOS	2.5 km	MPC · JPL
245022	2004 DB_{66}	—	February 23, 2004	Socorro	LINEAR	·	5.5 km	MPC · JPL
245023	2004 DB_{69}	—	February 26, 2004	Kitt Peak	M. W. Buie	·	4.3 km	MPC · JPL
245024	2004 EV_{3}	—	March 10, 2004	Palomar	NEAT	EUP	5.5 km	MPC · JPL
245025	2004 EL_{10}	—	March 14, 2004	Kitt Peak	Spacewatch	EOS	2.8 km	MPC · JPL
245026	2004 EG_{12}	—	March 11, 2004	Palomar	NEAT	·	2.4 km	MPC · JPL
245027	2004 EQ_{13}	—	March 11, 2004	Palomar	NEAT	HYG	3.2 km	MPC · JPL
245028	2004 EM_{17}	—	March 12, 2004	Palomar	NEAT	·	6.3 km	MPC · JPL
245029	2004 EX_{21}	—	March 15, 2004	Desert Eagle	W. K. Y. Yeung	NYS	2.6 km	MPC · JPL
245030	2004 EH_{23}	—	March 15, 2004	Socorro	LINEAR	·	3.3 km	MPC · JPL
245031	2004 EE_{45}	—	March 15, 2004	Kitt Peak	Spacewatch	·	2.1 km	MPC · JPL
245032	2004 EB_{52}	—	March 15, 2004	Kitt Peak	Spacewatch	·	5.3 km	MPC · JPL
245033	2004 EB_{56}	—	March 14, 2004	Palomar	NEAT	·	3.3 km	MPC · JPL
245034	2004 EE_{58}	—	March 15, 2004	Catalina	CSS	EOS	2.4 km	MPC · JPL
245035	2004 EK_{63}	—	March 13, 2004	Palomar	NEAT	EUP	5.1 km	MPC · JPL
245036	2004 EM_{69}	—	March 15, 2004	Kitt Peak	Spacewatch	EOS	2.2 km	MPC · JPL
245037	2004 EB_{75}	—	March 14, 2004	Kitt Peak	Spacewatch	THM	2.6 km	MPC · JPL
245038	2004 EL_{76}	—	March 15, 2004	Kitt Peak	Spacewatch	·	3.9 km	MPC · JPL
245039	2004 EM_{77}	—	March 15, 2004	Socorro	LINEAR	·	3.1 km	MPC · JPL
245040	2004 EZ_{80}	—	March 15, 2004	Socorro	LINEAR	·	5.1 km	MPC · JPL
245041	2004 EK_{87}	—	March 14, 2004	Kitt Peak	Spacewatch	·	2.7 km	MPC · JPL
245042	2004 FZ_{19}	—	March 16, 2004	Socorro	LINEAR	·	3.2 km	MPC · JPL
245043	2004 FD_{20}	—	March 16, 2004	Socorro	LINEAR	·	2.2 km	MPC · JPL
245044	2004 FU_{24}	—	March 17, 2004	Socorro	LINEAR	·	5.0 km	MPC · JPL
245045	2004 FQ_{26}	—	March 17, 2004	Kitt Peak	Spacewatch	·	1.7 km	MPC · JPL
245046	2004 FT_{31}	—	March 30, 2004	Socorro	LINEAR	H	900 m	MPC · JPL
245047	2004 FN_{46}	—	March 17, 2004	Socorro	LINEAR	·	3.6 km	MPC · JPL
245048	2004 FL_{69}	—	March 16, 2004	Kitt Peak	Spacewatch	THM	3.0 km	MPC · JPL
245049	2004 FU_{71}	—	March 17, 2004	Kitt Peak	Spacewatch	·	4.0 km	MPC · JPL
245050	2004 FA_{79}	—	March 19, 2004	Kitt Peak	Spacewatch	THM	2.3 km	MPC · JPL
245051	2004 FK_{80}	—	March 22, 2004	Socorro	LINEAR	·	2.8 km	MPC · JPL
245052	2004 FO_{85}	—	March 18, 2004	Kitt Peak	Spacewatch	·	5.0 km	MPC · JPL
245053	2004 FT_{91}	—	March 22, 2004	Socorro	LINEAR	·	4.8 km	MPC · JPL
245054	2004 FW_{97}	—	March 23, 2004	Socorro	LINEAR	·	3.5 km	MPC · JPL
245055	2004 FS_{98}	—	March 19, 2004	Socorro	LINEAR	HYG	3.7 km	MPC · JPL
245056	2004 FN_{107}	—	March 20, 2004	Socorro	LINEAR	·	4.5 km	MPC · JPL
245057	2004 FW_{129}	—	March 20, 2004	Socorro	LINEAR	·	5.4 km	MPC · JPL
245058	2004 FL_{132}	—	March 23, 2004	Kitt Peak	Spacewatch	EOS	2.3 km	MPC · JPL
245059	2004 FS_{133}	—	March 24, 2004	Catalina	CSS	H	790 m	MPC · JPL
245060	2004 FF_{147}	—	March 28, 2004	Anderson Mesa	LONEOS	EUP	5.3 km	MPC · JPL
245061	2004 FN_{148}	—	March 29, 2004	Socorro	LINEAR	TIR	4.1 km	MPC · JPL
245062	2004 GF_{3}	—	April 9, 2004	Siding Spring	SSS	EOS	2.8 km	MPC · JPL
245063	2004 GD_{5}	—	April 11, 2004	Palomar	NEAT	·	4.6 km	MPC · JPL
245064	2004 GL_{7}	—	April 12, 2004	Kitt Peak	Spacewatch	VER	3.4 km	MPC · JPL
245065	2004 GV_{10}	—	April 13, 2004	Kitt Peak	Spacewatch	·	4.0 km	MPC · JPL
245066	2004 GG_{12}	—	April 9, 2004	Siding Spring	SSS	·	3.4 km	MPC · JPL
245067	2004 GX_{21}	—	April 12, 2004	Catalina	CSS	TIR	4.2 km	MPC · JPL
245068	2004 GY_{39}	—	April 15, 2004	Siding Spring	SSS	·	4.8 km	MPC · JPL
245069	2004 GG_{53}	—	April 13, 2004	Kitt Peak	Spacewatch	·	2.4 km	MPC · JPL
245070	2004 GA_{57}	—	April 14, 2004	Kitt Peak	Spacewatch	·	2.6 km	MPC · JPL
245071	2004 GX_{58}	—	April 15, 2004	Anderson Mesa	LONEOS	·	2.9 km	MPC · JPL
245072	2004 GR_{59}	—	April 13, 2004	Kitt Peak	Spacewatch	·	4.7 km	MPC · JPL
245073	2004 GS_{77}	—	April 15, 2004	Socorro	LINEAR	·	4.7 km	MPC · JPL
245074	2004 HJ	—	April 16, 2004	Socorro	LINEAR	T_{j} (2.99)	5.6 km	MPC · JPL
245075	2004 HB_{12}	—	April 19, 2004	Socorro	LINEAR	·	3.7 km	MPC · JPL
245076	2004 HC_{64}	—	April 25, 2004	Kitt Peak	Spacewatch	·	5.0 km	MPC · JPL
245077	2004 JV_{1}	—	May 10, 2004	Reedy Creek	J. Broughton	·	5.0 km	MPC · JPL
245078	2004 JU_{36}	—	May 13, 2004	Kitt Peak	Spacewatch	·	3.2 km	MPC · JPL
245079	2004 JD_{42}	—	May 15, 2004	Siding Spring	SSS	·	6.2 km	MPC · JPL
245080	2004 LN_{4}	—	June 11, 2004	Socorro	LINEAR	·	5.2 km	MPC · JPL
245081	2004 MK_{6}	—	June 20, 2004	Socorro	LINEAR	PHO	1.5 km	MPC · JPL
245082	2004 NY_{10}	—	July 10, 2004	Catalina	CSS	·	3.7 km	MPC · JPL
245083	2004 NK_{14}	—	July 11, 2004	Socorro	LINEAR	·	4.3 km	MPC · JPL
245084	2004 NV_{28}	—	July 14, 2004	Socorro	LINEAR	·	960 m	MPC · JPL
245085	2004 OV_{6}	—	July 16, 2004	Socorro	LINEAR	·	4.5 km	MPC · JPL
245086	2004 OL_{11}	—	July 25, 2004	Anderson Mesa	LONEOS	·	5.8 km	MPC · JPL
245087	2004 PU	—	August 6, 2004	Palomar	NEAT	·	3.4 km	MPC · JPL
245088	2004 PJ_{7}	—	August 6, 2004	Palomar	NEAT	(2076)	1.3 km	MPC · JPL
245089	2004 PZ_{8}	—	August 6, 2004	Palomar	NEAT	·	1.1 km	MPC · JPL
245090	2004 PB_{9}	—	August 6, 2004	Palomar	NEAT	·	1.9 km	MPC · JPL
245091	2004 PA_{12}	—	August 7, 2004	Palomar	NEAT	·	4.9 km	MPC · JPL
245092	2004 PA_{14}	—	August 7, 2004	Palomar	NEAT	·	6.1 km	MPC · JPL
245093	2004 PC_{24}	—	August 8, 2004	Socorro	LINEAR	3:2	8.2 km	MPC · JPL
245094	2004 PT_{25}	—	August 8, 2004	Socorro	LINEAR	MAS	1.1 km	MPC · JPL
245095	2004 PY_{25}	—	August 8, 2004	Socorro	LINEAR	EUP	6.9 km	MPC · JPL
245096	2004 PF_{27}	—	August 8, 2004	Reedy Creek	J. Broughton	VER	5.3 km	MPC · JPL
245097	2004 PD_{33}	—	August 8, 2004	Socorro	LINEAR	·	1.7 km	MPC · JPL
245098	2004 PN_{34}	—	August 8, 2004	Anderson Mesa	LONEOS	·	1.5 km	MPC · JPL
245099	2004 PQ_{37}	—	August 9, 2004	Socorro	LINEAR	ADE	3.7 km	MPC · JPL
245100	2004 PY_{38}	—	August 9, 2004	Anderson Mesa	LONEOS	ADE	3.8 km	MPC · JPL

== 245101–245200 ==
back to top

Designation			Discovery			Properties		Ref
Permanent	Provisional	Named after	Date	Site	Discoverer(s)	Category	Diam.	Ref
245101	2004 PS_{39}	—	August 9, 2004	Anderson Mesa	LONEOS	V	790 m	MPC · JPL
245102	2004 PL_{40}	—	August 9, 2004	Socorro	LINEAR	·	4.7 km	MPC · JPL
245103	2004 PW_{58}	—	August 9, 2004	Socorro	LINEAR	·	5.0 km	MPC · JPL
245104	2004 PF_{59}	—	August 9, 2004	Socorro	LINEAR	·	1.7 km	MPC · JPL
245105	2004 PB_{65}	—	August 10, 2004	Socorro	LINEAR	·	1.5 km	MPC · JPL
245106	2004 PL_{70}	—	August 7, 2004	Campo Imperatore	CINEOS	(194)	1.3 km	MPC · JPL
245107	2004 PG_{79}	—	August 9, 2004	Socorro	LINEAR	V	820 m	MPC · JPL
245108	2004 PY_{80}	—	August 10, 2004	Socorro	LINEAR	·	900 m	MPC · JPL
245109	2004 PR_{89}	—	August 10, 2004	Campo Imperatore	CINEOS	·	2.7 km	MPC · JPL
245110	2004 PO_{97}	—	August 15, 2004	Pla D'Arguines	D'Arguines, Pla	VER	4.3 km	MPC · JPL
245111	2004 PM_{98}	—	August 8, 2004	Socorro	LINEAR	VER	5.2 km	MPC · JPL
245112	2004 PE_{101}	—	August 11, 2004	Socorro	LINEAR	·	2.0 km	MPC · JPL
245113	2004 PD_{114}	—	August 15, 2004	Palomar	NEAT	·	7.4 km	MPC · JPL
245114	2004 PJ_{114}	—	August 8, 2004	Palomar	NEAT	·	1.6 km	MPC · JPL
245115	2004 QO_{12}	—	August 21, 2004	Siding Spring	SSS	·	890 m	MPC · JPL
245116	2004 QY_{12}	—	August 21, 2004	Siding Spring	SSS	EOS	3.5 km	MPC · JPL
245117	2004 QN_{14}	—	August 21, 2004	Catalina	CSS	·	1.5 km	MPC · JPL
245118	2004 QG_{18}	—	August 20, 2004	Socorro	LINEAR	·	3.6 km	MPC · JPL
245119	2004 QS_{20}	—	August 20, 2004	Catalina	CSS	·	8.3 km	MPC · JPL
245120	2004 QP_{21}	—	August 23, 2004	Kitt Peak	Spacewatch	·	980 m	MPC · JPL
245121	2004 QX_{27}	—	August 16, 2004	Palomar	NEAT	·	4.3 km	MPC · JPL
245122	2004 RG_{6}	—	September 4, 2004	Palomar	NEAT	·	4.6 km	MPC · JPL
245123	2004 RE_{18}	—	September 7, 2004	Socorro	LINEAR	·	980 m	MPC · JPL
245124	2004 RN_{47}	—	September 8, 2004	Socorro	LINEAR	·	3.1 km	MPC · JPL
245125	2004 RQ_{52}	—	September 8, 2004	Socorro	LINEAR	HYG	5.2 km	MPC · JPL
245126	2004 RJ_{57}	—	September 8, 2004	Socorro	LINEAR	·	870 m	MPC · JPL
245127	2004 RD_{65}	—	September 8, 2004	Socorro	LINEAR	·	1.1 km	MPC · JPL
245128	2004 RE_{66}	—	September 8, 2004	Socorro	LINEAR	·	1.4 km	MPC · JPL
245129	2004 RR_{68}	—	September 8, 2004	Socorro	LINEAR	(2076)	1.1 km	MPC · JPL
245130	2004 RB_{76}	—	September 8, 2004	Socorro	LINEAR	·	930 m	MPC · JPL
245131	2004 RD_{78}	—	September 8, 2004	Socorro	LINEAR	·	1.2 km	MPC · JPL
245132	2004 RV_{88}	—	September 8, 2004	Socorro	LINEAR	·	4.7 km	MPC · JPL
245133	2004 RL_{94}	—	September 8, 2004	Socorro	LINEAR	PAD	3.4 km	MPC · JPL
245134	2004 RT_{95}	—	September 8, 2004	Socorro	LINEAR	(43176)	3.5 km	MPC · JPL
245135	2004 RP_{104}	—	September 8, 2004	Palomar	NEAT	·	1.9 km	MPC · JPL
245136	2004 RJ_{106}	—	September 8, 2004	Palomar	NEAT	·	2.2 km	MPC · JPL
245137	2004 RY_{106}	—	September 9, 2004	Socorro	LINEAR	·	3.2 km	MPC · JPL
245138	2004 RU_{172}	—	September 9, 2004	Kitt Peak	Spacewatch	·	840 m	MPC · JPL
245139	2004 RQ_{214}	—	September 11, 2004	Socorro	LINEAR	·	2.1 km	MPC · JPL
245140	2004 RX_{237}	—	September 10, 2004	Kitt Peak	Spacewatch	·	1.4 km	MPC · JPL
245141	2004 RM_{248}	—	September 12, 2004	Socorro	LINEAR	NYS	1.6 km	MPC · JPL
245142	2004 RQ_{257}	—	September 9, 2004	Anderson Mesa	LONEOS	·	5.0 km	MPC · JPL
245143	2004 RR_{257}	—	September 9, 2004	Anderson Mesa	LONEOS	·	4.2 km	MPC · JPL
245144	2004 RB_{288}	—	September 15, 2004	7300	W. K. Y. Yeung	·	3.6 km	MPC · JPL
245145	2004 RW_{291}	—	September 10, 2004	Socorro	LINEAR	·	1.6 km	MPC · JPL
245146	2004 RV_{311}	—	September 14, 2004	Socorro	LINEAR	V	870 m	MPC · JPL
245147	2004 RS_{319}	—	September 13, 2004	Socorro	LINEAR	·	3.3 km	MPC · JPL
245148	2004 RJ_{329}	—	September 15, 2004	Anderson Mesa	LONEOS	·	960 m	MPC · JPL
245149	2004 RZ_{331}	—	September 14, 2004	Palomar	NEAT	·	880 m	MPC · JPL
245150	2004 RM_{332}	—	September 14, 2004	Palomar	NEAT	·	2.0 km	MPC · JPL
245151	2004 RG_{339}	—	September 15, 2004	Kitt Peak	Spacewatch	·	990 m	MPC · JPL
245152	2004 RP_{341}	—	September 7, 2004	Socorro	LINEAR	THM	3.6 km	MPC · JPL
245153	2004 SJ_{13}	—	September 17, 2004	Socorro	LINEAR	·	720 m	MPC · JPL
245154	2004 SO_{15}	—	September 17, 2004	Anderson Mesa	LONEOS	·	2.4 km	MPC · JPL
245155	2004 SC_{17}	—	September 17, 2004	Anderson Mesa	LONEOS	·	1.5 km	MPC · JPL
245156	2004 SH_{41}	—	September 17, 2004	Kitt Peak	Spacewatch	NYS	970 m	MPC · JPL
245157	2004 TK_{3}	—	October 4, 2004	Kitt Peak	Spacewatch	·	650 m	MPC · JPL
245158 Thomasandrews	2004 TU_{18}	Thomasandrews	October 13, 2004	Vail-Jarnac	Glinos, T., D. H. Levy	·	910 m	MPC · JPL
245159	2004 TM_{29}	—	October 4, 2004	Kitt Peak	Spacewatch	V	740 m	MPC · JPL
245160	2004 TG_{41}	—	October 4, 2004	Anderson Mesa	LONEOS	·	1.8 km	MPC · JPL
245161	2004 TY_{42}	—	October 4, 2004	Kitt Peak	Spacewatch	·	2.0 km	MPC · JPL
245162	2004 TO_{55}	—	October 4, 2004	Kitt Peak	Spacewatch	V	830 m	MPC · JPL
245163	2004 TW_{89}	—	October 5, 2004	Palomar	NEAT	PHO	1.7 km	MPC · JPL
245164	2004 TC_{90}	—	October 5, 2004	Kitt Peak	Spacewatch	·	1.6 km	MPC · JPL
245165	2004 TA_{97}	—	October 5, 2004	Kitt Peak	Spacewatch	·	1.4 km	MPC · JPL
245166	2004 TB_{101}	—	October 6, 2004	Kitt Peak	Spacewatch	·	1.9 km	MPC · JPL
245167	2004 TR_{103}	—	October 7, 2004	Kitt Peak	Spacewatch	·	1.6 km	MPC · JPL
245168	2004 TE_{104}	—	October 7, 2004	Kitt Peak	Spacewatch	V	910 m	MPC · JPL
245169	2004 TE_{109}	—	October 7, 2004	Anderson Mesa	LONEOS	ERI	2.3 km	MPC · JPL
245170	2004 TE_{116}	—	October 4, 2004	Apache Point	Apache Point	·	1.7 km	MPC · JPL
245171	2004 TM_{116}	—	October 4, 2004	Anderson Mesa	LONEOS	·	1.2 km	MPC · JPL
245172	2004 TU_{124}	—	October 7, 2004	Socorro	LINEAR	·	1.9 km	MPC · JPL
245173	2004 TA_{135}	—	October 8, 2004	Anderson Mesa	LONEOS	·	1.7 km	MPC · JPL
245174	2004 TO_{135}	—	October 8, 2004	Anderson Mesa	LONEOS	·	2.0 km	MPC · JPL
245175	2004 TL_{136}	—	October 8, 2004	Anderson Mesa	LONEOS	DOR	2.5 km	MPC · JPL
245176	2004 TO_{136}	—	October 8, 2004	Anderson Mesa	LONEOS	·	2.1 km	MPC · JPL
245177	2004 TD_{138}	—	October 8, 2004	Palomar	NEAT	EUN	1.9 km	MPC · JPL
245178	2004 TW_{143}	—	October 4, 2004	Kitt Peak	Spacewatch	·	2.2 km	MPC · JPL
245179	2004 TZ_{172}	—	October 8, 2004	Socorro	LINEAR	·	3.8 km	MPC · JPL
245180	2004 TQ_{173}	—	October 8, 2004	Socorro	LINEAR	CYB	8.4 km	MPC · JPL
245181	2004 TD_{176}	—	October 9, 2004	Socorro	LINEAR	·	1.6 km	MPC · JPL
245182	2004 TM_{190}	—	October 7, 2004	Kitt Peak	Spacewatch	·	1.3 km	MPC · JPL
245183	2004 TP_{210}	—	October 8, 2004	Kitt Peak	Spacewatch	NYS	1.0 km	MPC · JPL
245184	2004 TD_{239}	—	October 9, 2004	Kitt Peak	Spacewatch	·	990 m	MPC · JPL
245185	2004 TA_{247}	—	October 7, 2004	Socorro	LINEAR	·	1.2 km	MPC · JPL
245186	2004 TW_{255}	—	October 9, 2004	Socorro	LINEAR	·	810 m	MPC · JPL
245187	2004 TN_{266}	—	October 9, 2004	Kitt Peak	Spacewatch	·	1.8 km	MPC · JPL
245188	2004 TD_{273}	—	October 9, 2004	Kitt Peak	Spacewatch	NYS	1.1 km	MPC · JPL
245189	2004 TV_{273}	—	October 9, 2004	Kitt Peak	Spacewatch	(5)	1.6 km	MPC · JPL
245190	2004 TA_{283}	—	October 7, 2004	Anderson Mesa	LONEOS	·	3.1 km	MPC · JPL
245191	2004 TN_{287}	—	October 9, 2004	Socorro	LINEAR	(2076)	1.2 km	MPC · JPL
245192	2004 TA_{288}	—	October 9, 2004	Kitt Peak	Spacewatch	·	2.2 km	MPC · JPL
245193	2004 TB_{299}	—	October 13, 2004	Kitt Peak	Spacewatch	·	1.4 km	MPC · JPL
245194	2004 TQ_{301}	—	October 8, 2004	Anderson Mesa	LONEOS	·	1.9 km	MPC · JPL
245195	2004 TP_{304}	—	October 10, 2004	Kitt Peak	Spacewatch	·	2.9 km	MPC · JPL
245196	2004 TA_{325}	—	October 12, 2004	Kitt Peak	Spacewatch	·	940 m	MPC · JPL
245197	2004 TC_{332}	—	October 9, 2004	Kitt Peak	Spacewatch	·	1.6 km	MPC · JPL
245198	2004 TN_{340}	—	October 13, 2004	Anderson Mesa	LONEOS	ADE	2.4 km	MPC · JPL
245199	2004 TO_{366}	—	October 7, 2004	Socorro	LINEAR	PHO	1.3 km	MPC · JPL
245200	2004 UJ_{2}	—	October 18, 2004	Socorro	LINEAR	(2076)	1.2 km	MPC · JPL

== 245201–245300 ==
back to top

Designation			Discovery			Properties		Ref
Permanent	Provisional	Named after	Date	Site	Discoverer(s)	Category	Diam.	Ref
245201	2004 UQ_{4}	—	October 16, 2004	Socorro	LINEAR	·	2.3 km	MPC · JPL
245202	2004 UG_{9}	—	October 23, 2004	Socorro	LINEAR	·	1.5 km	MPC · JPL
245203	2004 VL_{5}	—	November 3, 2004	Anderson Mesa	LONEOS	ADE	2.9 km	MPC · JPL
245204	2004 VG_{6}	—	November 3, 2004	Kitt Peak	Spacewatch	·	2.2 km	MPC · JPL
245205	2004 VT_{15}	—	November 1, 2004	Palomar	NEAT	·	1.3 km	MPC · JPL
245206	2004 VT_{24}	—	November 4, 2004	Anderson Mesa	LONEOS	·	1.7 km	MPC · JPL
245207	2004 VZ_{25}	—	November 4, 2004	Catalina	CSS	·	1.1 km	MPC · JPL
245208	2004 VO_{38}	—	November 4, 2004	Kitt Peak	Spacewatch	·	1.3 km	MPC · JPL
245209	2004 VZ_{52}	—	November 4, 2004	Catalina	CSS	EUN	1.7 km	MPC · JPL
245210	2004 VL_{57}	—	November 5, 2004	Palomar	NEAT	·	2.5 km	MPC · JPL
245211	2004 VY_{57}	—	November 7, 2004	Socorro	LINEAR	·	2.6 km	MPC · JPL
245212	2004 VF_{72}	—	November 10, 2004	Kitt Peak	Spacewatch	V	920 m	MPC · JPL
245213	2004 VA_{96}	—	November 11, 2004	Anderson Mesa	LONEOS	EOS	3.5 km	MPC · JPL
245214	2004 WZ_{8}	—	November 19, 2004	Socorro	LINEAR	·	3.0 km	MPC · JPL
245215	2004 WW_{9}	—	November 16, 2004	Siding Spring	SSS	·	1.8 km	MPC · JPL
245216	2004 XG_{5}	—	December 2, 2004	Catalina	CSS	3:2	9.1 km	MPC · JPL
245217	2004 XL_{19}	—	December 8, 2004	Socorro	LINEAR	MAR	1.6 km	MPC · JPL
245218	2004 XN_{20}	—	December 8, 2004	Socorro	LINEAR	·	1.2 km	MPC · JPL
245219	2004 XU_{20}	—	December 8, 2004	Socorro	LINEAR	·	1.5 km	MPC · JPL
245220	2004 XY_{21}	—	December 8, 2004	Socorro	LINEAR	·	2.0 km	MPC · JPL
245221	2004 XJ_{28}	—	December 10, 2004	Catalina	CSS	·	4.2 km	MPC · JPL
245222	2004 XW_{37}	—	December 7, 2004	Socorro	LINEAR	BRA	2.5 km	MPC · JPL
245223	2004 XC_{45}	—	December 10, 2004	Socorro	LINEAR	NYS	1.3 km	MPC · JPL
245224	2004 XF_{53}	—	December 10, 2004	Kitt Peak	Spacewatch	NYS	2.0 km	MPC · JPL
245225	2004 XV_{77}	—	December 10, 2004	Socorro	LINEAR	·	1.2 km	MPC · JPL
245226	2004 XM_{88}	—	December 10, 2004	Socorro	LINEAR	·	720 m	MPC · JPL
245227	2004 XH_{98}	—	December 11, 2004	Kitt Peak	Spacewatch	·	3.0 km	MPC · JPL
245228	2004 XD_{100}	—	December 12, 2004	Kitt Peak	Spacewatch	·	1.8 km	MPC · JPL
245229	2004 XF_{100}	—	December 12, 2004	Kitt Peak	Spacewatch	·	2.3 km	MPC · JPL
245230	2004 XL_{106}	—	December 11, 2004	Socorro	LINEAR	·	1.3 km	MPC · JPL
245231	2004 XL_{113}	—	December 10, 2004	Kitt Peak	Spacewatch	·	1.5 km	MPC · JPL
245232	2004 XH_{119}	—	December 12, 2004	Kitt Peak	Spacewatch	·	2.7 km	MPC · JPL
245233	2004 XF_{126}	—	December 12, 2004	Socorro	LINEAR	JUN	1.6 km	MPC · JPL
245234	2004 XM_{126}	—	December 13, 2004	Kitt Peak	Spacewatch	·	1.9 km	MPC · JPL
245235	2004 XK_{129}	—	December 14, 2004	Catalina	CSS	·	3.3 km	MPC · JPL
245236	2004 XL_{130}	—	December 9, 2004	Catalina	CSS	·	1.5 km	MPC · JPL
245237	2004 XW_{132}	—	December 14, 2004	Catalina	CSS	PHO	3.8 km	MPC · JPL
245238	2004 XW_{134}	—	December 15, 2004	Socorro	LINEAR	·	4.0 km	MPC · JPL
245239	2004 XL_{141}	—	December 14, 2004	Socorro	LINEAR	·	5.3 km	MPC · JPL
245240	2004 XM_{146}	—	December 14, 2004	Socorro	LINEAR	·	3.1 km	MPC · JPL
245241	2004 XC_{160}	—	December 14, 2004	Kitt Peak	Spacewatch	ADE	2.4 km	MPC · JPL
245242	2004 XF_{162}	—	December 15, 2004	Socorro	LINEAR	·	1.6 km	MPC · JPL
245243	2004 XU_{162}	—	December 15, 2004	Socorro	LINEAR	·	2.1 km	MPC · JPL
245244	2004 XF_{163}	—	December 15, 2004	Kitt Peak	Spacewatch	·	2.9 km	MPC · JPL
245245	2004 XG_{163}	—	December 15, 2004	Catalina	CSS	·	2.5 km	MPC · JPL
245246	2004 XD_{186}	—	December 14, 2004	Kitt Peak	Spacewatch	·	4.0 km	MPC · JPL
245247	2004 YP	—	December 17, 2004	Socorro	LINEAR	·	2.7 km	MPC · JPL
245248	2004 YZ	—	December 16, 2004	Catalina	CSS	H	920 m	MPC · JPL
245249	2004 YT_{1}	—	December 18, 2004	Socorro	LINEAR	PHO	3.7 km	MPC · JPL
245250	2004 YG_{3}	—	December 16, 2004	Anderson Mesa	LONEOS	EUN	2.2 km	MPC · JPL
245251	2004 YH_{4}	—	December 16, 2004	Kitt Peak	Spacewatch	AGN	1.5 km	MPC · JPL
245252	2004 YZ_{26}	—	December 19, 2004	Mount Lemmon	Mount Lemmon Survey	·	2.0 km	MPC · JPL
245253	2004 YC_{31}	—	December 18, 2004	Socorro	LINEAR	·	1.9 km	MPC · JPL
245254	2004 YE_{33}	—	December 16, 2004	Anderson Mesa	LONEOS	·	1.2 km	MPC · JPL
245255	2005 AU_{1}	—	January 1, 2005	Catalina	CSS	·	2.0 km	MPC · JPL
245256	2005 AW_{7}	—	January 6, 2005	Catalina	CSS	·	3.1 km	MPC · JPL
245257	2005 AG_{8}	—	January 6, 2005	Catalina	CSS	·	2.1 km	MPC · JPL
245258	2005 AM_{14}	—	January 7, 2005	Socorro	LINEAR	·	2.8 km	MPC · JPL
245259	2005 AL_{16}	—	January 6, 2005	Socorro	LINEAR	·	2.6 km	MPC · JPL
245260	2005 AM_{18}	—	January 6, 2005	Catalina	CSS	·	3.1 km	MPC · JPL
245261	2005 AX_{21}	—	January 6, 2005	Catalina	CSS	·	3.1 km	MPC · JPL
245262	2005 AA_{26}	—	January 11, 2005	Socorro	LINEAR	·	1.8 km	MPC · JPL
245263	2005 AH_{29}	—	January 14, 2005	Kvistaberg	Uppsala-DLR Asteroid Survey	·	1.9 km	MPC · JPL
245264	2005 AC_{43}	—	January 15, 2005	Socorro	LINEAR	ADE	2.9 km	MPC · JPL
245265	2005 AT_{45}	—	January 15, 2005	Socorro	LINEAR	·	930 m	MPC · JPL
245266	2005 AF_{54}	—	January 13, 2005	Kitt Peak	Spacewatch	·	3.3 km	MPC · JPL
245267	2005 AW_{56}	—	January 15, 2005	Catalina	CSS	·	4.6 km	MPC · JPL
245268	2005 AB_{58}	—	January 15, 2005	Catalina	CSS	·	3.2 km	MPC · JPL
245269	2005 AP_{61}	—	January 15, 2005	Kitt Peak	Spacewatch	·	3.3 km	MPC · JPL
245270	2005 AX_{61}	—	January 15, 2005	Kitt Peak	Spacewatch	·	3.0 km	MPC · JPL
245271	2005 AE_{82}	—	January 9, 2005	Kvistaberg	Uppsala-DLR Asteroid Survey	NYS	1.7 km	MPC · JPL
245272	2005 BJ	—	January 16, 2005	Desert Eagle	W. K. Y. Yeung	·	2.0 km	MPC · JPL
245273	2005 BQ	—	January 16, 2005	Desert Eagle	W. K. Y. Yeung	·	2.2 km	MPC · JPL
245274	2005 BQ_{5}	—	January 16, 2005	Socorro	LINEAR	·	3.1 km	MPC · JPL
245275	2005 BQ_{10}	—	January 16, 2005	Kitt Peak	Spacewatch	·	1.8 km	MPC · JPL
245276	2005 BG_{18}	—	January 16, 2005	Socorro	LINEAR	·	4.4 km	MPC · JPL
245277	2005 BK_{19}	—	January 16, 2005	Socorro	LINEAR	EUP	4.5 km	MPC · JPL
245278	2005 BR_{24}	—	January 17, 2005	Socorro	LINEAR	·	3.4 km	MPC · JPL
245279	2005 BZ_{32}	—	January 16, 2005	Mauna Kea	Veillet, C.	L5	14 km	MPC · JPL
245280	2005 BK_{48}	—	January 17, 2005	La Silla	A. Boattini, H. Scholl	·	4.4 km	MPC · JPL
245281	2005 CY_{1}	—	February 1, 2005	Palomar	NEAT	·	3.1 km	MPC · JPL
245282	2005 CR_{2}	—	February 1, 2005	Catalina	CSS	·	1.4 km	MPC · JPL
245283	2005 CS_{7}	—	February 3, 2005	Palomar	NEAT	·	4.4 km	MPC · JPL
245284	2005 CT_{8}	—	February 1, 2005	Kitt Peak	Spacewatch	·	1.5 km	MPC · JPL
245285	2005 CZ_{8}	—	February 1, 2005	Catalina	CSS	·	2.2 km	MPC · JPL
245286	2005 CV_{10}	—	February 1, 2005	Kitt Peak	Spacewatch	·	2.9 km	MPC · JPL
245287	2005 CV_{17}	—	February 2, 2005	Socorro	LINEAR	·	1.6 km	MPC · JPL
245288	2005 CF_{19}	—	February 2, 2005	Catalina	CSS	·	1.4 km	MPC · JPL
245289	2005 CY_{26}	—	February 1, 2005	Catalina	CSS	·	1.6 km	MPC · JPL
245290	2005 CB_{29}	—	February 1, 2005	Kitt Peak	Spacewatch	(29841)	1.5 km	MPC · JPL
245291	2005 CD_{43}	—	February 2, 2005	Socorro	LINEAR	·	3.2 km	MPC · JPL
245292	2005 CU_{46}	—	February 2, 2005	Kitt Peak	Spacewatch	·	1.1 km	MPC · JPL
245293	2005 CF_{53}	—	February 3, 2005	Socorro	LINEAR	·	2.6 km	MPC · JPL
245294	2005 CL_{63}	—	February 9, 2005	Anderson Mesa	LONEOS	·	2.2 km	MPC · JPL
245295	2005 CE_{64}	—	February 9, 2005	Socorro	LINEAR	NYS ·	1.6 km	MPC · JPL
245296	2005 CN_{64}	—	February 9, 2005	Mount Lemmon	Mount Lemmon Survey	·	1.8 km	MPC · JPL
245297	2005 CS_{68}	—	February 3, 2005	Socorro	LINEAR	·	2.8 km	MPC · JPL
245298	2005 CX_{68}	—	February 4, 2005	Anderson Mesa	LONEOS	·	1.8 km	MPC · JPL
245299	2005 CK_{69}	—	February 7, 2005	Marly	P. Kocher	·	1.9 km	MPC · JPL
245300	2005 CX_{79}	—	February 1, 2005	Catalina	CSS	·	1.8 km	MPC · JPL

== 245301–245400 ==
back to top

Designation			Discovery			Properties		Ref
Permanent	Provisional	Named after	Date	Site	Discoverer(s)	Category	Diam.	Ref
245301	2005 EE_{6}	—	March 1, 2005	Kitt Peak	Spacewatch	·	1.7 km	MPC · JPL
245302	2005 EG_{11}	—	March 2, 2005	Catalina	CSS	·	1.6 km	MPC · JPL
245303	2005 EN_{16}	—	March 3, 2005	Vail-Jarnac	Jarnac	·	2.9 km	MPC · JPL
245304	2005 EZ_{26}	—	March 3, 2005	Catalina	CSS	·	4.2 km	MPC · JPL
245305	2005 EA_{28}	—	March 3, 2005	Socorro	LINEAR	(40134)	3.1 km	MPC · JPL
245306	2005 EN_{28}	—	March 3, 2005	Catalina	CSS	NYS ·	2.7 km	MPC · JPL
245307	2005 ER_{34}	—	March 3, 2005	Catalina	CSS	NEM	3.0 km	MPC · JPL
245308	2005 EA_{35}	—	March 3, 2005	Kitt Peak	Spacewatch	·	1.9 km	MPC · JPL
245309	2005 EX_{35}	—	March 4, 2005	Catalina	CSS	·	3.8 km	MPC · JPL
245310	2005 EH_{36}	—	March 4, 2005	Catalina	CSS	·	3.0 km	MPC · JPL
245311	2005 EA_{37}	—	March 4, 2005	Socorro	LINEAR	·	2.3 km	MPC · JPL
245312	2005 EQ_{37}	—	March 7, 2005	Junk Bond	Junk Bond	·	2.5 km	MPC · JPL
245313	2005 EY_{40}	—	March 1, 2005	Catalina	CSS	·	5.4 km	MPC · JPL
245314	2005 EH_{58}	—	March 4, 2005	Kitt Peak	Spacewatch	·	2.1 km	MPC · JPL
245315	2005 EP_{61}	—	March 4, 2005	Socorro	LINEAR	EOS	2.4 km	MPC · JPL
245316	2005 EY_{65}	—	March 4, 2005	Mount Lemmon	Mount Lemmon Survey	·	2.2 km	MPC · JPL
245317	2005 EN_{69}	—	March 4, 2005	Kitt Peak	Spacewatch	·	4.2 km	MPC · JPL
245318	2005 EO_{72}	—	March 2, 2005	Catalina	CSS	RAF	1.4 km	MPC · JPL
245319	2005 ES_{73}	—	March 3, 2005	Kitt Peak	Spacewatch	·	3.1 km	MPC · JPL
245320	2005 EY_{75}	—	March 3, 2005	Kitt Peak	Spacewatch	·	3.9 km	MPC · JPL
245321	2005 EU_{81}	—	March 4, 2005	Kitt Peak	Spacewatch	·	2.0 km	MPC · JPL
245322	2005 EE_{82}	—	March 4, 2005	Kitt Peak	Spacewatch	·	1.5 km	MPC · JPL
245323	2005 EH_{85}	—	March 4, 2005	Socorro	LINEAR	·	2.1 km	MPC · JPL
245324	2005 EQ_{87}	—	March 4, 2005	Mount Lemmon	Mount Lemmon Survey	HOF	3.6 km	MPC · JPL
245325	2005 EW_{90}	—	March 8, 2005	Kitt Peak	Spacewatch	·	2.3 km	MPC · JPL
245326	2005 EL_{91}	—	March 8, 2005	Kitt Peak	Spacewatch	·	2.5 km	MPC · JPL
245327	2005 EV_{92}	—	March 8, 2005	Anderson Mesa	LONEOS	·	2.6 km	MPC · JPL
245328	2005 EQ_{107}	—	March 4, 2005	Catalina	CSS	DOR	4.4 km	MPC · JPL
245329	2005 EZ_{116}	—	March 4, 2005	Mount Lemmon	Mount Lemmon Survey	WIT	1.1 km	MPC · JPL
245330	2005 EH_{128}	—	March 9, 2005	Kitt Peak	Spacewatch	·	3.0 km	MPC · JPL
245331	2005 EO_{133}	—	March 9, 2005	Socorro	LINEAR	·	4.6 km	MPC · JPL
245332	2005 EG_{138}	—	March 9, 2005	Socorro	LINEAR	·	2.4 km	MPC · JPL
245333	2005 ED_{144}	—	March 10, 2005	Mount Lemmon	Mount Lemmon Survey	EUN	1.5 km	MPC · JPL
245334	2005 EB_{147}	—	March 10, 2005	Mount Lemmon	Mount Lemmon Survey	·	2.9 km	MPC · JPL
245335	2005 EW_{147}	—	March 10, 2005	Kitt Peak	Spacewatch	·	2.7 km	MPC · JPL
245336	2005 EH_{148}	—	March 10, 2005	Kitt Peak	Spacewatch	(21344)	2.6 km	MPC · JPL
245337	2005 ED_{154}	—	March 7, 2005	Socorro	LINEAR	·	3.5 km	MPC · JPL
245338	2005 ED_{166}	—	March 11, 2005	Kitt Peak	Spacewatch	·	2.1 km	MPC · JPL
245339	2005 EP_{169}	—	March 9, 2005	Catalina	CSS	T_{j} (2.98) · EUP	6.1 km	MPC · JPL
245340	2005 EU_{169}	—	March 8, 2005	Catalina	CSS	T_{j} (2.98) · EUP	6.9 km	MPC · JPL
245341	2005 EU_{174}	—	March 8, 2005	Kitt Peak	Spacewatch	·	2.7 km	MPC · JPL
245342	2005 EC_{178}	—	March 9, 2005	Kitt Peak	Spacewatch	·	1.9 km	MPC · JPL
245343	2005 ES_{181}	—	March 9, 2005	Socorro	LINEAR	·	2.4 km	MPC · JPL
245344	2005 EO_{184}	—	March 9, 2005	Kitt Peak	Spacewatch	ADE	3.6 km	MPC · JPL
245345	2005 EH_{192}	—	March 11, 2005	Mount Lemmon	Mount Lemmon Survey	·	1.9 km	MPC · JPL
245346	2005 EB_{203}	—	March 10, 2005	Mount Lemmon	Mount Lemmon Survey	HOF	3.3 km	MPC · JPL
245347	2005 ED_{212}	—	March 4, 2005	Socorro	LINEAR	·	2.0 km	MPC · JPL
245348	2005 EN_{216}	—	March 8, 2005	Anderson Mesa	LONEOS	EUP	6.4 km	MPC · JPL
245349	2005 EL_{219}	—	March 10, 2005	Mount Lemmon	Mount Lemmon Survey	·	3.7 km	MPC · JPL
245350	2005 EV_{219}	—	March 10, 2005	Mount Lemmon	Mount Lemmon Survey	·	3.7 km	MPC · JPL
245351	2005 EC_{242}	—	March 11, 2005	Catalina	CSS	·	2.2 km	MPC · JPL
245352	2005 EJ_{247}	—	March 12, 2005	Socorro	LINEAR	·	2.6 km	MPC · JPL
245353	2005 ES_{250}	—	March 9, 2005	Socorro	LINEAR	·	2.1 km	MPC · JPL
245354	2005 EW_{256}	—	March 11, 2005	Mount Lemmon	Mount Lemmon Survey	·	2.0 km	MPC · JPL
245355	2005 EL_{263}	—	March 13, 2005	Kitt Peak	Spacewatch	·	3.7 km	MPC · JPL
245356	2005 EY_{265}	—	March 13, 2005	Catalina	CSS	NEM	3.1 km	MPC · JPL
245357	2005 EN_{270}	—	March 13, 2005	Anderson Mesa	LONEOS	TIR	4.3 km	MPC · JPL
245358	2005 EF_{272}	—	March 11, 2005	Junk Bond	Junk Bond	·	1.6 km	MPC · JPL
245359	2005 EO_{272}	—	March 1, 2005	Catalina	CSS	·	2.6 km	MPC · JPL
245360	2005 EA_{281}	—	March 10, 2005	Anderson Mesa	LONEOS	·	5.6 km	MPC · JPL
245361	2005 EH_{324}	—	March 10, 2005	Catalina	CSS	·	2.8 km	MPC · JPL
245362	2005 EC_{331}	—	March 9, 2005	Siding Spring	SSS	·	3.1 km	MPC · JPL
245363	2005 FW_{5}	—	March 31, 2005	Vail-Jarnac	Jarnac	EOS	2.8 km	MPC · JPL
245364	2005 FS_{6}	—	March 30, 2005	Catalina	CSS	·	2.7 km	MPC · JPL
245365	2005 FD_{14}	—	March 19, 2005	Siding Spring	SSS	EUN	1.7 km	MPC · JPL
245366	2005 GS	—	April 1, 2005	Kleť	Kleť	·	4.0 km	MPC · JPL
245367	2005 GV_{5}	—	April 1, 2005	Kitt Peak	Spacewatch	·	3.5 km	MPC · JPL
245368	2005 GW_{18}	—	April 2, 2005	Mount Lemmon	Mount Lemmon Survey	·	1.4 km	MPC · JPL
245369	2005 GV_{31}	—	April 4, 2005	Socorro	LINEAR	EOS	2.5 km	MPC · JPL
245370	2005 GL_{39}	—	April 4, 2005	Mount Lemmon	Mount Lemmon Survey	·	1.8 km	MPC · JPL
245371	2005 GR_{60}	—	April 6, 2005	Anderson Mesa	LONEOS	·	4.9 km	MPC · JPL
245372	2005 GS_{68}	—	April 2, 2005	Catalina	CSS	EUN	1.6 km	MPC · JPL
245373	2005 GH_{73}	—	April 4, 2005	Catalina	CSS	·	3.6 km	MPC · JPL
245374	2005 GY_{73}	—	April 4, 2005	Catalina	CSS	MAR	1.4 km	MPC · JPL
245375	2005 GU_{77}	—	April 6, 2005	Catalina	CSS	·	3.0 km	MPC · JPL
245376	2005 GC_{79}	—	April 6, 2005	Catalina	CSS	·	2.7 km	MPC · JPL
245377	2005 GH_{86}	—	April 4, 2005	Mount Lemmon	Mount Lemmon Survey	·	3.9 km	MPC · JPL
245378	2005 GD_{91}	—	April 6, 2005	Kitt Peak	Spacewatch	·	4.2 km	MPC · JPL
245379	2005 GJ_{93}	—	April 6, 2005	Catalina	CSS	(18466)	3.1 km	MPC · JPL
245380	2005 GT_{99}	—	April 7, 2005	Mount Lemmon	Mount Lemmon Survey	·	4.9 km	MPC · JPL
245381	2005 GO_{105}	—	April 10, 2005	Kitt Peak	Spacewatch	·	2.4 km	MPC · JPL
245382	2005 GA_{108}	—	April 10, 2005	Mount Lemmon	Mount Lemmon Survey	·	5.1 km	MPC · JPL
245383	2005 GS_{108}	—	April 10, 2005	Mount Lemmon	Mount Lemmon Survey	·	6.2 km	MPC · JPL
245384	2005 GT_{109}	—	April 10, 2005	Kitt Peak	Spacewatch	·	2.2 km	MPC · JPL
245385	2005 GZ_{111}	—	April 6, 2005	Anderson Mesa	LONEOS	·	3.2 km	MPC · JPL
245386	2005 GZ_{116}	—	April 11, 2005	Kitt Peak	Spacewatch	·	2.9 km	MPC · JPL
245387	2005 GG_{127}	—	April 12, 2005	Anderson Mesa	LONEOS	·	3.0 km	MPC · JPL
245388	2005 GE_{129}	—	April 7, 2005	Anderson Mesa	LONEOS	·	3.8 km	MPC · JPL
245389	2005 GU_{130}	—	April 8, 2005	Socorro	LINEAR	·	1.9 km	MPC · JPL
245390	2005 GS_{131}	—	April 10, 2005	Kitt Peak	Spacewatch	·	2.1 km	MPC · JPL
245391	2005 GW_{134}	—	April 10, 2005	Mount Lemmon	Mount Lemmon Survey	GEF	1.8 km	MPC · JPL
245392	2005 GC_{162}	—	April 14, 2005	Kitt Peak	Spacewatch	fast	2.2 km	MPC · JPL
245393	2005 GH_{162}	—	April 15, 2005	Catalina	CSS	·	2.1 km	MPC · JPL
245394	2005 GV_{163}	—	April 10, 2005	Mount Lemmon	Mount Lemmon Survey	·	2.0 km	MPC · JPL
245395	2005 GQ_{166}	—	April 11, 2005	Mount Lemmon	Mount Lemmon Survey	·	2.3 km	MPC · JPL
245396	2005 GP_{171}	—	April 12, 2005	Mount Lemmon	Mount Lemmon Survey	·	3.3 km	MPC · JPL
245397	2005 GU_{172}	—	April 14, 2005	Kitt Peak	Spacewatch	AGN	1.4 km	MPC · JPL
245398	2005 GW_{172}	—	April 14, 2005	Kitt Peak	Spacewatch	DOR	2.8 km	MPC · JPL
245399	2005 GQ_{178}	—	April 15, 2005	Kitt Peak	Spacewatch	·	2.6 km	MPC · JPL
245400	2005 GQ_{182}	—	April 1, 2005	Kitt Peak	Spacewatch	·	2.8 km	MPC · JPL

== 245401–245500 ==
back to top

Designation			Discovery			Properties		Ref
Permanent	Provisional	Named after	Date	Site	Discoverer(s)	Category	Diam.	Ref
245401	2005 GO_{184}	—	April 10, 2005	Kitt Peak	M. W. Buie	·	3.0 km	MPC · JPL
245402	2005 GQ_{184}	—	April 10, 2005	Kitt Peak	M. W. Buie	·	1.6 km	MPC · JPL
245403	2005 GF_{207}	—	April 11, 2005	Kitt Peak	Spacewatch	·	3.4 km	MPC · JPL
245404	2005 GV_{208}	—	April 2, 2005	Catalina	CSS	·	2.6 km	MPC · JPL
245405	2005 GU_{214}	—	April 7, 2005	Kitt Peak	Spacewatch	HOF	3.4 km	MPC · JPL
245406	2005 HF_{5}	—	April 30, 2005	Kitt Peak	Spacewatch	·	4.8 km	MPC · JPL
245407	2005 HG_{9}	—	April 16, 2005	Kitt Peak	Spacewatch	·	4.5 km	MPC · JPL
245408	2005 JO	—	May 3, 2005	Kitt Peak	Spacewatch	·	3.4 km	MPC · JPL
245409	2005 JW_{4}	—	May 2, 2005	Kitt Peak	Spacewatch	H	570 m	MPC · JPL
245410	2005 JX_{9}	—	May 4, 2005	Mauna Kea	Veillet, C.	·	2.9 km	MPC · JPL
245411	2005 JO_{15}	—	May 3, 2005	Kitt Peak	Spacewatch	KOR	1.9 km	MPC · JPL
245412	2005 JR_{18}	—	May 4, 2005	Mount Lemmon	Mount Lemmon Survey	DOR	2.7 km	MPC · JPL
245413	2005 JE_{22}	—	May 4, 2005	Cordell-Lorenz	D. T. Durig	·	2.3 km	MPC · JPL
245414	2005 JN_{24}	—	May 3, 2005	Kitt Peak	Spacewatch	·	1.6 km	MPC · JPL
245415	2005 JV_{30}	—	May 4, 2005	Kitt Peak	Spacewatch	·	1.6 km	MPC · JPL
245416	2005 JX_{38}	—	May 7, 2005	Kitt Peak	Spacewatch	·	2.8 km	MPC · JPL
245417 Rostand	2005 JA_{46}	Rostand	May 9, 2005	Saint-Sulpice	B. Christophe	·	1.5 km	MPC · JPL
245418	2005 JX_{47}	—	May 3, 2005	Kitt Peak	Spacewatch	·	4.9 km	MPC · JPL
245419	2005 JS_{48}	—	May 3, 2005	Kitt Peak	Spacewatch	·	4.9 km	MPC · JPL
245420	2005 JL_{52}	—	May 4, 2005	Kitt Peak	Spacewatch	·	3.8 km	MPC · JPL
245421	2005 JW_{63}	—	May 4, 2005	Kitt Peak	Deep Lens Survey	H	630 m	MPC · JPL
245422	2005 JN_{66}	—	May 4, 2005	Palomar	NEAT	(22805)	3.7 km	MPC · JPL
245423	2005 JN_{72}	—	May 8, 2005	Kitt Peak	Spacewatch	KOR	1.6 km	MPC · JPL
245424	2005 JF_{74}	—	May 8, 2005	Anderson Mesa	LONEOS	·	2.3 km	MPC · JPL
245425	2005 JD_{76}	—	May 9, 2005	Mount Lemmon	Mount Lemmon Survey	EUN	1.6 km	MPC · JPL
245426	2005 JA_{84}	—	May 8, 2005	Kitt Peak	Spacewatch	·	3.2 km	MPC · JPL
245427	2005 JL_{89}	—	May 11, 2005	Mount Lemmon	Mount Lemmon Survey	NAE	4.3 km	MPC · JPL
245428	2005 JW_{105}	—	May 11, 2005	Mount Lemmon	Mount Lemmon Survey	·	5.7 km	MPC · JPL
245429	2005 JR_{107}	—	May 12, 2005	Mount Lemmon	Mount Lemmon Survey	·	4.7 km	MPC · JPL
245430	2005 JM_{108}	—	May 10, 2005	Bergisch Gladbach	Bergisch Gladbach	EOS	2.1 km	MPC · JPL
245431	2005 JX_{108}	—	May 6, 2005	Kitt Peak	Deep Lens Survey	EUP	3.9 km	MPC · JPL
245432	2005 JN_{117}	—	May 10, 2005	Kitt Peak	Spacewatch	·	2.6 km	MPC · JPL
245433	2005 JF_{119}	—	May 10, 2005	Kitt Peak	Spacewatch	·	3.5 km	MPC · JPL
245434	2005 JL_{120}	—	May 10, 2005	Kitt Peak	Spacewatch	HYG	4.3 km	MPC · JPL
245435	2005 JZ_{121}	—	May 10, 2005	Kitt Peak	Spacewatch	·	3.0 km	MPC · JPL
245436	2005 JX_{132}	—	May 14, 2005	Kitt Peak	Spacewatch	·	3.8 km	MPC · JPL
245437	2005 JT_{142}	—	May 15, 2005	Palomar	NEAT	·	1.9 km	MPC · JPL
245438	2005 JS_{146}	—	May 14, 2005	Socorro	LINEAR	(10654)	5.9 km	MPC · JPL
245439	2005 JZ_{147}	—	May 15, 2005	Palomar	NEAT	·	2.6 km	MPC · JPL
245440	2005 JO_{154}	—	May 4, 2005	Mount Lemmon	Mount Lemmon Survey	EOS	2.5 km	MPC · JPL
245441	2005 JV_{161}	—	May 8, 2005	Mount Lemmon	Mount Lemmon Survey	KOR	1.7 km	MPC · JPL
245442	2005 JK_{166}	—	May 11, 2005	Catalina	CSS	EOS	3.4 km	MPC · JPL
245443	2005 JP_{174}	—	May 11, 2005	Cerro Tololo	M. W. Buie	KOR	1.6 km	MPC · JPL
245444	2005 JZ_{176}	—	May 8, 2005	Kitt Peak	Spacewatch	·	3.0 km	MPC · JPL
245445	2005 KG_{1}	—	May 16, 2005	Kitt Peak	Spacewatch	·	2.4 km	MPC · JPL
245446	2005 KC_{5}	—	May 18, 2005	Palomar	NEAT	·	3.0 km	MPC · JPL
245447	2005 KK_{5}	—	May 19, 2005	Mount Lemmon	Mount Lemmon Survey	·	4.7 km	MPC · JPL
245448	2005 KH_{8}	—	May 21, 2005	Mount Lemmon	Mount Lemmon Survey	LIX	6.0 km	MPC · JPL
245449	2005 KE_{9}	—	May 21, 2005	Palomar	NEAT	VER	3.9 km	MPC · JPL
245450	2005 LS	—	June 1, 2005	Anderson Mesa	LONEOS	GAL	2.2 km	MPC · JPL
245451	2005 LV	—	June 1, 2005	Bergisch Gladbach	W. Bickel	·	3.7 km	MPC · JPL
245452	2005 LD_{3}	—	June 1, 2005	Socorro	LINEAR	EUP	4.4 km	MPC · JPL
245453	2005 LU_{10}	—	June 3, 2005	Kitt Peak	Spacewatch	·	2.5 km	MPC · JPL
245454	2005 LK_{11}	—	June 3, 2005	Kitt Peak	Spacewatch	HYG	4.0 km	MPC · JPL
245455	2005 LC_{23}	—	June 8, 2005	Kitt Peak	Spacewatch	·	2.8 km	MPC · JPL
245456	2005 LQ_{24}	—	June 6, 2005	Kitt Peak	Spacewatch	·	4.8 km	MPC · JPL
245457	2005 LN_{37}	—	June 11, 2005	Kitt Peak	Spacewatch	·	3.6 km	MPC · JPL
245458	2005 LN_{43}	—	June 10, 2005	Kitt Peak	Spacewatch	·	3.5 km	MPC · JPL
245459	2005 LQ_{43}	—	June 10, 2005	Kitt Peak	Spacewatch	·	4.1 km	MPC · JPL
245460	2005 LU_{46}	—	June 13, 2005	Kitt Peak	Spacewatch	·	2.5 km	MPC · JPL
245461	2005 ME	—	June 16, 2005	Kitt Peak	Spacewatch	·	2.9 km	MPC · JPL
245462	2005 MQ_{12}	—	June 28, 2005	Palomar	NEAT	·	1.8 km	MPC · JPL
245463	2005 MM_{14}	—	June 28, 2005	Palomar	NEAT	·	3.1 km	MPC · JPL
245464	2005 MR_{30}	—	June 29, 2005	Kitt Peak	Spacewatch	·	3.3 km	MPC · JPL
245465	2005 MN_{45}	—	June 27, 2005	Kitt Peak	Spacewatch	·	2.9 km	MPC · JPL
245466	2005 MG_{48}	—	June 29, 2005	Kitt Peak	Spacewatch	·	4.5 km	MPC · JPL
245467	2005 MU_{52}	—	June 30, 2005	Palomar	NEAT	·	4.2 km	MPC · JPL
245468	2005 NF	—	July 1, 2005	Palomar	NEAT	H	950 m	MPC · JPL
245469	2005 NQ_{5}	—	July 3, 2005	Mount Lemmon	Mount Lemmon Survey	·	3.6 km	MPC · JPL
245470	2005 NB_{27}	—	July 5, 2005	Mount Lemmon	Mount Lemmon Survey	·	2.1 km	MPC · JPL
245471	2005 NO_{27}	—	July 5, 2005	Mount Lemmon	Mount Lemmon Survey	·	2.5 km	MPC · JPL
245472	2005 NH_{41}	—	July 4, 2005	Mount Lemmon	Mount Lemmon Survey	·	3.3 km	MPC · JPL
245473	2005 NU_{57}	—	July 5, 2005	Mount Lemmon	Mount Lemmon Survey	H	880 m	MPC · JPL
245474	2005 NP_{59}	—	July 9, 2005	Kitt Peak	Spacewatch	CYB	6.3 km	MPC · JPL
245475	2005 NF_{64}	—	July 1, 2005	Kitt Peak	Spacewatch	·	4.4 km	MPC · JPL
245476	2005 NJ_{64}	—	July 1, 2005	Kitt Peak	Spacewatch	·	6.6 km	MPC · JPL
245477	2005 NN_{66}	—	July 2, 2005	Kitt Peak	Spacewatch	·	2.1 km	MPC · JPL
245478	2005 NO_{66}	—	July 2, 2005	Kitt Peak	Spacewatch	·	2.6 km	MPC · JPL
245479	2005 NQ_{93}	—	July 6, 2005	Kitt Peak	Spacewatch	ELF	4.4 km	MPC · JPL
245480	2005 NM_{95}	—	July 7, 2005	Kitt Peak	Spacewatch	·	3.5 km	MPC · JPL
245481	2005 NC_{123}	—	July 5, 2005	Siding Spring	SSS	·	2.2 km	MPC · JPL
245482	2005 OP_{3}	—	July 28, 2005	Reedy Creek	J. Broughton	·	4.6 km	MPC · JPL
245483	2005 OA_{9}	—	July 31, 2005	Socorro	LINEAR	·	5.7 km	MPC · JPL
245484	2005 OZ_{23}	—	July 30, 2005	Palomar	NEAT	·	4.4 km	MPC · JPL
245485	2005 PP_{10}	—	August 4, 2005	Palomar	NEAT	·	3.6 km	MPC · JPL
245486	2005 PF_{17}	—	August 13, 2005	Wrightwood	J. W. Young	·	1.6 km	MPC · JPL
245487	2005 PL_{18}	—	August 11, 2005	Reedy Creek	J. Broughton	·	5.3 km	MPC · JPL
245488	2005 QL_{11}	—	August 25, 2005	Palomar	NEAT	VER	4.8 km	MPC · JPL
245489	2005 QY_{17}	—	August 25, 2005	Palomar	NEAT	NYS ·	1.9 km	MPC · JPL
245490	2005 QR_{31}	—	August 23, 2005	Costitx	OAM	·	5.9 km	MPC · JPL
245491	2005 QZ_{38}	—	August 25, 2005	Campo Imperatore	CINEOS	·	3.4 km	MPC · JPL
245492	2005 QT_{40}	—	August 26, 2005	Palomar	NEAT	·	3.4 km	MPC · JPL
245493	2005 QT_{51}	—	August 27, 2005	Anderson Mesa	LONEOS	·	3.9 km	MPC · JPL
245494	2005 QX_{56}	—	August 29, 2005	Gnosca	S. Sposetti	VER	7.0 km	MPC · JPL
245495	2005 QY_{76}	—	August 30, 2005	Vail-Jarnac	Jarnac	·	3.6 km	MPC · JPL
245496	2005 QS_{85}	—	August 30, 2005	Socorro	LINEAR	·	3.4 km	MPC · JPL
245497	2005 QQ_{102}	—	August 27, 2005	Palomar	NEAT	·	3.0 km	MPC · JPL
245498	2005 QK_{144}	—	August 26, 2005	Palomar	NEAT	·	4.2 km	MPC · JPL
245499	2005 QF_{156}	—	August 30, 2005	Palomar	NEAT	·	5.1 km	MPC · JPL
245500	2005 QQ_{156}	—	August 30, 2005	Palomar	NEAT	URS	6.6 km	MPC · JPL

== 245501–245600 ==
back to top

Designation			Discovery			Properties		Ref
Permanent	Provisional	Named after	Date	Site	Discoverer(s)	Category	Diam.	Ref
245501	2005 QC_{157}	—	August 30, 2005	Palomar	NEAT	·	3.1 km	MPC · JPL
245502	2005 QF_{166}	—	August 29, 2005	Palomar	NEAT	H	790 m	MPC · JPL
245503	2005 QL_{167}	—	August 27, 2005	Palomar	NEAT	·	4.1 km	MPC · JPL
245504	2005 QC_{169}	—	August 29, 2005	Palomar	NEAT	·	3.7 km	MPC · JPL
245505	2005 QV_{181}	—	August 31, 2005	Anderson Mesa	LONEOS	·	4.9 km	MPC · JPL
245506	2005 RV	—	September 2, 2005	Consell	Observatorio Astronómico de Consell	URS	5.0 km	MPC · JPL
245507	2005 RD_{24}	—	September 11, 2005	Anderson Mesa	LONEOS	·	2.3 km	MPC · JPL
245508	2005 RJ_{24}	—	September 11, 2005	Anderson Mesa	LONEOS	·	3.6 km	MPC · JPL
245509	2005 RM_{32}	—	September 13, 2005	Socorro	LINEAR	·	5.4 km	MPC · JPL
245510	2005 SK_{2}	—	September 23, 2005	Kitt Peak	Spacewatch	·	3.0 km	MPC · JPL
245511	2005 SY_{42}	—	September 24, 2005	Kitt Peak	Spacewatch	·	5.3 km	MPC · JPL
245512	2005 SQ_{54}	—	September 25, 2005	Kitt Peak	Spacewatch	·	3.2 km	MPC · JPL
245513	2005 SY_{56}	—	September 26, 2005	Palomar	NEAT	·	6.8 km	MPC · JPL
245514	2005 SY_{61}	—	September 26, 2005	Kitt Peak	Spacewatch	·	2.6 km	MPC · JPL
245515	2005 SE_{72}	—	September 23, 2005	Catalina	CSS	·	2.6 km	MPC · JPL
245516	2005 SG_{72}	—	September 23, 2005	Catalina	CSS	NAE	5.1 km	MPC · JPL
245517	2005 SE_{90}	—	September 24, 2005	Kitt Peak	Spacewatch	EOS	2.8 km	MPC · JPL
245518	2005 SR_{103}	—	September 25, 2005	Palomar	NEAT	·	910 m	MPC · JPL
245519	2005 SQ_{104}	—	September 25, 2005	Kitt Peak	Spacewatch	·	2.5 km	MPC · JPL
245520	2005 SM_{107}	—	September 26, 2005	Catalina	CSS	·	5.5 km	MPC · JPL
245521	2005 SG_{113}	—	September 26, 2005	Črni Vrh	Matičič, S.	URS	6.0 km	MPC · JPL
245522	2005 SP_{124}	—	September 29, 2005	Kitt Peak	Spacewatch	·	3.8 km	MPC · JPL
245523	2005 SY_{144}	—	September 25, 2005	Kitt Peak	Spacewatch	THM	2.7 km	MPC · JPL
245524	2005 SM_{153}	—	September 25, 2005	Kitt Peak	Spacewatch	NAE	4.8 km	MPC · JPL
245525	2005 SD_{167}	—	September 28, 2005	Palomar	NEAT	·	3.2 km	MPC · JPL
245526	2005 SN_{167}	—	September 28, 2005	Palomar	NEAT	·	3.7 km	MPC · JPL
245527	2005 SY_{177}	—	September 29, 2005	Kitt Peak	Spacewatch	·	1.3 km	MPC · JPL
245528	2005 SG_{178}	—	September 29, 2005	Catalina	CSS	H	820 m	MPC · JPL
245529	2005 SR_{197}	—	September 30, 2005	Palomar	NEAT	·	3.9 km	MPC · JPL
245530	2005 SE_{202}	—	September 30, 2005	Palomar	NEAT	SYL · CYB	7.7 km	MPC · JPL
245531	2005 SF_{208}	—	September 30, 2005	Kitt Peak	Spacewatch	·	6.4 km	MPC · JPL
245532	2005 SZ_{214}	—	September 30, 2005	Catalina	CSS	·	5.8 km	MPC · JPL
245533	2005 SV_{219}	—	September 27, 2005	Socorro	LINEAR	·	5.1 km	MPC · JPL
245534	2005 SX_{272}	—	September 30, 2005	Anderson Mesa	LONEOS	·	4.8 km	MPC · JPL
245535	2005 SV_{281}	—	September 25, 2005	Kitt Peak	Spacewatch	·	3.6 km	MPC · JPL
245536	2005 SR_{285}	—	September 25, 2005	Apache Point	A. C. Becker	·	5.2 km	MPC · JPL
245537	2005 TW_{26}	—	October 1, 2005	Mount Lemmon	Mount Lemmon Survey	·	2.5 km	MPC · JPL
245538	2005 TE_{46}	—	October 2, 2005	Siding Spring	SSS	H	980 m	MPC · JPL
245539	2005 TO_{52}	—	October 12, 2005	Calvin-Rehoboth	L. A. Molnar	THM	2.5 km	MPC · JPL
245540	2005 TX_{75}	—	October 4, 2005	Palomar	NEAT	·	1.5 km	MPC · JPL
245541	2005 TA_{86}	—	October 3, 2005	Socorro	LINEAR	·	2.1 km	MPC · JPL
245542	2005 TE_{88}	—	October 5, 2005	Socorro	LINEAR	NYS	1.5 km	MPC · JPL
245543	2005 TA_{105}	—	October 8, 2005	Socorro	LINEAR	·	5.8 km	MPC · JPL
245544	2005 TB_{167}	—	October 9, 2005	Kitt Peak	Spacewatch	·	4.7 km	MPC · JPL
245545	2005 TC_{170}	—	October 10, 2005	Kitt Peak	Spacewatch	·	3.3 km	MPC · JPL
245546	2005 TN_{172}	—	October 12, 2005	Anderson Mesa	LONEOS	·	5.4 km	MPC · JPL
245547	2005 TO_{172}	—	October 12, 2005	Socorro	LINEAR	·	1.1 km	MPC · JPL
245548	2005 TD_{192}	—	October 7, 2005	Mauna Kea	Mauna Kea	V	820 m	MPC · JPL
245549	2005 TE_{192}	—	October 7, 2005	Mauna Kea	Mauna Kea	·	1.2 km	MPC · JPL
245550	2005 UP_{5}	—	October 25, 2005	Socorro	LINEAR	·	5.3 km	MPC · JPL
245551	2005 UU_{5}	—	October 27, 2005	Socorro	LINEAR	·	5.0 km	MPC · JPL
245552	2005 UF_{8}	—	October 27, 2005	Ottmarsheim	C. Rinner	·	1.3 km	MPC · JPL
245553	2005 UG_{10}	—	October 21, 2005	Palomar	NEAT	·	4.9 km	MPC · JPL
245554	2005 UL_{16}	—	October 22, 2005	Kitt Peak	Spacewatch	EUP	5.8 km	MPC · JPL
245555	2005 UU_{54}	—	October 23, 2005	Catalina	CSS	·	1.2 km	MPC · JPL
245556	2005 UE_{57}	—	October 24, 2005	Anderson Mesa	LONEOS	·	5.0 km	MPC · JPL
245557	2005 UE_{59}	—	October 24, 2005	Kitt Peak	Spacewatch	(31811)	3.7 km	MPC · JPL
245558	2005 UM_{74}	—	October 23, 2005	Palomar	NEAT	EOS	3.0 km	MPC · JPL
245559	2005 UJ_{75}	—	October 24, 2005	Palomar	NEAT	·	4.9 km	MPC · JPL
245560	2005 UD_{80}	—	October 25, 2005	Catalina	CSS	·	1.2 km	MPC · JPL
245561	2005 UP_{81}	—	October 21, 2005	Palomar	NEAT	·	4.4 km	MPC · JPL
245562	2005 UQ_{107}	—	October 22, 2005	Palomar	NEAT	·	3.4 km	MPC · JPL
245563	2005 UF_{109}	—	October 22, 2005	Palomar	NEAT	·	3.2 km	MPC · JPL
245564	2005 UE_{110}	—	October 22, 2005	Kitt Peak	Spacewatch	·	690 m	MPC · JPL
245565	2005 UF_{116}	—	October 23, 2005	Catalina	CSS	·	4.1 km	MPC · JPL
245566	2005 UQ_{117}	—	October 24, 2005	Kitt Peak	Spacewatch	·	3.5 km	MPC · JPL
245567	2005 UM_{127}	—	October 24, 2005	Kitt Peak	Spacewatch	·	3.2 km	MPC · JPL
245568	2005 UR_{150}	—	October 26, 2005	Goodricke-Pigott	R. A. Tucker	·	1.1 km	MPC · JPL
245569	2005 UY_{153}	—	October 26, 2005	Kitt Peak	Spacewatch	THM	2.8 km	MPC · JPL
245570	2005 UT_{155}	—	October 26, 2005	Palomar	NEAT	·	2.5 km	MPC · JPL
245571	2005 UF_{160}	—	October 22, 2005	Catalina	CSS	·	1 km	MPC · JPL
245572	2005 US_{196}	—	October 24, 2005	Kitt Peak	Spacewatch	·	3.4 km	MPC · JPL
245573	2005 UH_{224}	—	October 25, 2005	Kitt Peak	Spacewatch	·	4.3 km	MPC · JPL
245574	2005 UF_{252}	—	October 26, 2005	Anderson Mesa	LONEOS	·	6.1 km	MPC · JPL
245575	2005 UA_{254}	—	October 28, 2005	Kitt Peak	Spacewatch	·	1.1 km	MPC · JPL
245576	2005 UL_{274}	—	October 25, 2005	Catalina	CSS	EOS	2.9 km	MPC · JPL
245577	2005 UQ_{283}	—	October 26, 2005	Kitt Peak	Spacewatch	·	4.3 km	MPC · JPL
245578	2005 UQ_{336}	—	October 30, 2005	Mount Lemmon	Mount Lemmon Survey	3:2	7.4 km	MPC · JPL
245579	2005 UD_{343}	—	October 31, 2005	Catalina	CSS	PHO	2.6 km	MPC · JPL
245580	2005 UT_{348}	—	October 23, 2005	Catalina	CSS	·	5.6 km	MPC · JPL
245581	2005 UM_{352}	—	October 29, 2005	Catalina	CSS	·	4.0 km	MPC · JPL
245582	2005 UZ_{352}	—	October 29, 2005	Catalina	CSS	·	4.9 km	MPC · JPL
245583	2005 UD_{354}	—	October 29, 2005	Kitt Peak	Spacewatch	·	3.5 km	MPC · JPL
245584	2005 UG_{373}	—	October 27, 2005	Kitt Peak	Spacewatch	·	1.5 km	MPC · JPL
245585	2005 UZ_{380}	—	October 30, 2005	Mount Lemmon	Mount Lemmon Survey	·	4.4 km	MPC · JPL
245586	2005 UV_{384}	—	October 27, 2005	Palomar	NEAT	·	2.4 km	MPC · JPL
245587	2005 UL_{391}	—	October 30, 2005	Mount Lemmon	Mount Lemmon Survey	·	3.8 km	MPC · JPL
245588	2005 UM_{399}	—	October 31, 2005	Kitt Peak	Spacewatch	·	3.2 km	MPC · JPL
245589	2005 UX_{399}	—	October 25, 2005	Mount Lemmon	Mount Lemmon Survey	·	890 m	MPC · JPL
245590	2005 UD_{485}	—	October 22, 2005	Catalina	CSS	·	3.7 km	MPC · JPL
245591	2005 UU_{492}	—	October 25, 2005	Catalina	CSS	TIR	2.6 km	MPC · JPL
245592	2005 US_{500}	—	October 27, 2005	Catalina	CSS	LIX	4.9 km	MPC · JPL
245593	2005 VL_{15}	—	November 1, 2005	Socorro	LINEAR	·	4.5 km	MPC · JPL
245594	2005 VD_{17}	—	November 3, 2005	Mount Lemmon	Mount Lemmon Survey	·	3.7 km	MPC · JPL
245595	2005 VW_{27}	—	November 3, 2005	Mount Lemmon	Mount Lemmon Survey	·	4.1 km	MPC · JPL
245596	2005 VN_{72}	—	November 1, 2005	Mount Lemmon	Mount Lemmon Survey	(8737)	4.9 km	MPC · JPL
245597	2005 VM_{78}	—	November 6, 2005	Socorro	LINEAR	EOS	3.3 km	MPC · JPL
245598	2005 VW_{82}	—	November 3, 2005	Mount Lemmon	Mount Lemmon Survey	·	3.6 km	MPC · JPL
245599	2005 VG_{110}	—	November 6, 2005	Mount Lemmon	Mount Lemmon Survey	·	1.2 km	MPC · JPL
245600	2005 VD_{124}	—	November 5, 2005	Catalina	CSS	·	5.5 km	MPC · JPL

== 245601–245700 ==
back to top

Designation			Discovery			Properties		Ref
Permanent	Provisional	Named after	Date	Site	Discoverer(s)	Category	Diam.	Ref
245601	2005 VF_{124}	—	November 6, 2005	Kitt Peak	Spacewatch	V	800 m	MPC · JPL
245602	2005 WR_{1}	—	November 21, 2005	Socorro	LINEAR	·	6.9 km	MPC · JPL
245603	2005 WP_{2}	—	November 22, 2005	Socorro	LINEAR	·	6.9 km	MPC · JPL
245604	2005 WU_{7}	—	November 21, 2005	Catalina	CSS	·	1.3 km	MPC · JPL
245605	2005 WG_{28}	—	November 21, 2005	Kitt Peak	Spacewatch	·	1.2 km	MPC · JPL
245606	2005 WK_{32}	—	November 21, 2005	Kitt Peak	Spacewatch	·	4.2 km	MPC · JPL
245607	2005 WE_{36}	—	November 22, 2005	Kitt Peak	Spacewatch	·	6.5 km	MPC · JPL
245608	2005 WP_{36}	—	November 22, 2005	Kitt Peak	Spacewatch	THM	5.0 km	MPC · JPL
245609	2005 WF_{39}	—	November 25, 2005	Mount Lemmon	Mount Lemmon Survey	(159)	3.9 km	MPC · JPL
245610	2005 WN_{43}	—	November 21, 2005	Kitt Peak	Spacewatch	·	4.7 km	MPC · JPL
245611	2005 WP_{43}	—	November 21, 2005	Kitt Peak	Spacewatch	·	2.6 km	MPC · JPL
245612	2005 WK_{71}	—	November 21, 2005	Catalina	CSS	·	4.0 km	MPC · JPL
245613	2005 WS_{71}	—	November 21, 2005	Palomar	NEAT	·	1.5 km	MPC · JPL
245614	2005 WR_{81}	—	November 28, 2005	Socorro	LINEAR	·	4.4 km	MPC · JPL
245615	2005 WW_{98}	—	November 28, 2005	Mount Lemmon	Mount Lemmon Survey	·	1.3 km	MPC · JPL
245616	2005 WU_{115}	—	November 30, 2005	Anderson Mesa	LONEOS	KON	3.5 km	MPC · JPL
245617	2005 WZ_{120}	—	November 30, 2005	Kitt Peak	Spacewatch	·	1.2 km	MPC · JPL
245618	2005 WP_{134}	—	November 25, 2005	Mount Lemmon	Mount Lemmon Survey	·	800 m	MPC · JPL
245619	2005 WA_{144}	—	November 30, 2005	Kitt Peak	Spacewatch	·	580 m	MPC · JPL
245620	2005 WL_{149}	—	November 28, 2005	Kitt Peak	Spacewatch	·	1.5 km	MPC · JPL
245621	2005 WZ_{160}	—	November 28, 2005	Socorro	LINEAR	·	1.4 km	MPC · JPL
245622	2005 WK_{163}	—	November 29, 2005	Kitt Peak	Spacewatch	·	4.7 km	MPC · JPL
245623	2005 WD_{180}	—	November 21, 2005	Catalina	CSS	·	1.7 km	MPC · JPL
245624	2005 WH_{182}	—	November 25, 2005	Catalina	CSS	·	6.3 km	MPC · JPL
245625	2005 WM_{193}	—	November 28, 2005	Catalina	CSS	EOS	3.9 km	MPC · JPL
245626	2005 WE_{208}	—	November 25, 2005	Kitt Peak	Spacewatch	·	4.3 km	MPC · JPL
245627	2005 XV_{4}	—	December 4, 2005	Socorro	LINEAR	H	860 m	MPC · JPL
245628	2005 XV_{16}	—	December 1, 2005	Mount Lemmon	Mount Lemmon Survey	·	980 m	MPC · JPL
245629	2005 XK_{27}	—	December 6, 2005	Junk Bond	D. Healy	·	780 m	MPC · JPL
245630	2005 XM_{47}	—	December 2, 2005	Kitt Peak	Spacewatch	·	840 m	MPC · JPL
245631	2005 XR_{51}	—	December 2, 2005	Kitt Peak	Spacewatch	·	1.7 km	MPC · JPL
245632	2005 XC_{54}	—	December 4, 2005	Kitt Peak	Spacewatch	·	880 m	MPC · JPL
245633	2005 XK_{55}	—	December 5, 2005	Catalina	CSS	·	3.9 km	MPC · JPL
245634	2005 XD_{87}	—	December 10, 2005	Kitt Peak	Spacewatch	·	850 m	MPC · JPL
245635	2005 YQ	—	December 21, 2005	Catalina	CSS	H	840 m	MPC · JPL
245636	2005 YG_{6}	—	December 21, 2005	Kitt Peak	Spacewatch	·	990 m	MPC · JPL
245637	2005 YZ_{8}	—	December 20, 2005	Junk Bond	D. Healy	·	790 m	MPC · JPL
245638	2005 YK_{14}	—	December 22, 2005	Kitt Peak	Spacewatch	·	4.9 km	MPC · JPL
245639	2005 YS_{20}	—	December 24, 2005	Kitt Peak	Spacewatch	THM	4.3 km	MPC · JPL
245640	2005 YA_{30}	—	December 25, 2005	Kitt Peak	Spacewatch	·	2.2 km	MPC · JPL
245641	2005 YC_{49}	—	December 22, 2005	Kitt Peak	Spacewatch	·	3.4 km	MPC · JPL
245642	2005 YZ_{82}	—	December 24, 2005	Kitt Peak	Spacewatch	·	960 m	MPC · JPL
245643	2005 YA_{84}	—	December 24, 2005	Kitt Peak	Spacewatch	·	890 m	MPC · JPL
245644	2005 YP_{95}	—	December 25, 2005	Kitt Peak	Spacewatch	·	1.5 km	MPC · JPL
245645	2005 YY_{100}	—	December 24, 2005	Kitt Peak	Spacewatch	NYS	1.5 km	MPC · JPL
245646	2005 YH_{110}	—	December 25, 2005	Kitt Peak	Spacewatch	·	1.3 km	MPC · JPL
245647	2005 YJ_{127}	—	December 28, 2005	Kitt Peak	Spacewatch	·	860 m	MPC · JPL
245648	2005 YT_{129}	—	December 24, 2005	Kitt Peak	Spacewatch	·	810 m	MPC · JPL
245649	2005 YS_{131}	—	December 25, 2005	Mount Lemmon	Mount Lemmon Survey	NYS	1.1 km	MPC · JPL
245650	2005 YL_{139}	—	December 28, 2005	Kitt Peak	Spacewatch	·	760 m	MPC · JPL
245651	2005 YH_{143}	—	December 28, 2005	Mount Lemmon	Mount Lemmon Survey	ERI	2.5 km	MPC · JPL
245652	2005 YD_{146}	—	December 29, 2005	Mount Lemmon	Mount Lemmon Survey	·	790 m	MPC · JPL
245653	2005 YH_{150}	—	December 25, 2005	Kitt Peak	Spacewatch	·	5.3 km	MPC · JPL
245654	2005 YB_{156}	—	December 25, 2005	Mount Lemmon	Mount Lemmon Survey	(2076)	1.2 km	MPC · JPL
245655	2005 YM_{204}	—	December 25, 2005	Mount Lemmon	Mount Lemmon Survey	NYS	1.2 km	MPC · JPL
245656	2005 YM_{209}	—	December 23, 2005	Socorro	LINEAR	PHO	1.6 km	MPC · JPL
245657	2005 YZ_{212}	—	December 29, 2005	Catalina	CSS	·	1.8 km	MPC · JPL
245658	2005 YC_{215}	—	December 31, 2005	Socorro	LINEAR	·	980 m	MPC · JPL
245659	2005 YH_{257}	—	December 30, 2005	Kitt Peak	Spacewatch	·	1.6 km	MPC · JPL
245660	2005 YB_{279}	—	December 25, 2005	Mount Lemmon	Mount Lemmon Survey	·	3.7 km	MPC · JPL
245661	2005 YX_{280}	—	December 25, 2005	Mount Lemmon	Mount Lemmon Survey	·	740 m	MPC · JPL
245662	2006 AV_{1}	—	January 2, 2006	Mount Lemmon	Mount Lemmon Survey	PHO	1.5 km	MPC · JPL
245663	2006 AC_{17}	—	January 5, 2006	Kitt Peak	Spacewatch	·	1.5 km	MPC · JPL
245664	2006 AU_{31}	—	January 5, 2006	Catalina	CSS	·	850 m	MPC · JPL
245665	2006 AE_{64}	—	January 7, 2006	Mount Lemmon	Mount Lemmon Survey	·	2.3 km	MPC · JPL
245666	2006 AO_{64}	—	January 7, 2006	Mount Lemmon	Mount Lemmon Survey	·	3.7 km	MPC · JPL
245667	2006 AR_{82}	—	January 7, 2006	Catalina	CSS	·	2.1 km	MPC · JPL
245668	2006 AQ_{84}	—	January 6, 2006	Socorro	LINEAR	·	4.5 km	MPC · JPL
245669	2006 BE_{2}	—	January 20, 2006	Kitt Peak	Spacewatch	MAS	750 m	MPC · JPL
245670	2006 BD_{10}	—	January 19, 2006	Catalina	CSS	·	2.7 km	MPC · JPL
245671	2006 BF_{11}	—	January 20, 2006	Kitt Peak	Spacewatch	·	830 m	MPC · JPL
245672	2006 BP_{24}	—	January 23, 2006	Mount Lemmon	Mount Lemmon Survey	·	1.4 km	MPC · JPL
245673	2006 BP_{25}	—	January 23, 2006	Mount Lemmon	Mount Lemmon Survey	·	1.2 km	MPC · JPL
245674	2006 BN_{27}	—	January 22, 2006	Mount Lemmon	Mount Lemmon Survey	·	770 m	MPC · JPL
245675	2006 BX_{31}	—	January 20, 2006	Kitt Peak	Spacewatch	·	1.6 km	MPC · JPL
245676	2006 BZ_{31}	—	January 20, 2006	Kitt Peak	Spacewatch	·	1.9 km	MPC · JPL
245677	2006 BA_{41}	—	January 21, 2006	Mount Lemmon	Mount Lemmon Survey	·	820 m	MPC · JPL
245678	2006 BV_{51}	—	January 25, 2006	Kitt Peak	Spacewatch	·	2.7 km	MPC · JPL
245679	2006 BJ_{82}	—	January 23, 2006	Kitt Peak	Spacewatch	·	3.9 km	MPC · JPL
245680	2006 BL_{84}	—	January 25, 2006	Kitt Peak	Spacewatch	V	680 m	MPC · JPL
245681	2006 BN_{90}	—	January 25, 2006	Kitt Peak	Spacewatch	·	850 m	MPC · JPL
245682	2006 BS_{91}	—	January 26, 2006	Kitt Peak	Spacewatch	L5	9.6 km	MPC · JPL
245683	2006 BU_{95}	—	January 26, 2006	Kitt Peak	Spacewatch	MAS	830 m	MPC · JPL
245684	2006 BK_{96}	—	January 26, 2006	Kitt Peak	Spacewatch	·	1.6 km	MPC · JPL
245685	2006 BC_{116}	—	January 26, 2006	Kitt Peak	Spacewatch	NYS	1.2 km	MPC · JPL
245686	2006 BR_{116}	—	January 26, 2006	Kitt Peak	Spacewatch	·	1 km	MPC · JPL
245687	2006 BQ_{129}	—	January 26, 2006	Mount Lemmon	Mount Lemmon Survey	·	820 m	MPC · JPL
245688	2006 BP_{131}	—	January 26, 2006	Mount Lemmon	Mount Lemmon Survey	EUN · slow	1.5 km	MPC · JPL
245689	2006 BD_{133}	—	January 26, 2006	Kitt Peak	Spacewatch	·	1.2 km	MPC · JPL
245690	2006 BT_{133}	—	January 26, 2006	Mount Lemmon	Mount Lemmon Survey	·	1.4 km	MPC · JPL
245691	2006 BV_{148}	—	January 22, 2006	Mount Lemmon	Mount Lemmon Survey	NEM	2.6 km	MPC · JPL
245692	2006 BB_{158}	—	January 25, 2006	Kitt Peak	Spacewatch	·	1.4 km	MPC · JPL
245693	2006 BC_{165}	—	January 26, 2006	Kitt Peak	Spacewatch	·	1.3 km	MPC · JPL
245694	2006 BQ_{167}	—	January 26, 2006	Mount Lemmon	Mount Lemmon Survey	·	1.0 km	MPC · JPL
245695	2006 BA_{170}	—	January 26, 2006	Mount Lemmon	Mount Lemmon Survey	·	1.0 km	MPC · JPL
245696	2006 BT_{185}	—	January 28, 2006	Mount Lemmon	Mount Lemmon Survey	·	1.5 km	MPC · JPL
245697	2006 BL_{187}	—	January 28, 2006	Kitt Peak	Spacewatch	NYS	1.7 km	MPC · JPL
245698	2006 BM_{208}	—	January 31, 2006	Catalina	CSS	·	2.5 km	MPC · JPL
245699	2006 BO_{219}	—	January 28, 2006	Anderson Mesa	LONEOS	·	1.8 km	MPC · JPL
245700	2006 BU_{224}	—	January 30, 2006	Kitt Peak	Spacewatch	HOF	3.1 km	MPC · JPL

== 245701–245800 ==
back to top

Designation			Discovery			Properties		Ref
Permanent	Provisional	Named after	Date	Site	Discoverer(s)	Category	Diam.	Ref
245701	2006 BP_{244}	—	January 31, 2006	Kitt Peak	Spacewatch	·	1.7 km	MPC · JPL
245702	2006 BC_{247}	—	January 31, 2006	Kitt Peak	Spacewatch	·	850 m	MPC · JPL
245703	2006 BX_{248}	—	January 31, 2006	Kitt Peak	Spacewatch	·	1.1 km	MPC · JPL
245704	2006 BV_{264}	—	January 31, 2006	Kitt Peak	Spacewatch	·	1.7 km	MPC · JPL
245705	2006 BJ_{271}	—	January 31, 2006	Kitt Peak	Spacewatch	ERI	2.1 km	MPC · JPL
245706	2006 BE_{274}	—	January 23, 2006	Kitt Peak	Spacewatch	·	5.5 km	MPC · JPL
245707	2006 BG_{275}	—	January 28, 2006	Mount Lemmon	Mount Lemmon Survey	·	3.2 km	MPC · JPL
245708	2006 CD_{13}	—	February 1, 2006	Kitt Peak	Spacewatch	·	1 km	MPC · JPL
245709	2006 CX_{17}	—	February 1, 2006	Kitt Peak	Spacewatch	·	1.1 km	MPC · JPL
245710	2006 CX_{22}	—	February 1, 2006	Kitt Peak	Spacewatch	·	2.8 km	MPC · JPL
245711	2006 CF_{26}	—	February 2, 2006	Kitt Peak	Spacewatch	NYS	1.2 km	MPC · JPL
245712	2006 CQ_{33}	—	February 2, 2006	Mount Lemmon	Mount Lemmon Survey	·	3.5 km	MPC · JPL
245713	2006 CY_{33}	—	February 2, 2006	Mount Lemmon	Mount Lemmon Survey	NEM	2.1 km	MPC · JPL
245714	2006 CM_{44}	—	February 3, 2006	Kitt Peak	Spacewatch	MAS	700 m	MPC · JPL
245715	2006 CL_{49}	—	February 3, 2006	Socorro	LINEAR	MAS	870 m	MPC · JPL
245716	2006 CQ_{59}	—	February 6, 2006	Mount Lemmon	Mount Lemmon Survey	MAS	760 m	MPC · JPL
245717	2006 CW_{59}	—	February 6, 2006	Mount Lemmon	Mount Lemmon Survey	·	810 m	MPC · JPL
245718	2006 CY_{59}	—	February 6, 2006	Kitt Peak	Spacewatch	·	1.2 km	MPC · JPL
245719	2006 CK_{66}	—	February 1, 2006	Kitt Peak	Spacewatch	·	1.8 km	MPC · JPL
245720	2006 DO_{6}	—	February 20, 2006	Kitt Peak	Spacewatch	·	1.1 km	MPC · JPL
245721	2006 DT_{7}	—	February 20, 2006	Kitt Peak	Spacewatch	NYS	1.4 km	MPC · JPL
245722	2006 DT_{12}	—	February 21, 2006	Mount Lemmon	Mount Lemmon Survey	NYS	1.1 km	MPC · JPL
245723	2006 DR_{13}	—	February 22, 2006	Catalina	CSS	·	4.8 km	MPC · JPL
245724	2006 DA_{16}	—	February 20, 2006	Kitt Peak	Spacewatch	·	1.1 km	MPC · JPL
245725	2006 DB_{28}	—	February 20, 2006	Kitt Peak	Spacewatch	·	1.1 km	MPC · JPL
245726	2006 DS_{29}	—	February 20, 2006	Kitt Peak	Spacewatch	NYS	1.3 km	MPC · JPL
245727	2006 DV_{34}	—	February 20, 2006	Mount Lemmon	Mount Lemmon Survey	·	1.6 km	MPC · JPL
245728	2006 DO_{48}	—	February 21, 2006	Mount Lemmon	Mount Lemmon Survey	·	1.1 km	MPC · JPL
245729	2006 DX_{48}	—	February 21, 2006	Mount Lemmon	Mount Lemmon Survey	·	1.3 km	MPC · JPL
245730	2006 DU_{50}	—	February 23, 2006	Kitt Peak	Spacewatch	·	840 m	MPC · JPL
245731	2006 DR_{54}	—	February 24, 2006	Kitt Peak	Spacewatch	·	1.0 km	MPC · JPL
245732	2006 DB_{64}	—	February 20, 2006	Catalina	CSS	NYS	1.2 km	MPC · JPL
245733	2006 DR_{69}	—	February 20, 2006	Mount Lemmon	Mount Lemmon Survey	·	5.1 km	MPC · JPL
245734	2006 DF_{71}	—	February 21, 2006	Mount Lemmon	Mount Lemmon Survey	MAS	760 m	MPC · JPL
245735	2006 DM_{83}	—	February 24, 2006	Kitt Peak	Spacewatch	·	1.3 km	MPC · JPL
245736	2006 DU_{107}	—	February 25, 2006	Kitt Peak	Spacewatch	·	1.4 km	MPC · JPL
245737	2006 DT_{108}	—	February 25, 2006	Kitt Peak	Spacewatch	·	1.5 km	MPC · JPL
245738	2006 DK_{110}	—	February 25, 2006	Kitt Peak	Spacewatch	·	1.5 km	MPC · JPL
245739	2006 DR_{115}	—	February 27, 2006	Kitt Peak	Spacewatch	·	920 m	MPC · JPL
245740	2006 DK_{122}	—	February 23, 2006	Anderson Mesa	LONEOS	PHO · fast	1.8 km	MPC · JPL
245741	2006 DM_{138}	—	February 25, 2006	Kitt Peak	Spacewatch	·	1.8 km	MPC · JPL
245742	2006 DS_{139}	—	February 25, 2006	Kitt Peak	Spacewatch	·	1.0 km	MPC · JPL
245743	2006 DL_{140}	—	February 25, 2006	Kitt Peak	Spacewatch	·	1.3 km	MPC · JPL
245744	2006 DC_{141}	—	February 25, 2006	Kitt Peak	Spacewatch	·	920 m	MPC · JPL
245745	2006 DA_{142}	—	February 25, 2006	Kitt Peak	Spacewatch	·	4.1 km	MPC · JPL
245746	2006 DL_{143}	—	February 25, 2006	Mount Lemmon	Mount Lemmon Survey	·	750 m	MPC · JPL
245747	2006 DK_{145}	—	February 25, 2006	Mount Lemmon	Mount Lemmon Survey	·	1.2 km	MPC · JPL
245748	2006 DM_{153}	—	February 25, 2006	Kitt Peak	Spacewatch	·	960 m	MPC · JPL
245749	2006 DD_{160}	—	February 27, 2006	Kitt Peak	Spacewatch	·	1.3 km	MPC · JPL
245750	2006 DQ_{162}	—	February 27, 2006	Mount Lemmon	Mount Lemmon Survey	·	4.1 km	MPC · JPL
245751	2006 DT_{181}	—	February 27, 2006	Kitt Peak	Spacewatch	·	2.0 km	MPC · JPL
245752	2006 DY_{184}	—	February 27, 2006	Mount Lemmon	Mount Lemmon Survey	·	2.7 km	MPC · JPL
245753	2006 DZ_{184}	—	February 27, 2006	Mount Lemmon	Mount Lemmon Survey	·	1.6 km	MPC · JPL
245754	2006 DC_{187}	—	February 27, 2006	Kitt Peak	Spacewatch	NYS	1.2 km	MPC · JPL
245755	2006 DK_{193}	—	February 27, 2006	Kitt Peak	Spacewatch	·	3.9 km	MPC · JPL
245756	2006 DM_{207}	—	February 25, 2006	Kitt Peak	Spacewatch	·	1.5 km	MPC · JPL
245757	2006 EF_{5}	—	March 2, 2006	Kitt Peak	Spacewatch	MAS	720 m	MPC · JPL
245758	2006 EJ_{7}	—	March 2, 2006	Kitt Peak	Spacewatch	NYS	1.3 km	MPC · JPL
245759	2006 EK_{11}	—	March 2, 2006	Kitt Peak	Spacewatch	·	1.5 km	MPC · JPL
245760	2006 ER_{14}	—	March 2, 2006	Kitt Peak	Spacewatch	NYS	1.1 km	MPC · JPL
245761	2006 EO_{16}	—	March 2, 2006	Kitt Peak	Spacewatch	·	1.6 km	MPC · JPL
245762	2006 EO_{65}	—	March 5, 2006	Kitt Peak	Spacewatch	·	1.1 km	MPC · JPL
245763	2006 EL_{66}	—	March 5, 2006	Kitt Peak	Spacewatch	·	1.5 km	MPC · JPL
245764	2006 FU_{6}	—	March 23, 2006	Mount Lemmon	Mount Lemmon Survey	·	1.8 km	MPC · JPL
245765	2006 FZ_{7}	—	March 23, 2006	Kitt Peak	Spacewatch	·	4.1 km	MPC · JPL
245766	2006 FW_{13}	—	March 23, 2006	Kitt Peak	Spacewatch	·	1.4 km	MPC · JPL
245767	2006 FF_{21}	—	March 24, 2006	Kitt Peak	Spacewatch	·	2.0 km	MPC · JPL
245768	2006 FW_{22}	—	March 24, 2006	Kitt Peak	Spacewatch	·	1.5 km	MPC · JPL
245769	2006 FR_{26}	—	March 24, 2006	Mount Lemmon	Mount Lemmon Survey	·	1.4 km	MPC · JPL
245770	2006 FK_{38}	—	March 23, 2006	Kitt Peak	Spacewatch	·	1.7 km	MPC · JPL
245771	2006 FO_{38}	—	March 23, 2006	Kitt Peak	Spacewatch	·	1.8 km	MPC · JPL
245772	2006 FM_{50}	—	March 25, 2006	Catalina	CSS	·	5.5 km	MPC · JPL
245773	2006 GY_{8}	—	April 2, 2006	Kitt Peak	Spacewatch	NYS	1.3 km	MPC · JPL
245774	2006 GT_{13}	—	April 2, 2006	Kitt Peak	Spacewatch	·	2.6 km	MPC · JPL
245775	2006 GS_{21}	—	April 2, 2006	Mount Lemmon	Mount Lemmon Survey	V	930 m	MPC · JPL
245776	2006 GX_{23}	—	April 2, 2006	Kitt Peak	Spacewatch	·	3.6 km	MPC · JPL
245777	2006 GD_{27}	—	April 2, 2006	Kitt Peak	Spacewatch	·	2.4 km	MPC · JPL
245778	2006 GY_{30}	—	April 2, 2006	Kitt Peak	Spacewatch	·	1.8 km	MPC · JPL
245779	2006 GF_{35}	—	April 7, 2006	Socorro	LINEAR	·	2.8 km	MPC · JPL
245780	2006 GU_{41}	—	April 7, 2006	Anderson Mesa	LONEOS	·	1.5 km	MPC · JPL
245781	2006 GX_{42}	—	April 9, 2006	Siding Spring	SSS	·	4.7 km	MPC · JPL
245782	2006 GJ_{45}	—	April 7, 2006	Mount Lemmon	Mount Lemmon Survey	NYS	1.5 km	MPC · JPL
245783	2006 HP_{1}	—	April 18, 2006	Kitt Peak	Spacewatch	·	2.0 km	MPC · JPL
245784	2006 HL_{3}	—	April 18, 2006	Kitt Peak	Spacewatch	·	1.6 km	MPC · JPL
245785	2006 HS_{6}	—	April 18, 2006	Anderson Mesa	LONEOS	·	1.4 km	MPC · JPL
245786	2006 HQ_{13}	—	April 19, 2006	Palomar	NEAT	·	940 m	MPC · JPL
245787	2006 HT_{15}	—	April 20, 2006	Kitt Peak	Spacewatch	NYS	1.1 km	MPC · JPL
245788	2006 HD_{18}	—	April 19, 2006	Anderson Mesa	LONEOS	·	2.7 km	MPC · JPL
245789	2006 HK_{21}	—	April 20, 2006	Kitt Peak	Spacewatch	NYS	1.3 km	MPC · JPL
245790	2006 HX_{31}	—	April 19, 2006	Kitt Peak	Spacewatch	·	3.9 km	MPC · JPL
245791	2006 HY_{35}	—	April 20, 2006	Kitt Peak	Spacewatch	NYS	1.1 km	MPC · JPL
245792	2006 HS_{37}	—	April 21, 2006	Kitt Peak	Spacewatch	MAR	1.0 km	MPC · JPL
245793	2006 HQ_{38}	—	April 21, 2006	Kitt Peak	Spacewatch	·	2.0 km	MPC · JPL
245794	2006 HJ_{39}	—	April 21, 2006	Kitt Peak	Spacewatch	·	3.5 km	MPC · JPL
245795	2006 HA_{50}	—	April 26, 2006	Kitt Peak	Spacewatch	·	750 m	MPC · JPL
245796	2006 HM_{53}	—	April 19, 2006	Catalina	CSS	·	2.1 km	MPC · JPL
245797	2006 HX_{59}	—	April 24, 2006	Anderson Mesa	LONEOS	·	4.7 km	MPC · JPL
245798	2006 HJ_{66}	—	April 24, 2006	Kitt Peak	Spacewatch	MAS	750 m	MPC · JPL
245799	2006 HB_{67}	—	April 24, 2006	Kitt Peak	Spacewatch	·	1.5 km	MPC · JPL
245800	2006 HF_{80}	—	April 26, 2006	Kitt Peak	Spacewatch	·	1.3 km	MPC · JPL

== 245801–245900 ==
back to top

Designation			Discovery			Properties		Ref
Permanent	Provisional	Named after	Date	Site	Discoverer(s)	Category	Diam.	Ref
245801	2006 HL_{82}	—	April 26, 2006	Kitt Peak	Spacewatch	HNS	2.0 km	MPC · JPL
245802	2006 HY_{85}	—	April 27, 2006	Kitt Peak	Spacewatch	·	1.8 km	MPC · JPL
245803	2006 HT_{87}	—	April 30, 2006	Kitt Peak	Spacewatch	·	920 m	MPC · JPL
245804	2006 HH_{90}	—	April 29, 2006	Siding Spring	SSS	·	5.6 km	MPC · JPL
245805	2006 HC_{101}	—	April 30, 2006	Kitt Peak	Spacewatch	NYS	980 m	MPC · JPL
245806	2006 HR_{102}	—	April 30, 2006	Kitt Peak	Spacewatch	·	1.7 km	MPC · JPL
245807	2006 HZ_{102}	—	April 30, 2006	Kitt Peak	Spacewatch	EUN	1.1 km	MPC · JPL
245808	2006 HY_{111}	—	April 29, 2006	Siding Spring	SSS	ADE	3.9 km	MPC · JPL
245809	2006 HL_{121}	—	April 30, 2006	Kitt Peak	Spacewatch	·	2.0 km	MPC · JPL
245810	2006 HA_{125}	—	April 26, 2006	Kitt Peak	Spacewatch	·	1.6 km	MPC · JPL
245811	2006 HF_{137}	—	April 26, 2006	Cerro Tololo	M. W. Buie	·	2.8 km	MPC · JPL
245812	2006 JM	—	May 1, 2006	Reedy Creek	J. Broughton	·	2.2 km	MPC · JPL
245813	2006 JE_{2}	—	May 1, 2006	Socorro	LINEAR	NYS	1.2 km	MPC · JPL
245814	2006 JC_{10}	—	May 1, 2006	Kitt Peak	Spacewatch	EOS	3.3 km	MPC · JPL
245815	2006 JV_{17}	—	May 2, 2006	Mount Lemmon	Mount Lemmon Survey	·	2.9 km	MPC · JPL
245816	2006 JZ_{20}	—	May 2, 2006	Kitt Peak	Spacewatch	PHO	1.7 km	MPC · JPL
245817	2006 JH_{24}	—	May 4, 2006	Mount Lemmon	Mount Lemmon Survey	·	2.5 km	MPC · JPL
245818	2006 JA_{25}	—	May 5, 2006	Kitt Peak	Spacewatch	·	1.5 km	MPC · JPL
245819	2006 JL_{30}	—	May 3, 2006	Kitt Peak	Spacewatch	·	1.4 km	MPC · JPL
245820	2006 JC_{33}	—	May 3, 2006	Kitt Peak	Spacewatch	·	1.6 km	MPC · JPL
245821	2006 JE_{33}	—	May 3, 2006	Kitt Peak	Spacewatch	·	3.7 km	MPC · JPL
245822	2006 JH_{33}	—	May 3, 2006	Kitt Peak	Spacewatch	·	4.1 km	MPC · JPL
245823	2006 JG_{36}	—	May 4, 2006	Kitt Peak	Spacewatch	·	1.3 km	MPC · JPL
245824	2006 JX_{41}	—	May 7, 2006	Kitt Peak	Spacewatch	EUP	5.5 km	MPC · JPL
245825	2006 JM_{45}	—	May 8, 2006	Mount Lemmon	Mount Lemmon Survey	·	1.5 km	MPC · JPL
245826	2006 JS_{45}	—	May 8, 2006	Mount Lemmon	Mount Lemmon Survey	·	3.0 km	MPC · JPL
245827	2006 JB_{46}	—	May 9, 2006	Mount Lemmon	Mount Lemmon Survey	EOS	3.0 km	MPC · JPL
245828	2006 JX_{46}	—	May 2, 2006	Catalina	CSS	·	3.6 km	MPC · JPL
245829	2006 JK_{47}	—	May 1, 2006	Socorro	LINEAR	·	2.7 km	MPC · JPL
245830	2006 JE_{51}	—	May 2, 2006	Mount Lemmon	Mount Lemmon Survey	·	1.7 km	MPC · JPL
245831	2006 JG_{58}	—	May 14, 2006	Palomar	NEAT	JUN	1.5 km	MPC · JPL
245832	2006 KQ_{2}	—	May 18, 2006	Catalina	CSS	MAR	2.0 km	MPC · JPL
245833	2006 KA_{3}	—	May 18, 2006	Palomar	NEAT	·	1.5 km	MPC · JPL
245834	2006 KD_{13}	—	May 20, 2006	Kitt Peak	Spacewatch	ADE	3.6 km	MPC · JPL
245835	2006 KP_{15}	—	May 20, 2006	Kitt Peak	Spacewatch	·	2.8 km	MPC · JPL
245836	2006 KL_{22}	—	May 20, 2006	Catalina	CSS	·	2.1 km	MPC · JPL
245837	2006 KT_{23}	—	May 18, 2006	Palomar	NEAT	NYS	1.4 km	MPC · JPL
245838	2006 KB_{25}	—	May 19, 2006	Mount Lemmon	Mount Lemmon Survey	·	1.8 km	MPC · JPL
245839	2006 KS_{29}	—	May 20, 2006	Kitt Peak	Spacewatch	·	2.1 km	MPC · JPL
245840	2006 KX_{31}	—	May 20, 2006	Kitt Peak	Spacewatch	NYS	1.4 km	MPC · JPL
245841	2006 KX_{45}	—	May 21, 2006	Mount Lemmon	Mount Lemmon Survey	·	2.0 km	MPC · JPL
245842	2006 KB_{46}	—	May 21, 2006	Mount Lemmon	Mount Lemmon Survey	(5)	2.4 km	MPC · JPL
245843	2006 KR_{60}	—	May 22, 2006	Kitt Peak	Spacewatch	·	2.5 km	MPC · JPL
245844	2006 KX_{63}	—	May 23, 2006	Mount Lemmon	Mount Lemmon Survey	·	4.4 km	MPC · JPL
245845	2006 KF_{64}	—	May 23, 2006	Kitt Peak	Spacewatch	·	1.9 km	MPC · JPL
245846	2006 KS_{76}	—	May 24, 2006	Palomar	NEAT	·	1.7 km	MPC · JPL
245847	2006 KE_{83}	—	May 20, 2006	Kitt Peak	Spacewatch	·	2.7 km	MPC · JPL
245848	2006 KR_{101}	—	May 26, 2006	Kitt Peak	Spacewatch	·	5.7 km	MPC · JPL
245849	2006 KJ_{108}	—	May 31, 2006	Mount Lemmon	Mount Lemmon Survey	·	2.1 km	MPC · JPL
245850	2006 KG_{112}	—	May 31, 2006	Mount Lemmon	Mount Lemmon Survey	·	1.5 km	MPC · JPL
245851	2006 KH_{118}	—	May 25, 2006	Palomar	NEAT	BAR	2.1 km	MPC · JPL
245852	2006 KV_{123}	—	May 28, 2006	Socorro	LINEAR	ADE	3.1 km	MPC · JPL
245853	2006 LB_{2}	—	June 9, 2006	Palomar	NEAT	·	3.0 km	MPC · JPL
245854	2006 MM_{8}	—	June 19, 2006	Mount Lemmon	Mount Lemmon Survey	·	1.7 km	MPC · JPL
245855	2006 MG_{11}	—	June 20, 2006	Palomar	NEAT	JUN	1.4 km	MPC · JPL
245856	2006 MX_{12}	—	June 20, 2006	Catalina	CSS	·	1.8 km	MPC · JPL
245857	2006 MA_{13}	—	June 23, 2006	Lulin	Q. Ye	MAR	1.9 km	MPC · JPL
245858	2006 OG_{9}	—	July 21, 2006	Catalina	CSS	·	1.2 km	MPC · JPL
245859	2006 OD_{10}	—	July 21, 2006	Socorro	LINEAR	BAR	3.0 km	MPC · JPL
245860	2006 OB_{14}	—	July 21, 2006	Catalina	CSS	EUN	1.7 km	MPC · JPL
245861	2006 OD_{15}	—	July 29, 2006	Reedy Creek	J. Broughton	·	4.2 km	MPC · JPL
245862	2006 OM_{17}	—	July 26, 2006	Siding Spring	SSS	TIN	3.6 km	MPC · JPL
245863	2006 PJ_{8}	—	August 13, 2006	Palomar	NEAT	·	2.6 km	MPC · JPL
245864	2006 PQ_{15}	—	August 15, 2006	Palomar	NEAT	(5)	1.2 km	MPC · JPL
245865	2006 PR_{15}	—	August 15, 2006	Palomar	NEAT	·	3.5 km	MPC · JPL
245866	2006 PT_{17}	—	August 15, 2006	Palomar	NEAT	·	1.9 km	MPC · JPL
245867	2006 PF_{20}	—	August 14, 2006	Siding Spring	SSS	LIX	4.8 km	MPC · JPL
245868	2006 PJ_{21}	—	August 15, 2006	Palomar	NEAT	·	5.9 km	MPC · JPL
245869	2006 PD_{22}	—	August 15, 2006	Palomar	NEAT	·	3.7 km	MPC · JPL
245870	2006 PQ_{28}	—	August 14, 2006	Siding Spring	SSS	·	5.7 km	MPC · JPL
245871	2006 PW_{31}	—	August 14, 2006	Siding Spring	SSS	·	2.7 km	MPC · JPL
245872	2006 PD_{32}	—	August 15, 2006	Palomar	NEAT	·	4.5 km	MPC · JPL
245873	2006 PW_{32}	—	August 15, 2006	Siding Spring	SSS	EUN	1.8 km	MPC · JPL
245874	2006 PP_{34}	—	August 10, 2006	Palomar	NEAT	PHO	1.5 km	MPC · JPL
245875	2006 PY_{34}	—	August 12, 2006	Palomar	NEAT	·	4.5 km	MPC · JPL
245876	2006 PG_{43}	—	August 14, 2006	Siding Spring	SSS	·	5.2 km	MPC · JPL
245877 Kvassay	2006 QU	Kvassay	August 17, 2006	Piszkés-tető	K. Sárneczky	·	6.5 km	MPC · JPL
245878	2006 QU_{8}	—	August 19, 2006	Kitt Peak	Spacewatch	·	2.3 km	MPC · JPL
245879	2006 QL_{17}	—	August 17, 2006	Palomar	NEAT	·	3.4 km	MPC · JPL
245880	2006 QM_{19}	—	August 17, 2006	Palomar	NEAT	SYL · CYB	6.6 km	MPC · JPL
245881	2006 QU_{32}	—	August 22, 2006	Palomar	NEAT	·	2.4 km	MPC · JPL
245882	2006 QJ_{36}	—	August 23, 2006	Pla D'Arguines	R. Ferrando	·	5.1 km	MPC · JPL
245883	2006 QK_{38}	—	August 18, 2006	Socorro	LINEAR	·	4.0 km	MPC · JPL
245884	2006 QC_{45}	—	August 19, 2006	Palomar	NEAT	·	3.0 km	MPC · JPL
245885	2006 QO_{50}	—	August 22, 2006	Palomar	NEAT	·	2.6 km	MPC · JPL
245886	2006 QF_{52}	—	August 23, 2006	Palomar	NEAT	·	3.1 km	MPC · JPL
245887	2006 QY_{53}	—	August 16, 2006	Siding Spring	SSS	·	2.8 km	MPC · JPL
245888	2006 QO_{56}	—	August 20, 2006	Kitt Peak	Spacewatch	·	2.2 km	MPC · JPL
245889	2006 QH_{57}	—	August 25, 2006	Pla D'Arguines	R. Ferrando	·	4.3 km	MPC · JPL
245890 Krynychenka	2006 QE_{58}	Krynychenka	August 25, 2006	Andrushivka	Andrushivka	·	8.0 km	MPC · JPL
245891	2006 QA_{60}	—	August 19, 2006	Palomar	NEAT	·	6.0 km	MPC · JPL
245892	2006 QO_{63}	—	August 24, 2006	Socorro	LINEAR	·	5.8 km	MPC · JPL
245893	2006 QA_{76}	—	August 21, 2006	Kitt Peak	Spacewatch	VER	3.1 km	MPC · JPL
245894	2006 QH_{77}	—	August 22, 2006	Palomar	NEAT	·	4.0 km	MPC · JPL
245895	2006 QJ_{77}	—	August 22, 2006	Palomar	NEAT	HOF	3.7 km	MPC · JPL
245896	2006 QV_{78}	—	August 23, 2006	Socorro	LINEAR	·	3.4 km	MPC · JPL
245897	2006 QM_{80}	—	August 24, 2006	Palomar	NEAT	·	2.2 km	MPC · JPL
245898	2006 QB_{83}	—	August 27, 2006	Kitt Peak	Spacewatch	·	3.7 km	MPC · JPL
245899	2006 QN_{84}	—	August 27, 2006	Kitt Peak	Spacewatch	·	4.8 km	MPC · JPL
245900	2006 QX_{91}	—	August 16, 2006	Palomar	NEAT	·	4.1 km	MPC · JPL

== 245901–246000 ==
back to top

Designation			Discovery			Properties		Ref
Permanent	Provisional	Named after	Date	Site	Discoverer(s)	Category	Diam.	Ref
245901	2006 QH_{98}	—	August 22, 2006	Palomar	NEAT	·	3.1 km	MPC · JPL
245902	2006 QS_{98}	—	August 22, 2006	Palomar	NEAT	·	2.5 km	MPC · JPL
245903	2006 QH_{106}	—	August 28, 2006	Catalina	CSS	·	2.8 km	MPC · JPL
245904	2006 QO_{110}	—	August 28, 2006	Anderson Mesa	LONEOS	·	3.4 km	MPC · JPL
245905	2006 QQ_{110}	—	August 28, 2006	Anderson Mesa	LONEOS	·	2.4 km	MPC · JPL
245906	2006 QT_{113}	—	August 24, 2006	Palomar	NEAT	·	2.8 km	MPC · JPL
245907	2006 QY_{114}	—	August 27, 2006	Anderson Mesa	LONEOS	·	5.6 km	MPC · JPL
245908	2006 QD_{115}	—	August 27, 2006	Anderson Mesa	LONEOS	·	3.3 km	MPC · JPL
245909	2006 QL_{131}	—	August 22, 2006	Palomar	NEAT	·	3.8 km	MPC · JPL
245910	2006 QV_{135}	—	August 28, 2006	Catalina	CSS	·	2.6 km	MPC · JPL
245911	2006 QJ_{138}	—	August 16, 2006	Palomar	NEAT	·	5.6 km	MPC · JPL
245912	2006 QL_{141}	—	August 18, 2006	Palomar	NEAT	·	1.8 km	MPC · JPL
245913	2006 QR_{146}	—	August 18, 2006	Kitt Peak	Spacewatch	MIS	2.3 km	MPC · JPL
245914	2006 QY_{161}	—	August 20, 2006	Kitt Peak	Spacewatch	·	2.3 km	MPC · JPL
245915	2006 QB_{162}	—	August 20, 2006	Kitt Peak	Spacewatch	KOR	2.2 km	MPC · JPL
245916	2006 QQ_{165}	—	August 29, 2006	Catalina	CSS	NEM	3.2 km	MPC · JPL
245917	2006 QS_{171}	—	August 22, 2006	Cerro Tololo	M. W. Buie	(1298)	3.8 km	MPC · JPL
245918	2006 QF_{185}	—	August 28, 2006	Kitt Peak	Spacewatch	·	4.1 km	MPC · JPL
245919	2006 RX_{2}	—	September 12, 2006	Catalina	CSS	·	2.1 km	MPC · JPL
245920	2006 RG_{4}	—	September 12, 2006	Catalina	CSS	EOS	2.9 km	MPC · JPL
245921	2006 RT_{8}	—	September 12, 2006	Catalina	CSS	·	5.2 km	MPC · JPL
245922	2006 RY_{11}	—	September 13, 2006	Palomar	NEAT	THM	2.8 km	MPC · JPL
245923	2006 RU_{12}	—	September 14, 2006	Kitt Peak	Spacewatch	·	2.2 km	MPC · JPL
245924	2006 RJ_{13}	—	September 14, 2006	Kitt Peak	Spacewatch	LIX	6.0 km	MPC · JPL
245925	2006 RT_{15}	—	September 14, 2006	Catalina	CSS	·	6.8 km	MPC · JPL
245926	2006 RU_{18}	—	September 14, 2006	Palomar	NEAT	·	4.8 km	MPC · JPL
245927	2006 RG_{19}	—	September 14, 2006	Kitt Peak	Spacewatch	·	3.7 km	MPC · JPL
245928	2006 RG_{20}	—	September 15, 2006	Socorro	LINEAR	·	3.9 km	MPC · JPL
245929	2006 RV_{21}	—	September 15, 2006	Catalina	CSS	·	5.5 km	MPC · JPL
245930	2006 RZ_{21}	—	September 15, 2006	Catalina	CSS	·	6.9 km	MPC · JPL
245931	2006 RW_{30}	—	September 15, 2006	Socorro	LINEAR	VER	6.0 km	MPC · JPL
245932	2006 RP_{34}	—	September 13, 2006	Palomar	NEAT	·	5.0 km	MPC · JPL
245933	2006 RF_{47}	—	September 14, 2006	Kitt Peak	Spacewatch	THM	3.7 km	MPC · JPL
245934	2006 RT_{51}	—	September 14, 2006	Kitt Peak	Spacewatch	AST	2.1 km	MPC · JPL
245935	2006 RY_{53}	—	September 14, 2006	Kitt Peak	Spacewatch	·	3.0 km	MPC · JPL
245936	2006 RG_{64}	—	September 12, 2006	Catalina	CSS	·	5.0 km	MPC · JPL
245937	2006 RS_{65}	—	September 14, 2006	Palomar	NEAT	·	4.2 km	MPC · JPL
245938	2006 RB_{73}	—	September 15, 2006	Kitt Peak	Spacewatch	·	2.2 km	MPC · JPL
245939	2006 RR_{78}	—	September 15, 2006	Kitt Peak	Spacewatch	·	4.0 km	MPC · JPL
245940	2006 RM_{79}	—	September 15, 2006	Kitt Peak	Spacewatch	·	2.7 km	MPC · JPL
245941	2006 RL_{83}	—	September 15, 2006	Kitt Peak	Spacewatch	·	2.2 km	MPC · JPL
245942	2006 RS_{104}	—	September 15, 2006	Apache Point	A. C. Becker	·	4.2 km	MPC · JPL
245943 Davidjoseph	2006 RZ_{114}	Davidjoseph	September 14, 2006	Mauna Kea	Masiero, J.	·	4.0 km	MPC · JPL
245944	2006 SH_{2}	—	September 16, 2006	Catalina	CSS	EUN	2.5 km	MPC · JPL
245945	2006 SX_{12}	—	September 17, 2006	Kitt Peak	Spacewatch	·	2.9 km	MPC · JPL
245946	2006 SF_{16}	—	September 17, 2006	Catalina	CSS	EMA	6.1 km	MPC · JPL
245947	2006 SK_{16}	—	September 17, 2006	Kitt Peak	Spacewatch	VER	5.7 km	MPC · JPL
245948	2006 SJ_{19}	—	September 18, 2006	Catalina	CSS	EUP	7.3 km	MPC · JPL
245949	2006 SG_{21}	—	September 16, 2006	Anderson Mesa	LONEOS	WIT	1.3 km	MPC · JPL
245950	2006 SD_{26}	—	September 16, 2006	Catalina	CSS	·	3.5 km	MPC · JPL
245951	2006 SO_{26}	—	September 16, 2006	Anderson Mesa	LONEOS	·	3.1 km	MPC · JPL
245952	2006 SO_{27}	—	September 16, 2006	Catalina	CSS	·	2.9 km	MPC · JPL
245953	2006 SS_{36}	—	September 17, 2006	Catalina	CSS	·	3.9 km	MPC · JPL
245954	2006 SR_{42}	—	September 18, 2006	Catalina	CSS	·	4.6 km	MPC · JPL
245955	2006 SA_{46}	—	September 18, 2006	Socorro	LINEAR	·	2.7 km	MPC · JPL
245956	2006 SW_{46}	—	September 19, 2006	Catalina	CSS	·	5.5 km	MPC · JPL
245957	2006 SX_{48}	—	September 18, 2006	Anderson Mesa	LONEOS	·	2.0 km	MPC · JPL
245958	2006 SR_{51}	—	September 17, 2006	Anderson Mesa	LONEOS	ADE	2.7 km	MPC · JPL
245959	2006 SY_{55}	—	September 18, 2006	Socorro	LINEAR	JUN	1.7 km	MPC · JPL
245960	2006 SF_{57}	—	September 16, 2006	Catalina	CSS	·	5.1 km	MPC · JPL
245961	2006 SD_{58}	—	September 18, 2006	Catalina	CSS	·	4.5 km	MPC · JPL
245962	2006 SE_{59}	—	September 16, 2006	Catalina	CSS	·	6.0 km	MPC · JPL
245963	2006 SH_{65}	—	September 16, 2006	Anderson Mesa	LONEOS	·	2.5 km	MPC · JPL
245964	2006 SC_{75}	—	September 19, 2006	Kitt Peak	Spacewatch	·	2.6 km	MPC · JPL
245965	2006 SU_{79}	—	September 17, 2006	Catalina	CSS	·	4.8 km	MPC · JPL
245966	2006 SL_{84}	—	September 18, 2006	Kitt Peak	Spacewatch	·	3.3 km	MPC · JPL
245967	2006 SC_{88}	—	September 18, 2006	Kitt Peak	Spacewatch	·	3.7 km	MPC · JPL
245968	2006 SE_{90}	—	September 18, 2006	Kitt Peak	Spacewatch	·	3.1 km	MPC · JPL
245969	2006 SL_{95}	—	September 18, 2006	Kitt Peak	Spacewatch	THM	4.4 km	MPC · JPL
245970	2006 SZ_{98}	—	September 18, 2006	Kitt Peak	Spacewatch	·	3.2 km	MPC · JPL
245971	2006 SX_{107}	—	September 19, 2006	Catalina	CSS	·	4.9 km	MPC · JPL
245972	2006 SR_{111}	—	September 22, 2006	Catalina	CSS	·	7.4 km	MPC · JPL
245973	2006 ST_{112}	—	September 23, 2006	Kitt Peak	Spacewatch	·	2.1 km	MPC · JPL
245974	2006 SU_{115}	—	September 24, 2006	Anderson Mesa	LONEOS	·	3.0 km	MPC · JPL
245975	2006 SL_{124}	—	September 19, 2006	Catalina	CSS	·	3.1 km	MPC · JPL
245976	2006 SH_{126}	—	September 21, 2006	Anderson Mesa	LONEOS	·	3.2 km	MPC · JPL
245977	2006 SV_{128}	—	September 17, 2006	Catalina	CSS	·	3.6 km	MPC · JPL
245978	2006 SY_{131}	—	September 16, 2006	Catalina	CSS	ADE	2.2 km	MPC · JPL
245979	2006 SX_{134}	—	September 20, 2006	Anderson Mesa	LONEOS	·	4.4 km	MPC · JPL
245980	2006 SD_{154}	—	September 20, 2006	Anderson Mesa	LONEOS	(5)	1.7 km	MPC · JPL
245981	2006 SN_{155}	—	September 22, 2006	Catalina	CSS	PHO	1.6 km	MPC · JPL
245982	2006 SW_{166}	—	September 25, 2006	Kitt Peak	Spacewatch	·	2.5 km	MPC · JPL
245983 Machholz	2006 SG_{198}	Machholz	September 26, 2006	Moletai	K. Černis	·	5.0 km	MPC · JPL
245984	2006 SX_{209}	—	September 26, 2006	Mount Lemmon	Mount Lemmon Survey	·	2.9 km	MPC · JPL
245985	2006 SA_{213}	—	September 26, 2006	Catalina	CSS	·	2.1 km	MPC · JPL
245986	2006 SU_{214}	—	September 27, 2006	Socorro	LINEAR	·	3.8 km	MPC · JPL
245987	2006 SY_{223}	—	September 25, 2006	Mount Lemmon	Mount Lemmon Survey	·	4.0 km	MPC · JPL
245988	2006 SM_{228}	—	September 26, 2006	Kitt Peak	Spacewatch	·	4.7 km	MPC · JPL
245989	2006 SG_{255}	—	September 26, 2006	Catalina	CSS	·	5.5 km	MPC · JPL
245990	2006 SF_{270}	—	September 27, 2006	Kitt Peak	Spacewatch	EOS	2.4 km	MPC · JPL
245991	2006 SK_{274}	—	September 27, 2006	Kitt Peak	Spacewatch	·	5.1 km	MPC · JPL
245992	2006 SL_{278}	—	September 28, 2006	Catalina	CSS	·	3.8 km	MPC · JPL
245993	2006 SZ_{279}	—	September 28, 2006	Catalina	CSS	slow	1.7 km	MPC · JPL
245994	2006 SS_{281}	—	September 18, 2006	Catalina	CSS	·	5.4 km	MPC · JPL
245995	2006 SN_{301}	—	September 26, 2006	Catalina	CSS	·	2.0 km	MPC · JPL
245996	2006 SH_{303}	—	September 27, 2006	Kitt Peak	Spacewatch	·	3.3 km	MPC · JPL
245997	2006 SX_{306}	—	September 27, 2006	Kitt Peak	Spacewatch	·	2.3 km	MPC · JPL
245998	2006 SL_{308}	—	September 27, 2006	Kitt Peak	Spacewatch	·	2.2 km	MPC · JPL
245999	2006 SA_{319}	—	September 27, 2006	Kitt Peak	Spacewatch	EOS	2.4 km	MPC · JPL
246000	2006 SC_{334}	—	September 28, 2006	Kitt Peak	Spacewatch	KOR	2.0 km	MPC · JPL

back to top

== See also ==
- Meanings of minor-planet names: 245001–246000
