= Meanings of minor-planet names: 245001–246000 =

As minor planet discoveries are confirmed, they are given a permanent number by the IAU's Minor Planet Center (MPC), and the discoverers can then submit names for them, following the IAU's naming conventions. The list below concerns those minor planets in the specified number-range that have received names, and explains the meanings of those names.

Official naming citations of newly named small Solar System bodies are approved and published in a bulletin by IAU's Working Group for Small Bodies Nomenclature (WGSBN). Before May 2021, citations were published in MPC's Minor Planet Circulars for many decades. Recent citations can also be found on the JPL Small-Body Database (SBDB). Until his death in 2016, German astronomer Lutz D. Schmadel compiled these citations into the Dictionary of Minor Planet Names (DMP) and regularly updated the collection.

Based on Paul Herget's The Names of the Minor Planets, Schmadel also researched the unclear origin of numerous asteroids, most of which had been named prior to World War II. This article incorporates text from this source, which is in the public domain: SBDB New namings may only be added to this list below after official publication as the preannouncement of names is condemned. The WGSBN publishes a comprehensive guideline for the naming rules of non-cometary small Solar System bodies.

== 245001–245100 ==
Named minor planet	Provisional	This minor planet was named for...	Ref · Catalog
There are no named minor planets in this number range

== 245101–245200 ==
back to top

Named minor planet	Provisional	This minor planet was named for...	Ref · Catalog
245158 Thomasandrews	2004 TU_{18}	Thomas Andrews (1873–1912), the British shipbuilder who was primarily responsible for the design of the RMS Titanic	JPL · 245158

== 245201–245300 ==
back to top

Named minor planet	Provisional	This minor planet was named for...	Ref · Catalog
There are no named minor planets in this number range

== 245301–245400 ==
back to top

Named minor planet	Provisional	This minor planet was named for...	Ref · Catalog
There are no named minor planets in this number range

== 245401–245500 ==
back to top

Named minor planet	Provisional	This minor planet was named for...	Ref · Catalog
245417 Rostand	2005 JA_{46}	Edmond Rostand (1868–1918), a French poet and playwright.	JPL · 245417

== 245501–245600 ==
back to top

Named minor planet	Provisional	This minor planet was named for...	Ref · Catalog
There are no named minor planets in this number range

== 245601–245700 ==
back to top

Named minor planet	Provisional	This minor planet was named for...	Ref · Catalog
There are no named minor planets in this number range

== 245701–245800 ==
back to top

Named minor planet	Provisional	This minor planet was named for...	Ref · Catalog
There are no named minor planets in this number range

== 245801–245900 ==
back to top

Named minor planet	Provisional	This minor planet was named for...	Ref · Catalog
245877 Kvassay	2006 QU	Jenő Kvassay, civil engineer who established the modern Hungarian water management service.	IAU · 245877
245890 Krynychenka	2006 QE_{58}	Galyna Ivanivna Biletska (born 1961), the leader of the "Krynychenka" folk song and dance ensemble from Andrushivka	JPL · 245890

== 245901–246000 ==
back to top

Named minor planet	Provisional	This minor planet was named for...	Ref · Catalog
245943 Davidjoseph	2006 RZ_{114}	David Joseph Masiero (1953–2013), an American mechanical engineer, specializing in nuclear power plant design. He is the father of the discoverer Joseph Masiero.	JPL · 245943
245983 Machholz	2006 SG_{198}	Donald Machholz (1952–2022) is an American amateur astronomer. He discovered visually 11 new comets in 1978–2010 (including periodic comets 96P and 141P). He is one of the inventors of the Messier marathon, a race to observe all the Messier objects in a single night.	JPL · 245983

back to top

Preceded by 244,001–245,000	Meanings of minor-planet names List of minor planets: 245,001–246,000	Succeeded by 246,001–247,000
