= Comet Wolf =

Comet Wolf may be:

- 14P/Wolf (a.k.a. 14P/1884 S1, 1884 III, 1884c, 14P/1891 J1, 1891 II, 1891b, 1898 IV, 1898f, 1912 I, 1911a, 1918 V, 1918b, 1925 X, 1925e, 1934 I, 1933e, 1942 VI, 1950 VI, 1950c, 1959 II, 1958c, 1967 XII, 1967j, 1976 II, 1975f, 1984 IX, 1983m, 1992 XXII, 1992m)
- C/1916 G1 (a.k.a. 1917 III, 1916b)
- A partial reference to 43P/Wolf-Harrington (a.k.a. 43P/1924 Y1, 1924 IV, 1924d, 43P/1951 T2, 1952 II, 1951k, 1958 V, 1957g, 1965 III, 1964g, 1971 VI, 1970o, 1978 VI, 1977j, 1984 XVII, 1984g, 1991 V, 1990e)
