= 14P/Wolf =

Jupiter-family comet

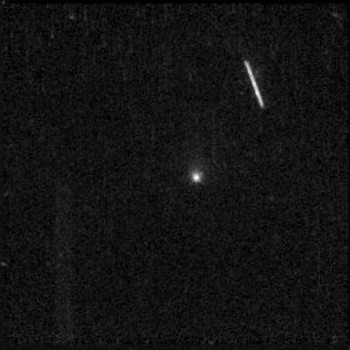
- 14P/Wolf imaged by the Hubble Space Telescope on 17 September 2000

Discovery
- Discovered by: Max Wolf
- Discovery site: Heidelberg, Germany
- Discovery date: 17 September 1884

Designations
- MPC designation: P/1884 S1, P/1891 J1
- Alternative designations: 1884 III, 1891 II; 1898 IV, 1912 I, 1918 V; 1925 X, 1934 I, 1942 VI; 1950 VI, 1959 II; 1967 XII, 1976 II; 1984 IX, 1992 XXII

Orbital characteristics
- Epoch: 6 June 2026 (JD 2461200.5)
- Observation arc: 141.90 years (Note: Observation arc from the Minor Planet Center database only covered dates from 20 September 1884 until 12 August 2026 (141.89 years). This figure included its entire arc up to 17 September 1884.)
- Number of observations: 780
- Aphelion: 5.772 AU
- Perihelion: 2.738 AU
- Semi-major axis: 4.255 AU
- Eccentricity: 0.35644
- Orbital period: 8.778 years
- Inclination: 27.919°
- Longitude of ascending node: 202.01°
- Argument of periapsis: 159.21°
- Mean anomaly: 348.54°
- Last perihelion: 19 September 2026
- Next perihelion: 19 June 2035
- T_{Jupiter}: 2.716
- Earth MOID: 1.76 AU (263 million km)
- Jupiter MOID: 0.05 AU (7.5 million km)

Physical characteristics
- Mean radius: 3.16±0.01 km
- Mean density: 0.32±0.02 g/cm^{3}
- Synodic rotation period: 9.02±0.01 hours
- Spectral type: (V–R) = 0.57±0.07; (R–I) = 0.51±0.06
- Comet total magnitude (M1): 15.6

14P/Wolf is a Jupiter-family comet roughly 6.32 km (3.93 mi) in diameter with an 8.8-year orbit around the Sun. It is the first of three comets discovered by German astronomer, Max Wolf. (Note: His other comet discoveries were C/1916 G1 (Wolf) and 43P/Wolf–Harrington.) The current orbit does not bring it closer than about 1.75 AU (262 million km) from Earth. It reached perihelion on 19 September 2026, its next perihelion is on 19 June 2035.

== Observational history ==
Max Wolf discovered the comet from Heidelberg, Germany on 17 September 1884, about 15 days before it passed 0.8 AU (120 million km) from Earth. It was later rediscovered by, but not credited to, Ralph Copeland (Dun Echt Observatory, Aberdeen, Scotland) on September 23.

== Orbit ==
Perihelion distance at different epochs
Epoch	Perihelion (AU)
1869	2.74
1878	1.57
1925	2.44
2009	2.72
2044	2.44
2068	2.62

Before approaching Jupiter in 1875, the comet had a perihelion of 2.74 AU (410 million km) and an orbital period of 8.84 years, and the approach dropped perihelion to 1.57 AU (235 million km). An approach to Jupiter in September 1922 lifted perihelion to 2.43 AU (364 million km). The current perihelion of 2.7 AU is from when the comet passed Jupiter on 13 August 2005. Another close approach to Jupiter on 10 March 2041 will return the comet to parameters similar to the period 1925–2000.

== Physical characteristics ==
In 2005, the comet's nucleus is estimated to have an effective radius of 3.16±0.01 kilometers. Follow-up observations in 2017 revealed that 14P/Wolf rotates around its axis once every 9.02±0.01 hours.

== Potential meteor shower ==
In 1999, Dr. Luboš Neslušan published a study where he proposed that 14P/Wolf is potentially associated with two meteor streams, one overlapping with that of 206P/Barnard–Boattini (Note: At the time, 206P was considered a lost comet (D/1892 T1) and wasn't recovered until 2008.) and the other coinciding with that of the Alpha Capricornids meteor shower. However, the comet never went closer than 1.6 AU (240 million km) from the Earth, (Note: 14P/Wolf's closest encounters with Earth (1.6 AU) occurred during its multiple approaches with Jupiter between 1875 and 1922.) and thus is unlikely to be a parent body of any known meteor stream. Later studies in 2010 and 2017 now conclude that 169P/NEAT and possibly 789058 (2017 MB_{1}) were the parent bodies of the Alpha Capricornids.

== Bibliography ==
- Kronk, Gary W.; Meyer, Maik; Seargent, David A. J. (2003). Cometography: A Catalog of Comets. Vol. 2: 1800–1899. Cambridge University Press. ISBN 978-0-521-58505-7.
- Kronk, Gary W.; Meyer, Maik; Seargent, David A. J. (2007). Cometography: A Catalog of Comets. Vol. 3: 1900–1932. Cambridge University Press. ISBN 978-0-521-58506-4.
- Kronk, Gary W.; Meyer, Maik; Seargent, David A. J. (2009). Cometography: A Catalog of Comets. Vol. 4: 1933–1959. Cambridge University Press. ISBN 978-0-521-58507-1.
- Kronk, Gary W.; Meyer, Maik; Seargent, David A. J. (2010). Cometography: A Catalog of Comets. Vol. 5: 1960–1982. Cambridge University Press. ISBN 978-0-521-87226-3.
- Kronk, Gary W.; Meyer, Maik; Seargent, David A. J. (2017). Cometography: A Catalog of Comets. Vol. 6: 1983–1993. Cambridge University Press. ISBN 978-0-521-87216-4.

Numbered comets
Previous; 13P/Olbers	14P/Wolf	Next; 15P/Finlay
