= List of minor planets: 789001–790000 =

The following is a partial list of minor planets, running from minor-planet number 789001 through 790000, inclusive. The primary data for this and other partial lists is based on JPL's "Small-Body Orbital Elements" and data available from the Minor Planet Center. Critical list information is also provided by the MPC, unless otherwise specified from Lowell Observatory. A detailed description of the table's columns and additional sources are given on the main page including a complete list of every page in this series, and a statistical break-up on the dynamical classification of minor planets.

Also see the summary list of all named bodies in numerical and alphabetical order, and the corresponding naming citations for the number range of this particular list. New namings may only be added to this list after official publication, as the preannouncement of names is condemned by the Working Group for Small Bodies Nomenclature of the International Astronomical Union.

Near-Earth obj.	MBA (inner)	MBA (outer)	Centaur
Mars-crosser	MBA (middle)	Jupiter trojan	Trans-Neptunian obj.
Unclassified

== 789001–789100 ==
Designation			Discovery			Properties		Ref
Permanent	Provisional	Named after	Date	Site	Discoverer(s)	Category	Diam.	Ref
789001	2017 HE_{95}	—	April 27, 2017	Haleakala	Pan-STARRS 1	·	1.4 km	MPC · JPL
789002	2017 HL_{95}	—	April 22, 2017	Mount Lemmon	Mount Lemmon Survey	·	1.6 km	MPC · JPL
789003	2017 HW_{95}	—	April 28, 2017	Haleakala	Pan-STARRS 1	·	1.5 km	MPC · JPL
789004	2017 HJ_{98}	—	April 27, 2017	Haleakala	Pan-STARRS 1	·	950 m	MPC · JPL
789005	2017 HA_{99}	—	April 27, 2017	Haleakala	Pan-STARRS 1	AGN	920 m	MPC · JPL
789006	2017 HL_{99}	—	April 20, 2017	Haleakala	Pan-STARRS 1	·	1.3 km	MPC · JPL
789007	2017 HJ_{100}	—	April 27, 2017	Haleakala	Pan-STARRS 1	EOS	1.3 km	MPC · JPL
789008	2017 HF_{101}	—	April 19, 2017	Mount Lemmon	Mount Lemmon Survey	THM	1.8 km	MPC · JPL
789009	2017 HN_{103}	—	April 26, 2017	Haleakala	Pan-STARRS 1	URS	1.8 km	MPC · JPL
789010	2017 HR_{103}	—	April 20, 2017	Haleakala	Pan-STARRS 1	KOR	890 m	MPC · JPL
789011	2017 HU_{103}	—	April 27, 2017	Haleakala	Pan-STARRS 1	·	1.3 km	MPC · JPL
789012	2017 HY_{103}	—	April 20, 2017	Haleakala	Pan-STARRS 1	·	1.1 km	MPC · JPL
789013	2017 HE_{104}	—	April 20, 2017	Haleakala	Pan-STARRS 1	·	1.4 km	MPC · JPL
789014	2017 HZ_{104}	—	October 23, 2014	Kitt Peak	Spacewatch	·	1.4 km	MPC · JPL
789015	2017 HO_{105}	—	November 6, 2005	Mount Lemmon	Mount Lemmon Survey	AST	1.3 km	MPC · JPL
789016	2017 HQ_{105}	—	April 20, 2017	Haleakala	Pan-STARRS 1	EOS	1.2 km	MPC · JPL
789017	2017 HX_{105}	—	September 19, 2014	Haleakala	Pan-STARRS 1	·	1.2 km	MPC · JPL
789018	2017 HK_{115}	—	August 7, 2018	Haleakala	Pan-STARRS 1	·	1.2 km	MPC · JPL
789019	2017 HQ_{115}	—	April 20, 2017	Haleakala	Pan-STARRS 1	·	1.9 km	MPC · JPL
789020	2017 JV_{4}	—	April 6, 2017	Mount Lemmon	Mount Lemmon Survey	·	1.3 km	MPC · JPL
789021	2017 JH_{7}	—	October 4, 2014	Mount Lemmon	Mount Lemmon Survey	·	1.9 km	MPC · JPL
789022	2017 JU_{7}	—	May 1, 2017	Mount Lemmon	Mount Lemmon Survey	·	1.2 km	MPC · JPL
789023	2017 JS_{8}	—	May 1, 2017	Mount Lemmon	Mount Lemmon Survey	·	2.0 km	MPC · JPL
789024	2017 JU_{8}	—	May 5, 2017	Haleakala	Pan-STARRS 1	·	1.0 km	MPC · JPL
789025	2017 JZ_{10}	—	May 15, 2017	Mount Lemmon	Mount Lemmon Survey	·	1.2 km	MPC · JPL
789026	2017 KY_{1}	—	January 2, 2016	Haleakala	Pan-STARRS 1	·	2.2 km	MPC · JPL
789027	2017 KT_{2}	—	December 4, 2015	Haleakala	Pan-STARRS 1	BAR	930 m	MPC · JPL
789028	2017 KB_{6}	—	March 25, 2012	Catalina	CSS	·	1.4 km	MPC · JPL
789029	2017 KC_{8}	—	June 7, 2013	Haleakala	Pan-STARRS 1	·	890 m	MPC · JPL
789030	2017 KR_{12}	—	March 7, 2017	Haleakala	Pan-STARRS 1	·	900 m	MPC · JPL
789031	2017 KK_{14}	—	May 1, 2017	Mount Lemmon	Mount Lemmon Survey	·	1.0 km	MPC · JPL
789032	2017 KO_{14}	—	May 1, 2017	Mount Lemmon	Mount Lemmon Survey	·	950 m	MPC · JPL
789033	2017 KD_{17}	—	February 16, 2012	Haleakala	Pan-STARRS 1	·	1.0 km	MPC · JPL
789034	2017 KV_{17}	—	May 18, 2017	Haleakala	Pan-STARRS 1	·	1.5 km	MPC · JPL
789035	2017 KX_{17}	—	May 18, 2017	Haleakala	Pan-STARRS 1	·	970 m	MPC · JPL
789036	2017 KR_{18}	—	January 2, 2016	Mount Lemmon	Mount Lemmon Survey	·	850 m	MPC · JPL
789037	2017 KA_{22}	—	February 3, 2016	Haleakala	Pan-STARRS 1	·	1.4 km	MPC · JPL
789038	2017 KU_{22}	—	April 14, 2008	Mount Lemmon	Mount Lemmon Survey	·	1.2 km	MPC · JPL
789039	2017 KV_{22}	—	December 30, 2015	Haleakala	Pan-STARRS 1	HNS	930 m	MPC · JPL
789040	2017 KW_{23}	—	June 30, 2013	Haleakala	Pan-STARRS 1	·	1.1 km	MPC · JPL
789041	2017 KW_{26}	—	May 18, 2017	Haleakala	Pan-STARRS 1	·	1.1 km	MPC · JPL
789042	2017 KQ_{28}	—	May 18, 2013	Mount Lemmon	Mount Lemmon Survey	·	1.1 km	MPC · JPL
789043	2017 KG_{29}	—	May 25, 2017	Haleakala	Pan-STARRS 1	EUN	840 m	MPC · JPL
789044	2017 KV_{30}	—	June 30, 2013	Haleakala	Pan-STARRS 1	·	1.3 km	MPC · JPL
789045	2017 KR_{32}	—	January 2, 2016	Mount Lemmon	Mount Lemmon Survey	·	1.0 km	MPC · JPL
789046	2017 KK_{35}	—	January 29, 2011	Mount Lemmon	Mount Lemmon Survey	TIN	970 m	MPC · JPL
789047	2017 KP_{38}	—	May 26, 2017	Haleakala	Pan-STARRS 1	L4	6.5 km	MPC · JPL
789048	2017 KS_{38}	—	January 3, 2012	Mount Lemmon	Mount Lemmon Survey	·	1.1 km	MPC · JPL
789049	2017 KC_{39}	—	June 21, 2012	Kitt Peak	Spacewatch	LIX	2.7 km	MPC · JPL
789050	2017 KR_{40}	—	May 27, 2017	Haleakala	Pan-STARRS 1	·	1.3 km	MPC · JPL
789051	2017 KB_{41}	—	April 28, 2008	Kitt Peak	Spacewatch	·	1.2 km	MPC · JPL
789052	2017 KC_{41}	—	May 17, 2017	Mount Lemmon	Mount Lemmon Survey	·	1.1 km	MPC · JPL
789053	2017 KS_{42}	—	May 21, 2017	Haleakala	Pan-STARRS 1	·	1.3 km	MPC · JPL
789054	2017 KW_{44}	—	May 21, 2017	Haleakala	Pan-STARRS 1	·	1.3 km	MPC · JPL
789055	2017 KO_{51}	—	February 9, 2016	Haleakala	Pan-STARRS 1	·	1.3 km	MPC · JPL
789056	2017 KT_{51}	—	May 17, 2017	Haleakala	Pan-STARRS 1	·	2.1 km	MPC · JPL
789057	2017 LN_{2}	—	June 2, 2017	Cerro Tololo	M. Micheli, F. Valdes	·	2.1 km	MPC · JPL
789058	2017 MB_{1}	—	June 19, 2017	Mount Lemmon	Mount Lemmon Survey	APO · PHA	610 m	MPC · JPL
789059	2017 MQ_{1}	—	November 4, 2005	Mount Lemmon	Mount Lemmon Survey	·	1.1 km	MPC · JPL
789060	2017 MR_{1}	—	December 31, 2007	Kitt Peak	Spacewatch	·	1.3 km	MPC · JPL
789061	2017 MU_{9}	—	March 29, 2012	Haleakala	Pan-STARRS 1	·	1.6 km	MPC · JPL
789062	2017 MJ_{10}	—	October 2, 2008	Catalina	CSS	·	1.6 km	MPC · JPL
789063	2017 MC_{14}	—	March 28, 2016	Cerro Tololo	DECam	·	2.2 km	MPC · JPL
789064	2017 MO_{14}	—	August 14, 2006	Siding Spring	SSS	·	3.0 km	MPC · JPL
789065	2017 MN_{16}	—	November 4, 2013	Kitt Peak	Spacewatch	·	1.8 km	MPC · JPL
789066	2017 MD_{17}	—	June 25, 2017	Haleakala	Pan-STARRS 1	·	1.3 km	MPC · JPL
789067	2017 ME_{17}	—	June 22, 2017	Haleakala	Pan-STARRS 1	EOS	1.3 km	MPC · JPL
789068	2017 MZ_{17}	—	June 21, 2017	Haleakala	Pan-STARRS 1	·	1.3 km	MPC · JPL
789069	2017 MR_{18}	—	June 25, 2017	Haleakala	Pan-STARRS 1	·	1.3 km	MPC · JPL
789070	2017 MD_{19}	—	June 25, 2017	Haleakala	Pan-STARRS 1	GAL	860 m	MPC · JPL
789071	2017 MJ_{19}	—	June 25, 2017	Haleakala	Pan-STARRS 1	NAE	1.5 km	MPC · JPL
789072	2017 MM_{21}	—	June 25, 2017	Haleakala	Pan-STARRS 1	·	2.3 km	MPC · JPL
789073	2017 MN_{21}	—	June 25, 2017	Haleakala	Pan-STARRS 1	RAF	570 m	MPC · JPL
789074	2017 MF_{22}	—	June 25, 2017	Haleakala	Pan-STARRS 1	·	1.4 km	MPC · JPL
789075	2017 MF_{27}	—	June 25, 2017	Haleakala	Pan-STARRS 1	·	1.8 km	MPC · JPL
789076	2017 MR_{27}	—	June 25, 2017	Haleakala	Pan-STARRS 1	·	2.1 km	MPC · JPL
789077	2017 MN_{29}	—	June 25, 2017	Haleakala	Pan-STARRS 1	·	1.9 km	MPC · JPL
789078	2017 MO_{29}	—	June 25, 2017	Haleakala	Pan-STARRS 1	·	1.3 km	MPC · JPL
789079	2017 MD_{30}	—	June 25, 2017	Haleakala	Pan-STARRS 1	·	1.4 km	MPC · JPL
789080	2017 ML_{31}	—	November 8, 2013	Catalina	CSS	WAT	1.5 km	MPC · JPL
789081	2017 MC_{32}	—	March 23, 2012	Mount Lemmon	Mount Lemmon Survey	EUN	960 m	MPC · JPL
789082	2017 MQ_{32}	—	June 23, 2017	Haleakala	Pan-STARRS 1	·	1.4 km	MPC · JPL
789083	2017 MS_{33}	—	June 24, 2017	Haleakala	Pan-STARRS 1	·	2.1 km	MPC · JPL
789084	2017 MN_{35}	—	June 22, 2017	Haleakala	Pan-STARRS 1	·	2.0 km	MPC · JPL
789085	2017 MD_{37}	—	June 25, 2017	Haleakala	Pan-STARRS 1	·	2.0 km	MPC · JPL
789086	2017 MF_{37}	—	June 22, 2017	Haleakala	Pan-STARRS 1	·	2.3 km	MPC · JPL
789087	2017 MG_{37}	—	June 22, 2017	Haleakala	Pan-STARRS 1	·	2.0 km	MPC · JPL
789088	2017 MP_{38}	—	June 25, 2017	Haleakala	Pan-STARRS 1	ARM	2.4 km	MPC · JPL
789089	2017 MX_{38}	—	June 24, 2017	Haleakala	Pan-STARRS 1	VER	1.9 km	MPC · JPL
789090	2017 NQ_{2}	—	September 16, 2012	Mayhill-ISON	L. Elenin	·	2.4 km	MPC · JPL
789091	2017 NK_{5}	—	August 24, 2008	Kitt Peak	Spacewatch	·	1.6 km	MPC · JPL
789092	2017 NJ_{7}	—	July 5, 2017	Haleakala	Pan-STARRS 1	·	2.2 km	MPC · JPL
789093	2017 ND_{12}	—	July 4, 2017	Haleakala	Pan-STARRS 1	·	1.6 km	MPC · JPL
789094	2017 NW_{12}	—	July 4, 2017	Haleakala	Pan-STARRS 1	·	1.1 km	MPC · JPL
789095	2017 NL_{16}	—	July 2, 2017	Mount Lemmon	Mount Lemmon Survey	·	1.2 km	MPC · JPL
789096	2017 NZ_{17}	—	July 1, 2017	Mount Lemmon	Mount Lemmon Survey	·	1.2 km	MPC · JPL
789097	2017 NA_{18}	—	July 15, 2017	Haleakala	Pan-STARRS 1	EOS	1.3 km	MPC · JPL
789098	2017 NY_{18}	—	July 4, 2017	Haleakala	Pan-STARRS 1	·	1.6 km	MPC · JPL
789099	2017 ND_{19}	—	July 4, 2017	Haleakala	Pan-STARRS 1	·	1.2 km	MPC · JPL
789100	2017 NJ_{24}	—	July 4, 2017	Haleakala	Pan-STARRS 1	EOS	1.5 km	MPC · JPL

== 789101–789200 ==
back to top

Designation			Discovery			Properties		Ref
Permanent	Provisional	Named after	Date	Site	Discoverer(s)	Category	Diam.	Ref
789101	2017 NV_{25}	—	June 5, 2011	Mount Lemmon	Mount Lemmon Survey	LIX	2.6 km	MPC · JPL
789102	2017 ND_{26}	—	July 4, 2017	Haleakala	Pan-STARRS 1	·	1.5 km	MPC · JPL
789103	2017 NR_{26}	—	January 25, 2009	Kitt Peak	Spacewatch	EOS	1.4 km	MPC · JPL
789104	2017 NX_{26}	—	July 5, 2017	Haleakala	Pan-STARRS 1	·	1.9 km	MPC · JPL
789105	2017 NB_{31}	—	July 4, 2017	Haleakala	Pan-STARRS 1	KOR	990 m	MPC · JPL
789106	2017 NC_{33}	—	July 15, 2017	Haleakala	Pan-STARRS 1	·	2.1 km	MPC · JPL
789107	2017 NU_{33}	—	July 4, 2017	Haleakala	Pan-STARRS 1	·	1.7 km	MPC · JPL
789108	2017 NW_{33}	—	July 15, 2017	Haleakala	Pan-STARRS 1	·	2.2 km	MPC · JPL
789109	2017 NG_{35}	—	July 4, 2017	Haleakala	Pan-STARRS 1	·	1.6 km	MPC · JPL
789110	2017 OS_{5}	—	January 17, 2015	Haleakala	Pan-STARRS 1	·	1.3 km	MPC · JPL
789111	2017 OC_{13}	—	February 7, 2011	Mount Lemmon	Mount Lemmon Survey	·	1.1 km	MPC · JPL
789112	2017 ON_{17}	—	July 25, 2017	Haleakala	Pan-STARRS 1	·	2.0 km	MPC · JPL
789113	2017 OZ_{21}	—	May 28, 2012	Mount Lemmon	Mount Lemmon Survey	·	1.1 km	MPC · JPL
789114	2017 OE_{32}	—	July 26, 2017	Haleakala	Pan-STARRS 1	EOS	1.5 km	MPC · JPL
789115	2017 OV_{33}	—	February 27, 2015	Haleakala	Pan-STARRS 1	·	1.7 km	MPC · JPL
789116	2017 OH_{36}	—	August 13, 2012	Haleakala	Pan-STARRS 1	·	1.5 km	MPC · JPL
789117	2017 OU_{38}	—	July 27, 2017	Haleakala	Pan-STARRS 1	LIX	2.7 km	MPC · JPL
789118	2017 OY_{39}	—	March 14, 2010	Mount Lemmon	Mount Lemmon Survey	·	2.8 km	MPC · JPL
789119	2017 OL_{40}	—	February 8, 2011	Mount Lemmon	Mount Lemmon Survey	EUN	880 m	MPC · JPL
789120	2017 OT_{41}	—	October 2, 2013	Kitt Peak	Spacewatch	·	1.0 km	MPC · JPL
789121	2017 OZ_{42}	—	July 27, 2017	Haleakala	Pan-STARRS 1	EOS	1.4 km	MPC · JPL
789122	2017 OW_{43}	—	July 27, 2017	Haleakala	Pan-STARRS 1	·	1.5 km	MPC · JPL
789123	2017 OW_{45}	—	July 27, 2017	Haleakala	Pan-STARRS 1	·	2.1 km	MPC · JPL
789124	2017 OH_{46}	—	July 27, 2017	Haleakala	Pan-STARRS 1	·	1.3 km	MPC · JPL
789125	2017 OO_{51}	—	July 29, 2017	Haleakala	Pan-STARRS 1	THB	1.7 km	MPC · JPL
789126	2017 OY_{54}	—	September 5, 2013	Kitt Peak	Spacewatch	·	1.1 km	MPC · JPL
789127	2017 OP_{56}	—	April 10, 2015	Haleakala	Pan-STARRS 1	·	1.6 km	MPC · JPL
789128	2017 OX_{58}	—	October 8, 2012	Haleakala	Pan-STARRS 1	EOS	1.2 km	MPC · JPL
789129	2017 OZ_{58}	—	July 30, 2017	Haleakala	Pan-STARRS 1	EOS	1.3 km	MPC · JPL
789130	2017 OL_{59}	—	October 10, 2012	Mount Lemmon	Mount Lemmon Survey	·	2.0 km	MPC · JPL
789131	2017 OG_{61}	—	August 20, 2004	Kitt Peak	Spacewatch	·	1.0 km	MPC · JPL
789132	2017 OY_{64}	—	January 17, 2015	Haleakala	Pan-STARRS 1	·	2.0 km	MPC · JPL
789133	2017 OP_{69}	—	July 30, 2017	Haleakala	Pan-STARRS 1	·	1.5 km	MPC · JPL
789134	2017 OD_{70}	—	July 26, 2017	Haleakala	Pan-STARRS 1	·	990 m	MPC · JPL
789135	2017 OH_{70}	—	July 30, 2017	Haleakala	Pan-STARRS 1	·	2.2 km	MPC · JPL
789136	2017 OS_{76}	—	July 30, 2017	Haleakala	Pan-STARRS 1	·	2.1 km	MPC · JPL
789137	2017 OH_{78}	—	July 24, 2017	Haleakala	Pan-STARRS 1	·	1.6 km	MPC · JPL
789138	2017 OX_{82}	—	July 27, 2017	Haleakala	Pan-STARRS 1	·	2.0 km	MPC · JPL
789139	2017 OZ_{83}	—	May 1, 2016	Cerro Tololo	DECam	·	1.3 km	MPC · JPL
789140	2017 OF_{85}	—	July 24, 2017	ESA OGS	ESA OGS	·	2.1 km	MPC · JPL
789141	2017 OA_{87}	—	July 30, 2017	Haleakala	Pan-STARRS 1	·	1.4 km	MPC · JPL
789142	2017 OB_{87}	—	July 25, 2017	Haleakala	Pan-STARRS 1	EOS	1.3 km	MPC · JPL
789143	2017 OP_{87}	—	July 30, 2017	Haleakala	Pan-STARRS 1	·	1.6 km	MPC · JPL
789144	2017 OD_{88}	—	July 26, 2017	Haleakala	Pan-STARRS 1	·	1.3 km	MPC · JPL
789145	2017 OF_{88}	—	July 27, 2017	Haleakala	Pan-STARRS 1	·	1.5 km	MPC · JPL
789146	2017 OM_{89}	—	July 25, 2017	Haleakala	Pan-STARRS 1	·	1.3 km	MPC · JPL
789147	2017 OO_{89}	—	July 26, 2017	Haleakala	Pan-STARRS 1	·	2.0 km	MPC · JPL
789148	2017 OW_{89}	—	July 25, 2017	Haleakala	Pan-STARRS 1	·	2.3 km	MPC · JPL
789149	2017 OU_{90}	—	July 27, 2017	Haleakala	Pan-STARRS 1	EOS	1.3 km	MPC · JPL
789150	2017 OA_{91}	—	July 26, 2017	Haleakala	Pan-STARRS 1	·	2.1 km	MPC · JPL
789151	2017 OL_{92}	—	July 26, 2017	Haleakala	Pan-STARRS 1	·	1.4 km	MPC · JPL
789152	2017 OE_{96}	—	July 30, 2017	Haleakala	Pan-STARRS 1	·	1.3 km	MPC · JPL
789153	2017 ON_{96}	—	July 26, 2017	Haleakala	Pan-STARRS 1	·	1.2 km	MPC · JPL
789154	2017 OW_{96}	—	July 26, 2017	Haleakala	Pan-STARRS 1	·	1.5 km	MPC · JPL
789155	2017 OJ_{97}	—	July 29, 2017	Haleakala	Pan-STARRS 1	EOS	1.4 km	MPC · JPL
789156	2017 OF_{98}	—	July 25, 2017	Haleakala	Pan-STARRS 1	·	1.9 km	MPC · JPL
789157	2017 OL_{98}	—	July 25, 2017	Haleakala	Pan-STARRS 1	·	1.4 km	MPC · JPL
789158	2017 OY_{98}	—	July 25, 2017	Haleakala	Pan-STARRS 1	·	1.2 km	MPC · JPL
789159	2017 OF_{100}	—	July 25, 2017	Haleakala	Pan-STARRS 1	·	1.6 km	MPC · JPL
789160	2017 OB_{101}	—	July 25, 2017	Haleakala	Pan-STARRS 1	·	2.1 km	MPC · JPL
789161	2017 OZ_{101}	—	July 27, 2017	Haleakala	Pan-STARRS 1	·	1.2 km	MPC · JPL
789162	2017 OH_{102}	—	July 25, 2017	Haleakala	Pan-STARRS 1	EOS	1.4 km	MPC · JPL
789163	2017 OF_{103}	—	July 25, 2017	Haleakala	Pan-STARRS 1	·	1.7 km	MPC · JPL
789164	2017 OW_{103}	—	July 26, 2017	Haleakala	Pan-STARRS 1	WIT	690 m	MPC · JPL
789165	2017 OB_{104}	—	July 30, 2017	Haleakala	Pan-STARRS 1	·	1.5 km	MPC · JPL
789166	2017 OS_{105}	—	July 26, 2017	Haleakala	Pan-STARRS 1	·	2.3 km	MPC · JPL
789167	2017 OV_{106}	—	July 26, 2017	Haleakala	Pan-STARRS 1	EOS	1.2 km	MPC · JPL
789168	2017 OK_{107}	—	July 26, 2017	Haleakala	Pan-STARRS 1	·	1.3 km	MPC · JPL
789169	2017 OM_{107}	—	July 26, 2017	Haleakala	Pan-STARRS 1	·	2.4 km	MPC · JPL
789170	2017 OQ_{107}	—	July 27, 2017	Haleakala	Pan-STARRS 1	DOR	1.5 km	MPC · JPL
789171	2017 OX_{107}	—	July 26, 2017	Haleakala	Pan-STARRS 1	·	1.4 km	MPC · JPL
789172	2017 OK_{108}	—	March 12, 2016	Haleakala	Pan-STARRS 1	GEF	720 m	MPC · JPL
789173	2017 OZ_{113}	—	July 25, 2017	Haleakala	Pan-STARRS 1	EOS	1.3 km	MPC · JPL
789174	2017 OC_{114}	—	July 26, 2017	Haleakala	Pan-STARRS 1	·	1.3 km	MPC · JPL
789175	2017 OO_{114}	—	July 29, 2017	Haleakala	Pan-STARRS 1	·	1.2 km	MPC · JPL
789176	2017 OP_{114}	—	July 25, 2017	Haleakala	Pan-STARRS 1	·	2.1 km	MPC · JPL
789177	2017 OS_{114}	—	July 25, 2017	Haleakala	Pan-STARRS 1	·	1.5 km	MPC · JPL
789178	2017 OY_{114}	—	April 4, 2016	Haleakala	Pan-STARRS 1	·	1.4 km	MPC · JPL
789179	2017 OJ_{115}	—	July 26, 2017	Haleakala	Pan-STARRS 1	·	1.4 km	MPC · JPL
789180	2017 OO_{116}	—	July 24, 2017	Haleakala	Pan-STARRS 1	·	2.0 km	MPC · JPL
789181	2017 OQ_{116}	—	July 24, 2017	Haleakala	Pan-STARRS 1	·	2.2 km	MPC · JPL
789182	2017 OS_{116}	—	July 27, 2017	Haleakala	Pan-STARRS 1	·	1.4 km	MPC · JPL
789183	2017 OM_{117}	—	July 27, 2017	Haleakala	Pan-STARRS 1	·	2.4 km	MPC · JPL
789184	2017 OO_{117}	—	July 30, 2017	Haleakala	Pan-STARRS 1	·	1.3 km	MPC · JPL
789185	2017 OS_{118}	—	July 26, 2017	Haleakala	Pan-STARRS 1	·	1.4 km	MPC · JPL
789186	2017 OH_{119}	—	July 29, 2017	Haleakala	Pan-STARRS 1	·	2.1 km	MPC · JPL
789187	2017 OS_{119}	—	July 26, 2017	Haleakala	Pan-STARRS 1	·	1.1 km	MPC · JPL
789188	2017 OY_{120}	—	July 30, 2017	Haleakala	Pan-STARRS 1	EOS	1.3 km	MPC · JPL
789189	2017 OG_{121}	—	July 30, 2017	Haleakala	Pan-STARRS 1	·	1.2 km	MPC · JPL
789190	2017 OM_{121}	—	July 30, 2017	Haleakala	Pan-STARRS 1	·	2.3 km	MPC · JPL
789191	2017 OV_{121}	—	July 30, 2017	Haleakala	Pan-STARRS 1	·	1.7 km	MPC · JPL
789192	2017 OW_{121}	—	July 30, 2017	Haleakala	Pan-STARRS 1	·	2.4 km	MPC · JPL
789193	2017 OB_{124}	—	May 1, 2016	Haleakala	Pan-STARRS 1	·	770 m	MPC · JPL
789194	2017 OG_{130}	—	May 7, 2016	Haleakala	Pan-STARRS 1	·	1.3 km	MPC · JPL
789195	2017 OC_{137}	—	July 30, 2017	Haleakala	Pan-STARRS 1	AGN	820 m	MPC · JPL
789196	2017 OX_{137}	—	July 27, 2017	Haleakala	Pan-STARRS 1	·	2.1 km	MPC · JPL
789197	2017 OD_{138}	—	July 25, 2017	Haleakala	Pan-STARRS 1	EOS	1.4 km	MPC · JPL
789198	2017 OW_{139}	—	January 28, 2014	Kitt Peak	Spacewatch	·	2.0 km	MPC · JPL
789199	2017 OZ_{139}	—	December 3, 2013	Haleakala	Pan-STARRS 1	·	1.4 km	MPC · JPL
789200	2017 OL_{140}	—	July 27, 2017	Haleakala	Pan-STARRS 1	·	1.8 km	MPC · JPL

== 789201–789300 ==
back to top

Designation			Discovery			Properties		Ref
Permanent	Provisional	Named after	Date	Site	Discoverer(s)	Category	Diam.	Ref
789201	2017 OO_{140}	—	July 25, 2017	Haleakala	Pan-STARRS 1	·	1.5 km	MPC · JPL
789202	2017 OU_{140}	—	July 27, 2017	Haleakala	Pan-STARRS 1	·	1.7 km	MPC · JPL
789203	2017 OZ_{140}	—	July 25, 2017	Haleakala	Pan-STARRS 1	EOS	1.4 km	MPC · JPL
789204	2017 OY_{142}	—	May 3, 2016	Cerro Tololo	DECam	KOR	910 m	MPC · JPL
789205	2017 OK_{146}	—	July 25, 2017	Haleakala	Pan-STARRS 1	EOS	1.2 km	MPC · JPL
789206	2017 OZ_{148}	—	March 10, 2016	Mount Lemmon	Mount Lemmon Survey	·	1.3 km	MPC · JPL
789207	2017 ON_{150}	—	November 26, 2013	Mount Lemmon	Mount Lemmon Survey	KOR	1.0 km	MPC · JPL
789208	2017 OA_{151}	—	November 9, 2013	Mount Lemmon	Mount Lemmon Survey	·	1.6 km	MPC · JPL
789209	2017 OH_{151}	—	July 27, 2017	Haleakala	Pan-STARRS 1	·	1.2 km	MPC · JPL
789210	2017 OB_{155}	—	July 26, 2017	Haleakala	Pan-STARRS 1	·	1.1 km	MPC · JPL
789211	2017 OJ_{166}	—	July 29, 2017	Haleakala	Pan-STARRS 1	·	2.4 km	MPC · JPL
789212	2017 OU_{179}	—	July 30, 2017	Haleakala	Pan-STARRS 1	T_{j} (2.97) · EUP	2.3 km	MPC · JPL
789213	2017 OK_{180}	—	July 29, 2017	Haleakala	Pan-STARRS 1	·	2.1 km	MPC · JPL
789214	2017 OY_{180}	—	July 27, 2017	Haleakala	Pan-STARRS 1	·	2.1 km	MPC · JPL
789215	2017 OB_{181}	—	July 26, 2017	Haleakala	Pan-STARRS 1	T_{j} (2.99) · (895)	2.9 km	MPC · JPL
789216	2017 OC_{181}	—	July 27, 2017	Haleakala	Pan-STARRS 1	·	1.6 km	MPC · JPL
789217	2017 OH_{181}	—	July 25, 2017	Haleakala	Pan-STARRS 1	·	2.0 km	MPC · JPL
789218	2017 OZ_{181}	—	July 25, 2017	Haleakala	Pan-STARRS 1	·	1.9 km	MPC · JPL
789219	2017 OE_{182}	—	July 25, 2017	Haleakala	Pan-STARRS 1	·	1.9 km	MPC · JPL
789220	2017 OO_{182}	—	July 30, 2017	Haleakala	Pan-STARRS 1	·	1.6 km	MPC · JPL
789221	2017 ON_{183}	—	July 26, 2017	Haleakala	Pan-STARRS 1	·	1.6 km	MPC · JPL
789222	2017 OU_{183}	—	July 25, 2017	Haleakala	Pan-STARRS 1	VER	1.9 km	MPC · JPL
789223	2017 OW_{183}	—	July 29, 2017	Haleakala	Pan-STARRS 1	·	1.6 km	MPC · JPL
789224	2017 OP_{185}	—	July 25, 2017	Haleakala	Pan-STARRS 1	·	1.6 km	MPC · JPL
789225	2017 OJ_{187}	—	July 25, 2017	Haleakala	Pan-STARRS 1	·	1.8 km	MPC · JPL
789226	2017 OG_{200}	—	July 25, 2017	Haleakala	Pan-STARRS 1	·	2.1 km	MPC · JPL
789227	2017 PY	—	August 1, 2017	Haleakala	Pan-STARRS 1	·	2.0 km	MPC · JPL
789228	2017 PN_{1}	—	October 10, 2012	Mount Lemmon	Mount Lemmon Survey	·	2.0 km	MPC · JPL
789229	2017 PT_{1}	—	January 26, 2014	Haleakala	Pan-STARRS 1	·	1.8 km	MPC · JPL
789230	2017 PK_{3}	—	April 18, 2015	Cerro Tololo	DECam	·	1.5 km	MPC · JPL
789231	2017 PM_{3}	—	August 1, 2017	Haleakala	Pan-STARRS 1	·	1.8 km	MPC · JPL
789232	2017 PA_{5}	—	January 20, 2015	Haleakala	Pan-STARRS 1	·	1.3 km	MPC · JPL
789233	2017 PM_{5}	—	February 16, 2015	Haleakala	Pan-STARRS 1	·	1.4 km	MPC · JPL
789234	2017 PX_{8}	—	February 16, 2015	Haleakala	Pan-STARRS 1	·	1.4 km	MPC · JPL
789235	2017 PB_{9}	—	April 18, 2015	Cerro Tololo	DECam	·	1.7 km	MPC · JPL
789236	2017 PD_{10}	—	January 1, 2009	Kitt Peak	Spacewatch	EOS	1.3 km	MPC · JPL
789237	2017 PF_{11}	—	March 24, 2015	Mount Lemmon	Mount Lemmon Survey	·	1.6 km	MPC · JPL
789238	2017 PA_{13}	—	March 18, 2015	Haleakala	Pan-STARRS 1	3:2	3.9 km	MPC · JPL
789239	2017 PA_{14}	—	January 25, 2014	Haleakala	Pan-STARRS 1	·	1.9 km	MPC · JPL
789240	2017 PB_{16}	—	August 1, 2017	Haleakala	Pan-STARRS 1	THM	1.8 km	MPC · JPL
789241	2017 PQ_{16}	—	March 17, 2015	Mount Lemmon	Mount Lemmon Survey	·	2.2 km	MPC · JPL
789242	2017 PB_{19}	—	February 22, 2009	Kitt Peak	Spacewatch	·	1.8 km	MPC · JPL
789243	2017 PF_{19}	—	July 30, 2017	Haleakala	Pan-STARRS 1	·	1.9 km	MPC · JPL
789244	2017 PT_{21}	—	March 21, 2009	Mount Lemmon	Mount Lemmon Survey	·	1.4 km	MPC · JPL
789245	2017 PJ_{23}	—	August 1, 2017	Haleakala	Pan-STARRS 1	·	1.6 km	MPC · JPL
789246	2017 PQ_{27}	—	August 14, 2017	Oukaïmeden	C. Rinner	·	1.4 km	MPC · JPL
789247	2017 PK_{39}	—	September 4, 2008	Kitt Peak	Spacewatch	·	1.3 km	MPC · JPL
789248	2017 PL_{39}	—	August 15, 2017	Haleakala	Pan-STARRS 1	KOR	940 m	MPC · JPL
789249	2017 PF_{43}	—	August 3, 2017	Haleakala	Pan-STARRS 1	·	1.1 km	MPC · JPL
789250	2017 PR_{48}	—	August 3, 2017	Haleakala	Pan-STARRS 1	·	2.0 km	MPC · JPL
789251	2017 PV_{48}	—	August 6, 2017	Haleakala	Pan-STARRS 1	·	2.4 km	MPC · JPL
789252	2017 PD_{50}	—	August 1, 2017	Haleakala	Pan-STARRS 1	·	2.1 km	MPC · JPL
789253	2017 PQ_{52}	—	April 18, 2015	Mount Lemmon	Mount Lemmon Survey	EOS	1.3 km	MPC · JPL
789254	2017 PZ_{53}	—	August 1, 2017	Haleakala	Pan-STARRS 1	ELF	2.2 km	MPC · JPL
789255	2017 PA_{55}	—	August 3, 2017	Haleakala	Pan-STARRS 1	·	1.9 km	MPC · JPL
789256	2017 PB_{55}	—	August 1, 2017	Haleakala	Pan-STARRS 1	·	2.0 km	MPC · JPL
789257	2017 PV_{56}	—	August 1, 2017	Haleakala	Pan-STARRS 1	·	2.0 km	MPC · JPL
789258	2017 PP_{58}	—	August 1, 2017	Haleakala	Pan-STARRS 1	·	2.1 km	MPC · JPL
789259	2017 PB_{61}	—	January 13, 2015	Haleakala	Pan-STARRS 1	·	1.0 km	MPC · JPL
789260	2017 PC_{61}	—	July 25, 2017	Haleakala	Pan-STARRS 1	·	2.4 km	MPC · JPL
789261	2017 PX_{62}	—	November 1, 2008	Mount Lemmon	Mount Lemmon Survey	KOR	1.0 km	MPC · JPL
789262	2017 PC_{63}	—	August 1, 2017	Haleakala	Pan-STARRS 1	·	1.4 km	MPC · JPL
789263	2017 PT_{63}	—	August 1, 2017	Haleakala	Pan-STARRS 1	·	2.1 km	MPC · JPL
789264	2017 PR_{64}	—	August 1, 2017	Haleakala	Pan-STARRS 1	·	820 m	MPC · JPL
789265	2017 PR_{66}	—	August 3, 2017	Haleakala	Pan-STARRS 1	·	2.0 km	MPC · JPL
789266	2017 PX_{67}	—	August 15, 2017	Haleakala	Pan-STARRS 1	·	2.5 km	MPC · JPL
789267	2017 PZ_{67}	—	August 12, 2017	Haleakala	Pan-STARRS 1	·	1.9 km	MPC · JPL
789268	2017 PA_{69}	—	August 12, 2017	Haleakala	Pan-STARRS 1	·	2.1 km	MPC · JPL
789269	2017 PJ_{69}	—	August 15, 2017	Haleakala	Pan-STARRS 1	·	1.8 km	MPC · JPL
789270	2017 PK_{69}	—	August 14, 2017	Haleakala	Pan-STARRS 1	TIR	2.4 km	MPC · JPL
789271	2017 PA_{70}	—	August 1, 2017	Haleakala	Pan-STARRS 1	MRX	770 m	MPC · JPL
789272	2017 PU_{70}	—	August 3, 2017	Haleakala	Pan-STARRS 1	·	2.0 km	MPC · JPL
789273	2017 PY_{70}	—	January 22, 2015	Haleakala	Pan-STARRS 1	·	1.2 km	MPC · JPL
789274	2017 PL_{71}	—	December 30, 2007	Kitt Peak	Spacewatch	HYG	2.3 km	MPC · JPL
789275	2017 PW_{73}	—	August 3, 2017	Haleakala	Pan-STARRS 1	EOS	1.4 km	MPC · JPL
789276	2017 PZ_{74}	—	August 1, 2017	Haleakala	Pan-STARRS 1	KOR	1.2 km	MPC · JPL
789277	2017 PD_{75}	—	August 1, 2017	Haleakala	Pan-STARRS 1	KOR	1.1 km	MPC · JPL
789278	2017 PG_{84}	—	August 1, 2017	Haleakala	Pan-STARRS 1	ARM	2.2 km	MPC · JPL
789279	2017 PH_{85}	—	August 1, 2017	Haleakala	Pan-STARRS 1	(1118)	2.0 km	MPC · JPL
789280	2017 PL_{85}	—	August 1, 2017	Haleakala	Pan-STARRS 1	·	1.8 km	MPC · JPL
789281	2017 PQ_{86}	—	January 23, 2015	Haleakala	Pan-STARRS 1	·	1.3 km	MPC · JPL
789282	2017 QW_{9}	—	August 1, 2009	Kitt Peak	Spacewatch	·	680 m	MPC · JPL
789283	2017 QL_{10}	—	August 1, 2017	Haleakala	Pan-STARRS 1	·	1.5 km	MPC · JPL
789284	2017 QD_{20}	—	October 19, 2006	Kitt Peak	Deep Ecliptic Survey	HYG	2.2 km	MPC · JPL
789285	2017 QG_{26}	—	August 23, 2017	Haleakala	Pan-STARRS 1	EOS	1.1 km	MPC · JPL
789286	2017 QJ_{27}	—	September 10, 2008	Kitt Peak	Spacewatch	DOR	1.6 km	MPC · JPL
789287	2017 QP_{29}	—	October 21, 2012	Mount Lemmon	Mount Lemmon Survey	TIR	2.1 km	MPC · JPL
789288	2017 QZ_{36}	—	September 14, 2007	Kitt Peak	Spacewatch	·	1.4 km	MPC · JPL
789289	2017 QA_{39}	—	August 16, 2017	Haleakala	Pan-STARRS 1	·	1.5 km	MPC · JPL
789290	2017 QZ_{39}	—	June 25, 2017	Haleakala	Pan-STARRS 1	·	1.4 km	MPC · JPL
789291	2017 QS_{40}	—	October 11, 2012	Mount Lemmon	Mount Lemmon Survey	·	2.0 km	MPC · JPL
789292	2017 QW_{40}	—	July 25, 2017	Haleakala	Pan-STARRS 1	·	1.4 km	MPC · JPL
789293	2017 QN_{41}	—	September 17, 2012	Kitt Peak	Spacewatch	·	1.7 km	MPC · JPL
789294	2017 QL_{42}	—	September 13, 2007	Mount Lemmon	Mount Lemmon Survey	·	1.5 km	MPC · JPL
789295	2017 QP_{42}	—	July 26, 2017	Haleakala	Pan-STARRS 1	·	1.4 km	MPC · JPL
789296	2017 QU_{43}	—	November 9, 2013	Mount Lemmon	Mount Lemmon Survey	·	1.3 km	MPC · JPL
789297	2017 QK_{44}	—	March 30, 2016	Haleakala	Pan-STARRS 1	·	1.5 km	MPC · JPL
789298	2017 QE_{49}	—	August 25, 2012	Kitt Peak	Spacewatch	·	1.5 km	MPC · JPL
789299	2017 QJ_{55}	—	September 3, 2008	Kitt Peak	Spacewatch	·	1.5 km	MPC · JPL
789300	2017 QZ_{56}	—	July 26, 2017	Haleakala	Pan-STARRS 1	·	1.4 km	MPC · JPL

== 789301–789400 ==
back to top

Designation			Discovery			Properties		Ref
Permanent	Provisional	Named after	Date	Site	Discoverer(s)	Category	Diam.	Ref
789301	2017 QG_{57}	—	August 19, 2017	Haleakala	Pan-STARRS 1	NAE	1.6 km	MPC · JPL
789302	2017 QO_{57}	—	July 29, 2017	Haleakala	Pan-STARRS 1	·	2.6 km	MPC · JPL
789303	2017 QQ_{57}	—	May 3, 2016	Cerro Tololo	DECam	·	1.4 km	MPC · JPL
789304	2017 QO_{58}	—	March 15, 2007	Mount Lemmon	Mount Lemmon Survey	ADE	1.6 km	MPC · JPL
789305	2017 QX_{59}	—	September 26, 2006	Mount Lemmon	Mount Lemmon Survey	·	2.0 km	MPC · JPL
789306	2017 QH_{65}	—	February 19, 2015	Kitt Peak	Spacewatch	·	1.9 km	MPC · JPL
789307	2017 QC_{66}	—	July 26, 2017	Haleakala	Pan-STARRS 1	EUP	2.1 km	MPC · JPL
789308	2017 QX_{67}	—	August 31, 2017	Haleakala	Pan-STARRS 1	·	1.9 km	MPC · JPL
789309	2017 QY_{67}	—	August 24, 2017	Haleakala	Pan-STARRS 1	·	2.6 km	MPC · JPL
789310	2017 QK_{74}	—	August 22, 2017	Haleakala	Pan-STARRS 1	·	2.0 km	MPC · JPL
789311	2017 QB_{77}	—	August 22, 2017	Haleakala	Pan-STARRS 1	·	2.1 km	MPC · JPL
789312	2017 QE_{79}	—	August 31, 2017	Haleakala	Pan-STARRS 1	·	2.3 km	MPC · JPL
789313	2017 QW_{82}	—	August 31, 2017	Mount Lemmon	Mount Lemmon Survey	·	2.3 km	MPC · JPL
789314	2017 QN_{83}	—	August 24, 2017	Haleakala	Pan-STARRS 1	·	2.0 km	MPC · JPL
789315	2017 QU_{83}	—	August 24, 2017	Haleakala	Pan-STARRS 1	VER	2.0 km	MPC · JPL
789316	2017 QU_{87}	—	August 16, 2017	Haleakala	Pan-STARRS 1	·	2.3 km	MPC · JPL
789317	2017 QW_{87}	—	August 31, 2017	Haleakala	Pan-STARRS 1	EMA	2.4 km	MPC · JPL
789318	2017 QF_{89}	—	August 31, 2017	Haleakala	Pan-STARRS 1	·	2.0 km	MPC · JPL
789319	2017 QS_{91}	—	October 20, 2012	Kitt Peak	Spacewatch	·	1.8 km	MPC · JPL
789320	2017 QV_{91}	—	October 15, 2012	Haleakala	Pan-STARRS 1	·	1.9 km	MPC · JPL
789321	2017 QA_{92}	—	August 31, 2017	Haleakala	Pan-STARRS 1	·	1.5 km	MPC · JPL
789322	2017 QO_{92}	—	August 31, 2017	Haleakala	Pan-STARRS 1	·	1.6 km	MPC · JPL
789323	2017 QQ_{92}	—	August 31, 2017	Haleakala	Pan-STARRS 1	VER	1.6 km	MPC · JPL
789324	2017 QY_{92}	—	August 16, 2017	Haleakala	Pan-STARRS 1	·	1.9 km	MPC · JPL
789325	2017 QJ_{94}	—	August 31, 2017	Mount Lemmon	Mount Lemmon Survey	·	2.0 km	MPC · JPL
789326	2017 QN_{94}	—	August 18, 2017	Haleakala	Pan-STARRS 1	EOS	1.4 km	MPC · JPL
789327	2017 QR_{94}	—	August 31, 2017	Haleakala	Pan-STARRS 1	VER	1.9 km	MPC · JPL
789328	2017 QH_{97}	—	August 23, 2017	Haleakala	Pan-STARRS 1	·	2.0 km	MPC · JPL
789329	2017 QN_{97}	—	August 18, 2017	Haleakala	Pan-STARRS 1	·	2.3 km	MPC · JPL
789330	2017 QW_{97}	—	August 31, 2017	Haleakala	Pan-STARRS 1	KOR	1.1 km	MPC · JPL
789331	2017 QY_{97}	—	August 23, 2017	Haleakala	Pan-STARRS 1	·	2.2 km	MPC · JPL
789332	2017 QG_{98}	—	August 23, 2017	Haleakala	Pan-STARRS 1	·	1.4 km	MPC · JPL
789333	2017 QN_{99}	—	August 23, 2017	Haleakala	Pan-STARRS 1	·	1.7 km	MPC · JPL
789334	2017 QG_{100}	—	August 18, 2017	Haleakala	Pan-STARRS 1	·	1.5 km	MPC · JPL
789335	2017 QW_{101}	—	August 19, 2017	Haleakala	Pan-STARRS 1	·	1.4 km	MPC · JPL
789336	2017 QZ_{101}	—	August 31, 2017	Mount Lemmon	Mount Lemmon Survey	·	2.3 km	MPC · JPL
789337	2017 QN_{107}	—	August 31, 2017	Haleakala	Pan-STARRS 1	·	1.8 km	MPC · JPL
789338	2017 QB_{108}	—	January 21, 2015	Haleakala	Pan-STARRS 1	·	1.7 km	MPC · JPL
789339	2017 QC_{109}	—	August 24, 2017	Haleakala	Pan-STARRS 1	·	1.7 km	MPC · JPL
789340	2017 QU_{112}	—	August 16, 2017	Haleakala	Pan-STARRS 1	·	2.0 km	MPC · JPL
789341	2017 QZ_{112}	—	July 25, 2017	Haleakala	Pan-STARRS 1	NEM	1.6 km	MPC · JPL
789342	2017 QE_{113}	—	August 24, 2017	Haleakala	Pan-STARRS 1	·	2.1 km	MPC · JPL
789343	2017 QK_{113}	—	August 23, 2017	Haleakala	Pan-STARRS 1	·	1.9 km	MPC · JPL
789344	2017 QL_{113}	—	August 31, 2017	Haleakala	Pan-STARRS 1	·	1.8 km	MPC · JPL
789345	2017 QM_{115}	—	April 19, 2015	Cerro Tololo	DECam	·	1.9 km	MPC · JPL
789346	2017 QY_{115}	—	August 23, 2017	Haleakala	Pan-STARRS 1	EOS	1.1 km	MPC · JPL
789347	2017 QQ_{116}	—	April 16, 2016	Haleakala	Pan-STARRS 1	·	1.3 km	MPC · JPL
789348	2017 QP_{118}	—	August 16, 2017	Haleakala	Pan-STARRS 1	·	1.3 km	MPC · JPL
789349	2017 QF_{119}	—	August 18, 2017	ESA OGS	ESA OGS	EOS	1.2 km	MPC · JPL
789350	2017 QH_{119}	—	August 31, 2017	Mount Lemmon	Mount Lemmon Survey	·	2.8 km	MPC · JPL
789351	2017 QP_{119}	—	August 16, 2017	Haleakala	Pan-STARRS 1	·	2.2 km	MPC · JPL
789352	2017 QX_{119}	—	August 28, 2017	Mount Lemmon	Mount Lemmon Survey	·	1.8 km	MPC · JPL
789353	2017 QF_{120}	—	August 23, 2017	Haleakala	Pan-STARRS 1	·	1.4 km	MPC · JPL
789354	2017 QM_{120}	—	April 10, 2015	Mount Lemmon	Mount Lemmon Survey	EOS	1.3 km	MPC · JPL
789355	2017 QD_{121}	—	August 18, 2017	Haleakala	Pan-STARRS 1	·	2.2 km	MPC · JPL
789356	2017 QL_{121}	—	January 28, 2014	Kitt Peak	Spacewatch	·	2.2 km	MPC · JPL
789357	2017 QW_{121}	—	August 31, 2017	Haleakala	Pan-STARRS 1	·	1.9 km	MPC · JPL
789358	2017 QJ_{122}	—	August 28, 2017	Mount Lemmon	Mount Lemmon Survey	·	2.0 km	MPC · JPL
789359	2017 QP_{122}	—	April 18, 2015	Cerro Tololo	DECam	·	1.9 km	MPC · JPL
789360	2017 QQ_{122}	—	August 31, 2017	Haleakala	Pan-STARRS 1	KOR	1.1 km	MPC · JPL
789361	2017 QF_{124}	—	August 31, 2017	Mount Lemmon	Mount Lemmon Survey	·	2.4 km	MPC · JPL
789362	2017 QL_{124}	—	August 31, 2017	Haleakala	Pan-STARRS 1	·	1.9 km	MPC · JPL
789363	2017 QO_{124}	—	August 31, 2017	Haleakala	Pan-STARRS 1	EOS	1.2 km	MPC · JPL
789364	2017 QV_{124}	—	August 16, 2017	Haleakala	Pan-STARRS 1	·	1.8 km	MPC · JPL
789365	2017 QB_{125}	—	August 16, 2017	Haleakala	Pan-STARRS 1	EOS	1.1 km	MPC · JPL
789366	2017 QE_{126}	—	August 30, 2017	Mount Lemmon	Mount Lemmon Survey	·	1.7 km	MPC · JPL
789367	2017 QS_{132}	—	August 16, 2017	Haleakala	Pan-STARRS 1	·	1.9 km	MPC · JPL
789368	2017 QH_{136}	—	August 18, 2017	Haleakala	Pan-STARRS 1	·	2.1 km	MPC · JPL
789369	2017 QF_{145}	—	August 22, 2017	Haleakala	Pan-STARRS 1	·	1.8 km	MPC · JPL
789370	2017 QE_{147}	—	August 18, 2017	Haleakala	Pan-STARRS 1	·	1.6 km	MPC · JPL
789371	2017 QP_{147}	—	August 16, 2017	Haleakala	Pan-STARRS 1	·	1.7 km	MPC · JPL
789372	2017 QW_{149}	—	August 24, 2017	Haleakala	Pan-STARRS 1	·	2.8 km	MPC · JPL
789373	2017 QK_{150}	—	August 24, 2017	Haleakala	Pan-STARRS 1	·	2.1 km	MPC · JPL
789374	2017 QR_{150}	—	August 18, 2017	Haleakala	Pan-STARRS 1	·	1.6 km	MPC · JPL
789375	2017 QD_{151}	—	August 31, 2017	Haleakala	Pan-STARRS 1	·	1.9 km	MPC · JPL
789376	2017 QQ_{151}	—	August 23, 2017	Haleakala	Pan-STARRS 1	·	1.4 km	MPC · JPL
789377	2017 QH_{152}	—	August 20, 2017	Haleakala	Pan-STARRS 1	·	1.5 km	MPC · JPL
789378	2017 QP_{152}	—	August 24, 2017	Haleakala	Pan-STARRS 1	·	2.2 km	MPC · JPL
789379	2017 QX_{152}	—	August 31, 2017	Haleakala	Pan-STARRS 1	·	2.1 km	MPC · JPL
789380	2017 QE_{156}	—	August 16, 2017	Haleakala	Pan-STARRS 1	·	1.8 km	MPC · JPL
789381	2017 QY_{157}	—	August 18, 2017	Haleakala	Pan-STARRS 1	·	1.3 km	MPC · JPL
789382	2017 QN_{158}	—	August 31, 2017	Haleakala	Pan-STARRS 1	·	2.2 km	MPC · JPL
789383	2017 QR_{167}	—	August 16, 2017	Haleakala	Pan-STARRS 1	·	1.9 km	MPC · JPL
789384	2017 QH_{181}	—	August 18, 2017	Haleakala	Pan-STARRS 1	·	2.1 km	MPC · JPL
789385	2017 QP_{181}	—	August 18, 2017	Haleakala	Pan-STARRS 1	ARM	2.1 km	MPC · JPL
789386	2017 QQ_{181}	—	August 18, 2017	Haleakala	Pan-STARRS 1	·	2.3 km	MPC · JPL
789387	2017 QL_{182}	—	August 16, 2017	Haleakala	Pan-STARRS 1	·	2.0 km	MPC · JPL
789388	2017 QA_{183}	—	August 31, 2017	Mount Lemmon	Mount Lemmon Survey	EOS	1.4 km	MPC · JPL
789389	2017 QG_{183}	—	August 24, 2017	Haleakala	Pan-STARRS 1	·	2.6 km	MPC · JPL
789390	2017 QH_{183}	—	August 31, 2017	Haleakala	Pan-STARRS 1	·	2.7 km	MPC · JPL
789391	2017 QS_{183}	—	August 16, 2017	Haleakala	Pan-STARRS 1	TIR	1.8 km	MPC · JPL
789392	2017 QW_{184}	—	August 31, 2017	Mount Lemmon	Mount Lemmon Survey	·	2.2 km	MPC · JPL
789393	2017 QT_{185}	—	August 18, 2017	Haleakala	Pan-STARRS 1	EOS	1.4 km	MPC · JPL
789394	2017 QO_{186}	—	August 24, 2017	Haleakala	Pan-STARRS 1	·	2.2 km	MPC · JPL
789395	2017 QY_{186}	—	August 28, 2017	Mount Lemmon	Mount Lemmon Survey	·	1.7 km	MPC · JPL
789396	2017 QZ_{186}	—	August 24, 2017	Haleakala	Pan-STARRS 1	·	2.4 km	MPC · JPL
789397	2017 QG_{187}	—	August 31, 2017	Haleakala	Pan-STARRS 1	·	2.1 km	MPC · JPL
789398	2017 QJ_{187}	—	August 31, 2017	Mount Lemmon	Mount Lemmon Survey	·	2.4 km	MPC · JPL
789399	2017 QW_{187}	—	January 22, 2015	Haleakala	Pan-STARRS 1	·	1.3 km	MPC · JPL
789400	2017 QR_{188}	—	September 13, 2007	Mount Lemmon	Mount Lemmon Survey	·	1.4 km	MPC · JPL

== 789401–789500 ==
back to top

Designation			Discovery			Properties		Ref
Permanent	Provisional	Named after	Date	Site	Discoverer(s)	Category	Diam.	Ref
789401	2017 QD_{189}	—	August 24, 2017	Haleakala	Pan-STARRS 1	·	1.4 km	MPC · JPL
789402	2017 QS_{189}	—	August 24, 2017	Haleakala	Pan-STARRS 1	(5651)	2.0 km	MPC · JPL
789403	2017 QF_{190}	—	August 24, 2017	Haleakala	Pan-STARRS 1	(31811)	2.2 km	MPC · JPL
789404	2017 QG_{190}	—	August 16, 2017	Haleakala	Pan-STARRS 1	·	1.6 km	MPC · JPL
789405	2017 QZ_{204}	—	January 26, 2020	Haleakala	Pan-STARRS 2	·	1.8 km	MPC · JPL
789406	2017 QV_{216}	—	August 17, 2017	Haleakala	Pan-STARRS 1	·	2.5 km	MPC · JPL
789407	2017 RJ_{3}	—	May 24, 2011	Haleakala	Pan-STARRS 1	·	1.8 km	MPC · JPL
789408	2017 RW_{3}	—	April 30, 2012	Mount Lemmon	Mount Lemmon Survey	·	1.0 km	MPC · JPL
789409	2017 RH_{5}	—	December 3, 2008	Mount Lemmon	Mount Lemmon Survey	·	1.9 km	MPC · JPL
789410	2017 RA_{10}	—	February 16, 2015	Haleakala	Pan-STARRS 1	·	1.2 km	MPC · JPL
789411	2017 RX_{10}	—	January 7, 2014	Mount Lemmon	Mount Lemmon Survey	THM	1.7 km	MPC · JPL
789412	2017 RS_{11}	—	October 3, 2013	Haleakala	Pan-STARRS 1	·	970 m	MPC · JPL
789413	2017 RM_{22}	—	July 26, 2011	Haleakala	Pan-STARRS 1	·	2.3 km	MPC · JPL
789414	2017 RS_{22}	—	August 3, 2017	Haleakala	Pan-STARRS 1	EUP	2.5 km	MPC · JPL
789415	2017 RH_{26}	—	August 16, 2017	Haleakala	Pan-STARRS 1	·	2.0 km	MPC · JPL
789416	2017 RQ_{26}	—	June 5, 2016	Haleakala	Pan-STARRS 1	·	1.5 km	MPC · JPL
789417	2017 RV_{29}	—	February 19, 2009	Kitt Peak	Spacewatch	·	2.3 km	MPC · JPL
789418	2017 RF_{30}	—	May 9, 2016	Mount Lemmon	Mount Lemmon Survey	·	1.5 km	MPC · JPL
789419	2017 RL_{30}	—	September 28, 2008	Mount Lemmon	Mount Lemmon Survey	AGN	930 m	MPC · JPL
789420	2017 RP_{30}	—	August 18, 2017	Haleakala	Pan-STARRS 1	·	1.3 km	MPC · JPL
789421	2017 RE_{32}	—	April 18, 2015	Cerro Tololo	DECam	VER	1.9 km	MPC · JPL
789422	2017 RF_{33}	—	February 26, 2014	Haleakala	Pan-STARRS 1	TIR	1.8 km	MPC · JPL
789423	2017 RA_{36}	—	November 19, 2003	Kitt Peak	Spacewatch	·	1.6 km	MPC · JPL
789424	2017 RS_{36}	—	August 2, 2011	Haleakala	Pan-STARRS 1	(895)	2.6 km	MPC · JPL
789425	2017 RU_{38}	—	September 17, 2006	Kitt Peak	Spacewatch	·	2.1 km	MPC · JPL
789426	2017 RX_{38}	—	August 16, 2017	Haleakala	Pan-STARRS 1	·	1.3 km	MPC · JPL
789427	2017 RZ_{38}	—	September 14, 2017	Haleakala	Pan-STARRS 1	·	780 m	MPC · JPL
789428	2017 RZ_{39}	—	September 14, 2017	Haleakala	Pan-STARRS 1	EOS	1.2 km	MPC · JPL
789429	2017 RD_{40}	—	August 30, 2011	Haleakala	Pan-STARRS 1	·	2.1 km	MPC · JPL
789430	2017 RN_{41}	—	August 21, 2001	Kitt Peak	Spacewatch	·	2.1 km	MPC · JPL
789431	2017 RA_{43}	—	March 5, 2008	Mount Lemmon	Mount Lemmon Survey	·	1.8 km	MPC · JPL
789432	2017 RE_{43}	—	February 28, 2014	Haleakala	Pan-STARRS 1	·	2.3 km	MPC · JPL
789433	2017 RW_{47}	—	August 28, 2001	Kitt Peak	Spacewatch	·	1.6 km	MPC · JPL
789434	2017 RL_{51}	—	September 17, 2006	Kitt Peak	Spacewatch	VER	2.0 km	MPC · JPL
789435	2017 RH_{52}	—	September 14, 2017	Haleakala	Pan-STARRS 1	·	1.9 km	MPC · JPL
789436	2017 RS_{52}	—	February 20, 2009	Kitt Peak	Spacewatch	·	1.5 km	MPC · JPL
789437	2017 RA_{54}	—	November 5, 2007	Mount Lemmon	Mount Lemmon Survey	·	1.6 km	MPC · JPL
789438	2017 RP_{54}	—	September 17, 2006	Kitt Peak	Spacewatch	·	1.9 km	MPC · JPL
789439	2017 RJ_{55}	—	August 27, 2006	Kitt Peak	Spacewatch	·	2.1 km	MPC · JPL
789440	2017 RX_{55}	—	April 19, 2015	Cerro Tololo	DECam	·	1.5 km	MPC · JPL
789441	2017 RD_{58}	—	April 17, 2009	Kitt Peak	Spacewatch	·	2.4 km	MPC · JPL
789442	2017 RT_{58}	—	September 12, 2007	Mount Lemmon	Mount Lemmon Survey	·	1.5 km	MPC · JPL
789443	2017 RG_{62}	—	October 11, 2012	Haleakala	Pan-STARRS 1	·	2.0 km	MPC · JPL
789444	2017 RM_{64}	—	August 26, 2009	Catalina	CSS	3:2	4.6 km	MPC · JPL
789445	2017 RQ_{65}	—	September 14, 2017	Haleakala	Pan-STARRS 1	·	1.5 km	MPC · JPL
789446	2017 RY_{65}	—	February 15, 2010	Kitt Peak	Spacewatch	·	1.5 km	MPC · JPL
789447	2017 RD_{66}	—	August 31, 2017	Haleakala	Pan-STARRS 1	·	1.2 km	MPC · JPL
789448	2017 RZ_{66}	—	September 14, 2017	Haleakala	Pan-STARRS 1	·	2.1 km	MPC · JPL
789449	2017 RA_{70}	—	September 14, 2017	Haleakala	Pan-STARRS 1	·	2.4 km	MPC · JPL
789450	2017 RD_{74}	—	October 1, 2013	Mount Lemmon	Mount Lemmon Survey	·	1.3 km	MPC · JPL
789451	2017 RO_{78}	—	October 8, 2012	Kitt Peak	Spacewatch	EOS	1.4 km	MPC · JPL
789452	2017 RF_{82}	—	September 26, 2006	Kitt Peak	Spacewatch	·	2.0 km	MPC · JPL
789453	2017 RQ_{82}	—	October 21, 2012	Mount Lemmon	Mount Lemmon Survey	·	1.9 km	MPC · JPL
789454	2017 RF_{84}	—	September 4, 2008	Kitt Peak	Spacewatch	·	1.4 km	MPC · JPL
789455	2017 RZ_{84}	—	September 15, 2017	Haleakala	Pan-STARRS 1	·	2.3 km	MPC · JPL
789456	2017 RA_{87}	—	October 18, 2012	Haleakala	Pan-STARRS 1	EOS	1.4 km	MPC · JPL
789457	2017 RV_{88}	—	November 2, 2007	Kitt Peak	Spacewatch	·	1.6 km	MPC · JPL
789458	2017 RX_{88}	—	August 24, 2017	Haleakala	Pan-STARRS 1	HOF	1.9 km	MPC · JPL
789459	2017 RK_{90}	—	August 31, 2017	Haleakala	Pan-STARRS 1	·	950 m	MPC · JPL
789460	2017 RU_{90}	—	September 15, 2017	Haleakala	Pan-STARRS 1	·	1.9 km	MPC · JPL
789461	2017 RT_{91}	—	August 31, 2017	Haleakala	Pan-STARRS 1	·	2.1 km	MPC · JPL
789462	2017 RZ_{93}	—	March 29, 2001	Kitt Peak	SKADS	·	1.8 km	MPC · JPL
789463	2017 RU_{94}	—	August 24, 2017	Haleakala	Pan-STARRS 1	·	2.3 km	MPC · JPL
789464	2017 RV_{94}	—	June 8, 2016	Mount Lemmon	Mount Lemmon Survey	·	1.9 km	MPC · JPL
789465	2017 RR_{95}	—	November 12, 2012	Mount Lemmon	Mount Lemmon Survey	THM	1.5 km	MPC · JPL
789466	2017 RA_{96}	—	February 18, 2015	Haleakala	Pan-STARRS 1	·	1.3 km	MPC · JPL
789467	2017 RF_{96}	—	January 13, 2008	Kitt Peak	Spacewatch	THM	1.7 km	MPC · JPL
789468	2017 RP_{98}	—	January 24, 2014	Haleakala	Pan-STARRS 1	·	1.9 km	MPC · JPL
789469	2017 RU_{101}	—	August 24, 2017	Haleakala	Pan-STARRS 1	·	2.2 km	MPC · JPL
789470	2017 RL_{102}	—	September 19, 2006	Kitt Peak	Spacewatch	·	1.9 km	MPC · JPL
789471	2017 RF_{103}	—	December 27, 2013	Mount Lemmon	Mount Lemmon Survey	EOS	1.7 km	MPC · JPL
789472	2017 RD_{105}	—	October 10, 2012	Mount Lemmon	Mount Lemmon Survey	·	1.8 km	MPC · JPL
789473	2017 RQ_{105}	—	September 11, 2017	Haleakala	Pan-STARRS 1	·	1.6 km	MPC · JPL
789474	2017 RZ_{105}	—	September 11, 2017	Haleakala	Pan-STARRS 1	·	1.6 km	MPC · JPL
789475	2017 RT_{106}	—	April 18, 2015	Cerro Tololo	DECam	·	2.2 km	MPC · JPL
789476	2017 RP_{107}	—	January 3, 2014	Mount Lemmon	Mount Lemmon Survey	·	1.4 km	MPC · JPL
789477	2017 RZ_{107}	—	November 13, 2012	Mount Lemmon	Mount Lemmon Survey	·	2.3 km	MPC · JPL
789478	2017 RU_{108}	—	January 16, 2015	Haleakala	Pan-STARRS 1	·	1.5 km	MPC · JPL
789479	2017 RB_{109}	—	September 11, 2017	Haleakala	Pan-STARRS 1	EOS	1.3 km	MPC · JPL
789480	2017 RP_{110}	—	September 1, 2017	Haleakala	Pan-STARRS 1	·	1.7 km	MPC · JPL
789481	2017 RB_{111}	—	May 21, 2015	Cerro Tololo	DECam	·	2.2 km	MPC · JPL
789482	2017 RX_{111}	—	September 2, 2017	Haleakala	Pan-STARRS 1	·	2.6 km	MPC · JPL
789483	2017 RR_{114}	—	September 2, 2017	Haleakala	Pan-STARRS 1	·	2.7 km	MPC · JPL
789484	2017 RT_{118}	—	September 2, 2017	Haleakala	Pan-STARRS 1	·	2.4 km	MPC · JPL
789485	2017 RL_{120}	—	September 1, 2017	Haleakala	Pan-STARRS 1	3:2 · (3561)	3.9 km	MPC · JPL
789486	2017 RN_{120}	—	September 15, 2017	Haleakala	Pan-STARRS 1	·	1.2 km	MPC · JPL
789487	2017 RV_{121}	—	September 2, 2017	Haleakala	Pan-STARRS 1	EOS	1.8 km	MPC · JPL
789488	2017 RA_{123}	—	September 2, 2017	Haleakala	Pan-STARRS 1	·	1.3 km	MPC · JPL
789489	2017 RX_{123}	—	September 15, 2017	Haleakala	Pan-STARRS 1	·	1.3 km	MPC · JPL
789490	2017 RF_{124}	—	September 13, 2017	Haleakala	Pan-STARRS 1	·	2.4 km	MPC · JPL
789491	2017 RG_{124}	—	September 2, 2017	Mount Lemmon	Mount Lemmon Survey	·	1.6 km	MPC · JPL
789492	2017 RO_{124}	—	September 14, 2017	Haleakala	Pan-STARRS 1	EOS	1.3 km	MPC · JPL
789493	2017 RK_{125}	—	September 11, 2017	Haleakala	Pan-STARRS 1	·	2.4 km	MPC · JPL
789494	2017 RM_{125}	—	September 11, 2017	Haleakala	Pan-STARRS 1	·	2.3 km	MPC · JPL
789495	2017 RW_{128}	—	September 2, 2017	Haleakala	Pan-STARRS 1	TIR	2.2 km	MPC · JPL
789496	2017 RN_{129}	—	September 1, 2017	Mount Lemmon	Mount Lemmon Survey	·	2.1 km	MPC · JPL
789497	2017 RT_{129}	—	April 18, 2015	Cerro Tololo	DECam	EOS	1.3 km	MPC · JPL
789498	2017 RV_{129}	—	September 14, 2017	Haleakala	Pan-STARRS 1	·	2.1 km	MPC · JPL
789499	2017 RE_{130}	—	September 15, 2017	Haleakala	Pan-STARRS 1	·	1.9 km	MPC · JPL
789500	2017 RO_{132}	—	September 15, 2017	Haleakala	Pan-STARRS 1	·	950 m	MPC · JPL

== 789501–789600 ==
back to top

Designation			Discovery			Properties		Ref
Permanent	Provisional	Named after	Date	Site	Discoverer(s)	Category	Diam.	Ref
789501	2017 RC_{133}	—	September 15, 2017	Haleakala	Pan-STARRS 1	·	1.4 km	MPC · JPL
789502	2017 RN_{133}	—	September 15, 2017	Haleakala	Pan-STARRS 1	·	1.3 km	MPC · JPL
789503	2017 RF_{134}	—	September 11, 2017	Haleakala	Pan-STARRS 1	·	2.1 km	MPC · JPL
789504	2017 RR_{140}	—	September 2, 2017	Haleakala	Pan-STARRS 1	EUP	2.4 km	MPC · JPL
789505	2017 RH_{141}	—	November 7, 2012	Mount Lemmon	Mount Lemmon Survey	LIX	2.4 km	MPC · JPL
789506	2017 RU_{141}	—	September 12, 2017	Kitt Peak	Spacewatch	·	2.0 km	MPC · JPL
789507	2017 RF_{144}	—	April 14, 2015	Mount Lemmon	Mount Lemmon Survey	·	1.5 km	MPC · JPL
789508	2017 RY_{144}	—	September 1, 2017	Mount Lemmon	Mount Lemmon Survey	·	1.7 km	MPC · JPL
789509	2017 RC_{145}	—	November 27, 2013	Haleakala	Pan-STARRS 1	KOR	1.2 km	MPC · JPL
789510	2017 RX_{146}	—	September 11, 2017	Haleakala	Pan-STARRS 1	·	2.0 km	MPC · JPL
789511	2017 RZ_{146}	—	September 15, 2017	Haleakala	Pan-STARRS 1	EOS	1.2 km	MPC · JPL
789512	2017 RJ_{150}	—	March 30, 2015	Haleakala	Pan-STARRS 1	VER	1.8 km	MPC · JPL
789513	2017 RU_{150}	—	September 15, 2017	Haleakala	Pan-STARRS 1	·	1.6 km	MPC · JPL
789514	2017 RE_{151}	—	September 14, 2017	Haleakala	Pan-STARRS 1	·	1.7 km	MPC · JPL
789515	2017 RY_{151}	—	September 13, 2017	Haleakala	Pan-STARRS 1	·	1.7 km	MPC · JPL
789516	2017 RB_{152}	—	September 15, 2017	Haleakala	Pan-STARRS 1	·	2.5 km	MPC · JPL
789517	2017 RY_{162}	—	September 13, 2017	Haleakala	Pan-STARRS 1	·	2.3 km	MPC · JPL
789518	2017 RZ_{162}	—	October 22, 2006	Kitt Peak	Spacewatch	·	2.4 km	MPC · JPL
789519	2017 RD_{163}	—	September 2, 2017	Mount Lemmon	Mount Lemmon Survey	·	2.3 km	MPC · JPL
789520	2017 RH_{163}	—	September 13, 2017	Haleakala	Pan-STARRS 1	·	2.0 km	MPC · JPL
789521	2017 RL_{163}	—	September 15, 2017	Haleakala	Pan-STARRS 1	·	2.5 km	MPC · JPL
789522	2017 RC_{164}	—	September 28, 2006	Kitt Peak	Spacewatch	VER	1.7 km	MPC · JPL
789523	2017 RJ_{164}	—	October 11, 2012	Haleakala	Pan-STARRS 1	EOS	1.3 km	MPC · JPL
789524	2017 RB_{166}	—	September 1, 2017	Mount Lemmon	Mount Lemmon Survey	EOS	1.4 km	MPC · JPL
789525	2017 RE_{166}	—	September 8, 2017	Haleakala	Pan-STARRS 1	·	2.3 km	MPC · JPL
789526	2017 RD_{176}	—	September 13, 2017	Haleakala	Pan-STARRS 1	·	2.5 km	MPC · JPL
789527	2017 SV_{3}	—	September 16, 2017	Haleakala	Pan-STARRS 1	·	2.1 km	MPC · JPL
789528	2017 SV_{7}	—	August 22, 2017	Haleakala	Pan-STARRS 1	·	2.1 km	MPC · JPL
789529	2017 SN_{14}	—	September 24, 2017	Catalina	CSS	ATE	570 m	MPC · JPL
789530	2017 SE_{19}	—	September 22, 2017	Haleakala	Pan-STARRS 1	AMO · APO · PHA	380 m	MPC · JPL
789531	2017 SF_{23}	—	February 16, 2015	Haleakala	Pan-STARRS 1	·	1.4 km	MPC · JPL
789532	2017 SC_{24}	—	February 17, 2015	Haleakala	Pan-STARRS 1	·	1.3 km	MPC · JPL
789533	2017 SG_{25}	—	February 3, 2009	Kitt Peak	Spacewatch	·	1.7 km	MPC · JPL
789534	2017 SK_{26}	—	November 4, 2007	Mount Lemmon	Mount Lemmon Survey	·	1.3 km	MPC · JPL
789535	2017 SK_{28}	—	March 16, 2015	Haleakala	Pan-STARRS 1	·	1.7 km	MPC · JPL
789536	2017 SF_{29}	—	January 18, 2013	Haleakala	Pan-STARRS 1	·	2.3 km	MPC · JPL
789537	2017 SV_{29}	—	January 20, 2015	Haleakala	Pan-STARRS 1	KOR	1.0 km	MPC · JPL
789538	2017 SE_{32}	—	May 20, 2015	Cerro Tololo	DECam	·	2.2 km	MPC · JPL
789539	2017 SJ_{32}	—	November 17, 2004	Campo Imperatore	CINEOS	·	1.9 km	MPC · JPL
789540	2017 SE_{40}	—	August 24, 2017	Haleakala	Pan-STARRS 1	·	2.7 km	MPC · JPL
789541	2017 SG_{42}	—	November 20, 2007	Mount Lemmon	Mount Lemmon Survey	·	1.4 km	MPC · JPL
789542	2017 SW_{44}	—	September 16, 2017	Haleakala	Pan-STARRS 1	·	1.3 km	MPC · JPL
789543	2017 SG_{47}	—	October 10, 2012	Haleakala	Pan-STARRS 1	·	2.1 km	MPC · JPL
789544	2017 SZ_{48}	—	April 19, 2007	Kitt Peak	Spacewatch	NEM	1.6 km	MPC · JPL
789545	2017 SP_{49}	—	October 23, 2012	Kitt Peak	Spacewatch	·	1.8 km	MPC · JPL
789546	2017 SF_{50}	—	August 24, 2017	Haleakala	Pan-STARRS 1	ELF	2.2 km	MPC · JPL
789547	2017 SU_{51}	—	September 25, 2012	Mount Lemmon	Mount Lemmon Survey	·	1.5 km	MPC · JPL
789548	2017 SL_{58}	—	November 7, 2012	Mount Lemmon	Mount Lemmon Survey	·	1.9 km	MPC · JPL
789549	2017 SS_{58}	—	March 24, 2015	Haleakala	Pan-STARRS 1	·	2.2 km	MPC · JPL
789550	2017 SW_{58}	—	September 16, 2017	Haleakala	Pan-STARRS 1	·	2.4 km	MPC · JPL
789551	2017 SO_{59}	—	July 18, 2012	Siding Spring	SSS	·	1.6 km	MPC · JPL
789552	2017 SR_{62}	—	August 22, 2017	Haleakala	Pan-STARRS 1	·	2.2 km	MPC · JPL
789553	2017 SW_{63}	—	October 7, 2004	Kitt Peak	Spacewatch	·	1.2 km	MPC · JPL
789554	2017 SD_{64}	—	October 18, 2012	Haleakala	Pan-STARRS 1	THM	1.8 km	MPC · JPL
789555	2017 ST_{65}	—	October 9, 2012	Mount Lemmon	Mount Lemmon Survey	EOS	1.3 km	MPC · JPL
789556	2017 SA_{66}	—	February 28, 2009	Mount Lemmon	Mount Lemmon Survey	EOS	1.3 km	MPC · JPL
789557	2017 SM_{66}	—	September 28, 2006	Mount Lemmon	Mount Lemmon Survey	THB	2.0 km	MPC · JPL
789558	2017 SS_{66}	—	January 31, 2009	Kitt Peak	Spacewatch	·	1.9 km	MPC · JPL
789559	2017 SU_{75}	—	August 20, 2017	Haleakala	Pan-STARRS 1	·	2.2 km	MPC · JPL
789560	2017 SO_{76}	—	June 5, 2016	Haleakala	Pan-STARRS 1	·	1.6 km	MPC · JPL
789561	2017 ST_{76}	—	October 2, 2006	Mount Lemmon	Mount Lemmon Survey	·	2.1 km	MPC · JPL
789562	2017 SN_{77}	—	December 29, 2005	Mount Lemmon	Mount Lemmon Survey	(5)	940 m	MPC · JPL
789563	2017 SZ_{86}	—	August 31, 2017	Haleakala	Pan-STARRS 1	HOF	1.8 km	MPC · JPL
789564	2017 SG_{91}	—	August 31, 2017	Haleakala	Pan-STARRS 1	·	2.2 km	MPC · JPL
789565	2017 SU_{94}	—	October 21, 2012	Kitt Peak	Spacewatch	EOS	1.4 km	MPC · JPL
789566	2017 SV_{101}	—	August 24, 2017	Haleakala	Pan-STARRS 1	·	1.1 km	MPC · JPL
789567	2017 SH_{104}	—	September 11, 2007	Mount Lemmon	Mount Lemmon Survey	KOR	1.3 km	MPC · JPL
789568	2017 SC_{107}	—	September 10, 2007	Kitt Peak	Spacewatch	·	2.0 km	MPC · JPL
789569	2017 SQ_{107}	—	September 21, 2017	Haleakala	Pan-STARRS 1	·	1.4 km	MPC · JPL
789570	2017 SM_{108}	—	September 21, 2017	Haleakala	Pan-STARRS 1	EOS	1.4 km	MPC · JPL
789571	2017 SS_{108}	—	February 9, 2008	Kitt Peak	Spacewatch	·	2.2 km	MPC · JPL
789572	2017 SY_{109}	—	August 31, 2017	Haleakala	Pan-STARRS 1	·	1.5 km	MPC · JPL
789573	2017 SK_{119}	—	August 31, 2017	Haleakala	Pan-STARRS 1	·	580 m	MPC · JPL
789574	2017 SJ_{120}	—	November 12, 2012	Mount Lemmon	Mount Lemmon Survey	THM	1.4 km	MPC · JPL
789575	2017 SS_{128}	—	July 30, 2017	Haleakala	Pan-STARRS 1	·	1.2 km	MPC · JPL
789576	2017 SH_{132}	—	April 19, 2015	Mount Lemmon	Mount Lemmon Survey	·	2.2 km	MPC · JPL
789577	2017 SO_{132}	—	September 18, 2017	Haleakala	Pan-STARRS 1	TIR	2.3 km	MPC · JPL
789578	2017 SF_{133}	—	September 30, 2017	Haleakala	Pan-STARRS 1	·	2.3 km	MPC · JPL
789579	2017 SJ_{133}	—	May 20, 2015	Cerro Tololo	DECam	·	2.0 km	MPC · JPL
789580	2017 SU_{133}	—	September 23, 2017	Haleakala	Pan-STARRS 1	·	2.2 km	MPC · JPL
789581	2017 SZ_{133}	—	September 17, 2017	Haleakala	Pan-STARRS 1	TIR	2.6 km	MPC · JPL
789582	2017 SS_{134}	—	October 29, 2006	Kitt Peak	Spacewatch	·	2.0 km	MPC · JPL
789583	2017 SF_{137}	—	September 22, 2017	Haleakala	Pan-STARRS 1	·	2.7 km	MPC · JPL
789584	2017 SX_{151}	—	September 30, 2017	Mount Lemmon	Mount Lemmon Survey	·	2.4 km	MPC · JPL
789585	2017 SQ_{161}	—	August 31, 2017	Haleakala	Pan-STARRS 1	·	2.3 km	MPC · JPL
789586	2017 SQ_{164}	—	September 23, 2017	Haleakala	Pan-STARRS 1	·	2.3 km	MPC · JPL
789587	2017 SP_{165}	—	September 24, 2017	Haleakala	Pan-STARRS 1	·	2.1 km	MPC · JPL
789588	2017 SA_{166}	—	July 7, 2005	Mauna Kea	Veillet, C.	THM	1.5 km	MPC · JPL
789589	2017 ST_{172}	—	April 18, 2015	Cerro Tololo	DECam	·	2.3 km	MPC · JPL
789590	2017 SS_{174}	—	September 19, 2001	Socorro	LINEAR	·	1.7 km	MPC · JPL
789591	2017 SX_{174}	—	October 13, 2006	Kitt Peak	Spacewatch	·	2.1 km	MPC · JPL
789592	2017 SN_{180}	—	August 24, 2017	Haleakala	Pan-STARRS 1	·	1.9 km	MPC · JPL
789593	2017 SA_{181}	—	February 1, 2009	Kitt Peak	Spacewatch	·	1.9 km	MPC · JPL
789594	2017 SK_{190}	—	September 24, 2017	Haleakala	Pan-STARRS 1	·	2.7 km	MPC · JPL
789595	2017 SH_{192}	—	September 17, 2006	Kitt Peak	Spacewatch	EMA	2.4 km	MPC · JPL
789596	2017 SU_{194}	—	September 24, 2017	Mount Lemmon	Mount Lemmon Survey	·	2.4 km	MPC · JPL
789597	2017 SK_{196}	—	September 16, 2017	Haleakala	Pan-STARRS 1	·	2.1 km	MPC · JPL
789598	2017 SU_{196}	—	September 16, 2017	Haleakala	Pan-STARRS 1	·	1.8 km	MPC · JPL
789599	2017 SV_{196}	—	September 26, 2017	Haleakala	Pan-STARRS 1	·	1.4 km	MPC · JPL
789600	2017 SE_{197}	—	September 26, 2017	Haleakala	Pan-STARRS 1	615	940 m	MPC · JPL

== 789601–789700 ==
back to top

Designation			Discovery			Properties		Ref
Permanent	Provisional	Named after	Date	Site	Discoverer(s)	Category	Diam.	Ref
789601	2017 SF_{197}	—	September 26, 2003	Apache Point	SDSS	·	1.3 km	MPC · JPL
789602	2017 SZ_{197}	—	September 23, 2017	Haleakala	Pan-STARRS 1	·	1.5 km	MPC · JPL
789603	2017 SP_{198}	—	September 24, 2017	Mount Lemmon	Mount Lemmon Survey	·	2.4 km	MPC · JPL
789604	2017 SZ_{198}	—	May 7, 2016	Haleakala	Pan-STARRS 1	·	1.0 km	MPC · JPL
789605	2017 SP_{199}	—	April 18, 2015	Cerro Tololo	DECam	·	2.3 km	MPC · JPL
789606	2017 SR_{199}	—	September 18, 2017	Haleakala	Pan-STARRS 1	·	1.8 km	MPC · JPL
789607	2017 SY_{199}	—	September 29, 2017	Haleakala	Pan-STARRS 1	·	2.4 km	MPC · JPL
789608	2017 SD_{200}	—	September 26, 2017	Haleakala	Pan-STARRS 1	AGN	870 m	MPC · JPL
789609	2017 SF_{200}	—	September 23, 2017	Haleakala	Pan-STARRS 1	EOS	1.4 km	MPC · JPL
789610	2017 ST_{200}	—	September 29, 2017	Haleakala	Pan-STARRS 1	EOS	1.1 km	MPC · JPL
789611	2017 SB_{201}	—	September 26, 2017	Haleakala	Pan-STARRS 1	·	1.3 km	MPC · JPL
789612	2017 SE_{201}	—	September 30, 2017	Haleakala	Pan-STARRS 1	·	1.5 km	MPC · JPL
789613	2017 SP_{201}	—	September 23, 2017	Haleakala	Pan-STARRS 1	MAR	610 m	MPC · JPL
789614	2017 SS_{201}	—	September 16, 2017	Haleakala	Pan-STARRS 1	EOS	1.5 km	MPC · JPL
789615	2017 SY_{201}	—	September 24, 2017	Mount Lemmon	Mount Lemmon Survey	·	2.3 km	MPC · JPL
789616	2017 SZ_{201}	—	September 21, 2017	Haleakala	Pan-STARRS 1	·	1.5 km	MPC · JPL
789617	2017 SL_{202}	—	September 22, 2017	Haleakala	Pan-STARRS 1	EUN	830 m	MPC · JPL
789618	2017 SZ_{202}	—	September 27, 2017	Mount Lemmon	Mount Lemmon Survey	·	1.3 km	MPC · JPL
789619	2017 SA_{204}	—	September 19, 2017	Haleakala	Pan-STARRS 1	·	1.9 km	MPC · JPL
789620	2017 SF_{204}	—	September 19, 2017	Haleakala	Pan-STARRS 1	·	2.2 km	MPC · JPL
789621	2017 SQ_{204}	—	April 21, 2015	Cerro Tololo	DECam	KOR	850 m	MPC · JPL
789622	2017 SU_{204}	—	September 23, 2017	Haleakala	Pan-STARRS 1	·	1.2 km	MPC · JPL
789623	2017 SS_{206}	—	September 22, 2017	Haleakala	Pan-STARRS 1	·	2.4 km	MPC · JPL
789624	2017 ST_{206}	—	September 21, 2011	Mount Lemmon	Mount Lemmon Survey	·	1.8 km	MPC · JPL
789625	2017 SX_{206}	—	September 30, 2017	Haleakala	Pan-STARRS 1	·	2.3 km	MPC · JPL
789626	2017 SZ_{206}	—	September 24, 2017	Mount Lemmon	Mount Lemmon Survey	VER	2.2 km	MPC · JPL
789627	2017 SA_{207}	—	September 24, 2017	Haleakala	Pan-STARRS 1	(1118)	2.3 km	MPC · JPL
789628	2017 SX_{208}	—	September 19, 2017	Haleakala	Pan-STARRS 1	·	2.1 km	MPC · JPL
789629	2017 SR_{210}	—	April 19, 2015	Cerro Tololo	DECam	·	2.5 km	MPC · JPL
789630	2017 SA_{219}	—	May 21, 2015	Cerro Tololo	DECam	EOS	1.2 km	MPC · JPL
789631	2017 SR_{219}	—	September 26, 2017	Haleakala	Pan-STARRS 1	KOR	1.2 km	MPC · JPL
789632	2017 SA_{221}	—	May 20, 2015	Cerro Tololo	DECam	·	2.2 km	MPC · JPL
789633	2017 SX_{224}	—	September 17, 2017	Haleakala	Pan-STARRS 1	·	2.0 km	MPC · JPL
789634	2017 SE_{225}	—	October 11, 2006	Sacramento Peak	SDSS Collaboration	·	2.1 km	MPC · JPL
789635	2017 SK_{226}	—	May 20, 2015	Cerro Tololo	DECam	LIX	2.2 km	MPC · JPL
789636	2017 SF_{234}	—	September 16, 2017	Haleakala	Pan-STARRS 1	·	2.0 km	MPC · JPL
789637	2017 SG_{234}	—	September 16, 2017	Haleakala	Pan-STARRS 1	·	2.5 km	MPC · JPL
789638	2017 SH_{234}	—	September 16, 2017	Haleakala	Pan-STARRS 1	VER	1.8 km	MPC · JPL
789639	2017 SW_{234}	—	September 25, 2017	Haleakala	Pan-STARRS 1	EOS	1.2 km	MPC · JPL
789640	2017 SX_{234}	—	January 23, 2015	Haleakala	Pan-STARRS 1	·	1.2 km	MPC · JPL
789641	2017 SF_{238}	—	September 22, 2017	Haleakala	Pan-STARRS 1	VER	1.9 km	MPC · JPL
789642	2017 SU_{239}	—	September 19, 2017	Haleakala	Pan-STARRS 1	AGN	810 m	MPC · JPL
789643	2017 SX_{239}	—	September 21, 2017	Haleakala	Pan-STARRS 1	·	2.4 km	MPC · JPL
789644	2017 SH_{242}	—	September 16, 2017	Haleakala	Pan-STARRS 1	·	3.0 km	MPC · JPL
789645	2017 SO_{242}	—	September 25, 2017	Haleakala	Pan-STARRS 1	·	2.0 km	MPC · JPL
789646	2017 SK_{247}	—	September 21, 2017	Haleakala	Pan-STARRS 1	EOS	1.5 km	MPC · JPL
789647	2017 SP_{247}	—	September 19, 2017	Haleakala	Pan-STARRS 1	ELF	2.5 km	MPC · JPL
789648	2017 SK_{248}	—	September 24, 2017	Haleakala	Pan-STARRS 1	·	2.3 km	MPC · JPL
789649	2017 SN_{248}	—	September 21, 2017	Haleakala	Pan-STARRS 1	EOS	1.4 km	MPC · JPL
789650	2017 SV_{249}	—	September 17, 2017	Haleakala	Pan-STARRS 1	EOS	1.4 km	MPC · JPL
789651	2017 SY_{249}	—	September 17, 2017	Haleakala	Pan-STARRS 1	·	2.6 km	MPC · JPL
789652	2017 SB_{250}	—	August 1, 2017	Haleakala	Pan-STARRS 1	·	2.2 km	MPC · JPL
789653	2017 SD_{250}	—	September 17, 2017	Haleakala	Pan-STARRS 1	EOS	1.4 km	MPC · JPL
789654	2017 SN_{250}	—	February 25, 2015	Haleakala	Pan-STARRS 1	·	2.2 km	MPC · JPL
789655	2017 SP_{250}	—	September 23, 2017	Haleakala	Pan-STARRS 1	·	1.8 km	MPC · JPL
789656	2017 SM_{251}	—	September 21, 2017	Haleakala	Pan-STARRS 1	·	1.9 km	MPC · JPL
789657	2017 SC_{253}	—	September 19, 2017	Haleakala	Pan-STARRS 1	·	1.9 km	MPC · JPL
789658	2017 SJ_{253}	—	September 18, 2017	Haleakala	Pan-STARRS 1	·	2.1 km	MPC · JPL
789659	2017 SJ_{254}	—	September 26, 2017	Mount Lemmon	Mount Lemmon Survey	·	2.4 km	MPC · JPL
789660	2017 SY_{254}	—	September 23, 2017	Haleakala	Pan-STARRS 1	(260)	2.5 km	MPC · JPL
789661	2017 SL_{256}	—	September 30, 2017	Haleakala	Pan-STARRS 1	·	1.7 km	MPC · JPL
789662	2017 SN_{256}	—	August 29, 2011	Siding Spring	SSS	·	2.4 km	MPC · JPL
789663	2017 SP_{256}	—	September 17, 2017	Haleakala	Pan-STARRS 1	WIT	720 m	MPC · JPL
789664	2017 SJ_{257}	—	September 25, 2017	Haleakala	Pan-STARRS 1	·	2.1 km	MPC · JPL
789665	2017 SQ_{257}	—	September 16, 2017	Haleakala	Pan-STARRS 1	·	1.8 km	MPC · JPL
789666	2017 SY_{257}	—	September 20, 2011	Haleakala	Pan-STARRS 1	·	1.9 km	MPC · JPL
789667	2017 SZ_{257}	—	September 24, 2017	Haleakala	Pan-STARRS 1	·	2.0 km	MPC · JPL
789668	2017 SB_{258}	—	September 25, 2017	Haleakala	Pan-STARRS 1	·	2.0 km	MPC · JPL
789669	2017 SD_{258}	—	September 22, 2017	Haleakala	Pan-STARRS 1	·	1.9 km	MPC · JPL
789670	2017 SV_{258}	—	April 18, 2015	Cerro Tololo	DECam	KOR	890 m	MPC · JPL
789671	2017 SX_{258}	—	September 23, 2017	Haleakala	Pan-STARRS 1	·	1.7 km	MPC · JPL
789672	2017 SS_{259}	—	September 26, 2017	Mount Lemmon	Mount Lemmon Survey	·	1.9 km	MPC · JPL
789673	2017 SU_{259}	—	September 25, 2017	Haleakala	Pan-STARRS 1	·	2.1 km	MPC · JPL
789674	2017 SA_{260}	—	April 18, 2015	Cerro Tololo	DECam	·	2.3 km	MPC · JPL
789675	2017 SB_{260}	—	October 8, 2012	Haleakala	Pan-STARRS 1	·	1.7 km	MPC · JPL
789676	2017 SL_{260}	—	September 17, 2017	Haleakala	Pan-STARRS 1	KOR	920 m	MPC · JPL
789677	2017 SM_{261}	—	September 26, 2017	Haleakala	Pan-STARRS 1	·	1.3 km	MPC · JPL
789678	2017 SN_{262}	—	September 25, 2017	Haleakala	Pan-STARRS 1	·	1.3 km	MPC · JPL
789679	2017 SX_{273}	—	September 19, 2017	Haleakala	Pan-STARRS 1	·	830 m	MPC · JPL
789680	2017 SL_{278}	—	April 9, 2015	Mount Lemmon	Mount Lemmon Survey	·	1.6 km	MPC · JPL
789681	2017 SX_{283}	—	September 16, 2017	Haleakala	Pan-STARRS 1	·	1.6 km	MPC · JPL
789682	2017 SQ_{289}	—	April 18, 2015	Cerro Tololo	DECam	VER	1.8 km	MPC · JPL
789683	2017 SD_{290}	—	April 19, 2015	Cerro Tololo	DECam	·	1.2 km	MPC · JPL
789684	2017 SO_{293}	—	September 16, 2017	Haleakala	Pan-STARRS 1	·	2.1 km	MPC · JPL
789685	2017 SF_{294}	—	September 29, 2017	Haleakala	Pan-STARRS 1	·	2.3 km	MPC · JPL
789686	2017 SK_{294}	—	March 21, 2015	Haleakala	Pan-STARRS 1	(5)	790 m	MPC · JPL
789687	2017 SA_{295}	—	September 19, 2017	Haleakala	Pan-STARRS 1	·	2.0 km	MPC · JPL
789688	2017 SO_{297}	—	September 23, 2017	Haleakala	Pan-STARRS 1	VER	1.7 km	MPC · JPL
789689	2017 SB_{299}	—	September 17, 2017	Haleakala	Pan-STARRS 1	·	1.8 km	MPC · JPL
789690	2017 SN_{302}	—	April 18, 2015	Cerro Tololo	DECam	EOS	1.3 km	MPC · JPL
789691	2017 SQ_{302}	—	May 19, 2015	Cerro Tololo	DECam	VER	1.7 km	MPC · JPL
789692	2017 SV_{303}	—	September 21, 2017	Haleakala	Pan-STARRS 1	·	1.8 km	MPC · JPL
789693	2017 SR_{305}	—	May 21, 2015	Cerro Tololo	DECam	·	1.9 km	MPC · JPL
789694	2017 SF_{306}	—	September 25, 2017	Haleakala	Pan-STARRS 1	·	1.8 km	MPC · JPL
789695	2017 SJ_{313}	—	March 15, 2016	Haleakala	Pan-STARRS 1	DOR	1.7 km	MPC · JPL
789696	2017 SJ_{314}	—	September 26, 2017	Haleakala	Pan-STARRS 1	·	1.9 km	MPC · JPL
789697	2017 ST_{316}	—	September 24, 2017	Mount Lemmon	Mount Lemmon Survey	·	2.4 km	MPC · JPL
789698	2017 SV_{317}	—	April 18, 2015	Cerro Tololo	DECam	·	2.0 km	MPC · JPL
789699	2017 SW_{318}	—	November 15, 2006	Mount Lemmon	Mount Lemmon Survey	·	2.3 km	MPC · JPL
789700	2017 SA_{319}	—	September 25, 2017	Haleakala	Pan-STARRS 1	·	1.4 km	MPC · JPL

== 789701–789800 ==
back to top

Designation			Discovery			Properties		Ref
Permanent	Provisional	Named after	Date	Site	Discoverer(s)	Category	Diam.	Ref
789701	2017 SM_{322}	—	November 13, 2012	Mount Lemmon	Mount Lemmon Survey	·	1.8 km	MPC · JPL
789702	2017 SU_{324}	—	August 31, 2017	Mount Lemmon	Mount Lemmon Survey	·	2.0 km	MPC · JPL
789703	2017 SW_{324}	—	September 25, 2017	Haleakala	Pan-STARRS 1	·	2.6 km	MPC · JPL
789704	2017 SG_{326}	—	January 2, 2009	Kitt Peak	Spacewatch	·	1.8 km	MPC · JPL
789705	2017 SO_{326}	—	September 16, 2017	Haleakala	Pan-STARRS 1	·	2.2 km	MPC · JPL
789706	2017 SN_{327}	—	September 21, 2017	Haleakala	Pan-STARRS 1	·	2.2 km	MPC · JPL
789707	2017 SX_{327}	—	September 22, 2017	Haleakala	Pan-STARRS 1	ELF	2.2 km	MPC · JPL
789708	2017 SE_{329}	—	September 26, 2006	Kitt Peak	Spacewatch	·	1.9 km	MPC · JPL
789709	2017 SN_{330}	—	September 30, 2017	Mount Lemmon	Mount Lemmon Survey	·	2.3 km	MPC · JPL
789710	2017 SQ_{330}	—	September 24, 2017	Mount Lemmon	Mount Lemmon Survey	·	1.7 km	MPC · JPL
789711	2017 SA_{332}	—	January 22, 2015	Haleakala	Pan-STARRS 1	EOS	1.4 km	MPC · JPL
789712	2017 SG_{332}	—	September 23, 2017	Haleakala	Pan-STARRS 1	·	2.0 km	MPC · JPL
789713	2017 SF_{335}	—	September 24, 2017	Haleakala	Pan-STARRS 1	·	2.2 km	MPC · JPL
789714	2017 SF_{336}	—	September 24, 2017	Haleakala	Pan-STARRS 1	·	1.5 km	MPC · JPL
789715	2017 SV_{337}	—	February 26, 2009	Kitt Peak	Spacewatch	·	1.3 km	MPC · JPL
789716	2017 SZ_{337}	—	September 24, 2017	Haleakala	Pan-STARRS 1	AGN	740 m	MPC · JPL
789717	2017 SU_{340}	—	September 23, 2017	Haleakala	Pan-STARRS 1	KOR	1 km	MPC · JPL
789718	2017 SD_{342}	—	September 25, 2017	Haleakala	Pan-STARRS 1	·	2.0 km	MPC · JPL
789719	2017 SH_{346}	—	September 17, 2017	Haleakala	Pan-STARRS 1	·	2.4 km	MPC · JPL
789720	2017 SK_{347}	—	February 24, 2014	Haleakala	Pan-STARRS 1	·	2.4 km	MPC · JPL
789721	2017 SC_{348}	—	September 17, 2017	Haleakala	Pan-STARRS 1	·	2.1 km	MPC · JPL
789722	2017 SS_{362}	—	September 26, 2017	Haleakala	Pan-STARRS 1	·	2.0 km	MPC · JPL
789723	2017 SH_{363}	—	September 17, 2017	Haleakala	Pan-STARRS 1	·	2.0 km	MPC · JPL
789724	2017 SN_{363}	—	October 21, 2006	Mount Lemmon	Mount Lemmon Survey	·	2.4 km	MPC · JPL
789725	2017 SQ_{363}	—	September 16, 2017	Haleakala	Pan-STARRS 1	EOS	1.3 km	MPC · JPL
789726	2017 SG_{364}	—	September 16, 2017	Haleakala	Pan-STARRS 1	·	2.3 km	MPC · JPL
789727	2017 SV_{364}	—	September 25, 2017	Haleakala	Pan-STARRS 1	·	1.8 km	MPC · JPL
789728	2017 SO_{365}	—	October 20, 2012	Haleakala	Pan-STARRS 1	·	1.8 km	MPC · JPL
789729	2017 SQ_{365}	—	September 25, 2017	Haleakala	Pan-STARRS 1	·	2.1 km	MPC · JPL
789730	2017 SD_{366}	—	September 17, 2017	Haleakala	Pan-STARRS 1	·	2.0 km	MPC · JPL
789731	2017 SK_{366}	—	September 29, 2017	Haleakala	Pan-STARRS 1	·	1.9 km	MPC · JPL
789732	2017 SQ_{366}	—	September 24, 2017	Haleakala	Pan-STARRS 1	ELF	2.2 km	MPC · JPL
789733	2017 ST_{368}	—	February 4, 2009	Mount Lemmon	Mount Lemmon Survey	·	1.3 km	MPC · JPL
789734	2017 SM_{369}	—	October 21, 2007	Mount Lemmon	Mount Lemmon Survey	·	1.8 km	MPC · JPL
789735	2017 SQ_{369}	—	October 12, 2007	Mount Lemmon	Mount Lemmon Survey	·	1.2 km	MPC · JPL
789736	2017 SF_{371}	—	September 17, 2017	Haleakala	Pan-STARRS 1	·	2.1 km	MPC · JPL
789737	2017 SK_{374}	—	September 19, 2017	Haleakala	Pan-STARRS 1	VER	1.7 km	MPC · JPL
789738	2017 SN_{396}	—	September 27, 2017	Mount Lemmon	Mount Lemmon Survey	·	1.5 km	MPC · JPL
789739	2017 TA_{1}	—	January 13, 2011	Kitt Peak	Spacewatch	·	790 m	MPC · JPL
789740	2017 TC_{15}	—	September 22, 2017	Haleakala	Pan-STARRS 1	TIR	2.3 km	MPC · JPL
789741	2017 TP_{15}	—	October 1, 2017	Haleakala	Pan-STARRS 1	·	2.0 km	MPC · JPL
789742	2017 TL_{21}	—	October 13, 2017	Mount Lemmon	Mount Lemmon Survey	·	2.5 km	MPC · JPL
789743	2017 TM_{21}	—	October 15, 2017	Mount Lemmon	Mount Lemmon Survey	·	2.4 km	MPC · JPL
789744	2017 TC_{23}	—	April 29, 2014	Cerro Tololo	DECam	TIR	2.1 km	MPC · JPL
789745	2017 TV_{23}	—	October 11, 2017	Haleakala	Pan-STARRS 1	·	2.3 km	MPC · JPL
789746	2017 TH_{24}	—	October 15, 2017	Mount Lemmon	Mount Lemmon Survey	·	1.1 km	MPC · JPL
789747	2017 TO_{24}	—	October 12, 2017	Mount Lemmon	Mount Lemmon Survey	·	2.3 km	MPC · JPL
789748	2017 TQ_{24}	—	May 20, 2015	Cerro Tololo	DECam	·	2.7 km	MPC · JPL
789749	2017 TL_{25}	—	October 13, 2017	Mount Lemmon	Mount Lemmon Survey	·	2.1 km	MPC · JPL
789750	2017 TD_{26}	—	October 12, 2017	Mount Lemmon	Mount Lemmon Survey	·	1.6 km	MPC · JPL
789751	2017 TM_{26}	—	September 26, 2017	Haleakala	Pan-STARRS 1	AGN	1.1 km	MPC · JPL
789752	2017 TS_{26}	—	October 14, 2017	Cerro Paranal	Gaia Ground Based Optical Tracking	HOF	1.9 km	MPC · JPL
789753	2017 TU_{26}	—	October 14, 2017	Mount Lemmon	Mount Lemmon Survey	·	1.8 km	MPC · JPL
789754	2017 TF_{27}	—	September 19, 2017	Haleakala	Pan-STARRS 1	·	1.6 km	MPC · JPL
789755	2017 TL_{27}	—	October 1, 2017	Haleakala	Pan-STARRS 1	EOS	1.4 km	MPC · JPL
789756	2017 TA_{28}	—	April 18, 2015	Cerro Tololo	DECam	AGN	780 m	MPC · JPL
789757	2017 TL_{30}	—	October 15, 2017	Mount Lemmon	Mount Lemmon Survey	AGN	850 m	MPC · JPL
789758	2017 TO_{30}	—	September 15, 2017	Haleakala	Pan-STARRS 1	·	1.6 km	MPC · JPL
789759	2017 TL_{33}	—	September 17, 2017	Haleakala	Pan-STARRS 1	·	2.0 km	MPC · JPL
789760	2017 TR_{34}	—	April 18, 2015	Cerro Tololo	DECam	·	1.4 km	MPC · JPL
789761	2017 TV_{35}	—	October 10, 2017	Haleakala	Pan-STARRS 1	·	2.1 km	MPC · JPL
789762	2017 TD_{36}	—	October 11, 2017	Haleakala	Pan-STARRS 1	(260)	2.6 km	MPC · JPL
789763	2017 TW_{36}	—	October 14, 2017	Mount Lemmon	Mount Lemmon Survey	·	2.1 km	MPC · JPL
789764	2017 TW_{37}	—	October 15, 2017	Mount Lemmon	Mount Lemmon Survey	·	1.9 km	MPC · JPL
789765	2017 TN_{38}	—	October 9, 2017	Cerro Paranal	Altmann, M., Prusti, T.	WIT	660 m	MPC · JPL
789766	2017 TB_{45}	—	April 18, 2015	Cerro Tololo	DECam	·	2.0 km	MPC · JPL
789767	2017 TG_{45}	—	October 1, 2017	Mount Lemmon	Mount Lemmon Survey	·	2.4 km	MPC · JPL
789768	2017 TJ_{47}	—	October 1, 2017	Haleakala	Pan-STARRS 1	·	2.6 km	MPC · JPL
789769	2017 TR_{48}	—	October 14, 2017	Mount Lemmon	Mount Lemmon Survey	·	2.2 km	MPC · JPL
789770	2017 TA_{53}	—	October 15, 2017	Mount Lemmon	Mount Lemmon Survey	·	1.8 km	MPC · JPL
789771	2017 UO_{15}	—	October 6, 2012	Kitt Peak	Spacewatch	·	2.3 km	MPC · JPL
789772	2017 UC_{16}	—	October 16, 2006	Kitt Peak	Spacewatch	THM	1.5 km	MPC · JPL
789773	2017 UZ_{21}	—	September 15, 2017	Haleakala	Pan-STARRS 1	DOR	1.8 km	MPC · JPL
789774	2017 UC_{27}	—	July 30, 2017	Haleakala	Pan-STARRS 1	·	1.7 km	MPC · JPL
789775	2017 UZ_{28}	—	August 27, 2006	Kitt Peak	Spacewatch	·	1.7 km	MPC · JPL
789776	2017 UZ_{45}	—	August 3, 2017	Haleakala	Pan-STARRS 1	·	2.0 km	MPC · JPL
789777	2017 UC_{48}	—	October 28, 2017	Haleakala	Pan-STARRS 1	·	2.1 km	MPC · JPL
789778	2017 UR_{53}	—	October 29, 2017	Haleakala	Pan-STARRS 1	·	2.2 km	MPC · JPL
789779	2017 UC_{54}	—	October 24, 2017	Mount Lemmon	Mount Lemmon Survey	·	1.9 km	MPC · JPL
789780	2017 UJ_{58}	—	October 19, 2017	Haleakala	Pan-STARRS 1	·	1.6 km	MPC · JPL
789781	2017 UK_{69}	—	January 5, 2013	Kitt Peak	Spacewatch	·	2.3 km	MPC · JPL
789782	2017 US_{85}	—	December 23, 2012	Haleakala	Pan-STARRS 1	·	2.1 km	MPC · JPL
789783	2017 UT_{86}	—	October 28, 2017	Mount Lemmon	Mount Lemmon Survey	·	2.4 km	MPC · JPL
789784	2017 UR_{89}	—	October 27, 2017	Mount Lemmon	Mount Lemmon Survey	URS	2.3 km	MPC · JPL
789785	2017 UL_{92}	—	September 14, 2017	Haleakala	Pan-STARRS 1	EOS	1.4 km	MPC · JPL
789786	2017 UO_{93}	—	October 18, 2017	Haleakala	Pan-STARRS 1	EOS	1.4 km	MPC · JPL
789787	2017 UQ_{93}	—	October 21, 2017	Mount Lemmon	Mount Lemmon Survey	·	1.8 km	MPC · JPL
789788	2017 UH_{94}	—	October 28, 2017	Haleakala	Pan-STARRS 1	·	1.7 km	MPC · JPL
789789	2017 UO_{94}	—	April 18, 2015	Cerro Tololo	DECam	·	1.5 km	MPC · JPL
789790	2017 UP_{94}	—	October 27, 2017	Haleakala	Pan-STARRS 1	EOS	1.3 km	MPC · JPL
789791	2017 UU_{94}	—	October 17, 2017	Mount Lemmon	Mount Lemmon Survey	·	2.2 km	MPC · JPL
789792	2017 UG_{96}	—	October 21, 2017	Mount Lemmon	Mount Lemmon Survey	EOS	1.2 km	MPC · JPL
789793	2017 UD_{97}	—	October 29, 2017	Haleakala	Pan-STARRS 1	·	2.3 km	MPC · JPL
789794	2017 UE_{98}	—	October 21, 2017	Mount Lemmon	Mount Lemmon Survey	·	2.7 km	MPC · JPL
789795	2017 UO_{98}	—	October 21, 2017	Mount Lemmon	Mount Lemmon Survey	MRX	770 m	MPC · JPL
789796	2017 UT_{99}	—	April 20, 2015	Haleakala	Pan-STARRS 1	·	1.8 km	MPC · JPL
789797	2017 UU_{99}	—	April 17, 2015	Mount Lemmon	Mount Lemmon Survey	·	2.1 km	MPC · JPL
789798	2017 UG_{100}	—	October 21, 2017	Mount Lemmon	Mount Lemmon Survey	·	1.4 km	MPC · JPL
789799	2017 UM_{100}	—	October 28, 2017	Haleakala	Pan-STARRS 1	·	1.8 km	MPC · JPL
789800	2017 UG_{102}	—	October 28, 2017	Haleakala	Pan-STARRS 1	VER	1.8 km	MPC · JPL

== 789801–789900 ==
back to top

Designation			Discovery			Properties		Ref
Permanent	Provisional	Named after	Date	Site	Discoverer(s)	Category	Diam.	Ref
789801	2017 UH_{102}	—	October 28, 2017	Haleakala	Pan-STARRS 1	·	2.4 km	MPC · JPL
789802	2017 UU_{102}	—	April 18, 2015	Cerro Tololo	DECam	·	1.4 km	MPC · JPL
789803	2017 UY_{102}	—	October 23, 2012	Mount Lemmon	Mount Lemmon Survey	·	1.5 km	MPC · JPL
789804	2017 UA_{103}	—	April 18, 2015	Cerro Tololo	DECam	·	1.5 km	MPC · JPL
789805	2017 UB_{103}	—	October 28, 2017	Haleakala	Pan-STARRS 1	EOS	1.3 km	MPC · JPL
789806	2017 UE_{104}	—	October 27, 2017	Haleakala	Pan-STARRS 1	·	740 m	MPC · JPL
789807	2017 UL_{105}	—	October 28, 2017	Haleakala	Pan-STARRS 1	·	1.9 km	MPC · JPL
789808	2017 UO_{105}	—	October 27, 2017	Haleakala	Pan-STARRS 1	·	2.6 km	MPC · JPL
789809	2017 US_{105}	—	October 23, 2017	Mount Lemmon	Mount Lemmon Survey	MRX	830 m	MPC · JPL
789810	2017 UV_{107}	—	October 30, 2017	Haleakala	Pan-STARRS 1	·	2.8 km	MPC · JPL
789811	2017 UC_{108}	—	October 28, 2017	Haleakala	Pan-STARRS 1	·	1.5 km	MPC · JPL
789812	2017 UV_{109}	—	April 28, 2014	Cerro Tololo	DECam	LUT	2.5 km	MPC · JPL
789813	2017 UW_{109}	—	October 29, 2017	Haleakala	Pan-STARRS 1	THB	2.4 km	MPC · JPL
789814	2017 UX_{113}	—	October 29, 2017	Haleakala	Pan-STARRS 1	·	2.2 km	MPC · JPL
789815	2017 UZ_{117}	—	October 28, 2017	Haleakala	Pan-STARRS 1	·	1.6 km	MPC · JPL
789816	2017 UZ_{119}	—	October 27, 2017	Haleakala	Pan-STARRS 1	·	2.4 km	MPC · JPL
789817	2017 UD_{122}	—	October 25, 2017	Mount Lemmon	Mount Lemmon Survey	·	2.6 km	MPC · JPL
789818	2017 UL_{122}	—	October 28, 2017	Haleakala	Pan-STARRS 1	·	1.7 km	MPC · JPL
789819	2017 UF_{123}	—	October 17, 2017	Mount Lemmon	Mount Lemmon Survey	·	2.1 km	MPC · JPL
789820	2017 US_{123}	—	October 28, 2017	Haleakala	Pan-STARRS 1	·	2.1 km	MPC · JPL
789821	2017 UT_{135}	—	October 8, 2012	Mount Lemmon	Mount Lemmon Survey	·	1.5 km	MPC · JPL
789822	2017 UY_{135}	—	October 27, 2017	Mount Lemmon	Mount Lemmon Survey	·	1.9 km	MPC · JPL
789823	2017 UF_{138}	—	October 19, 2003	Apache Point	SDSS	·	1.5 km	MPC · JPL
789824	2017 UZ_{138}	—	October 23, 2017	Mount Lemmon	Mount Lemmon Survey	·	2.3 km	MPC · JPL
789825	2017 UE_{139}	—	October 17, 2017	Mount Lemmon	Mount Lemmon Survey	·	2.1 km	MPC · JPL
789826	2017 UF_{139}	—	October 23, 2017	Mount Lemmon	Mount Lemmon Survey	·	2.4 km	MPC · JPL
789827	2017 UK_{139}	—	May 22, 2015	Haleakala	Pan-STARRS 1	VER	1.8 km	MPC · JPL
789828	2017 UP_{146}	—	October 28, 2017	Haleakala	Pan-STARRS 1	·	1.3 km	MPC · JPL
789829	2017 UH_{158}	—	January 21, 2015	Haleakala	Pan-STARRS 1	·	1.2 km	MPC · JPL
789830	2017 UN_{173}	—	July 5, 2016	Haleakala	Pan-STARRS 1	·	1.9 km	MPC · JPL
789831	2017 UW_{176}	—	October 28, 2017	Haleakala	Pan-STARRS 1	EOS	1.3 km	MPC · JPL
789832	2017 UZ_{178}	—	October 23, 2017	Mount Lemmon	Mount Lemmon Survey	KOR	920 m	MPC · JPL
789833	2017 UE_{180}	—	July 5, 2016	Haleakala	Pan-STARRS 1	·	1.5 km	MPC · JPL
789834	2017 UM_{191}	—	August 30, 2011	Haleakala	Pan-STARRS 1	·	1.6 km	MPC · JPL
789835	2017 UU_{191}	—	July 3, 2016	Mount Lemmon	Mount Lemmon Survey	HYG	2.2 km	MPC · JPL
789836	2017 UO_{192}	—	October 21, 2017	Mount Lemmon	Mount Lemmon Survey	·	2.0 km	MPC · JPL
789837	2017 UW_{193}	—	October 21, 2017	Mount Lemmon	Mount Lemmon Survey	EOS	1.2 km	MPC · JPL
789838	2017 UM_{194}	—	September 20, 2011	Mount Lemmon	Mount Lemmon Survey	·	1.9 km	MPC · JPL
789839	2017 UY_{194}	—	October 22, 2011	Mount Lemmon	Mount Lemmon Survey	VER	2.0 km	MPC · JPL
789840	2017 UJ_{195}	—	October 28, 2017	Haleakala	Pan-STARRS 1	·	2.0 km	MPC · JPL
789841	2017 UH_{212}	—	October 29, 2017	Haleakala	Pan-STARRS 1	·	2.2 km	MPC · JPL
789842	2017 UU_{213}	—	October 28, 2017	Haleakala	Pan-STARRS 1	·	2.5 km	MPC · JPL
789843	2017 UP_{214}	—	October 27, 2017	Mount Lemmon	Mount Lemmon Survey	·	1.9 km	MPC · JPL
789844	2017 UF_{215}	—	October 29, 2017	Haleakala	Pan-STARRS 1	·	2.2 km	MPC · JPL
789845	2017 UG_{219}	—	February 27, 2015	Haleakala	Pan-STARRS 1	·	890 m	MPC · JPL
789846	2017 VF_{4}	—	September 24, 2011	Catalina	CSS	T_{j} (2.99)	3.2 km	MPC · JPL
789847	2017 VO_{9}	—	October 17, 2017	Piszkéstető	K. Sárneczky	·	1.1 km	MPC · JPL
789848	2017 VV_{9}	—	October 31, 2008	Kitt Peak	Spacewatch	·	1.4 km	MPC · JPL
789849	2017 VB_{18}	—	June 13, 2015	Haleakala	Pan-STARRS 1	·	3.1 km	MPC · JPL
789850	2017 VS_{21}	—	November 13, 2017	Haleakala	Pan-STARRS 1	·	2.4 km	MPC · JPL
789851	2017 VF_{22}	—	October 13, 2017	Mount Lemmon	Mount Lemmon Survey	·	1.2 km	MPC · JPL
789852	2017 VS_{22}	—	May 21, 2015	Haleakala	Pan-STARRS 1	·	2.5 km	MPC · JPL
789853	2017 VS_{23}	—	September 24, 2017	Haleakala	Pan-STARRS 1	·	2.3 km	MPC · JPL
789854	2017 VC_{24}	—	September 20, 2011	Haleakala	Pan-STARRS 1	·	1.6 km	MPC · JPL
789855	2017 VF_{24}	—	October 18, 2017	Haleakala	Pan-STARRS 1	HYG	1.8 km	MPC · JPL
789856	2017 VZ_{25}	—	September 20, 2011	Mount Lemmon	Mount Lemmon Survey	·	1.9 km	MPC · JPL
789857	2017 VU_{37}	—	October 24, 2003	Kitt Peak	Spacewatch	·	1.5 km	MPC · JPL
789858	2017 VU_{38}	—	September 23, 2011	Haleakala	Pan-STARRS 1	·	2.2 km	MPC · JPL
789859	2017 VV_{38}	—	November 13, 2017	Haleakala	Pan-STARRS 1	·	1.7 km	MPC · JPL
789860	2017 VG_{41}	—	September 30, 2010	Mount Lemmon	Mount Lemmon Survey	·	2.2 km	MPC · JPL
789861	2017 VN_{41}	—	November 13, 2017	Haleakala	Pan-STARRS 1	·	1.7 km	MPC · JPL
789862	2017 VP_{41}	—	November 15, 2017	Mount Lemmon	Mount Lemmon Survey	VER	1.9 km	MPC · JPL
789863	2017 VX_{41}	—	November 14, 2017	Mount Lemmon	Mount Lemmon Survey	·	950 m	MPC · JPL
789864	2017 VB_{42}	—	May 20, 2015	Cerro Tololo	DECam	KOR	930 m	MPC · JPL
789865	2017 VV_{42}	—	November 15, 2017	Mount Lemmon	Mount Lemmon Survey	EOS	1.3 km	MPC · JPL
789866	2017 VL_{50}	—	November 13, 2017	Haleakala	Pan-STARRS 1	3:2	4.6 km	MPC · JPL
789867	2017 VR_{50}	—	November 15, 2017	Mount Lemmon	Mount Lemmon Survey	·	2.4 km	MPC · JPL
789868	2017 VX_{50}	—	October 27, 2017	Mount Lemmon	Mount Lemmon Survey	·	490 m	MPC · JPL
789869	2017 VR_{53}	—	September 10, 2007	Mount Lemmon	Mount Lemmon Survey	·	1.6 km	MPC · JPL
789870	2017 VW_{53}	—	November 10, 2017	Haleakala	Pan-STARRS 1	·	1.3 km	MPC · JPL
789871	2017 VG_{57}	—	April 19, 2015	Cerro Tololo	DECam	·	1 km	MPC · JPL
789872	2017 VU_{57}	—	November 7, 2017	Haleakala	Pan-STARRS 1	·	1.0 km	MPC · JPL
789873	2017 VD_{58}	—	April 23, 2014	Cerro Tololo	DECam	·	2.2 km	MPC · JPL
789874	2017 VQ_{60}	—	November 15, 2017	Mount Lemmon	Mount Lemmon Survey	·	1.4 km	MPC · JPL
789875	2017 VJ_{67}	—	April 25, 2015	Haleakala	Pan-STARRS 1	NAE	1.5 km	MPC · JPL
789876	2017 VQ_{67}	—	July 12, 2016	Mount Lemmon	Mount Lemmon Survey	·	1.3 km	MPC · JPL
789877	2017 VC_{68}	—	November 10, 2017	Haleakala	Pan-STARRS 1	KOR	1.0 km	MPC · JPL
789878	2017 WX_{2}	—	May 21, 2015	Haleakala	Pan-STARRS 1	·	2.2 km	MPC · JPL
789879	2017 WN_{5}	—	January 17, 2013	Haleakala	Pan-STARRS 1	·	1.9 km	MPC · JPL
789880	2017 WZ_{5}	—	September 28, 2011	Mount Lemmon	Mount Lemmon Survey	·	2.2 km	MPC · JPL
789881	2017 WJ_{8}	—	November 18, 2017	Haleakala	Pan-STARRS 1	ELF	2.4 km	MPC · JPL
789882	2017 WB_{30}	—	October 24, 2013	Haleakala	Pan-STARRS 1	·	1.2 km	MPC · JPL
789883	2017 WQ_{30}	—	November 16, 2017	Mount Lemmon	Mount Lemmon Survey	T_{j} (2.99) · (895)	2.6 km	MPC · JPL
789884	2017 WZ_{34}	—	March 28, 2015	Haleakala	Pan-STARRS 1	·	2.3 km	MPC · JPL
789885	2017 WA_{36}	—	November 22, 2017	Haleakala	Pan-STARRS 1	EUN	930 m	MPC · JPL
789886	2017 WK_{39}	—	May 23, 2014	Haleakala	Pan-STARRS 1	·	1.9 km	MPC · JPL
789887	2017 WC_{44}	—	November 27, 2017	Mount Lemmon	Mount Lemmon Survey	VER	2.1 km	MPC · JPL
789888	2017 WN_{44}	—	November 21, 2017	Haleakala	Pan-STARRS 1	·	2.5 km	MPC · JPL
789889	2017 WS_{44}	—	November 25, 2017	Mount Lemmon	Mount Lemmon Survey	·	1.9 km	MPC · JPL
789890	2017 WZ_{44}	—	November 16, 2017	Mount Lemmon	Mount Lemmon Survey	·	1.4 km	MPC · JPL
789891	2017 WK_{46}	—	November 21, 2017	Haleakala	Pan-STARRS 1	·	1.9 km	MPC · JPL
789892	2017 WO_{46}	—	November 18, 2017	Haleakala	Pan-STARRS 1	VER	2.0 km	MPC · JPL
789893	2017 WS_{46}	—	November 21, 2017	Haleakala	Pan-STARRS 1	·	2.5 km	MPC · JPL
789894	2017 WR_{47}	—	November 27, 2017	Mount Lemmon	Mount Lemmon Survey	EOS	1.4 km	MPC · JPL
789895	2017 WK_{48}	—	November 17, 2017	Mount Lemmon	Mount Lemmon Survey	EOS	1.4 km	MPC · JPL
789896	2017 WS_{49}	—	November 21, 2017	Haleakala	Pan-STARRS 1	·	2.6 km	MPC · JPL
789897	2017 WC_{51}	—	February 13, 2008	Mount Lemmon	Mount Lemmon Survey	·	2.1 km	MPC · JPL
789898	2017 WQ_{52}	—	November 18, 2017	Haleakala	Pan-STARRS 1	·	1.9 km	MPC · JPL
789899	2017 WG_{55}	—	May 20, 2015	Cerro Tololo	DECam	KOR	990 m	MPC · JPL
789900	2017 WX_{62}	—	November 21, 2017	Haleakala	Pan-STARRS 1	·	1.3 km	MPC · JPL

== 789901–790000 ==
back to top

Designation			Discovery			Properties		Ref
Permanent	Provisional	Named after	Date	Site	Discoverer(s)	Category	Diam.	Ref
789901	2017 WR_{63}	—	November 19, 2017	Haleakala	Pan-STARRS 1	·	1.7 km	MPC · JPL
789902	2017 WW_{63}	—	June 2, 2014	Haleakala	Pan-STARRS 1	LIX	2.7 km	MPC · JPL
789903	2017 WP_{64}	—	November 18, 2017	Haleakala	Pan-STARRS 1	NAE	1.5 km	MPC · JPL
789904	2017 WF_{65}	—	September 25, 2016	Mount Lemmon	Mount Lemmon Survey	EOS	1.3 km	MPC · JPL
789905	2017 WG_{66}	—	May 21, 2015	Haleakala	Pan-STARRS 1	KOR	990 m	MPC · JPL
789906	2017 WF_{68}	—	November 21, 2017	Mount Lemmon	Mount Lemmon Survey	·	2.0 km	MPC · JPL
789907	2017 WN_{77}	—	November 17, 2017	Haleakala	Pan-STARRS 1	EOS	1.1 km	MPC · JPL
789908	2017 WM_{80}	—	April 28, 2014	Cerro Tololo	DECam	·	2.2 km	MPC · JPL
789909	2017 WX_{85}	—	November 21, 2017	Haleakala	Pan-STARRS 1	·	1.3 km	MPC · JPL
789910	2017 WR_{88}	—	October 15, 2017	Mount Lemmon	Mount Lemmon Survey	·	2.4 km	MPC · JPL
789911	2017 WQ_{90}	—	November 21, 2017	Haleakala	Pan-STARRS 1	·	2.3 km	MPC · JPL
789912	2017 WE_{96}	—	November 17, 2017	Haleakala	Pan-STARRS 1	EOS	1.2 km	MPC · JPL
789913	2017 WF_{96}	—	November 17, 2017	Haleakala	Pan-STARRS 1	·	1.3 km	MPC · JPL
789914	2017 WB_{98}	—	October 15, 2017	Mount Lemmon	Mount Lemmon Survey	·	2.4 km	MPC · JPL
789915	2017 WD_{102}	—	November 18, 2017	Haleakala	Pan-STARRS 1	EOS	1.2 km	MPC · JPL
789916	2017 WE_{102}	—	February 24, 2014	Haleakala	Pan-STARRS 1	·	1.4 km	MPC · JPL
789917	2017 XW	—	January 18, 2015	Haleakala	Pan-STARRS 1	·	770 m	MPC · JPL
789918	2017 XT_{6}	—	August 3, 2016	Haleakala	Pan-STARRS 1	·	2.3 km	MPC · JPL
789919	2017 XN_{8}	—	September 4, 2011	Haleakala	Pan-STARRS 1	·	1.9 km	MPC · JPL
789920	2017 XQ_{12}	—	April 18, 2015	Cerro Tololo	DECam	·	1.5 km	MPC · JPL
789921	2017 XV_{13}	—	October 28, 2017	Haleakala	Pan-STARRS 1	·	1.2 km	MPC · JPL
789922	2017 XD_{14}	—	August 7, 2016	Haleakala	Pan-STARRS 1	·	1.3 km	MPC · JPL
789923	2017 XQ_{17}	—	December 2, 2005	Kitt Peak	Spacewatch	·	600 m	MPC · JPL
789924	2017 XE_{20}	—	September 15, 2012	Kitt Peak	Spacewatch	·	1.3 km	MPC · JPL
789925	2017 XG_{31}	—	November 19, 2006	Kitt Peak	Spacewatch	·	1.8 km	MPC · JPL
789926	2017 XK_{33}	—	October 30, 2017	Haleakala	Pan-STARRS 1	·	1.1 km	MPC · JPL
789927	2017 XM_{35}	—	November 27, 2017	Mount Lemmon	Mount Lemmon Survey	·	2.0 km	MPC · JPL
789928	2017 XT_{39}	—	May 20, 2015	Cerro Tololo	DECam	·	1.7 km	MPC · JPL
789929	2017 XC_{43}	—	May 3, 2014	Mount Lemmon	Mount Lemmon Survey	·	2.3 km	MPC · JPL
789930	2017 XP_{45}	—	September 24, 2011	Haleakala	Pan-STARRS 1	·	2.2 km	MPC · JPL
789931	2017 XE_{46}	—	September 29, 2011	Mount Lemmon	Mount Lemmon Survey	·	2.1 km	MPC · JPL
789932	2017 XR_{46}	—	March 26, 2014	Mount Lemmon	Mount Lemmon Survey	·	2.0 km	MPC · JPL
789933	2017 XE_{50}	—	November 21, 2017	Haleakala	Pan-STARRS 1	·	1.2 km	MPC · JPL
789934	2017 XA_{51}	—	November 14, 2017	Mount Lemmon	Mount Lemmon Survey	·	2.0 km	MPC · JPL
789935	2017 XK_{51}	—	December 30, 2011	Mount Lemmon	Mount Lemmon Survey	·	2.1 km	MPC · JPL
789936	2017 XF_{56}	—	September 25, 2011	Haleakala	Pan-STARRS 1	·	2.0 km	MPC · JPL
789937	2017 XJ_{57}	—	June 8, 2016	Haleakala	Pan-STARRS 1	EOS	1.4 km	MPC · JPL
789938	2017 XM_{71}	—	December 8, 2017	Haleakala	Pan-STARRS 1	·	2.2 km	MPC · JPL
789939	2017 XF_{72}	—	December 13, 2017	Mount Lemmon	Mount Lemmon Survey	EUN	890 m	MPC · JPL
789940	2017 XL_{76}	—	December 8, 2017	Haleakala	Pan-STARRS 1	·	2.3 km	MPC · JPL
789941	2017 XL_{83}	—	December 12, 2017	Haleakala	Pan-STARRS 1	·	2.6 km	MPC · JPL
789942	2017 XO_{86}	—	December 13, 2017	Mount Lemmon	Mount Lemmon Survey	·	920 m	MPC · JPL
789943	2017 XV_{86}	—	December 14, 2017	Mount Lemmon	Mount Lemmon Survey	·	1.3 km	MPC · JPL
789944	2017 XY_{92}	—	December 8, 2017	Haleakala	Pan-STARRS 1	·	2.5 km	MPC · JPL
789945	2017 XJ_{95}	—	December 8, 2017	Haleakala	Pan-STARRS 1	EOS	1.3 km	MPC · JPL
789946	2017 XM_{96}	—	December 13, 2017	Mount Lemmon	Mount Lemmon Survey	3:2 · SHU	3.6 km	MPC · JPL
789947	2017 YU_{10}	—	August 26, 2016	Haleakala	Pan-STARRS 1	·	1.8 km	MPC · JPL
789948	2017 YD_{23}	—	December 23, 2017	Haleakala	Pan-STARRS 1	THM	1.9 km	MPC · JPL
789949	2017 YJ_{25}	—	December 23, 2017	Haleakala	Pan-STARRS 1	·	1.1 km	MPC · JPL
789950	2017 YS_{26}	—	December 24, 2017	Haleakala	Pan-STARRS 1	·	930 m	MPC · JPL
789951	2017 YH_{27}	—	December 20, 2017	Mount Lemmon	Mount Lemmon Survey	·	930 m	MPC · JPL
789952	2017 YL_{28}	—	December 23, 2017	Haleakala	Pan-STARRS 1	·	2.5 km	MPC · JPL
789953	2017 YX_{28}	—	December 27, 2017	Mount Lemmon	Mount Lemmon Survey	·	1.3 km	MPC · JPL
789954	2017 YG_{29}	—	December 23, 2017	Haleakala	Pan-STARRS 1	HOF	2.0 km	MPC · JPL
789955	2017 YZ_{35}	—	December 23, 2017	Haleakala	Pan-STARRS 1	THM	2.0 km	MPC · JPL
789956	2017 YX_{40}	—	December 25, 2017	Haleakala	Pan-STARRS 1	·	1.8 km	MPC · JPL
789957	2017 YT_{41}	—	December 25, 2017	Haleakala	Pan-STARRS 1	(1298)	2.3 km	MPC · JPL
789958	2017 YV_{42}	—	December 29, 2017	Haleakala	Pan-STARRS 1	·	1.0 km	MPC · JPL
789959	2017 YW_{45}	—	December 25, 2017	Haleakala	Pan-STARRS 1	EOS	1.5 km	MPC · JPL
789960	2017 YD_{46}	—	December 25, 2017	Haleakala	Pan-STARRS 1	·	1.9 km	MPC · JPL
789961	2017 YB_{52}	—	August 29, 2016	Mount Lemmon	Mount Lemmon Survey	·	1.2 km	MPC · JPL
789962	2017 YM_{58}	—	May 23, 2014	Haleakala	Pan-STARRS 1	LIX	2.8 km	MPC · JPL
789963	2017 YY_{58}	—	December 16, 2017	Mount Lemmon	Mount Lemmon Survey	EOS	1.3 km	MPC · JPL
789964	2017 YN_{59}	—	December 23, 2017	Haleakala	Pan-STARRS 1	·	1.1 km	MPC · JPL
789965	2017 YC_{61}	—	October 2, 2016	Haleakala	Pan-STARRS 1	·	2.7 km	MPC · JPL
789966	2017 YN_{65}	—	December 29, 2017	Haleakala	Pan-STARRS 1	·	2.1 km	MPC · JPL
789967	2017 YD_{70}	—	December 16, 2017	Mount Lemmon	Mount Lemmon Survey	·	1.4 km	MPC · JPL
789968	2017 YJ_{71}	—	December 24, 2017	Haleakala	Pan-STARRS 1	·	2.0 km	MPC · JPL
789969	2018 AW_{5}	—	April 30, 2014	Haleakala	Pan-STARRS 1	VER	2.2 km	MPC · JPL
789970	2018 AV_{15}	—	September 23, 2017	Haleakala	Pan-STARRS 1	·	2.4 km	MPC · JPL
789971	2018 AM_{27}	—	January 15, 2018	Haleakala	Pan-STARRS 1	·	750 m	MPC · JPL
789972	2018 AV_{31}	—	January 12, 2018	Mount Lemmon	Mount Lemmon Survey	·	860 m	MPC · JPL
789973	2018 AO_{32}	—	January 12, 2018	Haleakala	Pan-STARRS 1	·	1.3 km	MPC · JPL
789974	2018 AT_{35}	—	January 15, 2018	Haleakala	Pan-STARRS 1	·	1.1 km	MPC · JPL
789975	2018 AK_{43}	—	January 15, 2018	Haleakala	Pan-STARRS 1	·	2.8 km	MPC · JPL
789976	2018 AL_{43}	—	September 24, 2008	Mount Lemmon	Mount Lemmon Survey	·	760 m	MPC · JPL
789977	2018 AD_{46}	—	January 15, 2018	Haleakala	Pan-STARRS 1	L5	6.9 km	MPC · JPL
789978	2018 AF_{46}	—	January 15, 2018	Haleakala	Pan-STARRS 1	L5	5.9 km	MPC · JPL
789979	2018 AG_{46}	—	January 15, 2018	Haleakala	Pan-STARRS 1	L5	6.8 km	MPC · JPL
789980	2018 AS_{46}	—	January 15, 2018	Haleakala	Pan-STARRS 1	·	2.6 km	MPC · JPL
789981	2018 AX_{46}	—	April 29, 2014	Cerro Tololo	DECam	·	1.7 km	MPC · JPL
789982	2018 AU_{47}	—	June 27, 2015	Haleakala	Pan-STARRS 1	·	2.4 km	MPC · JPL
789983	2018 AK_{48}	—	November 5, 2016	Haleakala	Pan-STARRS 1	·	2.0 km	MPC · JPL
789984	2018 AS_{51}	—	February 13, 2004	Kitt Peak	Spacewatch	·	1.4 km	MPC · JPL
789985	2018 AH_{52}	—	January 14, 2018	Haleakala	Pan-STARRS 1	·	1.8 km	MPC · JPL
789986	2018 AQ_{54}	—	January 15, 2018	Haleakala	Pan-STARRS 1	NEM	1.7 km	MPC · JPL
789987	2018 AD_{55}	—	January 14, 2018	Haleakala	Pan-STARRS 1	·	1.5 km	MPC · JPL
789988	2018 AP_{63}	—	September 30, 2016	Haleakala	Pan-STARRS 1	·	1.2 km	MPC · JPL
789989	2018 BW_{11}	—	January 21, 2018	Calar Alto-CASADO	Mottola, S., Hellmich, S.	L5	6.2 km	MPC · JPL
789990	2018 BM_{18}	—	January 16, 2018	Haleakala	Pan-STARRS 1	·	1.7 km	MPC · JPL
789991	2018 BP_{19}	—	May 20, 2015	Cerro Tololo	DECam	·	940 m	MPC · JPL
789992	2018 BZ_{19}	—	May 21, 2015	Cerro Tololo	DECam	·	780 m	MPC · JPL
789993	2018 BH_{20}	—	January 20, 2018	Haleakala	Pan-STARRS 1	·	1.3 km	MPC · JPL
789994	2018 BR_{22}	—	January 16, 2018	Haleakala	Pan-STARRS 1	·	950 m	MPC · JPL
789995	2018 BA_{24}	—	January 20, 2018	Haleakala	Pan-STARRS 1	·	1.1 km	MPC · JPL
789996	2018 BB_{24}	—	January 23, 2018	Mount Lemmon	Mount Lemmon Survey	EUN	910 m	MPC · JPL
789997	2018 BG_{27}	—	January 20, 2018	Haleakala	Pan-STARRS 1	·	1.4 km	MPC · JPL
789998	2018 BD_{29}	—	January 20, 2018	Haleakala	Pan-STARRS 1	SYL	2.9 km	MPC · JPL
789999	2018 BV_{29}	—	January 27, 2018	Mount Lemmon	Mount Lemmon Survey	·	2.1 km	MPC · JPL
790000	2018 BK_{32}	—	January 16, 2018	Haleakala	Pan-STARRS 1	·	1.8 km	MPC · JPL

back to top
